= Dallas season 1 =

Dallas
- Season 1
- DVD cover
- No. of episodes: 5

Release
- Original network: CBS
- Original release: April 2 – April 30, 1978

Season chronology
- Next → Season 2

The television show Dallas originally aired as a five-episode miniseries starting on the first Sunday of April 1978. These five episodes were originally intended to be the show's pilot but by the time they aired, it was thought that no further episodes would be made. However, the popularity of the miniseries led to the creation of an additional 13 full seasons.

== Production ==
The original miniseries was shot over six weeks during the winter of 1977, on location in Dallas, Texas. The Cloyce Box Ranch served as the first 'South Fork Ranch' exterior, and a Swiss Avenue building was used for the interior stage sets.

== Cast ==
=== Starring ===
In alphabetical order:

- Barbara Bel Geddes as Miss Ellie Ewing (5 episodes)
- Jim Davis as Jock Ewing (5 episodes)
- Patrick Duffy as Bobby Ewing (5 episodes)
- Larry Hagman as J. R. Ewing (5 episodes)
- Victoria Principal as Pamela Barnes Ewing (5 episodes)
- Charlene Tilton as Lucy Ewing (5 episodes)

=== Also starring ===
- Linda Gray as Sue Ellen Ewing (5 episodes)
- Steve Kanaly as Ray Krebbs (4 episodes)
- Ken Kercheval as Cliff Barnes (3 episodes)

=== Special guest star ===
- David Wayne as Willard "Digger" Barnes (2 episodes)

=== Notable guest stars ===
The most notable among the first season's recurring guest stars were Tina Louise as J.R.'s secretary/mistress Julie Grey, Donna Bullock as the first of four actresses to portray Bobby's original secretary, Connie Brasher; and Jo McDonnell as Ray's girlfriend Maureen.

Major non-recurring guest stars included: Jeffrey Byron as Lucy's schoolmate, Roger Hurley, and Paul Tulley as their teacher Mr. Miller (episode 2); Norman Alden as Ewing family friend and US Senator William "Wild Bill" Orloff (episode 3); Brian Dennehy and Cooper Huckabee as Luther Frick and Peyton Allen, who held the Ewing women hostage in an attempt to get revenge on J.R. and Ray (episode 4); and James Canning as Cliff's and Pam's cousin Jimmy Monahan, who was recast with Philip Levien for the season 2 premiere, and then never seen again (episode 5).

== Crew ==
Series creator David Jacobs wrote the first and final episodes of the season and served as the executive script consultant (i.e. showrunner). He remained as the creative consultant until mid-way through the second season, when he left his day-to-day involvement with Dallas to create, and later serve as showrunner on spinoff series Knots Landing. The three other episodes were written by Virginia Aldridge, which was her only involvement with the show; Arthur Bernard Lewis, who remained on the show until the end and wrote the teleplay for the two reunion movies; and Camille Marchetta, who left during season four.

Lee Rich and Philip Capice served as executive producers. Rich stayed on the show until the season three finale, and Capice left his duties at the end of the ninth season. Future showrunner Leonard Katzman's involvement with the first season was limited to being the producer, and Cliff Fenneman—who served as producer for the final three seasons of the show—was the associate producer. The directing duties of the season were shared by Robert Day and Irving J. Moore.

== DVD release ==
The first and second seasons were released by Warner Home Video on a Region 1 DVD box set on August 24, 2004. It includes five double-sided DVDs. Alongside the 29 episodes of the first two seasons, it also features a SOAPNet’s Soap Talk Dallas reunion featurette, and three commentary tracks by actors Larry Hagman, Charlene Tilton, and series creator David Jacobs.

== Episodes ==
No. overall	No. in season	Title	Directed by	Written by	Original U.S. air date	Original U.K. air date	Rating/share (households)
1	1	"Digger's Daughter"	Robert Day	David Jacobs	April 2, 1978	September 5, 1978	21.5/37
Bobby Ewing (Patrick Duffy) and Pamela Barnes Ewing (Victoria Principal) reveal to their families that they are married. This renews the longtime rivalry between the Ewings and the Barneses. J.R. (Larry Hagman) attempts to break up Bobby and Pam by recruiting her former flame: the Ewings' ranch foreman, Ray Krebbs (Steve Kanaly).
2	2	"The Lesson"	Irving J. Moore	Virginia Aldrige	April 9, 1978	September 12, 1978	15.2/26
Pam attempts to win acceptance at Southfork by intervening in Lucy's life when she discovers Lucy has been skipping school and having an affair with Ray Krebbs.
3	3	"Spy in the House"	Robert Day	Arthur Bernard Lewis	April 16, 1978	September 19, 1978	15.8/26
J.R. has suspected that Pam's marriage to Bobby was a Barnes attempt to plant a mole inside the Ewing lair. Now he may have proof.
4	4	"Winds of Vengeance"	Irving J. Moore	Camille Marchetta	April 23, 1978	Not Broadcast on the BBC	21.2/37
A hurricane threatens Southfork, but an even bigger storm is about to hit when Miss Ellie, Pam, Sue Ellen and Lucy become captives of men who are more than a little annoyed with J.R. and Ray's affairs with the women in their lives. Special Guest Star: Brian Dennehy as Luther Frick
5	5	"Barbecue"	Robert Day	David Jacobs	April 30, 1978	September 26, 1978	21.8/36
Hostility is the main course at the Ewing barbecue as Jock and Digger jab at old wounds, but Pam and Bobby use Pam's pregnancy as a truce between the prospective grandfathers. Tensions run high as J.R. and Bobby argue, which leads to an accident nobody expected. As a result, Pam's health and the future of the Ewing dynasty are in jeopardy.

== Nielsen ratings ==
Episode #	Episode title	Air date	Weekly rank (Rating/Share)
1	"Digger's Daughter"	April 2, 1978	#18 (21.5/37)
2	"Lessons"	April 9, 1978	#50 (15.2/26.0)
3	"Spy in the House"	April 16, 1978	#40 (N/A)
4	"Winds of Vengeance"	April 23, 1978	#12 (21.1/35)
5	"Barbecue"	April 30, 1978	#11 (21.8/39)
