= Dallas season 2 =

Dallas
- Season 2
- No. of episodes: 24

Release
- Original network: CBS
- Original release: September 23, 1978 – April 6, 1979

Season chronology
- ← Previous; Season 1 Next → Season 3

The second season of the television series Dallas aired on CBS during the 1978–79 TV season.

== Cast ==
=== Starring ===
In alphabetical order:

- Barbara Bel Geddes as Miss Ellie Ewing (24 episodes)
- Jim Davis as Jock Ewing (24 episodes)
- Patrick Duffy as Bobby Ewing (24 episodes)
- Linda Gray as Sue Ellen Ewing (24 episodes)
- Larry Hagman as J. R. Ewing (24 episodes)
- Steve Kanaly as Ray Krebbs (14 episodes)
- Victoria Principal as Pamela Barnes Ewing (24 episodes)
- Charlene Tilton as Lucy Ewing (24 episodes)

=== Also starring ===
- Ken Kercheval as Cliff Barnes (14 episodes)
- Tina Louise as Julie Grey (2 episodes), billed under "Guest Star" status in her first appearance

=== Special guest stars ===
- David Wayne as Willard "Digger" Barnes (3 episodes)
- John McIntire as Sam Culver (1 episode)

=== Notable guest stars ===
Several long running Dallas cast members debut during the second season. Most notably Susan Howard, who became a series regular in Season 5, made her first appearance as Donna Culver. Additionally, Don Starr (Jordan Lee), Fern Fitzgerald (Marielee Stone), Paul Sorensen (Andy Bradley), Robert Ackerman (Wade Luce), Sherril Lynn Rettino (Jackie Dugan), Barbara Babcock (Liz Craig), James Brown (Harry McSween), Karlene Crockett (Muriel Gillis), John Zaremba (Dr. Harlen Danvers), and Meg Gallagher (Louella Caraway Lee) all appeared for the first time. Also, after being played by Donna Bullock in Season 1, and briefly by Ann Ford and Nancy Bleier in Season 2, Jeanna Michaels finally joined the cast as Connie Brasher, Bobby's secretary, during Season 2, thus becoming the final and longest lasting actress in the role, playing her until Season 4.

David Ackroyd and Joan Van Ark appeared as Lucy's parents Gary and Valene Ewing. In 1979, both characters returned in their own series, Dallas spinoff Knots Landing, with Ted Shackelford replacing Ackroyd, and continued to appear in Dallas until the mid 1980s. Both characters returned for the series finale "Conundrum" in 1991. Colleen Camp appeared as Kristin Shepard, a character recast by Mary Crosby the following year, receiving an "also starring" billing. Morgan Fairchild appeared as the first of three actresses to play Jenna Wade, with Jenna later portrayed by Francine Tacker in Season 3, and by series regular Priscilla Presley from Seasons 7–11. Laurie Lynn Myers appeared as Jenna's daughter Charlie, later portrayed by Shalane McCall from Seasons 7–11. Martha Scott appeared in one episode as Patricia Shepard, but returned for recurring episodes during seasons 3 and 9.

== Crew ==
Series creator David Jacobs writes the first two episodes of the season, introducing the characters of Gary and Valene, and continues as creative consultant until halfway through the season, when he left Dallas to create Knots Landing. Producer Leonard Katzman writes and directs his first episodes, and replaces Jacobs as showrunner, remaining on the show until its closure in 1991.

Additional writers include the returning Camille Marchetta and Arthur Bernard Lewis, as well as newcomers Darlene Craviotto, Jim Inman, Worley Thorne, Rena Down, D. C. Fontana and Richard Fontana. Lee Rich and Philip Capice continue to serve as executive producers. Katzman serves as producer, and Cliff Fenneman as associate producer. Arthur Bernard Lewis was promoted executive story editor, with Camille Marchetta serving as story editor.

== DVD release ==
The second season was released, alongside season one, by Warner Home Video on a Region 1 DVD box set on August 24, 2004. The box includes five double-sided DVDs, and, alongside the two seasons' 29 episodes, it also include a SOAPnet’s Soap Talk Dallas reunion featurette, and three commentary tracks, by actors Larry Hagman and Charlene Tilton, and series creator David Jacobs.

== Episodes ==
No. overall	No. in season	Title	Directed by	Written by	Original U.S. air date	Original U.K. air date	Rating/share (households)
6	1	"Reunion – Part 1"	Irving J. Moore	David Jacobs	September 23, 1978	October 3, 1978	12.5/23
Bobby talks Gary into returning to Southfork after a long absence. Jimmy takes Lucy to the diner in Fort Worth where her mother Valene is working.
7	2	"Reunion – Part 2"	Irving J. Moore	David Jacobs	September 30, 1978	October 10, 1978	12.8/25
J.R pretends to help his younger brother by including him in some Ewing Oil business with a company that is expected to fail. Gary succumbs to the pressure and leaves Southfork. J.R. blackmails Valene into leaving by paying her off.
8	3	"Old Acquaintance"	Alex March	Camille Marchetta	October 7, 1978	October 17, 1978	12.9/22
Bobby's first love, Jenna Wade, re-enters his life needing his help after being exposed as the mistress of businessman Maynard Anderson. Bobby believes her daughter Charlie might be his, but Jenna will not confirm.
9	4	"Bypass"	Corey Allen	Arthur Bernard Lewis	October 14, 1978	October 24, 1978	14.3/26
Bobby doesn't like the way J.R. does business and questions his own role at Ewing Oil. Jock confronts J.R. leading to a heart attack. Bobby deals with his father's illness by joining Ray at Southfork. Jock knows J.R. is not telling him everything, and wants Bobby back at Ewing Oil. The operation goes fine, and Jock wonders about Bobby's role in the company. Bobby continues working at Southfork leaving Ewing Oil solely in J.R.'s hands.
10	5	"Black Market Baby"	Lawrence Dobkin	Darlene Craviotto	October 15, 1978	October 31, 1978	16.1/23
Sue Ellen is worried Pam will produce the next Ewing heir before her, so she decides to adopt. Sue Ellen finds a young woman named Rita who is willing to give up her baby and she unexpectedly forms a maternal relationship with her. J.R. finds out about the plan and has Rita transported out of state. He wants an heir as much as Sue Ellen, but tells her it has to be "our child, not somebody else's". Meanwhile, Bobby and Pam have their own problem when Pam is offered a job, but Bobby doesn't believe that she should work. They become at odds, but Bobby makes up by buying her a new car. NOTE: Due to low viewer ratings, with this episode, the series moves from Saturday night airings back to Sundays in the United States.
11	6	"Double Wedding"	Paul Stanley	Jim Inman and Arthur Bernard Lewis	October 21, 1978	November 7, 1978	15.1/30
Pam's ex-husband, Ed Haynes, shows up in Dallas causing conflict in Bobby and Pam's marriage. Ed was away in Vietnam when Pam got the divorce and claims he never got the papers. This would mean that he and Pam are still married. Bobby unravels the scheme by tracking down Haynes' partner and locating a copy of the annulment papers.
12	7	"Runaway"	Barry Crane	Worley Thorne	October 29, 1978	November 14, 1978	17.4/30
Lucy wants to invite her mother to her birthday party. Jock does not want Valene on the ranch so Lucy tries to explain that J.R. lied and her mother never took the bribe, but Jock stands firm. Lucy leaves and is picked up by a con man, Willie Guest, who initially includes Lucy in some of his schemes but Lucy does not cooperate and he kidnaps her. Bobby and the police track them down and Lucy returns safely.
13	8	"Election"	Barry Crane	Rena Down	November 5, 1978	November 21, 1978	15.5/26
Pam works on Cliff's campaign to run for state senator while Jock orders Bobby to work on Cliff's opponent's campaign. J.R. tricks Pam into revealing damaging information from Cliff's past that leads to a political scandal and defeat for Cliff. A furious Pam confronts Jock and J.R. and vows to make them pay for hurting her brother.
14	9	"Survival"	Irving J. Moore	D. C. Fontana, Richard Fontana	November 12, 1978	November 28, 1978	21.0/38
During a storm, J.R. and Bobby's plane crashes. The news gets to Ellie first, and worried about Jock's heart condition, she insists the news be kept from him. As J.R. and Bobby fight for survival, the Ewing women contemplate life without them in it. Miss Ellie confronts a reporter who comes to Southfork, Jock overhears the conversation and is furious that the news has been kept from him.
15	10	"Act of Love"	Corey Allen	Leonard Katzman	November 19, 1978	December 12, 1978	16.2/25
J.R. goes to Washington, D.C. for lobbying and extra curricular activities. Jock, recuperating, takes on temporary leadership duties at Ewing Oil. Sue Ellen spends more time with Cliff Barnes, then receives an important call from her doctor telling her she is pregnant. Offered a promotion at the store, Pam debates between a Paris shopping trip and Bobby's party.
16	11	"Triangle"	Vincent McEveety	Camille Marchetta	November 26, 1978	December 19, 1978	17.7/28
Ray has become serious about country singer Garnet McGee. When Jock leaves Ray some land at Southfork, he pops the question to Garnet. Garnet wants more than Ray can offer and hooks up with J.R., who negotiates a music contract for her. Coming back from Sacramento on J.Rs information about a cow for sale that is untrue Lucy tells him that J.R is after Garnet, Ray is furious and heads for Garnet’s. He finds J.R. with her and a fight begin he tells Bobby he is leaving Southfork.
17	12	"Fallen Idol"	Vincent McEveety	Arthur Bernard Lewis	December 3, 1978	December 5, 1978	21.9/35
Bobby's old friend Guzzler Bennett returns to Dallas wanting Bobby to join him in a construction venture. The plan is to build a shopping mall on Southfork. Ellie wants no part of a shopping mall and J.R. has other plans for the land. NOTE: This episode aired in the UK before the episodes "Act of Love" and "Triangle".
18	13	"Kidnapped"	Lawrence Dobkin	Camille Marchetta	December 17, 1978	January 9, 1979	22.1/38
Kidnappers going after J.R. end up taking Bobby instead. The kidnappers want to use Cliff Barnes as the go-between, but J.R. cannot stay out of it. J.R. overhears Cliff setting up a time to do the switch and he and Ray try to save Bobby.
19	14	"Home Again"	Don McDougall	Arthur Bernard Lewis	January 7, 1979	January 16, 1979	25.7/39
Ellie's brother Garrison, presumed dead, shows up at Southfork. Ellie, knowing the ranch was supposed to be his, tells the family she will be giving Southfork to Garrison. The family is not happy.
20	15	"For Love or Money"	Irving J. Moore	Leonard Katzman	January 14, 1979	January 23, 1979	19.6/30
Sue Ellen's mother and sister arrive in Dallas. Sue Ellen catches J.R. with another woman, so she moves in with her family. J.R. is not happy, but finally decides he wants his wife home, even if the baby she is carrying is not his.
21	16	"Julie's Return"	Leslie H. Martinson	Rena Down	January 26, 1979	January 30, 1979	19.9/35
Julie Grey, Jock's former secretary, arrives back in Dallas, and Jock is thrilled to spend time with her and they renew their relationship. Fearing Jock is having an affair with Julie, J.R. tells his mother. Ellie tries to stop what is going on, but Jock leaves to see Julie. Once Jock leaves, J.R. shows up at Julie's door. Julie promises to keep causing trouble for J.R., but he tells her not to count on it. NOTE: With this episode, the series moves from Sunday night airings to Fridays in the United States. Dallas will remain a Friday night fixture on the CBS Television Network for the remainder of its original run.
22	17	"The Red File – Part 1"	Leonard Katzman	Arthur Bernard Lewis	February 2, 1979	February 13, 1979	18.6/32
J.R. is not happy that Cliff is back in public office. He attempts to use Julie to get information about Cliff. She is tired of J.R. and decides she will help Cliff instead, offering him all the Ewing secrets. Cliff heads to Julie's, but does not find her. After a run in with Ames and Garr from the cartel, Julie ends up dead, having fallen from the roof of her building. J.R. uses his influence to have Cliff booked for her murder. Pam walks out of Southfork into a Hotel.
23	18	"The Red File – Part 2"	Leonard Katzman	Arthur Bernard Lewis	February 9, 1979	February 20, 1979	21.7/38
After the shock death of Julie Grey, Pam is sure that J.R. is framing Cliff so she leaves Bobby and Southfork. Bobby is determined to save his marriage and starts investigating to help Cliff.
24	19	"Sue Ellen's Sister"	Irving J. Moore	Camille Marchetta	February 16, 1979	February 27, 1979	21.1/36
Cliff gets Ewing Oil information out of Sue Ellen then uses Pam in the Barnes-Ewing feud. Meanwhile, Sue Ellen's sister Kristin visits Southfork and with Pam away she makes a play for Bobby. Lucy and J.R. both see through Kristin, Lucy discourages Kristin but J.R. encourages her.
25	20	"Call Girl"	Leslie H. Martinson	Rena Down	February 23, 1979	March 13, 1979	17.1/29
While still separated from Bobby, Pam makes friends with a model, Leanne Rees. Leanne happens to be a former prostitute and an old acquaintance of J.R., who creates a photo opportunity in which Pam looks like she too is into the world's oldest profession. Bobby finds out about J.R.'s scheme and brings Pam back to Southfork.
26	21	"Royal Marriage"	Gunnar Hellström	Camille Marchetta	March 9, 1979	March 20, 1979	21.2/37
When Lucy gets engaged to Kit Mainwaring J.R. is thrilled, the potential business merger with Mainwaring Oil could be beneficial for Ewing Oil. Unfortunately, Kit Mainwaring is gay. He eventually confesses this to Bobby and then to Lucy. Lucy is heartbroken, but stands by Kit and keeps the secret. Only she and Bobby know the truth. But, of course, J.R. knew all along.
27	22	"The Outsiders"	Dennis Donnelly	Leonard Katzman	March 16, 1979	March 27, 1979	19.2/35
Ray meets Donna Culver in a bar and begins an affair unaware that she is married to Jock's old friend Sam Culver, a powerful former politician, who Jock and J.R. enlist in their struggle against Cliff Barnes' vendetta against Ewing Oil. After her break up from Kit, Lucy turns to drugs.
28	23	"John Ewing III – Part 1"	Leonard Katzman	Camille Marchetta	March 23, 1979	April 10, 1979	23.5/43
Sue Ellen's battle with the bottle continues, despite her pregnancy. When Lucy and Sue Ellen are alone at Southfork, they have a meeting in which Sue Ellen ends up falling down the stairs. Lucy seems to have learned her lesson, but J.R. decides to put Sue Ellen, against her wishes, in a sanitarium.
29	24	"John Ewing III – Part 2"	Leonard Katzman	Arthur Bernard Lewis	April 6, 1979	April 17, 1979	23.9/42
Sue Ellen is not happy in the sanitarium. Bobby visits her and thinks that Cliff is the father of the baby punches him. She bribes a nurse for alcohol and leaves the sanitarium, and is involved in a car accident. She ends up in the hospital with the baby's life in danger. Cliff, thinking he is the father, rushes to the hospital.
