= Dallas season 3 =

Dallas
- Season 3
- DVD cover
- No. of episodes: 25

Release
- Original network: CBS
- Original release: September 21, 1979 – March 21, 1980

Season chronology
- ← Previous; Season 2 Next → Season 4

The third season of the television series Dallas aired on CBS during the 1979–80 TV season.

== Cast ==
=== Starring ===
In alphabetical order:

- Barbara Bel Geddes as Miss Ellie Ewing (25 episodes)
- Jim Davis as Jock Ewing (25 episodes)
- Patrick Duffy as Bobby Ewing (25 episodes)
- Linda Gray as Sue Ellen Ewing (25 episodes)
- Larry Hagman as J. R. Ewing (25 episodes)
- Steve Kanaly as Ray Krebbs (16 episodes)
- Ken Kercheval as Cliff Barnes (21 episodes)
- Victoria Principal as Pamela Barnes Ewing (25 episodes)
- Charlene Tilton as Lucy Ewing (24 episodes)

=== Also starring ===
- Mary Crosby as Kristin Shepard (20 episodes)
- Randolph Powell as Alan Beam (16 episodes)
- Keenan Wynn as Willard "Digger" Barnes (10 episodes)

=== Special guest stars ===
- Don Porter as Matt Devlin (4 episodes)
- Mel Ferrer as Harrison Page (2 episodes)
- E. J. André as Eugene Bullock (1 episode)

=== Notable guest stars ===
Future series regular Susan Howard returns as Donna Culver for four episodes. The character Jenna Wade, who will be portrayed by series regular Priscilla Presley in later seasons, also returns for two episodes, now played by Francine Tacker. Longrunning supporting actors Jared Martin (Steven "Dusty" Farlow). George O. Petrie (Harv Smithfield), Stephanie Blackmore (Serena Wald), Tom Fuccello (Dave Culver), Jeff Cooper (Dr. Simon Ellby), Dennis Patrick (Vaughn Leland) and Barry Corbin (Sheriff Fenton Washburn) make their debuts. Mel Ferrer (Harrison Page) appears in two episodes as Pam's immediate supervisor at The Store after her promotion to Buyer. Stephen Elliott (Scotty Demarest) and Martha Scott (Patricia Shepard), who appear in one and two episodes, respectively, will return as "special guest stars" for seasons 8 and 10 (Elliot), and 9 (Scott). Ironically, Elliot and Ferrer would play the first two husbands of Jane Wyman's character Angela Channing in the early seasons of one of Lorimar's other 80s hit soap dramas, Falcon Crest. Characters Gary (now played by Ted Shackelford) and Valene Ewing (Joan Van Ark) appear for one and two episodes, respectively, promoting Dallas spinoff Knots Landing, premiering in December 1979.

This season had four prominent supporting characters recast with new actors. Kristin Shepard, played by Colleen Camp in the previous season, is now played by Mary Crosby. Digger Barnes, previously played by David Wayne is now played by Keenan Wynn. Jenna Wade, previously played for one episode by Morgan Fairchild, is now played by Francine Tacker. Lastly, Gary Ewing, who was played for two episodes in the previous season by dark-haired David Ackroyd is now played by blond actor Ted Shackelford, who would then go on to play the character throughout the entire 14 season run of spin-off series Knots Landing.

== Crew ==
David Jacobs, creator of the series, returns to write his final Dallas episode, "Return Engagements", which leads into the pilot episode of Jacobs' brainchild Knots Landing. The season's episode writers include showrunner Leonard Katzman, the returning Camille Marchetta, Arthur Bernard Lewis, Worley Thorne, D. C. Fontana, Richard Fontana, and Rena Down, as well as new additions Loraine Despres, Jeff Young, Linda B. Elstad and Barbara Searles. Lee Rich and Philip Capice continue to serve as executive producers. Katzman serves as producer, and Cliff Fenneman as associate producer, while Arthur Bernard Lewis continues as executive story editor, and Camille Marchetta as story editor.

== DVD release ==
Season three of Dallas was released by Warner Bros. Home Video, on a Region 1 DVD box set of five double-sided DVDs, on August 9, 2005. In addition to the 25 episodes, it also includes commentaries by Patrick Duffy and Linda Gray, and the featurette "Who Shot J.R.?: The Dallas Phenomenon".

== Knots Landing ==
The Dallas spin-off series Knots Landing premiered in December 1979, and throughout the season, three Knots Landing episodes featured Dallas characters: Bobby (Patrick Duffy) appeared in Pilot (airing on December 27, 1979); J.R. (Larry Hagman) in Community Spirit (January 3, 1980); and Lucy (Charlene Tilton) in Home is for the Healing (January 31, 1980, her only Knots Landing appearance).

== Episodes ==
No. overall	No. in season	Title	Directed by	Written by	Original U.S. air date	Original U.K. air date	Prod. code	Rating/share (households)
30	1	"Whatever Happened to Baby John?: Part 1"	Leonard Katzman	Camille Marchetta	September 21, 1979	November 17, 1979	188136	21.1/35
The happiness felt by the Ewing family on Sue Ellen's return from the hospital changes to concern when it becomes obvious she has little enthusiasm for anything, including her new baby. Bobby and Pam discover Cliff Barnes is continuing with his efforts to claim Sue Ellen and the baby as his. J.R. is surprised when two of his former business associates are paroled from jail.Baby John goes missing from the hospital.
31	2	"Whatever Happened to Baby John?: Part 2"	Leonard Katzman	Camille Marchetta	September 28, 1979	November 24, 1979	188137	21.9/38
Though Bobby thinks Cliff may have taken John Ross, this ends up not being true. J.R thinks some of his thugs may have taken the child, but they are all wrong. Pamela ends up solving the kidnapping mystery by remembering a woman, Priscilla Duncan, whom she saw several times staring at babies at the hospital. It turns out Priscilla lost her baby, and her husband ran out on her, leaving her desperate and alone, so she stole John Ross. The baby is finally returned to its natural parents, but Sue Ellen is not overly emotional about the outcome.
32	3	"The Silent Killer"	Irving J. Moore	Arthur Bernard Lewis	October 5, 1979	December 1, 1979	188139	18.5/31
Cliff Barnes flies his father, Digger, to Dallas to show him how he's getting even with the Ewings. But Digger's sudden medical problem places a cloud over Cliff, Pam, and even Sue Ellen's new baby. A doctor's examination discloses that Digger has a genetic disorder that has not only been passed to his children, Pam and Cliff, but also to their offspring, which could prove fatal to John Ewing III if Cliff is actually the father, as he firmly believes. Sue Ellen's mother Patricia Shepard and Kristin Shepard, Sue Ellen's younger sister, come to town.
33	4	"Secrets"	Leonard Katzman	Arthur Bernard Lewis	October 12, 1979	December 8, 1979	188138	21.2/35
Lucy's mother Valene visits and tries to re-establish some understanding with her daughter. Pamela, already depressed with the reality of the Barnes family genetic disorder, suddenly has to cope with the news that she is pregnant. Valene implores Bobby to urge Lucy to meet with her. Pamela tries to decide whether to tell her husband the news, as well as her horrible secret, or decide on the fate of her unborn baby alone.
34	5	"The Kristin Affair"	Irving J. Moore	Worley Thorne	October 19, 1979	December 15, 1979	188142	23.8/43
Kristin gets a summer job at Ewing Oil as she openly vies for J.R.'s attention. Bobby learns about Pam's pregnancy before she can make a decision about getting an abortion. J.R. has his hands full as he tries to consummate the biggest oil deal of his life, as well as beginning his own kind of relationship with his sister-in-law.
35	6	"The Dove Hunt"	Leonard Katzman	D. C. Fontana & Richard Fontana	October 26, 1979	December 22, 1979	188143	26.3/47
On a hunting trip in Louisiana with J.R., Bobby and Ray, Jock finds himself the target of revenge from a man he doesn't even remember. Ellie is afraid that she might be facing surgery after finding a lump on her breast. Jock and J.R. are wounded by a sniper while hunting. With their vehicle sabotaged, Bobby and Ray have to walk to town for help and, thinking he might not recover, Jock reveals a secret to J.R. that he has been hiding from Ellie since before they were married.
36	7	"The Lost Child"	Irving J. Moore	Rena Down	November 2, 1979	December 29, 1979	188140	25.9/44
Bobby finds himself getting attached to Luke Middens, the young son of one of the hired hands, which only makes Pam's efforts to tell Bobby the truth about their unborn child even more difficult. Eventually, however, she is forced to confess. J.R. becomes suspicious of Sue Ellen's frequent trips to town, and when she refuses to acknowledge her activities, he hires a private detective to follow her. Pam suffers a miscarriage in a riding accident.
37	8	"Rodeo"	Leonard Katzman	Camille Marchetta	November 9, 1979	January 5, 1980	188145	22.3/39
At the annual Ewing-sponsored rodeo, Sue Ellen finds herself drawn to Dusty Farlow, a cowboy participant. Digger holds good his threat to see "his" grandson. J.R. feels threatened by Sue Ellen's sudden enthusiasm for life as she openly displays interest in Dusty. Lucy forces Ray to deal with a painful situation he tried to forget.
38	9	"Mastectomy"	Irving J. Moore	Arthur Bernard Lewis	November 16, 1979	January 12, 1980	188146	28.9/50
39	10	"Mastectomy"	Irving J. Moore	Arthur Bernard Lewis	November 16, 1979	January 12, 1980	188147	28.9/50
Ellie is afraid to tell Jock about the lump in her breast after he reveals he was married before and divorced his first wife when she became mentally ill. Her fear is Jock will leave her also if a mastectomy becomes necessary. Alan Beam continues J.R.'s plan to get Cliff out of the way. Sue Ellen keeps visiting a coffee shop with the hopes of meeting Dusty Farlow again. Ellie undergoes a lifesaving mastectomy. After undergoing the mastectomy, Ellie begins to face what life is going to be like for her. She and Jock seem to be drifting apart as her anger grows over the secret he kept from her for forty years. Digger proves himself a friend to Ellie and they have a long talk. Ellie realizes that she cannot go back in time but she must make peace with the present and the future. Lucy is cold to Ellie as she hides her fears that she will inherit breast cancer. Jock backs J.R. over Bobby in the plan to push Cliff aside. Sue Ellen meets Dusty at a hotel.
40	11	"The Heiress"	Leslie H. Martinson	Loraine Despres	November 23, 1979	January 19, 1980	188141	23.2/40
Lucy decides that Alan Beam is the man for her after she witnesses him standing up to J.R. although she doesn't know the fight was staged by Alan and J.R. to further convince Cliff of Beam's loyalty. Lucy makes an obvious play for Alan, who sees her as his ticket to riches. Pam accuses Bobby of trying to ruin her brother when she accidentally learns about J.R.'s secret Asian oil deal from Cliff.
41	12	"Ellie Saves the Day"	Gunnar Hellström	Arthur Bernard Lewis & David Michael Jacobs	November 30, 1979	January 26, 1980	188144	24.2/39
J.R. is caught from all sides when a typhoon delays the oil drilling in Asia as his bank loan becomes due. Bobby discovers that J.R. has mortgaged Southfork and he is forced to tell Jock and Ellie that they may lose everything. J.R. believes that once Cliff resigns his post as head of the Office of Land Management, the banks will extend their loan deadline. But he's crushed when the efforts of all the Ewing men seem to have failed. Ellie makes a supreme sacrifice in an effort to save Southfork.
42	13	"Mother of the Year"	Larry Hagman	Rena Down	December 14, 1979	February 2, 1980	188149	25.7/44
Sue Ellen's avoidance of John Ross becomes a source of conflict between her and J.R. and between Bobby and Pam as she starts to act like the baby belongs to her then Sue Ellen start bonding with Baby John. Seeing the pain Ellie is going through as workmen prepare to pump oil out of Southfork, Jock decides to sell the Asian oil leases even though it means losing millions. J.R., of course, tries to stop him.
43	14	"Return Engagements"	Gunnar Hellström	David Jacobs	December 20, 1979	February 9, 1980	188148	26.6/45
Ellie's sadness on the occasion of her missing son Gary's birthday quickly changes to jubilation when she learns he and Valene are both back in Dallas and plan to be remarry. Ellie plans to keep the news of the wedding a secret from J.R., who's on a business trip with Kristin, but Sue Ellen delights in giving him the news. She also tells Rudy Millington, Kristin's boyfriend, where to find her. This episode sets up Knots Landing.
44	15	"Love and Marriage"	Alexander Singer	Leonard Katzman	December 21, 1979	February 16, 1980	188150	26.5/45
J.R. decides that bringing Bobby back into Ewing Oil is the best way to keep Jock out of the office. J.R. also aims to get Pam a promotion to keep Bobby's mind off his troubled marriage. Pam is using work to hide from her own unhappiness. Ray seems to have found happiness at last when Donna Culver re-enters his life.
45	16	"Power Play"	Leslie H. Martinson	Jeff Young	January 4, 1980	February 23, 1980	188151	27.0/45
Alan Beam's "romance" with Lucy is discovered by Kristin who believes once J.R. knows about it he will quickly get rid of the ambitious young lawyer. J.R. fools everyone by encouraging Alan to follow through with his plans to marry Lucy. Lucy puts off deciding about Alan's proposal until J.R. orders her not to see him again, then she makes a startling announcement.
46	17	"Paternity Suit"	Harry Harris	Loraine Despres	January 11, 1980	March 1, 1980	188152	28.7/46
After Cliff announces he is quitting the race for Congress, Digger returns to the bottle and drunkenly tells a reporter that Cliff is really the father of Sue Ellen's baby. Jock insists the family sue Cliff, who counter sues for custody of his son. Sue Ellen, J.R. John Ross III and Cliff then take blood tests to prove once and for all who the baby's real father is. It proves to be J.R., who then embraces his son for the first time.
47	18	"Jenna's Return"	Irving J. Moore	Camille Marchetta	January 18, 1980	March 8, 1980	188153	27.2/45
Sue Ellen actively sees Dusty. Pam leaves town. An angry Bobby runs into Jenna Wade. Ray ponders if he and Donna have anything in common besides their love. J.R. gets angry and jealous of Sue Ellen's unexplained nights out. Kristin tries to take advantage of the situation to permanently enter J.R.'s life.
48	19	"Sue Ellen's Choice"	Leonard Katzman	Camille Marchetta	February 1, 1980	March 15, 1980	188154	28.6/44
Sue Ellen is being pressured by Dusty to leave J.R. Pam and Bobby's marriage continues to strain towards breaking point. Donna makes a last attempt to get Ray to change his mind about marriage. Sue Ellen makes her decision and asks J.R. for a divorce, but his reaction is not at all what she expects. Pam is surprised when Jenna visits and declares her intentions towards Bobby.
49	20	"Second Thoughts"	Irving J. Moore	Linda B. Elstad	February 8, 1980	March 22, 1980	188158	31.1/49
J.R. keeps pressuring Alan Beam to marry Lucy very soon. Cliff resigns from the OLM to run in the elections for Congress. But J.R.'s scheme to ruin him is a success and Cliff runs out of campaign money. For the moment, he is finished professionally and has nowhere to go. Bobby feels sorry for Cliff and decides to do some job hunting for him. This provokes a furious reaction from J.R.. Jock foils J.R.'s plans for Lucy and Alan by offering Alan a legal partnership in Dallas. Now J.R. tries to stop the marriage because there's no longer anything in it for him.
50	21	"Divorce, Ewing Style"	Leonard Katzman	Leonard Katzman	February 15, 1980	March 29, 1980	188155	25.4/40
Sue Ellen takes great pains to appear the perfect wife and mother in preparation for her divorce action. When J.R. realizes what she is planning, he decides to stage a strong counterattack. J.R. is furious when he learns Sue Ellen has a private detective following him on his nocturnal visits. He decides the best way to keep her from leaving with their son is to convince everyone that Sue Ellen is drinking again.
51	22	"Jock's Trial: Part I"	Irving J. Moore	Arthur Bernard Lewis	February 22, 1980	April 5, 1980	188156	23.0/36
As the new assistant district attorney, Cliff jumps at the chance to work on the investigation of a body found on Southfork. Sue Ellen fights to convince the family that she is not drinking again. Cliff's investigation unearths some new clues which tie the murder closer and closer to Jock. Sue Ellen prepares to leave J.R, and her baby she goes to Dusty's apartment and hears on the news of a plane crash and Dusty's death. Jock is arrested for murder.
52	23	"Jock's Trial: Part II"	Irving J. Moore	Arthur Bernard Lewis	February 29, 1980	April 5, 1980	188157	27.1/45
While Jock faces his murder trial, other family members are distracted with their own problems: Sue Ellen drinks to forget Dusty's death. Pam watches Digger slowly deteriorate in a hospital. J.R. fears his testimony will incriminate his father. The family hires famed criminal attorney, Scotty Demerest, only to be told that Cliff's case against Jock is dangerously incriminating. But as Digger slowly dies on his deathbed, he confesses that he was the real killer of the body found on Southfork and tells Pam that the man he killed was her biological father Hutch McKinney after he discovered Cliff and Pam's mother was having an affair.
53	24	"The Wheeler Dealer"	Alexander Singer	Barbara Searles	March 14, 1980	April 12, 1980	188159	25.7/45
With most of the family visiting Jock's first wife in a Colorado sanitarium, J.R. uses the time to try to set up an even bigger oil deal with the now profitable Asian wells. Sue Ellen and Pam deal with their separate grief in very different ways. Pam becomes determined to learn about her long-believed dead mother. Sue Ellen again seeks alcohol for her solace, which pleases J.R. since he plans to rid himself of his wife.
54	25	"A House Divided"	Irving J. Moore	Rena Down	March 21, 1980	May 26, 1980	188160	32.7/52
J.R.'s selling of the Asian oil leases before news of the fields' nationalization is made public, wipes out the fortunes of Ewing Oil's former business associates and also creates untold havoc within the family. J.R.'s business dealings also disgust Bobby so much that he and Pamela move out of Southfork. Sue Ellen decides to stop drinking and to wage her own battle against J.R.'s efforts to send her back to the sanitarium. Cliff also plans his own revenge against J.R.. Suspects are aplenty when J.R. while working late at the office, is shot. But who pulled the trigger...?
