= Dallas season 14 =

Dallas
- Season 14
- DVD cover
- No. of episodes: 23

Release
- Original network: CBS
- Original release: November 2, 1990 – May 3, 1991

Season chronology
- ← Previous; Season 13 Next → Dallas: J.R. Returns

The fourteenth and final season of the television series Dallas aired on CBS during the 1990–91 TV season.

== Cast ==
=== Starring ===
In alphabetical order:

- Patrick Duffy as Bobby Ewing (23 episodes)
- Kimberly Foster as Michelle Stevens Beaumont (16 episodes)
- Larry Hagman as J. R. Ewing (23 episodes)
- Howard Keel as Clayton Farlow (4 episodes)
- George Kennedy as Carter McKay (16 episodes)
- Ken Kercheval as Cliff Barnes (16 episodes)
- Sasha Mitchell as James Beaumont (17 episodes)
- Cathy Podewell as Cally Harper Ewing (10 episodes)
- Barbara Stock as Liz Adams (14 episodes)
- Sheree J. Wilson as April Stevens Ewing (7 episodes)

Additionally, the two-part series finale, "Conundrum", featured cast pics of following stars right after the opening sequence:

- Mary Crosby as Kristin Shepard
- Linda Gray as Sue Ellen Shepard
- Joel Grey as Adam
- Steve Kanaly as Ray Krebbs
- Jack Scalia as Nicholas Pearce
- Ted Shackelford as Gary Ewing
- Joan Van Ark as Valene Wallace

=== Special guest appearance by ===
- Barbara Eden as LeeAnn De La Vega (5 episodes)

=== Also starring ===
- Gayle Hunnicutt as Vanessa Beaumont (7 episodes)
- Susan Lucci as Hillary Taylor / Sheila Foley (6 episodes)
- John Harkins as Control (4 episodes)
- Clifton James as Duke Carlisle (4 episodes)
- Jared Martin as Steven "Dusty" Farlow (1 episode)

=== Notable guest stars ===
Besides the returning supporting cast, Deirdre Imershein (Jory Taylor) joins the series in a major story-arc. A minor character in the Paris arc (played by Padraic Terence Duffy, Patrick's son) is called Mark Harris, the name of the character played by Patrick Duffy in Man from Atlantis.

== DVD release ==
The fourteenth and final season of Dallas' was released by Warner Bros. Home Video, on a Region 1 DVD box set of five single-sided DVDs, on January 18, 2011. Like the other DVD sets of the show's last five seasons, it does not include any extras, besides the 23 episodes.

== Episodes ==
No. overall	No. in season	Title	Directed by	Written by	Original U.S. air date	Original U.K. air date	Prod. code	U.S. viewers (millions)
335	1	"April in Paris"	Leonard Katzman	Leonard Katzman	November 2, 1990	May 5, 1991	446151	17.2
Cally doesn't like hearing that James left J.R. in the sanitarium; while honeymooning in Paris, Bobby and April meet Sheila Foley, the widow of a Texas oilman who committed suicide when his company went bankrupt due to OPEC flooding the market with cheap oil; some of the patients at the sanitarium unknowingly destroy the document giving J.R. control of the WestStar stock and J.R. is frustrated to learn that Jessica has been transferred to another institution; Bobby and April are surprised to see Jordan Lee in Paris; having already made enemies in the sanitarium, J.R. is desperate to get out; Sheila kidnaps April and tells Bobby that she will be taking her place.
336	2	"Charade"	Irving J. Moore	Howard Lakin	November 9, 1990	May 12, 1991	446152	15.2
With little choice, Bobby is forced to agree to Sheila's terms; James loses a fortune, not to mention the nightclub he bought for Michelle to run, in a high-stakes poker game; still stuck in the sanitarium, J.R. manages to solve one of his problems; Liz's past is catching up with her; James is determined to prove that he is nothing like his father; things get more confusing for Bobby as he tries to get help finding April.
337	3	"One Last Kiss"	Leonard Katzman	Lisa Seidman	November 16, 1990	May 19, 1991	446153	15.2
At the sanitarium, J.R. finally manages to get a message to Sly, but then his doctor decides to start him on drug therapy; in Paris, Bobby is able to find where the kidnappers are holding April, but fails in his attempt to rescue her; Cally agrees to have J.R. released from the sanitarium, but first J.R. must agree to leave her alone following the divorce; J.R. fires Sly for allowing James to dupe her out of his release papers; Sheila reveals to Bobby that in order to gain access to an important oil conference with OPEC members in attendance, she needed to be, or pretend to be, the wife of an oilman; Bobby is shocked to learn that Jordan is a part of the kidnapping conspiracy.
338	4	"Terminus"	Irving J. Moore	Mitchell Wayne Katzman	November 23, 1990	May 26, 1991	446154	15.2
Sly is initially angry with James, blaming him for J.R. firing her, but then considers turning on J.R. when James suggests she use some of the dirt she has on J.R.; J.R. calls London to speak with John Ross and learns that Sue Ellen is now Mrs. Don Lockwood; Carter goes to Cliff offering his political support in return for a favor, but Cliff turns him down saying he doesn't need Carter's influence; Jordan pays the price for agreeing to help Bobby; Liz's criminal ex-boyfriend, Johnny, tracks her down in Dallas; J.R. is intent on destroying James and making him beg for forgiveness; gunfire erupts at the oil conference and someone is shot.
339	5	"Tunnel of Love"	Michael Preece	Howard Lakin	November 30, 1990	June 2, 1991	446155	15.3
Dallas reels from the news of April's death; heartbroken and alone, Bobby wanders the streets of Paris; Cliff asks Liz to marry him, but when she learns that Johnny was responsible for her brother's death, she is given the choice to marry Cliff or finally bring Johnny to justice; April's death leads James to try to make peace with J.R., but J.R. is not willing to listen; Liz rejects Cliff's proposal and ends their relationship; Bobby buys a detective agency and makes finding Sheila Foley their sole purpose; J.R. witnesses a public argument between Carter and a love-starved Rose and seizes the opportunity to gain some control over WestStar by giving Rose what she wants; Cliff is warned to never see Liz again; Bobby blames the oil business for April's death.
340	6	"Heart and Soul"	Nick Havinga	Lisa Seidman	December 7, 1990	June 9, 1991	446156	14.9
Michelle returns to Dallas furious that Bobby had April buried in Paris; Clayton also returns to Dallas, without Miss Ellie, to settle matters concerning the WestStar shares; not wanting to inadvertently hurt Bobby, Sly has a change of heart concerning her plan with James to get back at J.R.; however, James is as determined as ever to go ahead with the plan and takes Sly's records of J.R.'s misdeeds over the years; after Bobby tells Clayton to stay out of the oil business and just enjoy the rest of his life, Clayton offers the voting rights to the WestStar stock to Carter, so long as WestStar doesn't go after Ewing Oil; Cliff reacts badly when he sees Liz having dinner with Johnny; J.R. uses their indiscretion to blackmail Rose into bugging Carter's office at WestStar; Johnny tells Carter that he is going to take over WestStar; when Vanessa shows up at Ewing Oil, J.R. tells her that this time he's not letting her go; Johnny is found shot dead.
341	7	"The Fabulous Ewing Boys"	Michael Preece	Leonard Katzman	December 14, 1990	June 16, 1991	446157	14.8
J.R. apologizes to Sly for firing her and after she confesses that she gave James the information about J.R., he forgives her and hires her back; Carter threatens Rose to give him an alibi for the time of Johnny's murder; when Liz can't find Cliff, she wonders if he skipped town after killing Johnny; Vanessa is disappointed to learn that J.R. and James are not getting along; J.R. tells Vanessa that she is the one woman that he would be faithful to; during a conversation with Vanessa, Cally accidentally reveals that she is pregnant with J.R.'s child and she begs Vanessa not to tell J.R.; Michelle makes amends with Bobby; Bobby receives word that Sheila Foley has been found and then stuns J.R. by saying that he plans to sell Ewing Oil.
342	8	"The Odessa File"	Nick Havinga	Howard Lakin	December 21, 1990	June 23, 1991	446158	14.6
Carter tells Rose that the night of Johnny's murder he was in a top-secret meeting where he hoped to make a deal to sell his shares of WestStar; the Ewing lawyer informs J.R. that if Bobby wants to sell Ewing Oil, there is nothing J.R. can do to stop him and the Justice Department won't allow J.R. to own the company himself; Bobby is shocked to learn that the woman he met in Paris is not the real Sheila Foley; Rose confesses to Carter; J.R. tries to find someone who will buy Ewing Oil and then turn control of the company over to him, but when none of his friends are either rich or interested enough to do it, he attempts to make a deal with Carter in return for a tape J.R. has of Carter threatening Johnny; Bobby meets with LeeAnn De La Vega, a prospective buyer for Ewing Oil; J.R. asks Vanessa to marry him when his divorce is final; J.R. arrives too late to stop Bobby from selling Ewing Oil to LeeAnn.
343	9	"Sail On"	Michael Preece	Lisa Seidman	January 4, 1991	June 30, 1991	446159	16.8
Cliff's suspected involvement in Johnny's murder is putting his political future in jeopardy, ruining his relationship with Liz and causing him to drink; LeeAnn is out for revenge against J.R. and is disappointed when he doesn't recognize her; J.R. and Cally's divorce becomes final; Carter demands Rose do whatever she has to in order to get the tapes back from J.R.; at J.R. and Vanessa's engagement party, with Cally in attendance, James announces that Cally is pregnant with J.R.'s child; tired of being mistreated, Rose leaves Carter; Carter is arrested for Johnny's murder; Cally tells J.R. that James is the father of her child.
344	10	"Lock, Stock and Jock"	Nick Havinga	Mitchell Wayne Katzman	January 11, 1991	July 7, 1991	446160	16.5
J.R. confronts James with Cally's claim that James is the father of her baby and James, wanting to stick it to J.R., doesn't deny the accusation; with the threat of suspicion for Johnny's murder removed from their heads, Liz asks Cliff to propose to her again; the sale of Ewing Oil becomes final and after J.R. gets over the shock of seeing the Ewing Oil name gone, he accepts LeeAnn's offer to run the company in her absence in return for a small ownership of the company; LeeAnn tells Michelle that she met J.R. in college, became pregnant and after J.R. refused to marry her, she had an abortion that nearly killed her; J.R. asks Sly to keep working for LeeAnn so that she can spy on her; Carter gives the police his true alibi for the night of Johnny's murder, but the woman he was with refuses to corroborate his story; Bobby asks Liz to use her contacts to help him find the fake Sheila Foley; LeeAnn flirts with J.R. with the hope of ruining his relationship with Vanessa.
345	11	"'S' Is for Seduction"	Michael Preece	Howard Lakin	January 18, 1991	July 21, 1991	446161	14.4
LeeAnn reveals to Michelle that there is another aspect of her former relationship with J.R. that she hasn't told Michelle, but it is too painful to talk about; Liz tells Bobby that the fake Sheila Foley's real name is Hilary Taylor; during a conversation with Vanessa, Michelle embellishes her relationship with James, blames J.R. for breaking them up and lists numerous other ways J.R. hurt James; Carter's trial gets underway and later, he is eventually found guilty; when Vanessa expresses misgivings over LeeAnn possible feelings for J.R., J.R. dismisses her concern; Bobby learns that Hilary Taylor has a daughter; Cliff makes a confession.
346	12	"Designing Women"	Irving J. Moore	Lisa Seidman	February 1, 1991	July 28, 1991	446162	15.1
LeeAnn continues to play games with J.R. and dangles the possibility of getting Ewing Oil back in front of him; in the light of Cliff's confession to Johnny's murder, the DA, wanting to save face with the taxpayers for convicting an innocent man, manipulates evidence to have a mistrial declared and Carter is set free; realizing that her suspicions of J.R.'s fidelity are ruining their relationship, Vanessa ends her engagement to J.R. and returns to Vienna; with his name tarnished due to the trial, Carter is determined to find out who really killed Johnny; Bobby is having trouble letting go of the life he could have had with April; when J.R. informs LeeAnn that Vanessa has left and that he is now free to be with her, LeeAnn reveals their past connection and, before leaving, tells a stunned J.R. that Michelle is the new owner of what used to be Ewing Oil.
347	13	"90265"	Leonard Katzman	Leonard Katzman	February 8, 1991	August 4, 1991	446163	16.1
Michelle's first act as the new owner of the former Ewing Oil is to fire J.R., Sly and Phyllis; Bobby discovers that Jory Taylor, Hilary's daughter, is living in Malibu; J.R. laments that with Ewing Oil gone and Southfork practically empty, he feels all alone; depressed, he visits Sly at her apartment, and they wind up in bed together; as a further way to annoy J.R., Michelle convinces a somewhat reluctant James to marry her; J.R. asks James to move back to Southfork, but is livid when James moves in with his new wife; in order to get close to Jory to get information about Hilary, Bobby rents the beach house next to Jory's and lies about his last name; when he goes to his old office, J.R. is surprised to see the Ewing Oil name back on the wall, but disgusted when James announces that he is co-owner.
348	14	"Smooth Operator"	Larry Hagman	Lisa Seidman	February 15, 1991	August 11, 1991	446164	14.9
Hoping to gain an ally in getting revenge against LeeAnn, J.R. speaks with her sister-in-law who blames LeeAnn for over-working her brother to the point of death by a heart attack; Michelle wishes her marriage to James was a real marriage, but to James it is nothing more than a business arrangement; Jory opens up to Bobby about Hilary; when J.R. sees that a little kindness is changing James opinion of him and annoying Michelle, J.R. decides to give James the father he's always wanted; the boyfriend of one of Jory's roommates brings trouble to Bobby and Jory; J.R. sets up a plan to force Liz to sell her oil company to him.
349	15	"Win Some, Lose Some"	Patrick Duffy	Mitchell Wayne Katzman	March 1, 1991	August 18, 1991	446165	14.3
In order to secure an appointment for Cliff, Liz is compelled to sell her company to J.R.; when Jory is kidnapped, Bobby is forced to choose between saving Jory or capturing Hilary; Michelle attempts to seduce J.R. to show James that J.R. hasn't changed, but J.R. is more concerned about keeping his son; Cliff learns to whom Liz sold her company and why and his paranoia about being beaten by J.R. wrecks their relationship; Cliff wants revenge against J.R. and asks Michelle to help; Jory learns that Bobby only used her to find her mother, but Bobby won't hurt her by telling her why.
350	16	"Fathers and Sons and Fathers and Sons"	Larry Hagman	Arthur Bernard Lewis	March 8, 1991	August 25, 1991	446166	12.9
John Ross and Christopher are enjoying watching the joke that is James and Michelle's marriage; when Liz catches Cliff with another woman she realizes that there is no hope to salvage their engagement; Carter learns that Cliff was the one that murdered Johnny; Bobby decides to give up looking for Hilary and instead devote his time to being a good father to Christopher; the Ewing men participate in a cattle drive; J.R. meets a woman who claims to be James' wife and that he is the father of her son.
351	17	"When the Wind Blows"	Patrick Duffy	Louella Lee Caraway	March 29, 1991	September 1, 1991	446167	14.8
J.R. doesn't tell James about Deborah Lynn, the woman that claims to be his wife, and then worries that if James isn't legally married to Michelle, he will lose his 50% ownership of Ewing Oil; Carter wants Cliff to resign as Energy Czar and threatens to expose Cliff as Johnny's murderer; Bobby enjoys showing Christopher what he knows about cattle ranching; while J.R. starts to bond with his grandson, he tries to keep James and Deborah Lynn apart, at least until James can secure his shares of Ewing Oil; Bobby tries to be a friend to Cliff, but Cliff pushes him away; just as both J.R. and Michelle feel that they are going to have what they want, Deborah Lynn pushes her way into Southfork and announces to James that they are still married.
352	18	"Those Darned Ewings"	Dwight Adair	Ken Horton	April 5, 1991	September 8, 1991	446168	14.6
Jory comes to Dallas to tell Bobby that her mother has told her all about what happened in Paris; James and J.R. quickly fall in love with Jimmy, but John Ross is jealous of all the attention given his new nephew; J.R. realizes he may have to choose between losing Jimmy or losing Ewing Oil; wanting James to leave Michelle, Cliff tells James that there is nothing more important to a man than his son; James finally informs J.R. that he is the father of Cally's baby.
353	19	"Farewell, My Lovely"	Patrick Duffy	Lisa Seidman	April 12, 1991	September 15, 1991	446169	16.1
James tells J.R. to leave Cally and her baby alone and threatens J.R. with losing both James and Ewing Oil, but that doesn't deter J.R.; J.R. is elated when Clayton arrives with news that he is giving J.R. the voting rights to the WestStar stock, but then is angered after Clayton announces that Miss Ellie has deeded Southfork to Bobby; jealous of Jimmy and feeling neglected, John Ross tells Christopher that he wants to leave Southfork and live with Sue Ellen in London; J.R.'s detective locates Cally, but when he sees that she has found love again and is happy, he decides to leave her be; J.R. tells James that he doesn't care about Ewing Oil anymore and offers James the chance to work with him at his new company; James chooses to be with Jimmy and Deborah Lynn.
354	20	"Some Leave, Some Get Carried Out"	Leonard Katzman	Leonard Katzman	April 19, 1991	September 22, 1991	446170	16.1
Michelle is heartbroken after James tells her he is ending their marriage; Cliff seizes the opportunity to convince Michelle to sell him 50% of Ewing Oil and Michelle cons Cliff into paying what she paid for the whole company, but Cliff takes advantage of a drunken Michelle and gets her to marry him; after hearing J.R. forget his name when referring to 'his boys', John Ross has had enough and decides to move to London with Sue Ellen; tired of J.R. trying to control their lives, James and Deborah Lynn take Jimmy and move to Deborah Lynn's hometown; Hilary comes to Dallas to turn herself in and begs Jory not to abandon her; hungover and blaming J.R. for the end of her marriage to James, Michelle takes Cliff's gun, goes to Southfork and shoots someone.
355	21	"The Decline and Fall of the Ewing Empire"	Ken Kercheval	Lisa Seidman	April 26, 1991	September 29, 1991	446171	16.8
Michelle is arrested for killing Hilary; J.R. promises to get Michelle freed, but, in return, Michelle makes J.R. buy her 50% of Ewing Oil for what she paid for the whole company; J.R. is then shocked to find that he is equal partners with Cliff in the company, so when a couple of WestStar executives offer their support for J.R. to become the new Chairman of WestStar, he agrees to sell his 50% of Ewing Oil to Cliff; Carter surprises J.R. with the news that Dusty has sold him his shares of WestStar, the same ones to which J.R. had the voting rights; having lost Ewing Oil and WestStar and feeling abandoned by his family, J.R. becomes despondent and removes Jock's gun from his nightstand.
356	22	"Conundrum"	Leonard Katzman	Leonard Katzman	May 3, 1991	October 6, 1991	446172	33.3
357	23	"Conundrum"	Leonard Katzman	Leonard Katzman	May 3, 1991	October 6, 1991	446172	33.3
Feeling he has lost everyone and everything he cares about and nearing the point of suicide, J.R. is visited by Adam, who takes him on an It's a Wonderful Life-style journey to see what would have become of the Ewings had he never existed. J.R. continues his journey with Adam, seeing how the Ewing family would have evolved if he'd never existed; Bobby nears J.R.'s room as a gunshot rings out... In 2011, the whole two-part finale was ranked #13 on the TV Guide Network special, TV's Most Unforgettable Finales.
