= List of Dallas (1978 TV series) crew members =

Dallas is an American prime time television soap opera created by David Jacobs. Leonard Katzman was the showrunner, and writer/director, of more episodes than any other person during the series' fourteen-season run (357 episodes). The series was produced by Lorimar.

== Directorial staff ==
=== Recurring directors ===
- Leonard Katzman (68 episodes: seasons 2–8, 10–11 and 13–14; also writer and producer/executive producer.)
- Michael Preece (63 episodes: season 4–14)
- Irving J. Moore (52 episodes: seasons 1–5 and 12–14)
- Larry Hagman (32 episodes: seasons 3–14. Also series star (J.R.) and executive producer.)
- Patrick Duffy (29 episodes: seasons 4–8 and 10–14. Also series star (Bobby).)
- Nick Havinga (20 episodes: seasons 6–9 and 14)
- Gunnar Hellström (6 episodes: seasons 2–4 and 6. Also guest star during seasons 12 and 13 (Rolf Brundin).)
- Dwight Adair (5 episodes: seasons 10–11 and 13–14)
- Corey Allen (5 episodes: seasons 2 and 9)
- Gwen Arner (5 episodes: seasons 7–8)
- Cliff Fenneman (5 episodes: seasons 11–13. Also associate producer/co-producer/producer.)
- Linda Gray (5 episodes: seasons 9–12. Also series star (Sue Ellen).)
- Jerry Jameson (5 episodes: seasons 9–11)
- Linda Day (4 episodes: season 9)
- Leslie H. Martinson (4 episodes: seasons 2–3)
- David Paulsen (4 episodes: seasons 6 and 10–11. Also writer and story editor/producer)
- Robert Becker (3 episodes: seasons 8–9)
- Bruce Bilson (3 episodes: season 9)
- Robert Day (3 episodes, season 1)
- Steve Kanaly (3 episodes, seasons 10–12. Also series star (Ray).)
- Russ Mayberry (3 episodes, season 12)
- Alexander Singer (3 episodes, seasons 3 and 8)
- Barry Crane (2 episodes, season 2)
- Lawrence Dobkin (2 episodes, season 2)
- Bill Duke (2 episodes, season 6)
- Harry Harris (2 episodes, seasons 3 and 5)
- Ken Kercheval (2 episodes, seasons 13–14. Also series star (Cliff).)
- Vincent McEveety (2 episodes, season 2)

=== Single-episode directors ===
- Roy Campanella, Jr. (Season 9)
- William F. Claxton (Season 7)
- Ray Danton (Season 7)
- Dennis Donnelly (Season 2)
- Larry Elikann (Season 6)
- Victor French (Season 5)
- Michael A. Hoey (Season 9)
- Paul Krasny (Season 7)
- Joseph Manduke (Season 5)
- Alex March (Season 2)
- Don McDougall (Season 2)
- Ernest Pintoff (Season 6)
- Nicolas Sgarro (Season 6)
- Paul Stanley (Season 2)
- Robert C. Thompson (Season 6)

== Writing staff ==
=== Recurring writers ===
- Leonard Katzman (72 episodes (including 2 co-written), seasons 2–14. Also director and producer/executive producer.)
- Arthur Bernard Lewis (69 episodes (including 3 co-written), seasons 1–8 and 11–14. Also executive story editor/supervising producer.)
- David Paulsen (45 episodes, seasons 4–8 and 10–11. Also director and story editor/producer.)
- Howard Lakin (24 episodes (including 2 co-written), seasons 4–6 and 12–14. Also supervising producer.)
- Mitchell Wayne Katzman (19 episodes (including 2 co-written), seasons 10–14. Also story editor/co-producer.)
- Leah Markus (14 episodes, seasons 4 and 10–11. Also story consultant.)
- Lisa Seidman (13 episodes, seasons 13–14. Also executive story consultant.)
- Camille Marchetta (12 episodes, seasons 1–3. Also story editor.)
- Peter Dunne (11 episodes (including 6 co-written), seasons 8–9. Also supervising producer.)
- Joel J. Feigenbaum (10 episodes (including 6 co-written), season 9. Also executive story consultant.)
- Will Lorin (9 episodes, seasons 5–6 and 9)
- Rena Down (8 episodes, seasons 2–4. Also story editor.)
- Linda B. Elstad (7 episodes, seasons 3–6. Also story editor.)
- Louella Lee Caraway (7 episodes, seasons 10–14. Also executive coordinator.)
- Calvin Clements, Jr. (6 episodes, season 10. Also supervision producer.)
- Hollace White & Stephanie Garman (6 episodes, season 9. Also story editors.)
- David Jacobs (5 episodes, seasons 1–3. Also creator and creative consultant.)
- Loraine Despres (3 episodes, seasons 3–4)
- D. C. Fontana & Richard Fontana (3 episodes, seasons 2–3)
- Robert J. Shaw (3 episodes, seasons 4. Also story editor.)
- Ken Horton (2 episodes, seasons 13–14. Also co-executive producer.)
- Susan Howard (2 episodes, seasons 9–10. Also series star (Donna).)
- Bill Taub (2 episodes, seasons 9)
- Worley Thorne (2 episodes, seasons 2–3)

=== Single-episode writers ===
- Virginia Aldrige (Season 1)
- Deanne Barkley (Season 9)
- Darlene Craviotto (Season 2)
- Louis Elias (Season 4)
- Frank Furino (Season 6)
- Jonathan Hales (Season 12)
- Jim Inman (Season 2, co-written with Arthur Bernard Lewis)
- Simon Masters (Season 12)
- Bruce Shelly (Season 5)
- Robert Sherman (Season 6)
- Barbara Searles (Season 3)
- Amy Tebo (Season 13)
- Jeff Young (Season 3)
- Jackie Zabel & Bryce Zabel (Season 13)

== Production team ==
=== Executive producers ===
- Seasons 1–3: Lee Rich and Philip Capice
- Seasons 4–9: Philip Capice
- Seasons 10–11: Leonard Katzman
- Seasons 12: Leonard Katzman and Larry Hagman
- Seasons 13–14: Leonard Katzman & Larry Hagman, and Ken Horton (co-executive producer)

=== Producers ===
- Seasons 1–8: Leonard Katzman
- Season 9: James H. Brown
- Seasons 10–11: David Paulsen
- Season 12: Howard Larkin, and Mitchell Wayne Katzman & Cliff Fenneman (co-producers)
- Seasons 13–14 Cliff Fenneman and Mitchell Wayne Katzman (co-producer)

=== Associate producers ===
- Seasons 1–11: Cliff Fenneman
- Seasons 13–14: Frank Katzman and John Rettino

=== Supervising producers ===
- Seasons 5–8: Arthur Bernard Lewis
- Season 9: Peter Dunne
- Season 10: Calvin Clements, Jr.
- Seasons 11–12: Arthur Bernard Lewis
- Seasons 13–14: Howard Lakin

=== Story editors ===
- Seasons 2–3: Arthur Bernard Lewis (executive story editor) and Camille Marchetta
- Season 4: Arthur Bernard Lewis (executive story editor), and Camille Marchetta, Rena Down & Robert J. Shaw
- Season 5: Linda B. Elstad
- Seasons 6–8: David Paulsen
- Season 9: Hollace White and Stephanie Garman
- Seasons 10–11: Mitchell Wayne Katzman
- Seasons 12–14: Louella Lee Caraway (executive coordinator)

=== Story consultants ===
- Seasons 1–2: David Jacobs (executive script consultant/creative consultant)
- Season 9: Joel J. Feigenbaum (executive story consultant), and Leonard Katzman (creative consultant)
- Seasons 10–11: Leah Markus
- Seasons 13–14: Lisa Seidman (executive story consultant)
