= Dallas season 4 =

Dallas
- Season 4
- DVD cover
- No. of episodes: 23

Release
- Original network: CBS
- Original release: November 7, 1980 – May 1, 1981

Season chronology
- ← Previous; Season 3 Next → Season 5

The fourth season of the television series Dallas aired on CBS during the 1980–81 TV season.

== Cast ==
=== Starring ===
In alphabetical order:

- Barbara Bel Geddes as Miss Ellie Ewing (23 episodes)
- Jim Davis as Jock Ewing (21 episodes)
- Patrick Duffy as Bobby Ewing (23 episodes)
- Linda Gray as Sue Ellen Ewing (23 episodes)
- Larry Hagman as J. R. Ewing (23 episodes)
- Steve Kanaly as Ray Krebbs (23 episodes)
- Ken Kercheval as Cliff Barnes (23 episodes)
- Victoria Principal as Pamela Barnes Ewing (23 episodes)
- Charlene Tilton as Lucy Ewing Cooper (22 episodes)

=== Also starring ===
- Leigh McCloskey as Mitch Cooper (20 episodes)
- Susan Howard as Donna Culver Krebbs (19 episodes)
- Susan Flannery as Leslie Stewart (11 episodes)
- Mary Crosby as Kristin Shepard (7 episodes)
- Randolph Powell as Alan Beam (1 episode)

=== Special guest stars ===
- Monte Markham as Clint Ogden (9 episodes)
- William Smithers as Jeremy Wendell (8 episodes)
- Priscilla Pointer as Rebecca Barnes Wentworth (6 episodes)
- Anne Francis as Arliss Cooper (4 episodes)
- E.J. André as Eugene Bullock (2 episodes)
- Joanna Cassidy as Sally Bullock (2 episodes)
- Howard Keel as Clayton Farlow (2 episodes)
- John Lehne as Kyle Bennett (2 episodes)

=== Notable guest stars ===
Jared Martin returns as Steven "Dusty" Farlow, and long-running supporting actors Morgan Woodward (Punk Anderson), Tyler Banks (John Ross Ewing III), Audrey Landers (Afton Cooper), Deborah Tranelli (Phyllis Wapner) and Laurence Haddon (Franklin Horner) all appear for the first time. Additionally, William Windom appears in two episodes as Amos Krebbs who knows the truth about Ray's real father. Joel Fabiani (Alex Ward) appears in several episodes, but won't return for subsequent seasons, and Christopher Stone (Dave Stratton) appear in four episodes and will later return for season 8. Ted Shackelford and Joan Van Ark (Gary and Valene Ewing) cross over from Dallas spinoff Knots Landing for three and two episodes, respectively.

== Crew ==
The season's episode writers include showrunner Leonard Katzman, the returning Arthur Bernard Lewis, Linda B. Elstad, Loraine Despres, and Rena Down, and as well as new additions Robert J. Shaw, Leah Markus, Howard Lakin, Louis Elias, and David Paulsen. Philip Capice continues to serve as sole executive producer, as Lee Rich, left the show after the previous season. Katzman serves as producer, and Cliff Fenneman as associate producer. Arthur Bernard Lewis continues as executive story editor, with Camille Marchetta, Rena Down, and Robert J. Shaw serving as story editors.

== Production ==
Like many other shows on air in 1980, production of Dallas was impacted by the 1980 actors strike, which delayed the show returning to screens until November 1980. However, this only slightly lessened the length of the season with 23 episodes being broadcast up to May 1981.

Additionally, the American Federation of Musicians was concurrently part of the strike action (which affected film and television productions between July and October 1980) and so the first 14 episodes of the fourth season of Dallas did not feature music from any of its regular composers, save for a new rendition of Jerrold Immel's main theme. In lieu of this, Lorimar utilised composers and musicians from overseas (such as the English composer John Scott, who went uncredited) or used stock music recordings, some of which was not in keeping with the show's tone and style.

== DVD release ==
Dallas season four was released by Warner Bros. Home Video, on a Region 1 DVD box set of four double-sided DVDs, on January 24, 2006. In addition to the 23 episodes, it also includes the cast reunion special Dallas Reunion: The Return to Southfork which originally aired on CBS on November 7, 2004.

== Knots Landing ==
The Dallas cast continued to make occasional appearance in spinoff series Knots Landing, which was on its second year: J.R. (Larry Hagman) appeared in A Family Matter (airing on January 22, 1981) and Designs (March 26, 1981); Bobby (Patrick Duffy) in The Loudest Word (February 19, 1981); and Kristin (Mary Crosby) in Kristin (December 18, 1980, her only Knots Landing appearance).

== Episodes ==
No. overall	No. in season	Title	Directed by	Written by	Original U.S. air date	Original U.K. air date	Prod. code	Rating/share (households)
55	1	"No More Mister Nice Guy: Part 1"	Leonard Katzman	Arthur Bernard Lewis	November 7, 1980	November 9, 1980	189002	38.2/61
A cleaning woman discovers J.R. sprawled across the floor of his office. He is rushed to the hospital, close to death. The Ewing family reassembles to wait for news of his fate and police search for clues and suspects in the shooting. The family hopes for J.R. to regain consciousness and be able to shed some light on the identity of his assailant.
56	2	"No More Mister Nice Guy: Part 2"	Leonard Katzman	Arthur Bernard Lewis	November 9, 1980	November 15, 1980	189003	40.0/59
As J.R. undergoes his second operation, Bobby takes over Ewing Oil with Jock's blessing. Sue Ellen tries to combat the guilt that makes her believe she may have shot her husband in a drunken stupor. Alan Beam is brought back to Dallas by the police. Cliff is taken into custody when a fired gun is found in his apartment. Marilee Stone institutes a multi-million-dollar lawsuit against the Ewings. Lucy meets a poor medical student who resists her advances.
57	3	"Nightmare"	Irving J. Moore	Linda B. Elstad	November 14, 1980	November 21, 1980	189004	35.7/56
J.R. fights to overcome the helplessness of his paralysis. Jock finds the gun used to shoot J.R., and the evidence points to someone in the immediate family. Sue Ellen tries to deal with her continuing nightmares that indicate she is the one who shot her husband. J.R.'s power is felt throughout Dallas as Cliff is suspended from his job and Bobby is frustrated in his efforts to run Ewing Oil. Sue Ellen is arrested for J.R.'s shooting when her fingerprints are discovered on the gun Jock found.
58	4	"Who Done It"	Leonard Katzman	Loraine Despres	November 21, 1980	November 22, 1980	189005	53.3/76
Sue Ellen is devastated when the Ewings abandon her, leaving her to languish in jail. After bail is mysteriously posted from an unknown source, Sue Ellen seeks solace from Kristin. She then attempts to find answers through hypnosis sessions with her psychiatrist, Dr. Ellby. These sessions lead to the answer of who shot J.R.?
59	5	"Taste of Success"	Leonard Katzman	Robert J. Shaw	November 28, 1980	November 29, 1980	189006	34.0/56
When Kristin announces that she is carrying J.R.'s baby from their affair, he makes sure all charges are dropped against her and she goes away to California to have her baby in private while receiving regular checks from J.R. via his lawyers. Bobby, Ewing Oil's new president, finds the power intoxicating, which promotes apprehension in both Pamela and J.R. Bobby works hard to buy an oil refinery – something Jock has always wanted and which J.R. could never accomplish. When J.R. learns of his brother's intention, he tries to sabotage Bobby's plan, which leads to another inevitable clash between the brothers.
60	6	"The Venezuelan Connection"	Leonard Katzman	Leah Markus	December 5, 1980	December 6, 1980	189007	37.3/62
The conflict between J.R. and Bobby escalates when Bobby refuses to step down as president of Ewing Oil. Jock finds himself caught in the middle of the conflict between his two sons but after Miss Ellie demands that Bobby stay in Dallas Jock supports Bobby. Bobby seems to be doing a better job for Ewing Oil, even making a deal for Venezuelan oil to the new refinery, but quickly discovers he's being undercut in Dallas' business community by a vengeful J.R. Pam continues to search for her mother. Lucy introduces Mitch to her friends with disastrous results.
61	7	"The Fourth Son"	Irving J. Moore	Howard Lakin	December 12, 1980	December 20, 1980	189008	35.8/60
The sinking of an oil tanker and the loss of 600,000 gallons of crude oil has J.R. delighted, but to Bobby, it is only an inconvenience. Then he discovers that the oil was not insured and the loss could total over $18,000,000 for Ewing Oil. Ray greets a very unwelcome guest, his father, whom he hasn't seen or heard from since he was a kid. Amos Krebbs has some very disturbing news for the entire Ewing family: Ray's biological father is Jock Ewing!
62	8	"Trouble at Ewing 23"	Leonard Katzman	Louis Elias	December 19, 1980	December 25, 1980	189009	33.8/56
An extortionist, threatening to blow up Ewing 23, gives J.R. an opportunity to put a halt on his fading fortunes with the company and the family by outmaneuvering Bobby. Ray has to come to grips with his new-found identity as Jock's son and face the fact that he may be losing Donna to Cliff Barnes.
63	9	"The Prodigal Mother"	Irving J. Moore	David Paulsen	January 2, 1981	January 10, 1981	189010	36.1/59
Pamela believes that she has at last found her mother. Lucy asks Mitch to marry her. J.R. closes in on what he thinks is his brother's reckless running of Ewing Oil. The woman Pam thinks is her mother dashes all hopes for a reconciliation and Pam abandons her quest. Lucy and Mitch defy all of the built-in pitfalls of their romance. J.R. stumbles onto a scheme which he intends to use to put Bobby in trouble with their father.
64	10	"Executive Wife"	Leonard Katzman	Rena Down	January 9, 1981	January 17, 1981	189011	33.9/56
J.R. encourages Jock to consummate a business deal, fully aware that the venture will conflict with Bobby's investment plans and leave Ewing Oil with a serious cash flow problem. Pam, feeling that she places a poor second to her husband's work, receives the attention she is lacking from Bobby when she meets Alex Ward. Lucy makes an announcement which is unsettling to the Ewing clan.
65	11	"End of the Road: Part I"	Irving J. Moore	Leonard Katzman	January 16, 1981	January 24, 1981	189012	33.4/55
J.R. is quick to capitalize on Bobby's rash emotional action to Jock's business deal. Mitch's sister and mother arrive for the upcoming wedding of Mitch and Lucy. J.R. takes an immediate interest in his sister, Afton, which worries Sue Ellen. Bobby finds himself in a tough position after he enters into an oil drilling agreement which will put the company back on good terms with the cartel, even though he knows that Jock has already invested its capital in the land development. J.R. delights in the bind in which his brother has placed the company and investigates a scheme of his own to make Bobby look bad in their father's eyes.
66	12	"End of the Road: Part II"	Irving J. Moore	Leonard Katzman	January 23, 1981	January 31, 1981	189013	36.4/58
Gary and Valene return for Lucy and Mitch's wedding, at which events have far more impact on the Ewing family than is apparent to the assembled guests. Sue Ellen discovers J.R. getting much too friendly with Afton and consequently makes her own play for an old boyfriend Clint Ogden. J.R. is not as delighted as he expected to be when Bobby resigns as president of Ewing Oil. Miss Ellie shocks Jock by accusing him of behavior for which she can never forgive him.
67	13	"Making of a President"	Gunnar Hellström	Arthur Bernard Lewis	January 30, 1981	February 7, 1981	189014	34.8/55
J.R. may have met his match in Leslie Stewart, a high-pressure public relations woman whom he hires to improve his tarnished image as he resumes the reins of Ewing Oil. The prospect of a national image as the all-American businessman is attractive to J.R., but even more so is Leslie, who proposes working to replace his horns with a halo. J.R. is confused by Bobby's actions after giving up the presidency of the company, as is Pam, who Sue Ellen discovers is having rendezvous with Alex. At Southfork, coolness prevails as Miss Ellie is unforgiving of Jock for his part in the recent events in the Ewing family.
68	14	"Start the Revolution With Me"	Larry Hagman	Rena Down	February 6, 1981	February 14, 1981	189015	31.6/50
J.R. takes steps to re-establish his power and increase his wealth, even if it means reshaping history and violating the laws of the land. His campaign for power puts him further under the influence of Leslie who, much to his frustration, keeps him at arms length. He also goes ahead with his plans to topple the government who confiscated his foreign oil fields even though it could lead to prison time if he is caught. Bobby's ambition to purchase a solar energy company again alienates him from Pam. Sue Ellen combats Leslie by resuming an old friendship with Clint Ogden. Cliff is disappointed by Donna. Miss Ellie is still resentful of Ray's influence with Jock.
69	15	"The Quest"	Gunnar Hellström	Robert J. Shaw	February 13, 1981	February 21, 1981	189016	30.6/52
J.R.'s conniving affects the lives of Bobby, Pam, Cliff, Donna, and Ray. J.R.'s influence seems to have no bounds as he works to make sure that Cliff does not get chosen to run for public office. When his plans backfire and draw in Bobby and Pam, he is even more pleased at what fortune has brought him, which even includes an implied promise from Leslie. Sue Ellen can't get anyone to believe that she is being followed and J.R. could not care less. So she takes matters into her own hands, which results in a shocking revelation.
70	16	"Lover, Come Back"	Irving J. Moore	Leonard Katzman	February 20, 1981	February 28, 1981	189017	34.8/58
Sue Ellen is shocked to find that Dusty Farlow is still alive but unwilling to resume their old relationship. Luck seems to follow J.R. as his foreign coup brings the cartel back to Ewing Oil. Jock has his own surprise for the family. Donna and Ray are reunited and plan to marry. Mitch discovers that Lucy has been lying to him.
71	17	"The New Mrs. Ewing"	Patrick Duffy	Linda B. Elstad	February 27, 1981	March 7, 1981	189018	30.2/52
Donna becomes the new Mrs. Ewing when she and Ray marry. The newlywed's happiness is not reflected in the rest of the Ewing family as the cold war between Jock and Miss Ellie escalates. Bobby forms a new alliance with Cliff, but his growing jealousy over Pam compels him to a confrontation with Alex Ward. Lucy is happy to win the title of "Miss Young Dallas" which again makes Mitch feel inferior. Leslie succeeds in driving a wedge between J.R. and the cartel to further her own ambitions.
72	18	"Mark of Cain"	Larry Hagman	Leah Markus	March 13, 1981	March 21, 1981	189019	32.3/55
J.R. succumbs to the cunning of Leslie, who now knows she has the head of Ewing Oil right where she wants him. Bobby is caught in the middle of Jock and Miss Ellie's feud. He is put in the same uncomfortable position while taking his new place on the Senate committee which will decide the future of Takapa. Pam enters a new phase in the relationship with her and Cliff's mother. Sue Ellen continues to seek comfort from Clint. Lucy, the new "Miss Young Dallas", makes life very difficult for Mitch.
73	19	"The Gathering Storm"	Michael Preece	Robert J. Shaw	March 27, 1981	March 28, 1981	189020	32.1/54
Discord haunts the head of the Ewing clan as Jock threatens to sell Ewing Oil if Miss Ellie divorces him and Jock orders J.R. to prepare the deal. Jock and Ellie become even more estranged when they learn Bobby is on the Senate committee investigating the Takapa development project. Lucy's "Miss Young Dallas" career is actively driving a wedge into her marriage to Mitch. Cliff gets wind of J.R.'s involvement in the Asian oil scam. Pam warns her mother about Cliff's motives. Clint urges Sue Ellen to divorce J.R..
74	20	"Ewing vs. Ewing"	Irving J. Moore	Leah Markus	April 3, 1981	April 11, 1981	189021	30.0/53
Donna and Ray try to reconcile Jock and Miss Ellie, and find there is more to their discontent than the Takapa project. Ellie has consulted an attorney regarding divorce. J.R. accelerates his efforts to sell-out Ewing Oil. Leslie's past dealings are revealed when her ex-husband shows up in Dallas. Cliff learns about his mother from Pam. Bobby stuns everyone at the Senate hearings on Takapa. Meanwhile, the differences between Mitch and Lucy grow wider.
75	21	"New Beginnings"	Irving J. Moore	Arthur Bernard Lewis	April 10, 1981	April 18, 1981	189022	30.0/54
Jock and Miss Ellie's reconciliation results in a second honeymoon for them, but it stalls J.R.'s scheme to sell Ewing Oil. WestStar Oil's Jeremy Wendell plots revenge on J.R. for reneging on their deal. Donna threatens J.R. after he sets up Ray for a falling-out with the family. Sue Ellen meets Clint's wife. Leslie earns applause from her ex-husband for manipulating J.R.. Cliff vacillates about meeting his and Pam's mother. A peaceful moment for Sue Ellen and J.R. is broken by the news that Kristin has given birth to a baby boy. (This episode marks the final appearance of Jock Ewing by actor Jim Davis, who would pass away on April 26, 1981.)
76	22	"Full Circle"	Michael Preece	Arthur Bernard Lewis	April 17, 1981	April 25, 1981	189023	31.3/56
Kristin returns and reveals another scheme. Sue Ellen meets Dusty again. Lucy moves out on Mitch. Cliff uses WestStar's help in building evidence against J.R. and hands it over to Bobby's Senate committee. J.R. consults a lawyer about gaining custody of John Ross. Rebecca and Cliff meet at last.
77	23	"Ewing-Gate"	Leonard Katzman	Leonard Katzman	May 1, 1981	May 2, 1981	189024	32.9/56
J.R. gets a security force to keep the press away from Southfork in light of the recent news of the impending investigation. Kristin comes to Ewing Oil and asks J.R. for more money, threatening to cause further scandal to the Ewings if he doesn't pay up. Sue Ellen attempts to collect John Ross from Southfork, but J.R. catches her and steals him back, threatening to kill Sue Ellen if she tries to steal him away again. Pam witnesses this and J.R. threatens to destroy her to if she doesn't stay out of his way. The Senate committee find J.R. and Ewing Oil innocent after J.R. finds the evidence the Senate committee have against him. He immediately returns to the office and sacks Louella for not warning key witness to leave the country and avoid being subpoenaed. Kristin turns up in Dallas calls someone in California and says that a certain someone is going to pay for spurning her. Sue Ellen asks Pam to kidnap John Ross and bring him to her. J.R. discovers this and orders his security guards to find Pam. Cliff arrives at Southfork that night and sees a female body floating in the pool. He jumps in, discovers she's dead and sees J.R. looking down from the broken balcony.
