= Dallas (TV series) =

American prime time soap opera (1978–1991)

- Title card designed by Wayne Fitzgerald
- Created by: David Jacobs
- Written by: List of writers
- Directed by: List of directors
- Starring: Barbara Bel Geddes; Jim Davis; Patrick Duffy; Larry Hagman; Victoria Principal; Charlene Tilton; Linda Gray; Steve Kanaly; Ken Kercheval; Susan Howard; Howard Keel; Priscilla Beaulieu Presley; Donna Reed; Dack Rambo; Sheree J. Wilson; George Kennedy; Cathy Podewell; Kimberly Foster; Sasha Mitchell; Lesley-Anne Down; Barbara Stock
- Theme music composer: Jerrold Immel
- Country of origin: United States
- Original language: English
- No. of seasons: 14
- No. of episodes: 357 (list of episodes)

Production
- Executive producers: Philip Capice; Lee Rich; Leonard Katzman; Larry Hagman
- Producers: Leonard Katzman; James H. Brown; David Paulsen; Howard Lakin; Cliff Fenneman
- Running time: 47–50 minutes
- Production companies: Lorimar Productions; Lorimar-Telepictures; Lorimar Television

Original release
- Network: CBS
- Release: April 2, 1978 – May 3, 1991

Related
- Dallas: The Early Years; Dallas: J.R. Returns; Dallas: War of the Ewings; Dallas (2012); Knots Landing

Dallas is an American prime time soap opera that aired on CBS from April 2, 1978, to May 3, 1991. The series revolved around an affluent and feuding Texas family, the Ewings, who owned the independent oil company Ewing Oil and the cattle-ranching land of Southfork. The series originally focused on the marriage of Bobby Ewing and Pam Ewing, whose families were sworn enemies. As the series progressed, Bobby's elder brother, oil tycoon J. R. Ewing, became the show's breakout character, whose schemes and dirty business became the show's trademark. When the show ended on May 3, 1991, J. R. was the only character to have appeared in every episode.

The show was known for its cliffhangers, including the "Who shot J.R.?" mystery. The 1980 episode "Who Done It" remains the second-highest-rated primetime telecast ever. The show also featured a "Dream Season", in which the entirety of season 9 was revealed to have been a dream of Pamela Ewing. After 14 seasons, the series finale "Conundrum" aired in 1991.

The show had an ensemble cast, with Larry Hagman as greedy, scheming oil tycoon J. R. Ewing, stage/screen actress Barbara Bel Geddes as family matriarch Miss Ellie and Western movie actor Jim Davis as Ewing patriarch Jock, his last role before his death in 1981. The series won four Emmy Awards, including a 1980 Outstanding Lead Actress in a Drama Series for Bel Geddes.

With its 357 episodes, Dallas remains one of the longest lasting full-hour prime time dramas in American TV history. Dallas also spawned a spin-off series, Knots Landing, in 1979, which also lasted 14 seasons and a total of 344 episodes.

In 2007, Dallas was included in Time magazine's list of "100 Best TV Shows of All-Time".

The series finale had a cliffhanger that was resolved in the first of two subsequent reunion films: Dallas: J.R. Returns. The second, Dallas: War of the Ewings, aired in 1998. This was followed by a retrospective special, Dallas Reunion: The Return to Southfork, in 2004.

In 2010, TNT announced it had ordered a new, updated continuation of Dallas, ignoring the events of the two reunion films. The revival series, continuing the story of the Ewing family, premiered on TNT on June 13, 2012, and ran for three seasons, ending its run on September 22, 2014.

== Original premise ==
Dallas debuted on April 2, 1978, as a five-part miniseries on CBS. Although the miniseries was created as the series' pilot, by the time it was aired, neither the producers nor the network were hopeful that it would continue beyond these five episodes and had no plans for expansion. It was shown in a late Sunday night time-slot, known for low ratings. However, the miniseries proved popular enough to be turned into a regular series and broadcast for 13 full seasons from September 23, 1978, to May 3, 1991. The five pilot episodes, originally considered a miniseries, are now referred to as season 1, making fourteen seasons in total.

The show is known for its portrayal of wealth, sex, intrigue, conflict and power struggles. Throughout the series, the main premise is the longtime rivalry between the Ewing and Barnes families, which came to a head when the Barnes daughter Pamela (Victoria Principal) eloped with youngest Ewing son Bobby (Patrick Duffy), in the first episode. The series is largely set in Dallas, Texas, and fictional Braddock County, where the Southfork Ranch is located.

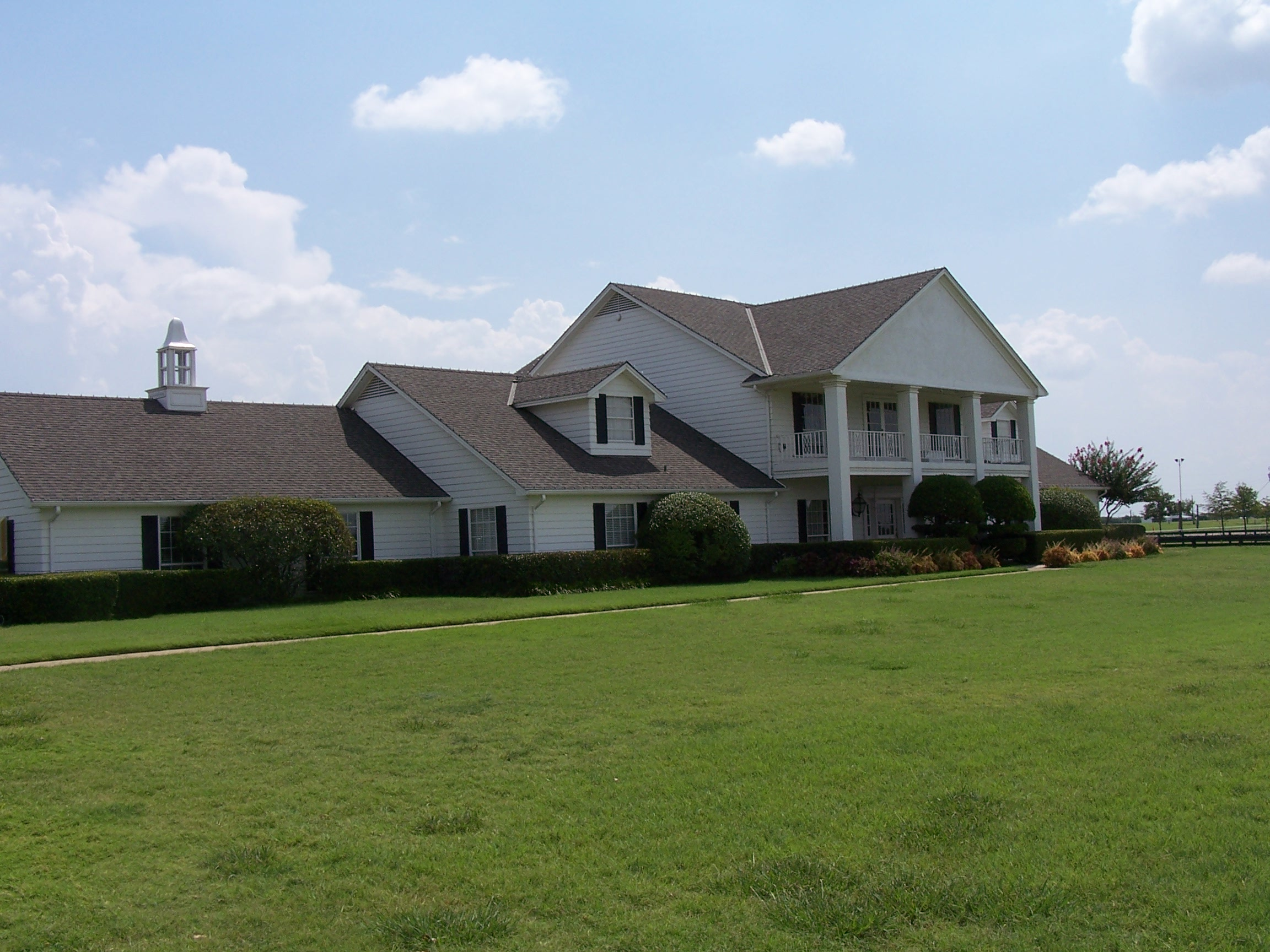
The Southfork Ranch, home of the Ewing family

The backstory was that, in the 1930s, wildcatter John Ross "Jock" Ewing (Jim Davis) had allegedly cheated his one-time partner, Willard "Digger" Barnes (David Wayne/Keenan Wynn), out of his share of their company Ewing Oil, and married Digger's only love, Eleanor "Miss Ellie" Southworth (Barbara Bel Geddes/Donna Reed). In contrast to Jock, Miss Ellie came from a long line of ranchers with great love for the land and the cattle. Following their marriage, the Southworth family ranch, Southfork, became the Ewings' home, where Jock and Miss Ellie raised three sons: J.R. (Larry Hagman), Gary (David Ackroyd/Ted Shackelford) and Bobby (Patrick Duffy).

J.R., unscrupulous and unhappily married to former Miss Texas beauty queen Sue Ellen Shepard (Linda Gray), was frequently at odds with Bobby, who had the morals and integrity that J.R. lacked. Middle son Gary was Miss Ellie's favorite as he displayed Southworth traits; however, Gary had conflicted with both Jock and J.R. since childhood and was dismissed as a weak link. At 17, Gary secretly met and married 15-year-old waitress Valene Clements (Joan Van Ark), producing the first Ewing grandchild - petite and saucy Lucy (Charlene Tilton) - before returning to Southfork with the intention of settling down. Although Jock warmed to Valene and supported Gary's fledgling family, J.R. pressured Gary into alcoholism by landing him with bad business deals that caused him to flee Southfork. With Gary gone, J.R. persecuted Valene until she left the ranch and the state, leaving Lucy to be raised by her grandparents.

During the first episodes of the series, teenage Lucy is seen sleeping with ranch foreman Ray Krebbs (Steve Kanaly). Later, in season 4, Ray was revealed to be Jock's illegitimate son through an extramarital affair during World War II. Unhappy with his small, one-dimensional role, Kanaly had considered leaving the show; to add depth to the Ray character, Hagman suggested that the writers create a plot wherein Ray becomes half-brother to J.R., Gary, and Bobby, noting his resemblance to Davis. The episodes where Ray and his niece Lucy had a fling are, as Kanaly told Dinah Shore in an appearance on her show, "prayerfully forgotten, I hope".

Ray had previously engaged in a short fling with Pamela, but she left him and married Bobby, and the pilot episode begins with the two of them arriving at Southfork Ranch as newlyweds, shocking the entire family. J.R., who loathed the Barnes family, was not happy with Pam's living at Southfork, and constantly tried to undermine her marriage to Bobby. Meanwhile, Pam's brother Cliff (Ken Kercheval), who had inherited Digger's hatred towards the Ewings, shared J.R.'s objections to the marriage and continued his father's quest to get revenge.

Most of the seasons ended with ratings-grabbing cliffhangers, the most notable being the season 3 finale "A House Divided", which launched the landmark "Who shot J.R.?" storyline and was ranked No. 69 on TV Guide's list of "TV's Top 100 Episodes of All Time". Other season finale cliffhangers include an unidentified female corpse in the Southfork swimming pool (season 4); a blazing house fire (season 6); Bobby's death (season 8) and subsequent resurrection (season 9); and J.R.'s apparent suicide (season 14).

== Cast and characters ==
=== Main cast ===
The original Ewing family. From left to right: Ray Krebbs, Bobby, Pamela, Miss Ellie, Jock, Lucy, J.R. and Sue Ellen.

For the original five-episodes miniseries (season 1) six actors received star billing: Barbara Bel Geddes as matriarch Miss Ellie Ewing, whose family were the original owners of Southfork; Jim Davis as her husband Jock Ewing, the founder of Ewing Oil and head of the Ewing family; Patrick Duffy as their youngest son, Bobby; Victoria Principal as Pamela Barnes Ewing, the daughter of the rival Barnes family whom Bobby brings home as his wife in the pilot episode; Larry Hagman as J.R. Ewing, the oldest son, who strongly objects to his new sister-in-law; and Charlene Tilton as Lucy, Bobby's, J.R.'s and Ray's teenage niece, who adores Bobby and Ray but resents J.R. for disposing of her parents in order for her to be raised by "true Ewings".

Not receiving top billing during season 1, although appearing in the majority of the episodes, were Linda Gray as Sue Ellen, J.R.'s long-suffering, alcoholic wife; Steve Kanaly as Pam's ex-boyfriend Ray Krebbs, a Southfork ranch hand who would later turn out to be Jock's illegitimate son; and Ken Kercheval as Pam's brother Cliff Barnes, J.R.'s archrival. Gray and Kanaly were promoted to the regular cast as of the first episode of season 2 and Kercheval as of the first episode of season 3. David Wayne received guest star billing as Willard "Digger" Barnes.

Further on in the series, several new characters were added as the original actors departed the series:

For season 5, after guest starring since season 2, Susan Howard joined the main cast as Donna Culver Krebbs, politician and widow of a former Texas governor, who becomes Ray's first wife and mother to his daughter Margaret.

Season 8 saw Howard Keel promoted to the star cast after appearing since season 4 as wealthy, occasionally hot-tempered rancher Clayton Farlow, Miss Ellie's husband following Jock's death, and of Priscilla Beaulieu Presley as Bobby's teenage sweetheart Jenna Wade, who gives birth to Bobby's only biological child, Lucas, and eventually becomes Ray's second wife. Jenna had previously been played by Morgan Fairchild for a season 2 episode, and Francine Tacker for two episodes in season 3 before the role was permanently taken over by Presley in season 7. Donna Reed also joined the main cast during season 8, temporarily portraying Miss Ellie until Barbara Bel Geddes returned in the following year.

Dack Rambo, portraying wandering cousin Jack Ewing, was promoted to regular status for season 10, after having appeared regularly since the end of season 8. However, he was written out of the show midway through the tenth season. Jack's sister Jamie Ewing (Jenilee Harrison) appeared in season 8. Jack's ex-wife April Stevens Ewing, played by Sheree J. Wilson, first appeared during seasons 10 and 11, before being promoted to a main character for season 12. Originally a scheming character, April eventually became Bobby's second wife after his divorce from Pam.

Season 13 saw several additions to the main cast: Academy Award winner George Kennedy as Carter McKay, who buys Ray's ranch and eventually becomes the head of Ewing Oil rival WestStar; Cathy Podewell as the young and naïve Cally Harper Ewing, J.R.'s second wife, whom he married to escape false rape charges; Sasha Mitchell as J.R.'s illegitimate firstborn son, James Beaumont; Kimberly Foster as April's devious sister Michelle Stevens, who marries both James and Cliff Barnes; and finally Lesley-Anne Down as PR woman Stephanie Rogers. While Kennedy and Podewell had appeared regularly throughout season 12, Mitchell, Foster and Down's characters were all new to the series when they joined the regular cast.

Finally, for the 14th and final season, after guest starring in the last episodes of season 13, Barbara Stock joined the cast as Cliff's fiancée Liz Adams.

=== Supporting cast ===
The Barnes-Wentworth family. Clockwise from top right: Cliff Barnes, Pamela Barnes Ewing, Rebecca Barnes Wentworth and Katherine Wentworth.

During its 14-year run, Dallas saw several actors appearing in supporting roles. The most notable include:

- David Wayne (seasons 1–2) and Keenan Wynn (season 3) as Willard "Digger" Barnes, alcoholic wildcatter father of Cliff, legal father of Pam and sworn enemy of Jock;
- Colleen Camp (season 2) and Mary Crosby (seasons 3–4 and 14) as Sue Ellen's scheming sister Kristin Shepard, who has an affair with J.R. and is revealed to be the one who shot him in the "Who shot J.R.?" storyline;
- Jared Martin (seasons 3–6, 8–9, and 14) as Sue Ellen's cowboy lover and Clayton's adoptive son, Steven "Dusty" Farlow;
- William Smithers (seasons 4–5 and 8–12) as Jeremy Wendell, villainous WestStar Oil frontman who tries to conquer Ewing Oil;
- Leigh McCloskey (seasons 4–5, 8 and 12) as medical student Mitch Cooper, Lucy's on-off husband;
- Audrey Landers (seasons 4–8 and 12–13) as Mitch's sister Afton Cooper, an aspiring singer and Cliff's longtime girlfriend;
- Priscilla Pointer (seasons 4–6) as Rebecca Barnes Wentworth, Pam and Cliff's estranged mother;
- Morgan Brittany (seasons 5–8 and 11) as Rebecca's daughter Katherine Wentworth, Pam and Cliff's psychotic half-sister who falls madly in love with Bobby;
- John Beck (seasons 6–7 and 9) as Mark Graison, Pam's lover and eventual fiancé after her first divorce from Bobby;
- Miss USA winner Deborah Shelton (seasons 8–10) as model Mandy Winger, girlfriend of Cliff Barnes; longtime mistress of J.R.;
- Jenilee Harrison (seasons 8–10) as Jamie Ewing Barnes, Jack's sister who eventually enters into an ill-fated marriage with Cliff Barnes;
- Andrew Stevens (seasons 11–12) as Casey Denault, a young hustler who works for J.R., romancing Lucy and April in order to get to their money:
- Leigh Taylor-Young (seasons 11–12) as Kimberley Cryder, the wife of a WestStar oil executive that J.R. romances to further his business empire;
- Ian McShane (season 12) as Don Lockwood, an English film producer who becomes Sue Ellen's second husband;
- Gayle Hunnicutt (seasons 12–14) as Vanessa Beaumont, mother of James and J.R.'s sweetheart, later temporarily his fiancé.

Longtime child characters include J.R. and Sue Ellen's son John Ross Ewing III (portrayed for seasons 4–6 by Tyler Banks, and for seasons 7–14 by Omri Katz); Bobby and Pam's adopted son Christopher Ewing (portrayed by Eric Farlow for seasons 5–8, and by Joshua Harris for seasons 9–14), and Jenna's daughter Charlotte "Charlie" Wade (Shalane McCall, seasons 7–11, also played by Laurie Lynn Myers for a season 2 episode).

Among the most frequently appearing business associates of the Ewing family are oil cartel members Jordan Lee (Don Starr, seasons 2–14), Marilee Stone (Fern Fitzgerald, seasons 2–13) and Andy Bradley (Paul Sorensen, seasons 2–10); Jock's good friend Marvin "Punk" Anderson (Morgan Woodward, seasons 4–11) and his wife Mavis (Alice Hirson, seasons 6–7 and 10–11); and shady investment banker Vaughn Leland (Dennis Patrick, seasons 3, 5, and 7–8). Other longtime Ewing acquaintances include Dallas PD detective Harry McSween, serving as J.R.'s source within police force (James Brown, seasons 2–12); family attorney Harv Smithfield (George O. Petrie, seasons 3–14); and Donna's stepson, U.S. Senator Dave Culver (Tom Fuccello, seasons 3–6, 8, 10–11, and 13–14).

Also appearing in many episodes are several background characters, including Bobby's secretaries Connie Brasher (portrayed by Donna Bullock in season 1, Ann Ford and Nancy Bleier in season 2, and Jeanna Michaels in seasons 2–4) and Phyllis Wapner (Deborah Tranelli, seasons 4–14); J.R.'s secretaries Louella Caraway Lee (Meg Gallagher, seasons 2–4) and Sly Lovegren (Deborah Rennard, seasons 5–14); Cliff's secretary Jackie Dugan (Sherril Lynn Rettino, seasons 2–5 and 7–14); Ewing Oil receptionist Kendall Chapman (Danone Simpson, seasons 6–14); Southfork maid Teresa (Roseanna Christiansen, seasons 6–14); and Oil Baron's Club staff Dora Mae (Pat Colbert, seasons 7–14), Cassie (Anne C. Lucas, seasons 5–10), and Debbie (Deborah Marie Taylor, seasons 11–14). Widely known supporting actor Tina Louise played J.R.'s secretary, Julie Grey, during the first two seasons before her character was killed off.

=== Main cast departures ===
By the end of the series, only three of the series' original characters (J.R., Bobby, and Cliff) were left in Dallas, the others having either died or left town.

Jock Ewing was the first main character to depart the series, as Jock died offscreen in a mysterious helicopter crash in South America, during season 5. Actor Jim Davis, who played Jock, had died just after production had completed on season 4 in 1981.

Bobby Ewing's death in the season 8 finale, alongside his subsequent absence during the following season, was explained away at the beginning of season 10 as having been dreamed by Pamela, thus erasing everything that had happened during season 9. Patrick Duffy had left the series to pursue other opportunities, but due to declining ratings, he was convinced to return to the series by production company Lorimar as well as by series star Larry Hagman.

Jack Ewing left Dallas to continue his travels and get away from J.R., midway through season 10, and returned a final time for two episodes towards the end of the season. While there has been no official reason as to why actor Dack Rambo was written out of Dallas, Rambo himself later stated that he believed the reasons to be his bisexuality or his conflicts with Larry Hagman, which Rambo said had particularly intensified during his last season on the show (season 10). Before Dallas, Rambo and Hagman had worked together on Sword of Justice in the late 1970s. Hagman later denied any involvement in Rambo's dismissal from Dallas.

Pamela was severely burned after driving a car into an oil tanker, which then exploded into flames, in the season 10 finale in 1987. During season 11, Pam disappeared after her half-sister Katherine was seen around the hospital, with Pam seemingly leaving Bobby and Christopher due to her unwillingness to let them see her in such a physically disfigured fashion. While Victoria Principal never returned to Dallas again after the season 10 finale, Margaret Michaels, a Principal look-alike, played Pam in the opening episode of season 12. Having undergone plastic surgery which explained the difference in her appearance, it was revealed that Pam was dying of a disease, though only she and her doctor knew about this. After this episode, Pam is never seen again. Unable to reach a salary agreement and having a desire to start her own business, it was Principal's own decision not to return to the show after the season 10 finale.

Budget cuts also meant other long term cast members were let go. In addition to Pamela's departure, Ray and Donna divorced at the end of season 10. Donna moving to Washington, D.C., where she later married Senator Andrew Dowling (guest star Jim McMullan), with whom she raised Ray's daughter Margaret. Actress Susan Howard stated in 1987 that the producers had told her that her character had run its course. As season 11 ended, Ray sold his ranch to Carter McKay and left Dallas for Switzerland with Jenna and Lucas, Charlie having already moved there to attend a finishing school. Ray returned for five episodes in the early period of season 12.

Lucy Ewing, who had left with husband Mitch at the end of season 8, returned to Southfork in the final episodes of season 11, only to leave again two years later for Europe. On both occasions, Charlene Tilton's axing was a decision made by the creative team, who had difficulties creating storylines for her.

Sue Ellen left in the season 12 finale, moving to London with her new husband, film director Don Lockwood (guest star Ian McShane). While Linda Gray was let go by the same budget cuts that ended Steve Kanaly's run on the show, Sue Ellen's exit has since been described by Gray as a mutual decision by her and Leonard Katzman, agreeing that the character "had come more than full circle".

Stephanie Rogers was let go as Cliff's PR representative at the end of season 13, making actress Lesley-Anne Down the most short-lived member of the regular cast, appearing in 8 episodes and being on the opening title sequence in 13 episodes.

Barbara Bel Geddes had quadruple heart bypass surgery on March 15, 1983, just days after finishing her last scenes on season 6. Bel Geddes then missed the first 11 episodes of season 7, as she had a period of rest and recuperation following the surgery. After the season 7 finale, Bel Geddes left Dallas entirely after disagreements over her workload and salary in the period following her heart surgery. The role of Miss Ellie was then recast with Donna Reed for season 8, with Reed signing a 3-year contract. Bel Geddes was asked to return for the start of season 9, a request to which Bel Geddes agreed, resulting in a high-profile public relations debacle that left Reed infuriated and in litigation with the series producers, who eventually made Reed a $1 million out-of-court settlement. Reed died unexpectedly of pancreatic cancer a few months later, in January 1986. Miss Ellie remained on the show until near the end of season 13, when she and Clayton left Dallas, deciding to travel around Far East Asia before eventually settling in Europe near Ray and Jenna. Following her exit from Dallas in 1990, Bel Geddes retired from acting.

When the 14th and final season of the series commenced, ten actors received regular cast status. Although half of them left the show prior to the series finale, all of them remained billed in the series' opening sequence throughout the year. Clayton Farlow made four appearances, clearing up business that included deeding Southfork to Bobby; April Stevens Ewing died early on in the season, kidnapped on her honeymoon by Hillary Taylor (guest star Susan Lucci); Cally Harper Ewing left midway through the season to build a new life, with a new boyfriend and her and J.R.'s newborn son; Liz Adams broke her engagement to Cliff and left near the end of the season, and James Beaumont left the show a couple of episodes prior to the series finale, to start a new life on the east coast with his newly discovered toddler son Jimmy, and Jimmy's mother Debra Lynn (guest star Deborah Tucker).

As the series concluded, Carter McKay stayed put at WestStar, as powerful as ever; Michelle Stevens was left heartbroken and humiliated, alone in the ranch she had bought from McKay hoping to live there with James; Cliff Barnes was once and for all the sole owner of Ewing Oil, and Bobby Ewing, now owner of Southfork, was finally able to find closure after April's death. J.R., however, having lost both Ewing Oil and Southfork, as well as being abandoned by his sons, was at the end of his rope; the series ended with the unanswered question whether or not he killed himself.

== Production ==
=== Seasons 1–8 ===
The 1956 film Giant is considered to be the inspiration for Dallas. Both productions focus on the struggle between wealthy oilmen and cattlemen in Texas, in the mid to late 20th century. In addition, both productions have a lead character prominently referred to as "J.R."

Series creator David Jacobs's partner Michael Filerman suggested Dallas as the name for the show. Jacobs knew nothing about the city other than the Kennedy assassination and the Dallas Cowboys; only after visiting the state to prepare for filming did he realize that the show should be called Houston as the petroleum industry is much more important there, while Dallas has banking and insurance. He wrote the first and the final episode of the original five-part miniseries (season 1), with the other three episodes being written by Arthur Bernard Lewis, Camille Marchetta and Virginia Aldrige. While Aldrige did not return to the series again and Marchetta left during season 4, Lewis grew to be one of Dallas's most influential writers.

Leonard Katzman had been a part of season 1 as producer, and during season 2 his influence increased, as he began writing and directing episodes. Series creator David Jacobs left his day-to-day duties as executive story consultant at the end of season 2, in order to focus on the production of spin-off Knots Landing. The executive producers of Dallas in the first 3 seasons were Philip Capice and Lee Rich. During the first 8 seasons of the show, Dallas's production team remained basically intact (the main exception being Rich's leaving after season 3). After Lee Rich's departure, Philip Capice served as the sole executive producer, Leonard Katzman as producer and showrunner, Cliff Fenneman as associate producer, and Arthur Bernard Lewis as executive story editor/supervising producer. And, although 25 writers contributed with scripts, the trio of Katzman, Lewis and David Paulsen wrote nearly two-thirds of the episodes during these first eight seasons. Paulsen had joined the show during the season 4 and was promoted to story editor for season 6. The trio wrote every episode but two during seasons 7 and 8.

=== Season 9 ===
Creative conflicts between executive producer Philip Capice and producer Leonard Katzman led to Katzman leaving the show at the end of season 8. Although Katzman was to continue writing for the show during season 9 and also acted during this season as "creative consultant" (which meant he was sent copies of all scripts and asked to give his input), Capice decided to bring in a new production team: joining him and associate producer Cliff Fenneman were James H. Brown as producer and Peter Dunne as supervising producer/showrunner, executive story consultant Joel J. Feigenbaum, and story editors Hollace White and Stephanie Garman.

However, increased production costs and the claim of decreased ratings (though the accuracy of this has been disputed) caused production company Lorimar to persuade both Patrick Duffy and Leonard Katzman to return. As season 9 came to a close, Katzman was on board to return as showrunner for the following season and the season finale saw Patrick Duffy inexplicably resurface on screen.

=== Season 10 ===
As of the season 10 premiere, there was another major overhaul of the crew, with Leonard Katzman not only returning to the production side of the show but also getting promoted to executive producer, reportedly on the condition that he would get "total authority" of the show, while Philip Capice and most of the season 9 staff left the production. Alongside Katzman, David Paulsen was brought back as the show's new producer, while the position as supervising producer was offered to newcomer Calvin Clements Jr. and Cliff Fenneman remained associate producer. A new writing staff was hired to work alongside the producers, including Katzman's son Mitchell Wayne Katzman as story editor and Leah Markus as story consultant. Markus left after two years, while the others remained until the show's end.

Scriptwise, Patrick Duffy's return was explained by having the entire season 9 being a dream of Victoria Principal's character Pam, effectively sweeping away the events occurring during the period in which Katzman's involvement with the show had been minimized.

Even the cast were affected by the production and political struggles. While Larry Hagman (J.R.) reportedly supported Katzman, and had played a great part in bringing Duffy back, Susan Howard (Donna), who also had written the script for one of the season 9 episodes, had sided with Philip Capice, and was opposed to the idea of annulling the events of season 9. While she returned to write another episode for season 10, she left the show, both as a writer and as a cast member, at the end of the season.

=== Seasons 11–14 ===
During the final four years of the show, Leonard Katzman remained showrunner, with series star Larry Hagman joining him as executive producer (beginning with season 12) and Ken Horton as co-executive producer (as of season 13).

Supervising producer Calvin Clements Jr. left the show after season 10, and was replaced for seasons 11 and 12 by the returning Arthur Bernard Lewis, who remained a writer on the show until its end. Lewis was thus reuniting with Leonard Katzman and David Paulsen. However, Paulsen left Dallas at the end of the 11th season (to join rival soap Dynasty), and was replaced as the show's producer first by Howard Lakin for season 12, and then by longtime associate producer Cliff Fenneman for the final two years. Lakin spent seasons 13 and 14 as supervising producer.

Mitchell Wayne Katzman was promoted to co-producer as of season 12, while Frank Katzman (the other son of Leonard Katzman) and John Rettino (Leonard Katzman's son-in-law), served as associate producers during seasons 13 and 14. Additionally, Katzman's PA Louella Lee Caraway was credited as executive coordinator for the final three seasons. The final major addition to the staff was Lisa Seidman, who joined the show as executive story consultant for the final two seasons.

=== Filming locations ===
The pilot season was shot entirely on location in Dallas, Texas, and at the Cloyce Box Ranch in Frisco, Texas. Later, most interiors for the show were shot at the MGM Studios in Culver City, California (which was purchased outright by Lorimar in 1986), with some exteriors being shot at the Southfork Ranch in Parker, Texas, and other sections of Dallas. For season 13, rising production costs led to all filming being relocated to California. Typically the cast and crew would spend six to eight weeks filming on-location sequences in the Dallas area during the summer prior to the season, then film the remainder of the season in the Los Angeles area; fewer than half of the episodes in a given season had on-location sequences filmed in Dallas. MGM built a full-size replica of the Southfork Ranch backyard and pool on one of its soundstages, allowing for filming of "location" shots during the latter part of the season.

=== Directors ===
Leonard Katzman is the most prominent director on the show, having directed episodes of every season except seasons 1, 9 and 12. Next to Katzman, Michael Preece, is responsible for having directed the most Dallas episodes, having joined the show during season 4 and remaining until the end. Of the two directors attached to the original miniseries, Robert Day did not return for subsequent seasons, while Irving J. Moore remained on the show until season 5, and then returned for the final three.

Five of the series' stars also directed episodes: Larry Hagman (seasons 3–14), Patrick Duffy (seasons 4–8 and 10–14), Linda Gray (seasons 9–12), Steve Kanaly (seasons 10–12) and Ken Kercheval (seasons 13–14).

== Episodes ==
Season	Episodes	Originally released		Rank	Viewers (in ratings points)
Season	Episodes	First released	Last released	Rank	Viewers (in ratings points)
1	5	April 2, 1978	April 30, 1978	42	19.0
2	24	September 23, 1978	April 6, 1979	40	18.4
3	25	September 21, 1979	March 21, 1980	5	20.0
4	23	November 7, 1980	May 1, 1981	1	27.6
5	26	October 9, 1981	April 9, 1982	1	23.2
6	28	October 1, 1982	May 6, 1983	2	20.5
7	30	September 30, 1983	May 18, 1984	1	21.5
8	30	September 28, 1984	May 17, 1985	2	20.97
9	31	September 27, 1985	May 16, 1986	6	18.8
10	29	September 26, 1986	May 15, 1987	11	18.6
11	30	September 25, 1987	May 13, 1988	21	15.2
12	26	October 28, 1988	May 19, 1989	30	13.9
13	27	September 22, 1989	May 11, 1990	43	—N/a
14	23	November 2, 1990	May 3, 1991	61	—N/a

== Ratings ==
Dallas originally aired on Saturday nights when it debuted as a regular series. Within a month, the show was moved to Sunday nights, where it stayed until halfway through the season, when it took a Friday-night slot. Dallas remained on Fridays until the show ended in 1991, alternating between 9 p.m. and 10 p.m. airings.

The "Who Done It" episode of Dallas that revealed who shot J.R.?, the famous 1980 cliffhanger, received the highest domestic ratings at that point with over 90 million American viewers (representing more than 53% of the U.S. households and 76% of the American television audience for November 21, 1980) tuning in for the answer. The episode surpassed the ratings record of the final episode of The Fugitive, broadcast in August 1967, but the record of Dallas was broken only by the last episode of M*A*S*H in 1983, falling into the second internationally most watched American television episode, with nearly 360 million viewers in over 57 countries worldwide (by the year 1980) tuning in to see who shot J.R.

Although the soap's audience had consistently declined since the "Who Done It" episode of 1980, the series finale of Dallas, "Conundrum", garnered 33 million viewers and a 22 household rating from 9 to 11 pm on May 3, 1991, becoming the country's 14th most watched television series finale. Its competition, Manhunter (on NBC), only drew a 9.8 rating.

=== Films/specials ===
Date / title / network / household rating / share / viewers / time

- November 15, 1996 / Dallas: J.R. Returns / CBS / 13.4 / 23 / 18.1 / 9–11 pm (lead-in The Lion's Pride drew a 6.3 rating)
- April 24, 1998 / Dallas: War of the Ewings / CBS / 7.8 / 14 (lead-in Candid Camera drew a 6.8 rating)
- November 7, 2004 / Dallas Reunion: The Return to Southfork / CBS / 8.5 / 14 / 12.7 / 9:30–11:30 pm

=== Broadcast history ===
==== CBS ====
- April 2–30, 1978: Sundays, 10:00 pm (ET/PT)/9:00 pm (CT/MT)
- September 23 – October 14, 1978: Saturdays, 10:00/9:00 pm
- October 15, 1978 – January 14, 1979: Sundays, 10:00/9:00 pm
- January 26, 1979 – November 27, 1981: Fridays, 10:00/9:00 pm
- December 4, 1981 – March 16, 1990: Fridays, 9:00/8:00 pm
- March 30 – December 21, 1990: Fridays, 10:00/9:00 pm
- January 4 – May 3, 1991: Fridays, 9:00/8:00 pm

==== Syndication ====
Beginning in fall 1984, Dallas was packaged for off-network syndication by Lorimar to local stations; among the stations to purchase the program initially was the Dallas-Fort Worth ABC affiliate, WFAA-TV. Only the first 222 episodes (seasons 1 through 9) were part of the syndication package. However, Dallas did not achieve the same type of rating success in local markets as it did during its CBS primetime run.

During the 1990s, the show aired briefly on TNT (from September 1992 to August 1993, again the first nine seasons only), followed by a run on TNN beginning in the fall of 1996 (the first network to air all 357 episodes of the original series, but the episodes were heavily edited for time), and from 2003 to 2008 the entire run aired on the soap opera-themed cable network SoapNet, uncut and unedited, as it was originally broadcast. On January 1, 2011, CMT aired the show for one day, and prior to the premiere of the 2012 sequel, select episodes were shown on CMT and its website.

In 1981, Mediaset, Silvio Berlusconi's Italian media conglomerate, translated and serialized Dallas on Italian primetime, where it became popular throughout Italy. The series aired in Japan on TV Asahi, but as of early 1982, its ratings were low and the series moved to a later timeslot (11pm on Thursdays, previously at 10pm).

==== Broadcasts in the United Kingdom ====
In the UK, the rights to show Dallas had been bought by the BBC and it quickly became a ratings winner, drawing audiences of over 20 million. However, in 1985 the corporation refused to pay the $60,000 per-episode asking price for the ninth series. Whilst negotiating with the distributor to acquire the next season, their commercial rival, the ITV franchise holder Thames Television unexpectedly stepped in and met the price. The BBC reacted angrily to this development, pulling the current series mid-run, and threatening to broadcast the remaining episodes simultaneously with Thames Television's intended scheduling in November of that year. It caused a furore in the press and a question on the matter was even asked in Parliament. The BBC relented, and re-commenced their broadcasts of the current series on 27 March.

Ultimately, numerous other ITV franchises, in particular Granada Television and Yorkshire Television, were not happy with the deal and thus complained to the regulatory Independent Broadcasting Authority. After a few months pressure from the IBA and other ITV franchise holders, Thames Television backed down on their plans and sold season nine back to the BBC, at a loss. It took until January 1986 for the matter to be resolved. Dallas continued to be broadcast on BBC1 until the end of the series' run in 1991.

== Cliffhangers ==
Dallas is notable for its cliffhangers. Throughout the series' run, every season ended with some sort of cliffhanging ending designed to drive ratings up for the season premiere later in the year.

- Miniseries cliffhanger: Although this really was not a cliffhanger, the end of the fifth episode of the original Dallas miniseries saw J.R. (Larry Hagman) go up to the loft of the barn to talk to Pam (Victoria Principal), who had gone up there to find her cousin Jimmy (James Canning), after Digger (David Wayne) had fallen off the wagon at the Ewing barbecue. J.R., intoxicated, tries to convince her to tell Bobby (Patrick Duffy) not to leave the ranch. However, she does not want to be bothered, and, in trying to escape J.R., she falls from the loft, landing square on her stomach. Pam, who is pregnant, miscarries her unborn child. Later, Sue Ellen (Linda Gray) questions J.R. as to whether it was really an accident or did he push her. J.R. says, "I did not." When Sue Ellen asks J.R. if he cares that Pam lost the baby, J.R. does not answer her, leaving it up to the viewer to decide.
- Season 2 cliffhanger: Sue Ellen's drinking problem has landed her in a sanitarium, where she is pregnant with a child she believes is Cliff's (Ken Kercheval). She escapes from the sanitarium, gets drunk, and then gets into a severe car accident, putting her life and the baby's life in danger. The doctors deliver the baby, named John Ross Ewing III, but he is very small on delivery and is not out of the woods yet; nor is Sue Ellen, who, as the episode ends, is clinging to life. A distraught J.R. is watching his wife at the end of the episode in tears, saying that she has "just gotta live".
- Season 3 cliffhanger: J.R. has made so many people in Texas hate him with a passion: men he has cheated in business, women he has cheated in relationships, family members he has angered, and a Marilee Stone (Fern Fitzgerald), whose husband committed suicide after a particularly disastrous business deal. After all this, somebody waits outside J.R.'s Ewing Oil office late at night, and when J.R. hears a noise, asks who it is and walks to the door, somebody shoots him twice in the abdomen. The cliffhanger to this episode leads to the now-famous "Who shot J.R.?" debates and speculation, and also speculation as to whether J.R. would actually survive the shooting or be killed off.
- Season 4 cliffhanger: Sue Ellen tries to sneak her son John Ross off Southfork, but is caught by J.R., who banishes her from the ranch. Pam later intercedes, taking John Ross to his mother while J.R. is away—throwing J.R. into a rage. Kristin (Mary Crosby) returns demanding more money from J.R., who tells her it is not too late to prosecute her for shooting him. While heading to a late-night business meeting with Bobby, Cliff finds a brunette woman's body floating in the Southfork pool. He jumps into the pool to see who it is, and when he looks back up, J.R. is standing on the balcony over the pool. Believing J.R. is responsible, Cliff says to his rival, "She's dead. You bastard." The face of the body was not shown, leading to speculation over whether it was Sue Ellen, Pam, Kristin or someone else. This was the show's highest-rated season-ending episode.
- Season 5 cliffhanger: Earlier in the season, Cliff had J.R. facing a financial mess, when J.R.'s plan to blackmail the Farlows into handing over John Ross, by stockpiling 5 million barrels of the Farlows' crude oil, backfired on J.R., when the market price of crude oil started to plummet. In order to stockpile the Farlows' crude oil, J.R. had taken out a $200,000,000 loan and used $50,000,000 worth of Ewing Oil assets as collateral. Cliff, along with Jordan Lee (Don Starr), Andy Bradley (Paul Sorensen) and Wade Luce (Robert Ackerman), then worked with Vaughn Leland (Dennis Patrick) in order to buy into the notes owed by J.R., and they planned to foreclose. With Cliff seemingly putting one over on J.R., Miss Ellie (Barbara Bel Geddes) bailed Ewing Oil out of this mess by agreeing to a deal with Clayton (Howard Keel) that Clayton would pay the price that he would have paid at the time that the oil was stockpiled. By the season's end, J.R. and Cliff's situations had turned sharply in the opposite direction, as Sue Ellen, with whom Cliff had had an off-and-on relationship, decided to return to J.R., planning to marry him again. In addition, J.R. had set a trap for Cliff by making sure that a fake geological report would convince Cliff to invest millions of dollars in buying property on supposedly oil rich land which was actually bone dry. Cliff was then fired by his mother Rebecca Barnes Wentworth (Priscilla Pointer) from running Wentworth Tool & Die, due to Cliff's embezzlement of company funds. Cliff attempts suicide with an overdose of pills, and a guilt-ridden Sue Ellen rushes to his bedside as Cliff lies in a coma. J.R. tries to convince Sue Ellen that it was not anybody's fault but Cliff's for what happened, but Sue Ellen disagrees and says she does not know if she can remarry J.R. if Cliff dies. Cliff's life hangs in the balance as the season ends.
- Season 6 cliffhanger: Earlier in the season, Sue Ellen gets drunk after having seen J.R. in bed with Holly Harwood (Lois Chiles). She gets into a car and Ray Krebbs' (Steve Kanaly) cousin Mickey Trotter (Timothy Patrick Murphy) tries to stop her and they are involved in an accident, in a car belonging to J.R., just outside Southfork. Sue Ellen emerges with nothing worse than bruises, but Mickey is paralyzed from the neck down and in a coma. In the final episode of the season, Ray finds out that the driver of the other car was Walt Driscoll (Ben Piazza), who helped J.R. in a previous scheme. He also learns that Driscoll deliberately caused the accident, thinking that J.R. was driving, as a means of revenge for being put in jail by J.R. earlier in the year. An angered Ray comes to Southfork late at night demanding answers from J.R., who was not expecting to see him. J.R. asks him what is going on and Ray says he is going to kill J.R. for what happened. J.R. throws a candle holder at Ray, which misses him and knocks over another candle holder with lit candles in it. As the two brawl, the candles ignite a fire and the smoke starts to creep into both John Ross and Sue Ellen's bedrooms as they sleep. Sue Ellen had been given a sedative by the doctor earlier in the day so she does not wake up. J.R. notices the fire and tries to break free of Ray, finally knocking him out with a telephone, and runs upstairs to try to save his wife and son. Ray recovers and runs after J.R. but is consumed by smoke and falls. J.R. is hit with a falling beam as he gets upstairs and both men are unconscious as Southfork burns.
- Season 7 cliffhanger: Reminiscent of the season three cliffhanger, a mysterious figure enters the Ewing Oil building late one night. Proceeding to J.R.'s office, the figure produces a gun and fires three shots into the back of J.R.'s chair in which somebody is sitting. As the victim falls out of the chair and to the ground, we see it is Bobby Ewing that has been shot.
- Season 8 cliffhanger: Bobby, who has been divorced from Pam for over a year and is now engaged to Jenna Wade (Priscilla Beaulieu Presley), decides that he wants to remarry his ex-wife instead, and Pam agrees. The next morning, as Bobby is leaving Pam's house, someone drives a car at high speed toward Pam. Bobby shoves her out of the way just before she is hit but cannot get out of the way of the car in time to save himself. We see that it is Katherine (Morgan Brittany) who was driving the car, and that she was also killed when her car crashed after running over Bobby. Bobby is rushed to the hospital, where he later dies, with Pam, Jenna, J.R., Miss Ellie, Clayton, Ray and Donna (Susan Howard) at his bedside.
- Season 9 cliffhanger: Evil businesswoman Angelica Nero (Barbara Carrera) intends to kill J.R. and his cousin Jack (Dack Rambo) for double crossing her, but J.R. has her apprehended by the police. Unfortunately, Angelica has already had a bomb attached to Jack's car, which explodes with Jamie (Jenilee Harrison) inside. After hearing this on the phone, J.R. runs out of his office to go to Jack's apartment. As he leaves the office, Sue Ellen arrives in the other elevator looking for him. As soon as she enters J.R.'s office, another bomb left by Angelica goes off, and the entire floor that houses Ewing Oil explodes, showering debris onto the street below. The scene then shifts to Pam in bed, the day after her marriage to Mark Graison (John Beck). Pam wakes up to hear the shower running. Assuming it is Mark, she opens the shower door, only to find Bobby Ewing, alive and well. (In the Season Ten premiere, Bobby's death and all of Season Nine was revealed as a dream of Pam's).
- Season 10 cliffhanger: The Ewings suffer a devastating loss as Ewing Oil is closed down by the US Justice Department as punishment for J.R.'s shady dealings which caused an international incident. Pam, on her way home to Bobby from the doctor's office after finding out she can finally conceive a baby, crashes into a fuel tanker, which then explodes.
- Season 11 cliffhanger: J.R. and Nicholas Pearce (Jack Scalia), Sue Ellen's new boyfriend, fight in J.R.'s penthouse hotel suite. The fight ends up with both of them on the balcony, and Pearce falls over the balcony to his death. Shocked by what she has just seen, Sue Ellen then picks up a gun from the floor and shoots J.R. three times. She then picks up the phone and tells the police she would like to report a double murder.
- Season 12 cliffhanger: Sue Ellen prepares to leave Dallas for good, but with a final surprise for J.R.: with the help of her new boyfriend Don Lockwood (Ian McShane), Sue Ellen has made a biographical motion picture about her marriages to J.R. (with actors portraying them and the other Ewings) and previews the film to him, leaving him shocked and horrified. Sue Ellen tells J.R. that she is leaving Dallas, but if he ever crosses her again in the future – or even if she wakes up on the wrong side of bed one morning – she will release the film and J.R. will be made "the laughing stock of Texas", before finally and triumphantly leaving.
- Season 13 cliffhanger: After deliberately committing himself into a sanitarium in order to persuade Clayton's sister, Jessica Montford (Alexis Smith), to sign over her voting majority in WestStar Oil, J.R.'s plan backfires when Cally (Cathy Podewell) and James (Sasha Mitchell) coerce him into signing a property waiver before they will allow him to be released. Once he does, James tears up J.R.'s release papers anyway leaving him trapped in the sanitarium with no means of escape.
- Season 14 cliffhanger: After finally losing Ewing Oil to Cliff Barnes, control of Southfork to Bobby, and being abandoned by his wife and children, a drunk and despondent J.R. begins walking around the ranch alone with a loaded gun wishing he had never been born. A gunshot is later fired in J.R.'s bedroom as Bobby returns to Southfork, and he rushes up to J.R.'s room and gasps, saying "Oh, my God!" as the series ends.

== Spin-offs, sequels and adaptations ==
=== Knots Landing ===
Prior to the premiere of Dallas, Jacobs originated the idea for a drama series about four married couples in different stages of marriage, inspired by Ingmar Bergman's Scenes from a Marriage. However, CBS wanted a "saga-like" show, resulting in Jacobs creating Dallas. When the series proved to be a hit, CBS reconsidered Jacobs's original idea, which evolved into Dallas spin-off series Knots Landing, premiering in late 1979.

Knots Landing followed the lives of Lucy's parents, Gary (Ted Shackelford) and Valene (Joan Van Ark), as they move to California to start a new life following the start of their second marriage in 1979. During the early seasons of Knots Landing, several Dallas actors (Larry Hagman, Patrick Duffy, Charlene Tilton, and Mary Crosby) made guest appearances in the new series, and Shackelford and Van Ark continued to make occasional appearances in Dallas. In addition to this, some storylines crossed over, such as the reading of Jock Ewing's will, with events having an impact on characters in both shows.

The ongoing bond between the two series was eventually cut in 1986, as the tenth-season premiere of Dallas declared Bobby's death the previous year had been a dream. Bobby's death had had some influence on the Knots Landing storylines as well, with Gary grieving for his dead brother while Gary's wife Abby (Donna Mills), who had lost her brother Sid (Don Murray) a few years earlier, consoled him. Abby and Greg Sumner (William Devane) then took advantage of Gary's grief and Gary's journey to Dallas for Bobby's funeral to gain politically at Empire Valley. Val also named her and Gary's son "Bobby" in memory of his late uncle. Unlike the Dallas producers, the Knots Landing producers were not prepared or willing to reset their series, resulting in the producers cutting ties between the two shows. As a result, there were no further crossover episodes or storylines; Bobby's return was never addressed on Knots Landing, nor was he mentioned again (on Dallas, however, mentions of Gary increased, and archive footage of Joan Van Ark appeared in Season 12). However, Shackelford and Van Ark did reprise their roles for the Dallas series finale "Conundrum" in 1991, which showed what would have happened to their characters if J.R. had never existed.

=== Films and reunions ===
A prequel story, Dallas: The Early Years, was a made-for-TV movie that first aired on March 23, 1986, on CBS during season 9 of the TV series. The film starred David Grant as Digger Barnes, Dale Midkiff as Jock Ewing, Molly Hagan as Miss Ellie Southworth Ewing, David Wilson as Jason Ewing, and Hoyt Axton as Aaron Southworth, and was introduced by Larry Hagman in the role of J.R. Ewing. Detailing the origins of the Barnes-Ewing feud and the creation of Ewing Oil, and covering a timespan from 1933 to 1951, the film was written by series creator David Jacobs.

There were also two made-for-TV reunion movies that aired on CBS several years after the series ended: Dallas: J.R. Returns (1996), which resolved the series finale cliffhanger; and the 20th anniversary movie Dallas: War of the Ewings (1998). Alongside returning series stars (Patrick Duffy, Larry Hagman, Linda Gray, George Kennedy, Ken Kercheval and Steve Kanaly), and recurring cast (Omri Katz, Audrey Landers, Deborah Rennard and George O. Petrie), the two telefilms also introduced new characters – including up-and-coming lawyer Anita Smithfield, played by Tracy Scoggins. The younger characters Christopher Ewing, and Cliff and Afton's daughter Pamela Rebecca were recast with Chris Demetral and Deborah Kellner taking on the roles.

In November 2003, SOAPnet aired a Dallas reunion on Soap Talk to coincide with SOAPnet acquiring the rights to rerun Dallas episodes. Larry Hagman, Patrick Duffy, Linda Gray and Charlene Tilton all participated in the reunion, which included clips of past episodes. The SOAPnet Dallas reunion was included in the special features of Dallas seasons 1 & 2 DVD set.

On November 7, 2004, CBS aired a primetime TV special titled Dallas Reunion: The Return to Southfork, in which the stars reminisced about their work on the series (by coincidence, actor Howard Keel, who played Clayton Farlow, had died earlier that same day).

On November 8, 2008, a Dallas 30th anniversary reunion was held at Southfork Ranch in Parker, Texas, with original cast members Larry Hagman, Patrick Duffy, Linda Gray, Ken Kercheval, Steve Kanaly and Charlene Tilton; other cast members in attendance were Susan Howard, Audrey Landers, Mary Crosby and Sheree J. Wilson. The front and back lawn of the fictional Ewing family home played host to a massive barbecue filled with people from the Dallas area, across the U.S. and around the world (who paid as much as $1,000) to reminisce and celebrate the series, as well as meeting with cast members. During the festivities, Kercheval said he was shocked to see the continued support for the show 17 years after it last aired: "I don't understand it. The staying power. Who knew?" Linda Gray also fondly remembered her time on the show: "I think it was a special time. It was a time when there weren't a hundred million channels and the Internet and all of the other things that came to existence."

A Dallas Retrospective: J.R. Ewing Bourbon Presents Linda Gray and Patrick Duffy one-night only event was held on March 23, 2017, at the AT&T Performing Arts Center's Winspear Opera House in Dallas, during which both Duffy and Gray reminisced about their careers and their time on Dallas. It was sponsored by the nationally distributed J.R. Ewing Bourbon and moderated by The Dallas Morning News columnist Robert Wilonsky.

On March 30–31, 2018, a 40th anniversary reunion was held at Southfork Ranch in Parker and the Longhorn Ballroom in Dallas, with cast members Patrick Duffy, Linda Gray, Charlene Tilton and Steve Kanaly attending the festivities. The celebrations included Southfork tours, a meet-and-greet with the cast, an array of Dallas memorabilia at the "Dallas Legends" exhibit and closing out with a party at the historic Longhorn Ballroom.

In honor of the show's 45th anniversary, another reunion was held on June 13, 2023, at Oscar's in Palm Springs, California which was attended by Patrick Duffy, Linda Gray, Steve Kanaly, Charlene Tilton, Audrey Landers and Joan Van Ark. The cast talked about the Dallas years as well as their personal lives and careers since with CBS moderator Sandie Newton.

=== Revival series ===
In 2010, cable network TNT announced they had ordered a pilot for the continuation of the Dallas series. After viewing the completed pilot episode, TNT proceeded to order a full season of 10 episodes.

The new series, which premiered on June 13, 2012, focused primarily on John Ross and Christopher Ewing, the now-grown sons of J.R. and Bobby. Larry Hagman, Patrick Duffy and Linda Gray returned in full-time capacity, reprising their original roles. The series was produced by Warner Horizon Television, a subsidiary of Warner Bros., which holds the rights to the Dallas franchise through its acquisition of Lorimar Television and is a sister company to TNT, both under the ownership of Time Warner.

The new series is a continuation of the old series, with the story continuing after a 20-year break. It does not take the events of the 1990s TV movies Dallas: J.R. Returns or Dallas: War of the Ewings as canon. Instead we find the characters 20 years after the events of the Season 14 cliffhanger. In an interview with UltimateDallas.com, writer/producer Cynthia Cidre was asked to describe the new Dallas. She responded, "I tried to be really, really respectful of the original Dallas because it was really clear to me that the people who love Dallas are [like] Trekkies, really committed to that show and I really did not understand that before, so I never wanted to violate anything that had happened in the past. On the other hand that was the past, twenty years had gone by, so at the same time I think we're properly balanced between the characters of Bobby Ewing, J.R. and Sue Ellen. I also have the new cast and it's John Ross and Christopher, the children of Bobby and J.R., and their love interests. Total respect and a balance of old and new."

In the show's second season, J.R. Ewing was killed off (following the death of actor Larry Hagman in November 2012), sparking another "who-done-it" storyline throughout the remainder of the season. Various cast members from the original series attended his onscreen funeral.

Despite initially strong numbers, ratings for the new Dallas declined over the three seasons that the show ran before TNT cancelled it in 2014.

=== Books and other media ===
During the series' heyday, several magazines, books and merchandise were produced:

- In 1980, a novel titled Dallas based on the original five-episode miniseries written by Lee Raintree was published by Dell Publishing.
- In 1980–81, another three novels adapting the subsequent seasons – The Ewings of Dallas, The Men of Dallas and The Women of Dallas – were all written by Burt Hirschfeld and published by Bantam Books.
- In 1980, The Dallas Family Album written by Robert Masello was published by Bantam Books.
- In 1980, The Southworth Connection was an unofficial magazine story by Phoenix Publications detailing Brannigan Southworth's attempt to shoot J.R. Ewing.
- In 1980, Dallas: The Television Role-Playing Game was released by Simulations Publications, Inc. (SPI).
- In 1981–84, the Los Angeles Times Syndicate produced a Dallas comic strip for newspapers, written by Jim Lawrence and illustrated by Ron Harris, Thomas Warkentin, Padraic Shigetani, Deryl Skelton, and others.
- In 1984, Datasoft released the video game The Dallas Quest for the Tandy Color Computer and Commodore 64.
- In 1985, Who Killed Jock Ewing? by Robert Tine was published by Arrow as part of a major whodunnit competition that saw J.R., Bobby and Ray investigating their father's death.
- In 1985, Dallas: The Complete Ewing Family Saga by Laura Van Wormer was published by Doubleday.
- In 1986, The Complete Book of Dallas: Behind the Scenes at the World's Favorite Television Show by Suzy Kalter was published by Harry N. Abrams.
- In 1986–87, further Dallas novels were published by Pioneer Communications Network. There were 14 titles in the Soaps & Serials series: Love Conquers Fear, Ardent Memories, Love's Challenge, The Power of Passion, Dangerous Desire, Double Dealing, Hostage Heart, This Cherished Land, Power Play, Winner Take All, Reality Strikes, Shattered Dreams, A Cry in the Night and Family Secrets.
- In 2004, 25 Years of Dallas: The Complete Story of the World's Favorite Prime-Time Soap written by Barbara A. Curran was published by Cumberland House Publishing. It contains synopses for each season, extensive research into production and interviews with most of original cast, along with a foreword by Victoria Principal and an introduction by David Jacobs.

== Legacy ==
=== Dallas and the Cold War ===
Dallas is alleged to have helped partially hasten the downfall of the communist regime in the Eastern Bloc country of Romania during the final years of the Cold War. Romanian President Nicolae Ceaușescu allowed airings of Dallas, one of the few Western shows allowed to be aired in the Communist state during the 1980s. The belief that the show would be seen as anti-capitalistic backfired on the regime as Romanian citizens desired and sought the luxurious lifestyle of the American elite seen in the show, compared to the despotic situation in Romania at the time. Shortly after the execution of Ceaușescu and his wife on Christmas Day 1989, the pilot episode of Dallas, which had been edited for a sex scene, was one of the first Western Shows aired on the newly liberated Romanian TV. The popularity of Dallas in Romania is the subject of the 2016 experimental documentary Hotel Dallas, directed by artist duo Ungur & Huang and starring Patrick Duffy, who plays a surreal double of the Bobby Ewing character.

Also in northern parts of Soviet-occupied Estonia, Dallas became popular when shown on Finnish television, being watched illegally on modified Soviet television sets. In the communist Soviet Union thousands of people drove regularly to the northern tip of Estonia to pick up the series on Finnish TV. This was described in the 2009 documentary Disco and Atomic War.

=== Other ===
In 2007, British comedian Justin Lee Collins went searching for all the stars of Dallas to bring them together for a reunion party. The show was broadcast on May 27, 2007, on British television network Channel 4 as part of the Bring Back... series. Amongst the cast, the participants were Larry Hagman, Linda Gray, Patrick Duffy, Ken Kercheval, Charlene Tilton, Susan Howard and Mary Crosby.

In March 2011, the Texas Theatre in Dallas began showing two episodes of Dallas on the big screen every Sunday; over 100 patrons, some in costume of their favorite characters, appeared at the free screenings every week. However, the screenings came to an abrupt end in May 2011 after Warner Bros. issued a cease-and-desist against the Texas Theatre for unauthorized showings, citing the fact that those that were involved in the show's production were not getting paid or benefiting from these screenings.

J.R. Ewing's hat, a foremost symbol of the show's inherent "Americanness" that contributed to its hold over audiences on a global scale, is currently held in the Smithsonian's National Museum of American History's collections.

The series is mentioned in the lyrics of Swedish pop band ABBA's 1982 single "The Day Before You Came": "There's not, I think, a single episode of Dallas that I didn't see."

Country singer Hank Williams Jr. had a hit with a song called "This Ain't Dallas" comparing his and his wife's life together with that of J.R. and Sue Ellen.

The show's "Who shot J.R.?" storyline has been used in other drama series, including the BBC's EastEnders with the "Who Shot Phil?" Mitchell storyline, and more recently with the "Who Killed Lucy Beale?" storyline.

In 1995, the animated series The Simpsons also had a "Who Shot Mr. Burns?" storyline.

In 2013, TV Guide ranked Dallas at No. 47 on its list of the 60 Best Series of all time.

Prior to Dallas, both Patrick Duffy and Larry Hagman worked in the 1974 made-for-TV film Hurricane although they never appeared in the same scenes.

An episode of the British satirical series "Spitting Image" showed a sketch entitled "Pallas" which parodied members of the Royal Family as if they were characters from Dallas.
