= Cloyce Box Ranch =

Ranch in Frisco, Texas, US

Coordinates: 33.155581°N 96.790569°W

Cloyce Box Ranch house as seen on the TV series Dallas

The Cloyce Box Ranch was the site of the original Southfork ranch location, where the initial five episodes of Dallas were filmed. The series left the location at the end of the first season in 1978 at the request of property owner, Cloyce K. Box, who was unhappy with the negative portrayal of the Texas oil industry by the show. The ranch currently is a tourist attraction based on that use. The production moved to the ranch "Duncan Acres", near Plano, Texas, where the series was filmed for the rest of its run.

The ranch house, a 14,000-square-foot (1,300 m^{2}) colonial-style mansion designed by John Astin Perkins and originally built in 1941 as a replica of Tara, the fictional plantation house in the 1939 film Gone With The Wind, no longer exists, having been destroyed by a fire in 1987. The frame of the original Southfork Ranch that was used in the pilot season still stands in Frisco, Texas, on the northeast corner of Preston Rd. and Main St.
