= Shalane McCall =

American actress and model (born 1972)

- Born: September 16, 1972 (age 54); North Hollywood, California, U.S.
- Occupations: Retired actress and model
- Years active: 1980–1988
- Spouse: Trent Valladares (m. 1989)

Shalane McCall (born September 16, 1972) is a former American actress, best known for appearing for five seasons (1983–1988) on the hit primetime soap opera Dallas playing Charlotte "Charlie" Wade, the daughter of Jenna Wade (Priscilla Presley).

== Career ==
Shalane McCall was born and raised in North Hollywood, California, the daughter of Clark McCall and Cherie Holton. She began modeling and appearing in commercials at the age of 9. In 1982, McCall made her acting debut in small role on an episode of Silver Spoons. The following year, she was cast to play Jenna Wade's daughter on Dallas, a role she continued for five seasons. McCall, along with her childhood friend Kelly Hyman, was nominated for a Youth in Film Award.

Her final acting role to date was a guest spot in an April 1988 episode of The New Leave It to Beaver.

In October 1989, at age 17, McCall married musician Trent Valladares, of the band Clyde.
