= Leonard Katzman =

American producer, writer and director

- Born: September 2, 1927; New York City, U.S.
- Died: September 5, 1996 (aged 69); Malibu, California, U.S.
- Resting place: Mount Sinai Memorial Park Cemetery
- Occupations: Producer; screenwriter; director
- Years active: 1940s–1996
- Known for: Showrunner of Dallas
- Spouse: LaRue Farlow
- Children: 4
- Relatives: Ethan Klein (biological grandson)

Leonard Katzman (September 2, 1927 – September 5, 1996) was an American film and television producer, writer, and director. He was most notable for being the showrunner of the CBS prime time oil soap opera Dallas.

== Early life and career ==
Leonard Katzman on September 2, 1927, was born to a Jewish family in New York City. He began his career in the 1940s, while still in his teens, working as an assistant director for his uncle, Hollywood producer Sam Katzman. He started on adventure movie serials such as Brenda Starr, Reporter (1945), Superman (1948), Batman and Robin (1949), The Great Adventures of Captain Kidd (1951), Riding with Buffalo Bill (1954), et al. During the 1950s he continued working as an assistant director, mostly with his uncle, in feature films such as A Yank in Korea (1951), The Giant Claw (1957), Face of a Fugitive (1959), and Angel Baby (1961). Besides his big screen work, Katzman also served on television shows, including The Adventures of Wild Bill Hickok, The Mickey Rooney Show, and Bat Masterson.

In 1960, Katzman made his production debut. He served as assistant director and associate producer on all four seasons of the adventure drama Route 66 (1960–1964), which he would later regard as his favorite production. His additional early work in television production (and occasional writing and directing) includes the crime drama Tallahassee 7000 (1961), western drama The Wild Wild West (1965–1969), the second season of crime drama Hawaii Five-O (1969–1970), legal drama Storefront Lawyers (1970–1971), the final five seasons of western drama Gunsmoke (1970–1975) as well as its spinoff series Dirty Sally (1974), legal drama Petrocelli (1974–1976) for which he was nominated an Edgar Allan Poe Award, and the two science fiction dramas The Fantastic Journey (1977) and Logan's Run (1977–1978). In 1965, he wrote, produced, and directed the science fiction film Space Probe Taurus (also known as Space Monster). Aside from his work as assistant director, this was his only venture into feature films.

=== Dallas ===
In 1978, Katzman served as producer for the five-part miniseries Dallas, which would evolve into one of television's longest-running dramas until 1991. While David Jacobs created the series, Katzman became the de facto showrunner during the second season, as Jacobs stepped down to create and later run the Dallas spin-off series Knots Landing. Under Katzman's lead, Dallas, whose first episodes had consisted of self-contained stories, evolved into a serial, leading into the '80s trend of prime-time soap operas.

While Katzman headed Dallas' writing staff from the show's second season, he remained producer, with Philip Capice serving as executive producer. The creative conflicts between Capice and Katzman eventually led to Katzman stepping down from his production duties on the show for season nine, instead being billed as a "creative consultant" (during this time, he also worked on the short-lived drama series Our Family Honor). However, increased production costs and decreasing ratings caused production company Lorimar—along with series star Larry Hagman (J. R. Ewing)—to ask Katzman to return to the show in his old capacity. Katzman agreed, reportedly under the condition that he would have "total authority" on the show, and as of the tenth season premiere, he was promoted to executive producer, and Capice was let go.

Katzman remained as executive producer on Dallas until the series finale in May 1991. Besides his production work, he also wrote and directed more series episodes than anyone else.

=== After Dallas ===
Following "Dallas", Katzman went on to create the short-lived crime drama Dangerous Curves (1992-1993), which aired as a part of CBS' late-night drama block Crimetime After Primetime, and serve as executive producer for the second season of the action drama Walker, Texas Ranger (1994-1995). His last work was the 1996 "Dallas" reunion movie J.R. Returns, which he also wrote and directed.

== Personal life and death ==
Katzman fathered his first child, Gary Katzman, with Eileen Leener (1929–2019). Katzman did not raise his first child and left his mother when he was four years old. The child was eventually adopted and took the surname Klein. Through Gary Klein, Katzman is the biological grandfather of internet personality Ethan Klein of the YouTube comedy podcast H3 Podcast.

Leonard Katzman and his wife LaRue Farlow Katzman had three children. His daughter, actress Sherril Lynn Rettino (1956–1995), predeceased her father by one year. She played the recurring character Jackie Dugan in Dallas from 1979 to 91. His sons Mitchell Wayne Katzman and Frank Katzman, and son-in-law John Rettino all worked on the production of Dallas' later seasons. Both sons were also involved producing Dangerous Curves, Walker, Texas Ranger, and J. R. Returns.

Katzman died of a heart attack in Malibu, California, on September 5, 1996, three days after his 69th birthday and more than two months prior to the airing of his last production, Dallas: J.R. Returns. There is a dedication to him just before the closing credits of Dallas: J.R. Returns. He was interred in the Mount Sinai Memorial Park in Los Angeles.

== Filmography ==
Excluding work as assistant director.

Year	Title	Creator	Writer	Producer	Director
1960-1964	Route 66			✓	
1961	Tallahassee 7000			✓	
1965	Space Probe Taurus (feature film)	✓	✓	✓	✓
1965-1969	The Wild Wild West		✓	✓	
1969-1970	Hawaii Five-O, season 2			✓	
1970-1971	Storefront Lawyers			✓	
1970-1975	Gunsmoke, seasons 16–20			✓	✓
1974	Dirty Sally		✓	✓	✓
1974-1976	Petrocelli		✓	✓	✓
1977	The Fantastic Journey		✓	✓	
1977-1978	Logan's Run		✓	✓	
1978-1991	Dallas		✓	✓	✓
1985-1986	Our Family Honor		✓	✓	
1992-1993	Dangerous Curves	✓	✓	✓	
1994-1995	Walker, Texas Ranger, season 2		✓	✓	
1996	Dallas: J. R. Returns (TV movie)	✓	✓	✓	✓

== Awards ==
1997: Lone Star Film & Television Awards - Special Award
