= Camille Marchetta =

American novelist

- Born: September 15, 1940 (age 85); New York City, U.S.
- Occupations: Television writer/producer, novelist
- Years active: 1978–present
- Website: www.camillemarchetta.com

Camille Marchetta (born September 15, 1940), a former London literary agent, is a novelist, television writer and producer best known for her work on 1980s prime time soap operas Dallas, Dynasty and Falcon Crest.

== Biography ==
Born and raised in Brooklyn, New York to an Italian American family, Marchetta attended the College of New Rochelle in New Rochelle, New York, where she later received a BA in English literature. After a trip to England, she decided to stay and took up residence there. While in England she worked with Richard Hatton Limited where she later became a literary director for the company.

== Career ==
Prior to writing for the 1980s soap opera Dallas she wrote a screenplay for a television movie that was never produced, along with one episode for the short running series Lucan. On Dallas she started as a freelance writer and eventually made her way on to the writing staff, responsible for writing major story and plot lines. She also created some of the characters on the show. After Dallas she worked on Dynasty, Falcon Crest and Nurse.

== Published works ==
Marchetta has authored three novels:

- Lovers And Friends, ISBN 978-0671869267, 48 pages (Paperback), Publisher:Pocket Books, Reprint edition, Publication date:03/02/1995.
- The River By Moonlight, ISBN 978-1602640177, Published by: Virtualbookworm.com, 376 pages, Publication date: 08/01/2007.
- The Wives Of Frankie Ferrarro, ISBN 978-1250106513, Published by: St. Martin's Press, 12/08/2015. Sold by: Macmillan Publishers.
