= Irving J. Moore =

American television director

- Born: Irving Joseph Moore; April 7, 1919; Chicago, Illinois, U.S.
- Died: July 2, 1993 (aged 74); Sherman Oaks, California, U.S.
- Occupation: Television director
- Years active: 1957–1991
- Spouse: Shirlee Moore
- Children: 3

Irving Joseph Moore (April 7, 1919 – July 2, 1993) was an American television director.

Moore was born in Chicago, Illinois, and grew up in Hollywood, California. He began work as a messenger for Columbia Pictures, eventually becoming an assistant director. In 1957 he directed an episode of the American western television series Tales of the Texas Rangers.

Moore later directed episodes of Maverick, Bonanza, The Wild Wild West, Hawaii Five-O, Gunsmoke, Eight Is Enough (on which the best friend of youngest child Nicholas was named Irving J. Moore and they had to make a big deal out of using the full name with middle initial EVERY TIME he was mentioned, i.e. "Nicholas went over to Irving J. Moore's house"), Hogan's Heroes, Here Come the Brides, Lost in Space, The Guns of Will Sonnett, Perry Mason and 77 Sunset Strip. He also directed the primetime soap operas Dynasty and Dallas, including the top-rated episode "Who Shot JR?" His last credit as director was in 1991 on a four-part Dynasty mini-series.

Moore died in July 1993 of heart failure in Sherman Oaks, California, at the age of 74.
