= List of Dallas (1978 TV series) cast members =

This is a list of actors appearing on the 1978–1991 US television series Dallas. During its 14 seasons on air, the show featured 21 regular cast members. Furthermore, 32 actors were billed as "also starring" during the first scene of the episodes, and 24 were billed as "special guest star" in the closing credits. Additionally, hundreds more were billed as either guest stars or co-stars. This list includes those with at least eight appearances.

== Cast timeline ==
Character	Actor	Dallas (1978–1991)														J.R. Returns (1996)	War of the Ewings (1998)	Dallas (2012–2014)		
Character	Actor	1	2	3	4	5	6	7	8	9	10	11	12	13	14	J.R. Returns (1996)	War of the Ewings (1998)	1	2	3
Miss Ellie Ewing Farlow (Note: This character is played by a younger actor in Dallas: The Early Years (1986) set in 1933 to 1951. The cast includes Ellie (Molly Hagan), Jock (Dale Midkiff), Bobby (Ryan Beadle), J.R. (Kevin Wixted), Pam (Andrea Wauters) and Cliff (Johnny Felder).)	Barbara Bel Geddes	M	M	M	M	M	M	M		M	M	M	M	M						
Miss Ellie Ewing Farlow	Donna Reed								M (Note: Reed first appears as Ellie in "Homecoming" (ep. 8.7). She is added to the opening credits from "Oil Baron's Ball III" (ep. 8.8).)											
Jock Ewing	Jim Davis	M	M	M	M															
Bobby Ewing	Patrick Duffy	M	M	M	M	M	M	M	M	G (Note: Credited as "_______".)	M	M	M	M	M	M	M	M	M	M
J.R. Ewing	Larry Hagman	M	M	M	M	M	M	M	M	M	M	M	M	M	M	M	M	M	M	A
Pamela Barnes Ewing	Victoria Principal	M	M	M	M	M	M	M	M	M	M	S	G (Note: Pam is played by Margaret Michaels in "Carousel" (ep. 12.1), who also plays look-a-like Jeanne O'Brien in season 13.)							
Lucy Ewing	Charlene Tilton	M	M	M	M	M	M	M	M			G	M	M				R	G	G
Sue Ellen Ewing	Linda Gray	R	M	M	M	M	M	M	M	M	M	M	M		S (Note: Appears only in the opening credits of "Conundrum" (ep. 14.22), the series finale set in an alternate universe in which J.R. had never been born.)	M	M	M	M	M
Ray Krebbs	Steve Kanaly	R	M (Note: Kanaly departs in "The Fat Lady Singeth" (ep. 11.30). He returns to the opening credits from "War and Love and the Whole Damned Thing" (ep. 12.6) to "The Sting" (ep. 12.10).)	M	M	M	M	M	M	M	M	M	M		S		M	G	G	G
Cliff Barnes	Ken Kercheval	R	R	M	M	M	M	M	M	M	M	M	M	M	M	M		R	R	R
Donna Culver Krebbs	Susan Howard		G	R	R	M	M	M	M	M	M									
Clayton Farlow	Howard Keel				G	R	R	R	M	M	M	M	M	M	M					
Jenna Wade	Priscilla Beaulieu Presley		G (Note: Jenna is played by Morgan Fairchild in "Old Acquaintance" (ep. 2.3), and Francine Tacker in "Jenna's Return" (ep. 3.18) and "Sue Ellen's Choice" (ep. 3.19).)	G				R	M	M	M	M								
Jack Ewing	Dack Rambo								R	R	M (Note: Rambo departs in "Bar-B-Cued" (ep. 10.13). He returns to the opening credits for "Some Good, Some Bad" (ep. 10.24) and "War and Peace" (ep. 10.25).)									
April Stevens Ewing	Sheree J. Wilson										R	R	M	M	M					
Michelle Stevens	Kimberly Foster (Note: Foster also plays a fling of Nick's in "Tough Love" (ep. 11.6).)													M	M					
Carter McKay	George Kennedy												R	M	M	M	M			
Cally Harper Ewing	Cathy Podewell												R	M	M				G	
James Beaumont	Sasha Mitchell													M	M					
Stephanie Rogers	Lesley-Anne Down													M (Note: Down is added to the opening credits from "Unchain My Heart" (ep. 13.15) to "Three, Three, Three" (ep. 13.27).)						
Liz Adams	Barbara Stock (Note: Stock also plays Heather Wilson in "The Split" (ep. 5.8) and "Head of the Family" (ep. 5.15).)													R	M					
Kristin Shepard	Mary Crosby			R	R										S					
Adam	Joel Grey														S					
Jack Scalia	Nicholas Pearce											R			S					
Gary Ewing	Ted Shackelford		G (Note: Gary is played by David Ackroyd in "Reunion" (ep. 2.1 & 2.2).)	G	R	G	G			G					S				R	
Valene Ewing	Joan Van Ark		G	G	G	G									S				G	
Julia Cunningham	Rosalind Allen (Note: Allen also plays Bobby's wife Annie in the alternate universe in "Conundrum" (ep. 14.22).)															M				
Christopher Ewing	Christopher Demetral					G	G	R (Note: Christopher is played by unknown infant actors in season 5, Eric Farlow in seasons 6–7 and Joshua Harris in seasons 8–14.)	R	R	R	R	R	R	R	M				
Christopher Ewing	Jesse Metcalfe																	M	M	M
John Ross Ewing III	Omri Katz			R (Note: John Ross is played by Tyler Banks in seasons 3–6, before Katz takes over the role.)	R	R	R	R	R	R	R	R	R	R	R	M				
John Ross Ewing III	Josh Henderson																	M	M	M
Pamela Rebecca Cooper	Deborah Kellner												G (Note: Pamela is played by Jenna Pangburn in "Yellow Brick Road" (ep. 12.23) and "The Sound of Money (ep. 12.24).)			M				
Pamela Rebecca Cooper	Julie Gonzalo																	M	M	M
Afton Cooper	Audrey Landers				R	R	R	R	G				R	G		M			G	G
Anita Smithfield	Tracy Scoggins (Note: Scoggins also plays Dianne Kelly in "My Brother's Keeper" (ep. 7.4).)															M	M			
Jennifer Jantzen	Michelle Johnson (Note: Johnson also plays Rhonda Cummings in "The Verdict" (ep. 8.24).)																M			
Elena Ramos	Jordana Brewster																	M	M	M
Ann Ewing	Brenda Strong (Note: Strong also plays a fling of Cliff's in "Cat and Mouse" (ep. 10.18).)																	M	M	M
Harris Ryland	Mitch Pileggi (Note: Pileggi also plays a cowboy in "Barbecue Four" (ep. 7.12), and Morrisey in "Three Three Three" (ep. 13.26), "April in Paris" (ep. 14.1) and "Charade" (ep. 14.2).)																	R	M	M
Emma Brown	Emma Bell																		M	M
Drew Ramos	Kuno Becker																		M	R
Nicolas Treviño	Juan Pablo Di Pace																			M

Cast notes

== Starring ==
- Barbara Bel Geddes as Miss Ellie Ewing (280 episodes)
- Jim Davis as Jock Ewing (75 episodes)
- Lesley-Anne Down as Stephanie Rogers (13 episodes)
- Patrick Duffy as Bobby Ewing (327 episodes)
- Kimberly Foster as Michelle Stevens (51 episodes)
- Linda Gray as Sue Ellen Ewing (308 episodes)
- Larry Hagman as J. R. Ewing (357 episodes)
- Susan Howard as Donna Culver Krebbs (198 episodes)
- Steve Kanaly as Ray Krebbs (286 episodes)
- Howard Keel as Clayton Farlow (266 episodes)
- George Kennedy as Carter McKay (76 episodes)
- Ken Kercheval as Cliff Barnes (344 episodes)
- Sasha Mitchell as James Beaumont (46 episodes)
- Cathy Podewell as Cally Harper Ewing (71 episodes)
- Priscilla Beaulieu Presley as Jenna Wade (144 episodes)
- Victoria Principal as Pamela Barnes Ewing (251 episodes)
- Dack Rambo as Jack Ewing (51 episodes)
- Donna Reed as Miss Ellie Ewing Farlow (24 episodes)
- Barbara Stock as Liz Adams (28 episodes)
- Charlene Tilton as Lucy Ewing Cooper (246 episodes)
- Sheree J. Wilson as April Stevens Ewing (128 episodes)

== Also starring ==
- John Beck as Mark Graison (67 episodes, seasons 6–7 and 9)
- Morgan Brittany as Katherine Wentworth (56 episodes, seasons 5–8 and 11)
- Barbara Carrera as Angelica Nero (25 episodes, season 9)
- Mary Crosby as Kristin Shepard (28 episodes, seasons 3–4 and 14)
- Barbara Eden as LeeAnn De La Vega (5 episodes, season 14)
- Susan Flannery as Leslie Stewart (11 episodes, season 4)
- Steve Forrest as Ben Stivers (3 episodes, season 9) and Wes Parmalee (12 episodes, season 10)
- John Harkins as Control (4 episodes, season 14). Also guest starring as Judge Jay Potter (1 episode, season 2).
- Jenilee Harrison as Jamie Ewing Barnes (70 episodes, seasons 8–10)
- Gayle Hunnicutt as Vanessa Beaumont (13 episodes, seasons 12–14)
- Clifton James as Duke Carlisle (4 episodes, season 14)
- Karen Kopins as Kay Lloyd (12 episodes, seasons 11 and 13)
- Audrey Landers as Afton Cooper (84 episodes, seasons 4–8 and 12–13)
- Susan Lucci as Hillary Taylor (6 episodes, seasons 14)
- Jared Martin as Steven "Dusty" Farlow (34 episodes, seasons 3–6, 8–9 and 14)
- Leigh McCloskey as Mitch Cooper (46 episodes, seasons 4–5, 8 and 12)
- Ian McShane as Don Lockwood (13 episodes, season 12)
- Timothy Patrick Murphy as Mickey Trotter (26 episodes, seasons 6–7)
- Priscilla Pointer as Rebecca Barnes Wentworth (44 episodes, seasons 4–6)
- Randolph Powell as Alan Beam (18 episodes, seasons 3–4)
- Denver Pyle as Blackie Callahan (2 episodes, season 13)
- Bert Remsen as Harrison "Dandy" Dandridge (10 episodes, season 11)
- Jack Scalia as Nicholas Pearce (29 episodes, seasons 11 and 14)
- Deborah Shelton as Mandy Winger (63 episodes, seasons 8–10)
- Marc Singer as Matt Cantrell (12 episodes, season 9)
- Alexis Smith as Lady Jessica Montford (11 episodes, seasons 7 and 13)
- William Smithers as Jeremy Wendell (50 episodes, seasons 4–5 and 8–12)
- Andrew Stevens as Casey Denault (33 episodes, seasons 11–12)
- Leigh Taylor-Young as Kimberly Cryder (20 episodes, seasons 11–12)
- Beth Toussaint as Tracey Lawton (17 episodes, seasons 12–13)
- Keenan Wynn as Willard "Digger" Barnes (10 episodes, season 3)

== Special guest stars ==
- John Anderson as Dr. Herbert Styles (7 episodes, season 11). Also guest starring as Richard McIntyre (2 episodes, season 6).
- E. J. André as Eugene Bullock (6 episodes, seasons 3–4 and 6)
- Christopher Atkins as Peter Richards (27 episodes, season 7)
- Joanna Cassidy as Sally Bullock (2 episodes, season 4)
- Barry Corbin as Sheriff Fenton Washburn (9 episodes, seasons 3 and 5–7)
- Henry Darrow as Garcia (2 episodes, season 6)
- Howard Duff as Senator Henry Harrison O'Dell (2 episodes, season 11)
- Stephen Elliott as Scotty Demarest (14 episodes, seasons 3, 8 and 10)
- Mel Ferrer as Harrison Page (2 episodes, season 3)
- Anne Francis as Arliss Cooper (4 episodes, season 4)
- Joel Grey as Adam (2 episodes, season 14)
- Nicholas Hammond as Bill Johnson (3 episodes, season 6)
- John Lehne as Kyle Bennett (2 episodes, season 4)
- Monte Markham as Clint Ogden (9 episodes, season 4)
- John McIntire as Sam Culver (1 episode, season 2)
- Donald Moffat as Brooks Oliver (3 episodes, season 6)
- Barry Nelson as Arthur Elrod (3 episodes, season 5)
- Daniel Pilon as Naldo Marchetta (9 episodes, seasons 7-8)
- Don Porter as Matt Devlin (4 episodes, season 3)
- William Prince as Alex Garrett (5 episodes, season 9)
- Dale Robertson as Frank Crutcher (5 episodes, season 6)
- Annabel Schofield as Laurel Ellis (11 episodes, season 11)
- Martha Scott as Patricia Shepard (10 episodes, seasons 2–3 and 9)
- Ted Shackelford as Gary Ewing (9 episodes, seasons 3–6, 9 and 14)
- Joan Van Ark as Valene Clements Ewing (8 episodes, seasons 2–5 and 14)
- David Wayne as Willard "Digger" Barnes (4 episodes, seasons 1–2)

== Guest stars ==
- Michael Alldredge as Don Horton (3 episodes, season 4) and Steve Jackson (4 episodes, season 8) and Ray King (2 episodes, season 14)
- Barbara Babcock as Liz Craig (16 episodes, seasons 2–5)
- Stephanie Blackmore as Serena Wald (20 episodes, seasons 3, 5–8, 11 and 13)
- Martin E. Brooks as Edgar Randolph (10 episodes, seasons 7–8)
- James L. Brown as Sergeant Harry McSween (41 episodes, seasons 2–12)
- Burke Byrnes as Pete Adams (9 episodes, seasons 8–9)
- George Chakiris as Nicholas (11 episodes, season 9)
- Lois Chiles as Holly Harwood (25 episodes, seasons 6–7)
- Jeff Cooper as Dr. Simon Ellby (19 episodes, seasons 3–4)
- Glenn Corbett as Paul Morgan (18 episodes, seasons 7 and 9–11)
- Karlene Crockett as Muriel Gillis (12 episodes, seasons 2–6)
- Joel Fabiani as Alex Ward (8 episodes, season 4)
- Fern Fitzgerald as Marilee Stone (73 episodes, seasons 2–13)
- Tom Fuccello as Dave Culver (35 episodes, seasons 3–6, 8, 10–11 and 13–14)
- Jeri Gaile as Rose Daniels McKay (20 episodes, seasons 12–14)
- Jonathan Goldsmith as Joe Smith (3 episodes, season 5) and Bruce Harvey (16 episodes, seasons 10 and 12)
- Laurence Haddon as Franklin Horner (17 episodes, seasons 4–6 and 9–10)
- Joshua Harris as Christopher Ewing (112 episodes, seasons 9–14)
- Art Hindle as Jeff Farraday (11 episodes, season 5)
- Alice Hirson as Mavis Anderson (26 episodes, seasons 6–7 and 10–11)
- Deirdre Imershein as Jory Taylor (8 episodes, season 14)
- Barry Jenner as Dr. Jerry Kenderson (25 episodes, seasons 7–9)
- Omri Katz as John Ross Ewing III (152 episodes, seasons 7–14)
- Kenneth Kimmins as Thornton McLeish (11 episodes, seasons 6–7)
- Fredric Lehne as Eddie Cronin (19 episodes, season 8)
- Arthur Malet as Mr. Forest (3 episodes, season 5) and Ryan (5 episodes, seasons 13–14)
- Shalane McCall as Charlie Wade (102 episodes, seasons 7–11)
- Derek McGrath as Oswald Valentine (15 episodes, seasons 10–11)
- Jim McMullan as Andrew Dowling (14 episodes, season 10)
- Bill Morey as Judge (1 episode, season 5) and Leo Wakefield (11 episodes, season 7–8 and 11)
- Dennis Patrick as Vaughn Leland (19 episodes, seasons 3, 5 and 7–8)
- J. Eddie Peck as Tommy McKay (13 episodes, seasons 12–13)
- George O. Petrie as Harv Smithfield (54 episodes, seasons 3–14)
- Ben Piazza as Walt Discoll (11 episodes, season 6)
- J.A. Preston as Leo Daltry (9 episodes, season 10)
- Dennis Redfield as Roger Larson (12 episodes, season 5)
- Kate Reid as Lil Trotter (17 episodes, seasons 6–7 and 9)
- Deborah Rennard as Sly Lovegren (188 episodes, seasons 5–14)
- Don Starr as Jordan Lee (89 episodes, seasons 2–14)
- Amy Stock as Lisa Alden (16 episodes, season 11)
- Christopher Stone as Dave Stratton (9 episodes, seasons 4 and 8)
- Deborah Tranelli as Phyllis Wapner (147 episodes, seasons 4–14)
- Merete Van Kamp as Grace Van Owen (17 episodes, season 9)
- Hunter von Leer as B.D. Calhoun (10 episodes, season 10)
- Michael Wilding as Alex Barton (9 episodes, season 13)
- Ray Wise as Blair Sullivan (8 episodes, seasons 5–6)
- Morgan Woodward as Marvin "Punk" Anderson (55 episodes, seasons 4–11)
- Gretchen Wyler as Dr. Dagmara Conrad (8 episodes, season 5)
- Kathleen York as Betty (10 episodes, season 8)
- John Zaremba as Dr. Harlen Danvers (13 episodes, seasons 2–3 and 5–10)

== Co-stars ==
- Robert Ackerman as Wade Luce (13 episodes, seasons 2–6)
- Mary Armstrong as Louise (17 episodes, seasons 6–8)
- Tyler Banks as John Ross Ewing III (38 episodes, seasons 4–6)
- Joseph Campanella as Joseph Lombardi Sr. (season 12)
- Roseanna Christiansen as Teresa (119 episodes, seasons 6–14)
- Pat Colbert as Dora Mae (70 episodes, seasons 7–14)
- Blue Deckert as various roles (11 episodes, seasons 7–8 and 10–12)
- Eric Farlow as Christopher Ewing (44 episodes, seasons 6–8)
- Phyllis Flax as Mrs. Chambers (8 episodes, season 5–6)
- Meg Gallagher as Louella Caraway Lee (37 episodes, seasons 2–4)
- Tony Garcia as Raoul (22 episodes, seasons 7–12)
- John Hart as various roles (8 episodes, seasons 2–4)
- John Hoge as Detective Ratagan (14 episodes, seasons 12–14)
- Laura Johnson as Betty Lou Barker (3 episodes, season 3)
- Anne C. Lucas as Cassie (53 episodes, seasons 5–10)
- Jeanna Michaels as Connie Brasher (32 episodes, seasons 2–4)
- Joanna Miles as Martha Randolph (4 episodes, season 8)
- Richard Narita as Eugene Inagaki (5 episodes, seasons 13-14)
- J.T. O'Connor as various roles (9 episodes, seasons 3–5, 8 and 11–14)
- Peyton Park as various roles (9 episodes, seasons 2–3, 5–7 and 11–12)
- Brad Pitt as Randy (4 episodes, season 11)
- Karen Radcliffe as various roles (8 episodes, seasons 6, 8–9 and 11)
- Josef Rainer as man (1 episode, season 6) and Mr. Barton (8 episodes, season 10) and Dr. David Gordon (1 episode, season 12)
- Sherril Lynn Rettino as Jackie Dugan (186 episodes, season 2–5 and 7–14)
- Marina Rice as Angela (12 episodes, seasons 7–8 and 10)
- Carol Sanchez as woman (2 episodes, season 6) and Angela (6 episodes, season 9) and Carmen (2 episodes, season 12)
- Danone Simpson as Kendall Chapman (103 episodes, seasons 6–14)
- Kehly Sloane as Kelly (19 episodes, seasons 11–12)
- Solomon Smaniotto as Tony Krebbs (9 episodes, season 9)
- Paul Sorensen as Andy Bradley (33 episodes, seasons 2–10)
- Frank Swann as bartender (9 episodes, seasons 8, 10–12 and 14)
- Deborah Marie Taylor as Debbie (37 episodes, seasons 11–14)
- Woody Watson as Carl Huckstead (3 episodes, season 10)
- Lacy Wayne as helicopter pilot (24 episodes, seasons 6-8 and 10–12)
- Buck Young as Seth Stone (3 episodes, season 2)
