= Conundrum (Dallas) =

- Dallas episodes
- Episode nos.: Season 14; Episodes 22 & 23
- Directed by: Leonard Katzman
- Written by: Leonard Katzman
- Production code: 356-357
- Original air date: May 3, 1991

Guest appearances
- Mary Crosby as Kristin Shepard; Linda Gray as Sue Ellen Shepard; Joel Grey as Adam; Steve Kanaly as Ray Krebbs; Jack Scalia as Nicholas Pearce; Ted Shackelford as Gary Ewing; Joan Van Ark as Valene Wallace; Anthony Addabbo as Jeff Peters; Rosalind Allen as Annie Ewing; Leslie Bevis as Jeanne Lawrence; James T. Callahan as Mr. Smith; Katherine Cannon as Beth Krebbs; Denise Gentile as Courtney Ewing; Kim Johnston Ulrich as Bootsie Ewing; Katherine Justice as Alice Kingdom; Richard Lineback as Eb; Teri Ann Linn as Kimberly Kavanaugh; Tricia O'Neil as Barbara Barnes; Patrick Pankhurst as Jason Ewing; Barbara Rhoades as Judy; Tony Auer as Ted; Sylvia Brooks as Carol; Brioni Farrell as Alice Anne; Dan Livingston as Edgar; James Newell as Walter Kingdom; Robert Neches as Bob; Herman Poppe as Wally Ford; Jerry Potter as Bartender; Edson Stroll as Charlie Haas; Christine Joan Taylor as Margaret Barnes; Deborah Marie Taylor as Debbie; Virginia Watson as Secretary; Wayne Chou as Houseboy; Kim Delgado as Stage manager; Conor Duffy as Little J. R. Ewing; Tim Eyster as Jock Krebbs; Kate Horton as Little Ellie Ewing; Michael Gonda as Cally's kid #1; Jonathan Gonda as Cally's kid #2; Stephen Held as young man; David Katzman as Bobby Ewing Jr; Kenyon Moad as Cally's 3-year-old; John Mueller as Harry; Nicolas Read as Cliff Barnes Jr.; Mike Simmrin as Andy Krebbs; Gregory White as Kleever

Episode chronology
| ← Previous "The Decline and Fall of the Ewing Empire" | Next → — |
- Dallas (1978 TV series, season 14)

"Conundrum" is the 22nd episode and series finale of the fourteenth season of the American television drama series Dallas, and the 356th episode of the series overall. The episode was written and directed by showrunner Leonard Katzman and first aired on CBS in the United States on May 3, 1991, as a double-length episode. Subsequent airings in syndication split the episode into individual hours, which raises the total episode count to 23 for the season and 357 for the series.

The plot of the episode mirrors that of the 1946 film It's a Wonderful Life, as J. R. Ewing is taken on a journey to visit what would become of the Ewing family had he never existed.

== Plot ==
=== Background ===
It has taken many years and numerous efforts by a multitude of people over the course of his life, but finally J.R. Ewing (Larry Hagman) has been reduced to practically nothing. He has lost control of the Southfork ranch, which was given to Bobby (Patrick Duffy) by Clayton Farlow (Howard Keel) after Clayton decided to spend more time traveling with Miss Ellie (Barbara Bel Geddes).

J.R.'s business empire has also crumbled. Clayton gave him voting power on the board at WestStar Oil, but through the scheming of Clayton's son Dusty (Jared Martin) and WestStar executive Carter McKay (George Kennedy), J.R. was tricked into selling the controlling stake in Ewing Oil to his archenemy, Cliff Barnes (Ken Kercheval). After McKay revealed the ruse to J.R., McKay promptly fired J.R. from WestStar and left him with no form of employment. Additionally, J.R.'s long-time secretary Sly Lovegren (Deborah Rennard) left Ewing Oil to marry, and Bobby's secretary Phyllis Wapner (Deborah Tranelli) walks out telling J.R. that "Hell would freeze over" before she worked for him.

Finally, J.R. lost his closest family member as his son and namesake John Ross (Omri Katz) disowned him, deciding to stay in London to be with his mother Sue Ellen (Linda Gray) and her new husband Don Lockwood (Ian McShane). The fallout from these events appeared to be too much for J.R. to bear, and as the penultimate episode drew to a close, he took his father Jock’s pearl-handled six-shooter out of his nightstand.

=== Events ===
In the intervening time between the end of the previous episode and the beginning of this one, J.R. has consumed a significant amount of bourbon whiskey and is walking around Southfork in a drunken stupor. He is still holding Jock’s revolver, and is seriously considering whether or not to turn it on himself and end what is left of his life.

A spirit named Adam (portrayed by Joel Grey) pays a visit to J.R., who cannot believe what he is seeing. The white tuxedo-clad Adam tells J.R. his "boss" likes him and has dispatched him to Earth. In a parallel with the storyline of the movie It's a Wonderful Life, Adam proceeds to take J.R. on a journey to show him what life would have been like for other people if he had not been born. Among what he shows him:

- J.R.'s place as eldest Ewing child would have been taken by Gary (Ted Shackelford), who would also take over for J.R. as heir to the Ewing Oil fortune. Bobby thus becomes the middle brother, and the Ewings would have a third son named Jason (Patrick Pankhurst).
- Since Gary was not anywhere near the oil man that his brothers were, Ewing Oil went bankrupt under his watch. As such, Jock committed suicide when the company went bust. Heartbroken, Miss Ellie had the coroner record his cause of death as a stress-related illness, and herself died two years later, blaming herself for having forced Jock to hand the company over to Gary, and never meeting Clayton Farlow. The non-existent Jason would have become a shady real estate developer and cheating husband who would eventually trick Bobby and Gary into selling their stakes in Ewing Oil and Southfork, leaving the property in his hands once his parents died. This would result in the destruction of the ranch in favor of "Southfork Estates", a development of tract houses built in its wake. Jason would also become a family pariah, as Gary wants nothing to do with him and Bobby was swindled out of $500,000 in a bad real estate deal of his.
- Having never met Pam due to there being no rivalry between J.R. and Pam's brother Cliff, and due in part to losing all of his savings in Jason's deal gone wrong, Bobby's wild ways caught up with him and he became a down-and-out hustler owing thousands in gambling debts and child support which he cannot pay.
- One of the people Bobby owes money to is Carter McKay, who instead of getting into the oil business instead became a Las Vegas casino owner. Bobby is able to finagle his way out of paying back McKay, but it will not be the last time he runs into financial trouble according to Adam.
- Gary spent his life becoming a successful divorce lawyer in Beverly Hills, who never married and thus never had J.R.'s niece Lucy. However, he still meets Valene Clements—in this universe, Valene Wallace—who is seeking an inheritance from her late husband's estate. They agree to go on a date together, and Adam hints that Gary and Val were always destined to meet.
- Without having met J.R., Cally Harper never left her poor roots, and lives with an abusive husband in a shack. She finally takes a stand and shoots him dead, but will eventually go to jail for murder because no one would believe her husband beat her (according to what Adam tells J.R.).
- Without J.R. in the way and forcing him to be a part of the Ewing-Barnes rivalry, Cliff Barnes became a politician and eventually Vice President of the United States. An incredulous J.R., especially after Cliff has to assume the Presidential duties due to the sitting President being incapacitated by a stroke, expresses his disbelief about the entire situation and tells Adam that Cliff as President would be one of the worst things to happen to the United States. Adam goes on to tell J.R. that Cliff will become one of the great Presidents regardless of how he feels about it ("Nobody said you had to like it, J.R.," Adam specifically tells him).
- Since J.R. was never born (and thus never shot), Kristin Shepard never met him (and thus never died), and became a successful con artist in Los Angeles. She poses as a hooker initially and then a police officer, which sees her accept a bribe from an embarrassed customer.
- Having never met J.R., Sue Ellen has entered acting and become a successful soap opera star. Since Nicholas Pearce never met J.R. (and thus was never shoved out of the window to his death), he was able to form a relationship with Sue Ellen, who did not develop her alcohol problem that plagued her throughout her marriage.
- With J.R. out of the picture and Jock dying before he could find out, Ray Krebbs never knew of his Ewing blood ties. After an injury he suffered in a Ewing Oil-sponsored rodeo, Ray was forced to become a ranch hand and would often find himself out of work. Fortunately for Ray, however, he was able to have a great family life with a wife and children who loved him unconditionally, even if he could not always provide for them. One of his sons is named Jock.

After being taken through this journey, Adam tries to get J.R. to shoot himself. J.R. tells Adam he does not want to give Adam the satisfaction as he went back to Heaven. Adam then asks J.R. what made him think he was dispatched from Heaven and begins laughing demonically, revealing his true purpose. J.R. is immediately jolted awake in his bedroom while still holding the bourbon bottle and the revolver. He appears relieved that it was only a nightmare, but once again, Adam appears to J.R., this time in the bedroom mirror in a red suit. Adam is determined to have J.R. shoot himself, reminding him of reality for J.R. and the current state of his life and how better off everyone concerned would be. J.R. seems willing to oblige.

Meanwhile, Bobby has returned to Southfork for the night. J.R. does not hear him pull up or enter the house, as his focus is solely on Adam in his mirror. He slowly raises the gun to his head and cocks the hammer, and the frustrated Adam finally screams "Do it!" to J.R. with glowing red eyes. Bobby hears a gunshot and runs to the second floor to J.R.'s bedroom. As he reaches the doorway, he looks into the room and is horrified by what he sees, exclaiming "Oh, my God!". The episode concludes with a freeze frame shot of Bobby in the doorway, and the series ends with the fate of J.R. unknown.

=== Resolution ===
The "Conundrum" cliffhanger was not resolved until 1996, with the first Dallas reunion movie, Dallas: J.R. Returns. During J.R.'s return to Southfork, Bobby comments on how he found J.R. babbling incoherently, claiming the devil was talking to him; the shot J.R. fired blew a giant hole in the mirror and he left for Paris the next day.

When Dallas was relaunched in 2012, the events of both of the reunion films (J.R. Returns and 1998's War of the Ewings) were ignored. J.R., however, was present when the revival series premiered and remained a character for the first season and a half; following Larry Hagman's death, J.R. was shot and killed by an associate at his request as he was dying of terminal cancer.

== Reception ==
Although the audience had dwindled considerably, with the series ending at #63 for the 1990-91 season, Dallas' final telecast was the second highest rated program of the week. "Conundrum" pulled a 22 rating and 38% share of the audience. This was Dallas' highest rated episode since the January 23, 1987 episode "Night Visitor".

The two-part season finale is the 15th most watched television series finale in American history. The sharp decline in the soap's audience had been largely attributed to the early 1990s decrease in Friday primetime viewership as Friday nights gradually had become graveyard slots on American television. In 2011, the whole two-part finale was ranked #13 on the TV Guide Network special, TV's Most Unforgettable Finales.
