= The Furious and the Fast =

- Dallas episode
- Episode no.: Season 2 Episode 7
- Directed by: Rodney Charters
- Written by: Julia Cohen
- Original air date: March 4, 2013

Guest appearances
- Ted Shackelford as Gary Ewing; Judith Light as Judith Brown Ryland; Kevin Page as Steve "Bum" Jones; Curtis Wayne as Denny Boyd; Ricky Rudd as himself

Episode chronology
← Previous "Blame Game"	Next → "J.R.'s Masterpiece"

"The Furious and the Fast" is the seventh episode in the second season (2013) of the television series Dallas. The episode marks the last appearance of J.R. Ewing (played by Larry Hagman).

== Summary ==
J.R. is in Abu Dhabi closing some oil leases. Ewing Energies has its first board meeting with its two new board members: Sue Ellen Ewing and Pamela Barnes. Christopher and Bobby tells John Ross, Sue Ellen, and Pamela that they will revoke the Mineral Rights on Southfork Ranch if they do not return Elena's assets including her shares in Ewing Energies. John Ross is not intimidated and threatens to sell off Christopher's methane patent to keep the company from going bankrupt. Since John Ross and Sue Ellen together only have 50% of the company, Christopher and Bobby have 40%, and Pamela has 10%, in order to sell the patent Pamela would need to agree with John Ross and Sue Ellen. Christopher ends up convincing Pamela, Sue Ellen, and John Ross to agree letting the methane car race to make the decision.

Gary Ewing (Ted Shackelford, whose character had been spun off into Knots Landing early in the original series' run) returns to Dallas to meet with Bobby. Gary tells Bobby that he and Valene have fallen on some tough times, and it has put a strain on their marriage. Gary reveals that he fell off the wagon, and Valene left him because of it. Gary tells Bobby that he hopes his plan works because he needs the money from the oil. Sue Ellen looks at it as an opportunity to seduce Gary into siding with her, John Ross, and J.R.

Christopher meets with Allison Jones, to talk about converting the city's fleet of vehicles from oil to methane. Jones tells Christopher that it will not be an easy sell to convince oil loving Texans to switch to natural gas. Christopher invites them all to the big race at Texas Motor Speedway which will feature his methane car racing against oil powered cars.

Emma is starting to feel the pressure from her father and grandmother more and more. Ryland and his mother continue to demonize Ann to Emma and try to make sure she has nothing to do with her. Ryland wants Emma to return to England to continue riding. The real reason of course is to hide Emma away from Anne yet again, continue their torture of her. Emma tells them that she would like to spend some time with her mother. Reluctantly, Ryland agrees.

John Ross gets a tip from Bum, J.R.'s PI, that one of the mechanics for Christopher's race car is a former convicted felon. John Ross approaches him and bribes him to sabotage the methane car so that it loses the race.

John Ross mentioned to J.R. that Sue Ellen is putting the moves on his little brother Gary. Jealousy getting the better of him, J.R. sends Sue Ellen a handful of letters that they had sent to each other while they were dating. Sue Ellen believes that J.R. is up to his old tricks and that he is simply just trying to manipulate her. Defiant, Sue Ellen tells John Ross that she is not going to let him do that to her. Among the old correspondences, is a new hand written letter by J.R. to Sue Ellen. There is no addresses on the envelope, it's simply says "Sue Ellen" in J.R.'s hand writing.

Everyone affiliated with Ewing Energies shows up for the race that Christopher's methane powered car is in. Sue Ellen continues to try to get closer to Gary. John Ross is convinced that Christopher's car will lose the race. Pamela is waiting to see which side she will take. The Dallas City Council is ready to see what methane can do, and Allison Jones tell Christopher IF the car wins, then the city council will side with him. Much to John Ross' disappointment, Christopher's car finish's the race first, and required the fewest pit stops for refueling. As promised, Pamela and Sue Ellen side with Bobby and Christopher bring the total to 75% in support of Christopher. Also, plans to begin pumping on the Henderson field to pump from Southfork begins again.

Ryland's mother goes to get Emma from her bedroom, but no one is in her room and Emma's clothes are all packed. Ryland and his mother have a heated argument in which she accuses him of pushing Emma in to Ann's arms. When she asked what he ever saw in Ann, he replies: "I loved her because she wasn't YOU".

When Bobby and Ann returned to Southfork after the race, they see Emma sitting in front of the house. She asks Ann and Bobby if she can live on the ranch for a while. Bobby and Ann agree and they all go inside.

Defeated, John Ross sits in the dark at Ewing Energies in the conference room drinking scotch. John Ross gets a phone call from J.R., asking for news about the race. John Ross tell him that Christopher won the race, and he does not want to be lectured. He claims that there could still be a scam to be pulled on Allison Jones at the DTC, which pleases J.R. J.R. tells John Ross not to worry about anything, and that he has a plan, and it will be his "Masterpiece". Also that John Ross should not have to pay for his (J.R.'s) sins. J.R. then tells John Ross, "Just remember, I'm proud of you. You're my son, from tip to tail". John Ross is happy to hear his father say that to him. Before anything else can be said, John Ross hears two gunshots over the phone ring out. Scared he calls out to J.R., and then yells out, "DAD!"

=== Continuity ===
Ted Shackelford reprises his role as Gary Ewing in this episode. He last appeared in the original Dallas series finale "Conundrum" in 1991.

== Trivia ==
The title is a reference to The Fast and the Furious movies, in which Jordana Brewster starred in.

== Production ==
Larry Hagman appeared in six of the fifteen episodes slated for the season before his death. The plot of the season had to be retooled in order to compensate for the character's absence.

== Larry Hagman's appearance ==
Larry Hagman passed away from leukemia before filming began for "The Furious and the Fast." Hagman's appearance as J.R. Ewing was compiled from repurposed unreleased footage filmed throughout seasons 1 and 2, similar to the previous episode "Blame Game." This was also not the first time J.R.'s absence from the show had to be written in; Cynthia Cidre's original pilot included J.R. in a relatively important role to the series, but due to contractual disputes between Hagman and TNT, she was made to rewrite the script that utilized archive footage of the titular character, as well as reducing characters Sue Ellen Ewing and Bobby Ewing to recurring characters.
