= Michelle Stevens =

Michelle Stevens Beaumont
- Dallas character
- Kimberly Foster as Michelle Stevens
- Portrayed by: Kimberly Foster
- Duration: 1989–91
- First appearance: September 22, 1989; Phantom of the Oil Rig
- Last appearance: April 26, 1991; The Decline and Fall of the Ewing Empire
In-universe information
- Occupation: Owner of Ewing Oil (1991)
- Parents: Amy Thompson Stevens
- Siblings: April Stevens
- Spouse: James Beaumont (1991) (annulled); Cliff Barnes (1991)

Michelle Stevens is a fictional character who appeared in the last seasons of the popular American television series Dallas, played by Kimberly Foster, from 1989 to 1991.

== Character ==
Michelle Stevens was the scheming younger sister of April Stevens. In an interview for the Reading Eagle, Kimberly Foster described her character, saying that "Michelle doesn't have a limit on how far she'll go... she's very smart, devious, and conniving. She lies, too, but I think she still has some vulnerabilities. She is always trying to find out everyone else's businesses, but she has secrets going on with just about everybody, too. She has some pain in her heart. I think it's because she grew up in the shadow of her sister."

== Storyline ==
Michelle comes to Dallas envious of her rich older sister's lifestyle. She initially becomes entangled with Cliff Barnes and spies on him for J.R. Ewing. J.R. grows to dislike Michelle after she interferes with his marriage with Cally. When Michelle begins an affair with J.R.'s son, James Beaumont, J.R. arranges for Michelle to leave town.

Following April's death, Michelle returns to Dallas, bent on revenge. After inheriting April's wealth, she buys Ewing Oil from LeeAnn De La Vega, (played by Barbara Eden), and marries James Beaumont, much to J.R.'s displeasure. Michelle's marriage is short-lived, as she later learns that James is already married to someone else. After James tells her he's leaving town with his wife and child, Michelle sells half of Ewing Oil to Cliff Barnes, but he takes advantage of Michelle's drunken state and marries her in order to control all of Ewing Oil. Michelle is jailed for shooting and killing Hillary Taylor, the woman responsible for April's death. Michelle is released after J.R. persuades the district attorney's office to drop the charges. In exchange for his help, Michelle sells her half of Ewing Oil back to J.R., making him an equal business partner with Cliff.

After returning from jail, Michelle is last seen returning to Ray Krebbs' old ranch on Southfork Ranch, which she had purchased with the hope of starting a family home with James. Upon returning, she breaks down in tears since the house is empty.
