= Jenna Wade =

- Dallas character
- Portrayed by: Morgan Fairchild (1978); Francine Tacker (1980); Priscilla Presley (1983–88)
- Duration: 1978, 1980, 1983–88
- First appearance: October 7, 1978; Old Acquaintance
- Last appearance: May 13, 1988; The Fat Lady Singeth
- Created by: David Jacobs
In-universe information
- Occupation: Owner of Jenna's Boutique (1984–86); Waitress at Billy Bob's, Fort Worth, Texas (1983–84); Fashion Editor of High Life magazine (1980)
- Parents: Lucas Wade
- Spouse: Renaldo Marchetta (backstory; 1985); Ray Krebbs (1987–)
- Children: Charlotte "Charlie" Wade; Lucas Wade-Krebbs
- Stepchildren: Margaret Krebbs

Jenna Wade is a fictional character on the popular American television series Dallas, played, most notably, by Priscilla Presley from 1983 to 1988. Jenna was also briefly played by Morgan Fairchild in 1978 and Francine Tacker in 1980.

== Casting ==
The character of Jenna Wade was portrayed by Morgan Fairchild for one episode in 1978; Jenna was then portrayed by Francine Tacker for two episodes in 1980. When the character was brought back in 1983, the part was recast for the second time, this time with Jenna being portrayed by Priscilla Beaulieu Presley; she would be the third and final actress to portray the character. Before her debut, Priscilla Presley described the character: "Jenna is her own woman. She's extremely self-reliant, she has lived in Europe and has a child. Just like me. Except that she's a bit more sophisticated than me. She has a lot of integrity, she's totally honest. I like her. How could I help but identify with her?".

== Background ==
Jenna was Bobby Ewing's childhood sweetheart. Jenna's father, Lucas Wade, was an oilman and associate of Jock Ewing. Jenna lived on her father's ranch, which was about three miles from Southfork. Bobby would often ride over to visit her as a kid. Years before Bobby met Pam, Jenna was engaged to Bobby but ditched him at the altar when she ran off to Italy and married Italian count Renaldo Marchetta. Jenna subsequently gave birth to a daughter, Charlotte (nicknamed "Charlie") and, for years, she never revealed who was Charlie's biological father.

== Storylines ==
Jenna (portrayed by Morgan Fairchild) reappeared in Bobby's life in 1978 when her affair with Maynard Anderson, a married politician and business associate of Jock and J.R. Ewing, ended and she needed a friend to turn to. Jenna introduced Bobby to her daughter Charlie; Bobby was then led to believe that he is the girl's father - however, Jenna denied this when confronted by Pam. In 1980, Jenna (now portrayed by Francine Tacker) is still in Dallas and has an unexpected encounter with Bobby. They renew their friendship while Pam is away in Paris on business. During this brief time, Bobby is tempted to sleep with Jenna. Bobby and Jenna (now portrayed by Priscilla Beaulieu Presley) reconnected for a third time in 1983, and they began seeing each other after Bobby's marriage to Pam ended. Bobby's brother J.R. always liked Jenna and was very supportive of her relationship with Bobby. Bobby again wanted to know who had fathered Jenna's daughter Charlie. After seeing Charlie's birth certificate (which named Bobby as Charlie's legal father), Jenna confessed that Renaldo Marchetta was actually Charlie's biological father and that she had listed Bobby as the legal father in order to protect her legal interests in future disputes with Marchetta over Charlie. Nonetheless, Jenna and Bobby got engaged in 1984; she once again jilted him on their wedding day to remarry Marchetta, but this time it was against her will and under threat. The pair were tracked down to a hotel where Marchetta was found shot dead, with Jenna holding the gun. She was accused of Marchetta's murder, but this was eventually resolved, and she once again became engaged to Bobby. Bobby broke off this third engagement with Jenna after deciding that he wanted to marry his ex-wife, Pam.

During the "Dream Season", after Bobby had died, Jenna had a brief relationship with Bobby's cousin Jack Ewing, but this was cut short as Jenna became mentally unstable due to Bobby's death. Later, Jenna received counseling to help her accept Bobby's death; she also ended her differences with Pam.

After the end of the "Dream Season", Jenna discovered that she was pregnant with Bobby's child; however, Bobby was now engaged to Pam. During Bobby and Pam's second wedding, Bobby's half-brother Ray Krebbs mentioned that Jenna was pregnant with Bobby's child. This caused problems between Ray and Bobby, especially after Jenna and Charlie moved in with Ray. In 1987, Jenna gave birth to Bobby's son, Lucas, named after her father. Jenna later married Ray, who adopted Lucas and raised him with Jenna despite Bobby being the father. The next year, after problems with the now-teenaged Charlie, Jenna escorted Charlie to Europe to attend boarding school. After returning to Dallas, she and Ray decided to relocate permanently to Switzerland to be away from the drama of the Ewings.

== Dallas (2012 TV series) ==
Since Ray's return to Dallas, there has been no mention of Jenna, Charlie or Bobby's son, Lucas.
