= Cally Harper Ewing =

- Dallas character
- Portrayed by: Cathy Podewell
- Duration: 1988–91, 2013
- First appearance: November 11, 1988; The Call of the Wild
- Last appearance: March 11, 2013; J.R.'s Masterpiece
In-universe information
- Occupation: Waitress; Artist
- Siblings: Japhet Harper; Boaz Harper
- Spouse: J.R. Ewing (1988–91)
- Children: Unnamed son

Calpurnia Elizabeth "Cally" Harper Ewing is a fictional character in the popular American television series Dallas, played by Cathy Podewell from 1988 to 1991. Cally was the second wife of J.R. Ewing. Podewell reprised her role as Cally Harper for J.R.'s funeral episode in the second season of the new Dallas in 2013.

== Storylines ==
Cally is a waitress at a hotel in Haleyville, Arkansas. J.R. meets her while on a hunting trip with his brother Bobby (Patrick Duffy) and their sons. J.R. gets Cally into bed, but when J.R. is discovered by her crazed brothers, he is arrested and convicted of rape. After Cally's brothers break J.R. out of prison, Cally lies that she might be pregnant, and her brothers force J.R. into a shotgun wedding. J.R. eventually escapes from Haleyville and returns to Dallas, but Cally follows him. She intends to make their marriage work, but finds that J.R. wants nothing to do with her.

Seeking the help of J.R.'s first wife, Sue Ellen (Linda Gray), Cally tricks J.R. into renewing their wedding vows when she claims she is pregnant. J.R. discovers her ruse, but decides to remain married to her, because his son John Ross (Omri Katz) has become fond of her.

The marriage is short-lived. By the time Cally divorces J.R., she really is pregnant with his child. In an attempt to leave J.R., Cally lies that his son James (Sasha Mitchell) is the child's father, and J.R. allows Cally to leave Dallas. After discovering the child's true paternity, J.R. decides to track Cally down and finds that she has created a new life for herself in Florida with their child and her new boyfriend. Realizing how happy Cally is, J.R. decides to leave her in peace.

In the series finale "Conundrum", J.R. dreams of what life would have been like without him. In the dream, Cally is the victim of repeated abuse from a very aggressive husband until she shoots him and has to go to jail.

== Dallas (2012 TV series) ==
In 2013, J.R. dies (it is later revealed that he was dying of cancer and masterminded/staged what would be believed to be a homicide), and Cally returns to Dallas for the memorial. Sue Ellen, Mandy, and Cally remember their moments with J.R., and how attracted they all were to him. No mention is made of the son she had with J.R. in the original series.

== Reception ==
When reviewing the release of Dallas: The Complete Twelfth Season on DVD, Paul Mavis of DVD Talk said of the character and actress: "Lush Cathy Podewell is a real find here as the sweet, sexy, kindly Cally Harper Ewing (where's this talented actress now?), and she breathes new life into the tired rehash of plots and characterizations in this twelfth go-around of the long-running night-time soap. Podewell certainly has a way with Larry Hagman (he looks delighted with her company), and their scenes together have an authentic comedic zip".
