= Accidental Meeting (1994 film) =

- Genre: Thriller
- Written by: Christopher Horner; Pete Best
- Directed by: Michael Zinberg
- Starring: Linda Gray; Linda Purl
- Music by: Patrick Williams
- Country of origin: United States
- Original language: English

Production
- Executive producer: Ed Milkovich
- Producer: Walter Klenhard
- Production location: San Diego
- Cinematography: Michael W. Watkins
- Editors: Robert L. Sinise; David L. Bertman
- Running time: 92 minutes
- Production companies: Paramount Television; Wilshire Court Productions

Original release
- Network: USA Network
- Release: March 17, 1994

Accidental Meeting is a 1994 American made-for-television thriller film directed by Michael Zinberg, and starring Linda Gray and Linda Purl. The film was promoted as 'the female version of Strangers on a Train (1951). The film premiered on USA Network on March 17, 1994.

== Plot ==
Jennifer's husband is committing adultery. Maryanne's boss treats her like dirt. After an accidental meeting, the women decide to kill each other's men. Jennifer goes through with the deal, but Maryanne backs out. Jennifer, enraged, will not rest until Maryanne lives up to her part of the deal.

== Cast ==
- Linda Gray as Jennifer Parris
- Linda Purl as Maryanne Bellmann
- Leigh McCloskey as Richard
- Ernie Lively as Obrenski
- David Hayward as Jonathan Holtman
- Kent McCord as Jack Parris
- Lorna Scott as Lynn
- Nancy Hochman as Julie
- Bethany Richards as Zoe
- Steve Tom as Hallman
- Duke Stroud as Palmer
