= Moment of Truth: Why My Daughter? =

- Promotional advertisement
- Genre: Drama
- Written by: Liz Coe
- Directed by: Chuck Bowman
- Starring: Linda Gray; Jamie Luner
- Theme music composer: Bruce Babcock
- Country of origin: United States
- Original language: English

Production
- Executive producer: Lawrence Horowitz
- Production location: Portland, Oregon
- Cinematography: Michael Hofstein
- Running time: 96 minutes
- Production company: O'Hara-Horowitz Productions

Original release
- Network: NBC
- Release: April 28, 1993

Moment of Truth: Why My Daughter? is a 1993 made-for-television drama film directed by Chuck Bowman. It is based on the true story of Diana Moffit, a teenage girl lured into prostitution, and the efforts of her mother, Gayle Moffit, to convict the man responsible for Diana's death. The film is a part of the Moment of Truth franchise and premiered on NBC on April 28, 1993.

== Plot ==
Set in the 1980s, the story focuses on Diana Moffitt, a likable 17-year-old from Portland, Oregon. Trouble starts when her parents decide to file for divorce, as well as being dumped by her boyfriend Brian. She takes it very hard and begins a relationship with a 23-year-old man named A.J. Treace, even though her mother, Gayle, senses that A.J. is bad news. As it turns out, he is a pimp who abuses Diana and lures her into the world of prostitution, which results in her dropping out of school, quitting her job, shutting her former best friend, Laurie, out of her life, and estrangement from her family. Gayle is devastated by this news and even goes as far as confronting Diana in a strip club where she is working. Desperate to save her daughter, she often confronts her and starts looking for ways to do something about it. Diana sometimes shows interest in her old life, but has trouble breaking out of the dark world she is living in. Finally, Diana disassociates herself from A.J. after a violent confrontation and returns home with her mother, even agreeing to press charges against him, but later drops the charges after A.J. talks her out of it and promises to change.

Diana is eventually mysteriously murdered, much to the distress of Gayle, who strongly feels that A.J. is responsible. Determined to get him behind bars, she notifies the police, who put her in contact with Sgt. Jack Powell, but they are initially unable to charge A.J. because he claims to have played no part in Diana's death, even though Gayle knows the truth. Looking for another related charge, she meets April, another one of A.J.'s prostitutes, who was also a friend of Diana's from the strip club that they once worked at. After gaining April's trust, Gayle begins to get information from her which could enable her to successfully charge A.J. with the murder of her daughter.

Eventually, A.J. is arrested by Jack on charges of racketeering and promoting prostitution, and despite once again pleading ignorance, Jack is able to make the charges stick, and A.J. is found guilty in his subsequent trial.

The film's epilogue reveals that A.J. was sentenced to 17 years for his crimes, as well as the fact that Diana's murder was never officially solved.

== Cast ==
- Linda Gray as Gayle Moffitt
- Jamie Luner as Diana Moffitt
- Lisa Sigell as Laurie
- Michael Lucas as Brian
- James Eckhouse as Sergeant Jack Powell
- Alanna Ubach as April
- Gretchen Corbett as Mrs. Hill
- Antonio Sabàto, Jr. as A.J. Treece
- Andrea White as Randi
- Joseph Burke as Harry Moffitt
- Louis A. Lotoroto as Paul Moffitt

== Production ==
The movie received generally negative reviews, being called 'melodramatic', 'formulaic' and with 'weak performances'.

Filming took place in Portland, Oregon.

Linda Gray accepted the lead role because she saw it as an opportunity to "educate other women". The real Gayle Moffit was on the set during production, but Gray decided not to talk with her, because she wanted to act out of her own maternal instincts.

For Antonio Sabàto, Jr., who landed the role because of his sex appeal, the movie marked his first appearance on primetime television.
