= Branch water =

Water from a natural stream or any plain water

Branch water, also called branch, is an American English term, primarily used in the southern United States, for water from a natural stream; it may also refer to any plain water, such as tap water, when added to a mixed drink, in contrast to soda water. For example, "bourbon and branch" refers to bourbon whiskey with water. This water may have been naturally limestone-filtered by passing through underground limestone, which removes iron. It is a traditional ingredient in the distillation of Kentucky bourbon.
