= Carter McKay =

- Dallas character
- Portrayed by: George Kennedy
- Duration: 1988–91, 1996, 1998
- First appearance: October 28, 1988 "Carousel"
- Last appearance: April 24, 1998; Dallas: War of the Ewings
- Created by: Leonard Katzman
- Spin-off appearances: Dallas: J.R. Returns; Dallas: War of the Ewings
In-universe information
- Occupation: CEO of WestStar Oil (1989–)
- Spouse: Rose Daniels McKay
- Sons: Tommy McKay
- Daughters: Tracey Lawton (McKay)
- Grandsons: Hunter McKay; Tripp McKay

Carter McKay is a fictional character that appeared in the later seasons of the popular American television series Dallas, played by George Kennedy from 1988 to 1991. The character reappeared in the reunion movies Dallas: J.R. Returns (1996) and Dallas: War of the Ewings (1998), again played by Kennedy.

== Storylines ==
=== Original series ===
Carter McKay, a rancher from Colorado, arrives in Dallas and buys Ray Krebbs's ranch, where he lives with his much younger wife, Rose (Jeri Gaile). Carter quickly makes enemies of the Ewing family when, during a severe drought, he dams up the river that runs through Southfork, claiming he cannot afford to import water for his livestock, whereas the Ewings can. When Miss Ellie has Clayton, Bobby and Ray blow up the dam, Carter hires mercenaries to protect himself and to scare the Ewings off. Meanwhile, Carter tries to find his daughter, who is coincidentally Bobby's new romance, Tracey Lawton (Beth Toussaint). Tracey wants nothing to do with her father, but he persists and heals the rift between them. The range war continues as Carter's right-hand man Fred Hughes almost shoots Bobby's son Christopher in an ambush by helicopter. The Ewings manage to cripple Carter's defenses and confront him, and Carter shoots Fred for trying to shoot Bobby. Carter explains to Bobby that he is fronting the range war for Jeremy Wendell, Head of WestStar, who has promised to get Carter's son Tommy (J. Eddie Peck) out of a South American prison. Jeremy wants to force the Ewings into selling him Section 40 of their land, which contains a large amount of oil. With pressure from Jeremy to complete their deal, Carter threatens the Ewings with more violence unless they sell the land to him. Miss Ellie agrees, but later during the deal meeting Jeremy confesses his master plan to the Ewings. However, the Ewings have arranged for detectives to record the meeting, and Jeremy is arrested. With Jeremy gone, Carter becomes Head of WestStar. During the final season, McKay is arrested, charged and convicted of the murder of Johnny Dancer. This results in him losing his position as chairman of the board of WestStar despite the fact that Cliff Barnes killed Dancer albeit in self defense. He obtains a copy of Cliff Barnes' confession and forces him to resign as National Energy Czar. He subsequently leaves Dallas and sells his ranch, but after reuniting with wife, Rose, he returns to drive J.R. Ewing out of the oil business. He manages to swindle J.R. into losing control of both Ewing Oil and WestStar to Cliff and himself, respectively. The series ends with J.R. drunkenly considering suicide.

=== Reunion films ===
In Dallas: J.R. Returns (1996), J.R. returns to Dallas having been in Europe for the past five years. Carter and Cliff are still at their respective companies but Cliff now wants out of the oil business. Carter plans to buy Ewing Oil and incorporate it into WestStar. This news is the impetus for a plan that ultimately puts Ewing Oil in Bobby's hands and sets J.R. in charge of WestStar.

Two years later in Dallas: War of the Ewings (1998), J.R. attempts to take back Ewing Oil as well, but Bobby and his new partner Sue Ellen refuse his offers. Carter seeks to make a deal with Ewing Oil, claiming he knows of a huge untapped oil source. The oil turns out to be located under Ray's ranch, and Carter and J.R. both scramble to claim it. Carter overpays for the land, knowing he will make the money back, but soon learns that the Ewing family owns exclusive drilling rights on the land. McKay can never profit from oil drilled on the land and only owns the property.

=== 2012 revival ===
Carter was still alive in 2014. His grandson Hunter, Tommy's son, is a video game millionaire; he has known John Ross Ewing since childhood, and still holds a grudge against the Ewings. He makes a secret deal with Nicolas Treviño to take control of Ewing Global, laughing at John Ross that Carter had tricked J.R. the same way. Meanwhile, Bobby seeks out Tracey (now Melinda Clarke) to get her help in negotiating a resolution with her nephew. But Hunter is unaware that Nicolas works for a Mexican drug cartel, and when the deal is done, they murder Hunter and make it look like suicide.

In "Victims of Love", Tracey mentioned that Tommy's girlfriend turned up several years after his death with Hunter and his brother Trip.
