= James Beaumont (Dallas) =

Fictional character in the American television series "Dallas"

James Richard Beaumont I
- Dallas character
- Portrayed by: Sasha Mitchell
- Duration: 1989–91
- First appearance: October 13, 1989; Sunset, Sunrise
- Last appearance: April 19, 1991; Some Leave, Some Get Carried Out
- Created by: David Jacobs
In-universe information
- Occupation: Ewing Oil associate
- Family: Ewing
- Father: J. R. Ewing
- Mother: Vanessa Beaumont
- Stepfather: Allister Sergej Brumin
- Stepmother: Sue Ellen Ewing; Cally Ewing
- Half-brothers: John Ross Ewing III from J.R. and Sue Ellen; Unnamed son from J. R. and Cally
- Half-sisters: Unnamed daughter from J.R. and Leanne Rees
- Wife: Debra Lynn Beaumont (unknown dates); Michelle Stevens (1991; annulled)
- Sons: James Richard "Jimmy" Beaumont II
- Grandparents: Jock Ewing; Miss Ellie Ewing; Clayton Farlow (step-grandfather)
- Aunts and uncles: Gary Ewing; Valene Ewing; Abby Ewing; Bobby Ewing; Pam Ewing; April Ewing; Ann Ewing; Ray Krebbs; Donna Krebbs; Jenna Krebbs
- First cousins: Lucy Ewing; Christopher Ewing (adoptive); Bobby Ewing II; Betsy Ewing; Molly Whittaker; Lucas Wade-Krebbs (biological cousin and adoptive half-cousin); Margaret Krebbs (half-cousin)

James Richard Beaumont is a fictional character that appeared in the later seasons of the popular American television series Dallas, played by Sasha Mitchell.

== Background ==
James Beaumont was J.R. Ewing's son from his affair with Vanessa Beaumont in Vienna; he was born in 1967. James was raised in Europe with his mother and her husband who he believed to be his father until his mother told him that his true father was Texas oil baron J.R. Ewing.

== Storylines ==
James came to Dallas to seek out the father he never knew he had. James shocked everyone when he announced that he was J.R.'s son at a public family dinner with all of the Ewings present. J.R. embraced James as his son but James proved to be as manipulative as J.R. himself. James resented his father's interference in his life from controlling James' business dealings and to attempting to break up James' relationship with Michelle Stevens. Seeking revenge on J.R., James conspired with J.R.'s wife, Cally and blocked J.R.'s release from a sanitarium.

James eventually married Michelle, but he later learned that his first marriage to Debra Lynn was never dissolved. Further, Debra Lynn had his child, James Richard Beaumont, Jr. (nicknamed "Jimmy"). James decided to stay married to Debra Lynn and annulled his marriage to Michelle. However, he ended up moving back east with Debra Lynn and Jimmy to escape the control of J.R.
