= Dallas: J.R. Returns =

- UK VHS cover
- Genre: Drama
- Based on: Characters created by David Jacobs
- Written by: Arthur Bernard Lewis
- Screenplay by: Leonard Katzman
- Directed by: Leonard Katzman
- Starring: Rosalind Allen; Christopher Demetral; Patrick Duffy; Linda Gray; Larry Hagman; Omri Katz; Deborah Kellner; George Kennedy; Ken Kercheval; Audrey Landers; Tracy Scoggins
- Theme music composer: Jerrold Immel
- Country of origin: United States
- Original language: English

Production
- Executive producers: Lee Rich; Leonard Katzman; Rich Heller
- Production locations: 901 Main St, Dallas, Texas; Calder House - 4800 Park Lane, Dallas, Texas; Hyatt Regency Hotel - 300 Reunion Boulevard, Dallas, Texas; Southfork Ranch, 3700 Hogge Drive, Parker, Texas
- Cinematography: Don Reddy
- Editor: Fred W. Berger
- Running time: 90 minutes
- Production companies: Warner Bros. Television; Eagle Point Production; Olive Productions

Original release
- Network: CBS
- Release: November 15, 1996

Related
- Dallas; Dallas: War of the Ewings

Dallas: J.R. Returns is a 1996 American made-for-television drama film and is the first of two Dallas reunion films, produced after the series went off the air in 1991. It originally aired on CBS on November 15, 1996, and was rerun as part of TV Land's salute to 50 years of Warner Bros. Television. The film is the second installment of the Dallas film series, following Dallas: The Early Years (1986).

== Plot summary ==
The film begins with an American Airlines flight landing in Dallas. Aboard the plane is J.R., who is returning home after spending the previous five years living in Europe. The last time he had been seen in Texas, J.R. was in the throes of a catastrophic downfall that cost him everything that was near and dear to him, including control of his family's company Ewing Oil and being disowned by his progeny, son John Ross (Omri Katz). In the years that have passed, however, J.R. has become rejuvenated and wants to return to the oil business.

Meanwhile, Bobby Ewing (Patrick Duffy) lives at Southfork Ranch alone with his son Christopher (Christopher Demetral). After Cliff Barnes (Ken Kercheval) took over Ewing Oil, Bobby was given the deed to Southfork after Miss Ellie Ewing and Clayton Farlow opted to retire to travel. Having been out of the oil business for some time, Bobby is considering selling the ranch.

Cliff, meanwhile, is also looking for a way out of the business. Although he won the ultimate victory over the Ewing family, Cliff has grown more and more frustrated over the amount of time that running the oil company has taken from him. He desires to spend more time with his family, especially his wife Afton Cooper and his recently discovered daughter Pamela Rebecca, and has been in what he thought were secret talks with Carter McKay (George Kennedy) to merge Ewing Oil and WestStar Oil. J.R., however, pays a surprise visit to Cliff's office and tells him he intends to enter the bidding war.

In order to do this, J.R. is going to need financial backing and after Bobby refuses to go along with him, he enlists the assistance of his former assistant Sly Lovegren (Deborah Rennard), Ewing family attorney Harv Smithfield (George O. Petrie), and Harv's daughter and business partner Anita (Tracy Scoggins) to try and find some way to get enough money to buy back into the business.

In her search, Anita discovers a previously unknown stock portfolio belonging to John Ross. Prior to his death, Jock Ewing had bought five thousand shares of a technology company named Cyberbyte and had placed them in a trust for his grandson. As it happens, John Ross' eighteenth birthday is approaching and J.R. figures that the trust will become his son's to do as he wishes shortly. However, Jock added a condition to the terms of the trust; John Ross is only to receive his portfolio once his father is dead, so as to prevent J.R. from potentially pulling one of his usual tricks to access the money.

That does not stop J.R. from trying, though, especially once he discovers that the current value of the portfolio is $200 million; since this would be enable him to buy the majority stake of WestStar Oil and freeze McKay out of any merger with Ewing Oil, J.R. crafts a plan to where his attorney will transfer the portfolio to him. He would then sell the stock, purchase the controlling stake in WestStar, then buy the Cyberbyte shares again and put them back into the portfolio which would then be placed back under John Ross' name. To cover his tracks, he would claim an accidental oversight if he was caught.

J.R.'s plan also includes faking his own death, which brings John Ross and his mother, J.R.'s embattled ex-wife Sue Ellen (Linda Gray) back to Dallas for the funeral. Eventually J.R. reveals his ruse to everyone, including an angry Cliff and a disgusted Sly, the latter of whom resigns as his personal assistant.

When the entire plan is complete, J.R. is the majority shareholder in WestStar, and he uses that clout to force McKay to back out of buying Ewing Oil. After being sent a letter notifying him of his daughter's whereabouts, Cliff decided that finding his family is more important than beating J.R., but Bobby figured out a way that Cliff can have both, and he bought Ewing Oil. Bobby later realizes that he was tricked back into the oil business by J.R., who knew getting Bobby off Southfork would force him not to sell. J.R. maneuvered the board to remove McKay as Chairman of WestStar and for himself to take his place.

An unhappy Bobby sells half of the company to his new partner, Sue Ellen. A drunken and bitter Sly (Deborah Rennard) had tipped off Sue Ellen that J.R. faked his own death. Sue Ellen suspected this all along and felt that J.R needed to be taught a lesson. Cliff, meanwhile, greets Afton and their daughter Pamela (Deborah Kellner) outside the sanitarium, and they leave to be a family.

In the last scene, John Ross asks J.R. why he is smiling even though he lost Ewing Oil to Bobby and Sue Ellen. J.R. points out that Bobby is back in the oil business and is no longer going to sell Southfork. Sue Ellen is back at Southfork to stay, and John Ross will remain in Dallas to learn the oil business from J.R. John Ross realizes that his father planned everything to work out this way. J.R.'s last words are, "You see, John Ross? You're learning already."

=== Series finale cliffhanger resolution ===
During the scene where J.R. reunites with Bobby, the latter mentions how he found his brother at the end of the final episode of the original series, which had ended on a freeze frame of Bobby saying "oh, my God" after J.R. had fired a gunshot in his bedroom. Bobby reveals that J.R. had blown a hole in a mirror in a drunken stupor, babbling on about how the devil was looking back at him. The next morning, J.R. was gone from Dallas and the two had barely spoken in the ensuing years.

== Ratings ==
Dallas: J.R. Returns was a ratings success for the CBS Network, and ranked 14th place for the week it was shown, with a 13.4 rating. Its success prompted Warner Bros. to produce a reunion miniseries for the Dallas spin-off series Knots Landing (entitled Knots Landing: Back to the Cul-de-Sac) in 1997. A second Dallas TV movie, War of the Ewings, was produced in 1998.

== Continuity ==
As with War of the Ewings (1998), the events depicted in J.R. Returns are ignored for the revival series, which premiered on TNT in 2012.

== Cast ==
Starring in alphabetical order

- Rosalind Allen as Julia Cunningham
- Christopher Demetral as Christopher Ewing
- Patrick Duffy as Bobby Ewing
- Linda Gray as Sue Ellen Ewing
- Larry Hagman as J.R. Ewing
- Omri Katz as John Ross Ewing III
- Deborah Kellner as Pamela Rebecca Cooper
- George Kennedy as Carter McKay
- Ken Kercheval as Cliff Barnes
- Audrey Landers as Afton Cooper
- Tracy Scoggins as Anita Smithfield

Guest Stars

- Deborah Rennard as Sly Lovegren
- Buck Taylor as Steve Grisham
- George O. Petrie as Harv Smithfield

== DVD release ==
Warner Home Video released Dallas: J.R. Returns on DVD April 12, 2011 as part of the Dallas: The Movie Collection 2-disc set. It was only available as a region 1 set.
