= Sue Ellen Ewing =

Fictional character in Dallas

- Dallas character
- Portrayed by: Linda Gray
- Duration: 1978–1989, 1991, 1996, 1998, 2012–2014
- First appearance: April 2, 1978 "Digger's Daughter"
- Last appearance: September 22, 2014 "Brave New World"
- Created by: David Jacobs
- Spin-off appearances: Dallas: J.R. Returns; Dallas: War of the Ewings
In-universe information
- Other names: Sue Ellen Shepard; Sue Ellen Lockwood
- Occupation: Partner in Ewing Global (2013–2014); Founder and Executive Director of the Sue Ellen Ewing Foundation (2009–2012); CEO of Ewing Oil (1998–2009); Co-CEO of Ewing Oil (1996–1998); Anonymous Film Producer (1989); Owner of Valentine Lingerie (1986–1988)
- Mother: Patricia Shepard
- Sisters: Kristin Shepard
- Husband: J.R. Ewing (1971–1981, 1982–1988); Don Lockwood (1990–1996)
- Sons: John Ross Ewing III
- Nephews: Christopher Ewing

Sue Ellen Ewing is a fictional character and one of the female leads in the CBS primetime soap opera Dallas. Sue Ellen was portrayed by Linda Gray and appeared on the show since its pilot episode, first broadcast on April 2, 1978. Dallas followed the trials of the wealthy Ewing family in the city of Dallas, Texas, into which Sue Ellen married when she wed J.R. Ewing. Gray played Sue Ellen until the twelfth season of Dallas, when her character finally leaves Texas after beating J.R. at his own game in the 1989 episode "Reel Life". Gray returned for the 1991 series finale "Conundrum" and the subsequent Dallas telemovies (J.R. Returns in 1996 and War of the Ewings in 1998). She reprised the role for the 2012 continuation series of Dallas, which ran until 2014.

Sue Ellen's storylines in season 2 focused on the character's bout with alcohol and her slowly deteriorating relationship with her husband. The final episode of the season focused on the birth of her son with J.R., John Ross Ewing III. While her relationship with J.R. is not always harmonious, it is a significant aspect of her overall character. As the series progressed, Sue Ellen came into her own as an individual character. The actress has said of her character's personality, "I never wanted her to be boring. She was never boring before – she started out kind of boring, but I think that's the kiss of death because people will expect her to be interesting." Gray later described Sue Ellen as being "one of the most interesting characters on TV in the 1980s. She was the original Desperate Housewife. She led the way for all those girls."

For her work as Sue Ellen, Gray was nominated for a Primetime Emmy Award in the category "Best Actress in a Drama Series" in 1981 (Barbara Bel Geddes who played Miss Ellie Ewing was also nominated in that category for Dallas that year). Gray was also nominated for a Golden Globe Award in both 1980 and 1981 in the category of "Best Performance by an Actress in a Television Series – Drama" respectively. In 2010, TNT (sister company to Warner Bros. Television, the current copyright owners of the series) announced they were producing a new, updated Dallas series. It was a continuation of the original series and primarily centered around Sue Ellen and J.R.'s son John Ross Ewing III, and Bobby and Pamela's son Christopher Ewing, though various stars of the original series reprised their roles. Gray agreed to return to the new series and once again assumed the role of Sue Ellen.

== Character portrayal and development ==
=== Casting and creation ===
When Gray originally tested for Dallas, the role of Sue Ellen was merely that of a background character. The actress recounts that the part was a "mere walk-on" and there hadn't been any need for a formal audition. In fact, Gray had to do an impromptu audition over the telephone because the role was not considered important enough to bring in another actor to test for the part, though the actress later stated that Newhart innkeeper Mary Frann was also considered to play the character while the producers were casting the show. In an interview with TV Guide, Gray confirmed: "She [Frann] had the part. Victoria Principal was a brunette, and so was I, and Mary was a blonde, and [the producers] wanted that [visual] contrast. But the casting director [who had only recently tapped me to play a transsexual on All That Glitters] kept bugging them until they finally said, 'OK, we'll read her.'" Once the show was picked up for a full season, Gray and fellow actor Steve Kanaly (Ray Krebbs) were both upgraded to starring roles.

After staying with the show for eight seasons, Gray ran into trouble when she requested the producers of the show to adjust her contract to allow her to direct, as did the contracts of male co-stars Duffy and Hagman. The request initially led to producers firing the actress from the series, though the decision was later reversed when Dallas star Larry Hagman threatened to quit the show unless Gray were rehired. Gray stated in an interview with TV Guide, "The producers said, 'But you're doing so well.' I thought, 'Oh, look out! I'm on the warpath now.' It was a struggle, though, because it was a man's show. And they fired me. When I finally told Larry, he went with me into the office and said, 'If she doesn't come back, I don't come back. I can't be playing J.R. Ewing without Sue Ellen.' He was very loyal and, honestly, a very smart businessman. He knew that truly, it was a huge relationship to the show."

The actress also recounted the story to Alan Mercer of Dazzling Diva.com, saying: "I told them I don't want any more money. I just want to direct one episode in the next two year cycle. I didn't think that was so horrible. I didn't want to direct six episodes. They still said no. Basically, I was fired at the end of year eight. So, I said good-bye and Larry said, 'See you next season.' I told him I won't be coming back. He said, 'What!?!' I told him, 'They fired me because I want to direct one episode, and if that's their stance, I'm out of here.' He was stunned and he said, 'If you go, I go.' He denies that to this day. He really went to bat for me." Gray remained a member of the principal cast until she left the show in its 12th season. Her departure came as a surprise, but her publicist said that after eleven years on the show, she wished to pursue other things.

In 2010, TNT (sister company to Warner Bros. Television, the current copyright owners of the series) announced they were producing a continuation of Dallas. The new series primarily centered around Sue Ellen and J.R.'s son John Ross Ewing III, and Bobby Ewing's adopted son Christopher Ewing, though various stars of the original series reprised their roles. Gray agreed to return to the new series, once again to play Sue Ellen.

=== Characterization ===
Linda Gray as Sue Ellen in the fifth season of the series.

In 1979, Gray spoke with TV Guide (Canada) and recounted: "At first, they had no idea what to do with the part. Sue Ellen's lines ran to 'More coffee, darling?' and 'I have a headache.' Victoria Principal and Patrick Duffy were the goody-goodies. Jim Davis and Barbara Bel Geddes were parental. Hagman was the villain. And I was the redhead on the couch." However, Gray was upgraded to a starring role once Dallas was picked up for a full season following the five episode arc miniseries. The actress later stated that on-screen husband Larry Hagman had criticized one of her performances early on during the start of the series, and called it "terrible", though he denied it. She joked, "I'm sorry. He said it to me loud and clear, and made me feel terrible, and it started one of our first fights on the way back [to the motel where everyone was staying]. I swear to you—he devastated me. Then, years later, he said, 'Oh, I didn't mean that.' I could have killed him!"

Throughout the series, Sue Ellen often suffered emotional abuse and adultery from her husband J.R., who was the primary antagonist of the show. Linda Gray described Sue Ellen as being, "one of the most interesting characters on TV in the 1980s. She was the original Desperate Housewife. She led the way for all those girls." She also added, "The more successful we became, the more glamorous and fashionable the clothes became. We set fashion trends in the 80s. Those shoulder pads did get a bit wild. They had to make doors bigger in the end." In an interview with The Telegraph, she said: "It was kind of exciting. I played this neurotic, psychotic, alcoholic weirdo. But I still say she was the most interesting female on television in the eighties." The character of Sue Ellen has gone through an addiction to alcohol, which she returned to every time something went extremely wrong with her life. Gray was particularly fond of doing these scenes. She commented,

I loved my drunk scenes. I know that may sound very strange to people! I got to just let go and just do a down and dirty version of Sue Ellen. It was like, 'Just let me at it and roll those cameras'. I remember being in makeup for 20 minutes, which normally took two hours. They put some kind of gel in my hair and some very light makeup and I loved it. I said, "Just let me go, please don't edit me, just let me go.'" She added, "It was just one of those charming, charming, charming times where I just got to blow it out. I just wanted Sue Ellen to be raw unlike any other time in her life, where she was the victim and she was this and she was that; J.R. Ewing would do something and she would react, he would do something and she would have an affair or drink or whatever. This was just like, 'Let me go. Let Sue Ellen out of that box'

In a 2011 interview with Digital Spy, Gray said of her character's persona:

I never wanted her to be boring. She was never boring before–she started out kind of boring, but I think that's the kiss of death because people will expect her to be interesting. By interesting, that doesn't mean she's drunk. I had to do a lot of thinking about what we would do with her. Where would she be now? I did a lot of homework finding out where she would be and what Texas women are like now. What has she gone through in her life? What has she come to grips with? What does she like about herself? What doesn't she like about herself? What kind of impact is she going to make on her life, on John Ross's life, on her future? Who is she?

== Character arc ==
=== Original series ===
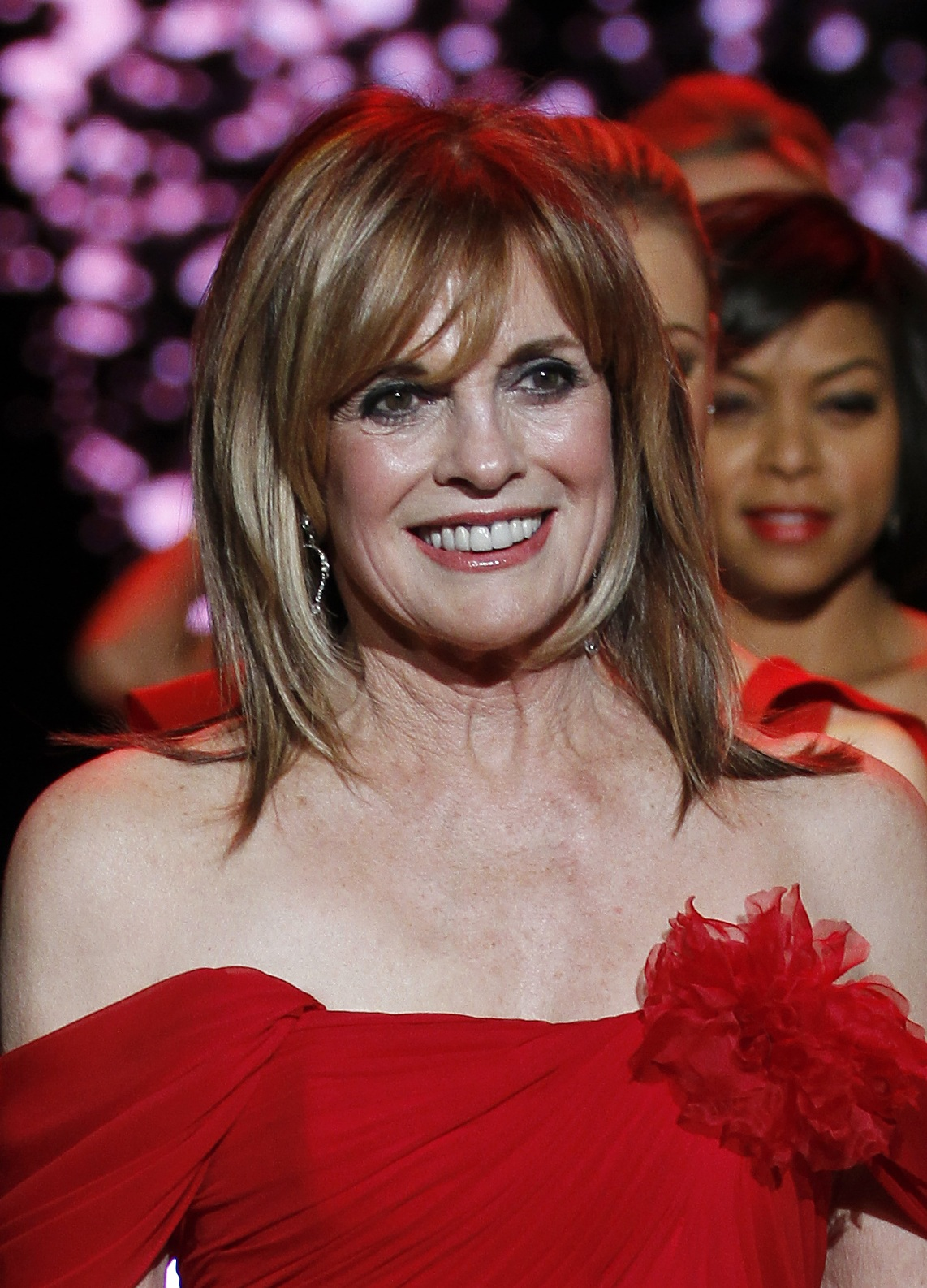
Linda Gray has said that she considers Sue Ellen "one of the most interesting female characters on television in the 1980s".

When the 20-year-old Sue Ellen Shepard wins the title of Miss Texas in 1967, she meets her future husband, J.R. Ewing (Larry Hagman), who is a judge for the pageant. After a courtship, they marry in 1971, but after several years, their marriage deteriorates, due in large part to J.R.'s numerous extramarital affairs and his growing disinterest in her. In 1978, a lonely Sue Ellen begins an affair with J.R.'s nemesis, Cliff Barnes (Ken Kercheval). Shortly thereafter, Sue Ellen finds herself pregnant and believes that Cliff is the father because she and J.R. had been married for years without conceiving, and by this point, they barely had marital relations. Sue Ellen believes she loves Cliff, but is unable to leave J.R. To console herself, she starts drinking heavily during her pregnancy. Worried about the safety of her unborn child, J.R. has Sue Ellen committed to a sanitarium in 1979, to gain sobriety. However, Sue Ellen manages to continue drinking and escapes from the sanitarium drunk and crashes a car. While in the hospital, she gives birth to a son, John Ross Ewing III. After her son's birth, Sue Ellen becomes severely depressed and shows no interest in the child.

She then begins an affair with rodeo cowboy Dusty Farlow (Jared Martin) and enters into psychiatric treatment. Eventually, she gains the strength to connect with her child. After Cliff sues for paternity of the baby, tests reveal that J.R. is in fact the biological father. Sue Ellen, meanwhile, makes plans to leave J.R. for Dusty; however, Dusty is reportedly killed in a plane crash, and this news sends Sue Ellen back to the bottle. In 1981, Sue Ellen learns that Dusty is in fact alive but has been horribly crippled as a result of the plane crash. Nonetheless, Sue Ellen remains dedicated to her love for him and leaves J.R., taking their son with her to live at the Southern Cross Ranch, the home of Dusty's father, Clayton Farlow (Howard Keel). Sue Ellen divorces J.R. and gains custody of John Ross, but her relationship with Dusty ends when he regains the use of his legs and decides to resume his life's passion as a rodeo cowboy.

Sue Ellen then moves back to Dallas with her son and enters into another short-lived romance with Cliff. When J.R. gets wind of this, he becomes jealous and courts Sue Ellen himself in an effort to win back custody of his son, and, in the process, obtain his voting shares in Ewing Oil, the family oil company. In 1982, J.R. and Sue Ellen remarry, but their happiness is short-lived as J.R. quickly returns to his philandering ways and Sue Ellen catches him in bed with oil tycoon Holly Harwood (Lois Chiles). However, Sue Ellen decides to remain married to J.R., in name only, but moves out of his bedroom. In 1983, Sue Ellen enters into an affair with college student, Peter Richards (Christopher Atkins), who had been her son's camp counselor. In 1984, Sue Ellen miscarries a child, but doesn't know whether J.R. or Peter is the father. When J.R. learns of Sue Ellen's affair, he arranges for Peter to be arrested on trumped-up drug charges and blackmails him to leave Dallas for good.

In 1986, Sue Ellen goes into business by buying a partnership interest in a lingerie company. She successfully lures J.R.'s latest mistress, Mandy Winger (Deborah Shelton), away from J.R. by offering her a promising career as model and then as an actress. Sue Ellen and J.R. enjoy a brief reconciliation; however, J.R.'s desire to regain Ewing Oil by having an affair with Kimberly Cryder (Leigh Taylor-Young) destroys what is left of their marriage. Sue Ellen decides to leave J.R. for good, but he manages to take John Ross away and put him into hiding in a boarding school. Sue Ellen and her new lover, Nicholas Pearce (Jack Scalia), confront J.R. at his penthouse and demand he tell them where he hid John Ross. A scuffle breaks out between J.R. and Nicholas, which results in Nicholas' being thrown over the balcony and killed. In response, Sue Ellen shoots J.R. three times; however, he lives and neither she nor J.R. is indicted for any crimes.

In 1988, Sue Ellen divorces J.R. for a second time. Deciding to get revenge on him, she decides to make a feature film exposé on her life with J.R., with the help of screenwriter Don Lockwood (Ian McShane). She and Don soon become romantically involved and, in 1989, Sue Ellen moves to London with Lockwood, but not before blackmailing J.R. by threatening to release the film, which would destroy his reputation. In 1991, J.R. learns that Sue Ellen and Don Lockwood have married. John Ross, her son by J.R., later joins her and Don in London. Sue Ellen appears in the final episode of the series during J.R.'s dream in which she is a successful actress married to her previous love, Nicholas Pearce.

In 1996, when her marriage to Don is in trouble, Sue Ellen returns to Dallas with her son, after J.R. was reportedly killed in a car accident. When J.R. is discovered alive, Sue Ellen reconciles with him. However, upon learning that J.R. faked his death to manipulate his family, Sue Ellen becomes partners with Bobby in the family company, Ewing Oil, to spite J.R. In 1998, Sue Ellen becomes CEO of Ewing Oil.

=== Dallas (2012 TV series) ===
Sue Ellen has become a powerful woman in Dallas, leading successful fundraising campaigns and making connections with influential Texans. Her success has led her to run for Governor of Texas, with campaign backers already lining up to support her. But despite this success, Sue Ellen harbors deep regret for her mistakes as a mother raising John Ross and will do anything to make things right for him. Upon seeing J.R. for the first time in years, there is a brief moment of romantic tension and nostalgia. However, Sue Ellen becomes wary of J.R.'s claims of having changed when Cliff Barnes returns to town. Then when a colleague and occasional lover of John Ross's, Veronica Martinez, is pushed off a balcony and killed, Sue Ellen bribes the medical examiner into ruling the death a suicide and finds herself looking for support from Harris Ryland, Ann's ex-husband. Harris later plans to use Sue Ellen's sure win to his advantage and desiring to run a clean office, Sue Ellen seeks Ann's help who later gets a recording of Harris admitting to his crimes and placing him into a spot of submission.

In the second season, Harris again gains the upper hand when he offers Ann information about their kidnapped daughter in exchange for the tape, Sue Ellen tells Ann to go ahead. However, her secret bribery comes out on the eve of the election and she loses the election and twelve donors towards her foundation. Facing the possibility of jail and the overall humiliation and disgrace, she pours herself a glass of wine (in the original series, her favorite tipple was Vodka). Yet, before she can drink it J.R. and John Ross arrive, with J.R. vowing to make things right by her and reminding her that she is a strong woman. After they leave she dumps out the wine and instead seeks comfort in Ann. J.R. through means of blackmail is able to get the charges dropped and after thanking him, Sue Ellen invites him in for tea, a spark of their past romance being seemingly reignited. Later she comes to the aid of John Ross and helps him in securing control of the newly established Ewing Energies, by pushing his ex-girlfriend Elena Ramos out of the company. Despite pleas from Bobby, Ann, and Christopher she does so.

Then when J.R. is murdered, Sue Ellen becomes heart broken and relapses after his memorial service. She reads a letter he wrote to her and spends the night alone in his room. At his funeral, she reads the letter aloud in which J.R. declares his undying love to Sue Ellen and asks her for another chance. Heartbroken, Sue Ellen reveals her own unresolved feelings for J.R. and declares that had he not been murdered she would have happily reunited with him. She then collapses at his casket and says he was the love of her life.

Soon after, Sue Ellen's alcoholism returns, and her struggles with it become a recurring theme in the third season, putting a strain on her relationship with her son. Eventually she learns the truth about the circumstances surrounding J.R's death, and is angered at both Bobby and Bum that she had been kept in the dark about his illness and his final plan, although she makes amends.

== Reception ==
For her work as Sue Ellen, Gray was nominated for a Primetime Emmy Award in the category "Best Actress in a Drama Series" in 1981 (Barbara Bel Geddes who played Miss Ellie Ewing was also nominated in that category for Dallas that year). Gray was also nominated for a Golden Globe Award in both 1980 and 1981 in the category of "Best Performance by an Actress in a Television Series - Drama" respectively. The character of Sue Ellen was well received by television critics. The Biography Channel said, "Who could ever forget Dallas with the gin-swilling Sue Ellen Ewing, replete with shoulder pads long before Dynasty, staggering around Southfork Ranch with a permanently tearful expression as she suffered the brunt of J.R. Ewing's evil ways?" The Boulevard Magazine said,

It may be 2009 and seventeen years since the primetime drama Dallas went off the air, but memories of the Ewing family still linger. Corruption and betrayal, lies, greed, affairs and scandal – all were just part of another day at the Southfork Ranch. At the center of it all was one of our favorite Ewings, the person we couldn't help but root for each week as she drank and slept her way through one ordeal after another. This, of course, was the tortured and (sometimes) villainous Sue Ellen Shepard Ewing, former Texas beauty queen and trophy wife of the womanizing rogue J.R. Ewing, played to perfection by actress Linda Gray.

== Notes ==
- Curran, Barbara A. (2005). Dallas: The Complete Story of the World's Favorite Prime-Time Soap. Cumberland House Publishing. ISBN 978-1581824728.
