= Dallas: War of the Ewings =

- Genre: Drama
- Based on: Characters created by David Jacobs
- Written by: Arthur Bernard Lewis; Julie Sayres
- Story by: Arthur Bernard Lewis
- Directed by: Michael Preece
- Starring: Patrick Duffy; Linda Gray; Larry Hagman; Michelle Johnson; Steve Kanaly; George Kennedy; Tracy Scoggins
- Theme music composer: Jerrold Immel
- Country of origin: United States
- Original language: English

Production
- Executive producers: Larry Hagman; Patrick Duffy
- Producer: Elliot Friedgen
- Production locations: Dallas; Parker, Texas; Plano, Texas; Southfork Ranch, 3700 Hogge Drive, Parker, Texas
- Cinematography: Karl Kases
- Editor: Bud Friedgen
- Running time: 85 minutes
- Production companies: Warner Bros. Television; Lakeside Productions

Original release
- Network: CBS
- Release: April 24, 1998

Related
- Dallas: J.R. Returns; Dallas Reunion: The Return to Southfork

Dallas: War of the Ewings is a 1998 American made-for-television drama film and is the second of two Dallas reunion films, following on from the weekly series that ran from 1978 to 1991 and Dallas: J.R. Returns from 1996. It aired on CBS on April 24, 1998, two decades after the original series premiere. The film is the third and final installment of the Dallas film series.

== Plot summary ==
The opening scene is reminiscent of the shower scene with Bobby (Patrick Duffy) and Pamela Barnes Ewing from the original series, but with Sue Ellen Ewing (Linda Gray) entering and kissing Bobby. Again, this is a dream of J.R. Ewing's (Larry Hagman). Bobby and Sue Ellen now own Ewing Oil, and J.R., who seized control of WestStar Oil from Carter McKay (George Kennedy) in J.R. Returns, wants to regain the company. He applies for a loan to use in a hostile takeover but is declined because he doesn't have enough assets.

Oil is discovered on Ray Krebbs's (Steve Kanaly) ranch. J.R. tries to use it as collateral for his loan, unaware that the Krebbs ranch is in serious trouble. Ray has been living in Switzerland with his wife Jenna for several years but is crippled by debt and has mortgaged his ranch several times.

Unsuccessful at obtaining his loan, J.R. attempts to divide and conquer by destroying Bobby's and Sue Ellen's partnership. This tactic backfires when Sue Ellen tells him Carter McKay (who lost WestStar to J.R.), and his business associate Peter Ellington (Philip Anglim) have pitched a tip to Ewing Oil about a vast quantity of untapped oil.

J.R. enlists the help of Jennifer Jantzen (Michelle Johnson) of Jantzen Oil to con a sale for Ewing Oil out of Bobby. The plan backfires when she slips and reveals her knowledge of McKay.

J.R. narrowly escapes death twice. He hires a private detective to find out who is behind this and continues to plot his takeover of Ewing Oil. Jennifer Jantzen's conscience attacks, and she decides to start over with Bobby. The business and personal relationship between Sue Ellen and Bobby begins to crumble as Sue Ellen's aggressive ownership style clashes with his cautiousness and pragmatism.

McKay reveals to Sue Ellen that the oil reserves are under Ray's ranch, and that as of that business day, he and J.R. were in the running to bid on them. The day of the auction arrives, and McKay's associate Ellington takes Sue Ellen hostage at gunpoint. He demands that McKay win the bid for Ray's ranch. After bidding reaches $50 million, J.R. backs off, but not before revealing the hostage situation to Ray and Bobby, who save Sue Ellen. Ellington then reveals that the kidnapping was his doing, not McKay's. Ellington was responsible for the previous attempts on J.R.'s life and shoots him. Sue Ellen, horrified, rips off J.R.'s shirt to reveal a bulletproof vest.

McKay's victory is incomplete. He owns the ranch, but J.R. reminds him that J.R.'s father Jock Ewing ensured that the Ewing family owns exclusive drilling rights on it. McKay can never profit from oil drilled on the land and owns only the property.

Bobby leaves with Jennifer for a break in Europe, and Ray happily heads back to Europe $50 million richer.

== Ratings ==
Dallas: War of the Ewings ranked 42nd for the week it was shown with a 7.8 rating. By comparison, the previous Dallas TV movie J.R. Returns (shown in November 1996) ranked 14th for the week it was shown with a 13.4 rating.

== Continuity ==
As with J.R. Returns, the events depicted in War of the Ewings are ignored for the revival series, which premiered on TNT in 2012.

== Cast ==
=== Starring in alphabetical order ===
- Patrick Duffy as Bobby Ewing
- Linda Gray as Sue Ellen Ewing
- Larry Hagman as J.R. Ewing
- Michelle Johnson as Jennifer Jantzen
- Steve Kanaly as Ray Krebbs
- George Kennedy as Carter McKay
- Tracy Scoggins as Anita Smithfield

=== Guest star ===
- Philip Anglim as Peter Ellington

=== Co-starring ===
- Mark Dalton as Rustler
- Sean Hennigan as John Savory
- Sonny Franks as Cowboy
- Brad Leland as Deputy Sheriff
- Amanda Welles as J.R.'s Secretary
- Jerry Cotton as Detective Murphy
- Constance Jones as TV Reporter
- John William Hoge as Ratagan
- Paul Pender as J.R.'s Body Guard
- Matthew Tompkins as Stunt Drunk
- Jerry Jones as Himself
- Vernon Grote as Foreman
- Zach Hope as Bellman
- Alfred Biernat as Doorman
- Russell Towery as Stunt Coordinator

== DVD release ==
- Warner Home Video released Dallas: War of the Ewings on DVD April 12, 2011 as part of the Dallas: The Movie Collection two-disc set.
