= Jeri Gaile =

American actress

- Occupation: Television actress
- Years active: 1982–present

Jeri Gaile is an American actress, best known for playing Rose McKay in the soap opera Dallas from 1989 to 1991. Gaile is currently Director of the Spotlight Awards program for the Los Angeles Music Center.

Gaile began training as a classical ballerina when she was 4 years old. She performed with the Bolshoi Ballet, New York City Ballet, and San Francisco Ballet until that part of her career ended when she injured her knee when she was 18. After a year's hiatus, she began modeling and made some commercials for national television, and then she performed as a chorus girl in some stage shows.

In 1990, Gaile guest starred on the drama Murder, She Wrote portraying a country singer, with her own singing voice used on the air. In 1991, Gaile appeared on the situation comedy Night Court as Miranda.
