= J. R. Ewing =

Fictional character from Dallas

- Dallas character
- Larry Hagman as J.R. Ewing (2012)
- First appearance: April 2, 1978 "Digger's Daughter"
- Last appearance: March 4, 2013 "The Furious and the Fast"
- Created by: David Jacobs
- Portrayed by: Larry Hagman
- Crossover appearances: Knots Landing; Dallas: The Early Years; Dallas: J.R. Returns; Dallas: War of the Ewings
- Years: 1978–1991, 1996, 1998, 2012–2013
- Birth: 1936 (Original series); 1939 (TNT series)
- Death: February 1, 2013

In-universe information
- Occupation: Vice President of Ewing Oil (1962–1977); President of Ewing Oil (1977–1982); Shareholder & co-CEO of Ewing Oil (1980–1987, 1988–1990, 1991); 25% Shareholder in Harwood Oil (1982–1983); Founder and CEO of JRE Industries (1987–1988); Founder and CEO of Ewing & Ewing (1991); CEO of WestStar Oil (1996–1998, only in films); Owner of Southfork Ranch (2012)
- Family: Jock Ewing (father); Miss Ellie Ewing Farlow (mother); Clayton Farlow (stepfather); Gary Ewing (brother); Bobby Ewing (brother); Ray Krebbs (half-brother)
- Spouses: Sue Ellen Shepard (1971–81, 1982–88); Cally Harper (1988–91)
- Children: James Beaumont (with Vanessa Beaumont); John Ross Ewing III (with Sue Ellen); Unnamed son (with Cally); Unnamed daughter
- Relatives: Jimmy Beaumont (grandson); Leander Ewing (grandfather); Aaron Southworth (grandfather); Barbara Southworth (grandmother); Jason Ewing (uncle); Garrison Southworth (uncle); Christopher Ewing (nephew; adoptive); Bobby Ewing II (nephew); Lucas Wade Krebbs (nephew); Lucy Ewing (niece); Betsy Ewing (niece); Margaret Krebbs (half-niece); Molly Whittaker (niece); Jack Ewing (cousin); Jamie Ewing Barnes (cousin); Enoch Southworth (great-grandfather); Eleanor Southworth (great-grandmother)

John Ross Ewing Jr. is a fictional character in the American television series Dallas (1978–1991) and its spin-offs, including the continuation series (2012–2014). The character was portrayed by Larry Hagman from the series premiere in 1978 until his death in late 2012; Hagman was the only actor who appeared in all 357 episodes of the original series. As the show's most famous character, J.R. has been central to many of the series' biggest storylines. He is depicted as a covetous, egocentric, manipulative and amoral oil baron with psychopathic tendencies, who is constantly plotting subterfuges to plunder the wealth of his foes. In the PBS series Pioneers of Television, Hagman claimed the character of J.R. began its development when he played a similar character in the film Stardust, and that he was also inspired by a mean boss he once had.

The focus of the series was initially the feuding families, with J.R. just a supporting character, but his popularity grew and the producers acknowledged he became the breakout character. Two highly rated 1980 episodes became part of a cultural phenomenon that year known as "Who shot J.R.?". In "A House Divided", the audience witnessed J.R. being shot by an unknown assailant.

After the cliffhanger was broadcast in March, the audience had to wait until the November conclusion, "Who Done It". With his new-found popularity, Hagman threatened to leave the series unless his contractual demands were met. CBS leaked rumors of recasting, but the actor eventually prevailed. He also appeared in five episodes of spin-off series Knots Landing between 1980 and 1982. The character is featured in the first two seasons of the 2012 reincarnation series as well. Hagman died on November 23, 2012, and Dallas producers subsequently announced that J.R. would be killed off in the second season. The episode "The Furious and the Fast" dealt with J.R.'s death.

J.R. Ewing is considered one of television's most popular characters, with TV Guide naming him #1 in their 2013 list of The 60 Nastiest Villains of All Time. In 2016, Rolling Stone ranked him #11 of their "40 Greatest TV Villains of All Time". In a 2001 Channel 4 poll in the U.K. he was ranked 38th on their list of the 100 Greatest TV Characters.

== Character ==
J.R. has a reputation with his fellow characters, and viewers of the show, as a 'bad man'. He has a ruthless approach to business and frequently engages in bribery, blackmail and other underhand tactics to defeat and destroy his rivals - his principal antagonist being Cliff Barnes. He appears heartless much of the time—indeed taking pride in his nefarious nature. However, there are several instances throughout the original series' run where a more sympathetic and complex side to his character is portrayed, such as evidence of his love for his family. Also in the final season, there are glimpses of a depressive and contemplative nature when musing to Bobby during their cattle drive about how times were changing.

The name “JR” is an homage to the “JR” for Jett Rink in the movie Giant. Jett Rink was the last character played by James Dean before his death. Oil tycoon H. L. Hunt served as loose inspiration for the character of Ewing.

== Storylines ==
=== Original series ===
J.R. Ewing was the eldest son of John Ross "Jock" Ewing Sr. (Jim Davis) and Eleanor "Miss Ellie" Ewing (Barbara Bel Geddes, briefly Donna Reed). J.R. was born on the family's Southfork Ranch. The year of his birth is inconsistent: in Dallas: The Early Years, Miss Ellie announces her pregnancy with J.R. in 1936, making the year of his birth 1936 or at the latest 1937, while in the 2012 continuation of Dallas, J.R.'s gravestone gives his birth year as 1939.

J.R. has two younger brothers, Gary (Ted Shackelford, briefly David Ackroyd) and Bobby (Patrick Duffy); a half-brother, Ray Krebbs (Steve Kanaly), from his father's affair with an Army nurse named Margaret Hunter during World War II.

Starting at age five, J.R. was groomed to be the heir apparent to his father Jock at Ewing Oil, an independent oil company that Jock ran in a very cutthroat, ruthless manner. After coming home from serving for a short time in the Vietnam War during the 1960s, J.R. began his long tenure as an employee of Ewing Oil. He had no interest in working on Southfork Ranch, which was mostly the domain of his mother Miss Ellie, and brothers Bobby and Ray Krebbs, but he did have a strong desire to keep Southfork in the family. Gary was mostly influenced by his mother and embraced the Southworth tradition of ranching on Southfork and had no interest in Ewing Oil. Like their father Jock, J.R. saw Gary as weak, lacking the Ewing character and growing up Gary was unable to stand up to J.R.'s bullying. A teenage Gary met his wife Valene Clements (Joan Van Ark) in the early 1960s; they married when she became pregnant with their daughter Lucy (Charlene Tilton). J.R. did not approve of Gary marrying someone of Valene's status. When their marriage began to disintegrate, Gary left Southfork leaving Valene and Lucy. When Valene attempted to leave with Lucy, J.R. had her run out of town and took Lucy back to live with the Ewings at Southfork. In 1979, Gary and Valene reunited in Dallas and remarried, but rather than try to live at Southfork again, they left to go and live in the (fictional) California suburb of Knots Landing.

Bobby spent his time alternating between Southfork and Ewing Oil, and was Jock's favorite son. This made J.R. enormously determined to impress Jock, but despite his huge success in the oil business, J.R. was never able to overcome Jock's favoritism for Bobby. This led to a rivalry between them in childhood that continued as they grew up, especially when Bobby married Pamela Barnes (Victoria Principal, briefly Margaret Michaels), who was a member of the Ewings' rival family. The legendary Barnes-Ewing feud began in the 1930s between Jock and Pam's legal father Digger (Keenan Wynn, originally David Wayne) after their partnership in the oil business dissolved due to Digger's alcoholism and resentment. Jock had earlier married Digger's girlfriend, Eleanor Southworth, which had caused a dent in their relationship prior to the big schism. The feud continued on decades later with J.R. and Digger's son Cliff (Ken Kercheval).

In 1971, J.R. married Sue Ellen Shepard (Linda Gray), a former "Miss Texas". Their marriage became increasingly turbulent with J.R. ignoring her first with Ewing Oil then philandering with other women. By the late 1970s Sue Ellen had become an alcoholic. They divorced in 1981 only to remarry in 1982 and divorce again in 1988. In 1989, Sue Ellen moved to London with her new lover Don Lockwood (Ian McShane); they married in 1991.

J.R. had two wives and three children during the show's run. His eldest son, James Richard Beaumont (Sasha Mitchell), was by an off-screen affair with Vanessa Beaumont (Gayle Hunnicutt) which occurred in the 1960s but was only brought to knowledge in 1989. His second and most favored son was John Ross Ewing III (Omri Katz) from his first wife Sue Ellen, born in 1979. His third son was with his second wife Cally (Cathy Podewell) born in 1991, however, Cally didn't give birth until after leaving Dallas.

J.R. also initially believed he was the father of Christopher Ewing (Joshua Harris, originally Eric Farlow), the son of his sister-in-law and former mistress Kristin Shepard (Mary Crosby), but it was later revealed J.R. was not the father Jeff Farraday was. Christopher was adopted by Bobby and Pam. In addition to that, J.R.'s second wife Cally and his illegitimate son James successfully plotted to gain revenge on him. After JR kicked Cally off of Southfork he checked into a sanitarium in order to get Clayton Farlow's sister, Jessica Montford, to sign over voting rights in WestStar stock to him. Unbeknownst to him, James and Cally managed to get his release papers from his lawyer, Walter Berman. James pretended to be his lawyer and ultimately left him in the sanitarium. Cally eventually freed him. This was the start of what would eventually be a year where J.R. lost everything.

First, he lost control of Ewing Oil to Cliff, then was fired at West Star Oil by a vengeful Carter McKay (George Kennedy). To top it all off, he lost control of Southfork and was disowned by his son who moved to Europe to be with Sue Ellen. All J.R. was left with was a room in Southfork that Bobby let him stay in and not much else. Contemplating suicide, the character roamed the lonely Southfork with a bottle of bourbon and a loaded revolver. A being, later revealed to be demonic, named Adam (portrayed by Joel Grey) pays a visit to J.R., who cannot believe what he is seeing. The white tuxedo-clad Adam tells J.R. his "boss" likes him and has dispatched him to Earth. In a parallel with the storyline of the movie It's a Wonderful Life, Adam proceeds to take J.R. on a journey to show him what life would have been like for other people if he had not been born.

After being taken through this journey, Adam tries to get J.R. to shoot himself. J.R. tells Adam he does not want to give Adam the satisfaction as he went back to Heaven. Adam then asks J.R. what made him think he was dispatched from Heaven and begins laughing demonically, revealing his true purpose. J.R. is immediately jolted awake in his bedroom while still holding the bourbon bottle and the revolver. He appears relieved that it was only a nightmare, but once again, Adam appears to J.R., this time in the bedroom mirror in a red suit. Adam is determined to have J.R. shoot himself, reminding him of reality for J.R. and the current state of his life and how better off everyone concerned would be. J.R. seems willing to oblige.

Meanwhile, Bobby has returned to Southfork for the night. J.R. does not hear him pull up or enter the house, as his focus is solely on Adam in his mirror. He slowly raises the gun to his head and cocks the hammer, and the frustrated Adam finally screams "Do it!" to J.R. with glowing red eyes. Bobby hears a gunshot and runs to the second floor to J.R.'s bedroom. As he reaches the doorway, he looks into the room and is horrified by what he sees, exclaiming "Oh my God!". J.R.'s fate was not revealed. The "Conundrum" cliffhanger was not resolved until 1996, with the first Dallas reunion movie, Dallas: J.R. Returns. It was revealed in the beginning of the movie that J.R. had not, in fact, shot himself, but had instead shot at the mirror where the demon Adam was appearing to him. The 2012 revival series does not follow the reunion film, but shows J.R. still alive. According to the Dallas Facebook page, J.R. had indeed shot the mirror, but unlike the Reunion film, he didn't flee to Europe to recover.

=== Dallas (2012) ===
J.R. returns in the 2012 revival of the series, which focuses on J.R.'s son John Ross Ewing III and Bobby's adopted son Christopher Ewing. To J.R.'s delight, John Ross has become a carbon copy of him, in that he is more focused on oil, money and power. As the series begins J.R. has spent the last few years in a nursing home, suffering from chronic depression and not speaking despite visits from Bobby. All the events of the two TV movies are ignored.

Bobby visits and tells J.R. that all of their fights over Ewing Oil and Southfork changed him in ways he doesn't like and that he wants Christopher and John Ross to be a real family and not be like them always fighting. When John Ross eventually visits him on Bobby's suggestion, he says that Bobby plans to sell Southfork and give the money from the sale to Christopher to fund Christopher's renewable energy project. John Ross also tells J.R. that he discovered a 2 billion barrel oil reserve under Southfork but Bobby has blocked the drilling. J.R. finally rouses himself to help his son fight the attempts to block his drilling for oil on the ranch and tells John Ross that Bobby was always a fool. He reveals that he is working alongside Marta Del Sol, the daughter of an old friend of J.R.'s, who owns millions of acres of land. Marta is supposedly offering a partnership to Bobby but it's J.R. pulling the strings when Bobby signs Southfork to Marta's conservatory, it'll really be going to J.R. John Ross is really working alongside Marta, with J.R. seeing them together but not seeming to mind. J.R. surprises everyone by showing up at a family gathering (acting as an invalid by using a walker) and apologizing to Bobby and Sue Ellen for his past actions. He later goes to Mexico to see Marta's father, Carlos Del Sol, but he knows nothing of any deal. He then introduces his daughter only she's not the woman J.R. knows as Marta. Realizing he's been fooled, J.R. tells Del Sol he's made a mistake and bites out that Marta should meet his son as "he's a chip off the old block."

J.R. eventually succeeds in getting Southfork from Bobby and doesn't waste any time in beginning to drill for oil on Southfork. He also cuts John Ross out of the partnership. However, he does give his son power of attorney to run his business ventures. J.R. is forced to return ownership of Southfork to Bobby when J.R. and John Ross' Venezuelan investor, Vicente Cano, turns violent against the Ewings when the loan isn't repaid. J.R. and John Ross are given immunity and sign confessions against Cano, who is sent to prison. Bobby keeps a copy of J.R.'s confession and warns him that he will send J.R. to prison if he uses any more dirty tricks. John Ross' fiancée Elena Ramos discovers John Ross' role in the plot, she breaks up with him and returns to Christopher. The first season ends with John Ross and J.R. joining forces against Bobby, Christopher and Elena, who have apparently reunited as a couple.

At the start of the second season, J.R. is mentoring John Ross in business and dirty tricks and they are plotting to take control of Ewing Energies. J.R. also plots against his old rival Cliff Barnes and his daughter Pamela Rebecca Barnes, who is pregnant with Christopher's twins and is having an affair with John Ross. Bobby asks for J.R.'s help to take down Harris Ryland when it's revealed Ryland kidnapped Bobby's stepdaughter Emma and let Bobby's wife Ann think her daughter was dead. J.R. assures Bobby that he will take Ryland down. In the episode "The Furious and the Fast", J.R. talks to John Ross by phone about a "master plan" to defeat Cliff Barnes and Harris Ryland and to help John Ross take control of Ewing Energies, saying it will be his "masterpiece" when somebody apparently walks into the room and shoots twice, killing him.

J.R.'s memorial was held at the Dallas Petroleum Club where many guests from his past attended. J.R.'s favorite drink, bourbon and branch, was served. Guests included J.R.'s half-brother Ray Krebbs, niece Lucy Ewing, brothers Gary Ewing and Bobby Ewing, ex-wives Sue Ellen Ewing and Cally Harper Ewing, ex-mistress Mandy Winger, adopted nephew Christopher Ewing, Elena Ramos and her brother Drew Ramos and J.R.'s son John Ross Ewing III. Other notable guests included Dallas Mayor Mike Rawlings, Dallas Mavericks owner Mark Cuban and Dallas Cowboys owner Jerry Jones. J.R.'s funeral was held at the family cemetery plot on Southfork Ranch. Ray, Lucy, Gary, Christopher, Elena, Sue Ellen, and Bobby all spoke. J.R. was buried next to the graves of Jock and Miss Ellie. At his funeral, Sue Ellen read the letter that J.R. had written to her before he was murdered where he stated that he wanted another chance with her. Sue Ellen referred to J.R. as "the love of my life". Since J.R. had been a war veteran, his coffin was draped in a U.S. Stars and Stripes flag and was handed folded to John Ross because he was his son and next-of-kin.

At the end of the funeral J.R.'s private investigator Bum Jones arrives at the gravesite. In the office at Southfork, Bum tells Bobby, John Ross, and Christopher that J.R. was in Abu Dhabi closing a deal to buy some oil leases but that his real reason for being in Abu Dhabi was because for the last several months he was trying to find Christopher's adoptive mother and Bobby's ex-wife Pamela Barnes Ewing. Bum gives Christopher some papers that would tell why it was important for Christopher to find Pam. Bum reveals that J.R. was in Nuevo Laredo following a lead to take down Harris Ryland using the quail hunt as a cover story. John Ross assumes that Ryland was behind his father's murder but Bum says that J.R. was killed by a random mugger. John Ross is given a box containing a pistol and a note from J.R. telling John Ross that now that he is dead, Cliff Barnes and Ryland will join forces to take down the Ewings. The note also says John Ross should use the contents of the box "to take from them what they want to take from us" and that afterwards "Bobby will know what to do." J.R. ends the note by telling John Ross not to forget that he is J.R.'s son "from tip to tail". Bum gives a letter to Bobby. Bobby reads the letter but doesn't reveal what it says and tells John Ross and Christopher that it is between J.R. and him for the time being. Bobby and Bum talk outside the office where Bobby tells Bum to pay off whoever he has to in order to make everyone believe that J.R. was killed by a mugger and when the time is right the Ewings will handle the situation as a family. Bobby goes to J.R.'s bedroom and drinks some of J.R.'s trademark bourbon. Bobby, imagining talking to J.R., says that he knew J.R. would have one final card to play and it was a good one. Bobby says he loves J.R. and he breaks down crying. Bobby, John Ross and Christopher continue working together on the plan and they realise how important it is to find Pam, because she owns one-third of Barnes Global shares along with Katherine and Cliff. With Katherine dead it only leaves her. It was said she entered Abu Dhabi with her husband in 1989. Bobby finally reveals that J.R's master plan was to frame Cliff for his death "from beyond the grave". He reveals that J.R., knowing that he only had days to live from terminal cancer, had Bum steal Cliff's pistol. J.R. knew that Cliff went to Nuevo Laredo, Mexico every year for a fishing competition. J.R. had Bum meet him there and kill him. His plan was to have the Ewing family plant the pistol and J.R.'s trademark belt buckle in Cliff's car and safety deposit box.

== Reunion movies ==
Two Dallas reunion TV movies were produced in the 1990s. Though these movies, at the time, continued the story of Dallas, they were later discarded for continuity purposes when the 2012 Dallas revival series was launched. In the first reunion movie, Dallas: J.R. Returns (1996), it was revealed that J.R. had shot the mirror in front of him and moved away to Europe for a few years. He returned and attempted to take back his empire, succeeding to an extent as he drove Cliff Barnes out of Ewing Oil, returning it to Bobby. J.R. was also elected chairman of West Star Oil, a feat he had spent almost fifteen years fighting to achieve. A second reunion movie, Dallas: War of the Ewings (1998), saw J.R. as CEO of West Star, try and fail to force a merger with Ewing Oil, but he did claim the consolation of conning $50 million from Carter McKay.

== Cars ==
J.R. initially drove a green 1978 Mercedes-Benz 280SE, later replaced by a 1979 Reseda Green Mercedes-Benz 450SEL. In 1981, he drove a redesigned W126 380SEL, also in Reseda Green. In 1983 when his wife Sue Ellen wrecked the car at the end of the Southfork driveway, J.R. replaced it with another 1983 Mercedes Benz 380SEL. In 1984, Mercedes-Benz changed the flagship S-Class model to the 500SEL, J.R. then replaced the 380 with one of these. At the beginning of the 1986 season, J.R. drove a facelifted W126 560SEL but soon after replaced it with a Cadillac Allanté convertible which he drove from 1987 to 1991. At the end of the regular series run in 1991, J.R. drove a Lincoln Mark VII. J.R.'s father, Jock, had driven an earlier generation Lincoln Mark V at the beginning of the series in 1978.

In J.R. Returns, J.R. drives the 500SEL yet again for the first portion of the film. However, this vehicle is totaled and replaced with an updated silver 1996 Mercedes-Benz W140 S420 sedan. In War of the Ewings, J.R. is driving a silver 1998 SL500 Roadster.

Each of J.R.'s vehicles had the personalized license plate "EWING 3".

== Legacy ==
- In 1999 TV Guide ranked him number 11 on its "50 Greatest TV Characters of All Time" list. In the updated 2013 list, he was number 1.
- Wizard magazine ranked him the 69th Greatest Villain of all time while Best Villains on TV: Top Ten of Yahoo! Voices picked him as No. 1.
- WWE professional wrestler John "Bradshaw" Layfield, modeled his post-APA villainous persona after Ewing.
- Rapper Sir Mix-a-Lot compared himself to him, in the song Posse on Broadway by saying, "I'm the man, they love to hate. The J.R. Ewing of Seattle".
