= Linda Gray =

American actress (born 1940)

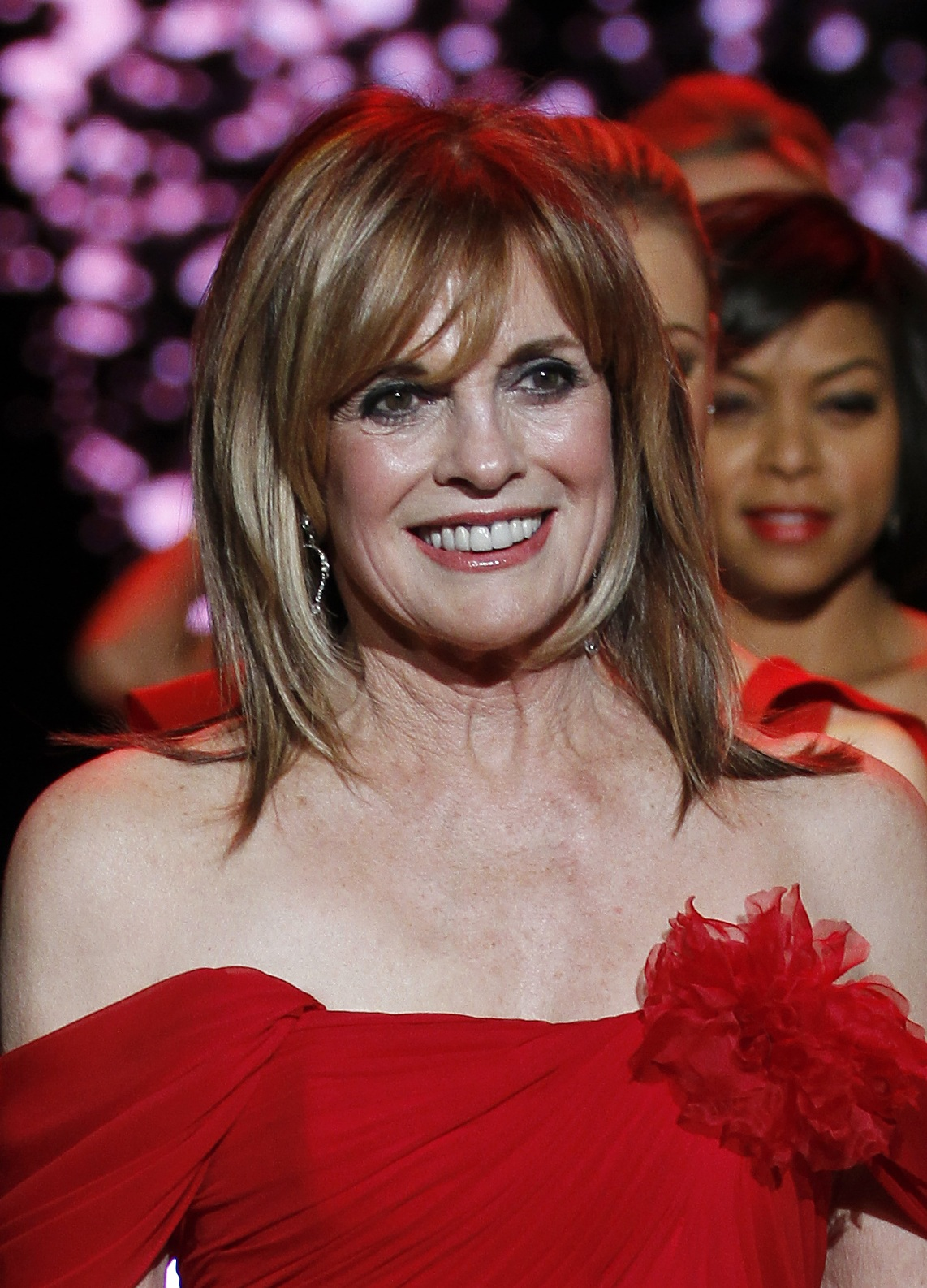
- Gray at The Heart Truth show in 2011
- Born: Linda Ann Gray; September 12, 1940 (age 86); Santa Monica, California, U.S.
- Occupations: Actress; director; producer; model (former)
- Years active: 1963–present
- Spouse: Ed Thrasher (m. 1962; div. 1983)
- Children: 2

Linda Ann Gray (born September 12, 1940) is an American actress, best known for her role as Sue Ellen Ewing, the long-suffering wife of Larry Hagman's character J.R. Ewing on the CBS television drama series Dallas (1978–1989, 1991, 2012–2014). The role also earned her a nomination for the 1981 Primetime Emmy Award for Outstanding Lead Actress in a Drama Series as well as two Golden Globe Award nominations.

Gray began her career in the 1960s in television commercials. In the 1970s, she appeared in numerous TV series before landing the role of Sue Ellen Ewing in 1978. After leaving Dallas in 1989, she appeared opposite Sylvester Stallone in the 1991 film Oscar. From 1994 to 1995, she played a leading role in the Fox drama series Models Inc., and also starred in TV movies, including Moment of Truth: Why My Daughter? (1993) and Accidental Meeting (1994). She went on to reprise the role of Sue Ellen in Dallas: J.R. Returns (1996), Dallas: War of the Ewings (1998), and in the TNT series Dallas (2012–2014), which continued the original series.

On stage, Gray starred as Mrs. Robinson in The Graduate in the West End of London in 2001, then on Broadway the following year. In 2007, she starred as Aurora Greenaway in the world premiere production of Terms of Endearment at the Theatre Royal, York and stayed with the production when it toured the United Kingdom. After the second Dallas was cancelled in 2014, Gray again took to the stage, this time in the role of the Fairy Godmother in a London production of Cinderella.

== Early life ==
Linda Gray was born in 1940 in Santa Monica, California. She grew up in Culver City, California, where her father, Leslie, who was a watchmaker, had a shop.

Before acting, Gray worked as a model in the 1960s and began her acting career in television commercials, nearly 400 of them—and also made brief appearances in feature films, such as Under the Yum Yum Tree and Palm Springs Weekend in 1963.

== Career ==
Gray began her professional acting career in the 1970s with guest roles on many television series such as Marcus Welby, M.D., McCloud, and Switch, prior to signing with Universal Studios in 1974. She also appeared in the films The Big Rip-Off (1975) and Dogs (1976). In 1977, she was cast as fashion model Linda Murkland, the first transgender series regular on American television, in the television series All That Glitters. The show, a spoof of the soap-opera format, was cancelled after just 13 weeks. Gray was then cast as suspicious wife Carla Cord in the 1977 television movie Murder in Peyton Place.

=== Dallas ===
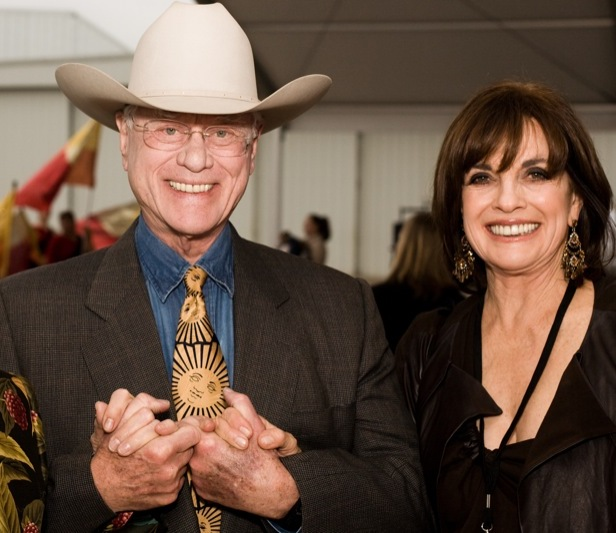
Gray with Larry Hagman in 2009

Gray achieved stardom for her role as Sue Ellen Ewing, J.R.'s long-suffering alcoholic wife, in the CBS drama series Dallas (1978–1989, 1991). Initially a recurring guest role for the five episodes (credited as the first season) in the original series, Gray became a series regular in the second season (1978–1979) and remained with the show until her departure in 1989. Her character was well received by television critics. The Biography Channel stated "Who could ever forget Dallas with the vodka-swilling Sue Ellen Ewing, replete with shoulder pads long before Dynasty, staggering around Southfork Ranch with a permanently tearful expression as she suffered the brunt of J.R. Ewing’s evil ways?" The Boulevard stated "It may be 2009 and seventeen years since the primetime drama Dallas went off the air, but memories of the Ewing family still linger. Corruption and betrayal, lies, greed, affairs and scandal—all were just part of another day at the Southfork Ranch. At the center of it all was one of our favorite Ewings, the person we couldn't help but root for each week as she drank and slept her way through one ordeal after another. This, of course, was the tortured and (sometimes) villainous Sue Ellen Shepard Ewing, former Texas beauty queen and trophy wife of the womanizing rogue J.R. Ewing, played to perfection by actress Linda Gray." Gray was nominated for two Golden Globe Award for Best Actress – Television Series Drama and Primetime Emmy Award for Outstanding Lead Actress in a Drama Series for her performance on Dallas. She also received numerous international awards including Germany's Bambi Award, Italy's Il Gato and she was named Woman of the Year by the Hollywood Radio & Television Society in 1982.

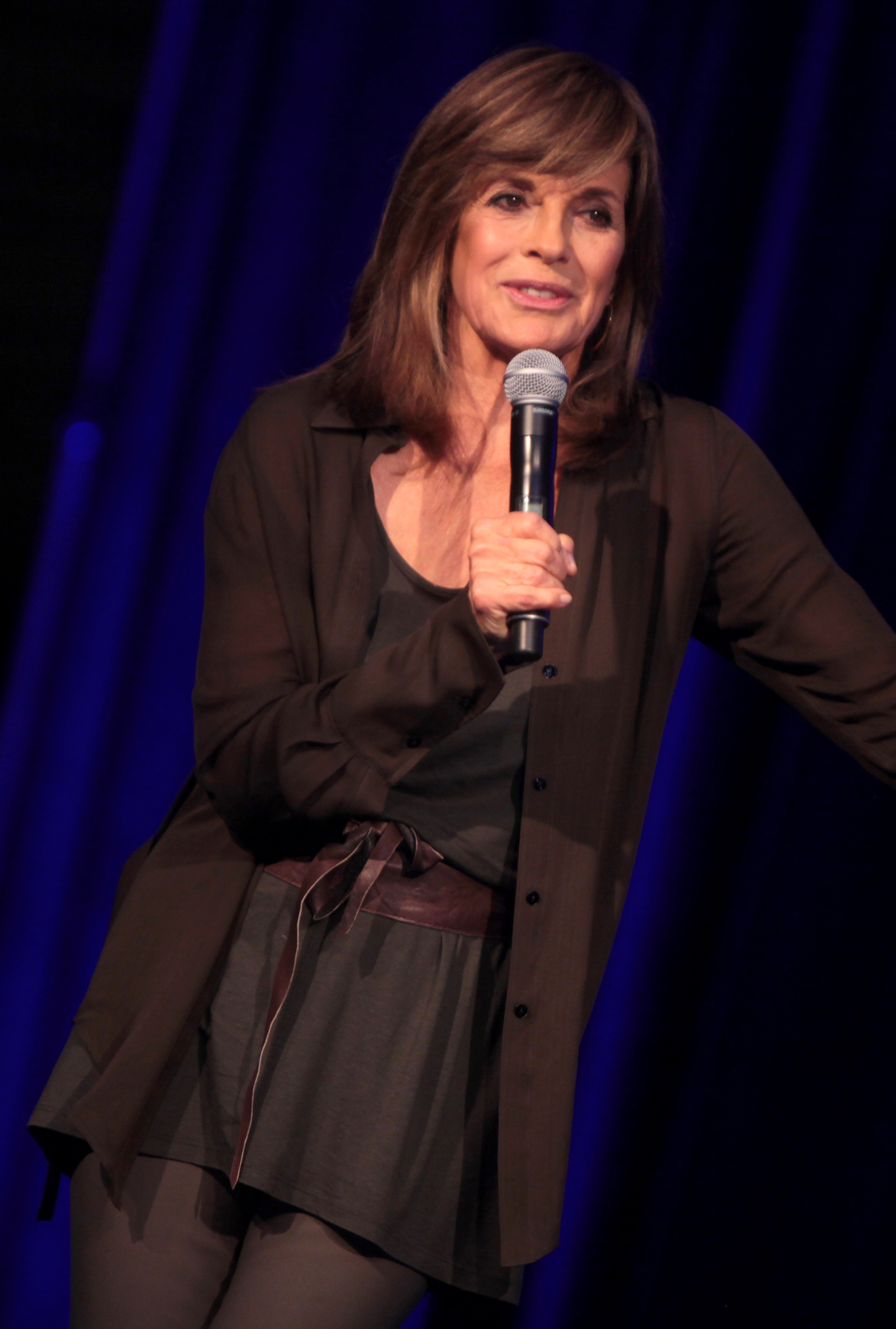
Gray speaking at the 2014 Arizona Ultimate Women's Expo

=== After Dallas ===
After Dallas, Gray appeared in the 1991 comedy film, Oscar with Sylvester Stallone and then made guest appearances in British drama Lovejoy (starring her co-star and love interest from her final season on Dallas, Ian McShane). She also starred in several made-for-TV movies, including 1991's The Entertainers (with Bob Newhart), Bonanza: The Return (1993), Moment of Truth: Why My Daughter (1993), and Accidental Meeting (1994). In 1994, she made several guest appearances on the Fox prime time soap opera Melrose Place, starring as Hillary Michaels, the mother of Amanda Woodward (Heather Locklear). She continued the role in the Melrose Place spin-off Models Inc., where her character Hillary ran a modelling agency, but the show was cancelled after one season. Gray appeared in the Dallas reunion television movies Dallas: J.R. Returns (1996) and Dallas: War of the Ewings (1998), but in the following years did not appear in movies or on television.

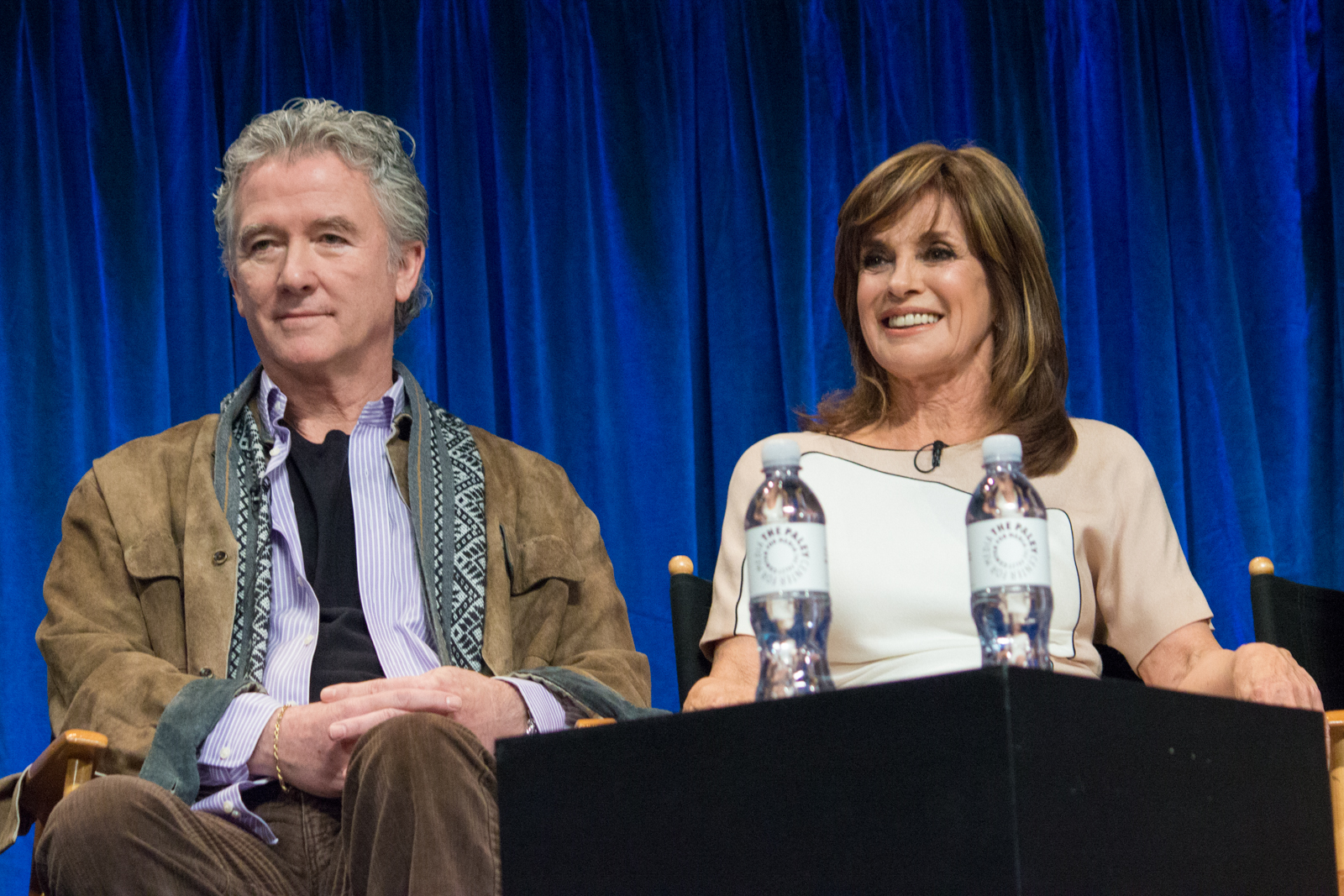
Gray and Patrick Duffy at the PaleyFest 2013 forum for Dallas

In 2001, Gray portrayed Mrs. Robinson in the West End theatre production of Charles Webb's The Graduate. This brought her full circle, as her legs (not Anne Bancroft's) had appeared in the poster for the 1967 film version of The Graduate, showing Mrs. Robinson's legs being admired by Dustin Hoffman. She also briefly played the role in the Broadway production, when she filled-in for Kathleen Turner in September 2002. Gray made her theater directing debut with the play Murder in the First, and other stage acting work includes: Terms of Endearment, The Vagina Monologues, Agnes of God and Love Letters.

=== Recent years ===
Gray returned to television in 2004 as a guest star in five episodes of the daytime soap opera The Bold and the Beautiful, playing Priscilla Kelly. Gray starred in several independent films, including the award-winning drama Reflections of a Life (2006), where she played the best friend of a woman undergoing treatment for breast cancer; Expecting Mary (2010); The Flight of the Swan (2011); and Hidden Moon (2012).

In 2008, Gray appeared in The CW series 90210, which, like Melrose Place and Models Inc. before it, is a spin-off from the original Beverly Hills, 90210. Gray has now appeared in three of the five series in the franchise, though her role in 90210 was not Hillary Michaels, the character she played on Melrose Place (1992) and Models Inc.

In 2012, Gray reprised her role as Sue Ellen Ewing in the TNT drama series Dallas, a continuation of the original series. In 2013, she was listed as one of the fifty best-dressed over 50s by the Guardian. In April 2013, she was listed in People magazine's annual Most Beautiful Woman list.

Over Christmas 2014, she performed in pantomime in London, playing the Fairy Godmother in Cinderella. In 2015, she starred in the Hallmark Channel film A Perfect Wedding, and was cast as grandmother in The CW summer comedy series, Significant Mother. She also appeared as Joanna Winterthorne in the soap opera web series Winterthorne.

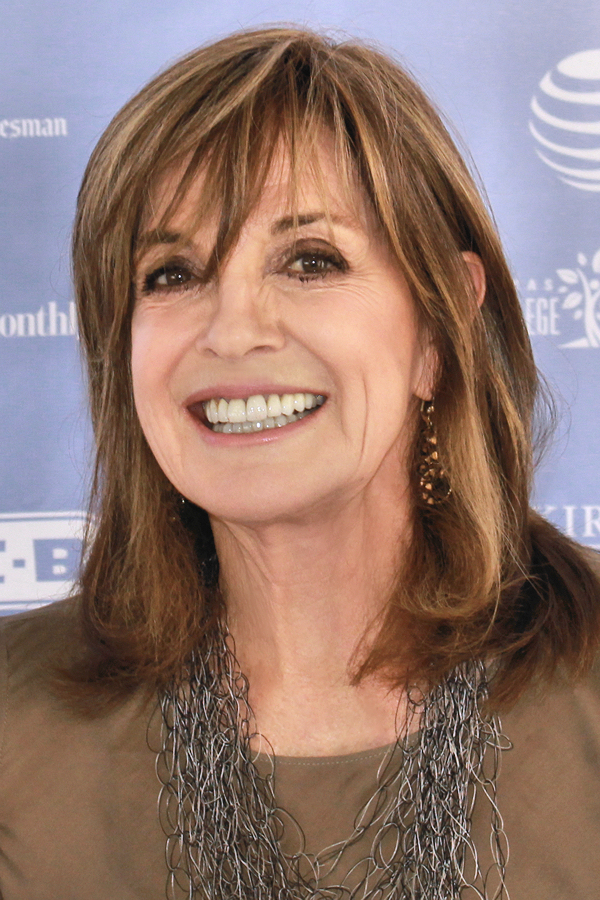
Gray at the 2015 Texas Book Festival

On August 17, 2016, it was announced that Gray would join the cast of the British Channel 4 soap opera, Hollyoaks, as Tabitha Maxwell-Brown, the mother of recently established character Marnie Nightingale, played by Lysette Anthony. Gray made her first appearance as Tabitha on November 15, 2016, and departed on November 22, 2016. It was later announced that Gray had signed a contract with Hollyoaks in order for her to appear on the soap opera for a longer period of time. The character of Tabitha returned on February 27, 2017, before departing again on February 28, 2017.

In 2017, Gray joined the cast of Amazon Studios drama series, Hand of God, starring opposite Ron Perlman and Dana Delany.

On October 3, 2023, it was announced that Gray would feature in the Lifetime film, Ladies of the '80s: A Divas Christmas. According to the official synopsis, the movie follows five soap opera divas readying for a reunion show who take on playing cupid during Christmas to bring together their director and producer as they all learn the meaning of true Christmas spirit. The ensemble cast is made up of Gray, Loni Anderson, Morgan Fairchild, Donna Mills, and Nicollette Sheridan.

== Personal life ==
Gray was married from 1962 to 1983 to Ed Thrasher, an art director and photographer. The marriage resulted in two children: Jeff Thrasher and Kehly Sloane (an actress who appeared in the original Dallas as Sue Ellen's secretary when she ran Valentine Lingerie); Jeff died of leukemia in November 2020. Gray has two grandsons. Her younger sister, Betty, died from breast cancer in 1989. She resides in Los Angeles, California.

== Filmography ==
=== Film ===
Year	Title	Role	Notes
1963	Palm Springs Weekend	Girl at Pool with Yellow Swimsuit	Uncredited
1967	The Graduate	Cover poster leg model	Uncredited
1975	The Big Rip-Off		Television film
1976	Dogs	Miss Engle	
1977	Murder in Peyton Place	Carla Cord	Television film
1978	The Grass Is Always Greener Over the Septic Tank	Leslie Corliss	Television film
1979	The Two Worlds of Jennie Logan	Elizabeth Harrington	Television film
1980	Haywire	Nan	Television film
1980	The Wild and the Free	Linda	Television film
1982	Not in Front of the Children	Nancy Carruthers	Television film
1987	The Gambler III: The Legend Continues	Mary Collins	Television film
1991	The Entertainers	Laura	
1991	Oscar	Roxanne	
1992	Highway Heartbreaker	Catherine	Television film
1993	Moment of Truth: Why My Daughter?	Gayle Moffitt	Television film
1993	Bonanza: The Return	Abigail 'Laredo' Stimmons	Television film
1994	To My Daughter with Love	Eleanor Monroe	Television film
1994	Accidental Meeting	Jennifer Parris	Television film
1994	Moment of Truth: Broken Pledges	Eileen Stevens	Television film
1996	Dallas: J.R. Returns	Sue Ellen Ewing	Television film
1997	When the Cradle Falls	Helen Sawyer	Television film
1998	Dallas: War of the Ewings	Sue Ellen Ewing	Television film
1998	Star of Jaipur	Linda Trask	
2005	McBride: It's Murder, Madam	Victoria Sawyer	Television film
2006	Reflections of a Life	Linda	Short film
2010	Expecting Mary	Darnella	
2011	The Flight of the Swan	Alexi's mother	
2012	Hidden Moon	Eva Brighton	
2015	Perfect Match	Gabby	Television film
2016	Wally's Will	Wally	Short film
2019	Prescience	Kathlyn Smith	
2019	Grand-Daddy Day Care	Blanche	
2023	Ladies of the '80s: A Divas Christmas	Lauren Ewing	Television film

=== Television ===
Year	Title	Role	Notes
1974	Marcus Welby, M.D.	Patsy Grey	Episode: "The Resident"
1976	McCloud	Cindy Yates/Kate O'Hannah	Episodes: "Our Man in the Harem" and "Twas the Fight Before Christmas..."
1977	Switch	Alison	Episode: "Camera Angles"
1977	All That Glitters	Linda Murkland	Series regular, 65 episodes
1977	Big Hawaii	Annie Quinlan	Episode: "Pipeline"
1976–1978	Emergency!	Evelyn Davis/Judy	Episodes: "That Time of Year" and "The Steel Inferno"
1978–1989, 1991	Dallas	Sue Ellen Ewing	Series regular, 308 episodes
1991	Lovejoy	Cassandra Lynch	Episodes: "Riding in Rollers" and "The Black Virgin of Vladimir"
1994	Melrose Place	Hillary Michaels	Special guest star, 4 episodes
1994	Mighty Max	Kali (voice)	Episode: "Good Golly Ms. Kali"
1994–1995	Models Inc.	Hillary Michaels	Series regular, 29 episodes
1996	Touched by an Angel	Marian Campbell	Episode: "The Portrait of Mrs. Campbell"
2004–2005	The Bold and the Beautiful	Priscilla Kelly	Special guest star, 5 episodes
2006	Pepper Dennis	Barbara Meryl	Episode: "Heiress Bridenapped: Film at Eleven"
2008	90210	Victoria Brewer	Episode: "The Jet Set"
2012–2014	Dallas	Sue Ellen Ewing	Series regular, 40 episodes
2015	Significant Mother	Gammy	Episode: "Suffering & Succotash"
2015	Winterthorne	Joanna Winterthorne	Special guest star, 4 episodes
2015	Studio 10	Herself - Guest	TV series Australia, 1 episode
2015	Studio 10	Herself - Guest with Patrick Duffy	TV series Australia, 1 episode
2016–2017	Hollyoaks	Tabitha Maxwell-Brown	Recurring role, 5 episodes
2017	Hand of God	Aunt Val	Recurring role, 3 episodes
2018	Hilton Head Island	Eloise Beckenridge	Recurring role, 5 episodes
2022	Tara Tremendous	Dr. Sabine Montgomery	Voice role, 1 episode

== Awards and nominations ==
Year	Award	Category	Work	Result
1981	Golden Globe Award	Golden Globe Award for Best Actress – Television Series Drama	Dallas	Nominated
1981	Emmy Award	Primetime Emmy Award for Outstanding Lead Actress in a Drama Series	Dallas	Nominated
1981	Il Gato	Best Actress on Television	Dallas	Won
1982	Golden Globe Award	Golden Globe Award for Best Actress – Television Series Drama	Dallas	Nominated
1982	Bambi Award	Best Actress on international series	Dallas	Won
1983	Hollywood Radio & Television Society	Woman of the Year	Dallas	Won
1986	Soap Opera Digest Award	Outstanding Actress in a Leading Role on a Prime Time Serial	Dallas	Nominated
1986	Soap Opera Digest Award	Favorite Super Couple on a Prime Time Serial	Dallas	Nominated
1986	Soap Opera Digest Award	Outstanding Actress in a Leading Role: Prime Time	Dallas	Nominated
1986	Soap Opera Digest Award	Favorite Super Couple on a Prime Time Serial	Dallas	Nominated
2006	TV Land Award	Pop Culture Award	Dallas	Won
2014	USA Film Festival Award	Special Award		Won
