= Steve Kanaly =

American actor

- Born: Steven Francis Kanaly; March 14, 1946 (age 80); Burbank, California, U.S.
- Occupation: Actor
- Years active: 1972–2014
- Spouse: Brent Power (1975–present)
- Children: 2

Steven Francis Kanaly (/kəˈneɪliː/; born March 14, 1946) is an American actor, best known for his role as Ray Krebbs on the CBS primetime soap opera Dallas.

== Early life and career ==
Kanaly was born in Burbank, California, and grew up in the San Fernando Valley. He attended California State University, Northridge. Kanaly served in the Vietnam War as a radio operator with the First Air Cavalry Division. He provided details of his experiences in the service to Apocalypse Now screenwriter John Milius for scenes in the film involving the character of Colonel Bill Kilgore (Robert Duvall). He once described how he entered film acting:

"It was through John Milius as I mentioned earlier and he wrote a film for himself to direct but that was bought out by Paul Newman's company who hired John Huston to direct The Life and Times of Judge Roy Bean. Through Milius I was introduced to John Huston and Milius suggested that I would be fine to play one of the Western roles in that film, specifically I had never done any acting previous to that. They saw me and I had a meeting and was offered the job, basically I jumped in with both feet and one week turned out to be twelve and you know I said "I think I'm going to stay with this".

Kanaly is best known for his role as Ray Krebbs, foreman of the Southfork Ranch, on the primetime soap opera Dallas from 1978 to 1989. He reprised the role for the final episode of the series in 1991, and again for the made-for-TV reunion movie Dallas: War of the Ewings (1998). He reprised the role again in the 2012 TNT revival attending his nephew Christopher's wedding. In 2013, Kanaly reprised the role of Ray Krebbs to attend the funeral of J. R. Ewing.

During Dallas' run, he also guested in other series, including Time Express in 1979. From 1994 to 1995, he also had a role on the ABC daytime drama series All My Children as Seabone Hunkle, the father of Dixie Cooney Martin (played by Cady McClain). Kanaly has also guest starred on numerous other television series. In film, he collaborated frequently with writer-director John Milius, appearing in, among others, The Life and Times of Judge Roy Bean, Dillinger, The Wind and the Lion and Big Wednesday. Milius befriended Kanaly when they attended the same shooting range in California, and turned him to acting by recommending him to John Huston for Roy Bean. Other film roles include The Terminal Man, My Name Is Nobody and Midway. He starred as J. T. Fuller in an episode of Walker, Texas Ranger.

== Personal life ==
Kanaly recorded a radio public service announcement for CARE in 1981, and he and former Dallas costar Susan Howard were featured in 1992 NRA advertisements promoting responsible firearms ownership. He and his wife live on a ranch in Ojai, California. He is a highly regarded watercolor artist.

== Filmography ==
=== Film ===
Year	Title	Role	Notes
1972	The Life and Times of Judge Roy Bean	Lucky Jim	
1973	Dillinger	Pretty Boy Floyd	
1973	My Name Is Nobody	False Barber	
1974	The Sugarland Express	Officer Ernie Jessup	
1974	The Terminal Man	Edmonds	
1974	Act of Vengeance	Tom	
1975	The Wind and the Lion	Captain Jerome	
1976	Midway	Lt. Cmdr. Lance E. "Lem" Massey	
1978	Big Wednesday	Sally's Husband	
1983	Balboa	Sam Cole	
1984	Fleshburn	Dr. Sam MacKenzie	
1988	Headhunter	Captain Ted Calvin	
1989	Last Stand at Lang Mei	Major Verdun	
1991	Trabbi Goes to Hollywood	Mr. Goodwyn	Alternate title: Driving Me Crazy
1992	Double Trouble	Kent	
1994	Pumpkinhead II: Blood Wings	Judge Dixon	Direct-to-video
1997	Midnight Blue	Collier	
1997	The Marksmen	Hank Madden	Also director
1998	Scorpio One	Commander Wilson	
2002	Leaving the Land	Sheriff Butler	Also director
2005	Lost in Plainview	Detective #1	

=== Television ===
Year	Title	Role	Notes
1973	Chase	Jock	Episode: "Sizzling Stones"
1974	Melvin Purvis: G-Man	Sam Cowley	Television movie
1976	Starsky & Hutch	Kim	Episode: "Silence"
1976	The Bionic Woman	Tanner	Episode: "Assault on the Princess"
1976	Amelia Earhart	Gordon	Television miniseries
1976	The Quest	Turk	Episode: "Day of Outrage"
1977	Police Story	Bob Zieff	Episode: "Trial Board"
1977	The November Plan	Parker	Television movie
1977	Young Joe, the Forgotten Kennedy	Ray Pierce	Television movie
1978	Hawaii Five-O	Glen Fallon	Episode: "The Sleeper"
1978–1989, 1991	Dallas	Ray Krebbs	Series regular, 286 episodes Soap Opera Digest Award for Outstanding Actor in a Supporting Role in a Prime Time (1984, 1985, 1988); TV Land Pop Culture Award (2006); Nominated - Soap Opera Digest Award for Outstanding Actor in a Supporting Role in a Prime Time (1986, 1989)
1979	Time Express	Michael Bennett	Episode: "The Death/Boxer"
1979	Charlie's Angels	Harold Sims	Episode: "Avenging Angel"
1980	To Find My Son	Arthur Gwen	Television movie
1982	Fantasy Island	Ken	Episode: "The Beautiful Skeptic/The Lost Platoon"
1983	Fantasy Island	Allen Daly	Episode: "Revenge of the Forgotten/Charo"
1980–1983	The Love Boat	Bill Davis / Mr. Massey	3 episodes
1984	Hotel	Ed Kerwin	Episode: "Mistaken Identities"
1985	Hotel	Zack Shepherd	Episode: "Love and Honor"
1989	The Twilight Zone	Scout	Episode: "Stranger in Possum Meadows"
1992	FBI: The Untold Stories	Agt. Bob Kane	Episode: "Colonel Penn"
1993	In the Heat of the Night	Cowboy Habersham	Episode: "Incident at Brewer's Pond"
1993–1994	Okavango: The Wild Frontier	J. D. Helms	Series regular, 14 episodes
1994	The Last Chance Detectives: Mystery Lights of Navajo Mesa	Sheriff Smitty	Television movie
1994–1995	All My Children	Seabone Hunkle	Series regular
1995	The Last Chance Detectives: Legend of the Desert Bigfoot	Sheriff Smitty	Television movie
1996	The Last Chance Detectives: Escape from Fire Lake	Sheriff Smitty	Television movie
1998	Dallas: War of the Ewings	Ray Krebbs	Television movie
1998	The Cowboy and the Movie Star	Frank Dumas	Television movie
1999	Walker, Texas Ranger	J.T. Fuller	Episode: "Widow Maker"
2004	The Division	Duke Winingham	Episode: "Rush to the Door"
2004	Dallas Reunion: The Return to Southfork	Himself / Ray Krebbs	Television special
2012–2014	Dallas	Ray Krebbs	4 episodes
2014	DeVanity	Charles Kane	Episode: "Death Becomes Him: Part 2"
