= Ray Krebbs =

Character from "Dallas"

- Dallas character
- Portrayed by: Steve Kanaly
- Duration: 1978–89, 1991, 1998, 2012–14
- First appearance: April 2, 1978; Digger's Daughter
- Last appearance: March 17, 2014; Lifting the Veil
- Created by: David Jacobs
- Spin-off appearances: Dallas: War of the Ewings (1998)
In-universe information
- Occupation: Shop Foreman at Southfork Ranch; Owner of Krebbs Park Villas in San Antonio; Shareholder in Ewing Oil; Co-Owner of Saddle Tree Enterprises
- Family: Ewing
- Father: Jock Ewing
- Mother: Margaret Hunter
- Stepfather: Amos Krebbs
- Stepmother: Miss Ellie Ewing
- Half-brothers: J.R. Ewing; Gary Ewing; Bobby Ewing
- Wife: Donna McCullum (1981–87); Jenna Wade (1987–)
- Daughters: Margaret Krebbs
- Adoptive sons: Lucas Wade-Krebbs
- Stepdaughters: Charlie Wade
- Grandparents: Leander Ewing
- Uncles: Jason Ewing
- Aunts: Lil Trotter
- Nephews: James Beaumont; John Ross Ewing III; Unnamed nephew (J. R.'s son with Cally); Bobby Ewing II; Christopher Ewing (adoptive); Lucas Wade (before Ray adopted him)
- Nieces: Unnamed niece (J. R.'s daughter with an unknown woman); Lucy Ewing; Betsy Ewing; Molly Whittaker
- First cousins: Jamie Ewing Barnes; Jack Ewing; Mickey Trotter
- Other relatives: Jimmy Beaumont (great-nephew)

Ray Krebbs is a fictional character in the American television series Dallas, played by Steve Kanaly from 1978 to 1989. Ray Krebbs is the illegitimate son of Texas oil baron Jock Ewing. He later appeared in the reunion movie Dallas: War of the Ewings (1998) and made guest appearances in the 2012 continuation of Dallas.

== Storylines ==
=== Original series ===
Ray worked for Jock, maintaining Southfork as its ranch foreman. Initially, Ray was a bit of a rogue, dating the much younger Lucy Ewing on the sly, and collaborating with J.R. Ewing to break up J.R.'s younger brother Bobby and his new wife (and Ray's old flame), Pamela Barnes. Despite this, Ray had a good heart and became a trusted and upstanding friend of the Ewing family. Eventually, Amos Krebbs showed up in Dallas in 1980 and revealed that he was not Ray's father, reading out information in Margaret Hunter's diary to Jock Ewing, which revealed that Jock was Ray's father. Jock welcomed Ray into the Ewing family and publicly acknowledged Ray as his son. Because of the incestuous implications, Ray eventually found happiness with the politician and widow of former Texas governor Sam Culver, Donna Culver Krebbs, and they married in 1981.

=== Reunion film ===
In 1998, Ray (with dyed brown hair) makes a shocking return in Dallas: War of the Ewings when he helps Bobby and Sue Ellen in a bar-room brawl. It is later revealed that Ray is broke as the Krebbs ranch was remortgaged several times (how Ray owned the ranch again is unknown, as it was last seen owned by Michelle Stevens in 1991). Bobby helps him out until J.R. unwittingly helps Ray pocket $50 million for the land, which was auctioned to J.R.'s bitter rival, Carter McKay. The land was valued at only $10 million but happened to be a source of crude oil, which started a bidding war between J.R. and McKay. McKay's bid won the auction, but J.R. later revealed that, in Jock's will, the mineral rights were deeded to the Ewings' trust, thereby making the oil inaccessible to Carter McKay.

=== 2012 revival ===
Ray appeared occasionally in the continuation of Dallas. In 2012, Ray attended his nephew Christopher's wedding to Rebecca Sutter (or Pamela Rebecca Barnes) and later appeared at Bobby's final Southfork barbecue. In 2013, Ray attended J.R.'s funeral at Southfork, where he said that he could never make Jock proud the way J.R. did. Ray was mentioned in J.R.'s will, but only with the words "Hello, Ray". In 2014, Ray appeared again at Southfork to attend the wedding of his nephew John Ross to Pamela Rebecca Barnes.

Since Ray's return to Dallas, no mention was made of Jenna, his daughter Margaret, stepdaughter Charlie, or adopted son Lucas.
