= Ewing family (Dallas) =

Fictional family featured in American soap opera Dallas

Ewing
- Dallas family
- The Ewing family around 1980. From left to right: Ray, Bobby, Pam, Miss Ellie, Jock, Lucy, J.R., and Sue Ellen
- First appearance: "Digger's Daughter"; April 2, 1978
- Last appearance: "Brave New World"; September 22, 2014
- Created by: David Jacobs

The Ewing family is the fictional family of the American prime time soap opera Dallas and its 2012 revival, as well as the foundation of the spin-off series Knots Landing. In the original series of Dallas, the Ewings own and run Southfork Ranch and the oil giant Ewing Oil; in the revival series, Ewing Oil is replaced by Ewing Global, formerly Ewing Energies. Knots Landing features the large corporation of Gary Ewing Enterprises.

== Family members ==
Italics indicates offscreen or unnamed character. Bold indicates series regular on Dallas, Knots Landing or the revival series.

- Leander Ewing †
  - Jason Ewing † (1906–84), son of Leander, married Nancy Shaw (1950s–62)
    - **Jack Ewing** (1951–94), son of Jason and Nancy, married April Stevens (1984–85)
    - Jamie Ewing (1959–87), daughter of Jason and Nancy, married Cliff Barnes (Note: Barnes family branch: Henry Barnes †; Willard "Digger" Barnes † (1909–80), son of Henry, married Rebecca Blake (1943–55); Tyler Barnes † (1943), son of Digger and Rebecca; Clifford "Cliff" Barnes (1945–), son of Digger and Rebecca, married Jamie Ewing (1985–87), Michelle Stevens (1991); Pamela Rebecca Barnes (1985–), illegitimate daughter of Cliff and Afton Cooper, married Christopher Ewing (2012–13), John Ross Ewing III (2013–); Catherine Barnes † (1947), daughter of Digger and Rebecca - Incorrect (Catherine was not a Barnes. She was daughter of Rebecca Wentworth and her 2nd husband, not Digger Barnes. She also was younger than half-sister Pam); Pamela Jean Barnes † (1950–89), illegitimate daughter of Rebecca and Hutchinson "Hutch" McKinney, adopted by Digger, married Ed Haynes (1968), Bobby Ewing (1978–83, 1986–87); Christopher Ewing † (1981–), illegitimate son of Kristin Shepard and Jeff Farraday, adopted by Bobby and Pam, married Pamela Rebecca Barnes (2012–13); Margaret "Maggie" Barnes (1919–), daughter of Henry; Jimmy Monahan (1959–), son of Maggie) (1985–87)
  - **John Ross "Jock" Ewing, Sr.** † (1909–82), son of Leander, married Amanda Lewis (1927–30), Eleanor Southworth (Note: Southworth family branch: Enoch Southworth † (1800s–1901), married Eleanor (1890s–1901); Aaron Southworth † (1891–1959), son of Enoch and Eleanor, married Barbara (1910s–1953); Garrison Southworth † (1912–79), son of Aaron and Barbara, married Cherie Simmons (1930s); Eleanor "Miss Ellie" Southworth † (1915–2011), daughter of Aaron and Barbara, married John Ross Ewing, Sr. (1936–82), Clayton Farlow (1984–99); John Ross "J.R." Ewing, Jr. † (1936–2013), son of Jock and Ellie, married Sue Ellen Shepard (1971–81, 1982–88), Cally Harper (1988–91); James Richard Beaumont (1968–), son of J.R. and Vanessa Beaumont, married Debra Lynn Warren (1989), Michelle Stevens (1991); James Richard "Jimmy" Beaumont, Jr. (1989–), son of James and Debra; John Ross Ewing III (1979–), son of J.R. and Sue Ellen Ewing, married Pamela Rebecca Barnes (2013–); J.R. and Cally's son (1991–); J.R.'s daughter; Garrison Arthur "Gary" Ewing (1943–), son of Jock and Ellie, married Valene Clements (1961–62, 1979–83, 1991–), Abby Fairgate (1983–87); Lucy Ewing (1962–), daughter of Gary and Val, married Mitch Cooper (1981–82, 1985–89); Robert James "Bobby" Ewing II and Elizabeth "Betsy" Ewing (1984–), twins of Gary and Val; Molly Whittaker (1994–), illegitimate daughter of Gary and Kate Whittaker; Bobby James Ewing (1949–), son of Jock and Ellie, married Pamela Barnes (1978–83, 1986–87), April Stevens (1990), Ann Smith (2005–); Christopher Ewing (1981–), illegitimate son of Kristin Shepard and Jeff Farraday, adopted by Bobby and Pam, married Pamela Rebecca Barnes (2012–13); Lucas Krebbs (1987–), illegitimate son of Bobby and Jenna, adopted by Ray) (1936–82)
    - **John Ross "J.R." Ewing, Jr.** † (1939–2013), son of Jock and Ellie, married Sue Ellen Shepard (1971–81, 1982–88), Cally Harper (1988–91)
      - **James Richard Beaumont** (1968–), son of J.R. and Vanessa Beaumont, married Debra Lynn Warren (1989), Michelle Stevens (1991)
        - James Richard "Jimmy" Beaumont, Jr. (1989–), son of James and Debra
      - **John Ross Ewing III** (1979–), son of J.R. and Sue Ellen Shepard, married Pamela Rebecca Barnes (2013–)
      - J.R. and Cally's son (1991–)
      - J.R.'s daughter
    - **Garrison Arthur "Gary" Ewing** (1943–), son of Jock and Ellie, married Valene Clements (1961–62, 1979–83, 1991–), Abby Fairgate (1983–87)
      - **Lucy Ewing** (1962–), daughter of Gary and Val, married Mitch Cooper (1981–82, 1985–89)
      - Robert James "Bobby" Ewing II and Elizabeth "Betsy" Ewing (1984–), twins of Gary and Val
      - Molly Whittaker (1994–), illegitimate daughter of Gary and Kate Whittaker
    - **Raymond "Ray" Krebbs** (1944–), illegitimate son of Jock and Margaret Hunter, married Donna McCullum (1981–87), Jenna Wade (1987–)
      - Margaret Krebbs (1987–), daughter of Ray and Donna
    - **Bobby James Ewing** (1949–), son of Jock and Ellie, married Pamela Barnes (1978–83, 1986–87), April Stevens (1990), Ann Smith (2005–)
      - **Christopher Ewing** (1981–), illegitimate son of Kristin Shepard and Jeff Farraday, adopted by Bobby and Pam, married Pamela Rebecca Barnes (2012–13)
      - Lucas Krebbs (1987–), illegitimate son of Bobby and Jenna, adopted by Ray

Family branches

== Southworth family ==
Although the generations of the Ewing family beyond Jock and Jason have not been referred to in the series beyond a fleeting reference to their father, Leander, Miss Ellie's family - the Southworths - is somewhat more explored.

Enoch Southworth founded Southfork Ranch in 1858. Following Enoch's death in 1901, his sole child, a son Aaron, born in the 1870s, had Southfork Ranch signed over to him and carried on his father's legacy. Aaron and his wife Barbara had two children: son Garrison and daughter Eleanor, who eventually became known as Miss Ellie. Miss Ellie was the sweetheart of Willard "Digger" Barnes in the first half of the Great Depression. In 1936, Miss Ellie married Jock Ewing, who helped Aaron save Southfork Ranch from bankruptcy. Aaron died in 1959, and Garrison in 1979. Garrison dated and later married Cherie Simmons (in the television movie The Early Years), but it is unknown if the couple had any children.

== Family tree ==
Enoch Southworth	Eleanor Southworth
Aaron Southworth	Barbara Southworth	Leander Ewing
Cherie Simmons	Garrison Southworth	Eleanor "Miss Ellie" Southworth	John Ross "Jock" Ewing Sr.	Margaret Hunter Krebbs	Amos Krebbs	Jason Ewing	Nancy Shaw
Calpurnia Elizabeth "Cally" Harper	Sue Ellen Shepard	John Ross "J.R." Ewing Jr.	Vanessa Beaumont	Donna McCullum Culver	Raymond "Ray" Krebbs	Jenna Wade Marchetta	Robert James "Bobby" Ewing I	Pamela Jean "Pam" Barnes	Kate Whittaker	Garrison Arthur "Gary" Ewing	Valene "Val" Clements	Jack Jay Ewing	April Stevens	Clifford "Cliff" Barnes	Jamie Ewing
Unnamed son	John Ross Ewing III	Debra Lynn Warren	James Richard Beaumont Sr.	Michelle Louise Stevens	Margaret Krebbs	Lucas Wade-Krebbs (adopted by Ray)	Christopher Ewing (adopted)	Pamela Rebecca Barnes	Molly Whittaker	Mitchell "Mitch" Cooper	Lucy Ann Ewing	Robert James "Bobby" Ewing II	Elizabeth "Betsy" Ewing
James Richard "Jimmy" Beaumont Jr.

== Ewing Oil ==
Ewing Oil
- Industry: Oil
- Founded: 1930
- Founder: Jock Ewing
- Defunct: 1999
- Fate: Ceased operation
- Headquarters: Dallas, Texas, United States
- Key people: Jock Ewing; J.R. Ewing; Bobby Ewing; Cliff Barnes
- Products: Fuels and Lubricants
- Net income: $50,000,000 (as of 1998)
- Total assets: Southfork Ranch (Reorganized after Asian fiasco; now a personal asset of the Ewings)
- Owners: Bobby Ewing; Sue Ellen Ewing
- Parent: De La Vega Oil (1990–91)
- Subsidiaries: Ewing Construction; Ewing Alternative Energy; Kinsmet Press; Needham Enterprises; Lassator Solar Industries

Ewing Oil is a fictional oil company from the television series Dallas.

Jock Ewing founded Ewing Oil in 1930 and ran it until 1977, when he retired as President.

Several years prior to the debut of Dallas, J.R. Ewing had returned home to Southfork after serving in Vietnam and became vice-president of Ewing Oil.

When Jock retired, J.R. became President of Ewing Oil. Bobby Ewing returned to Dallas and joined the executive management team. J.R. resented his presence and wanted him out of the way. Things came to a head at the end of 1978, when Bobby resigned from Ewing Oil and started up Ewing Construction.

When Cliff Barnes, the son of Jock's rival Digger Barnes, became Commissioner of the Office of Land Management, he used his position to declare war on the Ewings and Ewing Oil. He halted the new drilling sites of Ewing Oil and began shutting down the oil fields. J.R. quickly had to find a new source of income. J.R. invested $200,000,000 in offshore leases in Asia and remortgaged Southfork Ranch to do this. The wells came in as one of the biggest oil strikes in the world, making the Ewing family even wealthier.

However, Jock was so upset over J.R.'s remortgaging of Southfork Ranch that Bobby stepped in to help run Ewing Oil. J.R. had gotten word that problems were escalating in Asia so he decided to sell 75% of the Asian leases to members of the Cartel (a small group of independent oil companies who work together for mutual benefit) - Seth Stone, Jordan Lee, Wade Luce and Andy Bradley - as well as banker Vaughn Leland, all bought shares. The next day there was a political revolt in Asia and the wells were nationalized. The investors lost everything, sending them all near bankruptcy, though J.R. had minimized his losses by selling most of his shares. Seth Stone could not bear to tell his wife Marilee that he had nearly bankrupted her father's company, and killed himself. Jock and Bobby believed that J.R. knew the wells were going to be nationalized, and that the Cartel had been double crossed, but J.R. denied that he knew anything prior to the nationalization.

Bobby decided to leave Dallas after Jock supported J.R. shutting down a Ewing field to prevent Cliff Barnes from gaining any profit from the field (Cliff discovered a document that proved his father owned half of the field). One night in the spring of 1980, J.R. was shot at the Ewing offices. Among the suspects were the various Cartel members whom J.R. had swindled, Cliff Barnes, and J.R's wife, Sue Ellen, although it turned out to be Sue Ellen's sister, former Ewing Oil secretary Kristin Shepard, who had done it. While J.R. was in surgery, Bobby was made president of Ewing Oil.

Bobby moved very fast and was eager to prove he was smarter and better than J.R. at running Ewing Oil, but encountered numerous obstacles in the business community. Bobby made several business decisions including changing banks and selling Ewing assets to buy a refinery, all while not consulting Jock or J.R. about any deals. Jock and J.R. became very close during this time and Jock regretted that he ever made Bobby president of Ewing Oil.

Bobby committed Ewing Oil to a deal with the Cartel, the first business Ewing Oil had done with them since the Asian deal and it was important for the relationship to continue. But unbeknown to Bobby, Jock had taken $12,000,000 out of the Ewing Oil account to go into a business deal with Punk Anderson. Bobby eventually pulled the deal off via a loan but had a terrible fight with Jock and decided to quit Ewing Oil, and later became a state senator.

Jock reinstated J.R. as president and his first move was to improve both his and Ewing Oil's public image, so he hired public relations specialist Leslie Stewart. J.R. secretly financed the overthrow of the new government that nationalized the Asian wells and the country's new rulers returned the oil wells to their Texas owners. The Cartel and Jock were thrilled but Cliff Barnes uncovered J.R.'s plot and tried to have him prosecuted but failed.

After his wife Sue Ellen left Southfork and moved in with Dusty Farlow at Southern Cross Ranch in San Angelo, J.R. began stock-piling all of the oil that went to Farlow Refineries as a way to force Sue Ellen to come back to him with their son, John Ross. This put a great strain on the Ewing finances as the price of oil dropped and J.R. was stuck with a load of oil he couldn't get rid of.

In 1982, Jock was killed in a helicopter crash in South America. Just prior to this, as an interim measure in his absence, Jock gave his family the power to control the company with voting shares which were divided as follows:

Miss Ellie Ewing (30%)
J.R. Ewing (20%)
Bobby Ewing (20%)
John Ross Ewing III (10%) (Ellie voted them if he was living off of Southfork, J.R. if he was living on Southfork)
Gary Ewing (10%) (which he gave to Lucy)
Ray Krebbs (10%)

J.R.'s plan to ruin the Farlows was stopped when Miss Ellie stepped in and made a deal with Clayton Farlow. Furious at J.R., she persuaded the family to vote with her to have him removed as president but changed her mind when J.R. pointed out nobody else could run Ewing Oil alone. However, when Miss Ellie later learned that J.R. had used Ewing Oil to ruin Cliff Barnes (resulting in his attempted suicide), the family voted unanimously to remove J.R. as president and Bobby took over again.

Some months later, Jock Ewing's will was finally read which stated that Ewing Oil would be split 50-50 between J.R. and Bobby and would run half each as a separate company for a period of one year. At the end of the year, the brother with the greatest profit would inherit 51% of the company and the loser would get 19%. The remainder would go to Miss Ellie, Ray and Gary who would inherit 10% each. Bobby's route was to drill in frozen ground in Canada using a new, experimental Tundra Torque drill bit. J.R.'s route was to over-pump oil with a special variance from the OLM (which he obtained through blackmail), refine it and open a chain of cut-price gas stations.

The battle for Ewing Oil tore the family apart. Bobby and Pam divorced; and Cliff and Pamela's mother, Rebecca Wentworth, died in a plane crash in an attempt to stop J.R. from winning. In the fall of 1983, J.R. and Bobby decided to call the battle off and divide their shares equally regardless of who won the contest. When it initially appeared that J.R. was the winner, he was about to double-cross Bobby and take control of Ewing Oil, but at the last moment Bobby won the contest when his Canadian project struck oil. Bobby kept his word and allowed J.R. to have an equal share in the company and the brothers would run the company side by side. Ownership of Ewing Oil was now as follows:

J.R.: 35%
Bobby: 35%
Lucy: 10%
Miss Ellie: 10%
Ray: 10%

In 1984, Bobby was shot at the office by Katherine Wentworth, Pam's half-sister who was in love with him. During his recovery, Donna Krebbs stepped into his place, much to the annoyance of J.R.

Jamie Ewing, Jock's niece, turned up at Southfork Ranch from Alaska, where she had been working in the oil business. Her father Jason, Jock's brother, had died and Jamie had a document which proved that Ewing Oil was in fact owned by Jock, Digger Barnes and Jason. Jamie married Cliff Barnes and they sided to take the Ewings to court for their rightful shares in Ewing Oil. The case went to court and the Ewings had a fight on their hands to keep control. Jamie's brother, Jack, came to Dallas and went to J.R. and Bobby to reveal that he had proof that Ewing Oil was owned outright by Jock Ewing. But there was a price for this information, Jack wanted 10% of Ewing Oil. The Ewing family agreed and Jack took Ray, Bobby and J.R. to meet a man called Wally Wyndham. He had witnessed the dissolving of the partnership and revealed that the document was with Jock's first wife, Amanda Ewing. The family met with Amanda, retrieved the document and won the battle for control. The company was now owned as follows:

J.R.: 30%
Bobby: 30%
Lucy:10%
Miss Ellie:10%
Ray:10%
Jack: 10%

By 1986, the price of oil dropped dramatically, the Middle East flooded the market with their oil, sending the price of crude oil down to an all-time low. It was beneficial for WestStar, but disastrous for independents like Ewing Oil. J.R. was forced to shut down many fields, causing a great deal of unemployment. An Ewing employee named Scotfield lost his job and, in his anger, he blew up a well, was later arrested and committed suicide. Mrs Scotfield, his widow, wanted revenge and told Bobby that "one day a big fish like Ewing Oil is gonna get eaten up and swallowed whole by an even bigger fish."

By this time, Jack Ewing's ex-wife April Stevens had arrived in Dallas to claim half of Jack's 10% share of Ewing Oil as per the terms of their divorce settlement. Jack maliciously sold his 10% share to Jamie for $1 so April would only get 50 cents, but after Jamie died without leaving a signed will, her husband Cliff Barnes inherited it, finally giving him a piece of the Ewing's company, much to J.R.'s chagrin. Jack and the Ewings went to court to nullify the sale Jack made to Jamie but were only partly successful as the judge decided that only April's half of Jack's 10% was sold fraudulently but Jack's own half was not and therefore Cliff got to keep 5% of Ewing oil. As April agreed to sell her share back to J.R. and Bobby, the company was now divided as follows:

J.R.: 32.5%
Bobby: 32.5%
Lucy:10%
Miss Ellie:10%
Ray:10%
Cliff: 5%

The same year, J.R. wanted the price of American crude to rise and he met with mercenary B.D. Calhoun whom he paid to go to the Middle East and start trouble by blowing up oil wells. However, the CIA had Calhoun under surveillance and made this known to J.R. who tried to call the deal off, but Calhoun refused to stop. J.R. informed the CIA as to Calhoun's mission, and the mission failed, with Calhoun's mercenaries dying in the process. Calhoun blamed J.R. and set out to exact revenge. He kidnapped John Ross and threatened to kill him, but Ray shot Calhoun in time. The CIA decided on a cover up to keep their involvement secret. However, Mrs Scotfield's brother worked at the CIA's archives as a clerk. He stumbled upon information revealing J.R.'s involvement with Calhoun, which was a federal crime. Mrs. Scotfield then gave the story to a small town paper which printed it and opened the biggest can of worms J.R. was ever to see. Jeremy Wendell of WestStar wanted Ewing Oil's assets. He made Mrs. Scotfield a rich woman, for which she gave him the evidence he needed to destroy Ewing Oil. The Ewings finally lost Ewing Oil in 1987 when the Justice Department shut the company down after J.R.'s criminal activities were exposed and all of its assets were sold to WestStar Oil.

In 1988, Bobby obtained the right to use the Ewing Oil name again. At the same time, J.R. blackmailed Jeremy Wendell and re-acquired the former Ewing Oil assets from WestStar Oil. He and Bobby agreed to merge their holdings, effectively resurrecting Ewing Oil.

In 1989, Bobby invited Cliff Barnes to become a partner in Ewing Oil after Cliff sold his own company, Barnes-Wentworth, and Bobby, J.R. and Cliff ran Ewing Oil together. After his new wife April died in 1990, Bobby decided to leave Ewing Oil, as he blamed the oil business for her death. Later J.R. sold his Ewing Oil shares to Cliff Barnes, because he was planning to take over WestStar Oil. J.R.'s plot didn't succeed and he lost control of both Ewing Oil and WestStar on the same day. At the end of the original series in 1991, Cliff Barnes had become sole owner of Ewing Oil.

In the 1996 TV movie Dallas: J.R. Returns, Cliff Barnes sold Ewing Oil to Bobby and Sue Ellen. In the 1998 TV movie Dallas: War Of The Ewings, J.R. managed to wrangle his way back into Ewing Oil to become partners with Bobby and Sue Ellen.

In the revived Dallas series (which ignores the two 1990s Dallas TV movies), Ewing Oil has ceased to exist after being absorbed into Barnes Global, a multinational conglomerate owned by Cliff Barnes. However, John Ross Ewing III briefly started an oil company under the name Ewing Oil, but this was not the same company that his grandfather Jock Ewing had founded and that his father J.R. had inherited and worked in. Later, the Ewings would start the company Ewing Energies as a successor to Ewing Oil.

== Ewing Energies ==
Ewing Energies
- Company type: Corporation
- Industry: Oil; Alternative Energy
- Predecessor: Ewing Oil (John Ross III's company, not the original company); Ewing Alternative Energy (Christopher's company)
- Founded: 2012
- Founders: John Ross Ewing III, Bobby Ewing, Christopher Ewing, & Elena Ramos
- Fate: merged
- Successor: Ewing Global (result of a merger between Ewing Energies & Barnes Global)
- Headquarters: Dallas, Texas, United States
- Key people: John Ross Ewing III; Christopher Ewing; Bobby Ewing; Sue Ellen Ewing
- Products: Fuels & Lubricants; Gas Hydrates
- Owners: John Ross Ewing III; Christopher Ewing; Bobby Ewing; Sue Ellen Ewing; Pamela Rebecca Ewing
- Subsidiaries: Oil Rigs; Cartwell Trucking

Ewing Energies is a fictional company in the revived Dallas series. The company Ewing Energies was started by John Ross Ewing, Christopher Ewing, Elena Ramos, and Bobby Ewing. John Ross continues the Ewing tradition in the oil industry while Christopher works on new gas hydrates technology. Because of John Ross and Elena's works on new oil drilling technology, the oil pulled from wells would be used to bankroll a new gas hydrates technology developed by Christopher and Elena's collaboration.

When John Ross was attacked while in police custody for the suspected murder of Veronica Martinez aka Marta Del Sol, Christopher signed over exclusive South American rights to his technology to John Ross's former business partner, Vicente Cano. Vicente's part of the deal was to provide video tape evidence that would clear John Ross. By doing this, Christopher also prevented Bobby from having to drill on Southfork to protect John Ross from Vicente. It is discovered in the season finale that before his arrest for his hand in the fraudulent Southfork sale, Vicente was about to sell off his South American rights to Cliff Barnes.

In Season 2, Ewing Energies has been opened. Elena was given 5% from each board member to even out the board. Sue Ellen had recently given Elena a loan for drilling, but she buckled down on Elena before she could start pumping. This forced Elena out of Ewing Energies and Sue Ellen gladly took her place. Around this same time, Pamela demanded 10% of the company which had to do with the annulment of her and Christopher's marriage. Pamela took 10% of Christopher which dropped Christopher below John Ross, Bobby, and Sue Ellen. Elena teamed up with her brother Drew and drilled the land he bought from Bobby. The two called their company Ramos Oil.

Early 2012 Ewing Energies Shares:
Bobby Ewing 30%
John Ross Ewing 30%
Christopher Ewing 30%
Elena Ramos 10%

Late 2012 Ewing Energies Shares:
Bobby Ewing 25%
John Ross Ewing 25%
Christopher Ewing 25%
Elena Ramos 25%

Early 2013 Ewing Energies Shares:
Bobby Ewing 25%
John Ross Ewing 25%
Christopher Ewing 15%
Sue Ellen Ewing 25%
Pamela Rebecca Barnes 10%

== Ewing Global ==
Ewing Global
- Company type: Conglomerate
- Industry: Oil; Alternative Energy; Consumer Products; Casinos
- Predecessors: Ewing Energies; Barnes Global
- Founded: 2013
- Founder: Barnes Global: Cliff Barnes; Ewing Energies: John Ross Ewing III, Christopher Ewing, Bobby Ewing, and Elena Ramos
- Headquarters: Dallas, Texas, United States
- Key people: Cliff Barnes; Pamela Rebecca Ewing; John Ross Ewing III; Christopher Ewing
- Products: Fuels & Lubricants; Gas Hydrates
- Owners: Bobby Ewing; Sue Ellen Ewing
- Subsidiaries: Oil Rigs; Cartwell Trucking; Over a hundred others

Ewing Global is a fictional company on the updated version of Dallas. Formerly Barnes Global, it is owned by Cliff Barnes, his daughter Pamela (with husband John Ross Ewing), and his nephew Christopher Ewing. Cliff is currently being represented by his hired proxy Nicolas Treviño (a childhood friend of Elena Ramos).

Cliff had built an international conglomerate, Barnes Global, which owned more than 100 subsidiaries in over 50 countries. After the death of J.R. Ewing Cliff conspired with trucking magnate Harris Ryland and Texas governor Sam McConaughey to take down the Ewing family once and for all. Cliff's plan was to sabotage Christopher's technology demonstration on the gas rig, causing the state to levy a billion dollar fine against Ewing Energies. Meanwhile, Governor McConaughy was to seize the Ewings' oil wells via eminent domain, making it impossible to pay the fine. Cliff bought the debt and knowing the Ewings didn't have the money to pay the fine, took control of Ewing Energies. This is how Barnes Global and Ewing Energies "merged".

The Ewings prevailed thanks to J.R.'s final scheme. Sue Ellen got the first report of the gas rig explosion that proved the rig was sabotaged and the governor intentionally hid the report. She blackmailed the governor into ending the eminent domain on the Ewings' oil wells. Emma stole evidence from her father's safe that linked him to working with a Mexican drug cartel and cocaine trafficking. Christopher got proof that his adoptive mother Pamela Barnes Ewing was dead and he inherited 1/3 of Barnes Global. Cliff's daughter Pamela, who married John Ross, convinced him to give her 1/3 of Barnes Global giving the Ewings control of Barnes Global and Ewing Energies again. Cliff was framed for the murder of J.R. Ewing and was imprisoned in a Mexican jail but he did manage to contact Elena Ramos and revealed that years ago her father had bought some oil-rich land but that J.R. had switched land deeds and her father was left with useless land while J.R. made millions originally belonging to her father. Cliff gave Elena his power of attorney over his third of the company, and told her to exact revenge on the Ewings.

Elena sought help from Joaquin, a close friend who she grew up with in Mexico. In 1997 he changed his name to Nicolas Treviño. He became a billionaire not long after. Elena directed him to Cliff where Nicolas became his proxy for his 1/3 ownership in Barnes Global now Ewing Global. He showed up in Dallas in the season premiere and stopped the Ewings from selling their consumers division to help pay for the arctic leases. Later, Nicholas made a deal with John Ross to have Ewing Global go public. However doing so made the Ewings lose all control of Ewing Global to Nicholas's Mexican cartel. However, Pamela made a deal to buy it back without anyone else, only to learn that Bobby and Sue Ellen had secured the shares of the company from Carlos Del Sol, cutting both her and John Ross out of the company

Ewing Global Shares

Early 2012 Ewing Global Shares:

Cliff Barnes: 99%

Early 2013 Ewing Energies Shares:

Cliff Barnes: 33%
Pamela Rebecca Barnes: 33%
Christopher Ewing: 33%

Late 2013 Ewing Energies/Ewing Global Shares:

Cliff Barnes: 33%
Pamela Rebecca Barnes - John Ross Ewing: 33%
Christopher Ewing: 33%

Early 2014 Ewing Global Shares:

Nicolas Trevino: 33%
Christopher Ewing: 33%
Pamela Rebecca Ewing/John Ross Ewing: 33%
Bobby Ewing: Partner
Sue Ellen Ewing: Partner

Late 2014 Ewing Global Shares

Bobby Ewing: 50%
Sue Ellen Ewing: 50%
