= Pamela Rebecca Barnes =

- Dallas character
- Julie Gonzalo as Pamela Rebecca Barnes
- Portrayed by: Jenna Pangburn (1989); Deborah Kellner (1996); Julie Gonzalo (2012–2014)
- Duration: 1989, 1996, 2012–2014
- First appearance: April 14, 1989; Yellow Brick Road
- Last appearance: September 22, 2014; Brave New World
- Created by: Leonard Katzman
- Spin-off appearances: Dallas: J.R. Returns
In-universe information
- Other names: Pamela Rebecca Cooper; Rebecca Sutter
- Occupation: 1/3 Owner of Ewing Global; Former President of Barnes Global (2012); Law school graduate
- Family: Barnes
- Father: Cliff Barnes
- Mother: Afton Cooper
- Stepfather: Harrison Van Buren III
- Stepmother: Jamie Ewing Barnes; Michelle Stevens
- Spouse: Christopher Ewing (2012–2013); John Ross Ewing III (2013–)
- Grandfathers: Willard "Digger" Barnes
- Grandmothers: Rebecca Barnes Wentworth; Arliss Cooper
- Uncles: Tyler Barnes; Mitch Cooper
- Aunts: Catherine Barnes; Pamela Barnes Ewing; Katherine Wentworth
- First cousins: Christopher Ewing (adoptive)
- Other relatives: Maggie Monahan; Jimmy Monahan

Pamela Rebecca Barnes is a fictional character from TNT's primetime soap opera Dallas, a continuation of the original series of the same name which aired on CBS from 1978 to 1991. Rebecca was portrayed by actress Julie Gonzalo, and appeared on the show since its pilot episode, which first aired on June 13, 2012. The daughter of Cliff Barnes (Ken Kercheval) and Afton Cooper (Audrey Landers), the character originated in two episodes of the original series' season 12, and also appeared in the TV reunion movie Dallas: J.R. Returns (which is not regarded as canon by the 2012 series). Pamela Rebecca was named after both her half-aunt, Pamela Barnes Ewing (Victoria Principal), and grandmother, Rebecca Barnes Wentworth (Priscilla Pointer).

== Storyline ==
=== Original Series ===
Pamela Rebecca is born off-screen in Dallas in 1985, as the daughter of Cliff Barnes and Afton Cooper. At the time of Rebecca's birth, Afton had left Dallas, and Cliff wasn't aware of her existence until 1989, when she appeared in the season 12 episodes "Yellow Brick Road" and "The Sound of Money". As Afton didn't want to acknowledge Cliff as the father of Pamela (at the time called "Pammie"), they soon leave Dallas again.

=== Dallas (2012 TV series) ===
Season 1
Pamela (using the alias "Rebecca Sutter") meets Christopher Ewing as part of a scheme along with her boyfriend Tommy to infiltrate the Ewing family. Tommy pretends he is "Rebecca's" brother and soon Christopher falls in love with Pamela and they get married. She becomes pregnant with twins. Christopher's ex-fiancée Elena Ramos begins dating John Ross Ewing III in the meantime. Soon, it is revealed that Pamela no longer wants to manipulate the Ewings, as she has fallen in love with Christopher, but Tommy threatens her. Later, in self-defense, Pamela shoots and kills Tommy, hiding the body. But the truth is revealed to everyone. Christopher files for divorce and lets Pamela know he will have her arrested and take her kids from her. He then gets engaged to Elena, who ended her engagement with John Ross because of his lies. It is revealed that Pamela is the daughter of Cliff Barnes and Afton Cooper in the season finale. She vows to her father that she will take down the Ewings and not let her heart get in the way this time.

Season 2
Pamela schemes with John Ross to steal Ewing Energies from Christopher and Elena, but they eventually start sleeping together. However, their "relationship" ends when their fathers learn of this and disapprove. Their deal also ends when Christopher learns she got 10% of Ewing Energies and wants to make peace with Ewing family. Nevertheless, Christopher saves her from being set up by Frank, her co-worker. By now, John Ross has fallen in love with her. When John Ross attempts to make nice with her, he invites her to the rig to celebrate Christopher's success. However, Cliff Barnes and Harris Ryland arrange for the rig to be blown up, blackmailing Drew Ramos to do so. After the explosion, Pamela is rushed to the hospital for emergency surgery. Pamela suffers from an aortic aneurysm and she miscarries the twins. When J.R. informs her of Cliff's involvement in the explosion that killed their babies, Pamela refuses to believe it. She eventually discovers the truth when Cliff refers to her children as "collateral damage". She convinces her father to give her her Aunt Katherine's percentage in Barnes Global. Rebecca and John Ross marry in the episode "Love & Family" in order to ensure that John Ross has access to her shares in Cliff's company, but she makes it clear that she is marrying him for both love and revenge on Cliff.

Season 3

== Casting and creation (2012 series) ==
In 2010, TNT (sister company to Warner Bros. Television, the current copyright owners of the series) announced they were producing a new updated Dallas series. It is a continuation of the original series and primarily centers around Sue Ellen and J.R.'s son John Ross Ewing III, and Bobby Ewing and Pam's adopted son Christopher Ewing, though various stars of the original series will be reprising their roles. Former cast members Larry Hagman, Linda Gray, and Patrick Duffy all agreed to return to the show and portray their original characters. Gray (Sue Ellen Ewing) commented: "We’re like the kids on Harry Potter. We’re going back to Hogwarts!"
