= John Ross Ewing III =

Fictional TV character, DALLAS

- Dallas character
- Josh Henderson as John Ross Ewing
- Portrayed by: Tyler Banks (1979–1983); Omri Katz (1983–1996); Josh Henderson (2012–2014)
- Duration: 1979–1991, 1996, 2012–2014
- First appearance: September 21, 1979; Whatever Happened to Baby John?, Part I
- Last appearance: September 22, 2014; Brave New World
- Created by: David Jacobs
- Spin-off appearances: Dallas: J.R. Returns
In-universe information
- Occupation: 1/3 Owner of Ewing Global (2013–); Co-Owner of Southfork Ranch (2013–); Partner in Ewing Energies (2012–2013); CEO of Ewing Oil (2009–2012)
- Family: Ewing
- Father: J. R. Ewing
- Mother: Sue Ellen Ewing
- Stepfather: Don Lockwood
- Stepmother: Cally Harper Ewing
- Half-brothers: James Beaumont; Unnamed son from J.R. and Cally
- Half-sisters: Unnamed daughter from J. R. and an unknown woman
- Wife: Pamela Barnes (2013–)
- Grandfathers: Jock Ewing
- Grandmothers: Patricia Shepard; Miss Ellie Ewing
- Uncles: Gary Ewing; Bobby Ewing; Ray Krebbs
- Aunts: Kristin Shepard
- Nephews: Jimmy Beaumont
- First cousins: Lucy Ewing; Bobby Ewing II; Betsy Ewing; Molly Whittaker; Christopher Ewing; Lucas Krebbs; Margaret Krebbs

John Ross Ewing III is a fictional character from the American prime time soap opera Dallas and its 2012 continuation series. The character was first written into the series in the episode named "John Ewing III: Part 2" which first aired on April 6, 1979. Omri Katz played the role in the series from 1983 until its conclusion in 1991 and also in the subsequent follow-up movie Dallas: J.R. Returns. In the continuation series, actor Josh Henderson stepped into the role. John Ross is the son and namesake of the show's most iconic character, J.R. Ewing, and his longtime love, Sue Ellen Ewing.

The continuation series focuses on John Ross's feud with his cousin Christopher as they disagree over how to restore the Ewing name to its former glory. Tensions also arise between the cousins due to John Ross' romance with Christopher's ex-fiancée, Elena Ramos. At the same time, John Ross does his best to live up to his father's legend, using every dirty trick in the book to get what he wants. However, John Ross still has a few lessons to learn and J.R. returns to Southfork to teach him. John Ross uses his resentment toward Sue Ellen and her guilt to manipulate her, but his father is a different story. When John Ross's schemes culminate in the end of his relationship with Elena, he teams up with- and later winds up falling for and marrying Christopher's ex-wife, Pamela Rebecca Barnes, the daughter of J.R.'s nemesis, Cliff Barnes and their union is reminiscent of John Ross's uncle Bobby Ewing's marriage to Cliff's half-sister and Pamela's namesake Pamela Barnes Ewing. However, their relationship has the potential to be very dysfunctional, similar to the relationship between John Ross's parents. With the death of Larry Hagman and his character J.R. in 2012 and 2013, respectively, Henderson's John Ross is pushed to the forefront as the main protagonist of the series.

TV Source viewed Henderson's John Ross as an "arrogant playboy that's been slightly humbled by his previous mistakes," which makes him smarter about his choices. TV Guide described John Ross as "a chip off the old block," referencing his similarities to J.R. Michael Fairman said John Ross is "deliciously sinister" and said, "He seems to be the catalyst that makes the new Dallas go!" "John Ross is the sexy bad guy you can't get enough of and you secretly root for" said Dani Lyman.

== Creation ==
=== Background ===
Over the years, John has had very little contact with J.R. thanks to Sue Ellen's efforts. John Ross harbors some resentment towards both of his parents: towards J.R. for not having been around much when he was young, and towards Sue Ellen for having kept him tucked away in boarding schools for most of his life. The producers were inspired by Henderson's own life as a singer and songwriter to come up with John Ross's back story for the last 20 years. Henderson told Access Hollywood that John Ross decided not to attend college. Instead, he traveled to Nashville to pursue a career in music. Though it has yet to be mentioned, or discussed onscreen, it appears that John Ross's music career was not a success. At the beginning of the continuation series, John Ross is in his prime and it is the perfect time for him to make a name for himself as a businessman; however, John Ross only knows how to do business his father's way, which he believes is the best way. Because he doesn't have strong relationships with his parents, John Ross is on his own. Though he would like to "confide in his mother," he is not comfortable with it. John Ross is all about leaving his mark on the world and the Ewing legacy as a whole. John Ross believes he should be the next Ewing to lead the family. "He knows how to do business one way and that's the J.R. way. You kind of can't blame him" Henderson said of John Ross. Within the series, Henderson's John Ross so naturally refers to Linda Gray's Sue Ellen as "Mama," because that is how Henderson actually refers to Gray. John Ross is defined by who J.R. is.

=== Casting ===
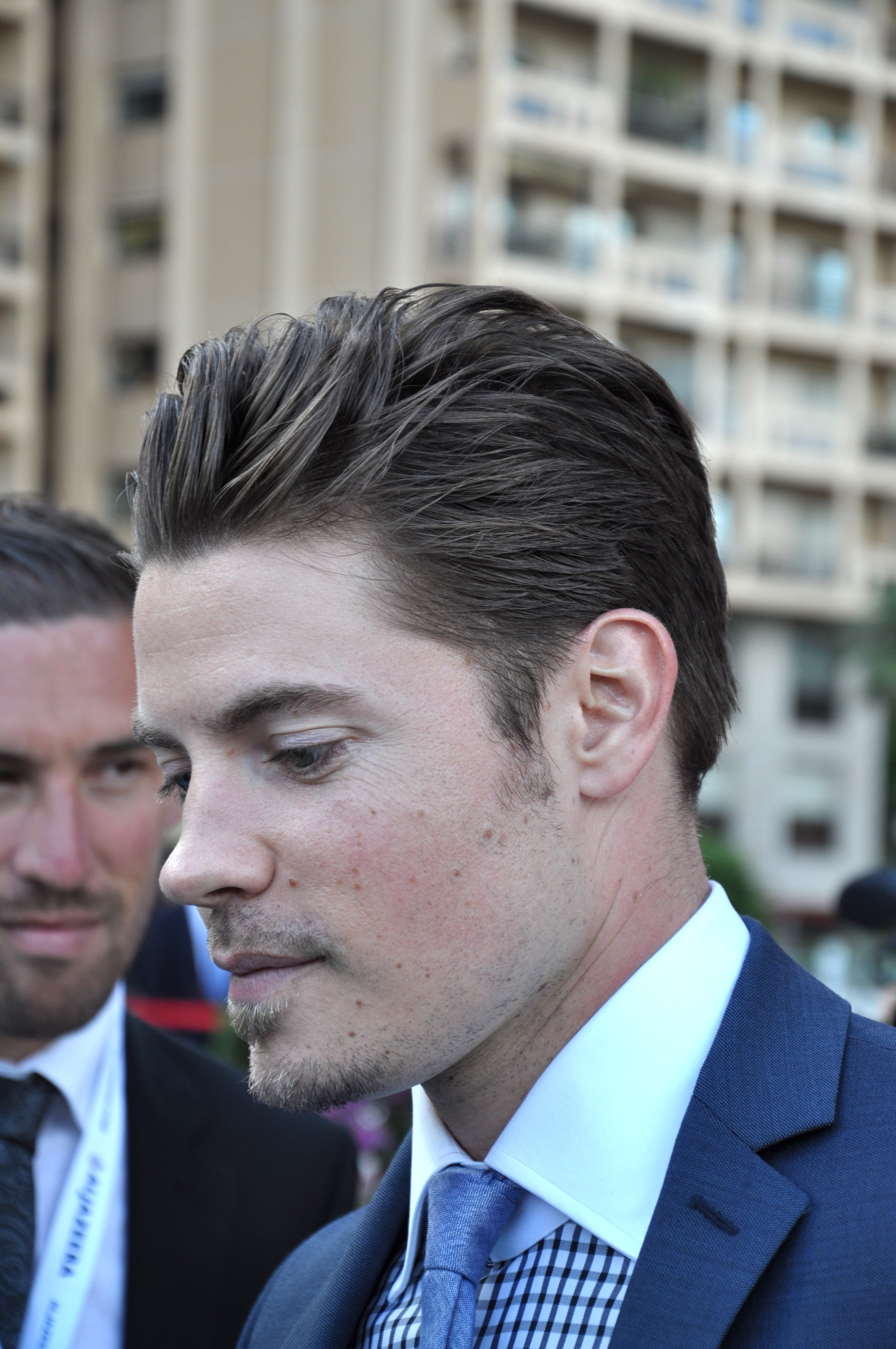
Executive producer Cynthia Cidre knew Henderson was right for the role after his second line in the audition.

The character appears on-screen as an infant on September 21, 1979, in the episode "Whatever Happened to Baby John?, Part 1", portrayed by Tyler Banks. From 1983, the role was played solely by child actor Omri Katz, who played the character until the series' conclusion in 1991. Katz also appeared in the 1996 reunion film for the series Dallas: J.R. Returns, reuniting him with several former castmates from the original series. With the decision to continue Dallas on the TNT network, plans to recast were confirmed. In February 2011, the role was recast and actor Josh Henderson had signed on to appear in the role of John Ross for the continuation series. Henderson, who was born in the city of Dallas, but raised in Oklahoma expected the role to fit him perfectly. When it was announced the continuation was a go, Henderson urged his agents to get him an audition. Henderson went in for the first audition with his own idea about what the character would be like in the present day, he was quickly offered a screen test and immediately cast in the role.

=== Characterization ===
"He’s a very complex person; he’s got a lot of issues, and he grew up with not the best relationship with his parents. He has a lot of chips on his shoulders and now, obviously, with what he’s gone through of trying to prove his worth, prove that he can make his father proud and be like his father in business and blackmail, and do all those things that J.R. was so good at. He’s going through so much emotionally in season two that we’re going to see many more colors to him. As an actor, this is just an amazing opportunity."

— Henderson on John Ross

The character of John Ross is very layered. "He's a very, very passionate guy," Henderson said of the character. John Ross has a certain kind of intensity about him. John Ross treats life as a game of chess and does his best to stay a step ahead of everyone. "[John Ross] also wants to one-up J.R." and at the same time, make him proud. "I'm actually nothing like John Ross in that kind of conniving attitude…" Henderson said as he explained the differences between himself and his character. "I don't see John Ross as a bad guy," Henderson said. According to Henderson, the character is very "determined" and understands what he wants. Henderson also described the character as a schemer who is willing to stoop to any low to get what he wants. Whenever John Ross feels trapped, he uses "charm and manipulation" to get what he wants. Taking advice from Hagman himself, Henderson's John Ross relishes being bad and savors every moment of it. "Whether John Ross is headed into a corner or he's trying to get under someone's skin," John Ross views everything as a "challenge." Even when John Ross is hurting, he puts on a "front" as though he's got everything under control.

== Development ==
"I feel like I know exactly how he would respond to everything that’s in his way. I know how he would say things. I really understand him and I have grown with him. I’m on my fourth version of John Ross right now. At the beginning he was very much, ‘I need to prove myself. I need to prove my worth. I want to make my father proud. I love Elena. I’m doing these things and I’m a little torn because I care for Elena and I don’t want to lose her.’ When Elena’s mother gives him the [engagement] ring back, everything is just BOOM! That John Ross is dead. Now he’s on a mission and he tells his father, ‘If you screw me over I will put you back in that home where you belong.’ Every one was his enemy.

Now cut to season two, it’s been about a month’s time he has chilled off. Now this is the third version of John Ross. He’s trying to keep his cool because he knows that if he flies under the radar and he can hit people unexpectedly, that’ll be better for him than just going in guns blazing. Obviously when JR passes it’s a brand new John Ross all over again. You’re going to see him change and to continue to change and evolve, which is great as an actor, it’s just sad that these circumstances are what they are."

— Henderson on John Ross's evolution.

=== Feud and triangle ===
The central plot for the continuation focuses on the feud between J.R. and Bobby's sons, John Ross and Christopher (Jesse Metcalfe). With John Ross "stuck in his father's old-school ways," and Christopher's new innovative approach, their being on opposing sides provides "great intensity." From the first episode in the continuation, John Ross and Christopher are at one another's throats as they nearly come to blows at Christopher's wedding. Their feud and cousin and sibling rivalry is passed on by JR and Bobby Ewing who has been feuding over their oil company for years. "[The cousins] are just two bulldogs going at each other" Henderson said of his character's feud with Christopher. John Ross disagrees with Christopher who wants the family to invest in alternative energy sources; John Ross is a staunch supporter of oil. John Ross sincerely believes that oil is the only way which immediately pits him at odds with Christopher. "… John Ross thinks that is ridiculous." In addition to feuding over business, the two are embroiled in a love triangle with Jordana Brewster's Elena Ramos. John Ross "totally loves Elena" Henderson said. While he manipulates everyone else in his life, John Ross hopes Elena can serve as his way to escape from the scheming and manipulation. However, Elena has trouble with John Ross's business tactics. Despite his love for Elena, John Ross is also having an affair with Veronica Martinez (Leonor Varela). John Ross sees her as someone who can do his bidding for him, but he truly loves Elena. In season 1 John Ross focuses on trying to impress his father while maintaining his relationship with Elena and achieving his goal of taking over the family empire. "He goes through a lot, and stuff gets really intense" Henderson said when asked to give a preview of the season. However, by the end of season 1, the relationship is over and Elena chooses Christopher, leaving John Ross enraged and wanting revenge. In season 2, John Ross is bound to make mistakes because he is still "licking his wounds" following his split with Elena. A brokenhearted John Ross is using the debt Elena owes to his mother to manipulate her and those around him. Henderson said that John Ross is still about gaining control of the newly formed Ewing Energies, but he has to fly under the radar. However, he is definitely planning something big. John Ross must contain his emotions to get what he wants. According to Henderson, John Ross's main focus at the beginning of the season is exacting revenge on Christopher and Elena. However, his main goal is gaining control of the company. Henderson admits that John Ross is a bit jealous of Christopher's relationship with Bobby because his relationship with his father is a "contentious" one. Without Elena, John Ross has no one to keep him grounded.

=== Relationship with J.R. ===
From a very young age, John Ross has always wanted to be like his father. But he wants most in life is to "make his father proud." In the series premiere of the continuation, John Ross gets the upper hand on J.R. which allows for viewers to understand that John Ross is just as tricky as his father. John Ross's dynamic with his father is more of a chess game as opposed to his feud with Christopher. John Ross and J.R. spend most of the season trying to stay a step ahead of one another. John Ross knows that if can "get one over" on his father, J.R. would be proud. It's an ongoing battle. During this game of one upmanship John Ross and J.R. begin to build the relationship that they never had when he was a child. So when John Ross suddenly doesn't have his father anymore, John Ross goes on a "dark mission." Though his time with J.R. is cut short, John Ross takes what J.R. does teach him and decides to build on it. John Ross puts on a "front" as if he tries to convince himself that he is "just as conniving and slick" as his father; however, once he goes down this path, he realizes he needs J.R. more than he thought. John Ross is left asking the question, 'Why did you leave me?" Without his father, John Ross is filled with "passion and resentment" from the pain he feels for not having his father when he was young, and still needing his father. John Ross gets to a point where he is no longer concerned for his own well-being. Henderson revealed to Soaps In Depth, "He's on a mission, and he's not going to let anybody get in his way." However, John Ross's biggest obstacle is living up to the legend of J.R. Ewing. But, he is not confident in his ability to accomplish that task. Speaking in character, Henderson said "I don't have my Pops anymore. He's not here to tell me when I'm about to make a mistake." According to Henderson, John Ross will come to understand that his father is still with him. "With everything John Ross does in the future he'll hear his father's voice."

=== Relationship with Pamela ===
In addition to teaching him about his ruthless business tactics, John Ross learned a lot about the opposite sex from watching J.R. Growing up, John Ross is very aware of how unhealthy his parents' relationship is, so he never takes much from it. In late January 2013, Julie Gonzalo revealed that John Ross and Pamela would develop a sexual relationship in season 2. Being his father's son, it doesn't take him long before he nurses his broken heart after his split from Elena by jumping into bed with Pamela, "figuratively and literally." John Ross and Pamela are "cut from the same cloth" and had similar experiences with their fathers. Gonzalo described the pairing as a "dynamic duo." Executive producer Cynthia Cidre said that the romance emerges from "convenience" and common enemies. However, as a couple, they have "ups and downs" because neither one is willing to allow themselves to get hurt. Despite both still having obvious feelings for their respective exes, "People heal," Cidre stated. "They don't carry the torch forever" Cidre continued. John Ross knows that their partnership is the furthest thing from people's minds and he believes Pamela is just vulnerable enough for him to take advantage of. John Ross is not surprised when his alliance with Pamela becomes sexual because they understand one another; "they're both kind of the same person" when they want to prove themselves to their fathers. What made the pairing of John Ross and Pamela so interesting is the reveal about Pamela being Cliff's daughter. It raises the stakes because of their fathers' history, and they know they are not supposed to be together. Despite the bad blood between their fathers, John Ross and Pamela want something, and are willing to assist one another in getting it. According to Henderson, the relationship is an element of their rebellion against their fathers, and others who believe it too far fetched for them to team up. Henderson compared the pairing to Romeo and Juliet as they know if the truth about their romance ever comes out, it would cause trouble. In the episode, "A Call to Arms", Pamela finally allows herself to trust John Ross after she discovers her father was behind the explosion that killed her unborn twins; a fact that John Ross warned her about, but she initially refused to believe. The following episode, "Love & Family" saw the couple's spontaneous Las Vegas wedding giving John Ross ownership of Pamela's shares of Barnes Global. Gonzalo initially thought it was too soon, but realized the "brilliance" of the dynamic it would create between the newly weds and their respective exes.

== Storylines ==
=== Original series ===
John Ross Ewing III is the long-awaited son of J.R. (Larry Hagman) and Sue Ellen Ewing (Linda Gray). He was written into the original series at the end of season 2. During her pregnancy, Sue Ellen drinks heavily, forcing J.R. to have her committed to sanitarium. However, she escapes only to get into a drunken car accident and John Ross has to be delivered prematurely via caesarean. John Ross is officially named by his grandfather Jock (Jim Davis).

The infant is then kidnapped by the grieving mother Priscilla Duncan, but is eventually returned. By the time John Ross comes home, Sue Ellen is suffering from postpartum depression and has no interest in her son. His aunt Pam (Victoria Principal) becomes a surrogate mother to him. J.R. also shows very little interest in the child, believing John Ross is actually Cliff Barnes's (Ken Kercheval) son, due to his and Sue Ellen's affair. Cliff attempts to sue for paternal rights, but DNA test later proves J.R. is in fact his father. J.R. then enthusiastically connects with his son, whom he hopes will follow in his footsteps and run Ewing Oil. When Sue Ellen later rekindles her romance with Dusty Farlow (Jared Martin), John Ross goes to live with them at the Southern Cross Ranch in San Angelo, much to J.R.'s dismay. But when J.R. starts causing trouble for the Farlows, Sue Ellen ends the relationship and divorces J.R. She retains full custody, with J.R. seeing John Ross every other weekend.

John Ross moves back to Southfork when J.R. and Sue Ellen remarry in late 1982. After narrowly escaping a fire, John Ross becomes withdrawn, and Sue Ellen takes him to child psychologist Dr. Suzanne Lacey (Diana Douglas) against J.R.'s wishes. Dr. Lacey recommends that John Ross attend a day camp with counselors. John Ross bonds with one of the counselors, Peter Richards (Christopher Atkins) whom also has an affair with Sue Ellen. John Ross is devastated when J.R. blackmails him into leaving town. When his parents split again, J.R. sends him off the boarding school to spite Sue Ellen. J.R. agrees to give Sue Ellen custody only if John Ross can choose where he lives; and he chooses to live at Southfork. When John Ross returns from England with Sue Ellen, he is jealous of his newly discovered older half-brother, James Beaumont (Sasha Mitchell). John Ross begins taking his anger out on his cousin Christopher (Joshua Harris) and his new stepmother, Cally (Cathy Podewell). However, John Ross and Cally eventually bond. In 1991, John Ross moves to London with Sue Ellen and his new stepfather, Don Lockwood (Ian McShane).

=== Revival series ===
John Ross seems to have become a carbon copy of his father. He is driven by ambition, greed, and a strong need to prove himself. John Ross is romancing his business partner and childhood friend, Elena Ramos. Both John Ross and Christopher have been in love with Elena, but she originally chose to be with Christopher and the two almost married. John Ross clashes with his uncle Bobby (Patrick Duffy) when he drills on Southfork, going against the wishes of his late grandmother, Miss Ellie (Barbara Bel Geddes). A rivalry between John Ross and Christopher ensues as John Ross wants to drill oil, while Christopher believes renewable energy, methane, is the way of the future. John Ross schemes with J.R. to stop Bobby from selling Southfork. He attempts to nullify Miss Ellie's will on the basis of her diminished mental capacity after Jock's death. J.R. manages to gain the deed to Southfork through a deal with a Venezuelan cartel led by Vicente Cano.

After spending time in jail and nearly dying as a result of being beaten up by fellow inmates on Cano's orders for having failed to deliver the terms of their deal, John Ross decides to turn over a new leaf. He and Christopher agree to start a new company called Ewing Energies, combining oil and methane. He convinces J.R. to give Bobby back the deed to Southfork. John Ross proposes to Elena and she accepts. The family's new found peace is short-lived. Elena discovers his manipulations, dumps him, and reunites with Christopher. A heartbroken John Ross swears revenge on them, despite their new partnership. He promises to steal the company out from under them and brings J.R. on as a partner.

Being outnumbered on the Ewing Energies board, John Ross gets Elena's troublesome brother and business partner Drew (Kuno Becker) arrested for unknowingly smuggling stolen goods, allowing Sue Ellen to claim her shares. John Ross begins a romance and a business deal with Christopher's ex-wife and Cliff Barnes' daughter Pamela. It ends due to their fathers' disapproval and Pamela's decision to keep the shares of Ewing Energies she received upon her divorce, instead of turning them over to him. John Ross attempted to disprove Christopher's methane patent, but his sabotage backfires. J.R. calls him, telling him that he has a plan which he claims will be his "masterpiece", but doesn't tell him what it is. Just after J.R. tells his son he's proud of him, he is shot and killed.

John Ross is devastated by his father's death and vows revenge against the person responsible. He resorts to drugs, alcohol and sex with Bobby's stepdaughter, Emma (Emma Bell) to cope. On the day J.R. is buried, Bum shows up with a package, explaining that J.R.'s "masterpiece" was to take down the Ewings' enemies Cliff Barnes (Ken Kercheval) and Harris Ryland (Mitch Pileggi). J.R. correctly suspected that Barnes and Ryland would join forces to destroy the Ewing family.

At J.R.'s will reading, John Ross receives half of J.R.'s mineral rights, with the other half going to Sue Ellen. A letter is read from Miss Ellie revealing that she has left half of Southfork to John Ross upon J.R.'s death. Bobby is not happy with this development, but accepts it since the Ewing family needed to stand together against Ryland and Barnes. After an explosion on Christopher's methane rig causes Pamela to suffer a miscarriage of her twin babies, John Ross comforts her, but is reluctant to tell her that Cliff is behind the explosion that killed her babies. The family then learns that Cliff and Ryland are working with the governor to devalue Ewing Energies.

The Ewings rally back with some scheming of their own. John Ross marries Pamela, who had managed to become a partner in Barnes Global and gain a third of its shares. Emma finds the evidence of Harris' drug dealing with a Mexican drug cartel that leads to his arrest. After Christopher learns that his mother is dead, he gains her 1/3 ownership of Barnes Global, effectively making Cliff a minority owner in his own company. Cliff is falsely convicted of J.R.'s murder. John Ross and Christopher then learn from a letter that J.R. was dying from terminal cancer, and J.R. orchestrated his own murder to put an end to the Barnes-Ewing feud for good. Bum reveals that he killed J.R. by his request, stating that J.R.'s last act was out of love for his family. John Ross shakes Bum's hand, letting him know he understands. The season ends with John Ross celebrating his 50% ownership of Southfork, as well as continuing his affair with Emma despite his new marriage to Pamela.

He faces the consequences for his actions in season 3 when Pamela finds out about his affair with Emma. The Ewings lose control of Ewing Global when an IPO results in a shady deal with Nicolas Trevino and his benefactor the Mendez-Ochoa drug cartel results in the cartel wins control of Ewing Global. Ann and Emma are kidnapped by the cartel and John Ross rescues Emma and the mysterious cartel leader and his henchmen are arrested. Bobby and Sue Ellen buy back control of Ewing Global outmaneuvering Pamela and John Ross' attempt to take control themselves. John Ross ends up victorious when he aligns with Judith Ryland, who replaces Bobby as the new Texas Railroad Commissioner, meaning John Ross can complete his Arctic leases deal. He tells Sue Ellen and Bobby this before proclaiming that he is not just like his father - he's worse.

In his final scene (the final scene of the series) he asks Bum to find his sister who he had only just found out about earlier in the episode from a secret file from Emma. This is obviously quite important with Bum saying that J.R. is still "saving his ass from the grave". John Ross then hangs up, pours himself a glass of J.R.'s trademark bourbon, before smiling with the scene cutting to black and J.R.'s laugh echoing in the background to end the series.

== Reception ==
"As swaggering, cocksure, cowboy oilman John Ross Ewing, Josh Henderson has been proving he's more than worthy of his Ewing license plate, not to mention his magnum-size belt buckle."

— Susan Hornik on Henderson's portrayal.

TV Source Magazine's Omar Nobles approved of Henderson's casting and referred to Henderson as a "fine young actor." Jamey Giddens called Henderson the "breakout star" of the series. Dani Lyman said Henderson fills the role "brilliantly." Lisa Steinberg referred to Henderson's portrayal of John Ross as "smoldering." Omar Nobles praised Henderson's performance in the season 2 premiere and said that Henderson had settled into the character really well, and appeared very confident. The Huffington Post listed Henderson on their list of the Hottest Actors for the summer 2012 television season. In his review of the series premiere of the continuation, Ken Tucker said, "So far [Josh] Henderson displays the best chemistry with [Larry] Hagman; as son and father, they seem to enjoy scamming others (and perhaps each other?)." The actor was praised for his emotional performance in the season 2 finale in which John Ross learned the truth about his father's death. Henderson's onscreen pairing with Julie Gonzalo's was immediately praised. Omar Nobles listed John Ross and Pamela Rebecca's alliance during the season 2 premiere as one of the best moments of the episode. "John Ross and Pamela are sex on a stick" said Nobles of the potential pairing during the season 2 premiere. "[They] certainly disprove the theory that opposites attract" said Christine Orlando of TV Fanatic. Orlando commented that while the characters are kindred spirits, and make a "hot couple," the fact that they had actually grown to care about one another just made the pairing stronger. Cindy Elavsky of Tulsa World referred to the couple as a "force to be reckoned with." Entertainment Weekly said the couple's wedding was a "shock," even for Dallas fans who'd become accustomed to the show's surprising plot twist in each episode. Jackie K. Cooper of The Huffington Post described John Ross and Christopher's dynamic as a "hate fest that brings back memories of the J.R. and Bobby feuds."
