= Cherry Crush =

- Directed by: Nicholas DiBella
- Written by: Nicholas DiBella; Paul Root
- Produced by: Gary A. Knaak
- Starring: Nikki Reed; Jonathan Tucker; Julie Gonzalo; Michael O'Keefe; Haviland Morris; Dennis Boutsikaris; Frank Whaley
- Cinematography: Tim Wainwright
- Edited by: Dave Marshall; Tom Mignemi
- Music by: Joe Kaltenbach
- Release date: February 16, 2007
- Running time: 89 minutes
- Country: United States
- Language: English

Cherry Crush is a 2007 American drama thriller film directed and co-written by Nicholas DiBella. It premiered in Rochester, New York on February 16, 2007 and was released on DVD on July 3, 2007.

The film stars Jonathan Tucker as Jordan Wells, the privileged son of a successful man who gets kicked out of an exclusive prep school after his interest in photography and girls leads him to take nude snapshots of classmates. Soon he meets a poor but attractive girl named Shay Bettencourt (Nikki Reed) who ensnares him in a web of murder and lies.

== Plot ==
Photographer Jordan Wells (Jonathan Tucker) is the son of a very wealthy family which have high expectations for him to take over his father's company. Instead, he has an infatuation with the natural beauty of a woman's naked body and engages in it by taking photos of nude models but excluding their faces for the sake of privacy, with their names known as the name of their favorite shade of lipstick.

Unfortunately, the dean of his prep school finds out about his hobby and expels him. He is then transferred to a local public high school, where he then meets Shay Bettencourt, (Nikki Reed) a cellist aspiring to go to Hartley to become a cello player in a professional orchestra. When they first meet at the school library, they get into a heated intellectual argument about women's rights concerning a book. Shay's friends are uninterested and urge her to leave, but she becomes attracted to Jordan. She mentions she knows about his past, his reasons for transferring schools, and his photography hobby. They become friends and he offers to give her a ride home but when he returns to the house to visit Shay, he finds out that she does not live there at all. Jordan confronts Shay who admits to being ashamed of her low-income household which she shares with her drug-addicted sister. Shay confides in Jordan that she has found a source of money for tuition at Hartley: an older married man named Wade Chandling (Frank Whaley) who frequents the country club Jordan's family attends. She says he is going to get her a full scholarship by using some of his connections. Shay asks Jordan to photograph her and Wade in case he ever tries to back out of their deal. In exchange, Shay will allow Jordan to photograph her in any way he wants. Shay and Jordan form a sort of romantic relationship which is cut short when Shay finds out Wade is trying to back out of their arrangement.

Frustrated, Shay meets Wade in the woods and tries to blackmail him with the pictures Jordan took. However, Wade becomes angry and tries to attack Shay. Jordan tries to save Shay, but they both end up beating Wade to death. They then throw him into a nearby lake, attempt to cover up as much evidence as they can, and find ways to avoid implicating themselves when interviewed by detectives. Eventually, Detective Griffin (Michael O'Keefe) figures out Shay's connection to Wade's death and tries to set up an exchange with evidence on Jordan for the money Shay stole from the dead Wade. He tries to arrest Jordan during the exchange, but Shay shoots Griffin instead. When Jordan is questioned by the police, Desiree (Julie Gonzalo), another romantic interest of Jordan, saves him by giving him an alibi. Shay tries to take the money and run away to where she'd never be found. She tries to convince Jordan to go along with her plan, but he refuses and allows Shay to have some of the money to get away. The film ends with Jordan driving away, narrating, "With a million dollars to decide what to do next."

== Cast ==
- Nikki Reed – Shay Bettencourt
- Jonathan Tucker – Jordan Wells
- Julie Gonzalo – Desiree Thomas
- Michael O'Keefe – Detective Griffin
- Haviland Morris – Julia Wells
- Dennis Boutsikaris – Ben Wells
- Frank Whaley – Wade Chandling

== Development ==
Filming for Cherry Crush took place from August 8 to September 9, 2005, in Rochester, New York on a budget of almost a million dollars. Actors Julie Gonzalo and Frank Whaley were confirmed as part of the movie's cast, as was Michael O'Keefe.

== Themes ==
Per Samantha Lindop, the character of Shay Bettencourt is an example of a fatale character who is willing to go to any length to escape their background of poverty and obtain wealth and power.

== Release ==
Cherry Crush premiered in Rochester, New York on February 16, 2007. It was released to home video shortly thereafter and made $2.7 million in rentals within its first two weeks of release.

== Reception ==
Brendan Wills of Exclaim! panned the film, writing "Save yourself a few hours and toss Cherry Crush in the trash compactor." Jack Garner of the Democrat and Chronicle was more favorable, writing that "Tucker makes a plausibly flawed protagonist, and Reed is as seductive and manipulative as you could want."
