= Julie Gonzalo =

Argentine-American actress (born 1981)

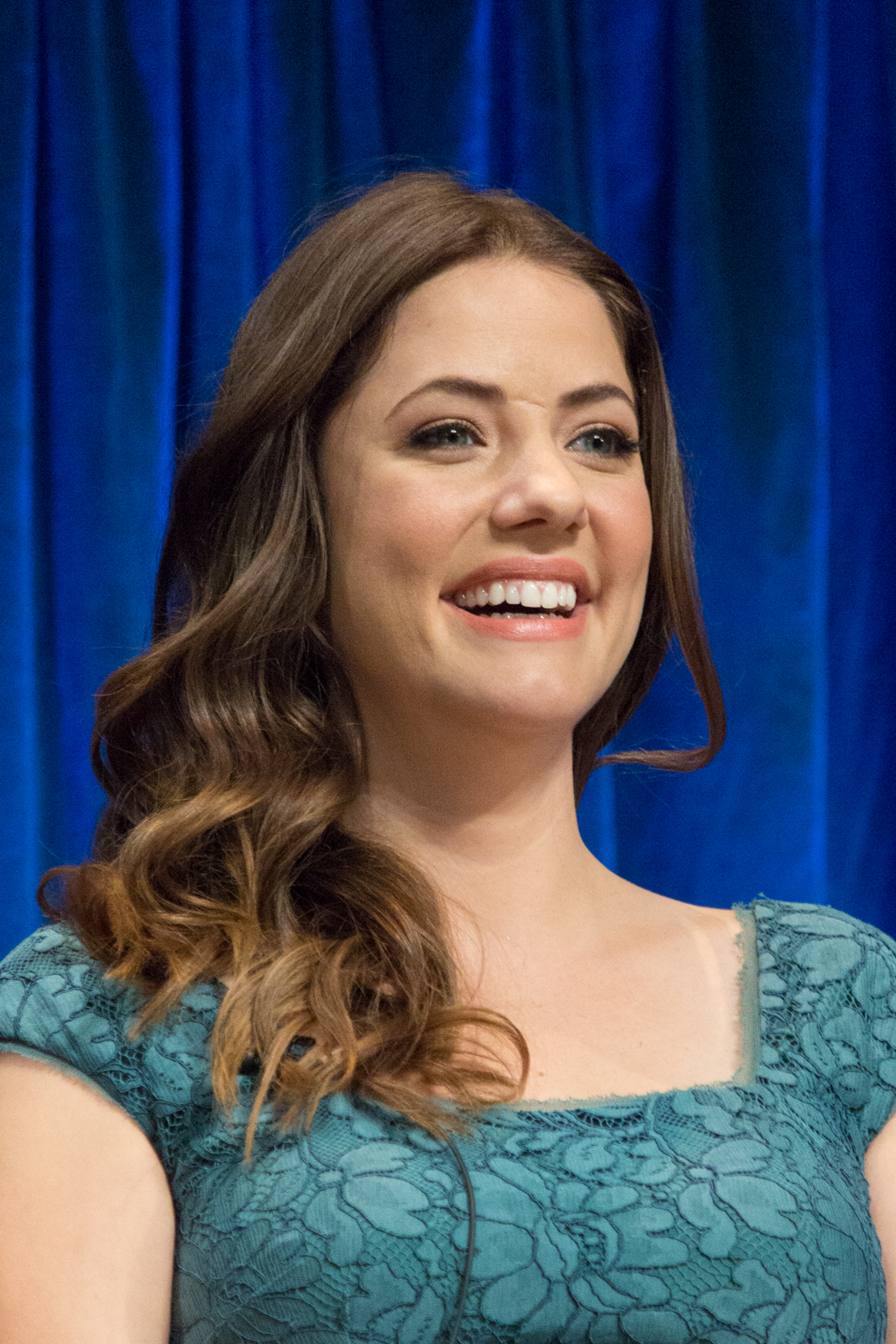
- Gonzalo in 2013
- Born: Julieta Susana Gonzalo Martyniuk; September 9, 1981 (age 45); Lanús, Buenos Aires, Argentina
- Citizenship: Argentina; United States (since 2011)
- Occupation: Actress
- Years active: 2001–present
- Spouse: Chris McNally (m. 2018)
- Children: 2

Julieta Susana Gonzalo Martyniuk (Spanish pronunciation: [ˈxuli ɣonˈsalo]; born September 9, 1981), known professionally as Julie Gonzalo, is an Argentine-American actress and model. She is known for her villainous roles in the films Freaky Friday (2003) and A Cinderella Story (2004), and has also appeared in Dodgeball: A True Underdog Story (2004) and Christmas with the Kranks (2004), as a member of the titular family.

Gonzalo's television roles have included Parker Lee in Veronica Mars (2006–2007; 2019), Maggie Dekker in Eli Stone (2008–2009), Pamela Rebecca Barnes in the soap opera Dallas (2012–2014), and Andrea Rojas in Supergirl (2019–2021). Since 2016, she has become a regular in made-for-TV movies on the Hallmark Channel.

== Early life ==
Julieta Susana Gonzalo Martyniuk was born in Buenos Aires, Argentina. She grew up in General San Martín Partido before her family emigrated to Miami Beach, Florida when she was 8 years old. She began her career as a model, and later became interested in acting, taking theater classes. Gonzalo moved to Los Angeles and made her feature film debut in the 2002 romantic comedy I'm with Lucy, opposite Monica Potter.

== Career ==
Gonzalo made her television debut on The WB comedy series Greetings from Tucson. In early 2003, she had the leading role in a WB comedy pilot called Exit 9, but the show was not picked up. The same year, she appeared on NCIS. In 2004, Gonzalo starred opposite Tori Spelling in another pilot, Me, Me, Me for UPN, which was also not picked up. She also guest-starred in the pilot episode of Drake & Josh on Nickelodeon in 2004.

Gonzalo appeared in several films in her early career. In 2003, she played Lindsay Lohan's character's rival in Freaky Friday. She played a similar role the following year in the romantic comedy A Cinderella Story, opposite Hilary Duff and Chad Michael Murray. Also in 2004, she played Justin Long's love interest in DodgeBall: A True Underdog Story and co-starred in Christmas with the Kranks as the daughter of Tim Allen and Jamie Lee Curtis' characters. In 2005, she had a supporting role in the romantic comedy Must Love Dogs. Her other credits including the 2007 thriller Cherry Crush and the lead role in the 2013 comedy horror movie Vamp U.

In 2006, Gonzalo was cast as Parker Lee, a series regular on The CW's Veronica Mars. Following that series' cancelation in 2007, she was cast as one of the leads in an ABC comedy pilot, The News. The following year, Gonzalo began starring as Maggie Dekker in the ABC legal comedy-drama Eli Stone, opposite Jonny Lee Miller. In 2008 she won the ALMA Award for Outstanding Supporting Actress in a Drama Series for her work in Eli Stone. The series was cancelled in 2009 after two seasons.

Gonzalo was cast as the lead in NBC's unaired science fiction series Day One in 2009. While originally intended to air as a 13-episode midseason show in 2009–2010, the project became a four-episode miniseries but by May 2010, it was reported that the show would likely never air. She later guest-starred on the series Castle, Nikita, The Glades and CSI: Miami.

In 2011, Gonzalo was cast as a series regular in the TNT revival series Dallas, which premiered on June 13, 2012. Her character, Rebecca Sutter, was later revealed to be Pamela Rebecca Barnes, the daughter of Cliff Barnes (Ken Kercheval) and Afton Cooper (Audrey Landers) from the original series. The new series ran for three seasons until it was canceled in 2014. Gonzalo next starred in a number of Hallmark Channel television movies, and guest starred on Grey's Anatomy and Lucifer.

In 2019, Gonzalo was cast as Andrea Rojas/Acrata, a series regular in the fifth season of Supergirl.

== Personal life ==
Gonzalo announced on a 2013 appearance on The Late Late Show with Craig Ferguson that she had become an American citizen in 2011.

In 2017, she met fellow Hallmark Channel actor Chris McNally when they worked together on the TV movie The Sweetest Heart. They married in 2018, and had their first child in June 2022. In December 2025, the couple announced that they were expecting their second child. In June 24, 2026, Gonzalo gave birth to their second child.

== Filmography ==
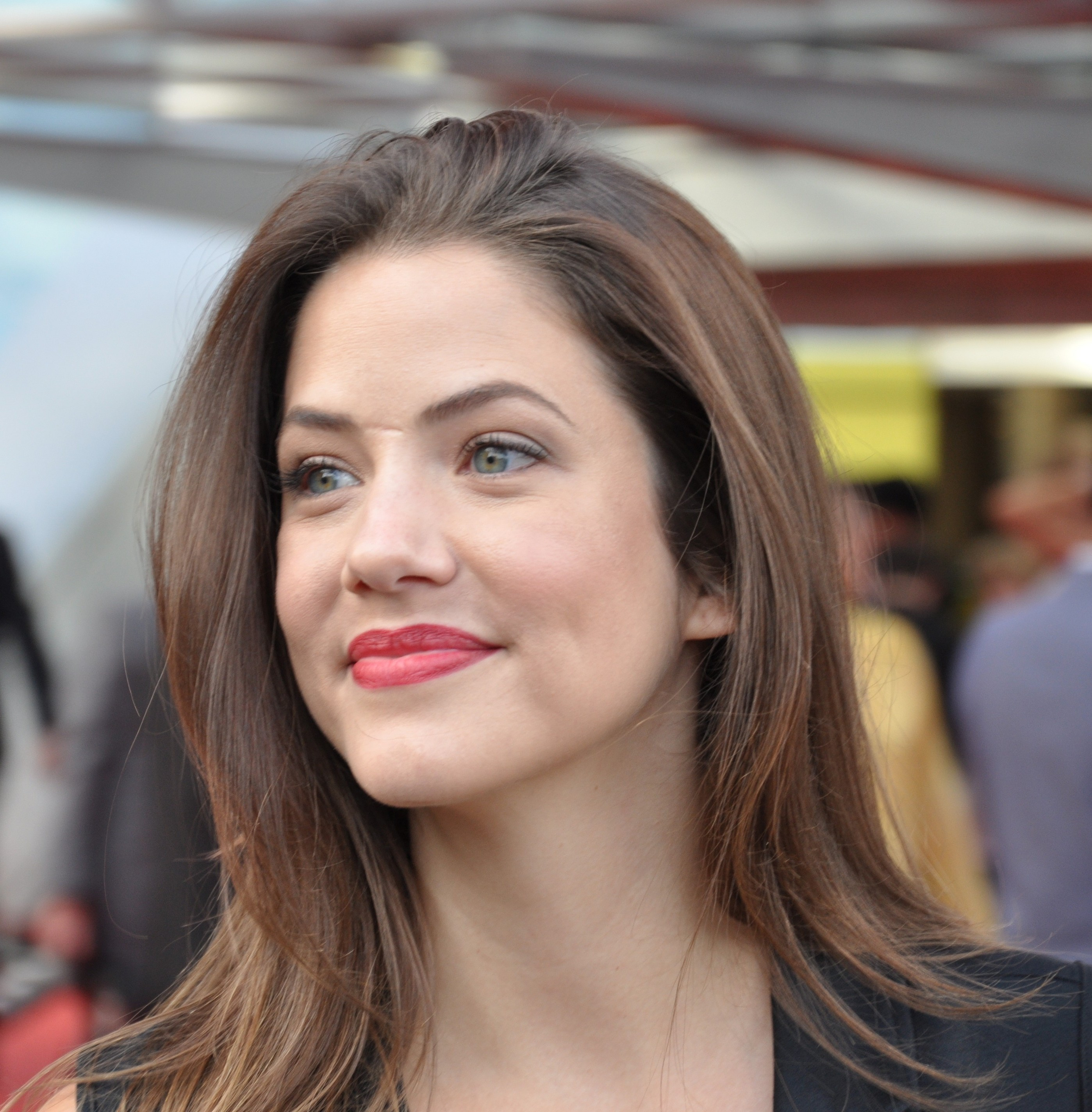
Gonzalo at the 2013 Monte-Carlo Television Festival

=== Film ===
Year	Title	Role	Notes
2001	The Penny Game	Cherry Moss	Short film
2002	I'm with Lucy	Eve	
2003	Special	Vicki	Short film
2003	Freaky Friday	Stacey Hinkhouse	
2003	Great Family	Erin Adams	
2004	Dodgeball: A True Underdog Story	Amber	
2004	A Cinderella Story	Shelby Cummings	
2004	Christmas with the Kranks	Blair Krank	
2005	Must Love Dogs	June	
2007	Silent Night	Lucy	Short film, also producer
2007	Cherry Crush	Desiree Thomas	
2007	To Rob a Thief	Gloria	
2007	Saving Angelo	Receptionist	Short film
2011	3 Holiday Tails	Lisa	Direct-to-video
2013	Vamp U	Chris Keller/Mary Lipinsky	
2014	The List	Lara	
2015	Waffle Street	Becky Adams	
2015	I Did Not Forget You	Claire	Short film
2016	Another Time	Audrey Lang	Short film
2018	How to Pick Your Second Husband First	Jillian James	
2019	A Dark Foe	Theresa	

=== Television ===
Year	Title	Role	Notes
2002–2003	Greetings from Tucson	Kim Modica	2 episodes
2003	Exit 9	Brooke	TV pilot
2003	NCIS	Sarah Schaefer	Episode: "Hung Out to Dry"
2004	Drake & Josh	Tiffany Margolis	Episode: "Pilot"
2004	Me, me, me	Pearl	TV pilot
2006–2007, 2019	Veronica Mars	Parker Lee	Main cast (Season 3); Guest (Season 4, episode "Years, Continents, Bloodshed")
2007	The News	Gretchen Holt	TV pilot
2008–2009	Eli Stone	Maggie Dekker	Main cast ALMA Award for Outstanding Supporting Actress in a Drama Series (2008); Nominated – ALMA Award for Outstanding Actress in a Drama Series (2009)
2009	Mañana es para siempre	Samantha	3 episodes
2009	Day One	Kelly	Unaired pilot
2010	Castle	Madison Queller	Episode: "Food to Die For"
2010	Nikita	Jill Morelli	Episode: "Kill Jill"
2010	The Glades	Kim Nichols	Episode: "Breaking 80"
2011	CSI: Miami	Abby Lexington	Episode: "Match Made in Hell"
2012–2014	Dallas	Pamela Rebecca Barnes	Main cast Nominated – ALMA Award for Favorite TV Actress in a Drama Series (2012); Nominated – Imagen Award for Best Supporting Actress in Television (2013)
2016	Pumpkin Pie Wars	Casey	TV movie
2017	Falling for Vermont	Angela Young/Elizabeth	TV movie
2018	The Sweetest Heart	Maddie	TV movie
2018	Grey's Anatomy	Theresa	Episode: "Fight for Your Mind"
2018	Lucifer	Jessica Johnson	Episode: "High School Poppycock"
2019	Flip that Romance	Jules Briggs	TV movie
2019–2021	Supergirl	Andrea Rojas / Acrata	Main cast (season 5–6); 39 episodes
2020	How to Train Your Husband	Jill	TV movie
2020	Jingle Bell Bride	Jessica	TV movie
2021	The Good Doctor	Jenna	Episode: "Measure of Intelligence"
2022	Cut, Color, Murder	Ali	TV movie
2023	3 Bed, 2 Bath, 1 Ghost	Anna Vasquez	TV movie
2024	A Novel Noel	Harper	TV movie
2024	Happy Holidays from Cherry Lane	Jessie Watson	TV movie
2025	My Argentine Heart	Abril	TV movie
