= Bobby Ewing =

Fictional character

- Dallas character
- Portrayed by: Patrick Duffy
- Duration: 1978–1991, 2012–2014
- First appearance: April 2, 1978; Digger's Daughter
- Last appearance: September 22, 2014; Brave New World
- Created by: David Jacobs
- Spin-off appearances: Knots Landing (1979–1982); Dallas: The Early Years (1986); Dallas: J.R. Returns (1996); Dallas: War of the Ewings (1998)
- Crossover appearances: Family Guy (1999)
In-universe information
- Occupation: Interim Texas Railroad Commissioner (2014); Partner in Ewing Global (2013–present); Co-Owner of Southfork Ranch (1991–present); Partner in Ewing Energies (2012–13); CEO of Petro Group Dallas (1987–1988); Texas State Senator (1981); Co-CEO of Ewing Oil (1980, 1982–1987, 1988–1990, 1996–1998); CEO of Ewing Construction (1978–1980); Executive at Ewing Oil (1978, 1980); Ewing Oil Roadman (1970s)
- Family: Ewing
- Father: Jock Ewing
- Mother: Ellie Ewing
- Stepfather: Clayton Farlow (1984–1999)
- Brothers: J.R. Ewing; Gary Ewing
- Half-brothers: Ray Krebbs
- Wife: Pamela Barnes (1978–1983, 1986–1987); April Stevens (1990); Ann Smith (2005–present)
- Sons: Lucas Krebbs
- Adoptive sons: Christopher Ewing
- Grandfathers: Leander Ewing; Aaron Southworth
- Grandmothers: Barbara Southworth
- Aunts and uncles: Jason Ewing; Garrison Southworth
- Nephews: Bobby Ewing II; James Beaumont; John Ross Ewing III unnamed nephew (J.R.'s child with Cally)
- Nieces: Lucy Ewing; Betsy Ewing; Molly Whittaker; Margaret Krebbs unnamed niece (J.R.'s daughter with an unknown woman)
- First cousins: Jack Ewing; Jamie Ewing Barnes

Robert "Bobby" James Ewing is a fictional character in the American television series Dallas and its 2012 revival. The youngest son of Jock and Miss Ellie Ewing, he was portrayed by actor Patrick Duffy (1978–1985, 1986–1991). Bobby had been killed off in the final episode of the 1984–1985 season, and Patrick Duffy left the show for a year. Bobby returned in the famous "shower scene" at the end of the following season. The subsequent "dream revelation" at the start of the next season explained Bobby's accident, his death, and all but the final scene, as a dream of Bobby's fiancée and ex-wife, Pamela Barnes Ewing (Victoria Principal).

Patrick Duffy returned to play Bobby in the films Dallas: J.R. Returns (1996) and Dallas: War of the Ewings (1998), as well as in the new Dallas series (2012–2014).

Dallas was planned to center on Bobby's Romeo and Juliet–style marriage to Pamela Barnes, who was from the rival Barnes family. According to Dallas scriptwriter and story editor Camille Marchetta, Bobby was initially going to be killed off by the end of season 1, leaving Pamela to become the central character of the series. Bobby's character was kept, but the show ended up focusing on his older brother, J.R. Ewing (Larry Hagman), as it became clear that he was the breakout character. Still, Bobby retained his central role as the show's primary hero, and the Abel to J.R.'s Cain.

== Background ==
Bobby was born February 16, 1949 (according to a shot of his passport in season 14 episode "Charade") on Southfork Ranch - but according to the season 2 episode "Kidnapped", Bobby's date of birth listed on his driver's license is 11/1/66. (Unlikely this is true since that would mean he wasn’t even a teenager when the show started.) Bobby became a successful (though reluctant) oil baron, like his father and brother, but he lacked J.R.'s ruthlessness and insisted on playing fair which resulted in his limited success. Bobby would also take part in the raising of cattle on the family ranch, Southfork. He was also a state senator in Austin for a while.

== Character ==
Bobby's most defining character trait was his altruistic desire to do the right thing. This almost always put him in the cross-hairs of his older brother J.R., who was known as a conniving and ruthless oilman. Bobby did on many occasions use ruthless tactics in failed attempts to beat J.R. Bobby was one of few people openly to take a stand against J.R. on numerous occasions (at times physically), yet the two never forgot they were brothers. In addition to the differences between their treatment of others, as well as their conflicting views on morality, another reason for J.R. and Bobby's rivalry was their father's preference for Bobby (their mother, Miss Ellie, favored second son Gary). Growing up, and even into adulthood, Jock made no secret of the fact that Bobby was his favorite son and Bobby was very dependent on Jock's support in his fights with J.R. This caused a major rivalry with J.R., who was jealous of the unearned favoritism Bobby got from Jock. Bobby was known for his short temper and emotional reactions.

== Storylines ==
=== Dallas ===
In the first episode of Dallas in 1978, Bobby Ewing brought his new wife to meet his family at Southfork Ranch. However, Bobby's family were dismayed to discover that Bobby's wife was Pamela Barnes (Victoria Principal, briefly Margaret Michaels), the daughter of Digger Barnes (Keenan Wynn, originally David Wayne) and the sister of Cliff Barnes (Ken Kercheval), both of whom were arch-enemies of the Ewing family. In 1982, Bobby and Pam adopted a boy named Christopher (Joshua Harris, originally Eric Farlow), who was the biological son of J.R.'s deceased sister-in-law, Kristin Shepard (Mary Crosby). Pam had always wanted a child but was unlikely to be able to have one of her own. Bobby's sister-in-law, Katherine Wentworth (Morgan Brittany), later had an unrequited crush on Bobby and began to become obsessed with him. Katherine broke up Bobby's marriage to Pam by writing a letter (pretending to be Pam) addressed to her lawyer. Bobby turned to childhood sweetheart Jenna Wade (Priscilla Presley; previously Morgan Fairchild and Francine Tacker) and they became engaged. Katherine ran Bobby down with her car, where he later died in hospital from his injuries. However, a year later, the storylines of the preceding season, including the accident and death of Bobby, were nothing more than a lengthy dream of Pam's. Bobby and Pam were reunited but Jenna discovered that she was pregnant with his child. Bobby was not interested in getting back with Jenna, and Jenna later gave birth to his son, Lucas Krebbs. When Pam was involved in a car crash which resulted in her suffering severe burns, she disappeared from the hospital and divorced Bobby and gave him sole custody of Christopher. Bobby became close to April Stevens (Sheree J. Wilson) and they began a relationship and eventually married. However, while on their honeymoon in Paris, April is kidnapped and later shot; she dies in Bobby's arms.

Bobby is first on the scene after hearing a gunshot from J.R. (Larry Hagman) room uttering the words "Oh my God." The camera never shows what Bobby actually saw and it was thought J.R. committed suicide, although in subsequent films it was explained J.R. shot a mirror.

=== J.R. Returns and War of the Ewings ===
In J.R. Returns, Bobby had a relationship with Julia Cunningham before taking over Ewing Oil. In the follow-up film War of the Ewings, he is no longer with Julia and the reasons are not even explained. He eventually starts a relationship with European oil heiress Jennifer Jantzen, who was a business associate of his brother J.R. and whose father's company Jantzen Oil was saved from bankruptcy by J.R. Between 1996 and 1998, Bobby is CEO of Ewing Oil. In 1998, Bobby retires from Ewing Oil and begins travelling with Jennifer Jantzen.

=== Dallas (2012) ===
By 2012, Bobby has remarried again, this time to a woman named Ann Smith, and is the owner of Southfork Ranch, according to the terms of Miss Ellie Ewing's will (in season 14 (ep. 353), Miss Ellie had deeded Southfork to Bobby while she was still alive, thereby suggesting a continuity error). Bobby has retired from the oil business, believing that alternative energy is "the future", a belief he shares with his now grown adopted-son Christopher, and is content to raise cattle on the ranch. He has decided to sell Southfork, due to his contracting a gastrointestinal stromal tumor (GIST) and resulting fears that he will not be around to keep the ranch safe, and that Christopher is not yet ready to take over from him. Once again, this brings him into conflict with his older brother J.R. and his nephew, John Ross Ewing III (who has discovered oil on the ranch). Bobby is shocked and saddened when he finds out his brother J.R. is dead. When J.R.'s will is read Bobby receives J.R.'s entire boot collection on the condition that he keeps them cleaner than he keeps his own. Also an old letter from Miss Ellie reveals that John Ross gets half of Southfork. Bobby doesn't agree but goes along with it for now, although it later leads to some disputes between Bobby and John Ross. Bobby also learns that his first wife Pam died of cancer in 1989.

== Knots Landing appearances ==
Bobby Ewing appeared in three episodes of the Dallas spin-off series, Knots Landing, between 1979 and 1982.

Season 1

- Episode 1: "Pilot". Bobby accompanies his brother Gary and sister-in-law Valene to their new home in California.

Season 2

- Episode 13: "The Loudest Word". Bobby visits Val in the hospital, where she is awaiting surgery. Bobby persuades Gary to support Val through her illness.

Season 4

- Episode 6: "New Beginnings". While Gary is at Southfork for the reading of Jock's will, Bobby reassures Gary about his upcoming inheritance and the strings that their father had tied to it.

=== Knots Landing and Bobby Ewing's death ===
As many storylines on Knots Landing depended on the actions of several characters following the death of Bobby Ewing in 1985, the subsequent dream revelation from Dallas in 1986 did not get applied to the continuity of Knots Landing. Bobby's return was never addressed or even mentioned and, following this, no further crossover storylines were featured on Knots Landing.
