= Christopher Ewing =

Fictional character in the TV series Dallas

- Dallas character
- Jesse Metcalfe as Christopher Ewing
- Portrayed by: Eric Farlow (1982–1985); Joshua Harris (1985–1991); Chris Demetral (1996); Jesse Metcalfe (2012–2014)
- Duration: 1981–1991, 1996, 2012–2014
- First appearance: December 11, 1981; Starting Over
- Last appearance: September 22, 2014; Brave New World
- Created by: David Jacobs
- Spin-off appearances: Knots Landing; Dallas: J.R. Returns
In-universe information
- Occupation: Partner in Ewing Global (2013–2014); Partner in Ewing Energies (2012–2013)
- Family: Ewing
- Father: Jeff Farraday
- Mother: Kristin Shepard
- Adoptive father: Bobby Ewing
- Adoptive mother: Pamela Barnes Ewing
- Stepmother: April Ewing (adoptive); Ann Ewing (adoptive)
- Half-brothers: Lucas Wade-Krebbs (adoptive)
- Wife: Pamela Rebecca Barnes (2012–12)
- Grandfathers: Jock Ewing (adoptive); Willard "Digger" Barnes (adoptive)
- Grandmothers: Patricia Shepard; Miss Ellie Ewing (adoptive); Rebecca Wentworth (adoptive)
- Uncles: J.R. Ewing (adoptive); Gary Ewing (adoptive); Ray Krebbs (adoptive); Cliff Barnes (adoptive)
- Aunts: Sue Ellen Shephard; Lisa Farraday aka Lisa Alden; Katherine Wentworth (adoptive)
- First cousins: John Ross Ewing III (biological and adoptive); James Beaumont (adoptive); Son of J. R. and Cally Ewing (adoptive); Daughter of J. R. Ewing and unknown woman (adoptive); Lucy Ewing (adoptive); Bobby Ewing II (adoptive); Betsy Ewing (adoptive); Molly Whittaker (adoptive); Margaret Krebbs (adoptive); Lucas Wade-Krebbs (adoptive); Pamela Rebecca Barnes (adoptive)

Christopher Ewing is a fictional character from the American prime time drama series Dallas and the continuation series. The character was written into the series in the episode "Starting Over", which first aired on December 11, 1981. The role was portrayed by Joshua Harris from 1985 until the conclusion of the original series in 1991. In the continuation series, the role is portrayed by Jesse Metcalfe. Christopher is the adopted son of Bobby and the late Pam Ewing and the biological son of Kristin Shepard (Sue Ellen Ewing's sister) and Jeff Farraday.

The continuation series opens with Christopher's wedding to Rebecca Sutter. The series also focuses on Christopher's feud with John Ross as they disagree on how to revive the family's former glory. Tension also stems from John Ross's romance with Christopher's ex-fiancée, Elena Ramos. Christopher does his best to emulate his adoptive father's noble ways and the Ewing family name. However, John Ross's underhanded tactics and constant badgering about his not being a blood Ewing leads to Christopher making questionable choices. Rebecca is revealed to be Pamela Rebecca Barnes, the daughter of Cliff Barnes, Christopher's adoptive uncle. Their relationship falls apart when Pamela's schemes are revealed. Christopher also harbors resentment for his adoptive mother who has been gone for years, believing she abandoned him.

A "breakout role" for Metcalfe, Christopher is "Ambitious, environmentally-friendly, loyal and with a whole lot of heart, Jesse's Christopher is his father's son," Access Hollywood said of the character. TV Guide likened the character to Al Gore due to his interest in green energy.

== Creation ==
=== Background ===
Kristin Shepard, Sue Ellen Ewing's younger sister, leaves Dallas after having an affair with Sue Ellen's husband, J.R. and then shooting him. The drug addict Kristin travels to Los Angeles where she becomes involved with a drug dealer named Jeff Farraday. She gives birth to Farraday's son in 1981. Due to the character being so young in the original series, Metcalfe comes up with a lot of Christopher's backstory himself. After high school, Christopher sees himself settling down to marry his childhood sweetheart, Elena Ramos, the Ewing maid's daughter, but that does not happen. The destruction of his relationship with Elena reminds Christopher of his feelings of abandonment, due to him being adopted, and the only mother he's ever known, abandoning him as well. Christopher runs away looking to start over, "lick his wounds," and discover who he is. Christopher comes up with a long-term goal and a way to put his stamp on the Ewing family legacy. According to Metcalfe, by the time of the 2012 series, Christopher is "completely green." Prior to the 2012 series, Christopher lives in China for two years, where he works to develop this alternative energy.

=== Casting ===
The role was originated by two unknown infant actors on the December 11, 1981 episode. The unknown child actors were replaced by Eric Farlow in 1982, when the character made an appearance on the series spin-off, Knots Landing. Farlow first appeared in the episode, "New Beginnings" which first aired on October 29, 1982. Farlow last appeared on the Dallas episode, "Swan Song" which aired on May 17, 1985. Joshua Harris then stepped into the role on September 27, 1985, in the episode "The Family Ewing." Harris last appeared in the penultimate episode "The Decline and Fall of the Ewing Empire" which aired on April 26, 1991. Chris Demetral stepped into the role of Christopher in 1996 for the television film, Dallas: J.R. Returns.

With announcement of the continuation series, the producers put out several casting calls, including one for the role of Christopher. While filming the NBC series, Chase, Metcalfe's agent contacted him urged him to audition for the continuation of Dallas. Initial rumors said Kiefer Sutherland was in the running for the role of John Ross or Christopher. However, the rumor was quickly proven to be false. Metcalfe had some reservations about taking the role on the remake of such an iconic show, fearing it might not succeed. Metcalfe admitted that his hesitation also stemmed from his belief that the series was just "another prime-time soap opera to me, it wasn't somewhere I wanted to go." Metcalfe originally auditioned for the role of John Ross, which was instead awarded to Josh Henderson. On February 8, 2011, Nellie Andreeva reported that the series had narrowed the search for Christopher down to two actors, one of which was Metcalfe; Metcalfe was known for his portrayal of John Rowland on Desperate Housewives. Alex Russell, best known for his starring role in the 2012 film Chronicle was also considered for the role. Metcalfe's casting was confirmed two days later. It was not until he learned that original cast members Larry Hagman, Patrick Duffy, and Linda Gray had signed on to play the characters of J.R., Bobby and Sue Ellen, that Metcalfe gladly accepted the role of Christopher.

=== Characterization ===
"I approach the character with a sense of great abandonment. Christopher is trying to find his place in the Ewing family hierarchy, and live up to his father--which is a tall order, because Bobby is so well respected. He really wants to make his father proud and prove to his father that he has the same strength of character and that he can be at the head of the table and run Southfork in his absence."

— Metcalfe on his portrayal of Christopher.

As a child, Christopher is a charming, and gentle-hearted young boy with an extended and confusing family. "...[D]espite his tangled start in life, he grew up with the Ewing name." For Christopher, it is always "family first," much like his adoptive father Bobby Ewing. He also possesses a strong sense of morality. He wants to protect his family, and make his family, and his adoptive father proud. Because he is written as a "the hero," of the series, Christopher is always very conflicted. "It's not easy to make the virtuous choice," said Metcalfe. Though Christopher has grown up trying to emulate his adoptive father, "his ambitions are pushing him to succeed, sometimes my any means necessary." Metcalfe said, "Christopher is a chip off the old block," referencing the character's similarities to Bobby. Christopher has a strong sense of ethic. But unlike Bobby, Christopher has personal issues that make him much more "volatile," and a bit hot headed. Metcalfe agreed with Curt Wagner's observation of Christopher as wanting to live up the standard set by Bobby, but being more of a realist, and knowing that good guys usually finish last. Christopher spends a lot of time on the verge of abandoning his upstanding tactics. Christopher is also very "brainy" and "intelligent" Metcalfe revealed to CraveOnline. Of his alter ego, in addition to maintaining his smarts, Metcalfe said Christopher should be "a step ahead. I think in the past that was possibly the problem with Bobby; is that he always seemed to be a step behind. I want Christopher to have learned from his father's mistakes. I want Christopher to have learned from history there and to maybe be a smarter version of his father, and also one there's a little more grey area with Christopher." Christopher is not completely defined by his morality, but at "his core he's a very moral and ethical guy," said Metcalfe. However, Christopher is willing to play dirty if it will help his family.

== Storylines ==
=== Original series ===
Christopher is born to Kristin Shepard and Jeff Farraday in Los Angeles, California. Kristin returns to Dallas claiming Christopher is J.R.'s son and tries to extort money from him. She also blackmails Dallas oilman Jordan Lee for money claiming Christopher is his son. When Kristin drowns in the Southfork pool, Jeff Farraday contacts Bobby Ewing, who secretly purchases Christopher for $25,000. Bobby's wife, Pamela, is thrilled they finally have a child to adopt. Jeff later returns with additional documentation for Bobby concerning Kristin and Christopher. J.R. discovers that Christopher is Kristin's child and believes that he is the father and blackmails Bobby with this information. After Bobby finds Jeff murdered, he and Pam travel to California to investigate the details of Kristin's life before returning to Dallas. It is determined that the documents provided by Jeff to Bobby prove that Kristin miscarried J.R.'s baby. She then married Jeff, who fathered a prematurely-born Christopher. In 1983, Pamela's mother Rebecca dies, leaving a large trust fund for Christopher. His parents divorce that year and during that time, Christopher lives with Pamela. Christopher is overjoyed when his parents remarry in 1986 and move back to Southfork Ranch, where he is reunited with his cousin, John Ross. In 1987, Christopher and John Ross have a mock gunfight, and Sue Ellen sends them to play outside. Unable to find a toy gun, Christopher takes Bobby's revolver and after some "hide and seek", he takes a shot at John Ross; he misses, only shattering a screen door.

Christopher with his adoptive mother Pam in 1983.

In May 1987, Christopher is devastated when he accidentally overhears a conversation between Miss Ellie and Clayton about him being adopted. His parents comfort him and explain their reasons for not initially telling him the truth. Christopher's life is turned upside down when Pamela has a bad car accident; when Bobby keeps him away from the hospital, the boy believes it is because he is adopted. Soon after, Pamela disappears from the hospital, leaving a note for Bobby that claims she doesn't want anyone to see how badly burned she actually is. Christopher is bitter and angry when Pamela requests a divorce; later, he's forced into the middle of a custody battle between Bobby and Lisa Alden, Jeff Farraday's sister. Lisa drops the case after hearing Christopher tell the judge he doesn't want to be away from his father.

In 1989, Christopher and John Ross discuss J.R.'s new wife, Cally, and conclude that they've done all right despite not having their mothers around; they also agree that all women cause trouble. However, both boys bond with Cally, and Christopher is a bit jealous of the attention she gives John Ross. Accompanied by Bobby and his girlfriend, April Stevens, Christopher goes on his first date that fall. When John Ross gets a motorcycle as a gift from his new-found half-brother, James, Christopher is left alone. John Ross teases his cousin about being the baby of the family, and they have a fight. Christopher takes out his anger by throwing darts at a picture of John Ross. In 1990, Bobby and April marry, and Christopher approves. However, his happiness is short-lived: April is killed on the honeymoon. In 1991, John Ross is sent to live with his mother in London. Missing his cousin greatly, Christopher visits him in London in May 1991.

=== 2012 (TV series) ===
In the 2012 continuation of the television series, a grown-up Christopher (now portrayed by Jesse Metcalfe) takes after Bobby and concerns himself with the welfare of the land and environment. However, John Ross is more like JR, pitting the two against each other. Christopher is looking into alternative energy sources such as methane ice, which could cause some problems since the family has been in the oil business for decades. Christopher resents John Ross because he feels that his cousin has exploited the Ewing name to get anything he wants, while John Ross has continually criticized him for not being a biological Ewing. He was married to John Ross's wife Pamela (who was originally posing as a woman named Rebecca Sutter, who turned out to be Cliff Barnes' daughter, making Pamela Christopher's adopted cousin; Cliff was the first Pamela Barnes Ewing's brother) who miscarried their twin children. He was once re-engaged to Elena, but he broke up with her over her deception involving her brother Drew and the sabotage of his methane rig. Later he takes a romantic interest in a Southfork ranch hand named Heather (AnnaLynne McCord).

It is mentioned that he attended Stanford University prior to the events of the revival series. In the final episode of the series in 2014, a man who appeared to be Christopher (but only seen from the back) was seen getting into a car that then exploded moments later. It is possible that a car bomb was planted on the orders of Elena's lover Nicolas Treviño, but the cliffhanger was never resolved.

== Reception ==
Brenda Strong, who played Christopher's stepmother, Ann Ewing, praised the actor's performance in the filming of the pilot, noting how much he had improved since his role on Desperate Housewives. Access Hollywood said Metcalfe's performance in the pilot was the actor's best work to date.
