= Pam Ewing =

Fictional character in CBS' Dallas

Pamela Barnes Ewing
- Dallas character
- Victoria Principal as Pamela Ewing
- Portrayed by: Victoria Principal (1978–1987); Margaret Michaels (1988)
- Duration: 1978–1988
- First appearance: April 2, 1978; Digger's Daughter
- Last appearance: October 28, 1988; Carousel
- Created by: David Jacobs
- Spin-off appearances: Dallas: The Early Years
- Crossover appearances: Family Guy (1999)
In-universe information
- Other names: Pamela Jean Barnes
- Occupation: Businesswoman; Retailer worker
- Family: Barnes (by birth); Ewing (by marriage)
- Father: Willard "Digger" Barnes (legal); Hutch McKinney (biological)
- Mother: Rebecca Barnes Wentworth
- Brothers: Tyler Barnes (legal brother, biological half-brother); Cliff Barnes (legal brother, biological half-brother)
- Sisters: Catherine Barnes (legal sister, biological half-sister)
- Half-sisters: Katherine Wentworth
- Husband: Ed Haynes (1968; annulled); Bobby Ewing (1978–1983, 1986–1987)
- Adoptive sons: Christopher Ewing
- Grandfathers: Henry Barnes (legal)
- Aunts: Maggie Monahan (legal)
- Nieces: Pamela Rebecca Barnes
- First cousins: Jimmy Monahan (legal)

Pamela Jean "Pam" Barnes Ewing is a fictional character from the CBS primetime soap opera Dallas. Pamela is portrayed by actress Victoria Principal, first appearing on the show in the first episode, titled "Digger's Daughter", which was first broadcast on April 2, 1978. Dallas follows the trials of the wealthy Ewing family in the city of Dallas, Texas, which Pam has married into. Principal played Pam until the end of season 10 in 1987, when the character crashes her car into a truck carrying butane and propane and her body is severely burned. A year later, she was briefly played by actress Margaret Michaels in an attempt to write the character out. Pamela's storylines in season 1 focus on her relationship with her new husband, Bobby Ewing (Patrick Duffy), and her fight against the considerable suspicion and hostility from within the Ewing family, due to Pamela being a member of the Barnes family. Pamela's love for Bobby remains a strong character trait throughout her tenure on the show, noted for its similarities to Romeo and Juliet, with two people from hostile families falling in love.

In the early years of Dallas, Principal took measures to add depth to her character. She initially was very distant from the cast and they assumed she didn't like them. Series producer Leonard Katzman confronted her about the issue and she said, "I like everybody. It's just that I want to feel like an outsider, like Pam Barnes does, being married to a Ewing." Principal also took to other ways of improving her character, such as taking voice lessons to perfect a Texas accent. Her relationship with Patrick Duffy's character, Bobby, was a central component to the show, and when Duffy returned to Dallas in 1986, after being killed off a year earlier, the entire previous year had been written off as Pam's dream.

Principal received positive reviews for her portrayal of Pamela and a Golden Globe nomination in the category of "Best Actress in a Television Series" at the 40th Golden Globe Awards. She was nominated for a Soap Opera Digest award for "Outstanding Actress in a Leading Role on a Prime Time Serial" in 1986, while also sharing a nomination with Patrick Duffy for "Favorite Super Couple: Prime Time" in 1988. Hal Erickson of MSN.com opined that Pamela's exit from the series was open ended and left the audience hanging.

== Casting and creation ==
=== Background ===
Before the creation of Dallas, series creator David Jacobs had quite a different idea of what he envisioned the show to be. He wanted to create a television show based on "family issues and examining relationships at the middle class level". The Production Company, CBS, initially turned down his original idea, as they wanted something more "glitzy" to put on the air, with wealthier characters. After the success of Dallas, Jacobs' initial idea would later become the Dallas spin-off Knots Landing. He conceived Pamela as the central character of the Texas-based serial. The role was created specifically for actress Linda Evans to star, and was indefinitely called "The Untitled Linda Evans Project" that was set in Indianapolis. He described her character as, "a semitrashy lady who marries into a rich Texas family". After crafting the backstory of the Ewing family, Jacobs began to realize that the show couldn't be settled simply around the character of Pamela. He wanted it to be based around the entire clan and their lives as wealthy oil people living in Dallas, Texas. Evans was ultimately not offered the part, but ironically would later go on to play Krystle Carrington on Dynasty, a rival show to Dallas.

=== Casting ===
After Jacobs decided that Evans would no longer play Pam, he began searching for another actress to play the character. The role was eventually won by then 28-year-old actress, Victoria Principal. Principal won the role over another finalist, Judith Chapman, who was known famously for her work in daytime television. Shortly after Principal's role on Fantasy Island, a friend pointed her in the direction of Dallas and "a part in it that was written for you". Eventually, Principal received a copy of the script "and read it and thought [my friend] was absolutely right". Acting as her own agent, she set up a meeting with the producers of Dallas. Lee Rich, an executive producer in 1979, recounted: "We had all heard rumors about Victoria. This is a small town. Victoria's background, her so-called past, was a plus. We felt that she had experienced life and could understand the part." Jacobs later said, "Victoria, of all the actors, went for the role the most aggressively. And that sort of determination just became part of the character." Prior to being cast in Dallas, Principal had starred in a few small roles in movies and television specials. These works include Earthquake in 1974, and Fantasy Island in 1977.

In 1977, Aaron Spelling offered Principal a role in the pilot of his television series Fantasy Island, which she accepted, however, she stipulated in the contract for the role to be written out as she was planning to attend law school. However, she obtained the pilot audition script for Dallas and her career ambitions changed. As Principal explained to TV Guide Network in 2004, "I had left acting to be an agent and was on my way to law school, but when a friend dropped off a Dallas script, I read it. When I finished, I knew my life had changed – that part was mine. So I called the [casting] person and said, "I'm sending someone in." She said, "Who?" I said, "Just put down my name. It will be a surprise." And it certainly was a surprise – I showed up with me! I sent myself in for it!" Principal landed the role of Pamela Barnes Ewing on the long-running prime time TV soap opera series Dallas that aired on the CBS network from 1978 to 1991.

Patrick Duffy, who would play Pamela's on-screen love, knew the part was ideal for Principal the minute he set his eyes on her. He recalled that one of the finalists for Pamela "was a remarkably talented young actress from New York...[who was] really good. [Later], in walked Victoria Principal with the tightest jeans I've ever seen and the most unbelievable blouse. I just went, 'Hello, Pam'. I knew she was going to be Pam Ewing." Producer Michael Filerman (Knots Landing and Falcon Crest) offered insight, "Principal really wanted that role...and worked very hard to get it. And there's a humanity about her that's just winning. And the camera likes her very much. The camera just loves her. That's real important." During the pilot filming, Principal became very close with teenaged actress Charlene Tilton, who played Lucy Ewing. Principal explained that "the location shooting was hard on Tilton, who was only seventeen and had never been away from home".

After appearing in ten of the fourteen seasons of Dallas, Principal indicated that she wished to leave the serial to pursue other venues, and chose not to renew her contract. Leonard Katzman, who was the executive producer at the time, was now faced with the show losing one of its main characters. Initially, Principal's departure was made out to be a simple "snag in contract negotiations". Lorimar also made notice that the departure was related to a "financial disagreement", even after Principal's agent gave notice that she was leaving. A show spokesperson commented, "We were unable to reach an agreement and now the producers are revising scripts without her...she turned down our last offer." The Milwaukee Journal noted that Principal was lined up for other venues at the time, included a project serial of her own. However, Principal, saying:

"I've considered [leaving Dallas] for two years, and in the last six months, it's seemed real clear to me. I realized that my job would become my career if I stayed. Some people stay with a series until the end, you know, and afterwards they often have some problems, I think, finding new opportunities. And I wanted a career after Dallas. There's great sadness in leaving my friends and the show – I was never bored with it – but I'm not at all ambivalent about this. I'm realistic about taking care of myself financially. I didn't want to walk away blindly without plans. My plans are set. I have a project with a network that is ready to go that I can't talk about yet. It's a drama mystery."

Principal also reunited with several former cast mates in the Dallas reunion special titled Dallas Reunion: The Return to Southfork that was televised in 2004, marking her first public appearance with them since her exit from the show.

=== Potential return ===
In an interview with Digital Spy.com, Cynthia Cidre (the show's executive producer) commented: "Bobby's ex-wife – played by Victoria Principal from 1978 to 1987 – is not currently planned to appear in the revamped soap's second season. It's not in our plans so far and I've pitched the whole season. It seemed to me at the time [that the series] needed a breath of fresh air, so I said let's give Bobby a new wife, having no idea what a pot I was stirring. I personally have not reached out to [Victoria Principal] and to my knowledge the studio hasn't either, and I don't think she has any interest in it.

— Cidre on Pam's return

In 2010, TNT (sister company to Warner Bros. Television which is the current copyright owner of the series) announced it was producing a new, updated series of Dallas. The new series is a continuation of the original series, and primarily centered around J.R. Ewing's son John Ross Ewing III, and Bobby Ewing and Pam's adopted son Christopher Ewing, though various stars of the original series will be reprising their roles. With the Dallas continuation set to air in June 2012, rumors began swirling that Principal could make a return to the show as Pam. On March 28, 2012, Yahoo.com reported that Principal's return to the show was a definite possibility.

They said, "Victoria Principal could be set to make a shock return to legendary drama series Dallas after stars Patrick Duffy and Jesse Metcalfe let slip producers want her in the show's upcoming reboot. The actress' character, Pamela Ewing, was written out of the series in 1987, when viewers were told she had only months to live after fleeing the Texan dynasty." In an added piece, they said: "But the storyline was left open-ended, and it's now emerged Principal – who is the only surviving member of the show's original cast not signed up for the relaunch later this year – could be brought back to Dallas in an explosive plot." Jesse Metcalfe said, "She hasn't (come back) – she hasn't as yet. But I think for the producers of the show, it's an open invitation."

The Staff of Yahoo.com said that Principal was "the one major missing piece" of the new Dallas and made notion that a possible return could potentially happen in the future, critically saying: "The drama. The mystery. The intrigue. Specifically, where is Victoria Principal?" Entertainment Weekly said that Principal was "certainly missed" as original character Pam when reviewing the new series. Morgan Jeffrey of Digital Spy said that Principal was "unlikely" to return to the new series due to lack of interest in the project, but the door would always be open. He said, "She's indicated that it's something she's not interested in."

== Character development ==
=== Lineage and personality ===
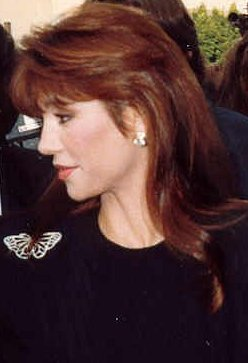
Victoria Principal noted that Pamela evolved significantly as Dallas progressed.

The character of Pamela was a cornerstone for Dallas; the lynchpin of the Barnes/Ewing family around which the soap was originally structured. At the beginning of the serial in 1978, Pamela was the newly married wife of Bobby Ewing, the youngest son of oil baron Jock Ewing and Miss Ellie Ewing. The fictional history of the character has been told via the serial, and the made-for-television movie Dallas: The Early Years, which told the backstory of the Ewing family and the Barnes family. Dallas: The Early Years told the background of the longstanding feud between Jock Ewing and Pamela's father, Willard "Digger" Barnes, and how Pamela came to be raised. Later, on Digger's deathbed, Pamela comes to find that Digger is not her biological father, but that her biological father is in fact Hutch McKinney, who had an affair with her mother Rebecca Barnes while she was married to Digger. Digger caught them together, and Digger ended up shooting Hutch dead in a temper and burying Hutch's body on Southfork land. Digger then brought up Pamela as if she were his own daughter, becoming her legal father. Pamela's mother, Rebecca, left Digger and her children behind in mysterious circumstances when Pamela was a year old, giving Digger the impression that she was dead. Pamela and Cliff were both raised by Digger and Digger's sister, their aunt Maggie.

As a member of the Barnes family, Pamela was initially met with suspicion and hostility from the rival Ewing family after she had married Bobby Ewing and moved onto the Southfork Ranch to live with her new husband. The strongest hostility towards Pamela came from Bobby's older brother, J.R. Ewing, who tried to drive Pamela off Southfork Ranch with methods of bribery and intimidation, as well as trying to con Bobby into believing that Pamela was having an affair with her ex-boyfriend, Ray Krebbs. Principal, who wanted to represent her character's outsider perception of the family, would portray this with the cast. Leonard Katzman described her as being "the world's most isolated lady". When confronted by Katzman about why Principal chose to be isolated from everyone else, he described the situation as: "After a while, I thought, 'Maybe she doesn't like us'. I went to see her. She said, 'No, I like everybody. It's just that I want to feel like an outsider, like Pam Barnes does, being married to a Ewing.'" Principal also took to other ways of improving her character, such as taking voice lessons to perfect a Texas accent. Fellow actor Patrick Duffy analyzed:

"She is enigmatic but I must tell you I never had a bad experience because of her enigma. What it was, she explained this once, is that she did this on purpose. The choice she made as an actress was, in playing the outsider in the Ewing family, she actually maintained somewhat of an outsider position with the cast as social equals. She didn't do a lot of the hanging out social activities that a lot of us did because we were together so much. So in that sense, she was maybe a few percentage points removed from the swirl that was the social center of our group. At least twice a year Larry Hagman and I would go up to Canada – fishing trips, hunting trips, things like that. Steve Kanaly was included in that group, and we would go up together, and Steve and I would take other trips together. We were a group, and Linda Gray was also a member of that group. Victoria was always slightly outside and didn't participate in those things. It was her own choice and she felt it was conducive to her playing the part of Pamela. But the times we were together on the set, waiting for scenes to be shot, in the make-up room and everything, it was nothing but convivial."

Victoria Principal has said that she feels Pam changed throughout the course of the series. She commented, "Pam didn’t have two parents, her father was a drunkard, and she really had to fight for everything she aspired to and achieved. When Bobby married her, he wasn’t marrying a milquetoast; she was very, very spirited; she was always a good person. I always felt Pam was the moral centre of the programme but she was complicated, and she was fiery, she had opinions, and she was not afraid to voice them. But as the years went by, as J.R. became more and more evil, the writers felt, and I certainly understand why for the benefit of the show, that Pam had to become more and more good." When asked about whether she had any input on her characters growth, she said: "Once the show achieved extraordinary world wide fame, I don’t think any of us had much input. You know the old saying, if it's not broken, don’t fix it; I really believe that Lorimar Television looked upon it as something that was working and they did not want to deviate from the formula."

=== Relationships ===
In a dream, Pam (Victoria Principal) clutches Bobby after he was hit by a car.

Pamela's marriage to Bobby Ewing is central to understanding her character. The couple produced the opening scene of Dallas when the show first aired in 1978, with Bobby bringing his new bride home to meet Jock and Miss Ellie Ewing. Their complex relationship has often been compared to that of Shakespeare's Romeo and Juliet. When asked about whether or not series creator David Jacobs had this parallel relationship in mind from the start, he said: "Yes, guilty (laughs)". Relations can be made from William Shakespeare's two feuding families in Romeo and Juliet, the Montagues and the Capulets. These families represent the Barnes and the Ewing feuding families, with Pamela being portrayed as Juliet Capulet and Bobby as Romeo Montague. According to Patrick Duffy, being immediately paired off with Principal was a challenge. He said, "We were in a constant state of competition. We were very territorial in front of the camera, and it was a strain." However, their off-screen relationship significantly improved in the show's third season, with Duffy explaining: "I developed an appreciation for her, and I think for the first time she started to trust me. Some of the best scenes on the show were between Victoria and me, and they happened after we got comfortable with each other."

Pamela and Bobby's relationship changed significantly as the show went on and began to progress. In order to create conflict, the producers brought in actors Priscilla Presley (Jenna Wade) and John Beck (Mark Graison) to cause drama for the couple. Eventually, the two characters divorced one another and went their separate ways. After becoming involved with Ewing Oil, Bobby tended to put Pam on the backburner with the company coming first. In an interview with People, Principal said: "I wouldn't put up with the way Pam is treated by Bobby." She also added, "Our marriage just doesn't work anymore and I want a divorce." With the impending couple doomed, Pamela began a newfound relationship with Mark Graison (played by John Beck). The producers of Dallas were faced with the obstacle of getting the audience to root for a new love interest in Pam's life. When asked about the reception of his characters relationship with Pamela, Beck commented: "It was always set up that way from the beginning, so it was quite a task and of course they came back together in the long run. I was just hoping for the best. I never got an extraordinary reaction from the public but it was everywhere, so constant recognition. It was pretty amazing but I never saw it the way he sees it but I can see his point of view. I never really looked at it like that."

In 1985, Patrick Duffy announced his intentions to leave the show which left Pamela and Bobby permanently disconnected from each other. When Duffy initially left Dallas in 1985, it was assumed that Pamela and Bobby's relationship had finally ended after a brief reconciliation during that season. However, the actor returned to the show the following season after the ratings began to fall. Leonard Katzman said, "Without Bobby we lost the white knight to J.R. and the Romeo to Victoria Principal's Juliet. With Patrick back we can return to the family drama that made the show." The entire previous season was written off as a dream, with Pamela waking up and finding Bobby alive in the shower.

== Storylines ==
=== Original run ===
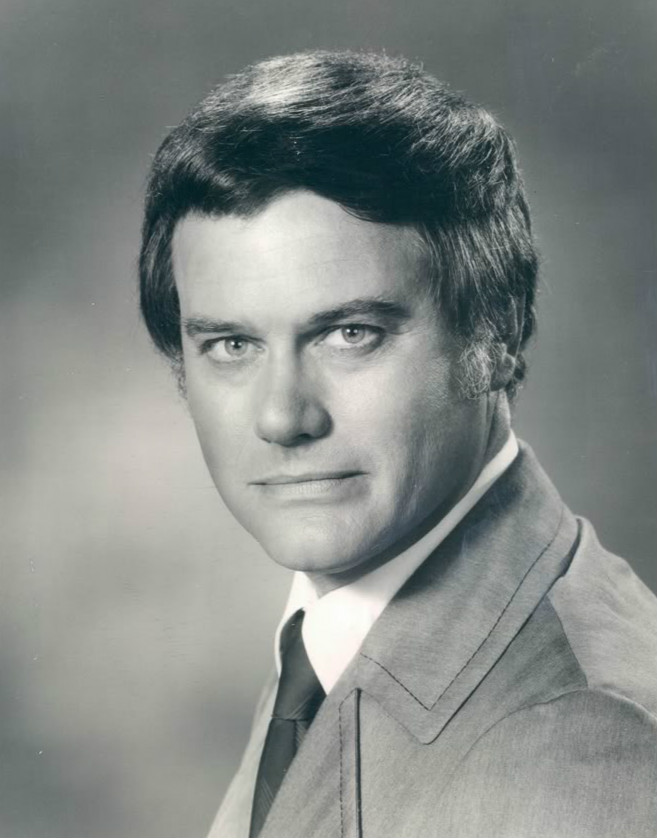
J.R. Ewing (Larry Hagman) is the central antagonist of Dallas, who openly hates Pam.

In the pilot episode of Dallas, Pam and Bobby (Patrick Duffy) elope in New Orleans and are married by a Justice of the Peace. After Bobby brings Pam home to Southfork, she is met with great hostility from the Ewing family for being the daughter of their enemy, Digger Barnes (Keenan Wynn, originally David Wayne). Early on, Bobby's brother, J.R. Ewing (Larry Hagman), accuses Pamela of being a spy for her brother, Cliff Barnes (Ken Kercheval), who is building a case against Ewing Oil, claiming that she passed a very important company file to Cliff. Bobby vigorously defends his wife and the family eventually find out that Pam is innocent. Shortly after the pilot episode, Pam becomes pregnant with Bobby's child. However, she argues with a drunk J.R. and falls from the rafter of a barn, prompting her to miscarry the baby.

After her miscarriage, much of the hostility from the family evaporates, with the exception of J.R. He openly despises her and her brother. In 1979, Pam is told by Digger's doctor that Digger was a carrier of neurofibromatosis, and that she and Cliff, as his children, were carriers; as neurofibromatosis is a potentially fatal disease to infants. Ironically, Pam soon discovers she is pregnant again. As before, however, tragedy strikes as a rattlesnake frightens Pam's horse when she is out riding and throws her, causing a second miscarriage. In 1980, Pam watches Digger die slowly and painfully as a result of his decades of heavy drinking. On Digger's deathbed, he tells Pam that she's not his biological child, but born after an affair her mother Rebecca (Priscilla Pointer) had with Hutch McKinney (William Watson). Overwhelmed by a sense of loss after Digger's death and deathbed confession, she pushes to find out more about what happened to her mother. She develops a notion – a dream born out of grief – that perhaps her mother isn't dead after all. Then a private investigator turns up evidence that her mother had not died as Digger had believed, but was alive in Houston. Meanwhile, Bobby has taken over Ewing Oil while J.R. is convalescing after being shot. Pam watches her husband get deeper and deeper into the heart of business in an effort to prove himself, and takes note of Bobby's instinctive attraction to power, which she realizes might be a danger to their marriage.

The baby issue continue to haunt Pam, after learning that she is unlikely to carry a child past the third month of pregnancy. Her depression culminates in near-fatal tragedy: Pam tries to kill herself by jumping off the top of the place of her employment, The Store. However, Bobby stops her but it is clear that Pam needs psychiatric help. She is admitted to a psychiatric hospital where she can get the help she needs. On a surprise visit to Southfork, Pam walks down the stairs and sees Bobby with a baby boy in his arms. In soaring spirits, Pam quickly settles into her life as mother to Christopher (Eric Farlow, later Joshua Harris), while Bobby handles the adoption proceedings. She and Bobby grow closer during this period. In May 1982, Bobby finally tells Pam about Jeff Faraday (Art Hindle), Kristin Shepard (Mary Crosby) and the fact that J.R. could be Christopher's father. Pam is shocked that Bobby had kept this from her but doesn't hesitate to fly to California with him to find the truth, preparing to fight whoever she had to in order to keep her son. As Rebecca leaves for Houston on business, the Wentworth jet was involved in a midair collision and Rebecca is killed. Pam is devastated – and angry – blaming the contest between J.R. and Bobby for her mother's death. Pam leaves Bobby and they divorce in the fall of 1983. She then begins a relationship with wealthy businessman Mark Graison (John Beck), though he soon learns he has a terminal illness and apparently dies in a plane crash. Pam is unable to accept this and begins searching for Mark, travelling the globe in her efforts, but without success.

By 1985, Bobby and Pam realize that they are still in love. Bobby proposes, Pam accepts and they spend the night together. The next morning, Bobby saves Pam from being hit by a car driven by her deranged half-sister, Katherine Wentworth (Morgan Brittany), but the car hits him instead. He dies hours later, leaving Pam heartbroken. For the next year, Pam goes on to work at Ewing Oil and runs Bobby's interest in the company, while reestablishing her relationship with Mark Graison, who had not died as previously thought. However, the morning after her wedding to Mark, Pam goes into the bathroom and finds Bobby in the shower – alive and well. It transpires that the events of the entire past year were nothing more than a dream she had, and Bobby did not die. Pam and Bobby remarry in 1986, and she receives good news at the end of the 1986–87 season finale: she is finally able to conceive a baby, after confirming that there would be no health risks involved. However, she never gets that chance. While calling her husband to tell him the good news, she is in a massive auto accident where she hits an oil tanker which explodes and she is severely burned in the subsequent fire. While recovering from her burns, she decides to leave Dallas, including Bobby and Christopher, and disappears. She later divorces Bobby for a second time.

Pam made a brief appearance in the season 12 premiere, with a different appearance as a result of plastic surgery (now played by Margaret Michaels). She tells her brother Cliff that she is happy in her new life and plans to marry her doctor David Gordon (Josef Rainer). Later, after Cliff leaves, her doctor asks why she didn't tell Cliff that she has a terminal disease and only has a year to live. This was the character's final appearance in the series, although Pam was not immediately declared dead on the show.

=== Dallas (2012 TV series) ===
During the airing of J.R. Ewing's funeral on March 11, 2013, viewers learned that J.R. had been investigating Pam's disappearance before he died. In the episode "Let Me In", the Ewings discover Rebecca Wentworth left one-third of Barnes Global to her daughter, Pam, which Christopher would inherit in the event of her death. In the episode "A Call to Arms", Christopher tries to have his mother declared legally dead so he can inherit her shares of Barnes Global. In the same episode, an agent named Ellis finds a list of deposits made to a Swiss account that mirror the amount in the trust, indicating there is still activity and implying she remains alive. However, in the episode "Legacies", Pam was finally declared dead. Her plastic surgeon, David Gordon, explains that she had been horribly burned in her 1987 car accident, and left her family because she didn't want them to see the way she looked. She underwent several surgeries in an attempt to reverse some of the badly scarred tissue left by the oil truck explosion. Unfortunately, she had developed pancreatic cancer. She flew to Abu Dhabi to receive an experimental surgery but died on the operating table. According to Pam's death certificate, she was born on April 10, 1950, and died on July 14, 1989, making her only thirty-nine years old at the time of her death. However, this contradicts the flashback scenes of the episode "Jock's Trial, Part II" in Season 3, in which Pamela's mother is pregnant with Pamela after the 1952 presidential election.

== Reception ==
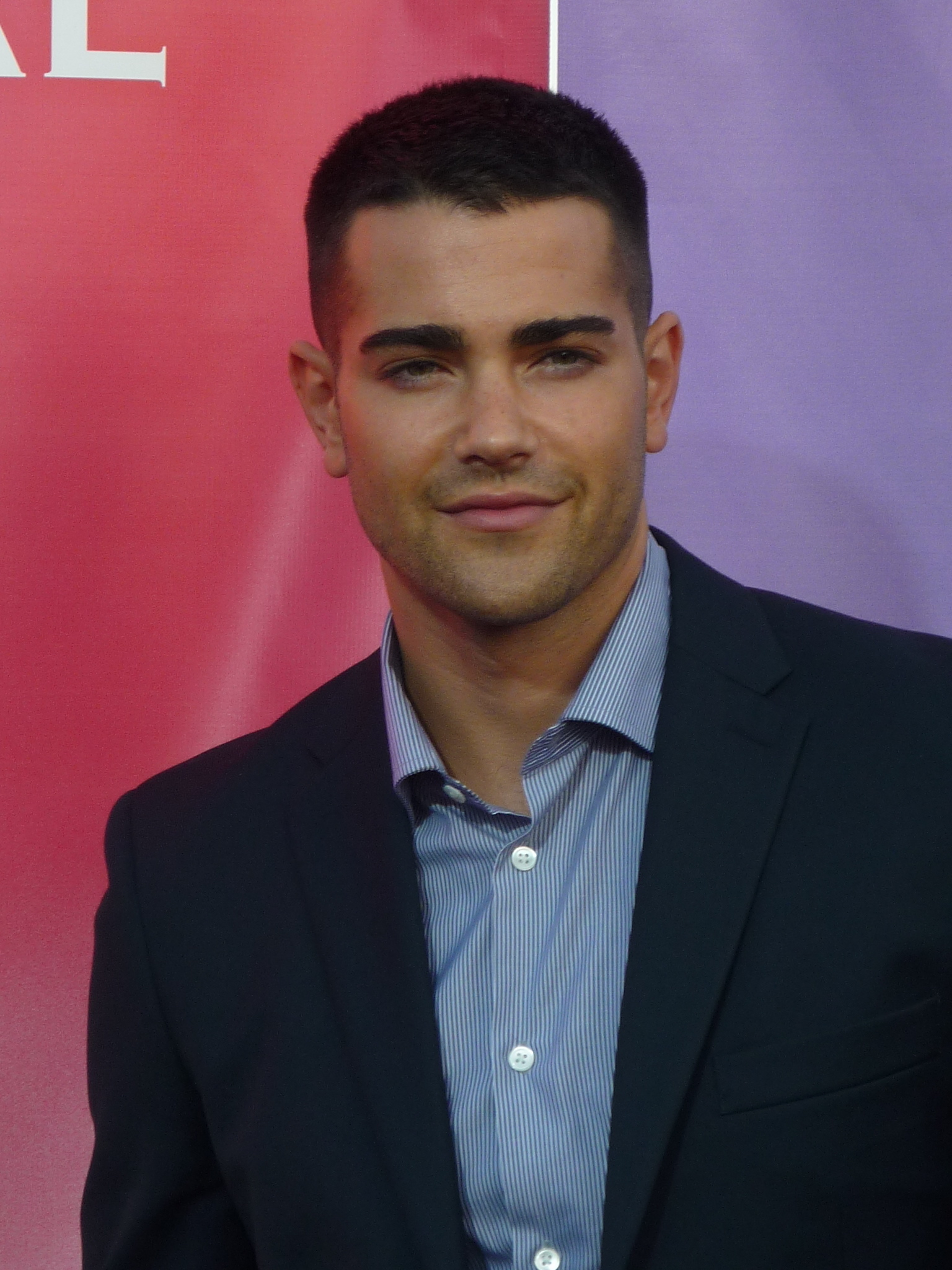
Jesse Metcalfe portrays Pam's adopted son, Christopher Ewing, in the revival of Dallas.

The character of Pamela has been well received by television critics. Principal received a Golden Globe nomination in the category of "Best Actress in a Television Series" at the 40th Golden Globe Awards for her work as Pam. Principal was nominated for a Soap Opera Digest award for "Outstanding Actress in a Leading Role on a Prime Time Serial" in 1986. She also shared a nomination with Patrick Duffy for "Favorite Super Couple: Prime Time" in 1988.

Pamela crashed into an oil tanker at the end of the tenth season of Dallas. The exit storyline was the subject of notable controversy. It was left open ended after Principal left the show and the audience had no idea where the character was going. Hal Erickson of MSN.com said, "Although Victoria Principal had left Dallas at the end of season ten, by the time the series' 11th season rolled around, Principal's character, Pamela Ewing, was still lingering about, swathed in bandages after being seriously injured in a car accident. As if to lead viewers to the conclusion that Pamela would suddenly make a complete recovery in the tradition of her husband Bobby Ewing's (Patrick Duffy) "return from the dead" at the outset of season ten, the ultimate fate of Pamela was left unresolved for several weeks—and further complicated when the poor girl suddenly vanished from her hospital bed."

Patrick Duffy returned to Dallas in 1986 after being absent for an entire season. The whole year's worth of episodes was written off entirely as Pam's dream. The storyline garnered the show a lot of publicity, both good and bad. The Staff of UGO Networks.com said: "Soap Operas are known (and at times hated) for their ridiculously implausible storylines, and while '80s primetime suddser Dallas is still one of our favorite guilty pleasures, even the great Ewing empire is not immune to the absurd storytelling techniques the genre has become associated with. While your average primetime soap operas don't usually mingle with the stuff of sci-fi and horror, there's an incredibly high rate of characters returning from the dead in the genre. Case in point: Bobby Ewing. Presumed dead after being run over by his sister-in-law, Katherine Wentworth, who also happened to be obsessed with him, fans (and CBS) had to do without Patrick Duffy, and even worse, ratings, for one whole season. Thus, Larry Hagman, who played Duffy's onscreen brother and despised oil baron J.R. Ewing, along with network execs, persuaded Duffy to return, making it possible (we're talking in soap opera terms here), for Bobby Ewing's character to come back by writing off the ratings nightmare of a season as a dream... a very bad one."
