= Cliff Barnes =

Fictional character in the American television series Dallas

- Dallas character
- Portrayed by: Ken Kercheval
- Duration: 1978–91, 1996, 2012–14
- First appearance: April 2, 1978; Digger's Daughter
- Last appearance: September 8, 2014; Victims of Love
- Created by: David Jacobs
- Spin-off appearances: Dallas: The Early Years; Dallas: J.R. Returns
In-universe information
- Occupation: Owner of Barnes Global (1990s–2013); Head of the Oil Regulatory Commission (1990–91); CEO of Ewing Oil (1988–89, 1991–96); CEO of Barnes-Wentworth Oil (1982–88); Vice President of Operations, Stonehurst Oil (1982); President of Wentworth Tool & Die (1981–82); Legislative Counsel to Texas State Senator Bobby Ewing (1981); Legislative Counsel to Dave Culver (1980–81); Assistant District Attorney for Dallas County (1980); Head of the Office of Land Management (1979–80); Attorney (1970s)
- Family: Barnes
- Father: Willard "Digger" Barnes
- Mother: Rebecca Barnes Wentworth
- Stepfather: Herbert Wentworth
- Brothers: Tyler Barnes
- Sisters: Catherine Barnes; Pamela Barnes Ewing
- Half-sisters: Katherine Wentworth
- Spouse: Jamie Ewing (1985–87); Michelle Stevens (1991)
- Daughters: Pamela Rebecca Barnes
- Grandfathers: Henry Barnes
- Aunts: Maggie Monahan
- Nephews: Christopher Ewing (adoptive)
- First cousins: Jimmy Monahan

Clifford "Cliff" Barnes, portrayed by Ken Kercheval, is a fictional character from the American television series Dallas.

Cliff is a longtime rival of the Ewing family, particularly J.R. Ewing, with whom he shares one of the most iconic feuds in television history. The animosity between Cliff and J.R. echoes the earlier conflict between their respective fathers, Digger Barnes and Jock Ewing, which began during their days as oil wildcatters in the Great Depression.

Cliff is the son of Digger Barnes and Rebecca Barnes, the brother of Pamela Barnes Ewing, and the half-brother of Katherine Wentworth. Throughout the series, he holds a variety of professional roles, ranging from attorney and assistant district attorney to CEO of multiple oil companies, including Barnes-Wentworth Tool and Die and Ewing Oil.

Cliff is one of only two characters, along with J.R. Ewing, to appear throughout the entire original run of the series. He also appears in the 1996 reunion film Dallas: J.R. Returns and in the 2012–14 continuation series. A running gag throughout the original series is Cliff's fondness for Chinese take-out food.

== History ==
=== Original series ===
During the show's conception, the character of Cliff Barnes was modeled on the late Robert F. Kennedy. However, he soon evolved into a bumbling sad sack and became his own worst enemy. A lawyer and bureaucrat rather than an oilman, Cliff was out of his depth in the cutthroat oil business and, despite repeated attempts, was consistently outmaneuvered by his lifelong rival, J.R. Ewing (Larry Hagman). While Cliff occasionally scored minor victories over J.R., he was ultimately undone by his own naivety and incompetence. However, in the final season, with the help of Carter McKay (George Kennedy), Cliff finally bested J.R. and took over Ewing Oil.

Cliff had a close relationship with his sister Pamela (Victoria Principal) and resented her marriage to Bobby Ewing (Patrick Duffy), J.R.'s younger brother.

When Dallas began, Cliff worked for the state of Texas and had built a reputation as an effective investigator of corruption within the independent oil companies. Not coincidentally, these investigations often targeted Ewing Oil. In the second season, Cliff was leading in the polls during his campaign for the U.S. Senate against a candidate backed by the Ewings, until J.R. leaked to the press that Cliff had arranged an illegal abortion that resulted in the death of his then-fiancée, Penny. Penny had become pregnant by Cliff but refused to have the baby due to her recent admission to law school. Cliff reluctantly honored her wishes, but she died during the operation due to the incompetence of the abortion doctor.

During the second and third seasons, Cliff's career advanced when he was appointed Chief of the Office of Land Management, a fictional but powerful state agency that approved all land-related ventures in Texas, including oil drilling. To remove Cliff from this position, J.R. enlisted attorney Alan Beam (Randolph Powell) to set up an exploratory campaign committee—funded solely by J.R.—promoting Cliff as a candidate for Congress. The ploy succeeded: Cliff resigned to run, but the funding dried up soon after, forcing him to drop out of the race.

Cliff had an affair with J.R.'s wife, Sue Ellen (Linda Gray), during the second season. When Sue Ellen became pregnant, Cliff was believed to be the father. Later, it was revealed that Cliff was a carrier of neurofibromatosis, a genetic disorder he inherited from his father, Digger (Keenan Wynn). Because the disorder poses significant risks to infants, doctors advised against Cliff having children. Fearing for the child’s health, Cliff initially sought custody of John Ross III (Tyler Banks) after Digger publicly claimed Cliff was the father. However, a paternity test later confirmed that J.R. was the biological father.

After his failed Congressional bid, Cliff became an assistant district attorney in Dallas. He later led the prosecution of Jock Ewing (Jim Davis) for a 30-year-old murder, but the case was dismissed after Digger confessed to the crime on his deathbed. In season four, Cliff began working with state senator Dave Culver (Tom Fuccello), believing Culver—son of political icon Sam Culver (John McIntire)—was destined for national office. During this time, Cliff had a romantic relationship with Donna Culver (Susan Howard), Dave’s advisor and widow of Sam. Their relationship ended when Dave was appointed to the U.S. Senate and Donna's political party chose Bobby Ewing over Cliff for Dave's vacant state senate seat. After Bobby won, he appointed Cliff as his chief counsel—mostly as a favor to Pam. The two fell out when Cliff unilaterally launched a Senate investigation into J.R.'s alleged involvement in organizing a counter-revolution in Southeast Asia.

In season four, Cliff’s estranged mother, Rebecca Wentworth (Priscilla Pointer), returned to his life. Cliff eventually forgave her for abandoning him, particularly after discovering her wealth and influence. Rebecca offered him the presidency of Wentworth Tool & Die, a subsidiary of her conglomerate. Cliff initially performed well, but later squandered company funds on a bogus deal orchestrated by J.R. Rebecca fired him, and shortly thereafter Sue Ellen remarried J.R., leading Cliff to attempt suicide.

After his recovery, Rebecca purchased Wade Luce Oil, renaming it Barnes-Wentworth Oil, and installed Cliff as president. Seeking revenge on J.R. for Cliff’s suicide attempt, Rebecca encouraged him to use the company—and its membership in the oil cartel—to fight back. Cliff turned the company into a major success and was named "Oil Man of the Year" at the Oil Baron's Ball. However, his acceptance speech devolved into a tirade against Ewing Oil, resulting in a public brawl. Shortly afterward, Rebecca died in a plane crash, and Cliff inherited Barnes-Wentworth Oil along with a third of Wentworth Tool & Die—much to the dismay of his half-sister Katherine (Morgan Brittany).

During the fifth season, Cliff rekindled his romance with Sue Ellen and proposed, but she rejected him and remarried J.R. instead. Cliff later entered a relationship with aspiring singer Afton Cooper (Audrey Landers), sister of Lucy Ewing's (Charlene Tilton) husband Mitch Cooper (Leigh McCloskey). Afton gave birth to a daughter, Pamela Rebecca, but—angry at Cliff’s dishonesty—she misled him into believing the child wasn’t his. It was only in the penultimate season that Cliff learned the truth.

In 1985, Cliff married Jamie Ewing (Jenilee Harrison), daughter of Jason Ewing and cousin to J.R. and Bobby. Initially, the marriage was strategic, as Cliff believed Jamie had a claim to part of Ewing Oil. However, they eventually developed genuine affection for each other. In April 1986, Jamie was presumed dead after a car explosion, but the entire 1985–86 season was later revealed to be Pam's dream. In reality, Jamie and Cliff never found happiness; she left him in late 1986, and the couple was heading for divorce when she died in a mountain climbing accident.

Cliff eventually realized his long-held dream of acquiring a share in Ewing Oil and briefly enjoyed a good working and personal relationship with Bobby, while J.R. was temporarily sidelined. Notably, Cliff and Bobby grew closer only after Pam’s departure, and Cliff became a caring uncle to Christopher (Joshua Harris), Pam’s adopted son. For a time, Cliff was even welcomed at Southfork Ranch. However, J.R. returned to the business, and tensions resurfaced. Cliff’s obsession with winning back Afton distracted him from Ewing Oil affairs, and he once again fell out of favor with the Ewings. By the end of the series, his feud with J.R. was firmly reignited.

A recurring theme in Cliff Barnes' character arc was social class conflict with J.R. Ewing. Cliff, raised in poverty after the dissolution of the Barnes-Ewing partnership, inherited both resentment and a penchant for heavy drinking from his father, Digger. In contrast, J.R. lived in wealth on Southfork Ranch, dressed impeccably, and entertained lavishly. Cliff, meanwhile, wore cheap suits, lived in a modest condominium, ate takeout Chinese food, and expected his romantic partners to clean his apartment. While J.R. was suave and cunning, Cliff was often portrayed as frugal, emotionally impulsive, and tragically outmatched.

=== Dallas: J.R. Returns ===
Cliff appears in the 1996 film Dallas: J.R. Returns, where, after spending five years at Ewing Oil, he decides he is done with the oil business and looks to sell his shares. He initially makes a deal with WestStar head Carter McKay, but ultimately sells the company to Bobby and Sue Ellen. This decision effectively ends his long-standing feud with J.R., as Cliff comes to realize that reuniting with his family—Afton and his long-lost daughter Pamela—is more important than continuing his rivalry with J.R.

=== Dallas (2012 TV series) ===
Cliff reappears in the 2012 continuation of the series, which is set 20 years after the original series concluded and ignores the events of the two 1990s TV movies.

Although the Barnes–Ewing feud had mostly ended by the conclusion of the original series—with the exception of J.R.—and Cliff had taken control of Ewing Oil in 1991, he inexplicably renews the feud with the Ewings in the revival. His character is portrayed as significantly darker, more sinister, and sociopathic—markedly different from his depiction in the original series.

At the start of the 2012 series, Cliff is involved in a casino business. He returns to Dallas and meets with Bobby at Southfork Ranch, expressing interest in purchasing the property, which Bobby has put up for sale. J.R. interrupts the meeting and warns Cliff against trying to buy the Ewing family home. Cliff later invites his adoptive nephew, Christopher, and his new wife, Rebecca, to dinner and offers to invest in Christopher’s energy project. Christopher declines, suspecting Cliff’s motives and fearing he wants to reignite hostilities. Cliff warns him not to let the Ewings destroy him as they did his adoptive mother, Pamela. In another scene, Cliff arrives at Sue Ellen's office to take her to lunch and discuss politics. When questioned about trying to buy Southfork, Cliff declares, "I will never stop fighting for what is rightfully mine."

At some point between the end of the original series and the 2012 continuation, Cliff founds a multinational corporation, Barnes Global, which owns hundreds of subsidiaries in over 50 countries. His vendetta against the Ewings continues, culminating in his orchestration of a bombing on a methane-extracting rig owned by Ewing Energies. The explosion results in the deaths of Christopher and Rebecca’s unborn twins.

Notably, no mention is made in the series of the neurofibromatosis gene Cliff carries—a storyline from the original series that had once led him to vow never to have children, fearing the risk of the disease being passed on. As this gene is hereditary, the risk to Rebecca or her children would have been significant.

By the end of season two, the Ewings succeed in taking control of Barnes Global, folding it into a larger company known as Ewing Global. Cliff is imprisoned in Mexico, charged with the murder of J.R. Ewing. From prison, he contacts Elena Ramos and reveals evidence of J.R.’s past manipulations, including the fraudulent switching of land deeds involving her father. According to Cliff, J.R. orchestrated the switch so that Elena’s father received a worthless parcel of land, while J.R. acquired a plot rich in oil. Her father died in his efforts to find oil on the barren land, and her brother turned to drug trafficking to buy it back. Cliff urges Elena to take revenge on the Ewings and grants her proxy voting control over the one-third share of Barnes Global he still owns.

In the season one finale, it is revealed that Rebecca Sutter—Christopher’s wife—is actually Cliff’s daughter, Pamela, previously known in the original series as Pamela Rebecca Cooper. Cliff is revealed to be behind Pamela's initial scheme to con Christopher.

Although Pamela later learns that the Ewings framed Cliff for J.R.’s murder, she ultimately chooses to leave him in prison, unable to forgive him for the bombing that caused the loss of her unborn children. Despite this, she gives him the deed to the land that once belonged to his father, Digger Barnes—land he had long believed was rightfully his. However, he remains in prison, unable to enjoy the fruits of that restitution.

== Legacy ==
A restaurant in Vasastan, a district of Stockholm, has operated under the name of the television character since the mid-1990s. In the 1980s, a German punk rock band used the name Cliff Barnes and the Fear of Winning. Indie punk rock band Cliff Barnes from Finland was formed in 1998. They released their debut album in 2023 and did a US tour in 2024.
