= Elena Ramos =

- Dallas character
- Portrayed by: Jordana Brewster
- Duration: 2012–14
- First appearance: June 13, 2012; Changing of the Guard
- Last appearance: September 22, 2014; Brave New World
- Created by: Cynthia Cidre
In-universe information
- Occupation: Engineer; Partner in Ewing Energies
- Mother: Carmen Ramos
- Brothers: Andres "Drew" Ramos

Elena Ramos is a fictional character and one of the primary female leads in the primetime soap opera Dallas on the TNT network, an updated version of the original series of the same name that aired on CBS from 1978 to 1991. Elena is portrayed by Jordana Brewster, and has appeared on the show since its pilot episode, which first aired on June 13, 2012. Dallas follows the trials and tribulations of the wealthy Ewing oil family living in Dallas, Texas.

== Casting and creation ==
=== Casting ===
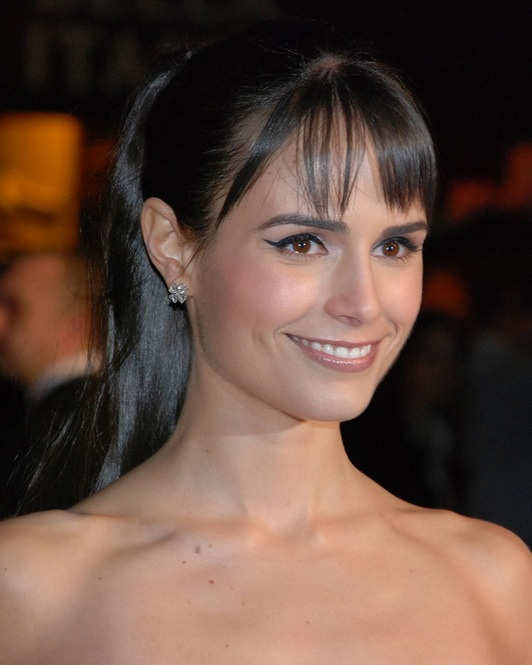
"It's like you're a part of something so iconic. I just hope the fans of the original series like watching the new generation interact with Bobby and J.R. Ewing and Sue Ellen."

On January 29, 2011, Jordana Brewster was the first non-original cast member to sign on for the series continuation. Nellie Andreeva described the role: "The project — written by Cynthia Cidre and Warner Horizon — centres on feuding cousins John Ross Ewing III and Christopher Ewing, the offspring of brothers J.R. and Bobby Ewing, respectively, as they clash over the future of the Ewing dynasty. Brewster will play Elena, the daughter of the ranch’s cook, who is locked in a love triangle with Christopher and John". On February 1, 2011, it was announced that actor Josh Henderson had signed on to play Elena's love interest, John Ross Ewing III.

When asked about both her character and the show, Brewster said: "You know, I'm on the third season now of the original Dallas. It's just so much fun to watch. When I saw our pilot, I got so emotional when the theme song came on. It's like you're a part of something so iconic. I just hope the fans of the original series like watching the new generation interact with Bobby and J.R. Ewing and Sue Ellen. It's kind of like what happens with Fast and the Furious, you get to pick up where characters left off and you get to see them evolve. There is still family drama playing out, there are those who still care about money more than anything and those who care about the family more than anything. There are those age-old themes that are so much fun to watch play out. I'm in a love triangle between John Ross Jr. (Josh Henderson) and Christopher (Jesse Metcalfe). I grew up with the boys on the ranch, so I'm very familiar with their antics. It's a really fun, juicy role to play. I'm also an engineer."

== Storylines ==
Elena Ramos grew up on Southfork Ranch with John Ross and Christopher. She is the cook's daughter and moved to Dallas from Mexico with her parents when she was 8 years old. The three children were close, but Christopher had her heart, and they became engaged after dating in graduate school. However, Pamela Rebecca Barnes (posing as Rebecca Sutter) ended their engagement by sending an email, pretending it was from Christopher, telling Elena not to show up at their wedding because he was done with her. Christopher, believing Elena has ditched him, is heartbroken and eventually seeks comfort in Pamela Rebecca, marrying her.

Elena ends up dating Christopher's cousin and arch-enemy, John Ross. Based on information John Ross digs up, Elena and Christopher learn they were set up, but when Pamela announces she is pregnant with Christopher's twins, he decides to remain with her, and Elena chooses John Ross. However, it gets out that Pamela was lying about her identity and is an impostor of Rebecca Sutter, the actual sister of the con man posing as Pamela's brother. Pamela also admits she was behind the scheme to split up Elena and Christopher. Furious, Christopher files for divorce, swears to take the kids away from her, and reveals the truth to everyone.

Meanwhile, Elena accepts John Ross's marriage proposal, after he and Christopher decide to bury the hatchet and work together, merging Ewing Oil and Christopher's methane energy business as Ewing Energies. However, she overhears John Ross' lies and schemes and breaks off their engagement. Elena and Christopher get engaged again, realizing they should never have split up. They end up having sex, which angers John Ross, and he schemes to ruin their lives. Elena and Christopher continue their relationship, and decide to have a church wedding once Christopher has annulled his marriage to Pamela.

Elena's elder brother, Drew (short for Andres) comes back to town, no longer the criminal he once was. However, John Ross makes it look like he smuggled stolen Mexican goods into the US, and Drew is arrested. Because of this, Elena's shares of Ewing Energies are invalidated and given to Sue Ellen. Upset, Elena, Bobby, and Christopher decide to get revenge on the mother-son duo. Elena is also surprised to learn that Pamela is sleeping with John Ross.

== Reception ==
American blogger and television personality Perez Hilton said, "Good casting choice! Patrick Duffy and Linda Gray will also reprise the roles they made famous on the '80s soap. Larry Hagman has verbally committed to the project, but has yet to sign a deal. This show already sounds scadalicious! Can't wait to check it out!"

After the show aired, Ken Tucker of Entertainment Weekly wrote: "The new TNT version of Dallas that premiered on TNT on Wednesday night is a rare example of an artistically – well, entertainingly, at least — successful TV-classic update. It was all the more impressive for the way it combined members of the original cast with younger-demo-actor draws without quite seeming as cynical as a J.R. Ewing business deal." Tucker concludes: "And overall, Dallas is a solidly constructed soap opera, with strong wooden dialogue and oily plot twists."
