= Margaret Michaels =

American actress

- Born: May 1, 1952 (age 74); Virginia, U.S.
- Occupation: Television actress

Margaret Michaels (born May 1, 1952) is a former American actress best known for appearing as the characters of Pamela Barnes Ewing (#2) and Jeanne O'Brien on the CBS primetime soap opera Dallas, and as Santana Andrade #2 on the NBC daytime soap opera Santa Barbara.

== Life and career ==
Margaret Michaels was born on May 1, 1952, in the state of Virginia. Winner of various beauty contests, she started her acting career after working as a make-up artist for glamour photographers. She moved in front of the camera doing television commercials and print modeling with the Joan Mangum Agency, followed by small parts on various TV shows including Dynasty and guest-starring roles in The Jeffersons and the television series Stingray. After appearing in the 1983 film Scarface and guest-starring on Scarecrow and Mrs. King, Michaels was cast as Santana Andrade on the NBC daytime soap opera Santa Barbara, replacing Ava Lazar.

In the late 1980s, Warner Bros. was looking for a Victoria Principal lookalike to step into the role of Pamela Ewing on the series Dallas, after Principal had left. Late in 1988 Leonard Katzman, the show's producer, cast Michaels and she appeared in the first episode of the 12th season, as Pamela Barnes Ewing. The change in appearance was attributed to plastic surgery after Pam's near-fatal car accident.

In the penultimate season 13, the producers of the series were now looking for a Pam look-alike in order to give Bobby one last fling before his marriage to April Stevens, played by Sheree J. Wilson, and to give Bobby Ewing a chance to say goodbye to his former wife as he did not have the chance when Pamela had left abruptly in 1987. Michaels was asked by Katzman to return to the show, this time not as Pamela Ewing, but as a Pam Ewing lookalike named Jeanne O'Brien. After her stint as Jeanne on the show, Michaels' character was written out.

After Dallas, Michaels acted in an independent movie that was never released, and worked on stage. She is married to Beverly Hills surgeon Dr. Richard William Fleming.
