= Dallas season 13 =

Dallas
- Season 13
- DVD cover
- No. of episodes: 27

Release
- Original network: CBS
- Original release: September 22, 1989 – May 11, 1990

Season chronology
- ← Previous; Season 12 Next → Season 14

The thirteenth season of the television series Dallas aired on CBS during the 1989–90 TV season.

== Cast ==
=== Starring ===
In alphabetical order:

- Barbara Bel Geddes as Miss Ellie Ewing Farlow (19 episodes)
- Lesley-Anne Down as Stephanie Rogers (8 episodes)
- Patrick Duffy as Bobby Ewing (26 episodes)
- Kimberly Foster as Michelle Stevens (21 episodes)
- Larry Hagman as J. R. Ewing (27 episodes)
- Howard Keel as Clayton Farlow (20 episodes)
- George Kennedy as Carter McKay (26 episodes)
- Ken Kercheval as Cliff Barnes (23 episodes)
- Sasha Mitchell as James Beaumont (23 episodes)
- Cathy Podewell as Cally Harper Ewing (25 episodes)
- Charlene Tilton as Lucy Ewing Cooper (17 episodes)
- Sheree J. Wilson as April Stevens Ewing (24 episodes)

=== Also starring ===
- Alexis Smith as Lady Jessica Montford (4 episodes)
- Karen Kopins as Kay Lloyd (3 episodes)
- Denver Pyle as Blackie Callahan (2 episodes)
- Audrey Landers as Afton Cooper Van Buren (1 episode)
- Beth Toussaint as Tracey Lawton (1 episode)

=== Notable guest stars ===
Gayle Hunnicutt (Vanessa Beaumont) appears in three episodes, as does Barbara Stock (Liz Adams). Michael Wilding (Alex Barton) appears in a major story-arc, although he doesn't return for the final season. Leslie Bevis (Diana Farrington) also appears in a major arc, and returns in the final episode as a different character. Margaret Michaels, who played Pamela Barnes Ewing for a season 12 episode, returns as a different character, Jeanne O'Brien, in four episodes. Claude Earl Jones appears in two episodes as Duke Carlisle, a character who will return for the final season, recast with Clifton James in an "also starring" capacity.

== DVD release ==
The thirteenth season of Dallas was released by Warner Bros. Home Video, on a Region 1 DVD box set of three double-sided DVDs, on April 13, 2010. Like the other DVD sets of the show's last five seasons, it does not include any extras, besides the 27 episodes.

== Episodes ==
No. overall	No. in season	Title	Directed by	Written by	Original U.S. air date	Original U.K. air date	Prod. code	U.S. viewers (millions)
308	1	"Phantom of the Oil Rig"	Irving J. Moore	Howard Lakin	September 22, 1989	January 3, 1990	445601	18.2
Due to the European deal, WestStar's oil supply is spread too thin to meet the needs of their Texas based customers, so Bobby and J.R. attempt to make deals with these refineries for Ewing Oil, but they disagree about having to drop some of their old customers to get new ones; Miss Ellie and Clayton learn that the key likely fits a deposit box from a bank somewhere in New England; Cliff's obsession with finding Afton causes him to neglect his duties at Ewing Oil; Tommy returns to Dallas and denies making the phone calls to April; Tommy asks his father for forgiveness and Carter agrees to allow Tommy to work at WestStar, but Tommy's repentance isn't as real as it seems; April's sister Michelle comes to town; J.R. learns it may be more difficult to outmaneuver Carter McKay than he thought.
309	2	"The Leopard's Spots"	Michael Preece	Leonard Katzman	September 22, 1989	January 5, 1990	445602	18.2
Unaware that J.R. has already secretly made a deal with a refinery for more crude than Ewing Oil can supply, Bobby makes a deal with another refinery that will use all of Ewing Oil's reserves meaning that J.R. is all but guaranteed to be in breach of contract on his deal; Miss Ellie and Clayton track down the deposit box, but its contents only leads them on another search; a gallery owner expresses an interest in Cally's paintings as well as an interest in Cally; desperate for crude to meet the terms of his deal, J.R. cuts production at the Ewing Refinery, diverting the crude to the other refinery and then claims it was Bobby's decision; Cliff finally locates Afton in Charleston, S.C. and overhears her say that her ex-husband is really the father of her daughter, however after Cliff leaves Afton is relieved that Cliff will never learn the truth; Tommy obtains a bomb concealed in a briefcase and later makes a veiled remark to Carter about how he hopes to take care of Bobby Ewing.
310	3	"Cry Me a River of Oil"	Dwight Adair	Lisa Seidman	September 29, 1989	January 10, 1990	445603	17.5
Bobby finds out about the deal J.R. made behind his back and he lets J.R. know that he alone will be responsible for any penalties should he breach the contract; April warns Michelle to stay away from Cliff, but when Michelle intercepts Cliff's message to April arranging a dinner date she decides to show up in April's place; Cally is shocked to learn of J.R. and April's prior relationship and, while she forgives J.R. for not telling her, she begins to question the sincerity of April's friendship; when Herr Brundin comes to Dallas to finalize the deal with WestStar, Tommy expresses his disgust that Brundin lied to Carter about aspects of the deal, Tommy meets Brundin out on the street and pushes him into the path of an oncoming truck, killing Brundin; J.R. is able to find some of the oil he needs, but he can't get it shipped to Dallas soon enough, so a tanker owner suggests J.R. buy his own tanker.
311	4	"Ka-Booooom!"	Michael Preece	Louella Lee Caraway	October 6, 1989	January 17, 1990	445604	17.5
J.R. buys an unseaworthy tanker; wanting to end any association with J.R., April decides to sell the land that she and J.R. bought out from under Ewing Oil to Bobby, Bobby declines the offer and doesn't want Cliff to know, Michelle overhears this and tells Cliff; Rose Daniels visits Carter and Tommy takes an immediate disliking to her, believing her to be an opportunistic gold-digger; Tommy's bomb explodes.
312	5	"Sunrise, Sunset"	Dwight Adair	Howard Lakin	October 13, 1989	January 24, 1990	445605	17.9
Bobby suspects Tommy is behind the bomb and when Tommy inadvertently confirms his suspicions, Bobby informs Carter, Carter confronts Tommy and they struggle and Tommy is shot and killed; J.R. celebrates after his tanker finally arrives and he has enough oil to satisfy the terms of his deal; Alex Barton, the gallery owner, rents a studio for Cally to paint in and tells her that professionally, he wants to promote her as Cally Harper; J.R. mentions to Michelle that whoever gets Cliff Barnes to leave Ewing Oil will win the undying gratitude of him and his wallet; Carter is hit hard by Tommy's death and begins to revert to old behaviour; James Beaumont, Vanessa Beaumont's son, arrives in Dallas to see J.R.; April proposes to Bobby.
313	6	"Pride and Prejudice"	Michael Preece	Leonard Katzman	October 20, 1989	January 31, 1990	445606	18.9
Clayton and Miss Ellie continue their search in Pride, Texas, the place where Jock made his first oil strike and which is now nearly deserted; James gathers information about J.R. and Ewing Oil; J.R. and James have a bumpy first meeting, but afterwards quickly bond; Bobby wonders where his little boy went when Christopher becomes interested in a girl; Vanessa arrives in Dallas to take James home.
314	7	"Fathers and Other Strangers"	Irving J. Moore	Lisa Seidman	November 3, 1989	February 7, 1990	445607	18.0
Bobby tries to have 'the talk' with Christopher; having already pumped Kendall for information about J.R., James flirts with Sly and asks her more questions; Bobby and Cliff argue about Cliff's role at Ewing Oil; Miss Ellie and Clayton's search comes to a surprising end in Montana; J.R. gloats after hearing that a WestStar tanker is leaking oil in the Gulf; wanting a big cheque from J.R., Michelle is determined to convince Cliff to leave Ewing Oil; after J.R. speaks poorly of Ray because he is Jock's illegitimate son, James makes a toast to J.R. Ewing, his father.
315	8	"Black Tide"	Michael Preece	Howard Lakin	November 10, 1989	February 14, 1990	445608	17.7
While J.R. is thrilled with the news that James is his son, Cally believes that Vanessa wants to use this to steal J.R. away from her; Carter is enraged after hearing that the WestStar tanker started leaking oil because it was rammed by J.R.'s tanker and wants to blame the entire situation on Ewing Oil; Michelle finally convinces Cliff to leave Ewing Oil and Bobby feels betrayed when Cliff announces at a WestStar press conference that he has left Ewing Oil and that he will be heading a committee to investigate the spill; when Michelle meets with J.R. to collect her cheque for getting Cliff out of Ewing Oil, J.R. refuses to pay her; James tells Vanessa that if she wants J.R. she should fight for him, but she decides to return to Vienna; in return for getting Cliff to head up the committee going after Ewing Oil, Carter promises Michelle that at any time he will grant her one favor, regardless of what it is; James moves into Southfork.
316	9	"Daddy's Dearest"	Irving J. Moore	Mitchell Wayne Katzman	November 17, 1989	February 21, 1990	445609	17.7
John Ross returns from England to find that he is no longer J.R.'s eldest son; April throws Michelle out of her apartment, so Michelle moves in with Cliff; James moves into Cliff's old office at Ewing Oil; Carter serves Bobby with papers to sue Ewing Oil for damages relating to the oil spill and if successful the suit has the potential to put Ewing Oil out of business; Bobby and J.R. try to keep Cliff from heading the committee investigating the spill; James and Michelle meet and there is an instant attraction; Cliff is appointed to head the committee and has plans to use it as a springboard to the governor's office and secures Carter's support for his political aspirations.
317	10	"Hell's Fury"	Patrick Duffy	Lisa Seidman	December 1, 1989	February 28, 1990	445610	18.1
With some encouragement from James, Michelle agrees to spy on Cliff for J.R.; wanting to please J.R., John Ross tries to get know his new brother, but Christopher quickly realizes that while two is company, three is a crowd; while Bobby tries to discover the true cause of the tanker collision, J.R. reverts to his usual tactics to ensure that the committee rules in Ewing Oil's favor; knowing that James wants Cally out of J.R.'s life, Michelle lies to Cally about having an affair with J.R.; Bobby is shocked when Kay Lloyd, his former girlfriend from Washington, D.C., shows up in Dallas to inform him that if the investigative committee rules against Ewing Oil, the Justice Department may revoke his charter for Ewing Oil.
318	11	"Cally On a Hot Tin Roof"	Larry Hagman	Howard Lakin	December 8, 1989	March 7, 1990	445611	18.4
Cally accuses J.R. of having an affair with Michelle and confesses that, in retaliation, she spent the night with Alex Barton; April is jealous of Kay's past relationship with Bobby; J.R. threatens Alex to leave Dallas; J.R. seduces one of the committee members, Diana Farrington, to get her vote to protect Ewing Oil, later he throws his fling in Cally's face and she tells J.R. she lied about sleeping with Alex, J.R. doesn't believe her at first, but when Alex confirms that it's true, J.R. rushes home and is stunned by what he finds in his bedroom.
319	12	"Sex, Lies and Videotape"	Cliff Fenneman	Leonard Katzman	December 15, 1989	March 14, 1990	445612	20.5
The paramedics manage to revive Cally; Bobby is forced to sell three of Ewing Oil's best fields in order to pay for the clean up of the spill and is surprised to learn that the unknown buyer didn't take advantage of his situation and instead paid the full asking price; Carter tracks down Rose Daniels and asks her to come back to Dallas to be with him, but he has an ulterior motive; April rents office space for her oil company; although he and Cally have reconciled, J.R. sleeps with Diana Farrington again telling James that he is doing it strictly for Ewing Oil, but afterwards he feels guilty about betraying Cally and James is disgusted that J.R. would so callously cheat on his wife; wanting Cliff to suppress any information detrimental to WestStar that the investigation may find, Carter blackmails Cliff with a video of Cliff sleeping with Carter's new wife, Rose; Bobby tells April he wants to marry her.
320	13	"A Tale of Two Cities"	Leonard Katzman	Arthur Bernard Lewis	January 5, 1990	March 21, 1990	445613	18.9
Cally has a very successful gallery showing; even though Michelle and Cliff aren't romantically involved, James tells Michelle that he'd like to rent her own apartment so that he doesn't feel like they are sneaking around; Cliff tells Michelle about the video Carter is using to blackmail him and then Michelle informs Bobby; a series of events leads Michelle to believe that James cheated on her with Diana Farrington; Cliff gets information that suggests that the tanker collision was not Ewing Oil's fault, but merely an accident.
321	14	"Judgment Day"	Patrick Duffy	Amy Tebo	January 12, 1990	March 28, 1990	445614	18.9
Cliff struggles with the choice between telling the truth or letting Ewing Oil take full blame for the tanker collision; Michelle tells J.R. that she will no longer be his spy and confesses her deception to Cliff; confident of a guilty verdict against Ewing Oil, Carter offers to buy the company from Bobby before the committee announces its decision and the Justice Department revokes Ewing Oil's charter; Cliff renders the committee's decision.
322	15	"Unchain My Heart"	Irving J. Moore	Jackie Zabel & Bryce Zabel	January 19, 1990	April 4, 1990	445615	18.4
While out celebrating their engagement, Bobby learns that it was April who bought the three Ewing Oil fields and he is initially upset that she went behind his back, but by the time Bobby apologizes, April has already sold them, unknowingly, to Carter McKay; James finally convinces Michelle that he didn't sleep with Diana Farrington; on a high after the committee's verdict cleared Ewing Oil, J.R. is determined to get oil out of the reportedly dry field Jock first struck oil on years ago; Cliff is approached by Stephanie Rogers, who offers to make all his political aspirations come true; Bobby sees a woman he thinks could be Pam.
323	16	"I Dream of Jeanne"	Cliff Fenneman	Lisa Seidman	February 2, 1990	April 11, 1990	445616	17.9
Bobby learns that the woman he believed to be Pam is named Jeanne O'Brien; mistrustful of Stephanie's motives for helping him, Cliff has her investigated for a connection to J.R.; James attempts to get financing for a business venture, but finds it difficult without the Ewing name attached; Cally begins to feel that J.R. is putting Ewing Oil ahead of their marriage; J.R. travels to Oklahoma to locate an old friend of Jock's who he thinks can help him find oil on his dry field; being around Jeanne makes Bobby think of old memories of his life with Pam.
324	17	"After Midnight"	Ken Kercheval	Howard Lakin	February 9, 1990	April 18, 1990	445617	18.3
Bobby begins dating Jeanne, the Pam lookalike (but is it Jeanne he wants? Or Pam? Or does he still want April?); April is hurt when she sees Bobby out on a date with Jeanne; J.R.'s obsession with finding oil finally pays off; Michelle and April wants to open a singles complex, but the owner of the property they want won't sell, so Michelle decides to cash in on the favor Carter promised her and asks him to convince the owner to sell; James tries to become a partner in a lucrative deal, but the daughter of his partner plans to wreck his chances for a partnership unless James gives her what she wants – and what she wants is James.
325	18	"The Crucible"	Larry Hagman	Leonard Katzman	February 16, 1990	April 25, 1990	445618	17.2
J.R. puts a quick end to James' prospective business deal, angering James; Jeanne tells Bobby she's fine indulging Bobby's memories of Pam; Stephanie is doing an excellent job keeping Cliff's name in the public eye; Cally and Michelle get into an argument; J.R. and Cally's marriage continues to deteriorate; Carter comes through for Michelle; Bobby ends his relationship with Jeanne and finally says goodbye to Pam.
326	19	"Dear Hearts and Gentle People"	Irving J. Moore	Louella Lee Caraway	February 23, 1990	May 2, 1990	445619	17.6
Bobby tries to convince April to give him another chance; Miss Ellie and Clayton become involved in a murder mystery; Stephanie succeeds in getting Cliff appointed to the Oil Regulatory Commission; J.R. wants to put an end to Cliff's rise up the political ladder and decides the best way to accomplish that is by bringing down Stephanie; Cally considers leaving J.R., but feels she has nowhere to go, however, as far as J.R. is concerned their marriage is over.
327	20	"Paradise Lost"	Patrick Duffy	Lisa Seidman	March 9, 1990	May 9, 1990	445620	15.0
James and Michelle discover that the property they bought for the single's complex isn't zoned properly for their needs and they have to bring Carter McKay in on the deal in order to get the necessary clout to complete the project; J.R. offers Cally a fake apology, setting in motion his plan to make Cally leave him; J.R. learns that Stephanie is going through a divorce and tries to dig up some dirt on her from her soon-to-be ex-husband; Miss Ellie and Clayton believe they have solved the crime, now they need proof; Bobby tells April that he has done all he can do to prove his love for her and that the next move is up to her.
328	21	"Will Power"	Larry Hagman	Ken Horton	March 16, 1990	May 16, 1990	445621	15.4
Miss Ellie and Clayton continue to investigate the murders and make a gruesome discovery; April comes to a decision about her relationship with Bobby; construction of April and Michelle's single's complex hits a major roadblock; Cally gets a bleak view of the future of her marriage after appearing on a TV talk show featuring women who married older men; J.R. believes he has found the information he needs to take down Stephanie.
329	22	"The Smiling Cobra"	Cliff Fenneman	Howard Lakin	March 30, 1990	May 23, 1990	445622	17.4
J.R. is secretly behind the demolition order for April and Michelle's complex; Michelle is upset when April tells her that she is no longer interested in pursuing the project, and instead wants to focus on her future with Bobby; J.R. learns that James' support is the only thing keeping Cally at Southfork; Bobby and April set a wedding date; James is angry when he learns that the only reason J.R. wrecked the complex project was to ruin James' relationship with Michelle; J.R. finally pushes Cally to leave Southfork, but he is forced to ask her to stay when he sees how much her leaving hurts John Ross.
330	23	"Jessica Redux"	Irving J. Moore	Leonard Katzman	April 6, 1990	June 6, 1990	445623	15.6
Following the latest murder, Clayton and Miss Ellie realize that Clayton was the intended target; concerned that J.R. will use Stephanie to sabotage his rising political career, Cliff demands Stephanie not see J.R. anymore, but Stephanie doesn't like being told what to do; still believing in Michelle's idea even without April's participation, James purchases a restaurant for Michelle; Bobby asks Cliff to be his best man; Michelle is elated when J.R. tells her that James said he was going to marry Michelle, but is heartbroken when James tells her he only said it to annoy J.R.; thinking Clayton's psychopathic sister Jessica may have information regarding the murders, Clayton and Miss Ellie attempt to see her at the sanitarium, but are shocked to learn that she has been released; Cliff fires Stephanie after seeing her having dinner with J.R.; believing she has no future with James or in Dallas, Michelle accepts a high paying job in the Caribbean, but what she doesn't know is that J.R. is behind the offer; Jessica comes after Clayton.
331	24	"Family Plot"	Patrick Duffy	Lisa Seidman	April 13, 1990	June 29, 1990	445624	16.8
Jessica is interrupted before she can attack Clayton; J.R. uses the information he discovered to blackmail Stephanie; James realizes J.R. got Michelle out of town; J.R. calls Sue Ellen and arranges for her to persuade John Ross to visit London, believing it will make it easier for him to get rid of Cally; Stephanie puts an abrupt end to Cliff's gubernatorial aspirations; Jessica makes a full confession; Cally is upset when James tells her he is leaving Southfork; Jessica ends up with the voting rights for 25% of WestStar stock and Clayton intends to go to court to get control of them; after learning the lengths J.R. has gone to get Cally to leave him, Cally and James decide to turn the tables on him.
332	25	"The Southfork Wedding Jinx"	Irving J. Moore	Howard Lakin	April 27, 1990	June 29, 1990	445625	16.2
Putting their plan into motion, Cally tells J.R. that she accepts full blame for their problems and that from now on she won't question where or with whom he has been and James tells J.R. that he was perfectly right to get Michelle out of his life; Cliff meets Liz Adams, an old friend of Bobby's, who was recently left an oil company by her deceased brother; J.R. is not happy when he hears that Clayton intends to form a partnership with Carter McKay if he gets the voting rights to the WestStar stock; Cally reveals to April that she is pregnant and while she wants to leave J.R., she doesn't know if she could deprive her child of knowing its father, especially since she never got to know her parents; Bobby and April get married; as Bobby and April leave for their honeymoon. A mass exodus occurs: Miss Ellie and Clayton leave for a trip to the Orient, John Ross and Christopher go to visit Sue Ellen in London and Lucy moves to Italy; hoping to convince Jessica to sign the WestStar voting rights over to him, J.R. has himself committed to the sanitarium, but not before telling Cally that she has one week to get out of Dallas and out of his life.
333	26	"Three, Three, Three: Part I"	Leonard Katzman	Leonard Katzman	May 4, 1990	July 6, 1990	445626	17.1
James urges Cally to hire a divorce lawyer who then advises Cally to locate J.R. so that she can serve him with divorce papers before he serves her; Cliff tries to convince Liz to move to Dallas and when he introduces her to Carter it's clear that they have a history; in the sanitarium, J.R. has a lot of roadblocks to deal with in trying to see Jessica. NOTE: Mitch Pileggi, who appeared in this episode as Morrissey, would go on to play Harris Ryland in the TNT continuation of Dallas.
334	27	"Three, Three, Three: Part II"	Leonard Katzman	Leonard Katzman	May 11, 1990	July 6, 1990	445627	17.3
Liz tells Cliff that she thought that she recognized Carter McKay as someone she knew a long time ago in New York, but that his name wasn't Carter McKay; James and Cally learn that J.R. had himself committed to the sanitarium and then obtain his release papers by blackmailing the lawyer he had entrusted them to; when J.R. finally gets to see Jessica, he manipulates her into signing control of the WestStar stock over to him; James blackmails J.R. into signing a property settlement for Cally, but then refuses to have J.R. released from the sanitarium.
