= List of Dallas characters =

Here is a list of characters appearing on the 1978–1991 American television series Dallas. During its 14 seasons on air, the show featured 21 regular cast members, portraying twenty characters (as the character of Miss Ellie was recast for season eight). Additionally, hundreds of guest actors portrayed supporting characters; this list includes the most noteworthy.

== Main cast timeline ==
Character	Portrayed by	Seasons													
Character	Portrayed by	1	2	3	4	5	6	7	8	9	10	11	12	13	14
Miss Ellie Ewing	Barbara Bel Geddes	Main	Main	Main	Main	Main	Main	Main		Main	Main	Main	Main	Main	
Miss Ellie Ewing	Donna Reed								M (Note: Reed first appears as Ellie in "Homecoming" (ep. 8.7). She is added to the opening credits from "Oil Baron's Ball III" (ep. 8.8).)						
Jock Ewing	Jim Davis	Main	Main	Main	Main										
Bobby Ewing	Patrick Duffy	Main	Main	Main	Main	Main	Main	Main	Main	G (Note: Credited as "_______".)	Main	Main	Main	Main	Main
J.R. Ewing	Larry Hagman	Main	Main	Main	Main	Main	Main	Main	Main	Main	Main	Main	Main	Main	Main
Pam Ewing	Victoria Principal	Main	Main	Main	Main	Main	Main	Main	Main	Main	Main	(Note: Stand-in.)	G (Note: Margaret Michaels takes over the role in "Carousel" (ep. 12.1), before appearing as Pam's look-a-like Jeanne O'Brien in season 13.)		
Lucy Ewing	Charlene Tilton	Main	Main	Main	Main	Main	Main	Main	Main			G	Main	Main	
Sue Ellen Ewing	Linda Gray	R	Main	Main	Main	Main	Main	Main	Main	Main	Main	Main	Main		G (Note: Gray and Kanaly return in "Conundrum" (ep. 14.22), the series finale set in an alternate universe in which J.R. had never been born. They appear in the opening credits alongside guest stars Mary Crosby (Kristin Shepard), Joel Grey (Adam), Jack Scalia (Nicholas Pearce), Ted Shackelford (Gary Ewing) and Joan Van Ark (Valene Wallace).)
Ray Krebbs	Steve Kanaly	R	Main (Note: Kanaly departs in "The Fat Lady Singeth" (ep. 11.30). He returns to the opening credits from "War and Love and the Whole Damned Thing" (ep. 12.6) to "The Sting" (ep. 12.10).)	Main	Main	Main	Main	Main	Main	Main	Main	Main	Main		G
Cliff Barnes	Ken Kercheval	R	R	Main	Main	Main	Main	Main	Main	Main	Main	Main	Main	Main	Main
Donna Culver Krebbs	Susan Howard		G	R	R	Main	Main	Main	Main	Main	Main				
Clayton Farlow	Howard Keel				G	Recurring	Recurring	Recurring	Main	Main	Main	Main	Main	Main	Main
Jenna Wade	Priscilla Beaulieu Presley		G (Note: Jenna is played by Morgan Fairchild in "Old Acquaintance" (ep. 2.3), and Francine Tacker in "Jenna's Return" (ep. 3.18) and "Sue Ellen's Choice" (ep. 3.19).)	G				R	Main	Main	Main	Main			
Jack Ewing	Dack Rambo								R	R	M (Note: Rambo departs in "Bar-B-Cued" (ep. 10.13). He returns to the opening credits for "Some Good, Some Bad" (ep. 10.24) and "War and Peace" (ep. 10.25).)				
April Stevens Ewing	Sheree J. Wilson										R	R	Main	Main	Main
Michelle Stevens	Kimberly Foster (Note: Foster also plays an unnamed girl in bed with Jack Scalia (Nicholas) in "Tough Love" (ep. 11.6).)													Main	Main
Carter McKay	George Kennedy												R	Main	Main
Cally Harper Ewing	Cathy Podewell												R	Main	Main
James Beaumont	Sasha Mitchell													Main	Main
Stephanie Rogers	Lesley-Anne Down													M (Note: Down is added to the opening credits from "Unchain My Heart" (ep. 13.15) to "Three, Three, Three" (ep. 13.27).)	
Liz Adams	Barbara Stock (Note: Stock previously played Heather Wilson in "The Split" (ep. 5.8) and "Head of the Family" (ep. 5.15).)													R	M

Cast notes

== Supporting characters ==
=== Ewing relatives ===
==== Gary Ewing ====
Garrison Arthur "Gary" Ewing (David Ackroyd in season 2, Ted Shackelford thereafter) was the middle son of Jock (Jim Davis) and Miss Ellie Ewing (Barbara Bel Geddes), husband of Valene (Joan Van Ark) and father of Lucy Ewing (Charlene Tilton). He appeared occasionally between season 2 and season 6, once in season 9, and the series finale in season 14. The character made 11 appearances on the show, Ackroyd for the first two and Shackelford for the remaining nine.

Gary was the middle child, being born after J.R. (Larry Hagman) and before Bobby (Patrick Duffy). He was raised while Jock was at war, and displayed traits of his mother's family, the Southworths, which meant that Jock and J.R. saw him as a weak link. At 17, to try and escape his family, Gary ran away and married 15-year-old Valene and got her pregnant, which resulted in the birth of their daughter Lucy. Valene eventually forced Gary to introduce her to his family, and upon his return Jock and Miss Ellie gave him a home and a job on Southfork Ranch. J.R., who disliked Valene and resented Gary's presence, harassed Gary to the point of alcoholism and forced him off the ranch. Gary disappeared and wound up working as a waiter in a Las Vegas hotel, where he encountered Bobby and his wife Pam (Victoria Principal) in 1978.

Bobby and Pam convinced Gary to return to Southfork, reconciling with Lucy, who engineered a meeting between him and Valene. For a brief while, the three cohabited at Southfork as a family under Jock and Miss Ellie's eyes, but Gary soon felt trapped by Jock's expectations and J.R.'s resentment. Realising that this would send him back to alcoholism, Gary abandoned his family and Southfork. Valene followed, and the two eventually reconciled again and married in season 3. As a gift to the newlyweds, Miss Ellie bought them a house in California, where Gary and Valene settled after their honeymoon.

Gary remained in California, free from the pressures of his family, although he returned to Dallas on several occasions: to visit J.R. in hospital after Kristin Shepard (Mary Crosby) tried to kill him; for Lucy's wedding to Mitch Cooper (Leigh McCloskey); to support Miss Ellie after the death of his father, Jock; and for Bobby's "funeral" during the dream season. Following this, Gary didn't return to Dallas again, although he appeared in an alternate reality in which J.R. had never been born during the series finale: without J.R. to intimidate him, Gary became the eldest son and became a successful divorce lawyer, after inheriting Ewing Oil and running it into the ground. He still met and started a relationship with Valene, although they did not meet for the first time until their middle age (and, subsequently, did not have Lucy). The alternate reality also suggested that, regardless of J.R.'s interference, Gary and Valene were always destined to end up together.

Gary and Valene's backstories and lives in California were the basis of Dallas spin-off series Knots Landing. The couple also appeared for brief story arcs in the revival series.

==== Valene Clements Ewing ====
Valene "Val" Ewing (also Clements, Gibson and Waleska; credited as Valene Wallace in the series finale) was the wife of Gary Ewing (David Ackroyd/Ted Shackelford) and mother of Lucy Ewing (Charlene Tilton). She appeared occasionally between season 2 and season 5, and returned in the series finale in season 14. Van Ark appeared in 8 episodes overall, and featured briefly in uncredited archive footage during season 12.

At 15, Valene was working as a waitress in a restaurant when she met 17-year-old Gary and fell in love with him. They married after three days, and Valene quickly fell pregnant with their child. Valene eventually persuaded Gary to take her on a visit to Southfork Ranch, Gary's childhood home, and introduce her to his family. Gary's mother Miss Ellie (Barbara Bel Geddes/Donna Reed), thrilled at having Gary home, sets them up at Southfork with a home and a job for Gary as a ranch-hand. Gary's father Jock (Jim Davis) liked Valene, and agreed to let them stay, although he tried to pressure Gary into accepting his responsibilities as a husband and soon-to-be father. However, Gary's elder brother J.R. (Larry Hagman) resented Gary's presence and disliked Valene, and harassed the couple, forcing Gary into alcoholism that lead to him abandoning Valene and Southfork. Without Gary to protect her, Valene gave birth to Lucy and was forced off the ranch by J.R.. She eventually returns and took Lucy, fleeing to Virginia and Tennessee in search of her mother, Lilimae Clements (Julie Harris), although J.R. caught up with Valene and snatched Lucy back, threatening to kill Valene if she ever returned to Texas.

In 1978, Valene gets a job at a diner near Lucy's school and the two begin to meet without Lucy's family knowing. They succeed in doing so, which leads to Lucy engineering a reconciliation between Valene and Gary when her uncle Bobby Ewing (Patrick Duffy) and his wife Pam (Victoria Principal) discover him working in a Las Vegas hotel. Gary and Valene reconcile, living with Lucy and the Ewings at Southfork for a while, until Gary realises that Jock's expectations and J.R.'s resentment of him threaten his newfound sobriety. He leaves Southfork and his family again. J.R. tried bribing Valene to do the same, but she turned it down and left anyway, keeping in contact with Lucy and Bobby. She soon tracked Gary down and they resumed their relationship, returning to Dallas in order to marry during season 3. As a gift to the newlyweds, Miss Ellie buys them a house in California, where the couple settle after their honeymoon.

Valene preferred to remain safely in California, far away from J.R., returning only once after her marriage, for Lucy's wedding to Mitch Cooper (Leigh McCloskey). After this, Valene did not return to Dallas but appeared twice more: once with Gary after Jock's death, discussing what to expect from his will, and in an alternate reality during the series finale, in which J.R. was never born: without J.R. to intimidate him, Gary never ran away and married Valene, and thus never produced Lucy. Instead, the pair didn't meet until in their middle-age, when Valene - who had married a Mr Wallace and been widowed - asked Gary to seek an inheritance left to her by her husband. The alternate reality also hinted that, regardless of J.R.'s interference, Gary and Valene were always destined to end up together.

Valene and Gary's backstories lives in California were the basis of Dallas spin-off Knots Landing. The couple also appeared for brief story arcs in the revival series.

==== Garrison Southworth ====
Garrison Southworth (Gene Evans) was the elder brother of Miss Ellie Ewing (Barbara Bel Geddes/Donna Reed), and the original heir to Southfork Ranch. He appeared in one episode of season 2.

Garrison was Miss Ellie's only sibling, and the two had a close relationship throughout their childhoods and into their marriages; Garrison's to Cherie Simmons (Liz Keifer), and Miss Ellie's to oil baron Jock Ewing (Jim Davis), although their marriage was one arranged by their father in order to save Southfork from being repossessed.

During World War II, Garrison served in the American Navy, where his ship was torpedoed and sunk at sea. With Garrison now considered missing in action, Miss Ellie and Jock pushed to have him declared dead in absentia, which would allow Miss Ellie to inherit Southfork upon her father's death. Although she went along with it at the time, Miss Ellie later felt guilty for doing so, as she believed that Garrison, as firstborn, was the rightful heir to the land. However, with nothing to suggest that Garrison was still alive, she and Jock eventually inherited Southfork and split their time between the land and Jock's company, Ewing Oil. To try and soothe herself, Miss Ellie named her second-born son Garrison Arthur (David Ackroyd/Ted Shackelford) in her brother's memory.

In 1979, Garrison was told that he was suffering from terminal cancer and did not have long left to live. Garrison bought a house in Dallas and an old painting of the Southfork Ranch. Accompanied by his companion nurse, Cathy Baker (Melinda O. Fee), Garrison returned to ranch to give Miss Ellie the painting. His reappearance shocked Jock and Miss Ellie, as well as their sons J.R. (Larry Hagman) and Bobby (Patrick Duffy), who are suspicious that Cathy is Garrison's mistress. Garrison and Cathy dine with the Ewings at Southfork, where Miss Ellie offers the ranch back to Garrison, but the dinner ends badly when J.R. questions them about their "motives". Outraged and offended, Garrison leaves, refusing to accept Southfork from Miss Ellie. Bobby and his wife Pam (Victoria Principal) visit Garrison at home the next day, where Cathy tells them about Garrison's cancer and his imminent death. Bobby tells Miss Ellie, who visits Garrison the next day and learns from Garrison himself that he is dying. After clearing it with her family, Miss Ellie helps Garrison move back to Southfork, where he dies shortly afterwards.

During his visit, Garrison seems friendly with Ewing rival Digger Barnes (David Wayne/Keenan Wynn), and seems to agree with him that Jock cheated him and his family out of a fortune.

In season 9, after Bobby's funeral, Miss Ellie visits Garrison's grave, which is situated near a lake on Southfork land. She talks to Garrison at the grave, confiding that she is upset how her family is slowly disintegrating - Bobby has died, J.R.'s wife Sue Ellen (Linda Gray) has left him and taken their son John Ross with her, Gary lives in California and granddaughter Lucy (Charlene Tilton) has moved to Atlanta. However, the season 10 premiere dismisses all of season 9 as a dream, meaning that the location of Garrison's grave may not be accurate.

Garrison also appeared in the Dallas prequel Dallas: The Early Years, portrayed by actor Matt Mulhern, which featured his backstory, his deployment in the war and his marriage to Cherie.

==== Kristin Shepard ====
Kristin Marie Shepard (Colleen Camp in season 2, Mary Crosby thereafter) was the younger sister of Sue Ellen Ewing (Linda Gray), second daughter of Patricia Shepard (Martha Scott) and sister-in-law and mistress of J.R. Ewing (Larry Hagman). She appeared briefly in season 2, regularly between season 3 and season 4, and finally in the series finale in season 14. The character made a total of 30 appearances; Camp for the first two, and Crosby for the remaining 28.

Kristin visited Southfork with her mother upon learning that Sue Ellen was pregnant with her first child, and were warmly welcomed by the Ewing family. Kristin returned later, now studying architecture at university and in need of a job to make ends meet. J.R. took her on as a secretary, having just lost latest secretary Louella Caraway Lee (Meg Gallagher) to her honeymoon, and also got her a condo to live in. In time, the two began an affair, and J.R. used Kristin to find out valuable insider information by getting her to seduce potential business partners. However, J.R. had promised Kristin lavish rewards in exchange for this, and when he failed to deliver she became angry and ended their affair. In revenge, she shot him at Ewing Oil (an event triggering the Who shot J.R.? phenomenon). She was not immediately - or at all - suspected, as J.R. had angered many people, some of whom had greater reason to want him dead. Suspicion instead fell on Sue Ellen. However, Sue Ellen soon found out about J.R. and Kristin's affair, and deduced that it was Kristin who had shot her husband. Sue Elle confronted Kristin by the pool at Southfork in J.R.'s presence. J.R. went to telephone the police, but Kristin stopped him with the revelation that she was pregnant with J.R.'s child. J.R. agreed not to press charges and Kristin moved away, gladly accepting a monthly check from J.R. to cover her living expenses.

Kristin later returned claiming to have borne J.R.'s child, and demands more money from J.R.. However, soon after her return, Cliff Barnes (Ken Kercheval) finds Kristin's corpse floating in the Southfork pool, with J.R. staring down at it from the balcony. Although J.R. was initially suspected of her murder, it was later revealed that Kristin had taken angel dust and had tripped, hit her head and fallen from the balcony while under the influence of drugs. After her death, Bobby and his wife Pam (Victoria Principal) bought her baby, Christopher (Eric Farlow/Joshua Harris), from a man called Jeff Farraday (Art Hindle), who claimed to be Kristin's boyfriend at the time of her death. After some help from legal professionals, Bobby and Pam legally adopt Christopher, and discover that Christopher was not actually J.R.'s baby - Kristin had miscarried the child shortly after leaving Dallas. Upon finding out, she had married Jeff and had his child, in order to continue exploiting J.R. for money.

Kristin reappears in the series finale, in an alternate reality in which J.R. had never been born. Kristin, having not fallen in love with J.R., shot him, and died in the Southfork pool, had instead become a successful con artist, posing as a woman in a prostitution sting.

Kristin also appeared in the second season of Dallas spin-off Knots Landing, being bailed out of prison by J.R.'s brother Gary (Ted Shackelford) and his wife Valene (Joan Van Ark).

==== Patricia Shepard ====
Patricia Shepard (Martha Scott) was the mother of Sue Ellen Ewing (Linda Gray) and Kristin Shepard (Colleen Camp/Mary Crosby), and grandmother of John Ross Ewing III (Tyler Banks/Omri Katz) and Christopher Mark Shepard (Eric Farlow/Joshua Harris). She appeared briefly in season 2 and season 3, before returning for a more regular role in season 9. Scott appeared in 10 episodes overall.

Patricia was a protective and snobbish woman, abandoned by her alcoholic husband when Sue Ellen and Kristin were still children. She groomed her daughters for marriages to rich and important men, as this boosted Patricia's social standing. This led to a strained relationship between herself and Sue Ellen, who disliked the way Patricia had dominated her childhood by forcing her to dress and behave in certain ways. Patricia, in turn, disliked that Sue Ellen became a beauty queen, although she changed her mind when Sue Ellen's beauty contests lead her to meet J.R. Ewing (Larry Hagman), which resulted in her eventual marriage. However, after the wedding, Sue Ellen kept minimal contact with her mother and sister; she only reluctantly invited them to stay upon falling pregnant with her son, John Ross (Tyler Banks/Omri Katz). Patricia and Kristin returned after John Ross was born, and Patricia doted on her grandson; however, Sue Ellen remained uncomfortable with their presence.

Following Kristin's death in 1981, Sue Ellen and Patricia grew closer, attending the funeral together in Albuquerque. Following Kristin's death, Patricia moves to Europe.

In season 9, Patricia returns, having been informed that Sue Ellen has been institutionalised following a severe relapse into alcoholism. She promptly arrives at Southfork, much to the displeasure of Miss Ellie (Barbara Bel Geddes/Donna Reed), who disliked Patricia's flighty attitude. Patricia rents a property near Southfork, frequently visiting John Ross and taking in Sue Ellen after she is released following her detoxification. She and Sue Ellen attend several social functions together, often at a table near the Ewing family, and Patricia reluctantly supports Sue Ellen as she seeks legal separation from J.R. and full custody of John Ross, although she often suggests a reconciliation, preferring that over the idea of Sue Ellen settling down with recently returned lover Dusty Farlow (Jared Martin). Despite Sue Ellen declaring that she will never return to J.R., they both overcome their differences and J.R. invites Sue Ellen back to live at Southfork. Sue Ellen lets Dusty down, and after an emotional talk, mother and daughter part amicably, and Patricia moves back to Europe. However, the season 10 premiere dismisses all of season 9 as a dream of Pam Ewing (Victoria Principal), meaning that Patricia's visit to Dallas did not actually occur.

==== Dusty Farlow ====
Steven "Dusty" Farlow (Jared Martin) is the biological nephew and legal son of Clayton Farlow (Howard Keel), and the on-off lover of Sue Ellen Ewing (Linda Gray). He appeared between season 3 and season 6, again between season 8 and season 9, and once more in season 14. Martin appeared in 34 episodes overall.

Dusty was the son of Jessica Farlow (Alexis Smith) and Atticus Ward (John Larch), the result of an affair between the two. To avoid the scandal of an unwed teenage pregnancy, Jessica gave the baby to her brother Clayton and his wife Amy, before moving to England and marrying a member of the aristocracy, Lord Montford. Dusty grew up on the Southern Cross Ranch, believing he was Clayton and Amy's natural child.

Dusty first meets Sue Ellen at a rodeo hosted on Southfork Ranch. Sue Ellen had recently given birth to her son, John Ross, but his birth had complicated her life, as Sue Ellen was unsure as to whether John Ross' father was her husband, J.R. (Larry Hagman), or her former lover, J.R.'s enemy Cliff Barnes (Ken Kercheval). She was adamant that the baby was J.R.'s, but J.R. refused to believe her and Cliff was threatening her with a paternity suit; Dusty offered Sue Ellen genuine love and affection, and they quickly began an affair. Dusty soon began pressuring Sue Ellen to leave J.R. and move in with him at the Southern Cross Ranch, but she is reluctant to leave the security of Southfork. Dusty finally gives her an ultimatum: she must decide whether to leave or stay with J.R. by the time he returns from a rodeo on the other side of Texas. Sue Ellen ultimately decides to leave J.R. and move in with Dusty; however, soon after making her choice, she learns on the news that Dusty's plane came down over a forest and he is presumed dead. The shock of his supposed death sent Sue Ellen back into alcoholism on the same night that J.R. was shot, to the extent that she could not remember where she had been or what she had done. As the prime suspect for J.R.'s shooting, Sue Ellen was arrested, although she was released when her bail was paid by an unidentified person. Sue Ellen began investigating and eventually discovered that Dusty was still alive, living in a house just outside Dallas, and had paid her bail at the police station. Their reunion was bittersweet, as Dusty was now paralysed from the waist down, and he didn't want Sue Ellen to give up her life caring for him. However, Sue Ellen was adamant that she loved Dusty, and left J.R. for him. As J.R. was unwilling to let her leave with John Ross, she convinced sister-in-law Pam (Victoria Principal) to smuggle John Ross out to her at the Southern Cross Ranch.

Sue Ellen, Dusty and Dusty's father Clayton quickly settle into life at the Southern Cross with John Ross, although J.R. continues to harass them from Southfork, visiting the Southern Cross via helicopter to try and get John Ross back. Eventually, having had enough, Dusty hires armed guards to monitor the ranch and to observe J.R. during his visits, making sure he doesn't try to kidnap John Ross. J.R. gets round this by bringing his mother, Miss Ellie (Barbara Bel Geddes/Donna Reed), on a visit. While Miss Ellie is cuddling John Ross, J.R. moves her to the helicopter and tries to bundle her and John Ross on board, in full view of Sue Ellen, Dusty and the guards, knowing that they wouldn't shoot at Miss Ellie or John Ross. However, Miss Ellie is horrified at J.R.'s tactics and returns John Ross to Sue Ellen and Dusty. The pair continue living at the Southern Cross, although Sue Ellen soon realises that Dusty will not be happy in a relationship with her; although no longer paralysed, he has discovered that he is impotent, and feels that Sue Ellen is throwing away her chance at a family if she stays with him. After an emotional discussion, Sue Ellen leaves the Southern Cross and moves into a townhouse in Dallas, and Dusty joins a traveling rodeo circuit. Sue Ellen continues visiting Clayton at the Southern Cross, having struck up a friendship with him, and is surprised while, on a visit, Dusty returns to the ranch with a wife, Linda (Melody Anderson). Sue Ellen is hurt, but accepts their relationship and wishes them both well before they return to the rodeo circuit.

Dusty reappears a few years later, divorced from Linda and looking for a reconciliation with Sue Ellen. Her second marriage to J.R. has hit a rocky patch, and the death of Bobby Ewing (Patrick Duffy) has only worsened things. Sue Ellen relapses again, wandering drunkenly through alleyways, before being brought to a detoxification ward where J.R. and Dusty both trace her to. They meet and fight at her bedside, but Dusty is ejected as he is of no relation to her. Upon Sue Ellen's release, she moves in with her mother Patricia (Martha Scott) and begins a tentative relationship with Dusty, who helps her stay sober, but interference from Patricia and J.R.'s genuine attempts at a reconciliation mean that Sue Ellen eventually returns to J.R., their relationship stronger than before. However, the season 10 premiere writes off all of season 9 as a dream of Pam Ewing's, meaning that Sue Ellen and Dusty's renewed relationship never happened.

Dusty returns several years later. In the elapsing time, J.R. has tried to buy Jessica Montford's share of WestStar stock, in order to overthrow business enemy Carter McKay (George Kennedy). Jessica has been institutionalised for her unstable mental health, following a killing spree after the death of Atticus Ward, and J.R. has posed as a mental patient to infiltrate the asylums and get her signature. His ploy failed, however; his wife Cally (Cathy Podewell) and son James Beaumont (Sasha Mitchell) had arranged for him to be permanently institutionalised, and Jessica had been moved to a different location soon afterward. Upon getting his release, J.R. learnt that Dusty had controlling interest in Jessica's shares while she was institutionalised, and Dusty had sold her shares to Carter, as revenge for J.R.'s previous treatment of Sue Ellen. His actions meant that J.R. lost his chance to be majority shareholder at WestStar, and this - combined with the collapse of Ewing Oil and his family abandoning him - led to his considering suicide.

==== Amanda Lewis Ewing ====
Amanda Lewis Ewing (Lesley Woods in season 3, Susan French in season 8) was the first wife of Jock Ewing (Jim Davis). She appeared twice, played once by each actress.

Jock and Amanda married in 1927, shortly before Jock, his brother Jason and wildcatter Digger Barnes) (David Wayne/Keenan Wynn) struck their first oil well. Shortly after the wedding, Amanda suffered a nervous breakdown, which brought about early-onset dementia; the same thing had happened to her mother. Upon placing Amanda in a mental hospital, Jock was told her condition was unlikely to improve and was advised to divorce her. Jock refused to do so, as he still harboured feelings for her; however, he realised that he had feelings for Ellie Southworth (Barbara Bel Geddes/Donna Reed), and wished to marry her. He divorced Amanda quietly and remarried to Ellie, never telling her or his family about Amanda. He still visited Amanda at the mental hospital, but as his family grew and his business expanded, Jock's visits became more and more infrequent.

The Ewings visited Amanda at the hospital twice. The first time, Jock and Miss Ellie visited with their son Bobby (Patrick Duffy) and his wife Pam (Victoria Principal), after the family discovered Amanda's existence following Jock's aborted trial for the murder of Hutch McKinney (William Watson). Amanda mistook Bobby for Jock, and spent the day talking to him and reminiscing with him while Jock, Miss Ellie and Pam looked on. The second time, Bobby and his brother J.R. (Larry Hagman) were engaged in a battle with Cliff Barnes (Ken Kercheval) for ownership of Ewing Oil, following the arrival of their cousin Jamie (Jenilee Harrison), who claimed to have paperwork proving that Ewing Oil was split equally between Jock, their uncle Jason, and Cliff's father Digger. Amanda had the necessary paperwork, and J.R. and Bobby visited her in order to retrieve it.

Amanda also appeared in the prequel movie Dallas: The Early Years, played by Diane Franklin, which gave more detail onto her background than was explained in the parent programme.

==== John Ross Ewing III ====
John Ross Ewing III (uncredited babies in season 2 and season 3; Tyler Banks between season 4 and season 6; Omri Katz thereafter) was the only, long-awaited child of J.R. (Larry Hagman) and Sue Ellen Ewing (Linda Gray). The character was born in season 2 and appeared frequently from there, totalling 190 appearances: 38 by Banks, and 152 by Katz.

The birth of John Ross - named after his grandfather Jock (Jim Davis) - was traumatic, being delivered by emergency caesarean following Sue Ellen's involvement in a drink driving incident. This followed his mother's time in a sanatorium, after descending into alcoholism and embarking on an affair with J.R.'s sworn enemy, Cliff Barnes (Ken Kercheval). Following his birth, J.R. and Sue Ellen showed no interest in the child; J.R. refused to believe that he was the father, and Sue Ellen suffered from post-natal depression, meaning John Ross was mostly cared for by his grandmother Miss Ellie (Barbara Bel Geddes/Donna Reed) and aunt Pam (Victoria Principal).

Throughout his childhood, John Ross had to survive, among other issues, being kidnapped by grieving mother Priscilla Duncan (Sheila Larken); the constant on-off relationship and custody between his parents; rivalry with his cousin Christopher (Eric Farlow/Joshua Harris); being kidnapped again, by terrorist B.D. Calhoun (Hunter von Leer); his father's remarriage to a much younger woman, Cally (Cathy Podewell); moving to England with his mother and new stepfather, Don Lockwood (Ian McShane), and travelling back and forth between London and Texas; and the sudden arrival of his elder half-brother, James (Sasha Mitchell).

John Ross had a bigger role in the revival series, wherein he and Christopher stepped into the role previously held by their fathers, J.R. and Bobby (Patrick Duffy).

==== Mitch Cooper ====
Dr. Mitchell "Mitch" Cooper, M.D., (Leigh McCloskey) was the two-time husband of Lucy Ewing (Charlene Tilton) and elder brother of Afton Cooper (Audrey Landers). He appeared regularly between season 4 and season 5, before returning briefly in season 8 and season 12. McCloskey appeared in 46 episodes overall.

Mitch met Lucy through mutual friend Muriel Gillis (Karlene Crockett) at Southern Methodist University, while Mitch was studying to become a doctor. Mitch was amused by Lucy's upper-class attitude, especially because he himself was from a poor background; his father had died when he was a teenager and Afton was younger, meaning their mother Arliss (Anne Francis) worked several jobs in order to support the family. Mitch and Lucy started a relationship, quickly moved in together and married, with Lucy's parents Gary (Ted Shackelford) and Valene (Joan Van Ark) travelling from California especially for the ceremony. It did not take long before the couple met difficulties - not least because Afton slept with Lucy's uncle J.R. (Larry Hagman) during the reception. Mitch was dedicated to his studies and believed that any money being spent in their house was earned honestly; however, Lucy preferred to rely on her family's money and enjoy herself modelling, becoming "Miss Young Dallas" in 1982. Mitch disliked Lucy's modelling career, preferring that she be a homemaker, in keeping with his traditional upbringing, but Lucy refused to concede and became a freelance model. She did briefly convince Mitch that she could keep home and model, but this was a ruse uncovered by Mitch when he came home early and encountered the cleaning woman Lucy had hired. Lucy's time as a freelance model turned bad, when photographer Roger Larson (Dennis Redfield) became obsessed with Lucy and, after stalking her, kidnapped her, keeping her bound and gagged in his apartment. Lucy's aunt and uncle, Pam (Victoria Principal) and Bobby Ewing (Patrick Duffy) eventually tracked Lucy down and freed her, but Lucy was so scarred from her experience with Roger that she could not bear to be touched by a man - especially when she discovered that she was pregnant, the result of Roger raping her while she was in captivity. By this point in their marriage, Mitch had become a successful plastic surgeon at Dallas Memorial Hospital and had embarked on an affair with an older patient, divorcée Evelyn Michaelson (Patty McCormack). Lucy confronted Evelyn and learnt the truth, which was the death knell for the marriage; Mitch and Lucy got divorced, and Mitch transferred to a hospital in Atlanta.

A few years later, Mitch returns to Dallas on a training course and meets Lucy again. They rekindle their romance, and Mitch reveals that he and Evelyn didn't last long after their divorce. Lucy had by now matured, and was attracted to the lifestyle that Mitch could offer her; Mitch in turn was attracted by Lucy's newfound maturity and practicality. They remarried at Southfork Ranch and left for Mitch's home in Atlanta on the night before Bobby was killed by Pam's half-sister Katherine Wentworth (Morgan Brittany). However, Bobby's death was revealed to be a dream of Pam's in season 10.

Lucy returned in season 11 to visit her family, but Miss Ellie (Barbara Bel Geddes/Donna Reed) sensed that something was wrong in Atlanta. Lucy revealed that she and Mitch were going through another rough patch, and she had walked out on him. Mitch arrived at Southfork shortly afterwards, wanting to talk to Lucy and work things out, but she told him that their marriage was over and sent him back to Atlanta. They later divorced.

==== Amos Krebbs ====
Amos Krebbs (William Windom) was the presumed-biological father of Ray Krebbs (Steve Kanaly). Windom appeared in two episodes of season 4.

Amos married Ray's mother, Margaret Hunter, toward the end of World War II and after Margaret's affair with Jock Ewing (Jim Davis). Margaret's affair had left her pregnant with Ray, but she didn't tell Amos about the pregnancy until after the wedding, in order to make him believe that the baby was his. The couple settled down in Margaret's hometown of Emporia, Kansas, where Amos quickly became known as the town drunkard. Ray was born shortly afterwards, and when he was three years old, Amos abandoned his family. When Ray was fifteen, Margaret became terminally ill with cancer; to try and create a stable future for Ray, Margaret sent him to Southfork Ranch with a note for Jock explaining the circumstances of his arrival. Both Jock and his wife, Miss Ellie (Barbara Bel Geddes/Donna Reed), knew that Ray was the son of the woman Jock had an affair with in the war, but agreed not to say anything.

In 1980, Amos tracked Ray down to Dallas and turned up outside his house. Ray is upset to see him and wants nothing to do with him, but Amos hangs around and eventually Ray and his wife Donna (Susan Howard) ask Amos what he wants. Amos reveals that, upon Margaret's death, he inherited her diaries, and upon reading them learnt of Ray's true parentage; the only person who had known up to then, apart from Margaret, was Margaret's sister Lil Trotter (Kate Reid). At first, Ray refused to believe Amos, but is convinced when Amos produces the diaries. To keep silent about the truth, and save Ray and the Ewings from scandal, Amos blackmails Ray and Donna for $1,000 before leaving.

In season 6, Lil called Ray to inform him that Amos has died in Emporia. Ray and Donna return there for the funeral, meeting up with Lil and her son Mickey.

==== Lillian Trotter ====
Lillian May Trotter (née Hunter), known colloquially as "Aunt Lil" (Kate Reid), was the maternal aunt of Ray Krebbs (Steve Kanaly) and mother of Mickey Trotter (Timothy Patrick Murphy). She appeared on a regular recurring basis between season 6 and season 7, with a brief return in season 9. Reid appeared in 17 episodes overall.

Lil's sister Margaret married Amos Krebbs (William Windom) and bore him a son, Ray, although she confided in Lil that Ray's biological father might be Jock Ewing (Jim Davis), an airman she had met at a military hospital in England during World War II. Lil agreed to keep Margaret's affair a secret, although she did not know Jock was Ray's father until Ray and his wife Donna (Susan Howard) arrived in Ray's hometown, Emporia, Kansas, for Amos' funeral. A few years before his death, Amos had visited Ray in Dallas and given him Margaret's diaries, which revealed that Ray was Jock's son.

It had been some time since Ray last visited Lil in Kansas, and in the meantime she had been left a widow with a delinquent teenage son, Mickey (Timothy Patrick Murphy), who Lil referred to by his full name "Michael". Mickey had been in trouble with the law numerous times, and spent his time riding around Emporia on a motorbike and working occasional shifts at a local garage, and despite this Lil still defends him to the community. Ray and Donna, but especially Ray, were aghast at Mickey's behaviour and the way he spoke to Lil. Determined to instil some form of respect in his younger cousin, Ray offers to take Mickey back to Southfork Ranch, which would give Lil a break from his behaviour, and give Mickey a chance to learn some responsibility. After much deliberation, Lil agreed to let Mickey go back to Dallas with Ray. Although Lil enjoyed not having to keep Mickey in check, she felt lonely and constantly called the Krebbs' in Dallas; in the end, Donna convinced her to fly down from Kansas and stay with them. Upon arriving, Lil was pleasantly surprised to see that Mickey had quieted down and started a relationship with Ray's recently divorced niece Lucy Ewing (Charlene Tilton); Lil liked Lucy and gave her consent to the relationship. Lil was present at Southfork when Sue Ellen Ewing (Linda Gray), having relapsed into alcoholism after discovering her husband J.R. (Larry Hagman) in bed with oil magnate Holly Harwood (Lois Chiles), tries driving off the ranch in J.R.'s car. Mickey tries to stop Sue Ellen causing an accident, but they are involved in an accident caused by J.R.'s enemy Walt Driscoll (Ben Piazza). Sue Ellen remains unscathed, but Mickey is rendered comatose and paralysed from the neck-down. Lil is distraught.

Lil found it hard watching Mickey struggle to adapt with his newfound paralysis, but was hopeful when he seemed to be accepting of the situation. However, when a cardiac arrest put him in another coma, Lil decided to let Mickey die with dignity. With Ray holding the door closed against the doctors, Lil kissed Mickey goodbye and turned the machine off. Ray took the blame for Mickey's death, in order to spare Lil the pressure of a trial, and he was eventually convicted for murder on a suspended sentence.

During season 9, Ray's sentence affects his and Donna's adoption of Tony (Solomon Smaniotto); to try and save their case, they fly Aunt Lil down from Kansas to give a full explanation of the story. The tactic works, and Lil's impassioned plea and explanation convinces the judge that Ray and Donna would be good candidates to be Tony's foster parents. However, as the whole of season 9 is revealed to be a dream of Pam Ewing (Victoria Principal) in the season 10 premiere, Lil's return to Dallas and the adoption story never occurred in the show's continuity.

==== Mickey Trotter ====
Michael "Mickey" Trotter (Timothy Patrick Murphy) was the maternal cousin of Ray Krebbs (Steve Kanaly), the son of his aunt Lil Trotter (Kate Reid). He appeared regularly between season 6 and season 7. Murphy appeared in 26 episodes overall.

Mickey was raised by his widowed mother in Emporia, Kansas, and in his teenage years he fell into delinquency and dropped out of high school. By the time Ray and his wife Donna (Susan Howard) visit Emporia, for the funeral of Ray's stepfather Amos (William Windom), Mickey spends his time cruising around town on a motorbike, working odd jobs while on probation for car theft. Although Lil defends Mickey to Ray, and the local community, Ray is aghast at the lack of respect Mickey shows for his mother and is determined to instil some discipline into him before he returns to Dallas. While talking to Donna, Lil tells her that she is finding it increasingly difficult to cope with Mickey's behaviour. Donna tells Ray, the couple offer to take Mickey back to Dallas with them, to give Lil a break and offer Mickey a chance at responsibility. Lil accepts their offer, after clearing it with Mickey's probation officer.

Mickey accompanies Ray and Donna back to Dallas and is made a hand at Southfork Ranch. Mickey dislikes the situation, especially because he has to share with the other hands when he would much rather live with Ray and Donna, but Ray is sure that, by living with the other hands and experiencing some hard work, Mickey will become more responsible and have a better appreciation for his life in Emporia. However, Mickey is quickly distracted by Ray's recently divorced niece, Lucy Ewing (Charlene Tilton), who he met during the Ewing barbecue. At that time, Lucy was recovering from both her divorce from Mitch Cooper (Leigh McCloskey), her rape at the hands of psychotic photographer Roger Larson (Dennis Redfield) and terminating the subsequent pregnancy. While Ray was adamantly against the relationship, Mickey gently pursued Lucy, helping her get over her trauma and showering her with the attention she had been starved of with Mitch. Lucy soon reciprocated his feelings, and the two began a relationship with Ray and Donna's reluctant blessing. The two were very happy together: both Mickey and Lucy matured after they got together, and Lucy soon began thinking of marriage. However, these plans were cut short when, after discovering her husband J.R. (Larry Hagman) in bed with oil magnate Holly Harwood (Lois Chiles), Lucy's aunt Sue Ellen Ewing (Linda Gray) suffered an alcoholic relapse and, while drunk, stole the keys to J.R.'s car in a bid to leave Southfork. Mickey and Lucy tried to stop Sue Ellen driving, and Mickey jumped into the car as it passed, wrestling with Sue Ellen for the wheel. As the car left Southfork property, they collided with a car driven by Walt Driscoll (Ben Piazza), one of J.R.'s many scorned business partners, who believed J.R. would be driving. The accident sent Sue Ellen and Mickey's car flying into a ditch at the side of the road. While Sue Ellen suffered only minor injuries, Mickey was rendered comatose and taken to hospital. When he regained consciousness, doctors discovered he was paralysed from the neck down.

Ray, Donna, Lil and Lucy kept a vigil at Mickey's bedside, watching as Mickey grew more frustrated at his inability to move. Mickey disliked feeling like a burden to people, and offered Lucy a chance to leave him, but she refused; however, he ended their relationship shortly afterwards when Lucy kept discussing marriage. However, Mickey soon suffered a cardiac arrest and fell back into a coma. Upset by this setback, Lil decided that Mickey was past saving and opted to end his life with some dignity by unplugging the life support system, which she did as Ray held the door closed against a barrage of doctors.

Ray took the blame for turning off the machines in order to spare Lil anymore upset, and was subsequently charged with Mickey's murder; however, a sympathetic judge only handed him a suspended sentence. For years afterward, Ray felt guilty for Mickey's death, believing that if he had never brought Mickey back to Southfork, he would not have died.

==== Christopher Ewing ====
Christopher Ewing (uncredited babies in season 5; Eric Farlow between season 6 and season 8; Joshua Harris thereafter) was the biological son of Kristin Shepard (Colleen Camp/Mary Crosby) and Jeff Farraday (Art Hindle), who was eventually adopted by Bobby (Patrick Duffy) and Pam Ewing (Victoria Principal). The character first appeared as a baby in season 5 and appeared frequently from there, totalling 156 appearances: 44 by Farlow, and the subsequent 112 by Harris.

Initially believed to be the result of an affair between Kristin and Bobby's brother J.R. (Larry Hagman), Christopher was illegally bought by Bobby from Jeff after Pam discovered she was barren. Bobby and Pam legally adopted Christopher shortly afterwards, and a DNA test proved that he was not J.R.'s child. Christopher then settled down and was raised mostly at Southfork Ranch with his cousin, John Ross (Tyler Banks/Omri Katz).

During his childhood, Christopher had to survive his parents' divorce and subsequent remarriage, rivalry with John Ross, discovering he was adopted, discovering that Jenna Wade's son Lucas is his half-brother, being abandoned by Pam following her car accident, a custody battle between Bobby and Christopher's biological aunt Lisa Alden (Amy Stoch), and the murder of his stepmother April (Sheree J. Wilson).

Christopher had a bigger role in the revival series, where he (Jesse Metcalfe) and John Ross stepped into the roles previously held by their fathers, Bobby and J.R..

==== Lady Jessica Montford ====
Lady Jessica Montford (née Farlow) (Alexis Smith) was the criminally insane younger sister of Clayton Farlow (Howard Keel) and biological mother of Dusty (Jared Martin). She appeared in seven episodes of season 7, before returning for a further four in season 13.

While still a teenager, Jessica embarked on a relationship with Atticus Ward (John Larch), a friend of Clayton's, and fell pregnant; afraid of what Clayton would do to Atticus if he found out, Jessica claimed not to know who the father was, and handed the child over to Clayton and his wife Amy after it was born. To avoid the scandal of an unwed teenage pregnancy, Jessica was shipped off to England, where she married into the aristocracy. She frequently returned to the Farlow homestead, the Southern Cross Ranch, in order to see Dusty; however, she quickly became jealous of the relationship between Dusty and Amy. When Amy was bedridden by flu, Jessica visited to care for her. She waited until Clayton and Dusty were busy ranching and then set the ranch alight. Amy died in the fire, and the origins of the fire remained undiscovered for many years, with Clayton blaming himself for it. Shortly after the fire, Jessica returned to England.

When Clayton was preparing to marry Miss Ellie Ewing (Barbara Bel Geddes/Donna Reed), Donna Krebbs (Susan Howard) discovered Jessica's existence while preparing the guest list. Wondering why Clayton had never mentioned her before, the Ewing family invited her to Southfork Ranch and welcomed her with open arms, despite Clayton's apprehension. Jessica bestowed gifts upon the family and was thrilled to see Clayton again, reminiscing with him about their childhood and past, although she privately disliked the idea of Clayton marrying again. She confided this in J.R. Ewing (Larry Hagman), Clayton's future stepson, who disliked the idea of his mother remarrying; finding common ground, they agreed to try and prevent the wedding. However, J.R. soon discovered why Clayton was apprehensive about having Jessica visit: she was mentally unstable, and in order to stop the wedding happening she kidnapped Miss Ellie by placing her, bound and gagged, in the trunk of her car and driving across Texas. Horrified, and regretting ever plotting to stop the wedding, J.R. pursued Jessica with help from his brothers Bobby Ewing (Patrick Duffy) and Ray Krebbs (Steve Kanaly), eventually tracking her down to a motel in the desert. After rescuing Miss Ellie from the trunk, a police standoff ensued, as they believed Jessica to be armed and she had holed herself up in the motel room. She refused to come out until Clayton, via megaphone, convinced her to. Upon emerging, it was clear that Jessica was mentally unsound, and she explained her motives: she regretted giving Dusty away to Clayton and Amy, and resented the idea of another woman - in this case, Miss Ellie - fulfilling the role of Dusty's mother. She explained how she started the fire at the Southern Cross, and apologised to Clayton for her actions, explaining that she never intended to hurt him. Clayton gently forgave her, and arranged to have her placed in a mental hospital after her trial.

Several years later, Atticus Ward is presumed dead when his yacht is shipwrecked. He leaves behind a vast business empire and a complicated video will. Clayton and Miss Ellie attend the will-reading, as does Atticus' twin Arlen (John Larch) and friends Carter McKay (George Kennedy), Curley Morrison (Charles Cooper) and "Rabbit" Hutch (Eddie Firestone). Atticus' will leaves everything to Curley, should he survive the year; if he does not, then everything passes to Rabbit. If he dies, everything goes to Arlen; if he dies, everything goes to Clayton; and if he dies, everything goes Carter. At the wake, Curley drops dead after drinking a glass of milk, and is discovered poisoned. Everyone blames Rabbit, who protests his innocence, and is eventually found hung at his home, seemingly confirming his guilt. However, it is revealed it would have been impossible for Rabbit to hang himself, as there was nothing nearby that he could have kicked away - meaning Rabbit was also murdered. Arlen is then killed, drugged and stuffed into the large tropical fish tank in his living room, in which he drowns. In the interests of safety, the police move Clayton and Miss Ellie into a hotel under police guard. Jessica follows them, disguised as a maid, Jessica gives the police guard drugged coffee. When he is unconscious, Jessica slips into Clayton and Miss Ellie's room, drugging the glass of water on Clayton's bedside table. However, Miss Ellie is woken by her noise and turns the light on. Jessica flees, but not before Clayton recognises her. At first, they do not believe that it could be her, but Clayton learns that Jessica was released from her mental hospital six months earlier. The police search for her, but she evades them and waits until the Oil Baron's Ball, when Atticus Ward - who had not died in the shipwreck, and had been stranded on an island in the Bahamas - was poisoned while giving a toast. The police surround the area and capture Jessica, who explain that she had committed the murders because, after the deaths of all those mentioned in the will, Dusty would inherit Atticus' business empire. She added that, again, she didn't want to hurt him; unlike the others, she had arranged for Clayton to be poisoned with something painless and instantaneous. Once again, Clayton forgives her and arranges for her to be put in a high-security mental asylum.

Several months later, J.R. begins plotting a takeover bid for WestStar Oil, and begins accumulating shares. To gather enough shares, he arranges to have himself institutionalised in the same asylum as Jessica, and convince her to sign her shares over before getting himself removed. While J.R. meets Jessica and begins his preparations to have her sign her shares over, she is moved to a different location before he can get her signature. He tries to get himself removed, but his vengeful son James Beaumont (Sasha Mitchell) arranges to have J.R. permanently committed there. By the time J.R. manages to escape, with help from his estranged wife Cally (Cathy Podewell), he learns that Carter McKay had already bought Jessica's shares from Dusty, who has controlling interest in them while she is institutionalised. By missing out on Jessica's shares, J.R. lost his chance to overthrow WestStar. Shortly afterward, J.R. was tricked into selling his stake in Ewing Oil to Cliff Barnes (Ken Kercheval), and this - coupled with his family abandoning him - led to him considering suicide.

==== Jamie Ewing ====
Jamie Ewing Barnes (Jenilee Harrison) was the sister of Jack Ewing (Dack Rambo) and the daughter of Jason Ewing, Jock Ewing's (Jim Davis) estranged brother. She appeared regularly between season 8 and season 10. Harrison appeared in 70 episodes overall.

Jamie and her brother Jack were raised by Jason after the death of their mother, Nancy. The three eventually settled in Alaska, where Jason earned a living wildcatting. Jamie was enthralled by the oil business and learnt everything she could from Jason, with whom she had a close relationship. Before his death in 1984, Jason told Jamie about her family in Texas, and about how he, Jock, and Digger Barnes had founded Ewing Oil together. Jason also held documentation to prove that Ewing Oil was divided equally between the three founders, which meant that Jamie now had ownership of the company. Deciding to claim her share of the company, Jamie journeyed to Southfork Ranch, where she was eagerly welcomed by all except her cousin J.R. (Larry Hagman), who remained suspicious of her and accused her of being an imposter. After proving that she was Jason's daughter, Jamie settled at Southfork and formed a close friendship with J.R.'s wife Sue Ellen (Linda Gray).

When Jamie presented her evidence that Ewing Oil was split equally between the three original founders, she started receiving attention from Cliff Barnes (Ken Kercheval), the brother of her cousin Bobby's (Patrick Duffy) ex-wife Pam (Victoria Principal). Cliff was initially taken with Jamie, and his feelings were reinforced when he realised that they stood a better chance of gaining Ewing Oil ownership as a couple. With that in mind, he proposed, and he and Jamie married soon afterward. J.R. was horrified at the idea of another marriage between the Ewings and Barneses, especially as it was Cliff who married into the Ewing family. Frustrated with J.R.'s constant critiques of Cliff, as well as his adamant claim that Ewing Oil was solely Jock's, Jamie and Cliff launched a court case over the Ewing Oil ownership, with Pam on their side. Jamie was thrilled when Jack arrived in Dallas after the trial began, but it was Jack's arrival that caused Cliff and Jamie to lose the case: Jack had proof that Jock had bought Jason and Digger out of the company shortly after it was formed. Jack walked away with 10% of Ewing Oil - J.R. and Bobby gave him 5% each, as a token of thanks - while Jamie realised that Cliff's chief motivation for marrying her was the Ewing Oil ownership, which strained their marriage, and they both started considering divorce.

In season 9, Cliff and Jamie were reunited when they supported Pam and her son Christopher (Joshua Harris) through Bobby's death, realizing and reaffirming their feelings for each other. While Cliff focussed on supporting Pam, Jamie busied herself with arrangements for Katherine Wentworth (Morgan Brittany), her half-sister-in-law, who had killed Bobby and died herself in the process; she did so more as a favor to Cliff, knowing that he and Pam had wanted nothing to do with Katherine. In the meantime, Jack had become involved with Angelica Nero (Barbara Carrera) and the goings-on at Ewing Oil. It proved fatal for Jamie, who was killed in a car bomb intended for Jack in the season finale. However, the whole of season 9 was written off as a dream of Pam's in season 10, meaning that neither Bobby, Katherine, Jamie, or Sue Ellen (who was seemingly killed by a bomb in J.R.'s office) had died, and also that Cliff and Jamie had not reconciled. Instead, the pair drifted further and further apart, eventually separating after Cliff had an affair with Jamie's former sister-in-law, April Stevens Ewing (Sheree J. Wilson). Jamie filed for legal separation, said a final goodbye to Cliff, and arranged to live in California, managing the California branch of Valentine Lingerie for Sue Ellen. Some months later, word reached the Ewings that Jamie had been killed while rock climbing with friends in Mexico. As she and Cliff had not yet divorced, he and Pam arranged Jamie's funeral.

Jamie has the notoriety of being the only Dallas character to be killed off twice: first via the bomb in the Dream Season, and again - albeit off-screen - in season 10.

==== Japhet and Boaz Harper ====
Japhet Harper (Sherman Howard) and Boaz Harper (Cliff Potts) were the elder brothers of Cally Harper Ewing (Cathy Podewell). They both appeared only in season 12, for 5 and 4 episodes respectively.

Japhet and Boaz were significantly older than Cally, and had raised her following the deaths of their parents when Cally was still a child. The siblings lived on the family farm in Haleyville, Alabama, and Japhet and Boaz tended the farm while Cally worked as a waitress at Haleyville's hotel. They were extremely protective of Cally and when they found her in bed with J.R. Ewing (Larry Hagman) at the hotel, they marched him to the police station and had him arrested and imprisoned in a chain gang for rape. However, the Harper brothers bribed a guard to break J.R. out of prison and return him to the Harper farm. They imprisoned him in a barn for several days and made him work on the farm, before making him dig his own grave by moonlight and threatening to shoot him. However, they changed their minds when Cally interrupts proceedings and tells them that she loves J.R.. The brothers reluctantly agree to let J.R. live, as long as he confesses his love for Cally and marries her in a (literal) shotgun wedding. To Cally's delight, J.R. confesses his love and they marry, settling down on the farm. It doesn't take long before J.R. flees Haleyville, leaving Cally and her brothers behind.

After Cally tracks J.R. to Southfork Ranch she occasionally suggests that Japhet and Boaz visit them, an idea vetoed by J.R. even after he falls in love with her.

==== Debra Lynn Beaumont ====
Debra Lynn Beaumont (née Warren) (Deborah Tucker) is the estranged wife of James Beaumont (Sasha Mitchell). She appeared in 5 episodes of season 14.

James and Debra Lynn married when they were still teenagers, and below the age of consent, meaning that Debra Lynn's parents objected to the marriage and petitioned for an annulment. James left before the steps were taken, and assumed the annulment took place, but Debra Lynn later found out she was pregnant and her parents decided to drop the annulment. This meant that James was also a father - and that his recent marriage to Michelle Stevens (Kimberly Foster) was bigamous. When it is made public that James is the son of J.R. Ewing (Larry Hagman), Debra Lynn approached J.R. with both the news of their legal marriage and J.R.'s grandson, Jimmy (Chuckie and Kenny Gravino). As J.R. despised Michelle, and was thrilled at being a grandfather, he sided with Debra Lynn and put her up in a hotel. However, he was also worried that, if James' marriage to Michelle was not legally binding, it meant J.R. would not have a stake in Ewing Oil, which Michelle had bought in its entirety from LeeAnn De La Vega (Barbara Eden). He tried keeping James and Debra Lynn apart, by not telling James about Debra Lynn and by telling Debra Lynn that James was away on business, at least until he is sure that he can secure his 50% of Ewing Oil, but Debra Lynn gets restless and arrives at Southfork Ranch, shocking James and Michelle.

James is shocked that his marriage to Debra Lynn was never annulled, but is thrilled that he is a father and heaps adoration onto Jimmy. He finds himself torn between Michelle and Debra Lynn, and is pressured by both into picking one or the other. Although he tries to make his relationship with Michelle work, Cliff Barnes (Ken Kercheval), who wants to romance Michelle in order to get control of Ewing Oil, tells James that the most important thing in a man's life is his son. Acting on this advice, James decides to pick Debra Lynn. Together with Jimmy they leave Southfork for Debra Lynn's hometown, telling J.R. that he was always welcome in their house.

==== Jimmy Beaumont ====
James Richard "Jimmy" Beaumont Jr. (Chuckie and Kenny Gravino) was the son of James (Sasha Mitchell) and Debra Lynn Beaumont (Deborah Tucker). He appeared in 3 episodes of season 14.

Jimmy's parents married while very young, and separated soon afterwards. Initially, Debra Lynn's parents planned to annul the marriage after James left her, but upon finding out she was pregnant decided not to do so. James did not know of Jimmy's existence until Debra Lynn tracked him down to Dallas and got in contact with his father, Jimmy's grandfather, J.R. Ewing (Larry Hagman). Upon finding out about Jimmy's existence, James and J.R. were thrilled, and lavished him with love and affection. The only person not thrilled to see him was his stepmother, Michelle Stevens (Kimberly Foster), as Debra Lynn's reappearance meant that her marriage to James was bigamous.

Eventually, James decided that his marriage to Michelle wasn't going anywhere, and decided to reconcile with Debra Lynn after Cliff Barnes (Ken Kercheval) told him of the importance of having a son. Jimmy moved with his parents to Debra Lynn's hometown. His departure saddened J.R., who had grown attached to Jimmy and was reluctant to see him go, although James and Debra Lynn told him that he would always be welcome at their house.

=== Barnes relatives ===
==== Digger Barnes ====
Willard "Digger" Barnes (David Wayne in season 1, Keenan Wynn thereafter) was the father of Cliff Barnes (Ken Kercheval) and the legal and presumed-biological father of Pamela Barnes Ewing (Victoria Principal/Margaret Michaels). He appeared intermittently between season 1 and season 3, with 14 total appearances (four by Wayne, and the remaining ten by Wynn).

An oil wildcatter with a nose for drilling, longtime alcoholic, and rival of Jock Ewing (Jim Davis) and former boyfriend of Miss Ellie Ewing (Barbara Bel Geddes and Donna Reed), who he claimed was "the love of his life". He signed a partnership agreement with Jock in 1939 concerning Ewing 23, and later fell out with him over the profits of Ewing 6, causing a long running feud between the families which lasted many decades. Married Rebecca Blake (Priscilla Pointer) in the 1940s, and had four children (two of whom, Tyler and Catherine, died in infancy). Killed Hutch McKinney (William Watson) in a rage in 1952, who had been having an affair with his wife and subsequently gotten her pregnant. On his deathbed, Digger confessed to the murder and his motives, both clearing Jock of the murder and revealing to Pam that he was not her biological father.

==== Jimmy Monahan ====
Jimmy Monahan (James Canning in season 1, Philip Levien in season 2) was the younger cousin of Cliff Barnes (Ken Kercheval) and Pamela Barnes Ewing (Victoria Principal), the son of their paternal aunt Maggie Monahan (Sarah Cunningham). He appeared once in the first season, and once in the second.

Jimmy attended the Ewing family barbecue with his uncle Digger Barnes (David Wayne/Keenan Wynn) and cousins, wherein he had a brief encounter with Lucy Ewing (Charlene Tilton), before helping remove his drunken uncle from creating a scene. Following this, and a brief appearance in the second-season premiere, Jimmy disappeared from the show and was not referred to again, by either his cousins or his mother.

==== Maggie Monahan ====
Margaret "Maggie" Monahan (née Barnes) (Sarah Cunningham) was the sister of Digger Barnes (David Wayne and Keenan Wynn), and the aunt-come-mother figure to his children, Cliff (Ken Kercheval) and Pamela (Victoria Principal). She appeared twice in season 2, twice in season 3 and once in season 8.

Following Digger's descent into alcoholism, and his separation from wife Rebecca (Priscilla Pointer), widowed Maggie became the central mother figure in Cliff and Pam's upbringing, moving into Digger's house and taking over domestic duties. She shared a house with Digger until his death, whereupon she moved to Corpus Christi, and maintained frequent contact with Pam through letters. When Cliff and his then-girlfriend Mandy Winger (Deborah Shelton) visited her, it had been some time since she and Cliff had seen each other.

In the first two seasons, Maggie had a son, Jimmy (James Canning and Philip Levien). Following the second-season premiere, the Jimmy character was forgotten and not referred to again. In the second-season episodes "Double Wedding", Maggie mention's rushing off to help cousin Rose who is never referred to again either.

==== Ed Haynes ====
Edison Faraday "Ed" Haynes' (Robin Clarke) was a man whom Pamela Barnes Ewing (Victoria Principal) had hastily married and divorced as a teenager. He made one appearance in season 2.

When on a tournament as a cheerleader in high school, Pam had met Ed the night before his deployment to the Vietnam War. While both drunk, the pair had married. When Pam broke the news to her father, Digger (David Wayne/Keenan Wynn), he and Pam's aunt Maggie (Sarah Cunningham) collected Pam from the tournament and brought her home, taking steps to begin an annulment of the marriage. They succeeded in doing so, and Ed was quickly forgotten.

Ed returned to Texas many years later, having spent decades detained in a Vietnamese prison camp, and tracked Pam down to The Store, where she was working. He was unaware that his marriage to Pam had been annulled. In the meantime, Pam had happily remarried to Bobby Ewing (Patrick Duffy) and assumed Ed had died in action. His return caused friction between Pam and Bobby, as well as threatening the future of Bobby's construction business, because Ed claimed the marriage was never annulled, a claim strengthened by the fact that nobody knew what had happened to the documents. Despite searching Digger's house, neither Pam nor Maggie could find the paperwork; it was eventually found, after Bobby urged his brother J.R. (Larry Hagman) to intervene with government officials. When confronted with the paperwork, Ed left Dallas.

==== Hutch McKinney ====
Hutchinson "Hutch" McKinney (William Watson) was the ex-lover of Rebecca Barnes Wentworth, and biological father of Pamela Barnes Ewing (Victoria Principal). He appeared in one episode of season 3.

Hutch was the ranch foreman at Southfork Ranch, and while working there began an affair with Rebecca, who was married to Digger Barnes (David Wayne/Keenan Wynn). During their affair, Rebecca became pregnant. Barnes was the enemy of Hutch's employer Jock Ewing (Jim Davis). Jock discovered Hutch had been stealing and selling calves and padding the feed bills, Jock fired Hutch and ordered him off Southfork. Hutch stole Jock's gun before leaving the ranch, and later that night visited Rebecca, convincing her to leave Digger and start a new life with him, Cliff, and their unborn child. Before they could leave, Digger returned and caught them together. He and Hutch began to fight, but the fight ended with Digger losing his temper and killing Hutch with Jock's gun. In a panic, Digger buried Hutch's body on Southfork land, and moved to Corpus Christi with Rebecca. Rebecca gave birth to a daughter, Pamela, and passed the child off as Digger's.

Almost thirty years later, Hutch's skeleton and Jock's gun are found when Ray Krebbs (Steve Kanaly) is given the land and digs it over, planning to build a house. The skeleton is identified, and Jock is arrested and put on trial for Hutch's murder when it is discovered he was shot. At the same time, Digger's decades of alcoholism are catching up with him, and he is on his deathbed. Before dying, Digger gathers the Barnes and Ewing family - and Jock's legal team - together, and confesses the circumstances of Hutch's death and Pam's paternity before dying.

==== Rebecca Barnes Wentworth ====
Rebecca Barnes Wentworth (née Blake; also Burke) (Priscilla Pointer; Victoria Principal briefly played the character in a season 3 flashback) was the wife of Willard "Digger" Barnes (David Wayne/Keenan Wynn), widow of Herbert Wentworth (John Martin) and mother to Cliff Barnes (Ken Kercheval), Pamela Barnes Ewing (Victoria Principal) and Katherine Wentworth (Morgan Brittany). She appeared regularly between season 3 and season 6. Pointer appeared in 44 episodes overall.

At 17, illiterate Rebecca married Digger Barnes after falling pregnant with their eldest child, Tyler, who died six months later of neurofibromatosis, a gene inherited from Digger. Following Tyler was son Cliff, and a daughter, Catherine, who also died of neurofibromatosis when she was twelve months old. The deaths of Tyler and Catherine, coupled with Digger's alcoholism and lack of a job, drove a miserable Rebecca into having an affair with Hutch McKinney (William Watson), a farmhand at Southfork Ranch. During their affair, Rebecca fell pregnant. Hutch was fired shortly afterwards when ranch owner Jock Ewing (Jim Davis) - Digger's sworn enemy - discovered the cattle theft of Hutch, and Hutch stole Jock's gun out of spite. He visited Rebecca and convinced her to leave Digger and start a new life, with their child; however, Digger returned home and caught the two together. When confronted with Rebecca's pregnancy, and her intention to leave, Digger and Hutch fought, which resulted in Digger shooting Hutch and killing him. After hastily burying Hutch's body on Southfork, Digger and Rebecca moved to Corpus Christi, where Rebecca gave birth to a daughter, Pamela, who was passed off as Digger's own.

The reconciliation lasted only a year, before Rebecca walked out on Digger again. Believing her to be dead, Digger brought in his sister Maggie Monahan (Sarah Cunningham) to raise Cliff and Pam, who were also told that Rebecca had died. Now free of Digger, Rebecca changed her name to Burke, developed her reading and writing skills, and became secretary for Herbert Wentworth. They fell in love, married (despite Rebecca not divorcing Digger, though the marriage may well have been dissolved after her desertion and presumptive death), and had a daughter of their own, Katherine. Rebecca made sure to keep her previous family a secret, which she did until Herbert's death in 1981. Shortly before his death, Pam tracked Rebecca down and tried at a reconciliation, but Rebecca brushed her off and lied to Herbert about Pam's identity.

Herbert's death shortly afterward meant Rebecca inherited his company, Wentworth Tool & Die, and she became a major shareholder in the larger Wentworth Industries. She then allowed herself to build a relationship with Pam. Rebecca eventually became the mother that Pam and Cliff had yearned for, introducing them to their half-sister Katherine and delighting in becoming a grandmother for Christopher (Eric Farlow), Pam and Bobby Ewing's (Patrick Duffy) adopted son. The relationship between Rebecca and her abandoned children became so strong that she divided Wentworth Tool & Die equally between Cliff, Pam and Katherine in her will - something that did not sit well with Katherine.

In 1982, J.R. Ewing (Larry Hagman) faked geological reports that caused Cliff to invest a fortune in dry land, believing it was rich in oil. Cliff gathered the funds by embezzling money from Wentworth Tool & Die, and when Rebecca found out, she sacked Cliff from the company and cut him off. This was followed by the end of Cliff's relationship with Sue Ellen Ewing (Linda Gray), when J.R. persuaded her to remarry him. These events drove Cliff to attempt suicide by swallowing a bottle of pills. Infuriated, Rebecca bought Luce Oil from Wade Luce (Robert Ackerman), renamed it "Barnes-Wentworth Oil", and allowed Cliff to run it, telling him that she would support him in crushing the Ewing business empire.

In 1983, Cliff and J.R. were in competition again, fighting over an oil well in the Middle East. When Cliff was suddenly prevented from flying to the oil well, Rebecca volunteered to go in his place, knowing that she would defeat J.R. by acting as Cliff's proxy buyer. However, Rebecca's plane collided during take-off with an incoming plane; although Rebecca was taken to hospital, she died from her injuries after seeing Cliff, Pam and Katherine for a final time. In her will, she left Pam and Katherine her shares and seats on the board at Wentworth Industries, and left Cliff sole ownership of Barnes-Wentworth Oil. Her death triggered the breakdown of Pam and Bobby's marriage, and led to their eventual divorce.

In the revival series, Rebecca's will was revisited, confirming the division of her estate, and also that a third of the Barnes Global company passed to Christopher following Pam's death in 1989. However, this does not align with events seen on the original series as Rebecca had nothing to do with Barnes Global, which was a new company Cliff formed sometime after he took over Ewing Oil in 1991. Bobby took over Pam's shares in Wentworth Industries following her car accident and subsequent disappearance in 1987, and would undoubtedly have given these to Christopher once he became of age.

==== Herbert Wentworth ====
Herbert Wentworth (John L. Martin) was the second husband of Rebecca Barnes Wentworth) and father of Katherine Wentworth (Morgan Brittany). He appeared in one episode of season 4. (John L. Martin also appeared in season 10, episode 26, Return to Camelot Part 2, playing oil well firefighter Pinky Noonan, an allusion to Red Adair, the well-known real life oil well firefighter.)

After leaving husband Digger Barnes (David Wayne/Keenan Wynn) and her children, Cliff (Ken Kercheval) and Pamela (Victoria Principal), Rebecca became secretary to Herbert at his company, Wentworth Tool & Die. They eventually fell in love, married, and started a family of their own. Rebecca never told Herbert about her previous family, and when he died in 1981, Rebecca inherited the entire company.

His death meant that Rebecca, no longer needing to lie to him about her previous life, allowed herself to rebuild a relationship with Cliff and Pam.

==== Afton Cooper ====
Afton Cooper Van Buren (Audrey Landers) was the sister of Mitch Cooper (Leigh McCloskey), and sister-in-law of Lucy Ewing (Charlene Tilton). She appeared regularly between season 4 and season 7, before departing in the season 8 premiere and returning for guests stints in season 12 and season 13. Landers appeared in 84 episodes overall.

Afton was an aspiring singer, later achieving notoriety by gaining a regular spot in a nightclub. She had a brief affair with her sister-in-law's uncle, J.R. (Larry Hagman), before embarking on a long-term relationship with Cliff Barnes (Ken Kercheval). After realising that Cliff was reluctant to make a long-term commitment to her, she left him and became internationally famous as a singer.

At the time she left Cliff, she was pregnant with his child, and gave birth to a daughter some months afterwards, naming her Pamela Rebecca after Cliff's sister and mother, respectively. When she and Cliff met again in 1989, she denied that Cliff was the father. After rekindling their relationship, Cliff did some research and found out that Pamela Rebecca was his daughter' when he went to confront Afton with the discovery, he found that she had discovered his investigation and fled Dallas with the girl. This time, Cliff was especially hurt by her disappearance, as he had fallen in love with Afton and had planned on proposing.

Afton returned in the revival series, visiting Pamela Rebecca in hospital and attending J.R.'s funeral.

==== Katherine Wentworth ====
Katherine Wentworth (Morgan Brittany) was the daughter of Herbert Wentworth (John Martin) and Rebecca Barnes Wentworth, and younger-half sister to Cliff Barnes (Ken Kercheval) and Pamela Barnes Ewing (Victoria Principal). She made sporadic appearances in season 5 and season 6, appeared regularly in season 7 and season 8, and returned briefly in season 11. Brittany appeared in 56 episodes overall.

Katherine was a broadcast journalist in New York City, who discovered her mother's previous family following the death of her father in 1981. She disliked Cliff, but got on well with Pam, and gradually developed an obsession with Pam's husband Bobby Ewing (Patrick Duffy) after misinterpreting his gestures of friendship. Following his divorce from Pam, Katherine hopes they will embark on a relationship, but this is stalled by the return of Bobby's childhood sweetheart Jenna Wade (Priscilla Beaulieu Presley). Believing he will help to break Bobby and Jenna up, Katherine slept with Bobby's brother J.R. (Larry Hagman), although J.R. blackmailed Katherine with a recording of their tryst, saying Bobby would never enter into a relationship with Katherine if he knew she had slept with J.R.. After confessing this to Bobby, he reveals that he never liked Katherine in a sexual way. This, coupled with Pam's discovery that Katherine had tricked her into signing divorce papers when Pam wanted a reconciliation, drove Katherine to psychotic behaviour, and she decided to murder Bobby, firstly shooting him and then attempting to kill him by lethal injection in the hospital. She is caught and arrested, but is released on bail and flees to Europe.

From there, Katherine arranged to have Jenna framed for the murder of her ex-husband Renaldo Marchetta (Daniel Pilon) in order to tear Jenna and Bobby apart. When she returns for Bobby, she is horrified to discover that he and Pam have reconciled. In anger, she tries to run Pam down outside her house, but instead hits Bobby. Katherine is shown to have died in the car after crashing into a gardener's lorry, and Bobby later dies in hospital. The deaths of Bobby and Katherine (and the entirety of season 9) were later shown to be part of a dream Pam was having, meaning that Katherine was still alive and had never returned to Dallas.

After Pam is involved in a serious car explosion, Katherine visits her bedside and confesses her jealousy over Pam's stable life and relationship with Bobby. Bobby catches Katherine visiting, and Katherine makes a final desperate plea for Bobby to love her. He rejects her, and threatens to turn her over to the police if he ever sees her again. Katherine returns to Europe.

In the revival series, it is revealed that Katherine had died, in Europe, between 1988 and 2012.

==== Pamela Rebecca Cooper ====
Pamela Rebecca "Pammy" Barnes (Jenna Pangburn) was the daughter of Cliff Barnes (Ken Kercheval) and Afton Cooper (Audrey Landers), conceived shortly before Afton left Cliff for good. She appeared in two episodes of season 12.

Pamela Rebecca was born in 1985, named for her paternal aunt Pamela Barnes Ewing (Victoria Principal) and grandmother Rebecca Barnes Wentworth (Priscilla Pointer). She was raised by Afton and a series of nannies while Afton toured the world as a lounge singer. Cliff was unaware of her existence until the time Pamela Rebecca was four, and Afton returned to Dallas on tour. Afton didn't want Cliff to be a part of the child's life, and claimed that she was fathered by another man; Cliff, unconvinced, did some investigating and found that Pamela Rebecca was his child. However, when he went to confront Afton with the information, he discovered that Afton had discovered his investigation and fled Dallas, leaving no forwarding address.

Pamela Rebecca - under the name "Rebecca Sutter" - played a bigger role in the revival series, where she marries her adoptive cousin Christopher (Jesse Metcalfe) in order to take down the Ewing empire on behalf of her father.

=== Other ===
Name	Portrayed by	1st episode	Season(s)	Episode count
Julie Grey	Tina Louise	1x01	1–2	5
Secretary to J.R. Ewing who leaked important papers on Sen. "Wild Bill" Orloff to Cliff Barnes and ruined Orloff's career. Returned to town the following year to get revenge on J.R., striking up a close relationship with her former boss, Jock Ewing. Killed by a fall from her apartment building, after being cornered by Jeb Ames and Willie Joe Garr, who knew she was going to give the Ewing Red File to Cliff Barnes.
Connie Brasher	Donna Bullock & Ann Ford & Nancy Bleier & Jeanna Michaels	1x01	1 & 2 & 2 and 2–4	42 (3 & 2 & 5 & 32)
Bobby's first secretary.
Susan	Lisa LeMole	1x05	1–2	4
J.R.'s second secretary.
Liz Craig	Barbara Babcock	2x04	2–5	16
Pam's boss at The Store.
Dr. Harlen Danvers	Dan Ammerman and John Zaremba	2x04	2 & 2–3, 5–10	14 (1 & 13)
The Ewing family physician.
Jeb Ames	Ed Nelson & Sandy Ward	1x01	2 and 2–3	6 (1 & 5)
A ruthless businessman alongside his colleague Willie Joe Garr, who both work as a double act alongside the Cartel. Ames and Garr often do uneasy business with J.R., and they are both anxious to drill on oil rich Southfork land once Jock Ewing passes away. Ames and Garr are later involved in the death of Julie Grey, who was J.R. and Jock's old secretary at Ewing Oil.
Willie Joe Garr	John Ashton	1x01	2–3	6
A ruthless businessman alongside his colleague Jeb Ames, who both work as a double act alongside the Cartel. Ames and Garr often do uneasy business with J.R., and they are both anxious to drill on oil rich Southfork land once Jock Ewing passes away. Ames and Garr are later involved in the death of Julie Grey, who was J.R. and Jock's old secretary at Ewing Oil.
Louella Caraway Lee	Meg Gallagher	2x08	2–4	37
Secretary at Ewing Oil. Spied on Bobby Ewing for J.R. Ewing while Bobby served as president of the company. Slept with J.R. and later fired by him in 1981.
Jordan Lee	Don Starr	2x08	2–14	89
Texas oilman and associate of J.R. Ewing. Longtime cartel member and associate of Cliff Barnes. Slept with Kristin Shepard and was later blackmailed by her. Killed in Paris by Sheila Foley/Hillary Taylor and her thugs.
Wade Luce	Robert Ackerman	2x08	2–6	13
Oilman of Jock Ewing's generation. Cartel member with Seth Stone, Andy Bradley and Jordan Lee.
Marilee Hurst Stone	Fern Fitzgerald	2x15	2–13	73
Sophisticate and shrewd wife of a cartel associate of J.R. Ewing (who committed suicide when he was cheated by J.R.) She is the daughter of the owner of Hurst Oil and a member of the Daughters of the Alamo. She is also a friend of Linda Bradley and Sue Ellen Ewing. She went on to become a successful Texas oil woman and cartel member. She slept with Cliff Barnes and J.R. Ewing.
Detective Harry McSween	James Brown	2x17	2–12	41
Dallas police detective who frequently helps J.R. with legal matters.
Andy Bradley	Paul Sorensen	2x20	2–10	33
A member of the cartel.
Jackie Dugan	Sherril Lynn Rettino	2x23	2–5, 7–14	186
Pam's co-worker at The Store, later Cliff's secretary at Barnes-Wentworth Oil, eventually James's secretary at Ewing Oil.
Muriel Gillis	Karlene Crockett	2x24	2–6	12
Lucy Ewing's best friend.
Alan Beam	Randolph Powell	3x01	3–4	18
Smooth-talking, ambitious lawyer from Chicago who works for J.R. and was briefly engaged to Lucy.
Harv Smithfield	George O. Petrie	3x01	3–14	54
The Ewing family's lawyer.
Vaughn Leland	Dennis Patrick	3x02	3, 5, 7–8	19
A banker, specializing in loans. Initially an executive of the Cattleman's Bank in Dallas, before later joining a bank in Houston.
Dr. Simon Ellby	Jeff Cooper	3x07	3–4	19
Sue Ellen's psychiatrist.
Eugene Bullock	E. J. André	3x14	3–4, 6	6
Elderly international shipping tycoon who frequently transports the Ewings' oil.
Sheriff Fenton Washburn	Barry Corbin	3x15	3, 5–7	9
The Braddock County sheriff.
Serena Wald	Stephanie Blackmore	3x16	3, 5–8, 11, 13	20
A prostitute who is frequently visited by J.R.
Scotty Demarest	Stephen Elliott	3x23	3, 8, 10	14
The Ewing family's criminal attorney.
Franklin Horner	Laurence Haddon	4x03	4–6, 9–10	17
A Cattlemen's Bank executive and J.R. Ewing's banker.
Marvin "Punk" Anderson	Morgan Woodward	4x06	4–11	55
Oil man and longtime friend to Jock and Miss Ellie.
Jeremy Wendell	William Smithers	4x10	4–5, 8–12	50
Head of the powerful WestStar Oil and proverbial thorn in J.R.'s side.
Clint Ogden	Monte Markham	4x12	4	9
Sue Ellen's first love.
Leslie Stewart	Susan Flannery	4x13	4	11
Public relations agent, who worked with Ewing Oil, and secretly taped her conversations with J.R.; also had affairs with J.R. and his political rival.
Phyllis Wapner	Deborah Tranelli	4x13	4–14	147
Bobby's second secretary.
Sylvia "Sly" Lovegren	Deborah Rennard	5x02	5–14	188
J.R.'s fourth and most devoted secretary.
Roger Larson	Dennis Redfield	5x12	5	12
A photographer who became infatuated with Lucy to the extent of building a shrine to her. After they had two one-night stands, Lucy called the relationship off and started avoiding Roger out of fear of his intensity and his growing obsession with her. Roger later kidnapped and raped Lucy, before she was rescued by Bobby and Pam. Lucy later discovered she was pregnant with Roger's child and had an abortion.
Cassie	Anne C. Lucas	5x12	5–10	53
Waitress at the Oil Baron's Club.
Holly Harwood	Lois Chiles	6x01	6–7	25
Oil heiress who becomes involved in a complex scheme with J.R. and causes Sue Ellen to drink again after discovering her affair with J.R. Pursued a romance with Bobby.
Kendall Chapman	Danone Simpson	6x01	6–14	103
Ewing Oil receptionist.
Teresa	Roseanna Christiansen	6x01	6–14	119
Southfork maid. Played by uncredited extras during season 2–5.
Raoul	Charles Escamilla & Tony Garcia & William Marquez	6x01	6 & 7–12 & 14	28 (3 & 22 & 3)
Southfork servant. Played by uncredited extras during season 1–5.
Mavis Anderson	Alice Hirson	6x02	6–7, 10–11	26
Punk's wife and Miss Ellie's best friend.
Frank Crutcher	Dale Robertson	6x04	6	5
A man Ellie befriended after Jock's death.
Thornton McLeish	Kenneth Kimmins	6x05	6–7	11
A Canadian business partner of Bobby.
Walt Driscoll	Ben Piazza	6x06	6	11
Former head of the Office of Land Management (OLM). After being blackmailed by J.R. Ewing into giving J.R. a variance to pump out oil at full capacity, Driscoll went on a long holiday to avoid the political fallout, during which the OLM was disbanded and replaced with the Texas Energy Commission (TEC). Driscoll later reemerged as a shipping tycoon involved in the illegal shipping of oil to Cuba, a scheme which J.R. went on to join. After the biggest shipment of oil to Cuba was thwarted by Bobby and Ray, a disastrous chain of events followed, resulting in Driscoll committing suicide after a failed attempt to kill J.R. instead resulted in the paralysis from the neck down of Mickey Trotter.
Mark Graison	John Beck	6x14	6–7, 9	67
Pamela's boyfriend/fiancé after her first divorce from Bobby, whom Pam vows to marry due to his contraction of a rare type of leukemia which leaves him with months to live. Before Mark can die from the leukemia, he apparently commits suicide via a plane crash. Mark returned during the dream season after Bobby's "death", claiming to have faked his own death in the plane crash in order to enter clinics in a bid to find a cure for his leukemia. He claimed that while he didn't find a cure for his leukemia, he was in remission. He also got engaged to Pam again and married her in the last episode of the dream season. Also in Season 9, J.R. had discovered that while in university, Mark was involved in a fraternity hazing incident that resulted in the accidental death of a student. Mark's father intervened and prevented Mark from being criminally charged for his involvement. Both storylines, however, were later abandoned as if they had never happened, when the whole of season 9 was explained away as being Pam's dream. His wedding to Pam gave his name as "Mark Thomas Graison".
Louise	Mary Armstrong	6x19	6–8	17
Pamela's nanny for Christopher while separated from Bobby.
Doris	Delores Cantú	6x26	6–7, 9	3
Relief receptionist at Ewing Oil.
Peter Richards	Christopher Atkins	7x03	7	27
Twenty-year-old lover of Sue Ellen and mentor to little John Ross. He was forced to move to New York by J.R. after he rekindled his sexual relationship with Sue Ellen.
Paul Morgan	Glenn Corbett	7x04	7, 9–11	18
A hot shot attorney, representing the Ewings in some of their most difficult legal cases.
Edgar Randolph	Martin E. Brooks	7x12	7–8	10
Government official blackmailed by J.R. until he suffers a mental breakdown.
Dora Mae	Pat Colbert	7x12	7–14	70
Hostess at the Oil Baron's Club.
Angela	Marina Rice	7x12	7–8, 10	12
Pam's maid while separated from Bobby.
Dr. Jerry Kenderson	Barry Jenner	7x17	7–9	25
College friend of Mark Graison and the doctor who treats him for his blood condition.
Leo Wakefield	Bill Morey	7x17	7–8, 11	11
An important stock controller of Barnes-Wentworth Oil
Mandy Winger	Deborah Shelton	8x03	8–10	63
A model, initially the girlfriend of Cliff Barnes following Cliff's split from Afton Cooper. After splitting from Cliff, Mandy went on to become one of the most famous mistresses of J.R. Ewing, becoming one of a small number of mistresses to get into J.R.'s heart. She later became an actress.
Betty	Kathleen York	8x04	8	10
Eddie Cronin's girlfriend, who worked as a waitress at The Hot Biscuit diner with Lucy Ewing, developing a feud with Lucy over Eddie.
Eddie Cronin	Fredric Lehne	8x05	8	19
Started an affair with Lucy Ewing and got involved in a construction business with Lucy, while continuing to have a relationship with his girlfriend Betty behind Lucy's back.
Angelica Nero	Barbara Carrera	9x07	9	25
Beautiful, exotic business associate to J.R. Ewing, trying to get J.R. and Jack involved in a deal with Marinos Shipping so that she could kill them off in the public eye, which would result in Angelica taking over as the head of Marinos Shipping from the dying/dead Dimitri Marinos, who had an uncanny resemblance to Jack Ewing. (dream season only)
Grace Van Owen	Merete Van Kamp	9x08	9	17
Angelica Nero's right-hand woman in Angelica's plot to take over Marinos Shipping. During the latter part of the mission, Grace fell in love with Jack Ewing and she gave Jack and J.R. forewarning of Angelica's intentions. Grace later stopped Angelica from shooting dead J.R. and Jack. Grace was later killed by Angelica while still on the island of Martinique. (dream season only)
Nicholas	George Chakiris	9x11	9	11
Angelica Nero's assistant in Angelica's plot to take over Marinos Shipping, Nicholas turned informant against Angelica to attain his freedom, but was later killed by Angelica in a Zurich hotel room. (dream season only)
Matt Cantrell	Marc Singer	9x15	9	12
An old friend of Bobby's who continues to search for emerald mines in South America, arriving in Dallas just to find out that Bobby is dead. Pam takes over in investing in Matt's emerald mine (dream season only)
Alex Garrett	William Prince	9x21	9	5
An old acquaintance of Dimitri Marinos and Angelica Nero. (dream season only)
Ben Stivers	Steve Forrest	9x29	9	3
A man who came to work on Southfork Ranch, giving Miss Ellie and Punk Anderson the feeling that they had met him before. (dream season only)
Wes Parmalee	Steve Forrest	10x02	10	12
A man who came to work on Southfork Ranch. When Miss Ellie discovered Jock Ewing's possessions in his room, Wes claimed that they had always been his possessions and that he was Jock. Jock had been declared legally dead for several years at the time.
Oswald Valentine	Derek McGrath	10x03	10–11	15
Rather eccentric partner of Sue Ellen, in the lingerie business.
B.D. Calhoun	Hunter von Leer	10x06	10	10
Crazed mercenary, hired for $1,000,000 by J.R. for a job of blowing up Saudi oil fields, in order to force up the market price of oil in the USA. When a CIA agent informs J.R. of their close tracking of Calhoun and his terrorist activities, J.R. calls Calhoun to try to call off their deal, but Calhoun refuses. J.R. then decides to do a deal with the CIA to foil Calhoun's Saudi activities. Calhoun is enraged and comes after J.R. with a vengeance. Calhoun is eventually shot dead by Bobby and Ray in California.
Bruce Harvey	Jonathan Goldsmith	10x10	10, 12	16
A Hollywood producer, helping Sue Ellen and Don Lockwood to produce their movie about J.R.
Nicholas Pearce	Jack Scalia	11x02	11, 14	29
Stockbroker who becomes infatuated with Sue Ellen. He was thrown off a balcony by J.R.
Harrison "Dandy" Dandridge	Bert Remsen	11x02	11	10
Drunk befriended by Cliff.
Carswell "Casey" Denault Jr.	Andrew Stevens	11x03	11–12	33
Oil business understudy from Oklahoma who was in league with J.R. and wooed his secretary Sly. Also wooed Lucy in an attempt to get to her money; and wooed Marilee Stone for J.R. Ewing.
Kimberly Cryder	Leigh Taylor-Young	11x09	11–12	20
Beautiful young wife of an influential Texas oilman. Had an affair with J.R.
Kelly	Kehly Sloane	11x12	11–12	19
Sue Ellen's secretary.
Dr. Herbert Styles	John Anderson	11x14	11	7
Kimberly Cryder's father and a major stockholder in Westar.
Laurel Ellis	Annabel Schofield	11x15	11	11
A young woman Miss Ellie suspects is having an affair Clayton.
Kay Lloyd	Karen Kopins	11x20	11, 13	12
A PR agent who is Bobby's first love interest after losing Pam.
Debbie	Deborah Marie Taylor	11x23	11–14	37
Waitress at the Oil Baron's Club.
Rose Daniels McKay	Jeri Gaile	12x03	12–14	20
Carter McKay's young wife who is manipulated into having an affair with Cliff Barnes.
Tracey Lawton	Beth Toussaint	12x05	12–13	17
Carter McKay's daughter who becomes involved with Bobby.
Detective Ratagan	John Hoge	12x09	12–14	14
A dirty cop who replaces McSween as J.R.'s contact within the police force.
Tommy McKay	J. Eddie Peck	12x14	12–13	13
Carter McKay's son, a drug dealer.
Hillary Taylor	Susan Lucci	14x01	14	6
Psychotic kidnapper who causes April's death at April's and Bobby's honeymoon in Paris.
LeeAnn De La Vega	Barbara Eden	14x08	14	5
South American entrepreneur and a woman from J.R.'s past who came back for revenge. Daughter of a Baptist schoolteacher. Met J.R. at the University of Texas, became involved with him, and was unable to have children because of the "botched abortion" she had when he abandoned her. Inherited her husband's company in 1983. Based in Venezuela before coming to Dallas after meeting Michelle Stevens at a resort in the Bahamas and learning what J.R. was doing after all these years.
