= Dallas season 5 =

Dallas
- Season 5
- DVD cover
- No. of episodes: 26

Release
- Original network: CBS
- Original release: October 9, 1981 – April 9, 1982

Season chronology
- ← Previous; Season 4 Next → Season 6

The fifth season of the television series Dallas aired on CBS during the 1981–82 TV season.

== Cast ==
=== Starring ===
In alphabetical order:

- Barbara Bel Geddes as Miss Ellie Ewing (24 episodes)
- Patrick Duffy as Bobby Ewing (26 episodes)
- Linda Gray as Sue Ellen Ewing (26 episodes)
- Larry Hagman as J. R. Ewing (26 episodes)
- Susan Howard as Donna Culver Krebbs (26 episodes)
- Steve Kanaly as Ray Krebbs (26 episodes)
- Ken Kercheval as Cliff Barnes (24 episodes)
- Victoria Principal as Pamela Barnes Ewing (26 episodes)
- Charlene Tilton as Lucy Ewing Cooper (24 episodes)

=== Also starring ===
- Leigh McCloskey as Mitch Cooper (19 episodes)
- Jared Martin as Steven "Dusty" Farlow (10 episodes)

=== Special guest stars ===
- Howard Keel as Clayton Farlow (21 episodes)
- Priscilla Pointer as Rebecca Barnes Wentworth (19 episodes)
- Audrey Landers as Afton Cooper (17 episodes)
- Barry Nelson as Arthur Elrod (3 episodes)
- William Smithers as Jeremy Wendell (1 episode)
- Mary Crosby as Kristin Shepard Farraday (1 episode )

=== Notable guest stars ===
Barry Corbin (Sheriff Fenton Washburn) returns for two episodes. Among the new additions to the cast are Deborah Rennard (Sly Lovegren), Morgan Brittany (Katherine Wentworth), Ray Wise (Blair Sullivan), Phyllis Flax (Mrs. Chambers) and Anne C. Lucas (Cassie, a waitress at the Oil Barons Club), who will continue to appear beyond the season. Dennis Redfield (Roger Larson), Art Hindle (Jeff Farraday) and Gretchen Wyler (Dr. Dagmara Conrad), all appear frequently during the season, but won't return for subsequent years. Knots Landing's Ted Shackelford and Joan Van Ark appear in two and one episodes, respectively. Also: future series star Barbara Stock, who will portray Liz Adams for the series' final two seasons, appears in two episodes as Heather Wilson.

== Crew ==
The season's episode writers include showrunner Leonard Katzman, the returning Arthur Bernard Lewis, Linda B. Elstad, Howard Lakin, David Paulsen, and new additions Will Lorin and Bruce Shelly. Philip Capice serves as executive producer, Katzman as producer, and Cliff Fenneman as associate producer. Writer Arthur Bernard Lewis is billed supervising producer, after having served as executive story editor since season two. Linda B. Elstad, who has written episodes since the third season, serves as story editor.

== DVD release ==
Dallas' fifth season was released by Warner Bros. Home Video, on a Region 1 DVD box set of five double-sided DVDs, on August 1, 2006. In addition to the 26 episodes, it also includes the featurette "A Living Landmark, A Tour of the Real Southfork Ranch".

== Episodes ==
No. overall	No. in season	Title	Directed by	Written by	Original U.S. air date	Original U.K. air date	Prod. code	Rating/share (households)
78	1	"Missing Heir"	Irving J. Moore	Arthur Bernard Lewis	October 9, 1981	October 18, 1981	189301	31.9/52
The identity of the dead woman floating in the pool is revealed to be Kristin. The police question Cliff and J.R. who accuse each other of murdering Kristin: Cliff says he figures J.R. pushed her over the balcony into the pool; J.R. says he walked out on to the balcony and saw Cliff trying to drown her. J.R. reveals to Bobby that Pam took John Ross to Abilene and gave him to Sue Ellen. Sue Ellen is now living with Dusty and his father Clayton on the Southern Cross Ranch with John Ross. Sheriff Washburn tells J.R. that the Dallas ADA has told him about the deal that was cut when Kristin admitted to shooting him and he figures that J.R. had the best motive for wanting Kristin dead.
79	2	"Gone, But Not Forgotten"	Leonard Katzman	Arthur Bernard Lewis	October 16, 1981	October 25, 1981	189302	28.4/46
J.R. and Cliff testify at the inquest of Kristin's death. A grieving Sue Ellen takes action to put an end to her marriage. Pam becomes increasingly depressed at the fact she is childless and begins to regret taking John Ross to Sue Ellen. J.R.'s henchmen attempt to grab John Ross away from Sue Ellen at the airport. Luckily, Dusty foresaw this and his ranch hands apprehend J.R.'s men.
80	3	"Showdown at San Angelo"	Irving J. Moore	Leonard Katzman	October 23, 1981	November 1, 1981	189303	26.1/42
Sue Ellen has misgivings about building a new life with Dusty. J.R. uses Miss Ellie to gain access to the Southern Cross Ranch and his son. Ellie and Clayton meet for the first time and agree that while they're on opposite sides of the John Ross debate, the fight is not theirs. Sue Ellen denies J.R.'s offer of a quick, painless divorce in exchange for John Ross. J.R. attempts to lure John Ross away from the Southern Cross Ranch and on to the Southfork helicopter with the help of Miss Ellie, but she refuses to be part of it and gives the boy back to Sue Ellen.
81	4	"Little Boy Lost"	Leonard Katzman	Leonard Katzman	October 30, 1981	November 8, 1981	189304	24.9/41
As they prepare to do battle for temporary custody of John Ross, J.R. plans a scheme to undermine Sue Ellen's chances. Ellie warns J.R. against any mud-slinging against Sue Ellen and personally attends the hearing to ensure it doesn't happen. J.R.'s lawyer tells the judge that Sue Ellen's been providing an unfit environment for John Ross by living in sin with Dusty at the Southern Cross. Sue Ellen’s lawyer then tells the court that Dusty is impotent, which shows Sue Ellen is showing her son the purest of emotions. Faced with this, the judge has no choice but to award custody to Sue Ellen. Pam disappears from her work.
82	5	"The Sweet Smell of Revenge"	Irving J. Moore	Linda B. Elstad	November 6, 1981	November 15, 1981	189305	27.4/45
J.R. tells Jock that he has a new plan: he'll get the Farlows to throw Sue Ellen off the Southern Cross by blocking all of the oil shipments to their refineries. J.R. manages to get three of Clayton's suppliers to agree to his plan. Bobby gets the police to search for Pam. They find her on top of a tall building preparing to jump. Bobby quickly arrives at the scene and heads up to get her. He manages to grab her just in time and she is taken to hospital. Bobby receives a letter with a picture of Kristin and her baby. He is contacted by the sender who says he has more information for sale, if Bobby wants it.
83	6	"The Big Shut Down"	Leonard Katzman	Arthur Bernard Lewis	November 13, 1981	November 22, 1981	189306	29.1/50
Clayton refuses to give in to J.R.'s demands. Bobby makes arrangements to buy more information regarding the identify of the father of Kristin's baby. Pam tells Bobby that she's afraid he'll leave her for someone who can give him a family, but Bobby assures her that it will never happen. Farraday tells Bobby that he was Kristin's lover and companion in California, and that he knows where the baby is. In exchange for Bobby's cash, Farraday gives him a birth certificate and copies of the checks Kristin received in California. Bobby examines the information and finds that the checks came from Jordan Lee. Pam meets her half sister Katherine for the first time. Dusty tells Clayton he just found out that the refineries have stopped receiving oil and Clayton starts to investigate why.
84	7	"Blocked"	Irving J. Moore	Arthur Bernard Lewis	November 20, 1981	November 29, 1981	189307	29.4/51
Bobby talks to Jordan, who hesitantly admits having an affair with Kristin. However, Jordan shows Bobby the results of a blood test confirming that he couldn't be the father of Kristin's baby. Jock calls from South America and J.R. assures him that the plan is going perfectly and that John Ross will be back at Southfork when he arrives home. J.R. tells Clayton he'll sell Clayton back all of his oil as soon as he throws Sue Ellen and John Ross off the Southern Cross. Clayton refuses the offer because Sue Ellen means so much to Dusty. He then tells J.R. that the price of crude dropped heavily that morning by one dollar a barrel so far and was likely to drop further. There might not be a Ewing Oil when Jock returns.
85	8	"The Split"	Leonard Katzman	Leonard Katzman	November 27, 1981	December 6, 1981	189308	28.8/50
Ellie receives a shocking legal document from Jock which affects the future of Ewing Oil. J.R. has a confrontation with Dusty at the Cotton Bowl stadium. Lucy returns from Houston. With the family gathered, Ellie reads Jock's message which refers to a legal document dividing the voting shares of the company: Ellie gets 30, J.R. gets 20, Bobby gets 20, Gary gets 10, Ray gets 10 and John Ross gets 10. Ellie controls John Ross's shares while he is away from Southfork, J.R. gets them if he is on the ranch. Against Valene's wishes, Gary arranges to return to Southfork.
86	9	"Five Dollars a Barrel"	Irving J. Moore	Leonard Katzman	December 4, 1981	December 13, 1981	189309	27.0/44
J.R. is forced to Cliff's demands for Ewing property after Cliff buys the bank notes on J.R.'s $200 million loan and threatens foreclosure. J.R. plots unsuccessfully to acquire the voting shares belonging to Ray and Gary. Pam is allowed to leave the hospital for a brief visit to Southfork.
87	10	"Starting Over"	Leonard Katzman	Leonard Katzman	December 11, 1981	December 20, 1981	189310	28.5/45
Miss Ellie wants to help Ray out of his financial problem and uncovers J.R.'s scheme in the process. J.R. consults a broker in New York about selling Ewing stock. Sue Ellen says goodbye to Dusty. Bobby buys Kristin's baby thinking J.R. is the father. Ellie tells Donna what happened at the bank. As they pull out of the driveway in Donna's car, J.R. arrives at the ranch. Ellie gets out of the car to confront him, ruining Bobby's plan. She follows him inside and they start arguing about what he's done. Bobby arrives home with Christopher. As he stands in the hallway listening to J.R. and Ellie argue, Pam comes down the stairs, overjoyed to mistakenly find that Bobby finally managed to obtain a child they can adopt.
88	11	"Waterloo at Southfork"	Irving J. Moore	Linda B. Elstad	December 18, 1981	December 25, 1981	189311	27.4/46
J.R.'s position at Ewing Oil hangs in the balance when Miss Ellie takes matters into her own hands. An angry, determined Ellie calls the family together to vote on whether J.R. should be removed as the company's president when it looks like he will be forced to default on his loan. J.R. plots to gain custody of his son now that Sue Ellen has left the protection of the Farlow family. Bobby becomes aware of the difficulties he and Pam have ahead of them in adopting Kristin's child without Pam learning of his parentage. Ray has no choice but to pull out of the townhouse development deal, leaving Donna angered by his refusal to confide in her.
89	12	"Barbecue Two"	Leonard Katzman	Arthur Bernard Lewis	January 1, 1982	January 2, 1982	189312	29.3/44
Miss Ellie plans the annual Ewing barbecue to coincide with Jock's expected return to Southfork. J.R. and Sue Ellen find a renewed interest in each other. Cliff realizes that he may still love Sue Ellen. Lucy is annoyed when Mitch is called away by a patient. Ray gets drunk and embarrasses Donna. Clayton and Rebecca re-new their old friendship. Katherine gets attracted to Bobby. Miss Ellie's festive mood is ruined by a shocking phone call: Jock is dead.
90	13	"The Search"	Irving J. Moore	Arthur Bernard Lewis	January 8, 1982	January 9, 1982	189313	32.1/49
The Ewings are unable to accept the fact that Jock could be dead and reminisce about Jock and J.R., Bobby and Ray fly to South America to see the crash site and determine his fate. In South America, the Ewing sons find an injured man at a plane crash site who tells them the small plane he was flying in collided with a helicopter which crashed into a lake at the other side of a hill. At Southfork the Ewing women talk about Jock. Ray and Bobby dive into the lake and find pieces of a helicopter and evidence that their father was a passenger. It is J.R. who has the most trouble accepting the reality of his father's mortality.
91	14	"Denial"	Victor French	Linda B. Elstad	January 15, 1982	January 16, 1982	189314	31.1/47
Jock's death has a devastating effect on J.R., and Bobby has to cover for himself as well as his brother in running Ewing Oil. J.R. is unable to deal with even the simplest of business demands in his grief. In the meantime, the rest of the family is puzzled at Miss Ellie's calmness in dealing with her husband's death and Bobby realizes that she is refusing to accept its reality. Cliff, ecstatic at his victory over J.R., tries to renew his relationship with Sue Ellen, who is having trouble coping with her new single life. Ray and Donna's marriage begins to fall apart with Donna's continued success as a writer and Ray's increasing depression over being a failure. A drunken J.R. terrifies Sue Ellen by demanding Jock's only grandson be returned to Southfork.
92	15	"Head of the Family"	Patrick Duffy	Howard Lakin	January 22, 1982	January 23, 1982	189315	31.1/48
J.R.'s continued absence from the business and Ray's apathy toward running the ranch has Bobby busy trying to keep Ewing Oil afloat and Southfork running smoothly. Bobby asks Miss Ellie for the authority he needs to run Ewing Oil until J.R. recovers from Jock's death, but Ellie knows Bobby has all the pressures he can handle with Pam and the baby. J.R. recovers his sense of purpose when Bobby shows him that they are in danger of losing all that Jock had built up for his family. Sue Ellen and Clayton are targets of criticism because of their friendship, so Sue Ellen welcomes Cliff's attentions. While visiting Southfork with J.R., John Ross pleases him by taking his place in Jock's chair.
93	16	"The Phoenix"	Harry Harris	David Paulsen	January 29, 1982	January 30, 1982	189316	28.4/44
J.R. shows his old spirit at Ewing Oil and uses Marilee Stone in an effort to regain his standing with the cartel, vowing to make the company even stronger. Sue Ellen isn't at all pleased when J.R. takes their son to the office to show him his future, even though she is having her own troubles keeping a balance between Cliff and Clayton in her life. Ray's continued negligence at Southfork leads to confrontations with Bobby, Miss Ellie and his marriage. Cliff gets a singing job for Afton at a posh night club, but her pursuit of him makes her aware of his interest in Sue Ellen. J.R. discovers that Jock had left Ewing Oil divided among all the Ewing heirs so he shocks the family by agreeing with his mother to postpone the reading of the will. Rebecca becomes aware that Katherine is attracted to Bobby. Roger starts following Lucy.
94	17	"My Father, My Son"	Larry Hagman	Will Lorin	February 5, 1982	February 6, 1982	189317	28.4/42
J.R.'s joy at his latest cartel deal is overshadowed by his distress at Sue Ellen's friendship with Cliff, especially after he discovers the two have spent the night in Sue Ellen's apartment. His concern with Sue Ellen's involvement with Cliff prompts J.R. to set a plan in motion to break his rival, even attempting to turn Afton against him. Lucy discovers that Mitch is seeing a woman patient socially and turns to Roger for solace. Bobby tries to talk Pam into going back to work while he tries to hurry the adoption of Christopher. J.R. tries to convince Donna that she could save her marriage by having Ray give up his shares of Ewing Oil, cutting his ties with the Ewings.
95	18	"Anniversary"	Joseph Manduke	David Paulsen	February 12, 1982	February 13, 1982	189318	27.5/44
J.R. pushes his campaign to win Sue Ellen back, and at the same time is busy with plots against Ray and Cliff. After J.R. surprises Sue Ellen by observing the anniversary of their first meeting, Clayton cautions her against believing that J.R. could be changing for the better. Bobby surprises Pam with the gift of her own business, one that will enable her to work and be with their son at the same time. J.R. manipulates Donna into discovering her husband at a motel with an old girlfriend in order to persuade Ray to leave Southfork and turn his shares of Ewing Oil over to him. Roger's obsession with Lucy becomes more intense and is given impetus when Lucy comes to him after being told that Mitch has spent the night with Evelyn Michaelson.
96	19	"Adoption"	Larry Hagman	Howard Lakin	February 19, 1982	February 20, 1982	189319	29.9/48
J.R. continues to shower Sue Ellen with attention and she accepts his invitation to dinner at Southfork. The family is delighted to see Sue Ellen back at the ranch, although she is becoming aware of how sick her relationship with her former husband really is. J.R. has Ray arrested and is then able to persuade him to sign over his voting shares. Bobby and Pam are delighted at the results of the adoption hearing for Christopher. Ray and Donna discuss divorce. Lucy tries to reason with Roger, but his reaction indicates how obsessed he has become with her. Cliff discovers J.R.'s plot to get him out of Dallas and, in a confrontation, tells J.R. that he intends to marry Sue Ellen.
97	20	"The Maelstrom"	Patrick Duffy	Will Lorin	February 26, 1982	February 27, 1982	189320	30.0/49
The Ewing family celebrate the successful adoption of Christopher, but J.R. becomes suspicious and determined to find out what became of Kristin's child. He realizes that he may be a long way from getting his own son back because of Sue Ellen's anger. Ray surprises Miss Ellie and Donna with a complete turnaround from his recent behavior. Mitch asks Lucy for a divorce and she runs to Roger, flattered at his obsession and oblivious to its strange manifestations. J.R. vows to destroy Cliff. Clayton warns Sue Ellen not to turn to Cliff just to get back at J.R..
98	21	"The Prodigal"	Michael Preece	David Paulsen	March 5, 1982	March 6, 1982	189321	28.4/46
J.R. hits a new scheme to use against Cliff from a chance remark by Katherine, and sets up a plan with Marilee Stone to ruin him. In high spirits because he was able to thwart J.R.'s previous efforts to con him, Cliff is able to talk Rebecca into expanding his role at Wentworth Tool and Die; even though Katherine is very upset at this latest grab for power by her half-brother. Sue Ellen is the focus of attention because Cliff presses his courtship, much to the distress of Afton, J.R. and Clayton. Bobby meets with Farraday who tries to blackmail him. Pam warns Roger to stay away from Lucy or face the wrath of the Ewing clan. Donna discovers some disturbing facts about Jock while researching her book and turns to a reformed Ray for advice. J.R. investigates Christopher's birth, with the hope of getting a club to hold over Bobby.
99	22	"Vengeance"	Irving J. Moore	Howard Lakin	March 12, 1982	March 13, 1982	189322	27.0/44
Marilee springs J.R.'s trap on Cliff whose greed compels him to take $4,000,000 from his mother's company to invest in the scheme dangled in front of him. J.R.'s plan for revenge is largely motivated to thwart Cliff's romance with Sue Ellen. Afton tells J.R. his real rival is Clayton. Lucy leaves Southfork for a few days, hoping to resume her life with Mitch. Instead, she runs into a belligerent Roger. Bobby meets with Farraday and concedes to his blackmail with the promise that he leaves the country. Ray suggests that Donna goes to Miss Ellie with the information she has uncovered about Jock's early career. J.R. believes he has the means of forcing Bobby to turn over his shares of Ewing Oil after he sees Christopher's adoption papers.
100	23	"Blackmail"	Michael Preece	Leonard Katzman	March 19, 1982	March 20, 1982	189323	26.9/44
Bobby's worst fears are realised when Farraday is murdered; but a much worse blackmailer takes his place: J.R.. With copies of Christopher's adoption records in his possession, J.R. realizes that he is probably the real father to Christopher and now he can force Bobby to do his will so that Pam will never find out. J.R. also believes he will soon have a clear field to get Sue Ellen back, with Clayton leaving town and Cliff well on the road to ruin. Lucy fails to return to Southfork and the police are called in to find her. Donna faces Miss Ellie with her findings on Jock's early career and a deep rift is created between the two women. The police want to know about Bobby's acquaintance with Farraday.
101	24	"The Investigation"	Irving J. Moore	Bruce Shelly	March 26, 1982	March 27, 1982	189324	28.0/48
Bobby is in a difficult position when he is questioned by police about the extent of his involvement with Farraday. The family call Valene in California about Lucy. Cliff realizes he is facing ruin and tries to borrow money from Sue Ellen, which J.R. uses to try to win Sue Ellen back. Donna is distressed at Miss Ellie's continued coolness over Jock's death. Pam remembers Lucy's concern about Roger and goes to his apartment with Bobby, where they rescue her. Bobby is contacted by underworld figures.
102	25	"Acceptance"	Michael Preece	Will Lorin	April 2, 1982	April 3, 1982	189325	29.1/48
J.R. is riding high with Cliff crushed, Bobby on the ropes, Clayton out of the way and Sue Ellen accepting his attention. Cliff despairs after his mother asks him to resign from Wentworth Tool and Die because of his misuse of funds. Afton declares her love for Cliff and tries to convince him that, together, they can beat J.R.. At the same time, J.R.'s discovery of Christopher's birth has Bobby intimidated, even as Bobby undergoes the ordeal of the investigation into Farraday's underworld connections. Ray intercedes in Donna and Miss Ellie's feud and is instrumental in getting Ellie to face the reality of Jock's death. Mitch decides to leave Dallas and Lucy. A smug J.R. takes Sue Ellen to Southfork for a visit.
103	26	"Goodbye, Cliff Barnes"	Irving J. Moore	Arthur Bernard Lewis	April 9, 1982	April 10, 1982	189326	27.9/46
Cliff uses his strongest weapon against J.R., after J.R. is the apparent winner of their rivalry. Sue Ellen accepts J.R.'s offer of marriage, leaving a disappointed Clayton holding an unused engagement ring and Cliff more despondent than ever. Bobby and Pam find new evidence about Christopher's birth, making Bobby furious at J.R. for using the child as a pawn in his efforts to control Ewing Oil. Lucy resists pressing rape charges against Roger, but agrees to a pregnancy test. The celebration at Southfork over J.R. and Sue Ellen's reconciliation is spoiled by news of Cliff's suicide attempt. Rebecca threatens to use her wealth to break the entire Ewing clan. Miss Ellie blames J.R. for the escalation of the Barnes-Ewing feud and vows to remove him from the presidency of Ewing Oil. Sue Ellen blames herself for Cliff's suicide attempt. She then tells J.R. that she refuses to marry him if Cliff dies.
