= Sarah Cunningham (actress) =

American actress (1918–1986)

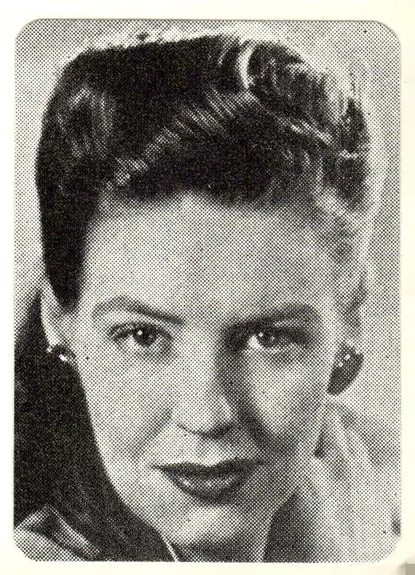
- Publicity photo
- Born: Sarah Lucie Cunningham; September 8, 1918; Greenville, South Carolina, U.S.
- Died: March 24, 1986 (aged 67); Los Angeles, California, U.S.
- Occupation: Actress
- Years active: 1948–1986
- Spouse: John Randolph (m. 1942)
- Children: 2

Sarah Lucie Cunningham (September 8, 1918 – March 24, 1986) was an American film, stage and television actress.

== Personal life ==
Sarah Lucie Cunningham was born in Greenville, South Carolina. She married actor John Randolph from January 3, 1942. The couple had two children.

On March 24, 1986, Cunningham was attending the 58th Academy Awards when she collapsed from an asthma attack. She was taken to Queen of Angels Hospital, where she died later that evening.

== Career ==
Cunningham met her future husband, John Randolph, at Stella Adler's acting classes when she moved to New York from South Carolina after graduating summa cum laude from Furman University. At the time, Randolph, an experienced actor and favorite student of Adler's, was entrusted with teaching the newer students and Randolph and Cunningham fell in love during that time. They were married in 1942 in Chicago, where he was working in the national touring production of Native Son, directed and produced by Orson Welles.

=== Blacklist ===
Cunningham and her husband were believed to have first been named as having possible Communist ties in 1951, possibly again in 1953, and were called before the House Un-American Activities Committee in 1955 in New York. They, as well as Madeline Lee Gilford, Jack Gilford and others, were victims of the anti-Communist blacklist. Neither was able to work in film, TV or radio until well into the 1960s. Cunningham was hired in 1964 to play Elizabeth 'Aunt Liz' Matthews on the newly created soap opera Another World. She, along with actor John Beal, was fired after just one episode by creator Irna Phillips for no apparent reason. It was assumed to be caused by an advertiser or network pressure to fire anyone who had been or was on the "blacklist". The couple supported themselves and their family by working in the theater until they both were finally able to find work on TV and in films.

=== Ensemble Studio Theatre ===
Randolph and Cunningham were original founding members of the Ensemble Studio Theatre in New York City, together with Artistic Director Curt Dempster and actor Jon Voight, between 1968 and 1972. They subsequently founded the Ensemble Studio Theater West in Los Angeles in 1980. Both branches have become well known for the quality of their productions and their programs for developing playwrights.

=== Later work ===
Although both worked extensively in television and film, their primary love was for the living theater. In 1983 they introduced playwright James G. Richardson's one-act play Eulogy, directed by Heidie Helen Davis. It was a two-character play written especially for them as part of a trilogy of two-character one-acts. They performed it in both New York and Los Angeles and it was the last work they performed together on stage before she died. However, their very last work together was in the Trapper John, M.D. episode "The Curmudgeon", shown on March 18, 1986, a week before she died. In it, she and Randolph play reunited lovers who finally marry.

== List of works ==
=== Filmography ===
- Jagged Edge (1985)
- Frances (1982)
- I Never Promised You a Rose Garden (1977)
- The Cowboys (1972)
- Black Like Me (1964)
- The Naked City (1948)

=== Television ===
- Trapper John, M.D. (1981-1986)
- Dallas as Aunt Maggie Monahan, Digger Barnes' sister (1978, 1980, 1984)
- The Oklahoma City Dolls (1981)
- Belle Starr (1980)
- Vega$ (1979)
- How the West Was Won (1979)
- Lucan (1978)
- The Gathering (1977)
- Nero Wolfe (1977)
- Police Woman (1976)
- Executive Suite (1976)
- Visions (1976)
- F. Scott Fitzgerald in Hollywood (1976)
- Starsky and Hutch (1975)
- The Rookies (1975)
- The Turning Point of Jim Malloy (1975)
- Baretta (1975)
- The Family Kovack (1974)
- House of Evil (1974)
- The Rimers of Eldritch (1974)
- Screaming Skull (1973)
- The Edge of Night (1956)
- Another World (1964)
- Look Up and Live (1954)
- Nash Airflyte Theatre (1951)

=== Theater ===
- My Sweet Charlie (Original, Play) (1966)
- The Zulu and the Zayda (Original, Musical, Comedy) (1965)
- Toys in the Attic (Original, Play, Drama) (understudy) (1960)
- The Visit (Original, Play, Drama) (1958)
- Fair Game (Original, Play, Comedy) (1957)
- The House of Bernarda Alba (Original, Play) (1951)
