= Meg Gallagher =

American actress

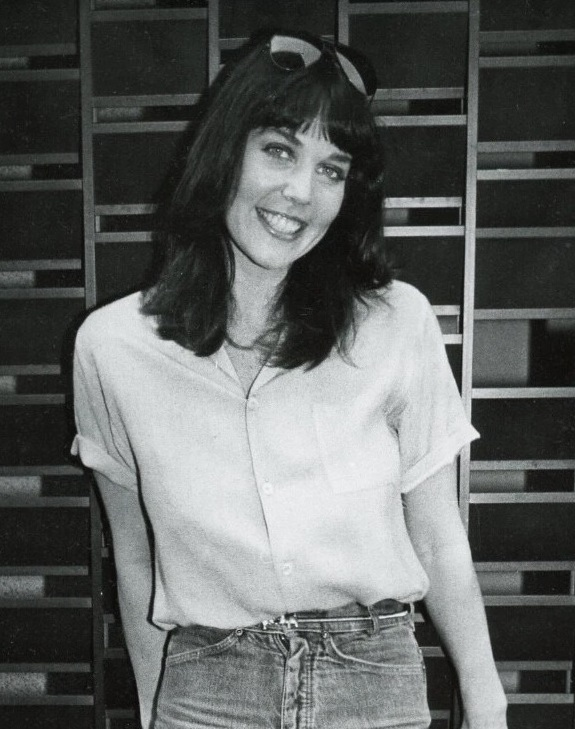
- Gallagher in 1981
- Born: Marcella E. Gallagher; January 23, 1950; Bryn Mawr, Pennsylvania, U.S.
- Died: May 27, 2000 (aged 50); Santa Monica, California
- Occupations: Actor, Model
- Years active: 1970s–1980s
- Children: 1

Marcella E. "Meg" Gallagher (January 23, 1950 – May 27, 2000) was an American actress and model.

== Biography ==
Marcella E. Gallagher was born January 23, 1950, one of fourteen children. She attended Rosemont School of the Holy Child and Pine Manor College in Bryn Mawr, PA before moving to New York City when she was 19. She was best known for her supporting role as Louella Caraway Lee in television hit Dallas where she played the secretary of J.R. Ewing from 1979 until 1981; other than a bit role in a 1979 low-budget exploitation movie, it was her only screen credit.

She died of a chronic liver disease in Santa Monica, California, leaving a three-year-old daughter named Grace.

== Partial filmography ==
- Fyre (1979) – Dawn
- Dallas (1979-1981) – Louella Caraway Lee (final television appearance)
