= April Stevens Ewing =

Fictional character from Dallas TV series

- Dallas character
- Portrayed by: Sheree J. Wilson
- Duration: 1986–91
- First appearance: October 24, 1986; Trompe L'Oeil
- Last appearance: February 1, 1991; Designing Women
In-universe information
- Occupation: Shareholder in Ewing Oil; Shareholder in WestStar Oil Owner of a restaurant.; Owner of April Oil Co.
- Parents: Amy Thompson Stevens
- Siblings: Michelle Stevens
- Spouse: Jack Ewing (divorced); Bobby Ewing (1990)

April Stevens Ewing is a fictional character that appeared in the popular American television series Dallas, played by Sheree J. Wilson from 1986 to 1991.

== Story arc ==
=== Background ===
April Stevens married Jack Ewing (Dack Rambo) and during their divorce hearing the judge granted her to be entitled to 50% of his future income.

=== Storylines ===
April arrives in Dallas to secure her future and informs Jack that she is entitled to half of his ten percent of Ewing Oil. Out of spite, Jack sells his shares to his sister Jamie (Jenilee Harrison) for one dollar and presents April with her half - fifty cents. When Jamie died, her ten percent went to her husband Cliff Barnes (Ken Kercheval). Jack's cousin, J.R. (Larry Hagman) schemes to get the ten percent back into the family and April agrees to help him, along with Jack. Meanwhile, WestStar Oil owner Jeremy Wendell (William Smithers) wishes to obtain the ten percent and makes an offer to April to sell her future shares to him, which she agrees to do. When it goes to court, Jack explains that he sold his shares to Jamie to spite April so she would not benefit from him. The judge orders that April receives her five percent that she was originally entitled to. April then sells her shares to Bobby (double crossing Jeremy and J. R. in the process) and finally becomes a wealthy woman. Jeremy realizes he has been double crossed by April and made to look a fool by J.R., so out for revenge, Jeremy has Ewing Oil and the Ewings investigated by the Justice Department and the company is dissolved.

After Pam Ewing (Victoria Principal) is involved in a horrific car accident, April and Pam's husband Bobby (Patrick Duffy) slowly become closer and start a relationship. Later, April marries Bobby but their union is cut short when she is kidnapped while on honeymoon with Bobby in Paris, where she is subsequently shot and dies in Bobby's arms.
