= Lucy Ewing =

Fictional character in the American television series Dallas

- Dallas character
- Portrayed by: Charlene Tilton
- Duration: 1978–1985, 1988–1990, 2012–2014
- First appearance: April 2, 1978; Digger's Daughter
- Last appearance: March 17, 2014; Lifting the Veil
- Created by: David Jacobs
- Spin-off appearances: Knots Landing
In-universe information
- Occupation: Student at Southern Methodist University (1979–1981). University of Southern California also.; Ward Publications' Young Miss Dallas (1981–1982); Freelance Fashion Model represented by the Blair Sullivan Agency (1982–1983); Waitress at The Hot Biscuit, Fort Worth, Texas (1984); Partner in a construction company (1985); Patron of the Arts (1989–present)
- Parents: Ewing
- Father: Gary Ewing
- Mother: Valene Ewing
- Stepfather: Ben Gibson (1985–87); Danny Waleska (1990)
- Stepmother: Abby Ewing (1983–87)
- Brothers: Bobby Ewing II
- Sisters: Betsy Ewing
- Half-sisters: Molly Whittaker
- Spouse: Mitch Cooper (1981–1982, 1985–1989)
- Grandparents: Jock Ewing; Miss Ellie Ewing; Jeremiah Clements; Lilimae Clements
- Aunts and uncles: J.R. Ewing; Bobby Ewing; Ray Krebbs; Joshua Rush
- First cousins: John Ross Ewing III; James Beaumont; Unnamed male cousin (J.R.'s son with Cally); Unnamed female cousin (J.R.'s daughter with an unknown woman); Christopher Ewing (adoptive); Lucas Krebbs; Margaret Krebbs

Lucy Ann Ewing is a fictional character in the popular American television series Dallas. The character is played by Charlene Tilton and first appeared in the series premiere on April 2, 1978. Tilton left the show at the end of season 8 in 1985, before returning for the last two episodes of season 11 in 1988, becoming a series regular again in season 12. Lucy was then written out again in 1990.

Lucy appeared in one episode of the Dallas spin-off Knots Landing - Season 1, Episode 6: "Home is for Healing" (1980). She returned as a guest star in the continuation of Dallas in 2012.

== Background ==
Lucy is the eldest daughter of Gary Ewing and wife Valene Clements Ewing. She is also the elder sister of twins Bobby and Betsy Ewing (born in 1984, Knots Landing) and half-sister to Molly Whittaker (born in 1993, Knots Landing), though she has never had any onscreen interaction with her siblings. Because her father had a drinking problem, her parents' marriage collapsed. Gary then abandoned Valene at Southfork Ranch while Lucy was still an infant. Valene intended to raise the child by herself but was run out of town by Gary's older brother J.R. Ewing, who then returned Lucy to Southfork Ranch where she was raised by her grandparents, Jock and Miss Ellie Ewing.

== Storylines ==
When the show started, she was the show's teenaged troublemaking, confused vixen and involved with ranch foreman Ray Krebbs, who later turned out to be her uncle. She would skip school and spend her time with him in the hayloft. Eventually, they were caught by her uncle Bobby's young bride, Pam. If Lucy would start going to school, Pamela would not tell anyone about them. However, briefly, Lucy got the upper hand by framing her math tutor for sexual assault. In exchange for clearing him, she wanted Pamela to lie for her and tell her grandparents she was doing well in school. The plan backfired, however, and Lucy was made to finish school.

After Ray decided to end things with Lucy, she fell in love with Kit Mainwaring, a man her own age. They were briefly engaged in 1979, but they ended their relationship after Kit revealed to Lucy that he was gay. When Valene and Gary remarried in the same year and moved to the California suburb of Knots Landing, Lucy went to visit them with the possibility of living with them permanently. However, after spending a week with them in California, Lucy opted to return to Dallas.

Shortly after, Lucy developed and overcame a drug problem. After quitting cold turkey, she developed a relationship with a young attorney named Alan Beam—unbeknownst to Lucy, one of J.R.'s flunkies—in 1979; they became engaged, and the engagement was broken when Lucy realized that she did not love Alan. For a short time after this engagement, she was involved with her married literature professor, Greg Forrester. Lucy married medical student Mitch Cooper in 1981, but their goals in life differed; Mitch was from a poor background, but wanted to become a doctor, while Lucy had no goals. Lucy's wealthy background was a major problem in their marriage, and after a few months of marriage they separated. Lucy started modeling and became involved with psychopath Roger Larsen, her photographer. Roger became obsessed with Lucy and eventually kidnapped her, planning to force her to leave Dallas with him. However, Pam and Bobby rescued her. In quick succession in 1982, Lucy divorced Mitch, but realised she was pregnant with Roger's baby after he had raped her, and she had an abortion.

In the 1982-83 season, following the death of her grandfather Jock, Lucy inherited $5 million. She then became involved with Ray Krebbs' cousin Mickey Trotter, a relationship that ended with Mickey's death. Supposedly, the death was caused only by Sue Ellen's DUI. Actually, Sue Ellen was driving J.R.'s car when Mickey Trotter climbed into the car to try to stop her. The car was intentionally hit by Walt Driscoll, an enemy of J.R.'s who wanted to kill him. After finding out he had caused severe injuries to an innocent young man (Mickey was left paralysed and later became brain-dead), Driscoll committed suicide. Mickey later died when Ray turned off his life-support machine at his mother's request.

Over time, Lucy changed her ways and matured. Mitch and Lucy got back together and remarried in 1985. They then moved to Atlanta. However, their second marriage collapsed due to Mitch's workload as a doctor, and she decided to split up while visiting her family in Dallas in 1988. Lucy and Mitch divorced for the second time in January 1989. In April 1990, Lucy decided to move to Italy.

Lucy is briefly mentioned in the series finale, "Conundrum", where it is revealed that in a life without her scheming and power-hungry uncle J.R., Lucy would never have been born. She is also briefly mentioned in the 1996 television movie Dallas: J.R. Returns, but appears in neither the last episode nor the reunion film.

== Dallas (2012 TV series) ==
Lucy appears as a guest star in the 2012 continuation of Dallas. In 2012, Lucy attends her cousin Christopher's wedding to Rebecca Sutter (also known as Pamela Rebecca Barnes). She also attends Bobby's final family barbecue, which at the time is thought to be the last time they will ever step on Southfork Ranch while it is Ewing-owned. Later, Lucy has lunch with John Ross, who asks her to help him convince her father, Gary Ewing, to sign over his Southfork mineral rights to J.R., but she refuses. In 2013, Lucy attended the funeral of J.R. which is held at Southfork. Later, Lucy shows up at Southfork with her mother, Val, to see her father, Gary (the first time the three of them have appeared onscreen together since Lucy's wedding in 1981). She appeared again in 2014 when she attended the wedding of her cousin John Ross to Pamela Rebecca Barnes.

Lucy's personal life and romantic status are not addressed on the new series.

== In popular culture ==
Lucy was nicknamed "The Poison Dwarf" by Terry Wogan on his BBC Radio 2 show in the 1980s. James Wolcott memorably called her “as short as a tree stump, and not nearly as animated.”
