= Clayton Farlow =

- Dallas character
- Portrayed by: Howard Keel
- Duration: 1981–91
- First appearance: February 20, 1981; Lover, Come Back
- Last appearance: April 19, 1991; Some Leave, Some Get Carried Out
In-universe information
- Occupation: Owner of Farlow Oil; Co-Owner of Saddle Tree Enterprises; Southfork Ranch Co-Owner (1988–91)
- Siblings: Lady Jessica Montford
- Spouse: Amy Wayne Farlow (deceased); Miss Ellie Ewing (1984–99)
- Children: Steven "Dusty" Farlow (legal son)
- Stepchildren: J. R. Ewing; Gary Ewing; Bobby Ewing; Ray Krebbs
- Nieces and nephews: Steven "Dusty" Farlow (biological nephew)

Clayton Farlow is a fictional character in the popular American television series Dallas, played by Howard Keel from 1981 to 1991.

== Background ==
Clayton Farlow, along with his sister Jessica (Alexis Smith), was raised on the Southern Cross Ranch (Co-ordinates: 32°43'N 96°30'W) in San Angelo, Texas. Clayton and Jessica's father was described as a "big man that liked the oil business, but ranching was his real love". Clayton's father took him to his first cattle auction when he was six years old and began teaching him ranching and the oil business. Like his father, Clayton became a successful oilman and rancher. Jessica was wild in her teenage years and developed a serious violent mental condition. She gave birth to a son, Steven "Dusty" Farlow (Jared Martin) in London, England. Clayton and his new wife, Amy, became Steven's legal parents when they listed themselves on Steven's birth certificate, while Jessica married an English lord and remained in England. Clayton and Amy returned to Texas with Steven. Jessica, thinking Amy wanted to replace her as Steven's mother, set the house on fire while Amy was sick in bed - and Clayton was in Galveston on business with his oil refineries. Clayton returned home too late to save Amy. Steven, who was nicknamed Dusty, showed no interest in the oil business or the ranch, choosing instead to become a rodeo star. Steven (Dusty) Farlow met Sue Ellen Ewing at the Ewing Rodeo, and they soon began an affair. When Dusty was on a private flight to Fort Worth to meet Sue Ellen, his plane crashed. He survived and recovered at a home in Denton.

== Storylines ==
Clayton was helping Dusty recover from his plane accident when he first met Sue Ellen Ewing (Linda Gray) and the rest of the Ewing family; Sue Ellen found Dusty after he secretly put up her bail when she was accused of shooting her husband, J.R. (Larry Hagman). Sue Ellen filed for a divorce, taking their son John Ross with her to Southern Cross. When he found out, Jock (Jim Davis) was furious and told J.R. that he wanted John Ross back on Southfork no matter what. After failed attempts to get John Ross back, J.R., with Jock's full support, bought all of the oil that went into Clayton's refineries. J.R. agreed to give it back if Clayton kicked Sue Ellen off the Southern Cross. Clayton refused, but Sue Ellen left on her own, returning to Dallas, and eventually remarried J.R. and moved back to Southfork. The oil was sold back to him by Miss Ellie (Barbara Bel Geddes), and they became friends. During this time, Clayton became romantically attracted to Sue Ellen and defended her against J.R.

Later, after Jock was killed in a helicopter crash in South America, Miss Ellie dated and eventually married Clayton. During his courtship of Miss Ellie, Clayton became very jealous of the life Jock had: having sons carry on his legacy in the oil business, a devoted wife, and a big family with sons, daughters-in-law, and grandchildren.

Shortly before her marriage to Clayton, Miss Ellie was kidnapped by Clayton's mentally unstable sister Jessica, who conspired with J.R. to stop the wedding. Clayton and Miss Ellie honeymooned in Greece, and returned to Southfork, in spite of Clayton's reservations about living in Jock's home and his constant "shadow". To ease his transition, Miss Ellie redecorated Jock and Miss Ellie's bedroom, but Clayton went on business trips to avoid staying at Southfork. Finally, Miss Ellie had J.R. and Bobby (Patrick Duffy) move Jock's portrait from the living room at Southfork to Ewing Oil. Clayton became very good friends with his stepson Bobby and Ray, but remained a self-imposed enemy of eldest stepson J.R., getting into many arguments and fights with him. Clayton has a brief infatuation with a young British model named Laurel Ellis (Annabel Schofield), mirroring Jock's near-affair with his former secretary Julie Grey (Tina Louise), after feeling neglected by Miss Ellie. He also suffered from amnesia and nearly left Miss Ellie until recovering. Clayton sold his refinery businesses to Ewing Oil and at one point began a cutting horse breeding enterprise with Ray.

In 1990, Clayton, unable to live with the shadow of Jock's memory, and Miss Ellie left Southfork to travel extensively. In the final season, he returned to Dallas briefly, without Miss Ellie, to happily convey sole ownership of Southfork to Bobby, much to the objection of J.R.

== Dallas (2012 TV series) ==
In the updated Dallas series, Clayton died after a heart attack in 1999. According to the Dallas Facebook page, he died on March 17, 1999.

== Trivia ==
Clayton appeared in nearly every episode after joining the cast full-time in 1984, after a recurring role during the 1981–82 season (semi-replacing the late Jim Davis as the senior family patriarch), missing 26 episodes altogether (three of these due to Keel's 1986 open-heart surgery) and appearing briefly in the final season.
