= Harris Ryland =

- Dallas character
- Portrayed by: Mitch Pileggi
- Duration: 2012–2014
- First appearance: July 4, 2012; Truth and Consequences
- Last appearance: September 22, 2014; Brave New World
- Created by: David Jacobs
In-universe information
- Occupation: CEO of Ryland Transport
- Mother: Judith Brown Ryland
- Spouse: Ann Smith (198?–92)
- Daughters: Emma Ryland

Harris Ryland is a character in the American television series Dallas, played by Mitch Pileggi. Harris is the son of Judith Brown Ryland (Judith Light) and ex-husband of Ann Ewing (Brenda Strong).

== Casting ==
Mitch Pileggi was cast in the series for a multiple episode arc in 2011. Pileggi was promoted to series regular as of the second season.

He was in the original series for multiple episodes as a character called Morrissey. He had a grudge against the younger J.R. Ewing in a mental institute.

== Character synopsis ==
Harris appeared in the 2012 continuation of the series, and had audiences wondering about his past.

During his premiere episode, Harris is confronted by Ann and is asked to remove the trucks off Southfork to prevent John Ross from drilling. He surprisingly agrees and stops sending trucks to transport oil. In the next episode, Ann receives a letter and a necklace from Harris and breaks down. The next day, Bobby stormed the headquarters in Fort Worth and assaulted Harris. He pressed charges and Bobby was going to be arrested unless he simply apologized to Harris. Sue Ellen visited Harris not long after and got Ryland to send the trucks back to Southfork. Bobby was off the hook after apologizing and Harris blackmailed Sue Ellen. Ann helped her by recording Harris confessions of the blackmail.

He returned in the next season and began to haunt Ann about Emma, their daughter. Emma was poisoned to believe that her mother was evil and irresponsible. In the third episode of Season 2, Ann shoots Ryland. She is accused of attempted murder, a week later. Eventually Ann is put on probation taking into account the torture and hate from the Ryland family. Emma has an attack of conscience after Bobby tells her she is welcome at Southfork Ranch always. Emma decided to stay with the Ewings in Dallas after her grandmother and father's request to send her back to England. Harris and Cliff Barnes team up and fight the Ewings with the governor as an ally. In the end after "J.R.'s Masterpiece", Cliff is arrested and put in jail for the death of J.R. and Harris is arrested for drug trafficking between Texas and Mexico. He is now apparently working for the CIA in an effort to stop the Mendez-Ochoa drug cartel from overthrowing the Mexican government.
