= List of Dallas (2012 TV series) characters =

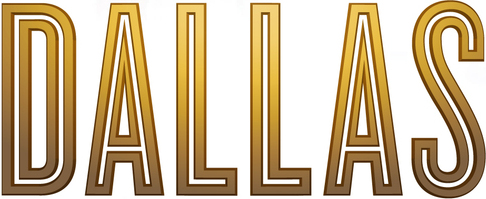

Dallas is a continuation of the 1978–1991 series of the same name which tells the story of two rivalling families, the Ewing family and the Barnes family. The following is a list of characters and cast members who appeared on the show. The time durations below are only assigned to the certain actors.

== Cast timeline ==
Character	Actor	Seasons		
Character	Actor	1	2	3
Main cast members
Christopher Ewing	Jesse Metcalfe	Main	Main	Main
John Ross Ewing III	Josh Henderson	Main	Main	Main
Elena Ramos	Jordana Brewster	Main	Main	Main
Pamela Rebecca Barnes	Julie Gonzalo	Main	Main	Main
Ann Ewing	Brenda Strong	Main	Main	Main
Bobby Ewing	Patrick Duffy	Main	Main	Main
Sue Ellen Ewing	Linda Gray	Main	Main	Main
J.R. Ewing	Larry Hagman	Main (Note: Hagman departs in "The Furious and the Fast" (ep. 2.7).)	Main	Archive
Harris Ryland	Mitch Pileggi	Recurring	Main	Main
Emma Brown	Emma Bell		Main	Main
Andreas "Drew" Ramos	Kuno Becker		Main (Note: Becker is added to the opening credits in "Sins of the Father" (ep. 2.3).)	Recurring
Nicolas Treviño	Juan Pablo Di Pace			Main
Returning from Dallas
Ray Krebbs	Steve Kanaly	Guest	Guest	Guest
Lucy Ewing	Charlene Tilton	Recurring	Guest	Guest
Cliff Barnes	Ken Kercheval	Recurring	Recurring	Recurring
Gary Ewing	Ted Shackelford		Recurring	
Cally Harper Ewing	Cathy Podewell		Guest	
Mandy Winger	Deborah Shelton		Guest	
Valene Ewing	Joan Van Ark		Guest	
Afton Cooper	Audrey Landers		Guest	Guest
Dr. David Gordon	Sam Anderson (Note: Dr. Gordon was played by Josef Rainer in the original series.)		Guest	
Tracey McKay	Melinda Clarke (Note: Tracey was played by Beth Toussaint in the original series.)			Guest
Recurring cast members
Sheriff Derrick	Akai Draco	Recurring	Recurring	Recurring
Carmen Ramos	Marlene Forte	Recurring	Recurring	Recurring
Steve "Bum" Jones	Kevin Page	Recurring	Recurring	Recurring
Lou Rosen	Glenn Morshower	Recurring	Recurring	
"Smiling" Frank Ashkani	Faran Tahir	Recurring	Recurring	
Tommy Sutter	Callard Harris	Recurring		
Marta Del Sol	Leonor Varela	Recurring		
Vicente Cano	Carlos Bernard	Recurring	Guest	
Judith Brown-Ryland	Judith Light		Recurring	Recurring
Roy Vickers	Alex Fernandez		Recurring	
Governor Sam McConaughey	Steven Weber		Recurring	
Ken Richards	Lee Majors		Recurring	
Bo McCabe	Donny Boaz		Guest	Recurring
Heather McCabe	AnnaLynne McCord			Recurring
Candace Shaw	Jude Demorest			Recurring
Luis	Antonio Jaramillo			Recurring
Hunter McKay	Fran Kranz			Recurring

Cast notes

== Recurring characters ==
=== Judith Brown-Ryland ===
Judith Brown-Ryland
- Dallas character
- Portrayed by: Judith Light (2013–14)
- Duration: 2013–14
- First appearance: January 28, 2013; Venomous Creatures
- Last appearance: September 22, 2014; Brave New World
- Created by: Cynthia Cidre
In-universe information
- Occupation: Texas Railroad Commissioner; Owner of Ryland Transport
- Sons: Harris Ryland
- Granddaughters: Emma Brown
- Other relatives: Ann Ewing

Judith Ryland (née Brown) is a fictional character from the TNT prime time soap opera Dallas. The role has been portrayed by Tony and Emmy Award winning actress Judith Light. Judith first appeared in episode 2 of the second season.

==== Casting ====
Judith Light was cast in Dallas in a mystery role as "an authoritative and controlling battleaxe who will fight to the death to protect the people she loves" on October 8, 2012. Later it was announced that Light would be playing Judith Brown-Ryland, Harris Ryland's evil mother and Emma Brown's grandmother. Judith Light is only three years older than her screen son Mitch Pileggi. Light was born on February 9, 1949, while Pileggi was born three years later, on April 5, 1952. The Huffington Post called it a candidate for "Worst Casting Ever" in television history.

==== Storylines ====
Judith Brown-Ryland arrives in Dallas with her granddaughter Emma in 2013. She is the manipulative mother of Harris Ryland and ex-mother-in-law of Ann Ewing. She hates Ann and with Harris kidnapped Ann's daughter Emma at 18 months. In her last appearance in Season 2, Harris sent Judith to an asylum after she wanted to replace him as head of Ryland Transportation with Emma.

=== Carmen Ramos ===
Carmen Ramos
- Dallas character
- Portrayed by: Marlene Forte (2012–14)
- Duration: 2012–14
- First appearance: June 13, 2012; Changing of the Guard
- Last appearance: September 22, 2014; Brave New World
- Created by: Cynthia Cidre
In-universe information
- Occupation: Housekeeper for the Ewings.
- Sons: Drew Ramos
- Daughters: Elena Ramos

Carmen Ramos is a fictional character from the TNT prime time soap opera Dallas. The role has been portrayed by actress Marlene Forte as of pilot episode broadcast on June 13, 2012.

==== Casting ====
Marlene Forte was cast as a series regular on April 21, 2011, but was dropped to recurring status after the pilot episode was filmed.

==== Storylines ====
Carmen has worked for the Ewing family for many years. She is the mother of Elena Ramos and Drew Ramos. She is not fond of John Ross Ewing III or his father, J.R., but loves Christopher, Bobby and Ann. Her husband worked for Ewing Oil, and died in a rig accident. She turns against the Ewings when Elena reveals that J.R. had swindled her husband out of a share of land, leading to his death.

=== Steve "Bum" Jones ===
Steve "Bum" Jones
- Dallas character
- Portrayed by: Kevin Page (2012–14)
- Duration: 2012–14
- First appearance: June 13, 2012; Changing of the Guard
- Last appearance: September 22, 2014; Brave New World
- Created by: Cynthia Cidre
In-universe information
- Occupation: Private Investigator for J.R. Ewing

Steve "Bum" Jones is a fictional character from the TNT prime time soap opera Dallas. The role has been portrayed by actor Kevin Page as of season one.

==== Storylines ====
J.R. said that Bum "can be resourceful" and he is said to have a knack for finding people that don't want to be found. J.R. used Bum to spy on Sue Ellen and see whom she was dating. Bum also gathered information on Cliff Barnes's right-hand man Frank Ashkani and also kept J.R. up-to-date on John Ross.

After J.R.'s death, Bum worked for John Ross and later with Bobby, Sue Ellen, and Christopher enacting J.R.'s masterpiece. Bum revealed that J.R., dying from cancer and with only a few days left to live, asked him (Bum) to shoot him so that J.R. could pin his death on longtime rival Cliff Barnes, ending the Barnes-Ewing feud as part of J.R.'s final masterplan. Bum said that J.R.'s final request was the hardest thing he ever had to do but John Ross understood he was only following J.R.'s wishes. In his final letter J.R. said Bum was "the best friend I didn't deserve to have".

=== Other recurring characters ===
- Brett Brock as Clyde Marshall (season 1–3), a private investigator hired by John Ross.
- Akai Draco as Sheriff Derrick (season 1–present), the Braddock County sheriff.
- Steve Kanaly as Ray Krebbs (season 1–3), Jock's illegitimate son and the half-brother of J.R., Bobby and Gary. A main character in the original series until he left for Europe during season 12.
- Ken Kercheval as Cliff Barnes (season 1–3), the long time rival of J.R., as well as the half-brother of Christopher's adoptive mother and Bobby's first wife, Pamela Barnes Ewing. At the end of the original series, Cliff managed to gain control of Ewing Oil and now - wealthier than ever - his ongoing feud with the Ewings in general and J.R. in particular, continues. As shown in the first-season finale, Cliff is behind Rebecca's scheming, as Rebecca's identity as Cliff's daughter is revealed. He was a main character in the original series, appearing throughout its run.
- John McIntosh as Dr. Bennett (season 1–3), Bobby's doctor.
- Glenn Morshower as Lou Rosen (season 1–3), Bobby's new attorney who takes over after Mitch Lobell skips town.
- Charlene Tilton as Lucy Ewing (season 1–3), niece of J.R. and Bobby and the older cousin of John Ross and Christopher. She is the daughter of Gary and Valene Ewing and was a main character in the original series.
- Joan Van Ark as Valene Ewing (season 2), wife of Gary Ewing, mother of Lucy. The character originated on Dallas before moving to Knots Landing.
- Ted Shackelford as Gary Ewing (season 2), Lucy Ewing's father and J.R. and Bobby's brother, the "black sheep" of the family. Gary and Valene were recurring characters in the original series, and later became main characters in the spin-off series Knots Landing.
- Audrey Landers as Afton Cooper Pamela Rebecca Barnes' mother and Cliff's ex-girlfriend.
- Lee Majors as Ken Richards, an old admirer of Sue Ellen's and a commissioner of T.E.S.H.A., a state agency looking into Christopher's rig explosion.
- Steven Weber as Governor Sam McConaughey Joins forces with Cliff Barnes and Harris Ryland to try and take down the Ewings. It was revealed that when Barnes and Ryland joined forces, McConaughey's campaign for governor was aided greatly by Ryland
- AnnaLynne McCord as Heather (season 3), ex-wife of Bo McCabe (played by Don Boaz). Works on Southfork ranch. Love interest of Christopher Ewing.
- Leonor Varela as Veronica Martinez/Marta Del Sol (season 1), a mentally unstable con artist who pretends to be a Mexican heiress. She is involved with J.R. and John Ross's plans to take over Southfork, until they turn on her and she is murdered by Vicente's gang.
- Callard Harris as Tommy Sutter (season 1), Rebecca's supposed older brother, involved in her plot to extort money from Christopher. It is eventually revealed he and Rebecca are not actually brother and sister, but lovers. As Rebecca's feelings for Christopher grow stronger, her and Tommy's relationship begins to crack, until Rebecca kills Tommy in self-defense during a fight.
- Richard Dillard as Mitch Lobell (season 1), the Ewing family attorney. He double crosses Bobby in an agreement with J.R. and John Ross. He then skips town after his crooked dealings are revealed and J.R. turns on him.
- Faran Tahir as Frank Ashkani (season 1–2), Cliff's menacing right-hand man. Born Rahid Durani in Islamabad, he was taken off the streets by Cliff some 30 years ago. Cliff gave him a proper education, eventually hired him as his private driver, and "adopted" him as a son. Marginalized and betrayed by Cliff, Askani began colluding with J.R. Cliff learned of the defection, he set up Ashkani to take the rap for Tommy's murder and convinced him to make a statement at the clearing Rebecca, and to afterwards commit suicide by swallowing a poison pill Cliff gave him. Ashkani made the statement and committed suicide while being arraigned for Tommy Sutter's murder.
- Carlos Bernard as Vicente Cano (season 1–2), a Venezuelan businessman who finances J.R. and John Ross' deal with Veronica. When the Ewings fail to hold up their end of the deal, he turns violent. He eventually is sentenced to prison, after federal agents raid his house. In season 2, he escapes from the supervision of the Venezuelan consul general while awaiting extradition. He holds the Ewings hostage at Southfork to force Christopher to turn over his methane extraction technology, but this attempt fails and he is shot dead by Elena's brother Drew.
- Angelica Celaya as Lucia Treviño (season 3), wife of Nicolas and mother of his sons.
- Emily Kosloski as Rhonda Simmons (seasons 2–3), paid by the Ewings to claim Cliff Barnes was in Nuevo Laredo the night J.R. died.
- Currie Graham as Stanley Babcock (season 3), Railroad Commissioner blackmailed by John Ross to issue a drilling permit for Southfork. Eventually forced to resign.
- Dallas Clark as Michael (season 3), the young son of Bo McCabe and Heather.
- Jonathan Adams as Calvin Hanna (season 3), old friend of Bobby's who Bobby asks to handle the IPO for Ewing Global.
- Gino Anthony Pesi as George Tatangelo (season 3), CIA agent, Harris Ryland's CIA handler.
- Melinda Clarke as Tracey McKay (season 3), Carter McKay's daughter and Bobby's ex-girlfriend, portrayed by Beth Toussaint (and known as Tracey Lawton) in the original series from 1988 to 1989.
- Pej Vahdat as Nasir Ali (season 3), a wealthy Arab prince who makes business deals with John Ross and Pamela.
