= Blame Game (Dallas) =

- Dallas episode
- Episode no.: Season 2 Episode 6
- Directed by: Jesse Bochco
- Written by: Gail Gilchriest
- Original air date: February 25, 2013

Guest appearances
- Judith Light as Judith Brown-Ryland; Carlos Bernard as Vicente Cano; Glenn Morshower as Lou Rosen

Episode chronology
← Previous "Trial and Error"	Next → "The Furious and the Fast"

"Blame Game" is the sixth episode in the second season (2013) of the television series Dallas.

== Summary ==
Ann has been found guilty of shooting Harris Ryland and has been sent to jail; and Vicente Cano, J.R. and John Ross' financial provider and enemy from season one, is released from jail and awaiting extradition to Venezuela. When Sue Ellen goes to see Ann in jail, she tells her that all the Ewings are ready to present as character witnesses to Ann's good will. Ann is convinced that it will do no good, because she saw the juror's faces and she knows that they will give her the maximum punishment of 25 years. Sue Ellen tells Ann to stay positive and that they will fight for her. On her way out, Sue Ellen sees Christopher and Elena in the lobby of the courthouse. Sue Ellen tells Elena that she is disappointed she has not heard back from her regarding progress on the Henderson Oil Field. Elena apologizes but with recent events, she was distracted. Sue Ellen tells her to get to work or she will be calling in the loan in two weeks. Meanwhile, Vicente Cano, meets (in handcuffs) with the Venezuelan Council General regarding his extradition home. After a veiled threat, the Council General tells him that he will remain in the embassy until it is time to leave for Venezuela. As Vicente is being moved to secure quarters, he asks one of his men on the inside of the Council General's staff if everything is in place for the next day and reveals he has a going-away present for the Ewings.

== Production ==
=== Appearance of Larry Hagman ===
Larry Hagman (1931-2012) died before production of the episode began. The scene wherein his nurse is introducing him to his iPad is a deleted scene from earlier in the season. That was done to make it seem as if J.R. were actually in the house when he began to message Bobby from his room.

== Broadcast and Reception ==
The episode was watched by 2.55 million viewers.
