= Marlene Forte =

American actress

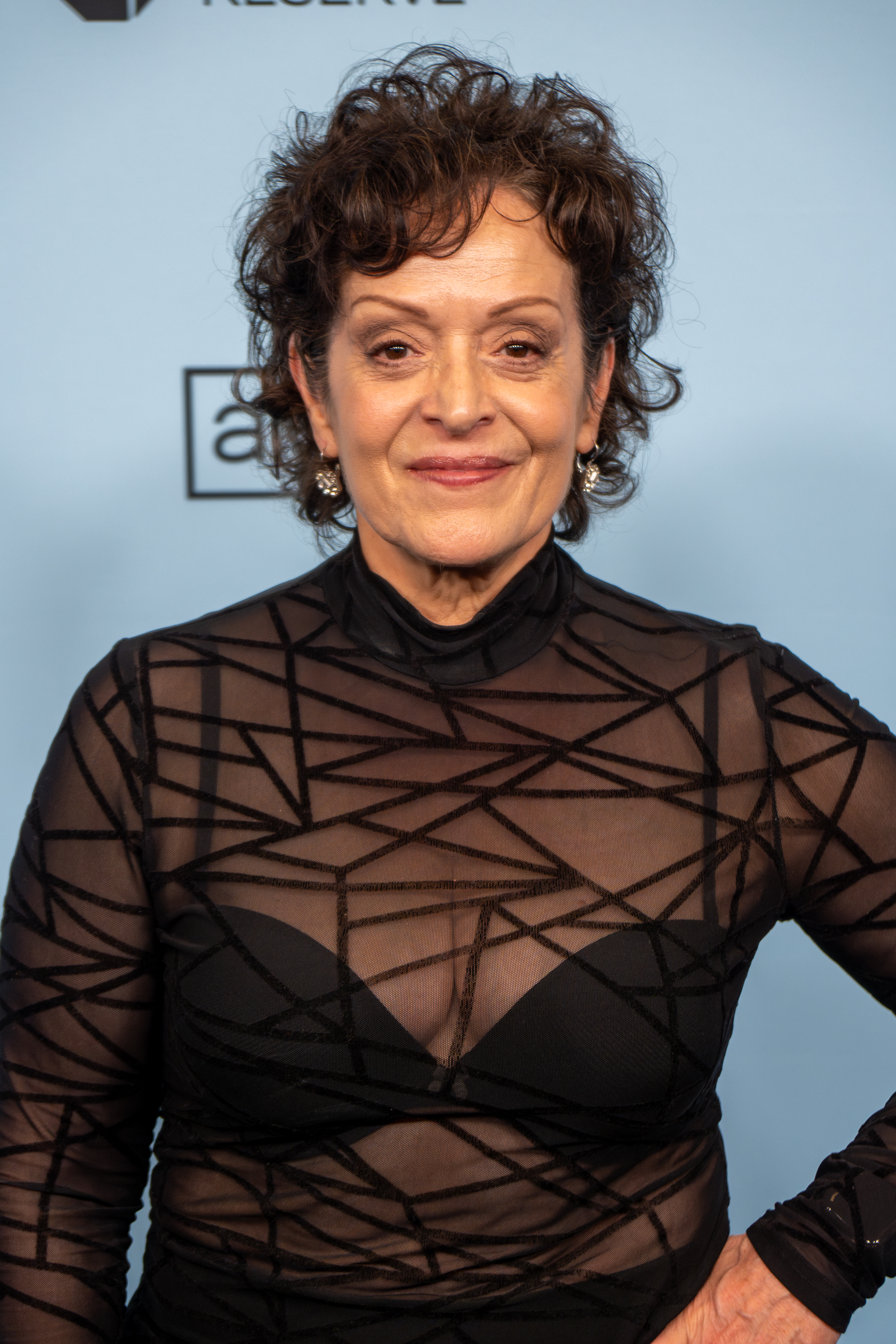
- Forte at the 2025 Sundance Film Festival
- Other name: Marlene Forté
- Citizenship: United States
- Occupations: Actress; producer
- Years active: 1990–present
- Spouse: Oliver Mayer (m. 2006)
- Children: 1

Marlene Forte is an American actress and producer. She is perhaps best known for her role as Carmen Ramos on the television soap opera Dallas (2012–2014). Forte also had recurring roles in Fear the Walking Dead, The Fosters and Altered Carbon. Her notable film credits including A Haunted House (2013), El Chicano (2018), Knives Out (2019), and The Way Back (2020).

== Career ==
On television, Forte appeared in recurring roles on Tyler Perry's House of Payne, Crossing Jordan, and The Secret Life of the American Teenager. Her film appearances include the transporter chief in the 2009 Star Trek reboot and Mrs. Glass in Real Women Have Curves.

In 2012, Forte was cast on TNT's revamped Dallas, playing Carmen Ramos, longtime Ewing family housekeeper and mother to Elena (played by Jordana Brewster). She played another housekeeper in the 2013 comedy film, A Haunted House, and co-starred in the Tyler Perry's The Single Moms Club (2014). After Dallas, Forte had recurring role as Elena Gutierrez in the ABC Family drama series, The Fosters from 2015 to 2017.

In 2016, Forte played Celia Flores, the main antagonist during the first half of season 2 of the AMC horror drama series, Fear the Walking Dead. In 2018, she was cast as Alazne Ortega for the first season of the Netflix science fiction drama series, Altered Carbon. Her other television credits include Claws, Mayans M.C., Runaways, Superstore and The Conners. Forte also played supporting roles in the 2018 superhero film El Chicano as Raúl Castillo's character' mother, 2019 mystery crime comedy Knives Out as Ana de Armas' mother, and 2020 drama film The Way Back. In 2021, she appeared in the Netflix vampire film Night Teeth.

In 2022, Forte starred and produced horror thriller film Hypochondriac that premiered at the South by Southwest festival.

== Personal life ==
Forte married screenwriter Oliver Mayer in 2006. They live in Los Angeles, California. They have no children together, but Forte has daughter Giselle Rodriguez, who works as a producer, from a previous relationship. Forte is the sister of HSN host Lesley Ann Machado.

== Filmography ==
=== Film ===
Year	Title	Role	Notes
1991	The Color of Love		
1991	The Bronx War		
1997	Lena's Dreams	Lena	Also producer
1998	Mob Queen	Chica	
1998	Bury the Evidence	The Naked Woman	
2000	Our Song	Pilar Brown	
2000	The Love Machine	Becca Campbell	
2000	The Accountant		
2000	Cusp	Mother	Short
2001	Reunion	Margaret	
2002	Real Women Have Curves	Mrs. Glass	
2003	What Really Happened During the Cuban Missile Crisis	Socorro	Short
2004	Darkness Minus Twelve	Marta Gutierrez	Short
2004	Anyone		Short
2004	Indocumentados	Mother	
2005	Cuco Gomez-Gomez Is Dead!	Cuban Lady	Short
2005	Shooting Vegetarians	Amber	
2006	Cut Off	Lydia	
2007	Adrift in Manhattan	Marta Colon	
2008	Glow Ropes: The Rise and Fall of a Bar Mitzvah Emcee	Mrs. Lopefrawitz	
2009	Star Trek	Transport Chief	
2011	My Last Day Without You	Luz	
2011	Deep Blue Breath	Nurse Talbot	Short
2013	A Haunted House	Rosa	
2013	Plush	Dr. Ortiz	
2013	Unidentified		
2013	Times Like These	Gladys	Short
2014	The Single Moms Club	Manny's Mother	
2015	I Am Gangster	Tia	
2016	Irving	Vivian	Short
2018	El Chicano	Susanna Hernandez	
2019	Knives Out	Mrs. Cabrera	
2020	The Way Back	Gale	
2021	The Guilty	House on Fire Caller	Voice
2021	Night Teeth	Abuela	
2022	A Place in the Field	Rondi	
2022	Hypochondriac	Mom	Also associate producer
2022	9 Bullets	Grandma Lucy	
2022	Aristotle and Dante Discover the Secrets of the Universe	Tia Ophelia	
2023	You Can't Stay Here	Angela	
2025	Touch Me	Laura	
TBA	Bethesda	Marta	Post-production

=== Television ===
Year	Title	Role	Notes
1996	New York Undercover	Mrs. Flores	"Blue Boy"
1997	The Untold Story of the World Trade Center Bombing	Monica Smith	TV film
1997	Law & Order	Sandra Pena	"Double Down"
1999	Law & Order	Alicia Bowers	"Shield"
2000	Judging Amy	Margaret Lopez	"Zero to Sixty"
2000	Family Law	Silvia Guerrero	"The Choice"
2000	Mysterious Ways	Gloria Capistrano	"Reason to Cry"
2001	Walker, Texas Ranger	Elena Guerro	"Golden Boy"
2001	My Wife and Kids	Rosa Lopez	"Pilot", "A Little Romance"
2001	Crossing Jordan	Gloria	Recurring role
2002	For the People	Marisol Martinez	"Racing Form", "Nascent"
2003	Nip/Tuck	Miss Michaels	"Pilot"
2003	George Lopez	Sylvia	"Dubya, Dad and Dating: Part 1"
2004	CSI: Miami	Judge Veracruz	"Pro Per"
2005	Bones	Ambassador Olivos	"A Boy in a Tree"
2006	The West Wing	SSA Linda	"The Last Hurrah"
2006	Windfall	Mrs. Maduro	"Crash Into You"
2006	The Unit	Maritza Calderon	"Off the Meter"
2007	Seemore's Playhouse	Herself	
2007	Day Break	Mrs. Garza	"What If They're Connected?", "What If He's Not Alone?", "What If It's Him?"
2007	Lost	Det. Mason	"The Man from Tallahassee"
2007	CSI: Crime Scene Investigation	Mrs. Pamela Gentry	"Big Shots"
2007	Lincoln Heights	Mayor Giselle Amezcua	"Flashpoint"
2007	ER	Mrs. Gonzalez	"The War Comes Home"
2008	Jericho	Teresa Clemons	"Return to Jericho"
2008	Ylse	Bianca	TV series
2008	Little Girl Lost: The Delimar Vera Story	Tatita	TV film Nominated — Imagen Award for Best Supporting Actress/Television
2008	Cold Case	Yesenia Ramos	"True Calling"
2008–09	Tyler Perry's House of Payne	Rosie Hernandez	Recurring role
2010	Criminal Minds	Sheriff Ruiz	"Rite of Passage"
2010	Community	Doctora Escodera	"English as a Second Language"
2010	Past Life	Lucinda Morales	"Gone Daddy Gone"
2010	Eastbound & Down	Soledad Sanchez	"Chapter 11"
2010	The Whole Truth	Louisa Diaz	"Cold Case"
2011	Castle	Blanca	"The Final Nail"
2011	The Mentalist	Isabella Artega	"Rhapsody in Red"
2011	Law & Order: LA	Inez Gomez	"Westwood"
2011–13	Caribe Road	Capt. Garcia	Recurring role
2011–13	The Secret Life of the American Teenager	Kathy's Grandmother	"Past History", "Girlfriends", "It's a Miracle", "Money for Nothin'"
2012–14	Dallas	Carmen Ramos	Recurring role
2013	Major Crimes	Mary Torres	"The Deep End"
2015	Murder in Mexico: The Bruce Beresford-Redman Story	Evelyn Chavez	TV film
2015	Code Black	Lucia	"We Plug Holes"
2015–17	The Fosters	Elena Gutierrez	Recurring role
2016	NCIS: New Orleans	Rita Ortega	"Undocumented"
2016	Fear the Walking Dead	Celia Flores	"Blood in the Streets", "Sicut Cervus", "Shiva"
2017	Superstore	Connie Sosa	"Integrity Award"
2017	APB	Mita	"Hard Reset", "Personal Matters", "Above & Beyond", "Last Train to Europa"
2017–18	Marvel's Runaways	Graciela Aguirre	3 episodes
2018	Altered Carbon	Alazne Ortega	6 episodes
2018	Mayans M.C.		2 episodes
2017-2021	Superstore	Connie Sosa	3 episodes
2019	Snowfall	I.A. Detective Vasquez	Episode: "The Bottoms"
2019	Ghostwriter	Grandma	Episode
2020	All Rise	Josephine Calderon	Episode: "Bye Bye Bernie"
2020	Curb Your Enthusiasm	Nurse Marlene	Episode: "The Spite Store"
2020	The Conners	Tia Elsie	Episode: "Tats and Tias"
2021	Ghostwriter	Grandma	Episode: "Ghost Castaways, Part 2"
2021	Good Girls	Rio's Grandmother	Episodes: "Grandma Loves Grisham" and "Broken Toys"
2021	Grey's Anatomy	Carmen Delgado	Episodes: "I'm Still Standing" and "Someone Saved My Life Tonight"
2021	The Resident	Cherry Sandoval	Episode: "The Long and Winding Road"
2022	The Lincoln Lawyer	Judge Medina	Episode: "Momentum"
2023	The Rookie	Carla Juarez	3 episodes
2025	Matlock	Sister Louise	season 2 episode 6 "Harm Reduction"
2026	Tracker	Leanne Corbett	Episode: “Reclamation”
