= Nicolas Treviño =

- Dallas character
- Portrayed by: Juan Pablo Di Pace
- Duration: 2014
- First appearance: February 28, 2014; The Return
- Last appearance: September 22, 2014; Brave New World
- Created by: David Jacobs
In-universe information
- Occupation: Multi-Billionaire Businessman and Investor; Partner in Ewing Global (2014)
- Spouse: Lucia Treviño

Nicolas Treviño is a fictional character on the TNT primetime soap opera, Dallas. He is portrayed by Juan Pablo Di Pace.

== Brief character history ==
Born in Mexico, Joaquin Reyes was a childhood friend of Elena Ramos and her brother, Drew. Elena convinced her parents to take in homeless Joaquin, and he lived with the Ramos family until they left for Dallas, Texas. After Elena's family moved to Dallas, he left his local Catholic school in Mexico and joined a street gang. The leader, Ernest Mendez-Ochoa, saw Joaquin had skills with numbers and mathematics and sent him to school in Europe. Upon his return, he took the name Nicolas Trevino and the street gang had grown into the Mendez-Ochoa Cartel. He invested in a deal that lost the Cartel $600 million and the Cartel threatened his wife, Lucia, and sons until the money was repaid. Nicolas went to the Cartel leader saying he wanted out of the Cartel. The leader agreed to let Nicolas go once Nicolas delivered enough money for the Cartel to buy the next Mexican presidential election and thus control the Mexican government.

Nicolas arrives in Dallas presumably to act as Cliff Barnes's proxy for his 1/3 of Ewing Global. Nicolas secretly agrees to help Elena get revenge on the Ewings for J.R. stealing her father's land. Elena secures a job with Ewing Global only to be acting as a mole planted by Cliff and Nicolas. Christopher Ewing invites Nicolas to the Ewing barbecue in an effort to raise capital for the arctic leases then goes to Mexico to investigate Nicolas' background when details about his alleged deal with Cliff Barnes don't ring true. Nicolas attempts to bribe a witness in the Cliff Barnes murder case, but he is met by Bobby when he drops off the bribe money. In Mexico, Christopher meets a man who was cheated out of his share of the profits from a drug patent by Nicolas. He is then taken to the Trevino family compound where he is introduced to Nicolas' wife, Lucia, and their sons. A guilt-ridden Drew is in hiding at the Trevino compound in Mexico. Nicolas and Elena start an affair. Lucia travels to Dallas and confronts Nicolas about his relationship with Elena and blackmails him over his threat to divorce her. Elena and Nicolas attempt to divide Pamela and John Ross in a new deal Ewing Global is in to purchase oil leases in the Alaskan Arctic. Nicolas, after telling Elena he wouldn't, sends Pamela a video of John Ross having sex with Emma. Drew returns to Dallas, which leads to a beating from Christopher. Drew remains in hiding but threatens to the ruin of Nicolas and Elena's plans to get his newfound revenge on the Ewings, which causes Nicolas to contact the Mendez-Ochoa Cartel in order to stop Drew.

Drew is captured by the Mendez-Ochoa Cartel. It's revealed Drew started the fire at Southfork but news arrives that Sue Ellen has taken responsibility for starting the fire. Drew learns that Nicolas has been using Elena to repay his debt to the Cartel and confronts Nicolas. Nicolas agrees when the Cartel kills Drew and disguises it as a suicide. Luis and Nicolas dispose of Drew's body on the oil field where his father died years ago. The detective and fire investigator later concluded that Drew committed suicide where he was the prime suspect of setting the fire. The fire investigator reveals Drew committed arson where he sprayed rocket fuel on a window curtain and used an IED to set the fire in the guise of a plug-in an air freshener. Elena and her mother confront the Ewings with the proof for J.R. stealing the oil-rich land that belonged to Elena's father. Nicolas’ plan to take over Ewing Global in the upcoming IPO for the Cartel moves forward. John Ross learns from Bum that Nicolas sent Pamela the video of John Ross and Emma having sex. In front of Elena, John Ross reveals to Nicolas that Elena only obtained J.R.'s letter because she had sex with John Ross. As Ewing Global goes public, the man in charge of the IPO, Calvin Hannah is removed from the IPO at the last minute and replaced with Nicolas' man. Hunter McKay buys all of the shares with money from the Mendez-Ochoa cartel on orders of Nicolas but Hunter is killed shortly afterward and Nicolas takes his shares in Ewing Global. It's revealed that Cliff gave Nicolas 3% of Ewing Global and combined with the 48% they acquired gives them control of Ewing Global. Christopher meets with Nicolas' wife Lucia and informs her that Nicolas and Elena are having an affair. She tells Nicolas that Christopher knows his real identity and his debt to the Cartel. It is revealed that Lucia hired the photographer to spy on Nicolas and Elena. Later after Lucia learns of Nicolas' affair with Elena, she again meets Christopher and agrees to help him find Nicolas. Nicolas confesses to Elena the truth about his past and that he used her to pay off his debt. Elena is angry that Nicolas used her but he warns her that until the Cartel has enough money to buy the next Mexican presidential election Nicolas, Elena, Lucia, and his sons are all in danger.
