= Blood Relatives (TV series) =

American crime documentary TV series (2012–2017)

- Genre: Documentary
- Narrated by: Brenda Strong
- Country of origin: United States
- Original language: English
- No. of seasons: 6
- No. of episodes: 56

Production
- Executive producers: Brian Puterman; David Cargill; Mike Mathis; Thomas Cutler
- Producers: David Connelly; Joe Peicott; Patrick Shea
- Running time: 42 minutes
- Production company: Mike Mathis Productions

Original release
- Network: Investigation Discovery
- Release: June 7, 2012 – December 14, 2017

Blood Relatives is an American documentary television series on Investigation Discovery that debuted on June 7, 2012. Narrated by Brenda Strong, the series examines murders that were committed within families. Blood Relatives ended in 2017, after its sixth season.
