= Texas Music Revolution =

Texas Country Music festival

Texas Music Revolution is a Texas Country Music festival that began in 1997 and has been running for the past 14 years. The festival is hosted by KHYI-95.3 FM The Range, and sponsored by many businesses from the Dallas/Ft. Worth area as well as businesses from other parts of Texas such as Shiner Bock. The festival is traditionally (for the past 12 years) located at Southfork Ranch in Parker, TX.

In 2018, Texas Music Revolution or "TMR14" featured artists such as Merrol Ray, John David Kent, Walt Wilkins, Brandon Jenkins, and Hayes Carll.
