= Afton Cooper =

Fictional character from the American television series Dallas

- Dallas character
- Audrey Landers as Afton (2013)
- Portrayed by: Audrey Landers
- Duration: 1981–84, 1989, 1996, 2013–14
- First appearance: January 16, 1981; End of the Road: Part 1
- Last appearance: March 17, 2014; Lifting the Veil
- Spin-off appearances: Dallas: J.R. Returns
In-universe information
- Occupation: Singer
- Parents: Arliss Cooper
- Siblings: Mitch Cooper
- Spouse: Harrison Van Buren III (divorced)
- Children: Pamela Rebecca Barnes

Afton Cooper (formerly Van Buren) is a fictional character from the popular American television series Dallas, played by Audrey Landers. Joining the cast during season 4 and remaining until the first episode of season 8, Landers returned at the end of season 12 for five episodes, an episode in season 13 and reprised her role one more time in the 1996 TV movie, Dallas: J.R. Returns. In 2013, Afton returned in season 2 of the 2012 reboot series, Dallas.

== Storylines ==
Afton is the sister of Mitch Cooper, Lucy Ewing's husband. J.R. Ewing is immediately attracted to Afton and they wind up in bed. J.R. gets her a singing job in a bar where she meets Cliff Barnes. Afton and Cliff become romantically involved but it doesn't last long because Afton thinks Cliff is a loser. Unlike her brother Mitch, Afton is fond of money. When Cliff Barnes has a case against J.R. concerning the counter revolution in South East Asia, Afton plots with J.R. to drug Cliff so J.R. can get his hands on the evidence that connects J.R. to a counter-revolution. Eventually Afton turns against J.R. and falls for Cliff. After Sue Ellen divorces J.R., Sue Ellen and Cliff resume their previous relationship and Cliff loses interest in Afton. However, Afton still loves Cliff and later, when Cliff attempts suicide, Afton finds him and is able to save his life. In 1985, Afton gave birth to Cliff's daughter, Pamela Rebecca Barnes, though at first Afton denied the paternity.

== Dallas (2012 TV series) ==
In the 2012 cliffhanger of the first season, it was revealed that Christopher Ewing's wife "Rebecca Sutter" was in fact Pamela Rebecca Barnes, the daughter of Cliff Barnes and Afton.

In 2013, Afton returned to Dallas in the 10th episode of season 2, visiting her daughter Pamela in the hospital. She was there when Pamela lost the twins after her near-fatal accident.

Afton returned to Dallas in season 3, episode 4, for Pamela and John Ross' wedding. In a heated exchange, Sue Ellen comments that "the most despicable thing J.R. ever did ... was you".
