= Ann Ewing (Dallas) =

- Dallas character
- Brenda Strong as Ann Ewing
- Portrayed by: Brenda Strong
- Duration: 2012–14
- First appearance: June 13, 2012; Changing of the Guard
- Last appearance: September 22, 2014; Brave New World
- Created by: Cynthia Cidre
In-universe information
- Husband: Harris Ryland (198?–92); Bobby Ewing (2005–)
- Daughters: Emma Judith Ryland
- Stepsons: Christopher Ewing

Ann Ewing is a fictional character from the TNT soap opera Dallas, portrayed by Brenda Strong. She made her first appearance on season 10 episode 18 as a one night stand of Cliff Barnes. She was recast as Ann during the episode broadcast on June 13, 2012. Strong's casting was announced on April 5, 2011. Ann is the third wife of Bobby Ewing (Patrick Duffy). The couple married in 2005 and Ann has become the matriarch of Southfork Ranch. She is protective of her stepson and loyal to her family.

== Casting ==
On April 5, 2011, Matt Webb Mitovich from TVLine reported former Desperate Housewives actress Brenda Strong had joined the cast of TNT's continuation of Dallas. Strong was cast in the role of Ann, Bobby Ewing's (Patrick Duffy) new wife. Strong previously made a guest appearance in the original series of Dallas in 1987 as "Cliff's One Night Stand".

== Development ==
Introduced by their mutual friend Sue Ellen, Ann married Bobby Ewing seven years prior to the start of the show. She has become the matriarch of Southfork and proven to be a rock to her husband during his battles with his "dysfunctional relatives." Ann is also protective of her stepson, Christopher Ewing (Jesse Metcalfe), and his rights to the family's land. Strong told The Hollywood Reporter's Jethro Nededog that Ann is the bridge between the old and new generation of the Ewing family. She explained "And because she is an outsider herself, she can relate to not feeling like she necessarily belongs, but at the same time is fiercely loyal to this family. So, she is the glue…" The actress stated that her character is strong and tenderhearted and later commented that she "will go toe-to-toe with anyone who messes with her loved ones. She's the modern-day Miss Ellie." Ann's mysterious secret that was hinted at in season 1 was revealed in season 2. A long time ago, Ann had a daughter with Harris Ryland named Emma. However, she was kidnapped at 18 months by her overprotective father Harris. Ann has now reunited with her daughter and hopes to have a future with her.

== Family ==
Ann has a daughter with Harris Ryland called Emma Ryland (also known as Emma Brown). Her birth name is revealed in the second season as Emma Judith Ryland. Emma is played by Emma Bell. According to showrunner and creator of the revival series, Cynthia Cidre, Ann Ewing could have a brother.
