= Dallas (2012 TV series) =

American prime time soap opera (2012–2014)

- Genre: Drama; Soap opera
- Created by: David Jacobs
- Based on: Dallas by David Jacobs
- Developed by: Cynthia Cidre
- Starring: Josh Henderson; Jesse Metcalfe; Jordana Brewster; Julie Gonzalo; Brenda Strong; Patrick Duffy; Linda Gray; Larry Hagman; Mitch Pileggi; Emma Bell; Kuno Becker; Juan Pablo Di Pace
- Composers: Rob Cairns; Jerrold Immel (original theme)
- Country of origin: United States
- No. of seasons: 3
- No. of episodes: 40 (list of episodes)

Production
- Executive producers: Cynthia Cidre; Bruce Rasmussen; Michael M. Robin; Ken Topolsky; Bryan J. Raber
- Running time: 42 minutes
- Production companies: Cyntax Productions; Warner Horizon Television

Original release
- Network: TNT
- Release: June 13, 2012 – September 22, 2014

Related
- Dallas (1978–91); Knots Landing

Dallas is an American prime time soap opera developed by Cynthia Cidre and produced by Warner Horizon Television, that aired on TNT from June 13, 2012, to September 22, 2014. The series was a revival of the prime time television soap opera that was created by David Jacobs and which aired on CBS from 1978 to 1991. The series revolves around the Ewings, an affluent Dallas family in the oil and cattle-ranching industries.

The series brought back several stars of the original series, including Patrick Duffy as Bobby Ewing, Linda Gray as Sue Ellen Ewing, and Larry Hagman as J.R. Ewing in major roles. Other stars of the original series made guest appearances, including Ken Kercheval as Cliff Barnes, Steve Kanaly as Ray Krebbs, and Charlene Tilton as Lucy Ewing, as well as Ted Shackelford as Gary Ewing, and Joan van Ark as Valene Ewing, who starred in the Dallas spin-off series Knots Landing. They were joined by the next generation of characters, including Josh Henderson as John Ross Ewing III, the son of J.R. and Sue Ellen Ewing; Jesse Metcalfe as Christopher Ewing, the adopted son of Bobby and Pamela Barnes Ewing; and Julie Gonzalo as Pamela Rebecca Barnes, the daughter of Cliff Barnes and Afton Cooper.

The series was made for TNT, sister company to Warner Bros. Television, which has owned the original series since its purchase of Lorimar Television (the original show's production company) in 1989. On July 8, 2011, after viewing the completed pilot episode, TNT gave a green light for the series with a 10-episode order, which premiered on June 13, 2012. On June 29, 2012, TNT renewed Dallas for a second season consisting of 15 episodes, which premiered on January 28, 2013. On April 30, 2013, TNT renewed Dallas for a third season consisting of 15 episodes that premiered on Monday, February 24, 2014. On October 3, 2014, the series was cancelled by TNT after three seasons, because of the declining ratings and the death of Larry Hagman.

== Plot ==
The series revolves around the Ewings, an affluent Dallas family in the oil and cattle-ranching industries. It focuses mainly on Christopher Ewing, the adopted son of Bobby and Pam Ewing, and John Ross Ewing III, the son of J.R. and Sue Ellen Ewing. Both John Ross and Christopher were born during the original series' run and were featured in it as children (played by different actors). Now grown up, John Ross has become almost a mirror of his father, bent on oil, money, and power. Christopher, meanwhile, has become a lot like Bobby, in that he is more interested in the upkeep of Southfork Ranch. As an additional point of contention, Christopher is also becoming a player in alternative energy, thereby eschewing the oil business. However, John Ross is determined to resurrect the Ewings' former position in the oil industry. John Ross states in season one that he is J.R.'s eldest child, which contradicts the storyline in the original series where J.R.'s first born son James Beaumont appeared in seasons 13–14.

Alongside John Ross and Christopher, original series characters Bobby, J.R. and Sue Ellen return for the new series. Additional familiar characters, including J.R.'s and Bobby's niece Lucy Ewing, their half-brother Ray Krebbs, and Ewing family rival Cliff Barnes (Ken Kercheval) appear occasionally. Various other characters from the original series also make appearances, including Audrey Landers (Afton Cooper), Cathy Podewell (Cally Harper Ewing) and Deborah Shelton (Mandy Winger). Ted Shackelford and Joan Van Ark, who first appeared on Dallas in the late 1970s before joining the spin-off series Knots Landing, also return as Gary and Valene Ewing.

New main characters that made their appearances in season one included Bobby's third wife, Ann; Christopher's new wife, introduced as "Rebecca Sutter" but later revealed to be Pamela Rebecca Barnes, the daughter of Cliff Barnes and Afton Cooper; and Elena Ramos, the daughter of Ewing family cook Carmen Ramos (Marlene Forte), who is caught in a love triangle with Christopher and John Ross. Harris Ryland is Ann's villainous ex-husband. New main characters that made their appearances in season 2 included Ann and Harris's daughter, Emma Ryland, and Elena Ramos's brother Drew Ramos. In season two, Judith Brown Ryland joined as Harris Ryland's controlling mother, while in season three, Nicolas Treviño joined as a childhood friend of Elena and Drew's who returns to help Cliff Barnes take over the Ewing oil company.

== Cast and characters ==
The 2012 Dallas cast. From left: Jordana Brewster, Josh Henderson, Linda Gray, Larry Hagman, Patrick Duffy, Brenda Strong, Jesse Metcalfe and Julie Gonzalo.

=== Regular cast ===
- Josh Henderson as John Ross Ewing III, J.R. and Sue Ellen's son. Ambitious and anxious to prove himself by following in his father's footsteps, he is determined to start drilling for oil at Southfork.
- Jesse Metcalfe as Christopher Ewing, the adopted son of Bobby and his ex-wife Pam Ewing and the biological son of Sue Ellen's younger sister Kristin Shepard. In the pilot, after spending years in Asia researching alternative energy, Christopher returns to Southfork to get married.
- Jordana Brewster as Elena Ramos, the daughter of the Ewing family cook, and childhood friend of Christopher and John Ross, both of whom are in love with her. She has a master's degree in energy resources.
- Julie Gonzalo as Pamela Rebecca Barnes, under the alias of Rebecca Sutter she marries Christopher in the pilot and was pregnant with twins but miscarried them in "Guilt & Innocence". It is revealed in the season 1 finale that she is Cliff Barnes's daughter with Afton Cooper.
- Brenda Strong as Ann Ewing, Bobby's third wife and an old friend of Sue Ellen. She has assumed the role of matriarch of Southfork while dealing with her ruthless brother-in-law J.R. Ewing and her ex-husband Harris Ryland.
- Patrick Duffy as Bobby Ewing, the youngest son of Jock and Miss Ellie and the adoptive father of Christopher. A family man at heart and owner of the Southfork Ranch, Bobby is determined to keep the promise he made to his now-deceased mother: never to allow oil drilling on Southfork.
- Linda Gray as Sue Ellen Ewing, the mother of John Ross and J.R.'s ex-wife. Since leaving J.R., Sue Ellen has grown confident and influential with a budding career in politics and ran for governor. She still harbors feelings of guilt for using John Ross in revenge against J.R. during his childhood.
- Larry Hagman as J.R. Ewing, (seasons 1–2) The eldest son of Jock and Miss Ellie and John Ross's father. A cunning and ruthless oil baron, J.R. has spent his recent years in a nursing home, being treated for clinical depression. Hagman died during production of season 2, signalling the on-screen death of J.R. Ewing.
- Emma Bell as Emma Brown (seasons 2–3) daughter of Ann Ewing and Harris Ryland. Her birth name is revealed in season 2 as Emma Judith Ryland. She starts romances with John Ross and Drew Ramos.
- Mitch Pileggi as Harris Ryland (seasons 2–3, recurring previously), the head of Ryland Transport and Ann's ex-husband. Ruthless, narcissistic and always eager for more power, he has been shown enjoying tormenting his former wife, as well as trying to blackmail Sue Ellen and suing Bobby.
- Kuno Becker as Andreas "Drew" Ramos (season 3; recurring, season 2), Elena's troubled brother. He witnessed his father's death, which turned him into an angry juvenile delinquent. He ended up enlisting in the military and after a tour in Iraq straightened him up, he found work on oil rigs all over the globe. He is on the run now after blowing up the Ewing rig.
- Juan Pablo Di Pace as Nicolas Treviño (season 3), born Joaquin Reyes, a childhood friend of Elena and Drew Ramos who becomes a powerful self-made billionaire businessman from Mexico. He comes across as a good, genuine guy, even though there are darker parts of his personality which he's hiding.

=== Recurring cast ===
- Ken Kercheval as Cliff Barnes, the long-time rival of J.R., as well as the brother of Christopher's adoptive mother and Bobby's first wife, Pamela Barnes Ewing
- Judith Light as Judith Brown-Ryland (seasons 2–3), Harris Ryland's mother, "an authoritative and controlling battleaxe who will fight to the death to protect the people she loves". She is majority stockholder in Ryland Transportation.
- Leonor Varela as Veronica Martinez/Marta Del Sol (season 1), a mentally unstable con artist who pretends to be a Mexican heiress
- Callard Harris as Tommy Sutter (season 1), Rebecca's supposed older brother, involved in her plot to extort money from Christopher
- Marlene Forte as Carmen Ramos, the faithful Southfork cook and Elena and Drew's mother
- Charlene Tilton as Lucy Ewing, niece of J.R. and Bobby and the older cousin of John Ross and Christopher. She is the daughter of Gary and Valene Ewing and was a main character in the original series.
- Steve Kanaly as Ray Krebbs, Jock's illegitimate son and the half-brother of J.R., Bobby and Gary. A main character in the original series, he was the ranch foreman at Southfork until he left for Europe during season 12.
- Kevin Page as Steven "Bum" Jones, J.R. Ewing's private investigator, confidant, friend and right-hand man
- Lee Majors as Ken Richards (season 2), an old admirer of Sue Ellen's and a commissioner of T.E.S.H.A., a state agency looking into Christopher's rig explosion
- Steven Weber as Governor Sam McConaughey (seasons 2–3), who joins forces with Cliff Barnes and Harris Ryland to try and take down the Ewings
- Faran Tahir as Frank Ashkani (seasons 1–2), Cliff's menacing right-hand man. Born Rahid Durani in Islamabad, he was taken off the streets by Cliff some 30 years ago. Cliff gave him a proper education, eventually hired him as his private driver, and "adopted" him as a son.
- Carlos Bernard as Vicente Cano (seasons 1–2), a Venezuelan businessman who finances J.R. and John Ross' deal with Veronica. When the Ewings fail to hold up their end of the deal, he turns violent. He eventually is sentenced to prison, after federal agents raid his house.
- Alex Fernandez as Roy Vickers (season 2), Harris Ryland's right-hand man who is connected to the Mendez-Ochoa drug cartel
- Donny Boaz as Bo McCabe (seasons 2–3), a worker in Southfork Ranch's cattle operations first seen in the episode "A Call to Arms" as a drug pusher where Emma Ryland was scoring painkillers
- Jude Demorest as Candace Shaw (season 3), John Ross' secretary who is also a prostitute connected to Judith Ryland's prostitution ring
- Fran Kranz as Hunter McKay (season 3), the grandson of original character Carter McKay. A partying geek entrepreneur who played basketball with John Ross Ewing and Christopher Ewing as a kid. Founder of Get It Games video software company.

== Episodes ==
Season	Episodes	Originally released	
Season	Episodes	First released	Last released
1	10	June 13, 2012	August 8, 2012
2	15	January 28, 2013	April 15, 2013
3	15	February 24, 2014	September 22, 2014

== Production ==
Prior to Dallas, Cidre was best known for producing and writing episodes of Cane, an American television drama that chronicled the lives and internal power struggles of a powerful and affluent Cuban-American family running an immensely successful rum and sugar cane business in South Florida. In 2010, TNT announced it would order a pilot for the continuation of the Dallas series. The pilot was filmed in and around the city of Dallas in early 2011. Production began in late August 2011 in Dallas on the remaining nine episodes in the first season order, based in studios constructed for the Fox television series The Good Guys.

Executive producer Cynthia Cidre wrote the pilot script, while Michael M. Robin served as the director and executive producer for the pilot. David Jacobs reviewed Cidre's pilot script and gave his blessing to the new series though he has chosen not to participate in its production. A dispute erupted when the opening credits were originally planned to read "Developed by Cynthia Cidre, based on Dallas created by David Jacobs". But upon the determination of the Writers Guild of America's screenwriting credit system, there are currently two separate credits: one listing Jacobs as the show's sole creator and another listing Cidre as the new show's developer.

A sneak preview of the series, including clips from the pilot episode, aired on July 11, 2011, during an episode of TNT's Rizzoli & Isles. Patrick Duffy stated that the new show is "exactly the same [as the old show], but it's 2012. We consider this year 14 of the show. It's exactly as if [viewers] forgot which channel we were on."

=== Continuity ===
The new series is a continuation of the old series following a 20-year break, during which the characters and their relationships continued unseen until today when the new series begins. It does not take the events of the reunion TV movies Dallas: J.R. Returns or Dallas: War of the Ewings into account. Instead, we find the characters having evolved over the last 20 years. Cynthia Cidre, show developer, has confirmed that the new series does not pick up from where the TV movies left off because the movies had tried to resolve lingering plotlines in less than two hours. It continues from the events of the 14th season, their development and consequences extrapolated to 2012.

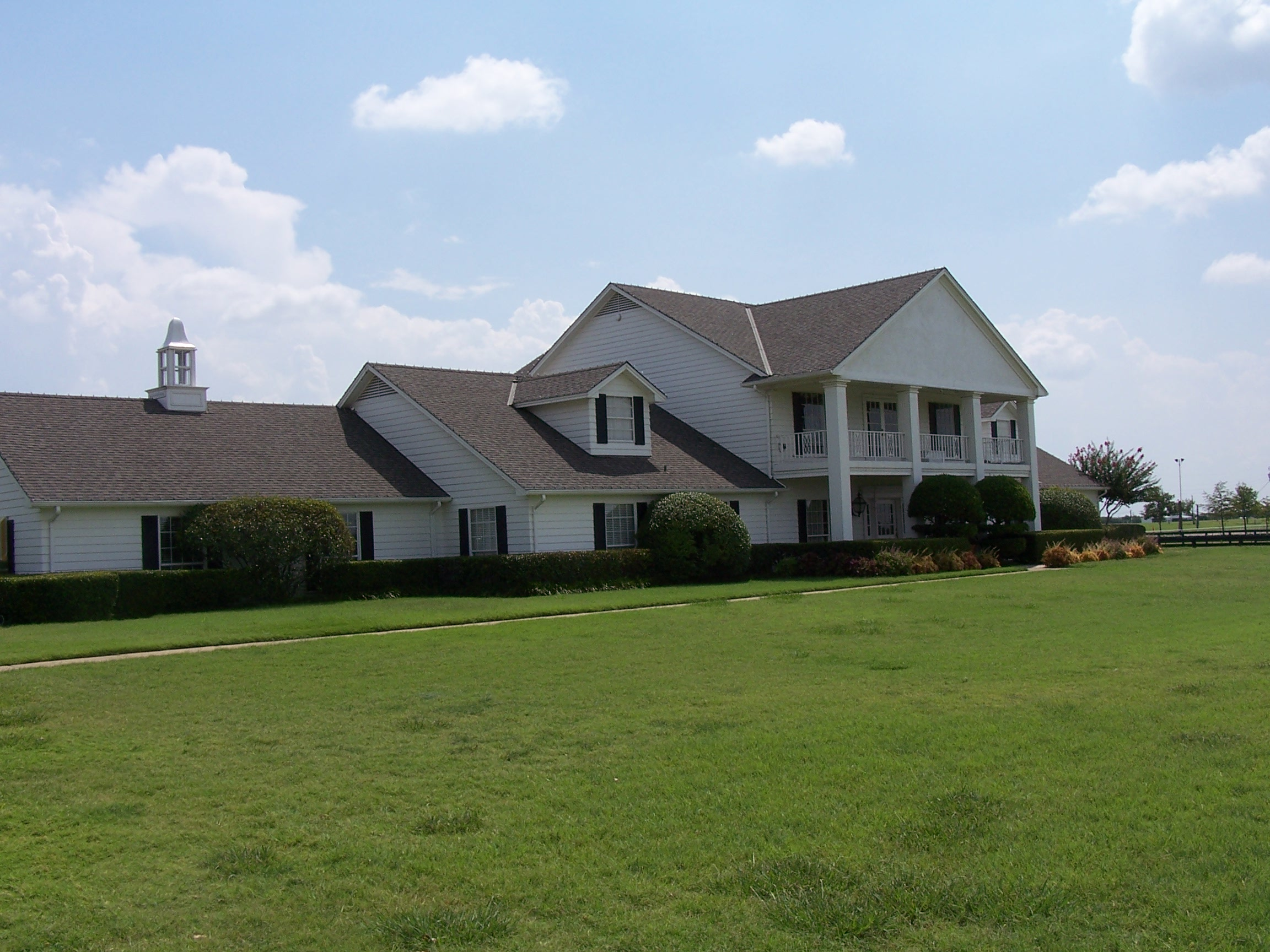
The Southfork Ranch, home of the Ewing family

=== Production crew ===
Cynthia Cidre, Bruce Rasmussen, Michael M. Robin, Ken Topolsky and Bryan J. Raber served as executive producers for the show. Rasmussen had previously worked as the supervising producer with the hit TV series Roseanne, for which he was awarded the Golden Globe.

In the first two seasons, Jesse Bochco and Michael M. Robin were the most prolific directors, each directing five episodes.

=== Filming ===
Unlike the original series, which did limited location shooting in Texas but was filmed primarily in Los Angeles, principal photography for the new series takes place in and around Dallas. The new series also did location shooting at the actual Southfork Ranch in the northern Dallas suburb of Parker.

=== Opening sequence ===
The opening sequence features a shortened version of the original theme music, and echoes the original series opening with modernized shots of Dallas in sliding panels. Unlike the original series, the actors are not listed alphabetically and, for seasons 1 and 2, there are no images of the actors seen in the credits. Josh Henderson and Jesse Metcalfe alternate top billing, and the original stars are credited at the end ("with Patrick Duffy", "and Linda Gray", "and Larry Hagman as J.R. Ewing") until Hagman's death in season 2. The Dallas logo scrolls from right to left, rather than zooming upwards as it did on the original series. The sequence ends on a shot with the camera flying towards Southfork similar to the shot in the original titles where the camera flies over the gate towards Southfork. The season 3 titles feature the return of the threeway split-screen opening, similar to those used in the original series for its first 11 years, with moving images of the actors. In addition, the Dallas season 3 logo zooms towards the screen as it did on the original series.

== Reception ==
Advance screening reviews of the series were generally positive from critics on Metacritic. On June 29, 2012, TNT renewed Dallas for a second season consisting of 15 episodes, which premiered on January 28, 2013. The second season received positive notice, with a score of 82/100 from reviews on Metacritic.

== Ratings ==
Season	# Ep.	Timeslot (ET)	Premiered		Ended		Average Viewers (in millions)
Season	# Ep.	Timeslot (ET)	Premiere	Viewers (in millions)	Finale	Viewers (in millions)	Average Viewers (in millions)
1	10	Wednesday 9:00 pm	June 13, 2012	6.86	August 8, 2012	4.29	4.5
2	15	Monday 9:00 pm	January 28, 2013	2.98	April 15, 2013	2.99	2.84
3	15	Monday 9:00 pm	February 24, 2014	2.65	September 22, 2014	1.72	1.92

== Home releases ==
Season	Episodes	Originally aired		DVD release dates		
Season	Episodes	Season premiere	Season finale	Region 1	Region 2	Region 4
1	10	June 13, 2012	August 8, 2012	January 8, 2013	November 12, 2012	TBA
2	15	January 28, 2013	April 15, 2013	February 11, 2014	October 7, 2013	TBA
3	15	February 24, 2014	September 22, 2014	January 13, 2015	August 24, 2015	TBA

== Awards and nominations ==
Awards and nominations for Dallas
Year	Association	Category	Recipients	Result
2012	ALMA Awards	Favorite TV Actress-Drama	Jordana Brewster	Nominated
2012	ALMA Awards	Favorite TV Actress-Drama	Julie Gonzalo	Nominated
2013	Key Art Awards	Best Trailer - Audio/Visual	Dallas Theme Song Video MashUp	Won
2013	NAMIC Vision Awards	Best Performance - Drama	Jordana Brewster	Nominated
2013	Imagen Awards	Best Primetime Television Program		Nominated
2013	Imagen Awards	Best Supporting Actress/Television	Jordana Brewster	Nominated
2013	Imagen Awards	Best Supporting Actress/Television	Julie Gonzalo	Nominated
