= Mitch Pileggi =

American actor (born 1952)

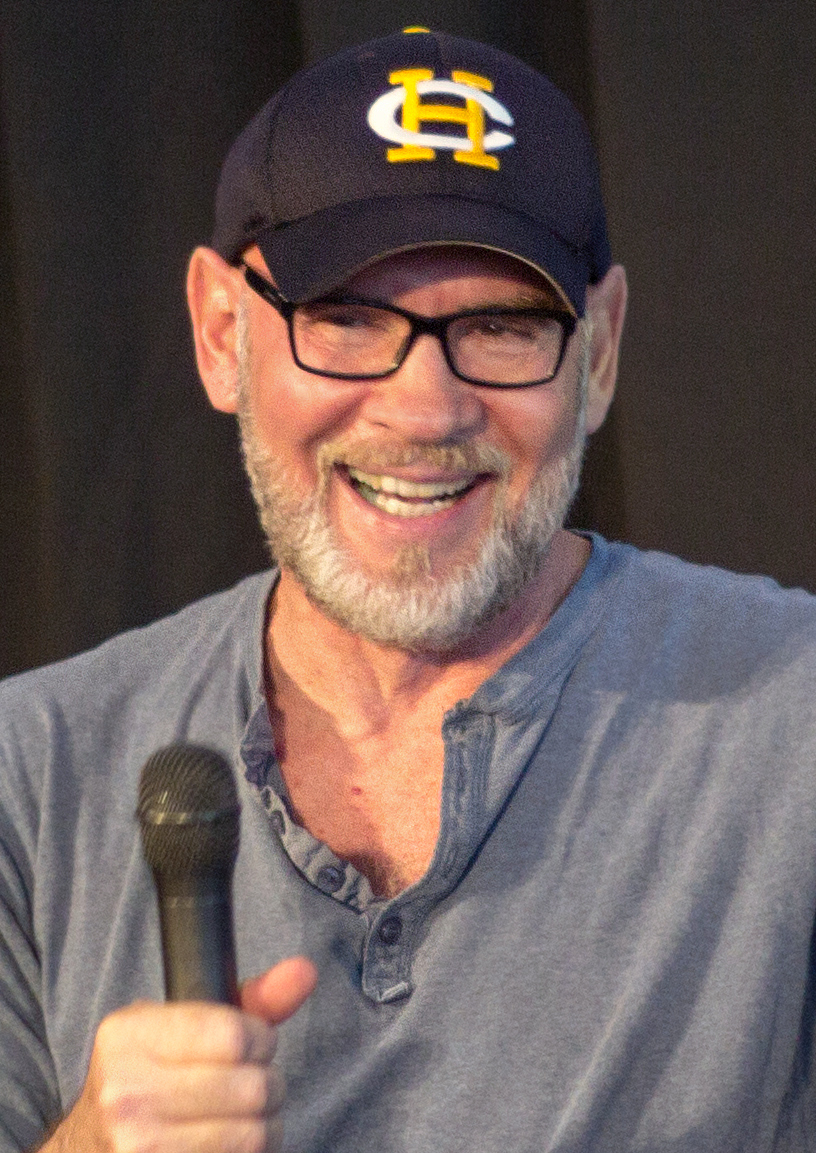
- Pileggi in 2013
- Born: April 5, 1952 (age 74); Portland, Oregon, U.S.
- Years active: 1982–present
- Spouse: Arlene Warren (m. 1997)
- Children: 1

Mitchell Pileggi (/pɪˈlɛdʒi/; born April 5, 1952) is an American actor. He played Horace Pinker in Shocker, Walter Skinner on The X-Files, Colonel Steven Caldwell on Stargate Atlantis, Ernest Darby in Sons of Anarchy, and Harris Ryland in the TNT revival of Dallas (2012–2014).

== Early life and education ==
Pileggi was born in Portland, Oregon, the son of Maxine, a homemaker, and Vito Pileggi, a defense contractor. Pileggi's family moved frequently because of his father's occupation, and Pileggi lived in Oregon, California, and Texas before spending most of his adolescence in Turkey.

== Career ==
Pileggi began acting while he was a high school student in Turkey, playing musical theater. After returning to Austin from Iran, he performed in local theaters and continued his acting career with small roles in B-movies and guest roles in television series, such as Dallas, China Beach, Code of Vengeance, and Walker, Texas Ranger.

In the 1980s, Pileggi starred in several films, including Three O'Clock High, as Duke "The Duker" Herman, an overzealous tough-as-nails high school parking lot security guard. In 1988, he starred in "Brothers In Arms" as one of the villains (Caleb) and in Shocker as body-possessing serial killer Horace Pinker. The latter was directed by horror icon Wes Craven. Pileggi played the villain in the 1991 television film, Knight Rider 2000, a sequel to the original television series Knight Rider. He also appeared briefly in the 1992 film Basic Instinct as an investigating police officer in the interrogation scene of Michael Douglas. He also appeared in the 1995 vampire film Vampire in Brooklyn (also directed by Craven) as an Italian mobster.

His most notable role was as the FBI's Assistant Director Walter Skinner on The X-Files. The role was originally recurring, but the part expanded, and in 2001 he became a regular member of the cast. The character gradually became the most integral character besides the two leads. He remained with the series until its end in 2002. Pileggi played the character in the 1998 The X-Files film and in the 2008 film The X-Files: I Want to Believe. He also reprised the role in the 2016 miniseries.

Pileggi's later work has included starring in the short-lived series Tarzan and co-starring with Barbara Hershey and Oliver Hudson in the short-lived series The Mountain. He played the recurring role of character Colonel Steven Caldwell, Commander of the Earth Battlecruiser, Daedalus, in the second (2005) and subsequent seasons of the television series Stargate Atlantis. He also appeared in an episode of CSI: Crime Scene Investigation and in 2006 had a regular guest role on Day Break as Robbery/Homicide Detective Spivak. Pileggi also appeared on the Cold Case episode "Offender", as a father accused of molesting and murdering his own son, who then threatens to murder one child sex offender per day until the case is reopened and solved. Pileggi also played the role of Larry Jennings, chairman of the board of the hospital, in Grey's Anatomy. In a first-season episode of That '70s Show he played Red Forman's swinger, navy buddy, Bull, alongside his real life wife, Arlene.

Pileggi appeared in two episodes of Law & Order: Special Victims Unit as DEA agent Jack Hammond. Since 2008, Pileggi has played Ernest Darby, the head of a white supremacist gang called the "Nordics", in the FX drama Sons of Anarchy. He also played spree killer Norman Hill (AKA The Road Warrior) on a season four episode of Criminal Minds, titled "Normal". Pileggi has also done some voice acting. His voice was featured as the githzerai Dak'kon in the video game Planescape: Torment. He voices Commissioner James Gordon on the Kids' WB series The Batman. Pileggi also hosted the Fox specials Breaking the Magician's Code: Magic's Biggest Secrets Finally Revealed and Conspiracy Theory: Did We Land on the Moon?. He also played the recurring role of Sam and Dean Winchester's maternal grandfather, Samuel Campbell, in the TV series Supernatural.

Pileggi starred in the TNT drama series Dallas as Harris Ryland. He was promoted to series regular in the second season.

As of 2014, Pileggi is on the advisory board of Sci-Fest, the first annual Los Angeles Science Fiction One-Act Play Festival, held in May 2014.

Since 2021, Pileggi has played Bonham Walker, the father of the titular Cordell Walker, in The CW crime drama series Walker reboot.

== Filmography ==
=== Films ===
Year	Title	Role	Notes
1982	Mongrel	Woody	
1987	Three O'Clock High	Duke Herman	
1987	Death Wish 4: The Crackdown	Cannery Lab Foreman	
1988	Return of the Living Dead Part II	Sergeant	
1989	Shocker	Horace Pinker	
1991	Guilty as Charged	Dominique	
1992	Basic Instinct	Internal Affairs Investigator	
1994	Dangerous Touch	Vince	
1994	It's Pat	Concert Guard #2	
1995	Vampire in Brooklyn	Tony 'The Hitman'	Uncredited
1998	The X-Files	Walter Skinner	
1998	Legion of Fire: Killer Ants!	Police Chief Jeff Croy	
2000	Gun Shy	DEA Agent Dexter Helvenshaw	
2007	Man in the Chair	Floyd	
2008	The X-Files: I Want to Believe	Walter Skinner	
2008	Flash of Genius	Macklin Tyler	
2010	Woodshop	Miller	
2015	The Girl in the Photographs	Sheriff Porter	
2017	Transformers: The Last Knight	TRF Group Leader	
2019	Polaroid	Sheriff Thomas Pembroke	
2021	American Traitor: The Trial of Axis Sally	John Kelley	
2022	Desert Shadows	Professor Charles M. Ridley	

=== Television ===
Year	Title	Role	Notes
1990	Dallas	Morrisey	4 episodes
1984	The Sky's No Limit	Jerry Morrow	Television film
1985	The A-Team	Paul Winkle	Episode: "The Road to Hope"
1987	Falcon Crest	Saunder's Henchman #2	2 episodes
1987	Downtown	Nick	Episode: "1.13"
1987	Hooperman	Large Biker	Episode: "Baby Talk"
1987	Ohara	Webster	Episode: "Hot Rocks"
1989	Dragnet	Bridgewater Hamilton	Episode: "Where's Sadie?"
1989	Alien Nation	John Paul Sartre	Episode: "The Night of the Screams"
1989	China Beach	E.O.D. Sergeant	Episode: "With a Little Help from My Friends"
1989	Falcon Crest	Eddie	Episode: "God of the Grape"
1990	Mancuso, FBI	Prisoner	Episode: "Death and Taxes"
1990	Hunter	Chuck Danko	Episode: "The Incident"
1990	Doctor Doctor	Coach	Episode: "Ice Follies"
1991	Knight Rider 2000	Thomas Watts	Television film
1991	Paradise	Rafe	Episode: "The Valley of Death"
1991	The Antagonists	Detective Haley	Episode: "Full Disclosure"
1991	Drexell's Class	Ex-Boyfriend	Episode: "Bully for Otis"
1992	Get a Life	Nax	Episode: "Chris' Brain Starts Working"
1992	Roc	White Officer	Episode: "Roc Works for Joey"
1994–2002, 2016–2018	The X-Files	Walter Skinner	91 episodes
1995	Pointman	Benny Dirkson	Episode: "My Momma's Back"
1995	Models Inc.	The Hit Man	Episode: "Sometimes a Great Commotion"
1997	Players	Jake Morgan	Episode: "Contact Sport"
1997–1998	Magic's Biggest Secrets Finally Revealed	Host	all episodes
1998	Walker, Texas Ranger	Paul Grady	Episode: "Money Talks"
1999	That '70s Show	'Bull'	Episode: "The Good Son"
2000	ER	Terry Waters	Episode: "Viable Options"
2000	Batman Beyond	Dr. Stanton	Voice, episode: "Payback"
2001	The Lone Gunmen	Walter Skinner	2 episodes
2002	Dharma & Greg	Himself	Episode: "The Tooth Is Out There"
2002	In Search Of...	Himself	8 episodes
2002	Birds of Prey	Al Hawke	Episode: "Nature of the Beast"
2003	Tarzan	Richard Clayton	9 episodes
2003–2005	Law & Order: Special Victims Unit	DEA Agent Jack Hammond	2 episodes
2004–2005	The Mountain	Colin Dowling	13 episodes
2005	Eyes	Robert Sutherland	Episode: "Whereabouts"
2005	The West Wing	Senator Dresden	Episode: "Mr. Frost"
2005	Nip/Tuck	Dr. Russell Marcus	Episode: "Sal Perri"
2005–2007	The Batman	Commissioner James Gordon	Voice, 13 episodes
2005–2009	Stargate Atlantis	Colonel Steven Caldwell	22 episodes
2006	CSI: Crime Scene Investigation	Harry 'Happy Harry' Desmond	Episode: "Daddy's Little Girl"
2006–2007	Day Break	Detective Spivak	12 episodes
2007	Cold Case	Mitch Hathaway	Episode: "Offender"
2007	Boston Legal	U.S. Attorney Mark Freestone	Episode: "Guantanamo by the Bay"
2007	Reaper	Detective Dan Stafford	Episode: "The Cop"
2007–2010	Grey's Anatomy	Larry Jennings	9 episodes
2008	Brothers & Sisters	Browne Carter	3 episodes
2008	Criminal Minds	Norman Hill	Episode: "Normal"
2008	Recount	Bill Daley	Television film
2008–2013	Sons of Anarchy	Ernest Darby	14 episodes
2008–2011	Supernatural	Samuel Campbell / Azazel	8 episodes
2008–2009	Magic's Biggest Secrets Finally Revealed	Narrator	13 episodes
2009	In Plain Sight	Al Dennison	Episode: "Rubble with a Cause"
2009–2010	Medium	Dan Burroughs	4 episodes
2010	Human Target	Leonard Kreese	Episode: "Lockdown"
2010	Castle	Hans Brauer	Episode: "A Deadly Game"
2011	Leverage	Colin Saunders	Episode: "The Hot Potato Job"
2012	The Finder	Eddie Ross	Episode: "Bullets"
2012–2014	Dallas	Harris Ryland	35 episodes
2015	Blue Bloods	Donald DeCarlo	Episode: "Sins of the Father"
2019	NCIS	Wynn Crawford	2 episodes
2019	American Horror Story: 1984	Art Sawyer	2 episodes
2019	Supergirl	Rama Khan	Recurring role
2019	The Rookie	Rex	Episode "The Night General"
2020	Helstrom	Papa	Episode: "Hell Storm"
2021–2024	Walker	Bonham Walker	56 episodes

=== Video games ===
Year	Title	Role	Notes
1998	The X-Files Game	Walter Skinner	
1999	Planescape: Torment	Dak'kon	
2004	The X-Files: Resist or Serve	Walter Skinner	

== Awards and nominations ==
Year	Association	Category	Nominated work	Result
1997	Screen Actors Guild Awards	Outstanding Performance by an Ensemble in a Drama Series	The X-Files	Nominated
1997	Viewers for Quality Television	Best Recurring Player	The X-Files	Nominated
1998	Screen Actors Guild Awards	Outstanding Performance by an Ensemble in a Drama Series	The X-Files	Nominated
1999	Screen Actors Guild Awards	Outstanding Performance by an Ensemble in a Drama Series	The X-Files	Nominated
