= Brenda Strong =

American actress (born 1960)

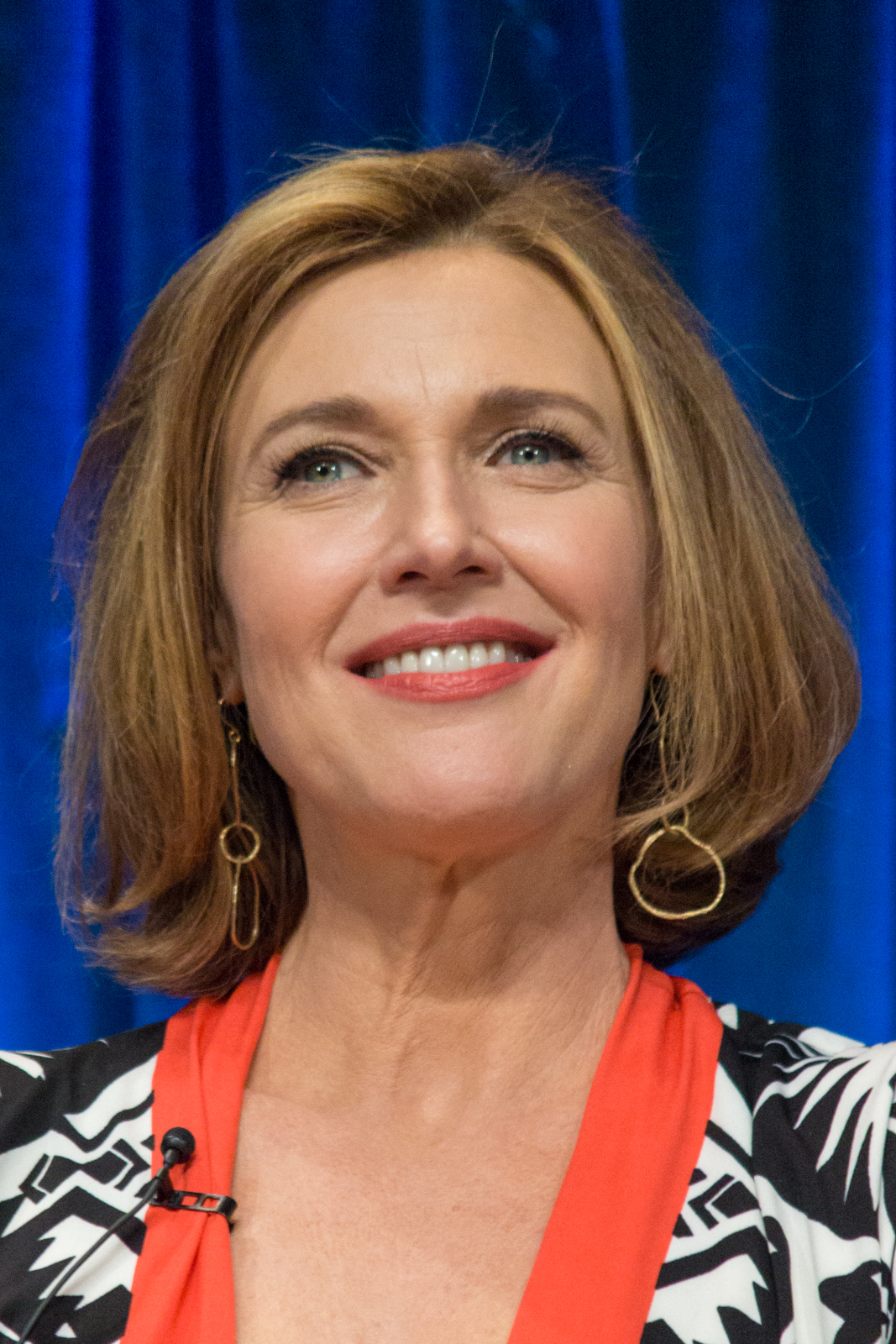
- Strong at the PaleyFest 2013 forum for Dallas
- Born: Brenda Lee Strong; March 25, 1960 (age 66); Portland, Oregon, U.S.
- Education: Arizona State University (BMus)
- Occupation: Actress
- Years active: 1985–present
- Title: Miss Arizona 1980
- Spouses: Tom Henri (m. 1989; div. 2011); John Farmanesh-Bocca (m. 2015)
- Children: 1

Brenda Lee Strong (born March 25, 1960) is an American actress. She began her career in television, including guest starring appearances in Twin Peaks, Party of Five, Seinfeld, Scandal, Star Trek: The Next Generation, Blossom and Sports Night. She also starred as Mary Alice Young on Desperate Housewives (2004–12).

Strong had supporting roles in a number of films, including Starship Troopers (1997), Black Dog (1998), The Deep End of the Ocean (1999), Starship Troopers 2: Hero of the Federation (2004) and The Work and the Glory (2004). She is best known for her role as Mary Alice Young in the ABC television comedy-drama series Desperate Housewives (2004–2012), for which she was nominated for two Emmy Awards. Strong later starred as Ann Ewing in the TNT prime time soap opera Dallas (2012–14).

In 2016, she guest starred as Queen Nia in The 100, and undertook a recurring role as Lillian Luthor on Supergirl. Strong appeared as a recurring character in the second season of the Netflix Original 13 Reasons Why. In September 2018, Strong was promoted to series regular for its third season. She directed two episodes in season four.

== Early life ==
Strong was born in Portland, Oregon, and graduated from Sandy High School in 1978.

Strong was crowned Miss Arizona in 1980. She earned a Bachelor of Music degree from Arizona State University, where she graduated magna cum laude.

== Career ==
=== Early work ===
Her first break after college was a spot in Billy Crystal's 1984 music video "You Look Marvelous". Her first television appearances came in 1985 with brief stints on St. Elsewhere, MacGyver, and Cheers. She also made guest appearances on Shadow Chasers, Hotel, Star Trek: The Next Generation, Matlock, Murphy Brown, Herman's Head, and Blossom. In 1990, she had a recurring role in the ABC series Twin Peaks. She made her film debut in 1986 comedy film Weekend Warriors before having a supporting part in Spaceballs (1987).

In 1992, Strong starred in the CBS sitcom Scorch. She spent the following decade playing recurring and guest starring roles in many dramatic and comedic shows. From 1996 to 1998, she appeared as Elaine's nemesis Sue Ellen Mischke, the "bra-less wonder" and "Oh Henry!" candy bar heiress, on several episodes of NBC sitcom Seinfeld. She also had recurring roles on Party of Five, 7th Heaven and Everwood and guest starred on 3rd Rock from the Sun, ER, Picket Fences, Silk Stalkings, Dawson's Creek, Any Day Now, Ally McBeal, CSI: Crime Scene Investigation and Nip/Tuck.

From 1998 to 2000, she played Sally Sasser, the nemesis of Felicity Huffman's Dana Whitaker, in the ABC comedy-drama Sports Night. In early 2004, she starred as wealthy Arlene Ridgeway in The WB short-lived sitcom, The Help.

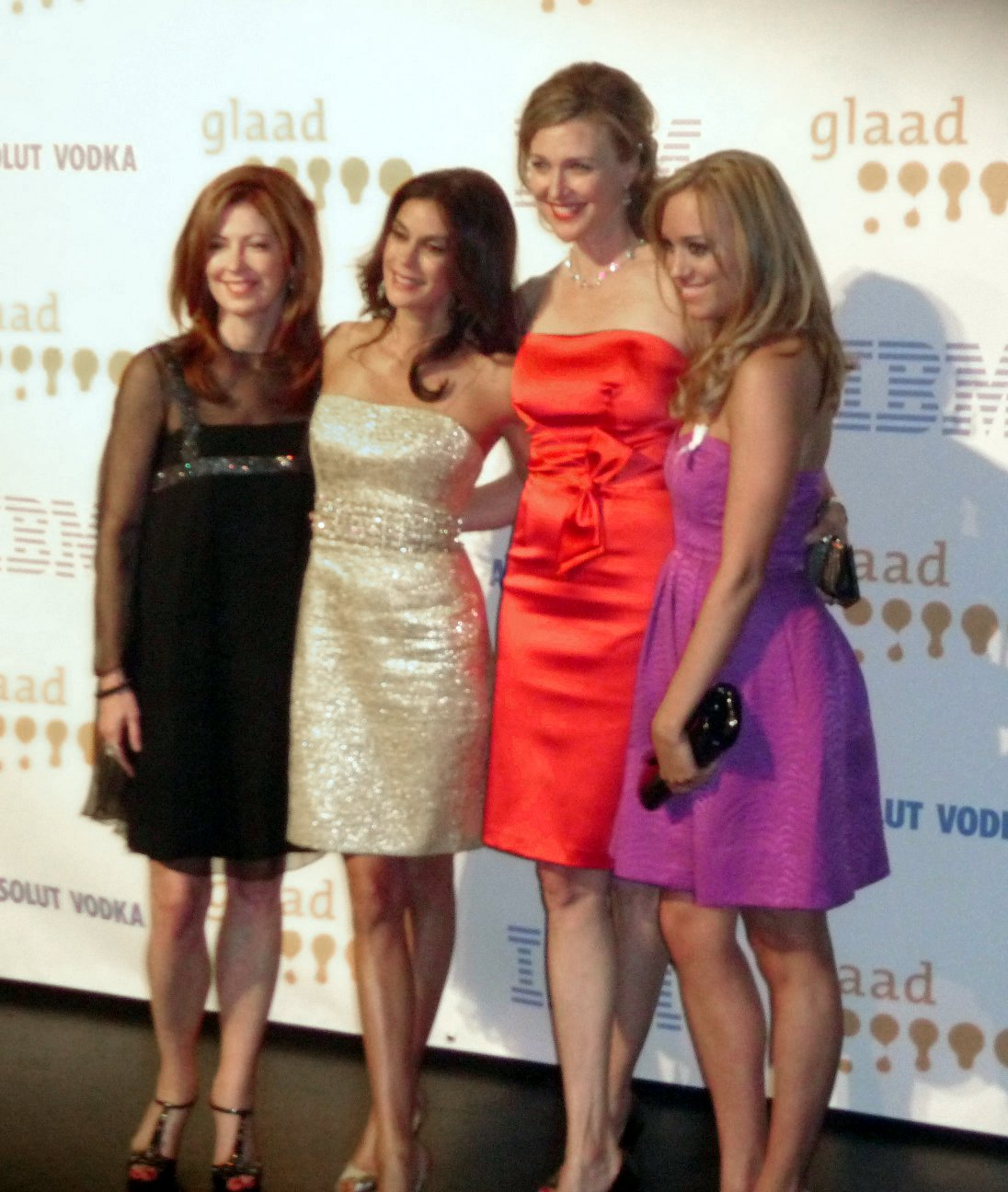
Dana Delany, Teri Hatcher, Strong and Andrea Bowen at the 2009 GLAAD Media Awards

Strong had roles in a number of films, including My Life, Malice, and The Craft before being cast as Captain Deladier in the 1997 science fiction action film Starship Troopers. Her character died in the original film, but she returned in a different role as Sergeant Dede Rake in the second film, Starship Troopers 2: Hero of the Federation. In 1998, she starred opposite Patrick Swayze in the action film Black Dog, playing his wife. The following year, she played Michelle Pfeiffer's character's best friend in the drama film The Deep End of the Ocean. In 2000, she appeared in the horror anthology Terror Tract and, in 2002, had a short part in Red Dragon.

=== 2004–2012: Desperate Housewives ===
Strong starred, mostly off-screen, on Desperate Housewives, opposite Felicity Huffman, Marcia Cross, Eva Longoria and Teri Hatcher during the show's run from 2004 to 2012. She played the deceased Mary Alice Young, who narrates the events of her friends' and neighbors' lives from beyond the grave. Her narrations yielded Emmy Award nomination, for Outstanding Voice-Over Performance, in 2011 and 2012. Along with the cast, she received two Screen Actors Guild Award for Outstanding Performance by an Ensemble in a Comedy Series in 2005 and 2006. Strong's character narrated all but two episodes of the series. One of the two exceptions is the season 3 episode narrated by Steven Culp, after his character, Rex Van de Kamp, is killed by George Williams and he observes the lives of the men on the street. The other episode is during season 5 and is narrated by Nicollette Sheridan, in which her character, Edie Britt, dies of a car crash, followed by electrocution.

Strong has appeared several times in flashbacks and in a dream episode in which Lynette struggles to understand why she could not stop Mary Alice's suicide. She played another deceased wife on the television series Everwood, appearing mainly in flashback sequences as the late Julia Brown. Coincidentally, Housewives co-star Marcia Cross played Dr. Linda Abbott, a love interest for Brown's widower, during the second season of Everwood. Both Strong and Cross appear in season 9 of Seinfeld (episodes 9 and 8 respectively).

In addition to her role on Desperate Housewives, Strong starred as Mary Ann Steed in the movie trilogy The Work and the Glory, based on a bestselling series of the same name by Gerald N. Lund. She starred in the 2006 Lifetime movie Family in Hiding. Also in 2006, she played Ted Danson's love interest in the short-lived ABC comedy series Help Me Help You. She also guest starred on Curb Your Enthusiasm as a love interest of Larry David, Law & Order: Criminal Intent, Boston Legal, and Rizzoli & Isles.

=== 2012–2014: Dallas ===
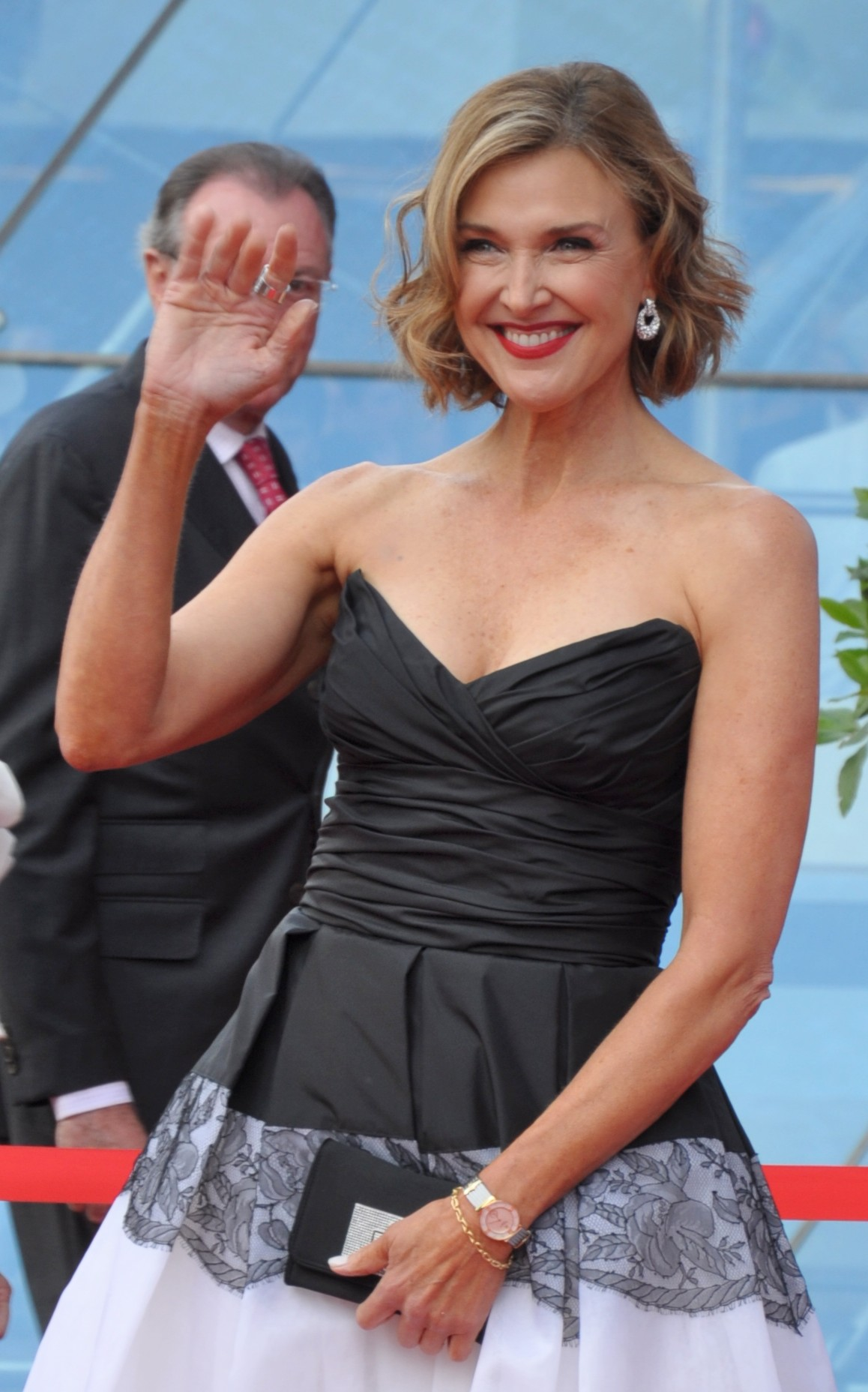
Strong at the 2013 Monte-Carlo Television Festival

During her final year on Desperate Housewives, Strong signed on to play Ann Ewing, the third wife of Bobby Ewing (Patrick Duffy) and new matriarch of Southfork Ranch, in the TNT series Dallas, the revival of long-running CBS prime time soap opera of the same name. Strong previously made a guest appearance in the original series in 1987 as Cliff's one night stand. The show premiered on June 13, 2012, and was cancelled after three seasons in 2014. During her Dallas years, she began hosting Investigation Discovery series Blood Relatives and played Joan Reston, the wife of Governor Samuel Reston, in two episodes of Shonda Rhimes' political series Scandal.

=== 2015–present ===
After Dallas, Strong appeared in an episode of NBC comedy procedural The Mysteries of Laura. In 2015, she joined the cast of the third season of The CW post-apocalyptic drama series The 100, playing the role of Nia, Queen of the Ice Nation. In 2016, Strong had a recurring role on season 2 of Fear the Walking Dead. Later she joined the cast of The CW series Supergirl a recurring role as Lillian Luthor.

In 2018, Strong appeared in the second season of Netflix series 13 Reasons Why. In 2018, Strong was promoted to series regular status for its third season.

== Personal life ==
A certified yoga instructor and fertility expert, Strong has taught at UCLA's Mind/Body Institute and received an honorary Doctorate of Science for her work regarding yoga and fertility from Yo San University.

Strong married Tom Henri in July 1989; they have a son. She filed for divorce on January 14, 2011. In May 2015, she married director-actor John Farmanesh-Bocca.

In 2019, she won the Best First Time Filmmaker Award at the GI Film Festival San Diego for her directorial debut #3 Normandy Lane.

== Filmography ==
=== Film ===
Year	Title	Role	Notes
1986	Weekend Warriors	Danielle	—N/a
1987	Spaceballs	Nurse Gretchen	—N/a
1989	Skin Deep	Real Estate Agent	Uncredited
1993	My Life	Laura	—N/a
1993	Malice	Claudia	—N/a
1996	The Craft	Doctor	—N/a
1997	Starship Troopers	Captain Deladier	—N/a
1998	Get a Job	Emily LaCrosse	—N/a
1998	Black Dog	Melanie	—N/a
1998	Undercurrent	Renee Rivera	—N/a
1999	The Deep End of the Ocean	Ellen	—N/a
2000	Terror Tract	Dr. Helen Corey	—N/a
2002	Teddy Bears' Picnic	Jackie Sloane Chevron	—N/a
2002	Red Dragon	Dinner Guest	—N/a
2003	Missing Brendan	Joyce Calden	—N/a
2003	Exposed	Susan Andrews	—N/a
2004	Starship Troopers 2: Hero of the Federation	Sergeant Dede Rake	—N/a
2004	The Work and the Glory	Mary Ann Steed	—N/a
2005	The Kid & I	Bonnie Roman	—N/a
2007	A Plumm Summer	Viv	—N/a
2008	Ocean of Pearls	Mary Stewart	—N/a
2009	You	Paula	—N/a
2010	Privileged	Mrs. Carrington	—N/a
2012	An Engagement	Mom	Short film
2014	Teacher of the Year	Ellen Behr	—N/a
2014	I Can See You	Marnie	Short film
2015	The Leisure Class	Charlotte	—N/a
2019	#3 Normandy Lane	Director	Short film

=== Television ===
Year	Title	Role	Notes
1985	St. Elsewhere	Nadine Aurora	Episode: "The Naked and the Dead"
1985	Misfits of Science	Miss Speedway	Episode: "Twin Engines"
1985	Shadow Chasers	Angela Taylor	Episode: "The Many Lies of Johnathan"
1986	MacGyver	Lila	Episode: "The Assassin"
1986	Cheers	Vicki	Episode: "The Cape Cad"
1986	Sledge Hammer!	Miss Hotchkins	Episode: "Miss of the Spiderwoman"
1987	Dallas	Cliff's One Night Stand	Episode: "Cat and Mouse"
1987	Hotel	Hilary Sinclair	Episode: "Revelations"
1987	Kenny Rogers as The Gambler, Part III: The Legend Continues	Desiree	Television film
1988	Star Trek: The Next Generation	Rashella	Episode: "When the Bough Breaks"
1989	Midnight Caller	Kristen	Episode: "No Exit"
1989	Hooperman	Nun	Episode: "The Nun and I"
1989	Matlock	Jan Sinclair	Episode: "The Model"
1990	Father Dowling Mysteries	Miss Cantrell/O'Grady	Episode: "The Perfect Cover Mystery"
1990	People Like Us	Brenda Primrose	Television film
1991	Anything but Love	Unknown	Episode: "My New Best Friend"
1991	Twin Peaks	Jones	4 episodes
1991	Murphy Brown	Janine	Episode: "Eldin Inmates Life"
1991–1992	Blossom	Diane	2 episodes
1992	Rachel Gunn, R.N.	Sheila	Episode: "I Dream of Squidhead"
1992	Scorch	Allison King	Series regular, 6 episodes
1992	Sibs	Naomi	Episode: "Warren and the Married Woman"
1992	Down the Shore	Eileen	Episode: "Turn of the Screw"
1992	Grapevine	Allison	Episode: "The Allison and Ken Story"
1992	Dark Justice	Jessica Sadler	Episode: "Happy Mothers Day"
1992	Stepfather III	Lauren Sutliffe	Television film
1992–1993	Herman's Head	Dr. Holland	2 episodes
1993	The Young Indiana Jones Chronicles	Beatrice Kaufman	Episode: "Young Indian Jones and the Scandal of 1920"
1993	The Second Half	Heather	Episode: "Guess Who's Channeling Dinner?"
1993	Picket Fences	Sarah Evans	Episode: "Unlawful Entries"
1993	Silk Stalkings	Candy Grayson	Episode: "Ladies Night Out"
1994	Island City	Dr. Sammy Helding	Television pilot (not greenlit)
1994	ER	Sally Niemeyer	Episode: "Into that Good Night"
1996	Murphy Brown	Tara Baker	Episode: "Casa Nova"
1996	The John Larroquette Show	Christine Taylor	Episode: "The Master Class"
1996	Party of Five	Kathleen Isley	6 episodes
1996–1997	3rd Rock from the Sun	Miss Frost	2 episodes
1996–1997	Seinfeld	Sue Ellen Mischke	4 episodes
1997	Roar	Megan	Episode: "Traps"
1997	Chicago Sons	Nina	Episode: "Infrequent Flyers"
1998–2000	Sports Night	Sally Sasser	7 episodes
1998	The Closer	Susan Bend	Episode: "The Rebound"
1999	Odd Man Out	Kasey Morton	Episode: "Good Will Hunting"
1999	Any Day Now	Jana Durham	Episode: "It's Not You, It's Me"
1999	Safe Harbor	Marilyn Conray	Episode: "Older Women, Younger Men"
2000	Get Real	Olivia Clark	Episode: "Guilt"
2000	The Michael Richards Show	Beth	Episode: "Discrimination"
2000–2002	7th Heaven	Mrs. Carmen Mackoul	8 episodes
2001	Ally McBeal	Jerry Hill	Episode: "Mr. Bo"
2001	CSI: Crime Scene Investigation	Dr. Leigh Sapien	Episode: "Overload"
2001	Thieves	Loretta	Episode: "Liver Let Die"
2001	Gilmore Girls	Eva	Episode: "Like Mother, Like Daughter"
2001	Dawson's Creek	Kay Liddell	Episode: "High Anxiety"
2002	Bram & Alice	Theresa	Episode: "Scribbling Rivalry"
2002	The Court	Marsha Palmer	4 episodes
2002	Malcolm in the Middle	Amelia	Episode: "Family Reunion"
2002–2005	Everwood	Julia Brown	5 episodes
2003	A.U.S.A.	Judge Kimberly Flynn	Episode: "The Joint Report...A Love Story"
2003	Nip/Tuck	Iris	2 episodes
2003	The Lyon's Den	Rebecca McCandless	Episode: "Things She Said"
2004	The Help	Arlene Ridgeway	Series regular, 7 episodes
2004	Going to the Mat	Patty Newfield	Television film
2004–2012	Desperate Housewives	Mary Alice Young	Series regular, 179 episodes Screen Actors Guild Award for Outstanding Performance by an Ensemble in a Comedy Series (2005–2006); Nominated—Screen Actors Guild Award for Outstanding Performance by an Ensemble in a Comedy Series (2007–2009); Nominated—Primetime Emmy Award for Outstanding Voice-Over Performance (2011–2012)
2005	The Work and the Glory II: American Zion	Mary Ann Steed	Television film
2006	Family in Hiding	Carol Peterson	Television film
2006	Just Legal	Liza Lynch	Episode: "The Bar"
2006	The Work and the Glory III: A House Divided	Mary Ann Steed	Television film
2006–2007	Help Me Help You	Linda	4 episodes
2007	Curb Your Enthusiasm	Dr. Flomm	Episode: "The N Word"
2007	Shark	Olivia Hartnell	Episode: "In Absentia"
2008	Law & Order: Criminal Intent	Kathy Jarrow	Episode: "Betrayed"
2008	Boston Legal	Judge Judy Beacon	Episode: "True Love"
2010	Scoundrels	Penny Priest	Episode: "Birds of a Feather Flock Together"
2010	Rizzoli & Isles	Mel Gaynor-Randle	Episode: "I Kissed a Girl"
2012–2014	Dallas	Ann Ewing	Series regular, 40 episodes
2012–2014	Scandal	Joan Reston	Episodes: "All Roads Lead to Fitz", "The Fluffer"
2012–2015	Blood Relatives	Narrator	32 episodes
2014	The Mysteries of Laura	Margot Preston	Episode: "The Mystery of the Mobile Murder"
2015	Bones	Senator Hayley Winters	Episode: "The Senator in the Street Sweeper"
2015	Ice Sculpture Christmas	Chef Gloria	Television film
2016	Chicago P.D.	Attorney Green	Episode: "Now I'm God"
2016	Love by Chance	Helen	Television film (Hallmark)
2016	Notorious	Maggie Sherman	Episode: "Missing"
2016–2017	Fear the Walking Dead	Ilene Stowe	4 episodes
2016; 2019	The 100	Queen Nia	4 episodes
2016–2021	Supergirl	Lillian Luthor	23 episodes
2018–2020	13 Reasons Why	Nora Walker	21 episodes; Also director (season 4)
2020	All Rise	Jean Ruberstone-Frost	Episode: "My Fair Lockdown"
2023	Unprisoned	Nadine Gregory	10 episodes
2023	Sweeter Than Chocolate	Helen Sweet	TV Movie (Hallmark)
2026	Chicago Med	Dr. Suzie Mankiewicz	Episodes: "Our So-Called Lives", "Altered States"
2026	Rooster	Joanie	Episodes: "Angry, Like An Angry Person", "Cop Hawk"
2026	Marshals	Samantha Clarkson	Episodes: "Playing with Fire"

=== Video game ===
Year	Title	Role
2006	Desperate Housewives: The Game	Mary Alice Young
