= List of Dallas (2012 TV series) episodes =

Dallas is an American prime time television soap opera that follows the wealthy Ewings, a family of oil and cattle ranch industrialists in Dallas, Texas. Cynthia Cidre developed the 2012 continuation of the 1978 series of the same name, created by David Jacobs, that picks up twenty years after the series ended in 1991. The continuation series premiered on TNT on June 13, 2012, and stars Jesse Metcalfe, Josh Henderson, Jordana Brewster, Julie Gonzalo, Brenda Strong, Patrick Duffy, and Linda Gray, with Larry Hagman.

Upon its cancellation in October 2014, the Dallas continuation series had aired for three seasons and forty episodes.

== Series overview ==
Season	Episodes	Originally released	
Season	Episodes	First released	Last released
1	10	June 13, 2012	August 8, 2012
2	15	January 28, 2013	April 15, 2013
3	15	February 24, 2014	September 22, 2014

== Episodes ==
=== Season 1 (2012) ===
No. overall	No. in season	Title	Directed by	Written by	Original release date	Prod. code	US viewers (millions)
1	1	"Changing of the Guard"	Michael M. Robin	Cynthia Cidre	June 13, 2012	296021	6.86
At Southfork Ranch, the family gathers for the wedding of Christopher Ewing, adopted son of Bobby Ewing. A past rivalry between Bobby and J.R. crosses to the next generation of Ewing men – Christopher and John Ross – which tempts Bobby to sell Southfork. Bobby discovers he has cancer and hides it from his family but Anne finds out after stumbling upon his medication. Elena's feelings for Christopher return. Both Christopher and John Ross begin working on different energy projects.
2	2	"Hedging Your Bets"	Michael M. Robin	Cynthia Cidre	June 13, 2012	2M5801	6.86
Christopher and Elena have to bury feelings to work together. J.R. uncovers John Ross' plan. Bobby and Ann deal with the news about his cancer. Elena and John Ross break up after she thinks he sent the email that broke up Christopher and her. Christopher's bride Rebecca and her brother Tommy are secretly using the Ewings for their money.
3	3	"The Price You Pay"	Michael M. Robin	Bruce Rasmussen	June 20, 2012	2M5802	4.76
John Ross wants to impress his father. J.R. decides to move back to Southfork. Cliff Barnes comes back and tries to connect with his nephew. Rebecca has trouble betraying Christopher. Christopher and Elena kiss after Christopher finds out Bobby has cancer. Bobby and Ann get more bad news about his cancer. In the end, John Ross finds out that Rebecca sent Elena the email that destroyed Elena's relationship with Christopher.
4	4	"The Last Hurrah"	Marc Roskin	Taylor Hamra	June 27, 2012	2M5803	4.08
Bobby and Ann plan a last barbecue at Southfork before moving. John Ross blackmails Rebecca into completing a difficult task for him. Christopher opens up to Bobby about his difficulty choosing between Elena and Rebecca. J.R. plans on cutting John Ross out of their deal, while Sue Ellen meets with Cliff Barnes, much to J.R.'s disapproval.
5	5	"Truth and Consequences"	Randy Zisk	Robert Rovner	July 4, 2012	2M5804	3.36
Rebecca tells Christopher that Tommy sent the email to Elena. Christopher doesn't want to see Rebecca, so she tries to make peace with Ann first. Elena and John Ross reunite when he swears he had nothing to do with the deed. Bobby and Ann are trying to overrule the deed by proving that J.R. was part of it. J.R. leaves town and puts his son in charge. Christopher uses a sex tape to blackmail John Ross into helping get Southfork back. Dallas Cowboys owner Jerry Jones makes a cameo appearance as himself.
6	6	"The Enemy of My Enemy"	Jesse Bochco	Gail Gilchriest	July 11, 2012	2M5805	3.63
Bobby and Christopher find a way to stop the drilling of oil on Southfork, thanks to Rebecca. Ann receives a heartbreaking present from her ex, which drives Bobby to the edge. J.R. tries to get into Cliff Barnes' poker game. John Ross enlists the help of Sue Ellen. John Ross receives a surprise from Veronica, which makes him fear for Elena's safety. Rebecca finds out some life-changing news.
7	7	"Collateral Damage"	Steve Robin	Aaron Allen	July 18, 2012	2M5806	3.88
Bobby is arrested for assaulting Harris Ryland, who later asks for an apology. Christopher demands a paternity test when Elena tells him that Rebecca is pregnant. Ann is hiding a secret from Bobby. Sue Ellen tells Elena to pick a side. J.R discovers news about Cliff's driver, Frank. After Veronica becomes an increasing threat, John Ross sells her out to Vicente, resulting in her death. He is later arrested for her murder.
8	8	"No Good Deed"	Michael Katleman	Julia Cohen	July 25, 2012	2M5807	3.25
Christopher has a background check performed on Rebecca; it comes back clean. John Ross is beaten up by Vicente's men in prison and is sent to the hospital. To help John Ross, Sue Ellen bribes the medical examiner, which may cause trouble. J.R. visits John Ross while he sleeps. Christopher makes a deal with Vicente over his project. Rebecca is brought back into Tommy's plans when Tommy threatens to tell Christopher that he is not Rebecca's brother, and maybe more.
9	9	"Family Business"	Steve Robin	Bruce Rasmussen	August 1, 2012	2M5808	3.24
J.R. returns to Southfork after John Ross is released. Bobby is incapacitated by a cerebral aneurysm. Sue Ellen's campaign for Governor of Texas is placed in serious jeopardy when Harris Ryland finds out she bribed the medical examiner to help John Ross. Frank Ashkani is revealed to be the man behind Tommy's plans to steal technology from Christopher. Christopher and John Ross seemingly decide to bury the hatchet and go into business together, forming Ewing Energies with Bobby and Elena as their partners. Lou has information on faux Marta. Rebecca and Tommy have a confrontation.
10	10	"Revelations"	Michael M. Robin	Story by : Cynthia Cidre and Robert Rovner; Teleplay by : Robert Rovner	August 8, 2012	2M5809	4.29
Bobby is released from the hospital after a close call, and plots with Christopher, J.R. and John Ross to stop Vicente. Meanwhile, John Ross proposes to Elena and she accepts. After killing Tommy in self-defense, Rebecca gets help disposing of Tommy's body, and starts fresh with Christopher. Ann comes up with a plan to stop Harris Ryland from blackmailing Sue Ellen. Elena and Christopher break up with, respectively, John Ross and Rebecca, after finding out that they lied, and later Christopher and Elena reunite passionately. Rebecca is revealed to be Cliff Barnes' daughter, Pamela Rebecca, who is working with him to destroy the Ewings. A hell-bent John Ross teams up with J.R. against Christopher and Elena.

=== Season 2 (2013) ===
No. overall	No. in season	Title	Directed by	Written by	Original release date	Prod. code	US viewers (millions)
11	1	"Battle Lines"	Michael M. Robin	Cynthia Cidre & Robert Rovner	January 28, 2013	2M6151	2.98
Christopher seeks to gain the upper hand in his divorce from Rebecca Sutter, but a revelation turns everything on its head, causing the entire family to put their differences aside and rally together - except for John Ross, who uses J.R.'s dirty tricks to take revenge on Christopher and Elena. Meanwhile, Harris Ryland blackmails Ann, forcing her and Bobby to confront a shocking secret from her past. The medical examiner comes forward that Sue Ellen bribed him, ending her Governor bid.
12	2	"Venomous Creatures"	Steve Robin	Aaron Allen	January 28, 2013	2M6152	2.98
Bobby discovers Ryland kidnapped Emma, raised her with his mother, and manipulated her into hating Ann. Sue Ellen is tempted to drink. The real Rebecca wants Pamela to honor her part of their deal by revealing where Tommy is, but Pamela pays her extra to leave town. Christopher receives Tommy's cellphone, which contains two shocking voice messages. Rivalry brews between Frank and Pamela. John Ross and Pamela strike a deal to destroy Christopher and Elena, and they later sleep together.
13	3	"Sins of the Father"	Jesse Bochco	Bruce Rasmussen	February 4, 2013	2M6153	2.23
Evidence points to foul play in Tommy's disappearance. Christopher tries to connect Pamela to a crime. J.R. and John Ross try to poison one family member against another. Elena's brother Drew returns to Southfork to finish what their father started and drill for oil in their family's land. Ann reaches her breaking point with Ryland and exacts revenge in a deadly way. She shoots Ryland.
14	4	"False Confessions"	Stephen Herek	Taylor Hamra	February 11, 2013	2M6154	2.41
Dallas Police arrive at Southfork and Bobby confesses to shooting Ryland to protect Ann. Drew fires Elena's drilling foreman after it is discovered that he drilled at the wrong angle. Tommy Sutter's corpse turns up and Pamela is named as a person of interest in a Dallas P.D. homicide investigation. However, it is Frank who is arrested for the crime. He pleads guilty in court, then swallows what appears to be a cyanide pill at his arraignment. John Ross meets Cliff Barnes to warn him that J.R. and Frank are conspiring against Pamela.
15	5	"Trial and Error"	Millicent Shelton	John Whelpley	February 18, 2013	2M6155	2.51
Ann confesses to shooting Ryland and presents evidence to the police, and a month later goes to trial. Sue Ellen asks J.R. to forgive John Ross for betraying him to Cliff Barnes. Drew is arrested for transporting stolen goods, albeit unknowingly. Ann is found guilty of attempted murder. In the courthouse, Bobby is met by Vicente Cano who is facing an extradition hearing. Christopher decides to change his tactics with regard to Pamela.
16	6	"Blame Game"	Jesse Bochco	Gail Gilchriest	February 25, 2013	2M6156	2.55
John Ross tries to persuade his mother to join him in his bid to take over Ewing Energies, which puts her at odds with Elena. Christopher makes a shocking discovery that could transform the fate of the company. J.R. fools Bobby. Ann gets probation for attempted murder. Emma is conflicted about her feelings for her mother. The Ewings unite against Vicente when he holds the family hostage and tries to get away with Christopher's methane clathrate patent.
17	7	"The Furious and the Fast"	Rodney Charters	Julia Cohen	March 4, 2013	2M6157	2.79
J.R. is in Abu Dhabi securing oil leases. Bobby decides to fight Sue Ellen and John Ross to regain control of Ewing Energies with the help of his brother Gary. Ryland and his mother try to force Emma's hand and send her back to England. Elena decides to go into business with Drew. Pamela delays her decision on who she will align herself with until Christopher can test his methane-powered car, as he is trying to win a fuel services contract with the city with the help of former NASCAR driver Ricky Rudd. John Ross' phone call with J.R. is interrupted by two gunshots on the other end.
18	8	"J.R.'s Masterpiece"	Michael M. Robin	Cynthia Cidre	March 11, 2013	2M6158	3.56
Ray, Gary, and Lucy return to Dallas, and friends and foes alike gather for J.R.'s memorial at the Dallas Petroleum Club which is disrupted by Cliff Barnes. John Ross and Emma have sex in his car. Later, at the funeral at Southfork, each family member, except John Ross, speaks their farewell to J.R. Sue Ellen admits to turning back to the bottle after spending the night in J.R.'s old room and then reads the final letter that J.R. wrote to her. Meanwhile, John Ross is looking for answers about J.R.'s death and what he was doing in Mexico. Bobby lashes out at Ann about her keeping secrets from him. Bum appears after the funeral service with a box containing items for Christopher, John Ross, and Bobby.
19	9	"Ewings Unite!"	Steve Robin	Bruce Rasmussen	March 18, 2013	2M6159	2.67
J.R.'s will is read and half his mineral rights are left to Sue Ellen. Also, a letter from Miss Ellie, directed to be opened after J.R.'s death, expresses her wish that Bobby give John Ross a half-share of Southfork. Bobby sells the plot of land formerly belonging to the Ramos family back to Elena and Drew. Bobby, Christopher, and John Ross meet to discuss J.R.'s "Masterpiece." Valene makes a surprise return to Dallas at the behest of Sue Ellen. Harris Ryland and Cliff Barnes join forces and swear vengeance on the Ewings. Drew is blackmailed into sabotaging Christopher's offshore methane rig. The head of DCT is caught in a compromising position with John Ross after Barnes Global undercuts Christopher on the bid for the fuel services contract with the city, placing her political future in serious jeopardy. Christopher then blackmails her into giving him another chance at the contract. While Christopher is giving a tour of the rig, an incendiary device triggers an explosion, which could jeopardize his chances at the contract.
20	10	"Guilt & Innocence"	Jesse Bochco	Robert Rovner	March 25, 2013	2M6160	2.61
In the aftermath of the explosion aboard Christopher's rig, most suffer only cuts and bruises, but Pamela and her babies are left fighting for their lives. At the hospital, Pamela makes Christopher promise that the babies will be saved if her life ends up hanging in the balance. Bobby forgives Ann for her deception regarding Emma. Harris Ryland's mother suffers a broken leg after falling down the stairs at the Ryland mansion. She then tries to create a divide between Emma and Harris. Pamela's mother, Afton Cooper, makes a surprise return to Dallas and blames Christopher for what happened on the rig. An initial investigation places the blame on Christopher. Pamela miscarries her and Christopher's babies. Drew and Emma become closer and she talks him out of leaving town. Ken Richards (Lee Majors), an old flame, re-enters Sue Ellen's life. John Ross and Sue Ellen agree with Bobby that the family needs to present a united front in figuring out what happened on the rig. Bobby receives news on the possible whereabouts of his ex-wife Pam.
21	11	"Let Me In"	Millicent Shelton	Aaron Allen	April 1, 2013	2M6161	2.60
The T.E.S.H.A. investigation concludes and heavy fines are levied against the Ewings. Christopher is furious and confronts Ken Richards in a bar. John Ross goes to Pamela's condo to check on her and finds her in a drug-induced stupor. Drew is starting to have an attack of conscience about what happened on the rig. He makes a date with Emma but doesn't show because he is beaten up by Harris Ryland's thugs. Elena finds Drew at their drilling site and he tells her that Ryland had him beaten up, but he swears her to secrecy. Carlos Del Sol reveals that J.R. had Harris Ryland linked to narcotics trafficking. Sue Ellen gives Richards an ultimatum, telling him to choose a side. Later, she receives a list of Governor McConaughey's contributors showing Harris Ryland as one of the biggest. John Ross copies Rebecca Wentworth's will from Pamela's computer, and it reveals that one-third of Barnes Global would go to Christopher if his mother Pam does not turn up. The Henderson land (where Elena was drilling) is seized by the state in the process of Eminent Domain.
22	12	"A Call to Arms"	Ken Topolsky	Gail Gilchriest & Julia Cohen	April 8, 2013	2M6162	1.94
As Ewing Energies is on the verge of collapse at the hands of Harris Ryland and Cliff Barnes, the Ewings fight back with "J.R.'s Masterpiece". Ann finds drugs in Emma's dresser drawer, and Emma and Sue Ellen offer conflicting accounts to Ann about what happened when Sue Ellen saw Emma in a bar. After seeing what her father did to Drew, Emma decides to end her relationship with Drew and then obtains prescription painkillers from a Southfork ranch-hand in exchange for sexual favors. Sheriff Derrick keeps an eye on Harris Ryland's trucks as a favor to Bobby. After finding out that her father was responsible for the death of her babies, Pamela has to choose where to place her loyalties. Christopher closes in on the search for his mother, Pam Ewing.
23	13	"Love & Family"	Randy Zisk	John Whelpley	April 8, 2013	2M6163	2.44
Pamela allies herself with John Ross, but Christopher's doubts about her make him question her true allegiance. Pamela demands and gets one-third of Barnes Global from her father and then she marries John Ross. Drew shares a startling secret powerful enough to destroy Pamela's relationship with Christopher and then becomes a fugitive from justice. Elena goes to Bobby about Drew's role in the sabotage of the Ewing methane rig. Christopher and Elena head off to Zurich, Switzerland to try to find his mother. The conflict between Cliff Barnes and Bobby escalates, and Bobby tries to get help from his ex-wife Pam. Emma spirals deeper into drug addiction and she is pulled over for driving under the influence and hauled off to jail. Cliff arrives to take possession of Ewing Energies, but is reminded by Bobby that the battle is not over yet.
24	14	"Guilt by Association"	Jesse Bochco	Taylor Hamra	April 15, 2013	2M6164	2.82
In Zurich, Switzerland, Christopher and Elena continue the search for Christopher's mother, Pam, which leads to Christopher discovering Pam's husband, who tells him that Pam never wants to see Christopher again. Christopher finds out about Elena's contact with Drew and angrily tells her to leave. Sue Ellen tracks down Ken Richards and demands that he get proof of the governor's involvement with the TESHA cover-up. John Ross and Pamela discover that Cliff's plane was in Nuevo Laredo the night J.R. was killed, convincing John Ross that Cliff killed J.R. Drew sets a trap for Roy Vikars who ends up being arrested for possession of narcotics. Bobby decides to put the last part of "J.R.'s Masterpiece" in motion.
25	15	"Legacies"	Steve Robin	Cynthia Cidre & Robert Rovner	April 15, 2013	2M6165	2.99
J.R.'s body is exhumed, and two shell casings are removed from his chest cavity. Evidence is planted by the Ewings to frame Cliff for J.R.'s murder, and Cliff is arrested in Nuevo Laredo. Harris Ryland is arrested in Dallas on drugs charges. Cliff reveals to Elena that years back J.R. had switched land deeds to cheat Elena's father out of oil-rich land while the Ewings made millions of dollars. Elena seeks help to avenge her father from someone from her past. When Cliff is arrested, Christopher tells him that he has inherited his mother's share of Barnes Global, and with John Ross and Pamela also owning one-third of Barnes Global, that means that Cliff is now the minority shareholder in his own company. Bum reveals that, with J.R. having only a few days left to live, due to cancer, he shot J.R., because J.R. asked him to do it. John Ross has a passionate encounter with Emma who has set up her father on drug charges.

=== Season 3 (2014) ===
On April 30, 2013, TNT renewed Dallas for a 15-episode third season. The first eight episodes of season 3 were broadcast from February 24, 2014 to April with the remaining seven from August 18, 2014.

No. overall	No. in season	Title	Directed by	Written by	Original release date	Prod. code	US viewers (millions)
26	1	"The Return"	Steve Robin	Cynthia Cidre & Robert Rovner	February 24, 2014	2M6401	2.66
Sue Ellen plans a wedding for John Ross and Pamela. John Ross and Bobby dispute over their joint ownership of Southfork, especially when it comes to a massive remodeling project. Sue Ellen cautions John Ross not to underestimate Bobby and reminds him of the importance of working together as a family. Cliff Barnes begins to plot his revenge on the Ewings from prison. Old Ramos family friend Joaquin (now calling himself Nicolas Trevino) arrives in Dallas presumably to act as Cliff Barnes's proxy. Elena returns to Dallas and secures a job with Ewing Global only to be acting as a mole planted by Cliff and Nicolas (Joaquin). John Ross tries to make a business deal with Emma, who is the acting-CEO of Ryland Transport now that her father is in prison. Christopher meets Heather (a Southfork ranchhand) for the first time.
27	2	"Trust Me"	Millicent Shelton	Bruce Rasmussen	March 3, 2014	2M6402	1.93
Sue Ellen has Bum tail John Ross to see if he is cheating on Pamela with Emma Ryland. Bum finds out that he is, but then warns him not to make the same mistakes that his father made. Pamela begins to have her suspicions about John Ross anyway. Heather lashes out at Christopher when she thinks he and Bobby are behind the efforts to drill on Southfork, but she finds out John Ross is. Christopher invites Nicolas to the Ewing barbecue in an effort to raise capital for the arctic leases. He then volunteers to go to Mexico to see what he can find about Nicolas when details about his alleged deal with Cliff Barnes don't ring true. Seismic tests supposedly determine that the Shale plates are within John Ross's surface rights on Southfork even after the Seismic tester confesses to having been bribed by John Ross. Bobby and Ann look into Harris Ryland's release from jail and find out that he is involved in a secret C.I.A. operation against the Mendez-Ochoa drug cartel.
28	3	"Playing Chicken"	Jesse Bochco	Gail Gilchriest	March 10, 2014	2M6403	1.99
Bum again warns John Ross about being discreet with Emma. He tells Sue Ellen that John Ross is not sleeping with Emma, but then recants his story, giving Sue Ellen reason to be concerned. Ryland warns Ann about the danger posed by the Mendez-Ochoa drug cartel to Emma, his mother, AND her. John Ross wins Southfork ranch hand Bo over to his side on the question of drilling on Southfork land. Nicolas (Joaquin) attempts to bribe a witness in the Cliff Barnes murder case, but he is met by Bobby when he drops off the bribe money. Emma buys a green bustier especially for John Ross who then feigns a headache when Pamela shows up later at home in an identical garment. In Mexico, Christopher meets a man who was cheated out of his share of the profits from a drug patent by Nicolas (Joaquin). He is then taken to the Trevino family compound where he is introduced to Nicolas's (Joaquin's) wife. Nicolas (Joaquin) and Elena sleep together. Bobby shows up at John Ross's drilling site with a Lesser Prairie Chicken - reminding John Ross that drilling would threaten the bird's natural habitat.
29	4	"Lifting the Veil"	Bethany Rooney	Taylor Hamra	March 17, 2014	2M6404	1.78
On the morning of his wedding to Pamela, John Ross is called into a meeting with the Texas Railroad Commissioner about his permit to drill for oil on Southfork where he instead finds Harris Ryland waiting to meet with him. Sue Ellen, expressing further concern that her son is becoming more and more like his father, asks Ann that Emma be made to move off Southfork. Ann reminds her that it might not be safe because of the dangers posed by the Mendez-Ochoa drug cartel. Christopher returns from Mexico after meeting with Nicolas's (Joaquin's) wife who then travels to Dallas and confronts him about his relationship with Elena and blackmails him over his threat to divorce her. Drew is now hiding out on the Trevino family compound and has an attack of conscience about blowing up Christopher's methane rig. John Ross is issued his drilling permit after he discovers that the Texas Railroad Commissioner that initially denied him his permit has some strange sexual fetishes. John Ross and Pamela's wedding goes off seemingly without a hitch. Sue Ellen goes to Bobby over her concerns about John Ross's behavior. Ryland and his mother put into motion a plan to blackmail John Ross. Christopher and Heather hook up after the wedding.
30	5	"D.T.R."	Rodney Charters	Aaron Allen	March 24, 2014	2M6405	1.79
The honeymoon is over for John Ross as Bobby and Sue Ellen try to use the Governor (guest star Steven Weber) to stop John Ross from becoming just like his father, J.R…. a move that could divide the family forever. Meanwhile, Christopher discovers surprising details about Heather's (guest star AnnaLynne McCord) past; Cliff (guest star Ken Kercheval) persuades Elena to try a new tack in her quest for justice; and Judith Ryland (guest star Judith Light) and Ann try, with varying degrees of success, to get Emma under control.
31	6	"Like Father, Like Son"	Steve Robin	Julia Cohen	March 31, 2014	2M6406	1.82
After Bobby’s appointment as Railroad Commissioner, John Ross scrambles to find the funds to keep the Arctic lease deal alive. Using any means necessary, even if it means betraying those who love him most. Sensing an opportunity, Elena and Nicolas get Pamela and John Ross out of the office to divide and conquer. Meanwhile, things get complicated for Christopher and Heather and Ryland’s plot to keep Emma and John Ross apart takes an unexpected turn.
32	7	"Like a Bad Penny"	Millicent Shelton	Pierluigi D. Cothran	April 7, 2014	2M6407	1.87
Bobby and Ann work to get Sue Ellen released from rehab. John Ross pushes ahead on his plans for control of Ewing Global, enlisting the help of one of J.R.’s last business partners. Meanwhile, secrets come to light as Emma discovers the lengths her father and grandmother have gone to control her. Elena decides what to do with a secret she’s discovered and her brother, Drew (guest star Kuno Becker), returns to Dallas, which leads to a surprising showdown.
33	8	"Where There's Smoke"	Michael M. Robin	Cynthia Cidre & Robert Rovner	April 14, 2014	2M6408	2.05
The crushing reality of John Ross's affair with Emma hits home as Pamela views the video sent by Nicolas. As water seeps from the bathroom at Southfork, Ann and Sue Ellen find Pamela sitting on the floor with the bath overflowing, which quickly spirals into an admission from Sue Ellen and Ann that they knew of the affair for some time, but did not want to tell Pamela as it would hurt her. With Bobby finding out about the affair, he demands that Emma leave Southfork, as the spotlight is wrongly turned on her for sending the video to Pamela. Elsewhere Christopher and Heather panic when Bo collects his son from school and goes missing, although they are later found having a father and son moment at the rodeo after Bo has assaulted five policemen and escaped, vowing revenge on the Ewings; it acts to bring Christoper and Heather even closer. John Ross goes to visit Candice and realizes that Harris Ryland has been pulling her strings and paying her to set him up, along with the visit to the brothel where he was pictured with the two young girls. John Ross offers Candice a way of keeping her nice lifestyle but only if she turns the tables on Harris Ryland and gets the information John Ross needs. Following his visit to Candice, he goes to the brothel to meet Judith Ryland where the game heats up and cards are put on the table with each vowing to protect their family. John Ross doesn't realize Emma is hiding in the background listening to the whole conversation and she realizes that he only wants her for his use of Ryland Transport. Drew Ramos remains in the shadows, threatening the ruin of plans with his bullish ways to get his new found revenge on the Ewings, which causes Nicolas to contact the Cartel in order to stop Drew. Sinister relationships grow closer between Harris and Ann following the affair exposure and between Elena and Nicolas as he tries everything to keep things on target for the companies public offering, lowering himself to piercing Elena's diaphragm with a needle, and then having sex with her. Pamela's initial reaction when she catches John Ross and Emma in the act at a hotel is of hurt and anger. However, she takes her coat off to reveal the same lingerie Emma is wearing, and then encourages both Emma and John Ross to join her in a threesome. During their encounter Pamela begins to fit and loses consciousness, with John Ross discovering that Pamela has taken an overdose. Sue Ellen returns to the bottle because of all of the stress of the affair. She collapses at Southfork, with the camera cutting to an angry Bo driving to the ranch, with security now gone since Emma has moved out. Next flames rip through the ranch as a fire breaks out. Bobby and Christopher rush inside to try to rescue anyone trapped, when the ceiling collapses on them, leaving them in mortal danger along with Sue Ellen who is still unconscious on the floor.
34	9	"Denial, Anger, Acceptance"	Steve Robin	Bruce Rasmussen	August 18, 2014	2M6409	1.97
Right after Southfork is on fire, Pamela, Sue Ellen, and Bo have been hospitalized - an infuriated Bobby (and Sue Ellen) goes after John Ross and Emma where she is finally kicked out of the Ewing compound. Pamela, recovering from a drug overdose, reveals to John Ross that their marriage is over with despite his attempt of reconciliation after his affair with Emma (he ends his friendship with her at the same time). Drew is captured by the Mendez-Ochoa cartel, where Nicolas becomes complicit in Drew's execution after news of Sue Ellen who started the fire.
35	10	"Dead Reckoning"	Anton Cooper	Julia Cohen	August 25, 2014	2M6410	1.84
The episode opens up where Luis (Antonio Jaramillo) and Nicolas dispose of Drew Ramos's corpse on the oil field where his father committed suicide years ago. News of Drew's death would make Emma take charge of business after she reads the letter Drew wrote prior to setting Southfork on fire where she later meets with Luis (Antonio Jaramillo). John Ross initially is not on the waiting list to see Pamela but later sees her where their marriage is over, which John Ross later goes on an drinking binge. While in the hospital, Christopher consults with Heather that an experimental spinal cord treatment using stem cell technology is being conducted in Tel Aviv. The detective and fire investigator later concluded that Drew committed suicide where he was the prime suspect of setting the fire (the fire investigator revealed that Drew committed arson where he sprayed rocket fuel on a window curtain and used an IED to set the fire in the guise of a plug in air freshener). Elena showed her mom the deeds that J.R. switched (revealed in the previous episode Legacies) where it is later revealed that Carmen witnessed Bobby and Bum talking about J.R.'s letter. Elena has sex with John Ross and steals J.R.'s letter from John Ross's wallet.
36	11	"Hurt"	Patrick Duffy	Aaron Allen	September 1, 2014	2M6411	1.93
After sharing the truth with her mother, Elena confronts the Ewings over J.R. taking her father's oil rich land and for framing Cliff for J.R.'s death. Sue Ellen, Pamela and Ann are shocked that Bobby headed J.R.'s master plan, realigning relationships and forcing Bobby to re-examine the steps he took in implementing J.R.'s master plan. Christopher reminds Elena how much she has changed. Sue Ellen confronts Bum about J.R.'s death and learns that Bum painted J.R.'s portrait that hangs in Ewing Global. Bobby agrees to reimburse Elena for her father's land, obtains a pardon for Cliff (Elena later hands the pardon document to Pamela prior to making a phone call to Cliff in Mexico), and sells her section 40 (the oil rich Southfork section Digger Barnes falsely accused Jock of stealing from him). Bobby warns Elena that by freeing Cliff she is restarting the Barnes-Ewing feud and the fallout from it is because of her. Meanwhile, Nicolas's plan to take over Ewing Global for the Cartel moves forward, setting the stage for a new battle. John Ross learns from Bum that Nicolas sent Pamela the video of John Ross and Emma having sex. Emma meets Luis about putting her father back in jail and her retaking control of Ryland Transport. Harris and Ann reveal to Emma that he is secretly working with the CIA against the Cartel. In front of Elena, John Ross reveals to Nicolas that Elena only obtained J.R.'s letter because she had sex with John Ross.
37	12	"Victims of Love"	Ken Topolsky	Taylor Hamra	September 8, 2014	2M6412	1.93
As Ewing Global goes public, everyone tries to claim ownership. John Ross tries to bribe the man in charge of the IPO, Calvin Hannah who is removed from the IPO at the last minute. Hunter McKay buys all of the shares with money from the Mendez-Ochoa cartel on orders of Nicolas. Bobby visits an old friend named Tracey Lawton, who is Hunter's aunt in hopes of fixing everything. However when they arrive they find Hunter hanging in his home. Bobby and Christopher think the Mendez-Ochoa cartel is tying up loose ends to erase any trace of illegal activity in their takeover of Ewing Global. It's revealed that Cliff gave Nicolas 3% of Ewing Global and combined with the 48% they acquired gives them control of Ewing Global. Bobby, Christopher, and Pamela blame John Ross's greed for the loss but Bobby says the Ewings must work together in order to defeat their enemies. John Ross receives a message from J.R.'s business partners in the Middle East that he has failed to deliver the 48% of Ewing Global he promised them. Pamela must deal with the choice to either free her father or leave him in prison after receiving the land that Elena blackmailed Bobby for, the same land that caused the original blood feud between Jock and Digger. After showing him the deed to the land, which Cliff presumed his pardon, Pamela left him in prison saying his hatred of the Ewings was more important to him than his love for her and she also says she can never forgive him for blowing the Ewing rig knowing she was on board and killing her children. John Ross approaches the Rylands to make a deal and threatens to bring out their former prostitution Candace and expose their prostitution ring if they refuse. Judith refuses and leaves with Harris and Emma to a meeting with the Cartel. Judith tries to renegotiate Emma's deal with the Cartel saying she'll increase their drug shipments by 25% if they find and kill Candace before John Ross exposes their prostitution ring. Harris tries to get the CIA to help with his problems with the Cartel but his CIA handler says their goal is to have eyes on the mysterious leader of the Mendez-Ochoa cartel. Luis meets the leader of the Cartel and informs him they have taken control of Ewing Global but Luis is angry when told that Nicolas, who was mentored by the Cartel leader, will be running Ewing Global. The CIA handler tells Harris to renegotiate Emma's deal himself and that if the Rylands increase the Cartel's drug shipments to the U.S. the CIA will stop Ryland's trucks. Luis arrives at the Ryland mansion and reveals a case containing Candace's hands and tells the Rylands to increase their shipments by 50% or they will kill Emma and Ann, who are shown on video to have been kidnapped by Luis's men. John Ross meets Bum to get leverage on the Rylands to agree to his deal and Bum informs him that the flash drive John Ross copied from Harris was encrypted with software only readable from a CIA database. John Ross tells Bum to break the encryption and when the time is right he'll reveal the secrets on the flash drive.
38	13	"Boxed In"	Rodney Charters	Gail Gilchriest	September 15, 2014	2M6413	1.86
Ann and Emma are taken to a Cartel house in Tamaulipas, Mexico. John Ross, Christopher, Bobby, Sue Ellen, and Harris meet the CIA. Harris informs his CIA handler that he is doubling the Mendez-Ochoa Cartel's drug shipments with or without the CIA's help. Harris also blames John Ross for the kidnapping because John Ross turned Emma against Harris. Harris reveals that the Cartel leader has been in hiding for the last 4 years and is a notorious Mexican war criminal known as El Posolero. John Ross tells Bobby the Cartel are businessmen and proposes making a counteroffer. Bobby agrees but tells John Ross to talk to him before making a deal. Ryland's trucks are stopped at the border and Luis performs a mock execution of Emma as a warning. John Ross tells Pamela about Ann and Emma being kidnapped and asks for her help in convincing J.R.'s business partner in the Middle East, Nasir, to loan him the money to buy Ewing Global's divisions that are being sold off in return for giving Nasir and his father a percentage in the Alaskan Arctic oil leases, that is only available to American companies. Pamela agrees but tells John Ross that she will stay married to him long enough to take everything from him. Pamela and John Ross meet with Nasir to make the deal where she takes the lead and Nassir agrees to talk to his father about the deal. Nassir tells John Ross he is lucky to have a wife like Pamela. Pamela informs John Ross that Nasir's father has agreed to their deal, and that she stands by what she had said to him earlier. Christopher meets Nicolas's wife Lucia and informs her that Nicolas and Elena are having an affair. She tells Nicolas that Christopher knows his real identity and his debt to the Cartel. It is revealed that Lucia hired the photographer that has been photographing Nicolas and Elena. Later after Lucia learns of Nicolas's affair with Elena, she again meets Christopher and agrees to help him find Nicolas. Nicolas confesses to Elena that after her family moved to Dallas he left the Mexican Catholic school and became a part of the street gang that became the Mendez-Ochoa Cartel. The leader, Ernest Mendez-Ochoa, saw potential in Nicolas's skills in numbers and mathematics and sent him to school in Europe. He made a deal that cost the Cartel $600million and they threatened his family if until he returned the money. Nicolas explains that the Cartel leader wants Nicolas to deliver enough money to buy the next Mexican presidential election and until then Nicolas, Elena, his sons, and wife are all in danger. Elena is angry that he used her to repay his debt to the Cartel. Bobby calls a U.S. Senator on the Senate Intelligence Committee for help in getting Ann and Emma back. He also meets with the Texas Railroad Commission to get an emergency drilling permit in South Texas as a cover for transporting the Cartel's drugs across the border via railroad. Bobby flies to Mexico and meets Luis about the new plan to transport the drugs. Harris and Judith thank Bobby for helping get Emma back. Bobby meets Luis and makes the railroad drug shipment deal. Luis agrees but only allows one hostage to go back with Bobby.
39	14	"Endgame"	Millicent Shelton	Bruce Rasmussen	September 22, 2014	2M6414	1.72
Christopher scrambles to find Elena. The Cartel double crosses Bobby. John Ross risks all to attempt a rescue - Bum decodes the flash drive where John Ross locates a CIA contractor - he goes to the Tamaulipas hideout where Emma is held hostage. Nicolas tries to prove himself by leveraging a deal with the authorities, putting lives in jeopardy.
40	15	"Brave New World"	Steve Robin	Robert Rovner	September 22, 2014	2M6415	1.72
The cartel faces consequences as some lives are saved and some are lost. Pamela sleeps with Nasir as they plot to buy the remaining shares of Ewing Global. She was in the process of taking down the Ewing Global logo at the corporate headquarters until Bobby and Sue Ellen reveal that they will reclaim the shares after they meet the SEC. Pamela invokes the previous Ewing-Barnes feud (Digger and Jock, J.R. and Cliff) revealing the incarnation of a third generation feud. Bobby and Sue Ellen forge a new alliance - by regaining the shares of Ewing Global. Bobby resigns as the Texas Railroad Commissioner forcing John Ross to do the unthinkable - he aligns with Judith Ryland as she ends up as the new Texas Railroad Commissioner, benefiting John Ross's Arctic Leases deal. Elena grapples with a deep betrayal as she finds Drew's St. Christopher medal in Nicolas's travel bag. John Ross discovers a shocking secret about J.R. - he fathered a daughter out of wedlock who Bum is tracking down. Elena finds out that she is pregnant. As Christopher is waiting in his car, the car explodes and burns while Elena watches and screams.

== Ratings ==
=== Season 1 ===
Episode number	Title	Original air date	Ratings share (Adults 18–49)	Viewers (in millions)	Rank per week on cable
1	"Changing of the Guard"	June 13, 2012	1.5	6.86	#1
2	"Hedging Your Bets"	June 13, 2012	1.5	6.86	#1
3	"The Price You Pay"	June 20, 2012	1.3	4.76	#8
4	"The Last Hurrah"	June 27, 2012	1.1	4.08	#15
5	"Truth and Consequences"	July 4, 2012	1.0	3.36	#16
6	"The Enemy of My Enemy"	July 11, 2012	1.0	3.63	—N/a
7	"Collateral Damage"	July 18, 2012	0.9	3.88	#13
8	"No Good Deed"	July 25, 2012	0.7	3.25	#24
9	"Family Business"	August 1, 2012	0.8	3.24	#17
10	"Revelations"	August 8, 2012	1.3	4.29	#7

=== Season 2 ===
Episode No.	Title	Original air date	Ratings share (Adults 18–49)	Viewers (in millions)	Live+3 (Total Viewers in millions)	Live+3 (Adults 18-49 in millions)	Live+3 (Adults 25-54 in millions)
1	"Battle Lines"	January 28, 2013	0.8	2.98	3.7	1.3	1.5
2	"Venomous Creatures"	January 28, 2013	0.8	2.98	3.7	1.3	1.5
3	"Sins of the Father"	February 4, 2013	0.6	2.23	N/A	2.9	1.2
4	"False Confessions"	February 11, 2013	0.8	2.411	3.1	1.2	1.3
5	"Trial and Error"	February 18, 2013	0.7	2.509	3.2	1.1	1.3
6	"Blame Game"	February 25, 2013	0.7	2.55	3.4	1.3	1.5
7	"The Furious and the Fast"	March 4, 2013	0.7	2.79	3.6	1.2	1.5
8	"J.R.'s Masterpiece"	March 11, 2013	0.9	3.56	4.6	1.5	1.8
9	"Ewing's Unite!"	March 18, 2013	0.8	2.67	3.5	1.4	1.5
10	"Guilt and Innocence"	March 25, 2013	0.7	2.61	3.3	1.2	1.4
11	"Let Me In"	April 1, 2013	0.8	2.60	3.6	1.3	1.5
12	"A Call to Arms"	April 8, 2013	0.6	1.94	3.0	1.1	1.3
13	"Love and Family"	April 8, 2013	0.8	2.44	3.0	1.1	1.3
14	"Guilt By Association"	April 15, 2013	0.8	2.82	3.8	1.4	1.8
15	"Legacies"	April 15, 2013	0.9	2.99	3.8	1.4	1.8

=== Season 3 ===
Episode No.	Title	Original air date	Ratings share (Adults 18–49)	Viewers (in millions)	Live+3 (Total Viewers in millions)	Live+3 (Adults 18-49 in millions)	Live+3 (Adults 25-54 in millions)
1	"The Return"	February 24, 2014	0.8	2.65	3.5	1.4	1.6
2	"Trust Me"	March 3, 2014	0.4	1.93	2.7	1.1	0.8
3	"Playing Chicken"	March 10, 2014	0.4	1.98	2.7	0.9	1.0
4	"Lifting the Veil"	March 17, 2014	0.5	1.77	2.6	0.8	1.1
5	"D.T.R."	March 24, 2014	0.5	1.78	2.6	0.9	1.0
6	"Like Father, Like Son"	March 31, 2014	0.4	1.81	2.6	0.9	1.2
7	"Like a Bad Penny"	April 7, 2014	0.5	1.87	2.6		
8	"Where There's Smoke"	April 14, 2014	0.6	2.05	3.0	1.4	1.1
9	"Denial, Anger, Acceptance"	August 18, 2014	0.4	1.97			
10	"Dead Reckoning"	August 25, 2014	0.4	1.84			
11	"Hurt"	September 1, 2014	0.4	1.93			
12	"Victims of Love"	September 8, 2014	0.4	1.93			
13	"Boxed In"	September 15, 2014	0.4	1.86			
14	"Endgame"	September 22, 2014	0.4	1.86			
15	"Brave New World"	September 22, 2014	0.4	1.86			
