= Southfork Ranch =

Conference and event center in Parker, Texas, USA

Coordinates: 33°02′57″N 96°36′33″W

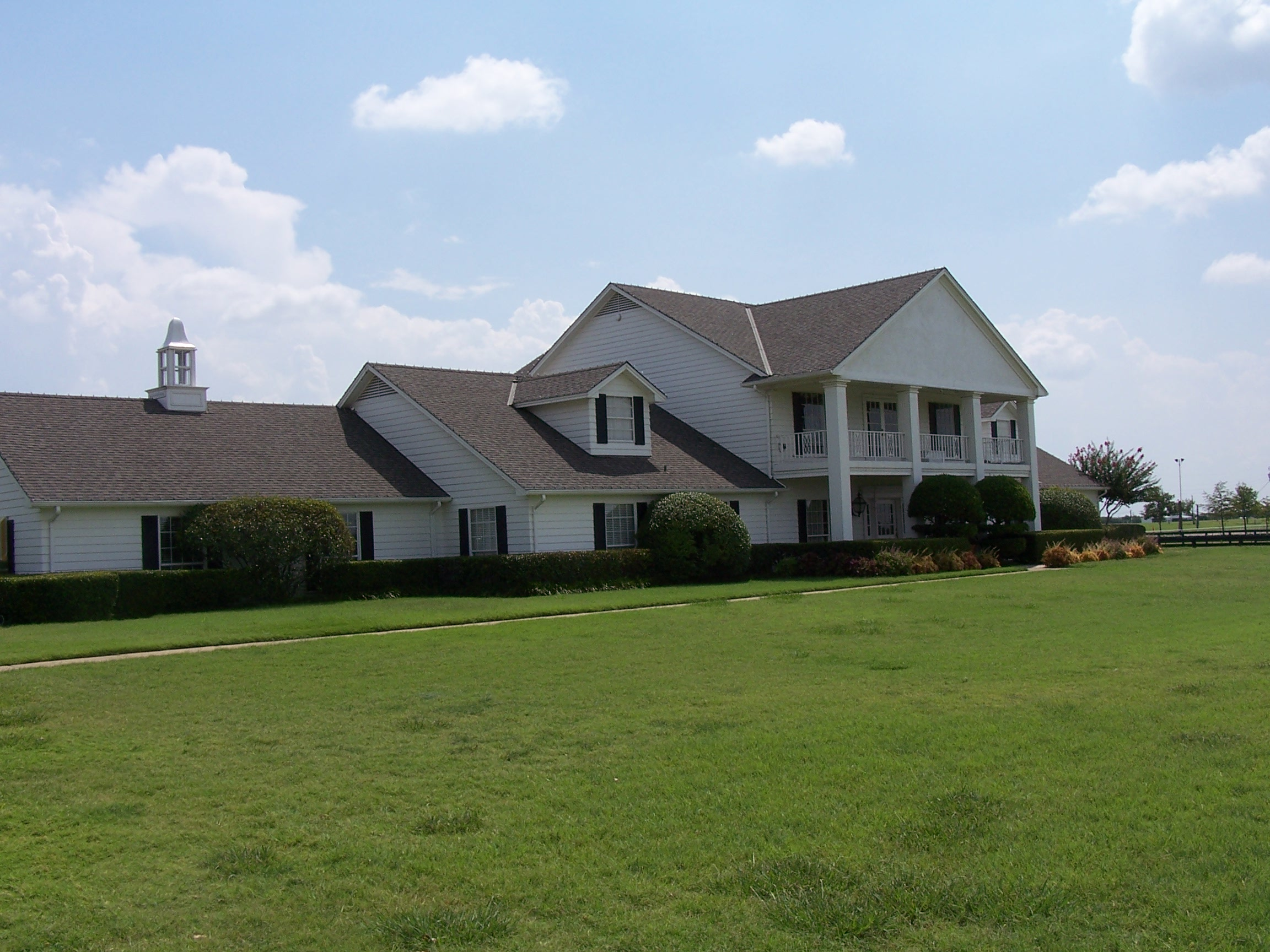
Southfork Ranch as seen in the television series Dallas

Southfork Ranch is a conference and event center in Parker, in the US state of Texas, 25 mi (40 km) north of Dallas. It includes the Ewing Mansion, the setting for the television series Dallas. A variety of tours is offered to the location.

== History ==
The house was built in 1970 by Joe Duncan and was known as Duncan Acres, named after his family. The property was originally 200 acres (0.81 km^{2}) in size. The "mansion" at Southfork Ranch is a 5,900 sq ft (550 m^{2}) house with a 957 sq ft (88.9 m^{2}) enclosed garage that was turned into a den/card room.

The ranch appears in the television series Dallas. Exterior shots were filmed on location from 1978 until 1989, though Lorimar Productions also made a studio mock-up of the ranch's exterior (complete with swimming pool) in California in 1978 for use when the weather made it impracticable to film on location in Texas. From 1989, the series' production shifted entirely to the California studio set. The reunion movies J.R. Returns (1996) and War of the Ewings (1998) returned to the ranch, as did the non-fiction special The Return to Southfork (2004). War of the Ewings, in 1998, was the only time filming was done inside the real ranch for dramatic purposes. Southfork was again used for the new Dallas series from 2012-2014. Some scenes in the prequel, Dallas: The Early Years, were filmed there in November 1985.

In 1993–94 the ranch was featured in the Little Texas music video "God Blessed Texas".

The ranch is now an event and conference center, owned by Centurion American. It was home to the KLTY-FM radio Christian concert Celebrate Freedom, held annually during the Independence Day celebration, and hosted the 4 July 2009 "America's Tea Party", which an organizer said drew an estimated crowd of 25,000–35,000.

In December 2012, a memorial service was held at the Southfork Ranch after the death of actor Larry Hagman, who starred as J.R. Ewing in the series. A memorial book for fans to sign was set up in the "J.R. Ewing room".

Since 2024, Southfork Ranch has hosted Rodeo Celina annually.

Southfork Ranch Main Gate

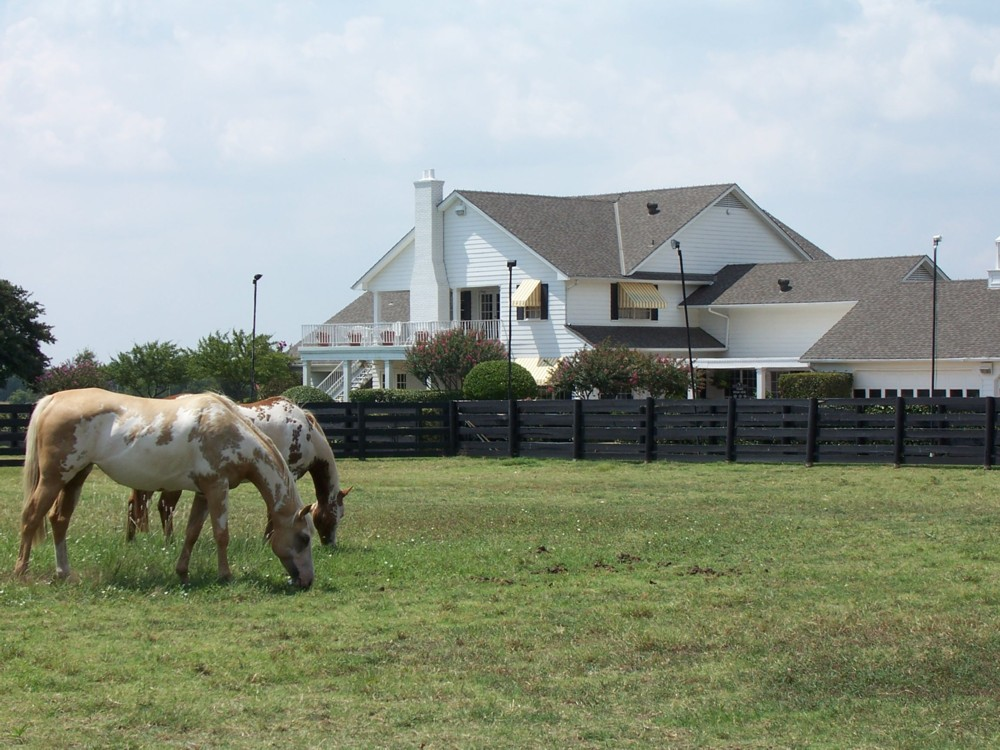
Rear view of mansion

Swimming pool at Southfork

== See also ==
- Texas Music Revolution
