= A House Divided (Dallas) =

- Dallas episode
- Episode no.: Season 3 Episode 25
- Directed by: Irving J. Moore
- Written by: Rena Down
- Production code: 54
- Original air date: March 21, 1980

Guest appearances
- Mary Crosby as Kristin Shepard; Randolph Powell as Alan Beam; Dennis Patrick as Vaughn Leland; Jeff Cooper as Dr. Simon Elby; Don Starr as Jordan Lee; James L Brown as Harry McSween; Jeanna Michaels as Connie Brasher; Meg Gallagher as Louella Caraway Lee

Episode chronology
← Previous "The Wheeler Dealer"	Next → "Killer At Large"
- Dallas (1978 TV series, season 3)

"A House Divided" is the 25th and final episode of the third season of the American television series Dallas, and the 54th episode of the series overall. It first aired on CBS in the United States on March 21, 1980, and is known for spawning the eight-month "Who shot J.R.?" phenomenon. The episode ended with the mysterious shooting of J. R. Ewing (Larry Hagman) in his office by an assailant whose identity was not revealed until the following season. The mystery was resolved in the fourth episode of the following season, entitled "Who Done It", which remains the second most-watched episode in American television history.

In the episode, nationalization of the Asian fields causes financial ruin that affects the cartel members and J.R. Ewing's banker. This leads to the suicide of cartel member Seth Stone (Buck Young). J.R. attempts to run both Kristin Shepard (Mary Crosby) and Alan Beam (Randolph Powell) out of town as they both plot revenge against him. He also attempts to move Sue Ellen Ewing (Linda Gray) back into a sanitarium. With Cliff Barnes (Ken Kercheval) having sought revenge upon J.R. based on an agreement he realized Jock Ewing (Jim Davis) and Digger Barnes (Keenan Wynn) had, J.R. has the oil fields closed down to keep Cliff from earning any royalties. Pamela Barnes Ewing (Victoria Principal) and husband Bobby Ewing (Patrick Duffy) move out of Southfork out of disgust at J.R.'s dealings. In the final scene, J.R. is shot while working late at the office.

== Background ==
J.R. Ewing is a fictional character that William K. Stevens of The New York Times described as "the nastiest man on television, the Iago of Texas oilmen, the smiling snake of a star of Friday night TV's Dallas, a man so venal, so low, so mean, so diabolical that he has become an absolute delight to an estimated quarter of a billion viewers around the globe." His New York Times colleague John J. O'Connor described him as "the eldest son of the oil-rich Ewing family... [who is] a sadistic bully and a swindler" that "captured the public's imagination". Season 3 left the viewer with numerous people to suspect for the murder.

Sue Ellen Ewing (Linda Gray) is J.R.'s wife. J.R. had threatened to reinstitutionalize her for alcoholism. Kristin Shepard (Mary Crosby) is J.R.'s ex-mistress and Sue Ellen's sister. J.R. broke his promise to marry Kristin and gave her 24 hours to leave town. J.R. framed Kristin for prostitution in response to business pressure she put on him. Dusty Farlow (Jared Martin) is Sue Ellen's lover. He was supposedly killed in a plane crash. Vaughn Leland (Dennis Patrick) is J.R.'s banker and business partner in the now-worthless Asian oil leases. J.R. swindled him out of $20 million (equivalent to $63.7 million in 2024). Miss Ellie Ewing (Barbara Bel Geddes) is J.R.'s mother. J.R. mortgaged the family ranch, unbeknownst to his parents, and had plans to drill for oil on the property. Cliff Barnes (Ken Kercheval) is Bobby's brother-in-law and business rival. His father (Digger Barnes) was swindled by J.R.'s father (Jock Ewing), leaving Digger penniless except for some oil wells that J.R. had shut down. Alan Beam (Randolph Powell) is a political fixer. Beam knew too much about J.R.'s dirty dealings, making him expendable after J.R. tried to extinguish him, giving him motive. Marilee Stone (Fern Fitzgerald) is the widow of Seth Stone, J.R,'s business associate who committed suicide as a result of business dealings with J.R. Bobby Ewing (Patrick Duffy) is J.R.'s mild-mannered brother. He is the classic sibling rival, who is fed up with J.R.'s handling of family business and slights to Bobby's wife, Pamela Barnes Ewing (Victoria Principal), who happens to be Cliff's sister.

Although generally regarded as somewhat of a rival of J.R. in the fictional world of Dallas, Gary Ewing (Ted Shackelford) was not a suspect due to his activity in the related fictional Knots Landing world. Similarly, Lucy Ewing (Charlene Tilton) had an alibi provided by liaisons with a married college professor.

== Plot ==
J.R. explains to Jock and Bobby that Ewing Oil is doing fine, leaving Bobby suspicious. J.R. had swindled most of the other oilmen that he knows to salvage Ewing Oil by convincing their cartel to buy worthless oil fields in Asia from him just prior to nationalization. Cartel member, Jordan Lee hounds the Ewings about their underhandedness and makes sure they know Seth Stone committed suicide as a result of the dealings. Soon thereafter, Sue Ellen nurses a hangover while watching the local news to see reports that Ewing Oil sold off most of its holdings just before the nationalization. The report ends with the story of the widowed Marilee Stone, whose husband Seth had bought shares from Ewing Oil. Marilee's calls to J.R. are refused. Banker Vaughn Leland, who lost $20 million (equivalent to $63.7 million in 2024) in the deal, reaches Ewing Oil offices to express his belief that J.R. duped him, but Jock refuses to offer any restitution. All of the cartel members have lost everything they had in the deal and J.R. increased his wealth in the dealings. The Ewings question whether J.R. took advantage of inside information, but J.R. assures his father and brother that such unethical behavior was beneath him.

Lucy Ewing spends time with her professor/boyfriend who is only interested in her for one reason. Attorney Alan Beam visits Kristin Shepard for ideas about how J.R. might have swindled everyone. Shepard suggests Hank Johnson may have information. Shepard has been tape recording secrets of the cartel members from between the sheets and learned how J.R. got them all to buy his oil wells. Beam asks her to try to get information from Johnson by pretending to still be J.R.'s secretary. Bobby talks with Miss Ellie about Pam, who has flown to Corpus Christi to find her mother, Rebecca. They both think it is because she is grieving from the recent death of her father Digger. Sue Ellen apologizes for her drunken behavior the prior night and laments that it gave J.R. fodder for his plans to re-institutionalize her. Bobby says he will try to keep J.R. from taking that action. J.R. tells Johnson to ignore Shepard's request for records and to shred them. Sue Ellen sees a psychiatrist, Dr. Elby. She gets a reminder about drinking until you are unconscious and promises to stop. J.R. confronts Kristin about her mischief. He tries to bribe her to leave, but she does not accept the offer. J.R. spends some time with Sue Ellen. She alerts him that Bobby is going to speak up for her. He is not worried. She then inquires about whether he is going to be unfaithful. When he leaves for another woman she gets upset, but finds a gun lying around, which gives her pause.

Cliff arrives at Ewing Oil with paperwork proving his (and his sister Pam's) claim to a share of Ewing Oil well No. 23, one of Ewing Oil's most profitable wells. After confirming a monthly output of around 5,000 barrels, which would earn Cliff $500,000 per year (equivalent to $1.59 million/year in 2024), J.R. then orders that Ewing 23 be shut down rather than let Cliff earn a dime from it. Bobby expresses his concern to his wife about her obsession that has caused her to quit her fashion buyer job to search for her mother. Lucy spends quality time with her professor. After she leaves he calls his wife. Police officer Harry McSween brings Beam to J.R.'s office to clarify that J.R. wants him to leave town. J.R. demonstrates how he could use his influence to trump up rape charges. J.R. tells Bobby and Jock that he shut down the wells to shut off new claimant Barnes. Bobby is upset, but Jock agrees. Bobby tells Pam they are leaving Southfork.

Bobby and Pam depart in the morning after Bobby informs Miss Ellie and Jock. The parents are displeased. Sue Ellen and J.R. enter at the end of the debate with the parents in time to remind J.R. that he has driven them away. This displeases J.R. and he reminds her that his is going to put her away for speaking ill of him. McSween serves Shepard with a warrant for her arrest on charges of prostitution in front of Beam who was visiting her. He offers them a deal. If they leave town within 24 hours, he won't chase them. She threatens to kill J.R. J.R. calls Dr. Rogers to take Sue Ellen away that night. J.R. hangs up on Leland who is continuing to threaten him. Sue Ellen continues to ponder the gun and tucks it in her purse before heading out somewhere. Cliff visits Digger Barnes' grave. He apologizes to his dad that he let J.R. beat him like Jock had beaten the father, and swears on his father's grave that he will kill J.R. J.R. is at the office at night when Rogers arrives at Southfork to cart Sue Ellen away. He steps into the outer office to pour himself a drink. He hears a noise outside his door and as he investigates, he is gunned down by an unknown assailant and collapses.

== Production ==
=== Regular cast ===
Barbara Bel Geddes as Eleanor "Miss Ellie" Southworth Ewing
Jim Davis as John Ross "Jock" Ewing Sr.
Patrick Duffy as Bobby Ewing
Linda Gray as Sue Ellen Ewing
Larry Hagman as John Ross "J.R." Ewing Jr.
Steve Kanaly as Ray Krebbs (credit only)
Ken Kercheval as Cliff Barnes
Victoria Principal as Pamela Barnes Ewing
Charlene Tilton as Lucy Ewing

=== Writing ===
In January 1980, the producers and writers began plotting the culminating episodes for season 3. Executive producer Philip Capice says they decided to attempt to work in a ploy to hold interest over the summer. CBS ordered two extra episodes, which gave them a chance to weave many storylines into the scripts. He noted that "J.R. had developed into a character we felt everyone out there wanted to see get his comeuppance. And we did need that sort of a cliffhanger to carry us over to the new season." He said that there was consensus that a mystery with several suspects was optimal and that it should be a sudden event. Capice denied rumors that the shooting was a ploy to make it easy to write Hagman out of the script if his contract negotiations became too difficult. Producer Leonard Katzman, executive story consultant Arthur Bernard Lewis and story editor Camille Marchetta decided the actual culprit in mid-March by process of logical elimination with the belief that the audience should not be surprised by someone who was not important to the show as the shooter.

== Reception ==
Although it was not the first TV series to employ season-ending cliffhangers, "A House Divided" popularized the dramatic device and sparked the beginning of an eight-month international media frenzy "Who shot J.R.?". International oddsmakers created a set of odds for the possible suspects: "Dusty Farlow (J.R.'s wife Sue Ellen's lover, who disappeared after a plane crash) is the 6 to 4 favorite, followed by Vaughn Leland (a banker J.R. swindled) and Kristin Shepard (J.R.'s mistress) at 4 to 1. Sue Ellen herself is a long shot at 25 to 1, as is J.R.'s long- suffering mom, Miss Ellie." After Sue Ellen's fingerprints were found on the gun in subsequent episodes she became the favorite at 3 to 1 according to some oddsmakers, while others listed Shepard and Cliff Barnes as favorites. Even Jimmy The Greek posted odds of various suspects. Tony Schwartz of The New York Times estimates that viewers in 57 countries saw the episode. The script for the subsequent episode that revealed the culprit was stolen from Lorimar Productions. The Los Angeles Herald Examiner claimed to have received a copy from a "news source". Eventually they returned it to Los Angeles Police Department Chief Daryl Gates. Discussion about the mystery took place in a variety of media forms including Time.

The media publicity was so strong that actor Larry Hagman had a 10-day holdout in which he demanded $100,000 (equivalent to $318,639 in 2024) per episode, while Lorimar Productions offered $55,000 (equivalent to $175,251 in 2024). After 10 days, Hagman agreed to work filming the subsequent season for $75,000 (equivalent to $238,979 in 2024) per episode. Hagman had been working for $25,000 (equivalent to $79,660 in 2024) per episode.

The episode earned Fred W. Berger an American Cinema Editors Eddie Award for Best Edited Episode from a Television Series and earned Irving J. Moore a Directors Guild of America Award for Outstanding Directing – Comedy Series nomination. The episode finished first in the Nielsen ratings that week and its lead-in The Dukes of Hazzard finished second. Schwartz described the episode as "the most promotable television suspense since David Janssen was vindicated after a four-year run on The Fugitive in the mid-1960s". In 2011, Ken Tucker of Entertainment Weekly named the episode number one of the seven most "Unforgettable Cliff-Hangers" of prime time dramatic television. Queen Elizabeth was intrigued by the mystery. In 2009, TV Guide ranked "A House Divided" #69 on its list of the 100 Greatest Episodes.
