= Dallas Reunion: The Return to Southfork =

- Genre: Television special
- Written by: Stephen Pouliot
- Directed by: Michael Dempsey
- Starring: Patrick Duffy; Linda Gray; Larry Hagman; Steve Kanaly; Ken Kercheval; Victoria Principal; Charlene Tilton; Mary Crosby
- Country of origin: United States
- Original language: English

Production
- Executive producers: Henry Winkler; Michael Levitt
- Producer: Gary Tellalian
- Production locations: Southfork Ranch; 3700 Hogge Drive, Parker, Texas
- Running time: 87 minutes
- Production companies: Henry Winkler/Michael Levitt Productions; Warner Bros. Television

Original release
- Network: CBS
- Release: November 7, 2004

Related
- Dallas: War of the Ewings; Dallas (2012 series)

Dallas Reunion: The Return to Southfork is a 2004 American television special celebrating the 1978–1991 prime time soap opera Dallas that aired on CBS on Sunday, November 7, 2004 from 9:00 to 11:00 p.m. ET/PT.

== Synopsis ==
A retrospective of Dallas which reunited original cast members Patrick Duffy, Linda Gray, Larry Hagman, Steve Kanaly, Ken Kercheval, Victoria Principal and Charlene Tilton at Southfork Ranch in Parker, Texas where they reminisced about their time together on the series, as well as a special tribute paid to the late Jim Davis, while Barbara Bel Geddes was unable to travel because of declining health but sent a telegram of good wishes to her former castmates. Mary Crosby, who played the infamous Kristin Shepard, also made a surprise guest appearance.

During the special, the cast is divided into couples to reminisce: Hagman and Gray in the bedroom; Hagman and Duffy in the Ewing Oil boardroom; Duffy and Principal by the corral; Kanaly and Tilton in the stables; and Principal and Kercheval by the Southfork pool. Also featured are clips from the show, outtakes, bloopers, behind-the-scenes footage, practical jokes and Hagman's home movies during the filming of Dallas.

The special concludes with the cast onstage at Southfork's Oil Baron's Ballroom for a Q&A session with long-time fans, including a countdown of the show's most popular Top 10 cliffhangers voted by fans in an online poll conducted by CBS.com:

Rank	Episode Title	Original Airdate
1	"A House Divided"	March 21, 1980
2	"Blast from the Past"	May 16, 1986
3	"Conundrum"	May 3, 1991
4	"End Game"	May 18, 1984
5	"The Fat Lady Singeth"	May 13, 1988
6	"Swan Song"	May 17, 1985
7	"Fall of the House of Ewing"	May 15, 1987
8	"Ewing Inferno"	May 6, 1983
9	"John Ewing III: Part 2"	April 6, 1979
10	"Ewing-Gate"	May 1, 1981

This reunion marked the first time that Victoria Principal was involved in a Dallas project since she left the show in 1987. Howard Keel, who played Clayton Farlow on Dallas from 1981–1991, died at age 85 on the same day the reunion special aired. The special was rebroadcast by CBS on Saturday, November 13, 2004. Knots Landing Reunion: Together Again, a similar reunion show produced by the same team, aired on CBS the following year.

== Home media ==
Warner Home Video released Dallas Reunion: The Return to Southfork as a bonus feature on Dallas: The Complete Fourth Season DVD set on January 24, 2006. It was re-released on DVD on April 12, 2011, as part of Dallas: The Movie Collection 2-disc set.
