= Who shot J.R.? =

Catchphrase concerning a cliffhanger in the soap opera Dallas

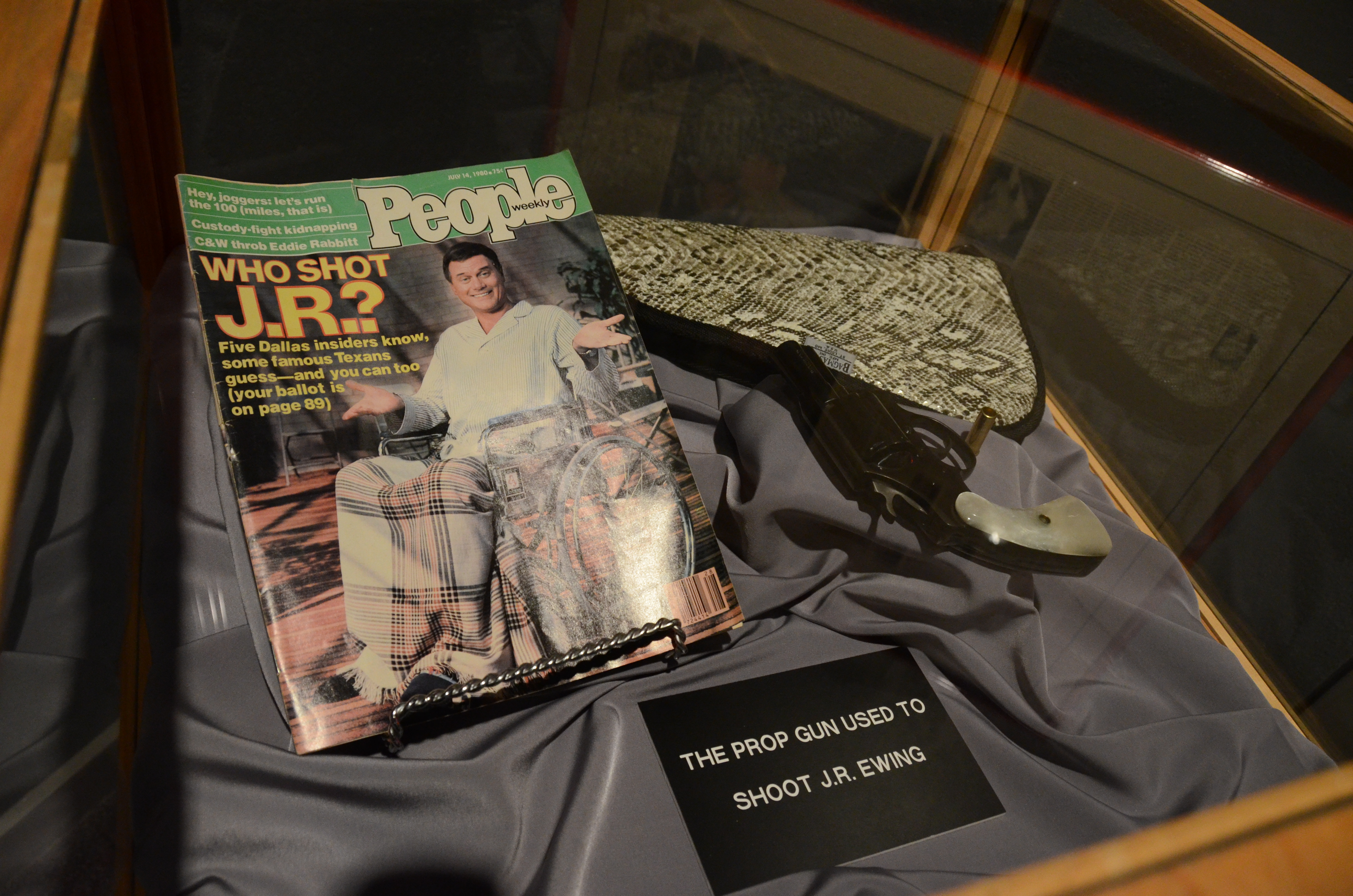
"Who shot J.R.?" display at the Southfork Ranch in Parker, Texas, including the prop gun used in filming

"Who shot J.R.?" is an advertising catchphrase created in 1980 by American network CBS to promote the prime time television soap opera Dallas. It referred to the fictional mystery surrounding a murder attempt against arch-villain J.R. Ewing (Larry Hagman) in the show's third-season finale "A House Divided". The mystery and its catchphrase became an American phenomenon, with American, Canadian and Western European odds-makers setting odds for the culprit. The mystery was not resolved until the fourth episode of the fourth season titled "Who Done It" which aired eight months later, with an estimated 83 million American viewers tuning in, one of the most watched television broadcasts in history. The catchphrase has a strong legacy in pop culture and the format helped popularize the cliffhanger ending for television series.

== Plot ==
In the final scene of season 3, J.R. Ewing (Larry Hagman) hears a noise outside his office, walks out to the corridor to look, and is shot twice by an unseen assailant. The episode, titled "A House Divided", was broadcast on March 21, 1980, and was written by Rena Down and directed by Leonard Katzman. Viewers had to wait all summer to learn whether J.R. would survive, and which of his many enemies was responsible.

J.R. Ewing was a villain on the series who regularly double-crossed business associates, who plotted against his own family, and who called his wife Sue Ellen (Linda Gray) a "slut" and had her committed to a sanatorium so he could take custody of their infant son John Ross. Almost all of the other characters on the show were potential suspects.

Ultimately, in the "Who Done It?" episode which aired on November 21, 1980, the person who pulled the trigger was revealed to be Kristin Shepard (Mary Crosby). Kristin was J.R.'s scheming sister-in-law and mistress who shot him in a fit of anger. J.R. did not press charges, as Kristin claimed she was pregnant with his child as a result of their affair.

== Production ==
Hagman had begun Dallas as a secondary character, but by 1980 he was the star. Advised by friend Carroll O'Connor that the shooting had made him very valuable, Hagman demanded a raise. While negotiating with the actor, CBS prepared to replace him by having J.R. receive facial reconstructive surgery (despite having received the bullet in his stomach). Production for the 1980–81 season began in June 1980 without Hagman. He returned to work ten days later with a new contract that paid him $100,000 per episode and royalties from J.R. Ewing merchandise. Viewers had to wait an additional two months to find out the answer to the famous question, however, as a strike by the Writers Guild of America began in July that delayed the production of most new network shows by eight weeks. During the delay, CBS showed reruns of early Dallas episodes featuring J.R. Ewing, helping the show's many new fans better understand his character.

== Marketing and reception ==
T-shirts printed with such references as "Who Shot J.R.?" and "I Shot J.R." became common over the summer. Several media outlets held "Who shot J.R.?" contests.

The media hype over the series was unprecedented and a global phenomenon. The Barron Knights used the melody and background music of the Gary Numan song "Cars" in "We Know Who Done It", their 1980 parody and spoof of 'Who shot J.R.?'. The episode also inspired a novelty record by radio personality Gary Burbank which reached No. 67 on the US Billboard Hot 100 in July 1980.

During the 1980 United States presidential election, the Republicans distributed campaign buttons that claimed "A Democrat shot J.R.", while Democratic incumbent Jimmy Carter joked that he would have no problem financing his campaign if he knew who shot J.R. Former president Gerald Ford unsuccessfully asked producer Leonard Katzman who the shooter was. When Hagman attended Royal Ascot while on vacation in the United Kingdom—at which the crowds chanted "J.R.! J.R.!" when he arrived—Queen Elizabeth, The Queen Mother enquiried about the identity of the shooter, to which Hagman replied "I wouldn't say, not even to you, Your Majesty". When the British press offered Hagman £100,000 to reveal the shooter, he admitted that neither he nor any other member of the cast knew the answer. Betting parlors throughout the United States, Canada and Western Europe established odds and took bets as to which character had actually pulled the trigger.

== Suspects ==
Every actor and crew member—even Hagman himself—was filmed shooting J.R. to keep secret the identity of the actual shooter. International bookmakers created a set of odds for the possible culprits:

- J.R.'s beleaguered wife Sue Ellen (Linda Gray), who had spent most of her marriage competing with J.R.'s infidelities and her own increasing alcoholism, was originally ranked as an outsider at 25-to-1; however, after her fingerprints were discovered on the gun, her odds were slashed to 3-to-1.
- Dusty Farlow (Jared Martin), Sue Ellen's former lover, was the original 6-to-4 favorite, despite the character's disappearance and presumed death in a plane crash.
- Vaughn Leland (Dennis Patrick), a prominent Dallas banker J.R. had swindled in a business deal, at 4-to-1.
- Kristin Shepard (Mary Crosby), J.R.'s sister-in-law, mistress and alleged mother of his child, and eventually revealed to be the shooter, at 4-to-1, which was later lowered to 3-to-1.
- Bobby Ewing (Patrick Duffy), J.R.'s younger brother, with whom he often butted heads over their professional and personal lives, was placed at 5-to-1.
- Lucy Ewing (Charlene Tilton), J.R.'s niece, who blamed him for her parents' exile from the family and the collapse of her recent engagement to Alan Beam, at 8-to-1.
- Jock Ewing (Jim Davis), J.R.'s father and founder of Ewing Oil, who had grown increasingly impatient with J.R.'s maverick and reckless approach to conducting business, at 12-to-1.
- Alan Beam (Randolph Powell), a political fixer and former fiancé of Lucy's whom J.R. had run out of town, also at 12-to-1.
- Dr. Simon Ellby (Jeff Cooper), Sue Ellen's psychiatrist, stood at 16-to-1.
- Marilee Stone (Fern Fitzgerald), a woman widowed when her husband committed suicide after J.R. swindled him in a bad investment, also at 16-to-1.
- Cliff Barnes (Ken Kercheval), longtime Ewing family rival whom J.R. took particular pleasure in humiliating, was placed at 20-to-1.
- Pamela Barnes Ewing (Victoria Principal), Bobby's wife and Cliff's sister whom J.R. had openly hated since her arrival at Southfork, also at 20-to-1.
- J.R. himself stood at 20-to-1: given the character's reputation, it was not impossible he staged the shooting himself. His odds were later lowered to 15-to-1.
- Jordan Lee (Don Starr), another businessman swindled by J.R., ranked at 25-to-1.
- Miss Ellie Ewing (Barbara Bel Geddes), J.R.'s patient and long-suffering mother, was deemed most unlikely to have committed the act and remained at 25-to-1 odds throughout.

The only characters never considered suspects were Lucy's parents, middle Ewing brother Gary (Ted Shackelford) and his wife Valene (Joan Van Ark), who were featuring prominently in California-based spin-off series Knots Landing at the time of J.R.'s shooting, making it impossible for either to be responsible. Similarly, ranch-hand Ray Krebbs (Steve Kanaly) had no established motive for the shooting, and was not considered a suspect.

=== Real-life suspects ===
Oddsmakers in Las Vegas jokingly placed Tom Landry, the then-coach of the Dallas Cowboys football team, at 500-to-1 odds. Similarly, former Cowboys quarterback Roger Staubach was placed at 1000-to-1 odds. British disc jockey Terry Wogan, who famously referred to Lucy Ewing as "the poison dwarf", was placed at 1000-to-1 odds by British bookmakers.

Wogan was also put forward as a suspect in the "We Know Who Done It" novelty song, as were several other well-known personalities, including The Incredible Hulk, the Lone Ranger, television host Nicholas Parsons, poetry character Hissing Sid and octogenarian Coronation Street character Albert Tatlock (Jack Howarth). Burbank's song also suggested sportscaster Howard Cosell, presidential candidates Ronald Reagan and John B. Anderson, NBC's then-President Fred Silverman, J.R.'s infant son John Ross and even Satan as possible culprits.

== Who shot J.R.? ==
"Who Done It?" was, at the time, the highest-rated television episode in U.S. history. It had a Nielsen rating of 53.3 and a 76% share, and it was estimated that 83 million people watched the episode, more than the number of voters in that year's presidential election. The previous record for a TV episode had been the 1967 finale for The Fugitive. "Who Done It?" now sits second on the list, beaten in 1983 by the final episode of M*A*S*H. In 2011, Ken Tucker of Entertainment Weekly named "A House Divided" number one of the seven most "Unforgettable Cliff-Hangers" of prime time dramatic television.

The episode was an international event, with more than 350 million people tuning in to find out who shot J.R. A session of the Turkish parliament was suspended to allow legislators a chance to get home in time to view the conclusion of the cliffhanger.

== Legacy ==
The great success of this 1980 stunt helped popularize in the United States the practice of ending a television season with a cliffhanger. In addition, the episode is credited with helping CNN, which began airing in June 1980, to get off the ground. The success of the cliffhanger helped Dallas become the most watched show in its fourth season and for the next five years be either the number-1 or number-2 most watched TV show in America.

The "Who shot J.R.?" storyline was spoofed in the February 21, 1981 episode of Saturday Night Live, which was guest-hosted by Dallas star Charlene Tilton. The episode, sometimes referred to as "Who Shot C.R.?", provided several cast members with various motivations to hate co-star Charles Rocket, who is shot in the episode. At the end of the episode, Rocket made the notorious ad-libbed comment "I'd like to know who the fuck did it", for which he was subsequently fired. It was spoofed in an episode of The Jeffersons ("As Florence Turns"), when Florence writes a soap opera based on characteristics of The Jeffersons characters.

In 1990, the first season of Twin Peaks ended with numerous cliffhangers, the main one being Kyle MacLachlan's character, Agent Dale Cooper, being shot by an unknown assailant in a clear tribute to the earlier soap. The storyline wouldn't be resolved until more than halfway through the second season. "Who shot J.R.?" was later spoofed in a 1995 The Simpsons episode entitled "Who Shot Mr. Burns?" which similarly provided many characters with motivation to kill Mr. Burns, and similarly ended on a cliffhanger. In the second part, it was revealed that Maggie Simpson had accidentally shot Mr. Burns in a struggle over a lollipop. Homer Simpson wears a shirt with the phrase "I shot J.R." written on it in the 1991 episode "I Married Marge". In March and April 2001, British soap EastEnders ran a storyline of the same treatment as the "Who shot J.R.?" storyline entitled "Who Shot Phil?".

In Larry Hagman's final episode of the 2012 sequel, Dallas, which aired on March 4, 2013, J.R. was shot again, this time fatally. In the 2013 season 2 finale, it was revealed that J.R. asked Steve "Bum" Jones to shoot him so his "masterpiece" could play out, framing Cliff Barnes for his murder. The main reason he had himself killed was because doctors told J.R. that he had only days to live; he was dying from cancer (as was actor Larry Hagman in real life). In his letter to Bobby he reveals all of this and that he wanted to die helping his family end the Ewing–Barnes feud once and for all. As J.R.'s son John Ross said "The only person that could take down J.R.—was J.R."

In the season 4 finale of Jane the Virgin, Jane "J.R." Ramos (Rosario Dawson) shot a mystery person before "#JRShotWho?" appeared on the screen. The character of Tom from the Irish television comedy series Father Ted is often pictured wearing an "I shot J.R." T-shirt.

In Thomas Friedman's book From Beirut to Jerusalem, he describes an incident in 1983 when journalist David Zucchino, who thinks he is in trouble after being driven through a checkpoint, upon confirming he is from Dallas, is asked by a Druze militiaman in Beirut "who shot JR?". In 1982, Israel's prime minister Menachem Begin asked Steve Kanaly, who visited Israel alongside other Dallas actors, to tell him who shot J.R., promising to keep the answer "as secret as [he] kept the secrets of the Irgun"; the episode "Who Done It" only debuted on Israeli television fifteen days after Kanaly's visit. Begin's request was satirized by the Israeli left wing, who linked it with the Begin government's reinvestigation of the Assassination of Haim Arlosoroff.

In the Homestar Runner webtoon Bug in Mouth Disease, Strong Bad catches up on the in-universe soap opera Caleb Rentpayer, which teases the mystery "Who Shot Caleb Rentpayer?" Homestar readily admits to the act, first to Strong Bad, then on-air.
