= Final Jeopardy (1985 film) =

1985 television film by Michael Pressman

- Written by: Shirl Hendryx
- Directed by: Michael Pressman
- Starring: Richard Thomas; Mary Crosby; Jeff Corey; Jonathan Goldsmith; Michael Cavanaugh; Sharon Wyatt
- Composer: Fred Karlin
- Country of origin: United States
- Original language: English

Production
- Executive producer: Frank von Zerneck
- Producer: Robert M. Sertner
- Cinematography: King Baggot
- Editors: Millie Moore; Maurie Beck
- Running time: 100 minutes
- Production companies: Telepictures Productions; Frank von Zerneck Films

Original release
- Network: NBC
- Release: December 8, 1985

Final Jeopardy is an American crime thriller drama television film directed by Michael Pressman and written by Shirl Hendryx. The film stars Richard Thomas and Mary Crosby as a small-town couple on a trip to a big city where they become trapped in a terrifying predicament. It also stars Jeff Corey, Jonathan Goldsmith, and Michael Cavanaugh in supporting roles. It premiered on NBC on December 8, 1985.

== Plot ==
Marty and Susan Campbell are a small-town couple visiting a large, somewhat unfriendly, declining northern city. They accidentally get lost and stranded in a deserted, rundown neighborhood after dark when Marty gets the wrong address for meeting a business client and are both left behind by a cab that drops Susan off after dark from shopping and whose taxi business requires callers to have business names and phone numbers before sending any cabs after dark. The parking lot that their rental car is in is locked between 7:00 P.M. until 6:00 A.M., leaving them unable to retrieve it before then as they didn't come back until after 7:00 P.M.'s closing time. After Marty barely escapes getting hit by a newspaper delivery truck, they both find a nearly deserted apartment building but no phone to use. Marty and Susan go back to the locked parking lot to try to get their rental car to drive back to their hotel.

When Marty climbs the fence, two Dobermans attack him and he drops the car keys and barely escapes with his life. Marty calls the police from an outdated payphone that still requires coins to obtain a dial tone for emergency calls to try to get help but is told that since he trespassed on the locked parking lot, he can't file a complaint. Susan wanders away and is seen by a gang in a neighboring alley and runs back to Marty, who the police hung up on. They're chased through another alley and barely escape again. Marty finds another payphone that also needs coins for emergency calls and tries to get help again, but a gang member catches him, forcing the usually non-violent Marty to fight back and he and Susan barely escape again. They hide in an abandoned theatre but flee when they find a corpse. Then they find a man and try to offer him money to drive them to their hotel, but the man is scared off. Next, they find an unstable derelict who sends Marty on a wild sewer chase to a non existent police station. Marty and Susan leave the derelict and wander down another rundown, empty street, where Marty breaks a store's windows in frustration over the lack of police response, setting off its alarms.

They are sent to a subway by an untrustworthy street kid only to find it locked, but also find a burglarized church that was vandalized by the gang and sneak into through its broken door. They find an incapacitated junkie whose also-druggie sister thinks they're inside a hospital and that Marty is a doctor. Another gang member appears, giving the sisters directions to another subway to get home, which Marty and Susan overhear while hiding, meaning that both of these girls are members of this gang. Marty's watch has stopped and they find the subway's revolving gate locked to them but manage to squeeze in just as the gang finds them again and chases them through the subway. Marty drives the E-train while the gang enters the train and pulls the cord to stop it. Marty and Susan abandon the train, Susan is sent to hide while Marty lures the gang into another tunnel, where he knocks a scaffold of bricks onto three of its members and lures its leader into the boiler room, blinding him with steam and knocking him out with a large wooden board.

He goes back above ground and finds Susan telling a policeman about their ordeal, who ironically, says "Glad to be of service" to a disgusted Marty. They go to their hotel to get cleaned up and change their clothes, return to the parking lot to retrieve their rental car and drive away after paying a $5.00 overnight fee to its attendant that found its keys but has no change if they didn't have the exact amount. The attendant tells them to be more careful next time and Marty and Susan drive off to return the rental car to its agency before going home.

== Cast ==
- Richard Thomas as Marty Campbell
- Mary Crosby as Susan Campbell
- Jeff Corey as Derelict
- Jonathan Goldsmith as The Bartender
- Michael Cavanaugh as Garage Attendant
- Joey Sagal as Mike
- Jaime Alba as "Slash"
- Travis McKenna as "D.O.A."
- Johnny Venokur as "Ice"
- Jordan Charney as Mr. Clemens
- John Malloy as Policeman
- Dennis Farina as Policeman
- Lycia Naff as Vickie
- Sharon Wyatt as Sharon

== Production ==
The film was shot partially in Chicago, Illinois in 1985. It was produced by Telepictures Productions and Frank von Zerneck Films, and distributed by Warner Bros. Television Distribution.
