= Sharon Wyatt =

American soap opera actress

- Years active: 1977–1995, 1998-1999, 2005-2006, 2008, 2021

Sharon Wyatt is an American soap opera actress.

== Career ==
Wyatt portrayed Tiffany Hill on the daytime soap General Hospital from July 14, 1981, to July 10, 1984, and again from July 30, 1986, to February 24, 1995.

Wyatt was nominated for Outstanding Supporting Actress in the 1994 Daytime Emmy Awards, with Susan Haskell (Marty Saybrooke, One Life to Live) receiving the award.

Sept 1998 Just Shoot Me! Season 3 Episode 2 Steamed as Greta Larson.

From 2005 to 2006, Wyatt played the role of Rachel Barrett on Passions.

In 2008, Wyatt reprised her role of Tiffany on the two-part season two finale of General Hospital: Night Shift.

In 2021, Wyatt reprised her role of Tiffany Donely on the May 21 episode of General Hospital. Her appearance was voice-only on the tribute episode to John Reilly (Sean Donely) who died earlier in the year.

== Filmography ==
=== Film ===
Year	Title	Role	Notes
1985	Commando	Leslie	Feature film
1986	Armed and Dangerous	BMW Woman	Feature film
1990	Class of 1999	Janice Culp	Feature film
1999	The Mating Habits of the Earthbound Human	The Male's Mother	Feature film

=== Television ===
Year	Title	Role	Notes
1977	Nashville 99	Jolene Mason	Episode: "Jolene"
1979	Good Ol' Boys	Unknown role	TV movie (unsold pilot)
1980	Goodtime Girls	Unknown role	Episode: Unknown
1981–1984, 1986–1995	General Hospital	Tiffany Hill Donely a/k/a Elsie Mae Crumholz	Daytime serial (contract role) For Daytime Emmy info, see Awards and nominations section below for details
1984	Three's A Crowd	Lee Pelosi	Episode: "James Steps Out"
1985	Hotel	Diana Chase	Episode: "Fallen Idols"
1985	Final Jeopardy	Sharon	TV movie
1987	Roses Are for the Rich	Harriet Osborne	TV miniseries (2-part)
1987	Dallas	Marvel Reed	Episode: "Mummy's Revenge"
1990	Matlock	WRTX TV reporter (mostly voice)	Episode: "Narc"
1991	In the Heat of the Night	Bree Harris	Episode: "Paper Castles"
1998	Just Shoot Me!	Greta Larson	Episode: "Steamed"
2005–2006	Passions	Rachel Barrett a/k/a Mystery Woman	Daytime serial (recurring role)
2008	General Hospital: Night Shift	Tiffany Hill Donely a/k/a Elsie Mae Crumholz	Episode: "Past and Presence ~ Part 1"
2021	General Hospital	Tiffany Hill Donely a/k/a Elsie Mae Crumholz (voice only)	Daytime serial (guest role); Episode: #14793

=== Theatre ===
Year	Title	Role	Notes
1970s	A Funny Thing Happened on the Way to the Forum	Unknown	Nashville's Circle Theater
1970s	The Contrast	Unknown	Nashville's Circle Theater
1970s	The Gift of the Magi	Unknown	Nashville's Circle Theater
1970s	The Tempest	Unknown	Nashville's Circle Theater
1970s	The Boy Friend	Unknown	Nashville's Circle Theater
1970s	Sweet Charity	Unknown	Nashville's Circle Theater
1997	Barefoot in the Park	Unknown	Los Angeles
2003	Last Summer at Bluefish Cove	Unknown	Darkhorse Theatre, Nashville

== Awards and nominations ==
Year	Award	Category	Work	Result
1994	Daytime Emmy Award	Outstanding Supporting Actress in a Drama Series	General Hospital	Nominated

== Personal life ==
On September 6, 2006, her father died. Wyatt cared for her elderly mother in Tennessee until her mother's death on April 9, 2012.

In 2011, Wyatt announced that she was suffering from osteonecrosis in her jaw, which she believed was the result of her use of the Merck & Co. drug Fosamax.
