= Mary Crosby =

American actress (born 1959)

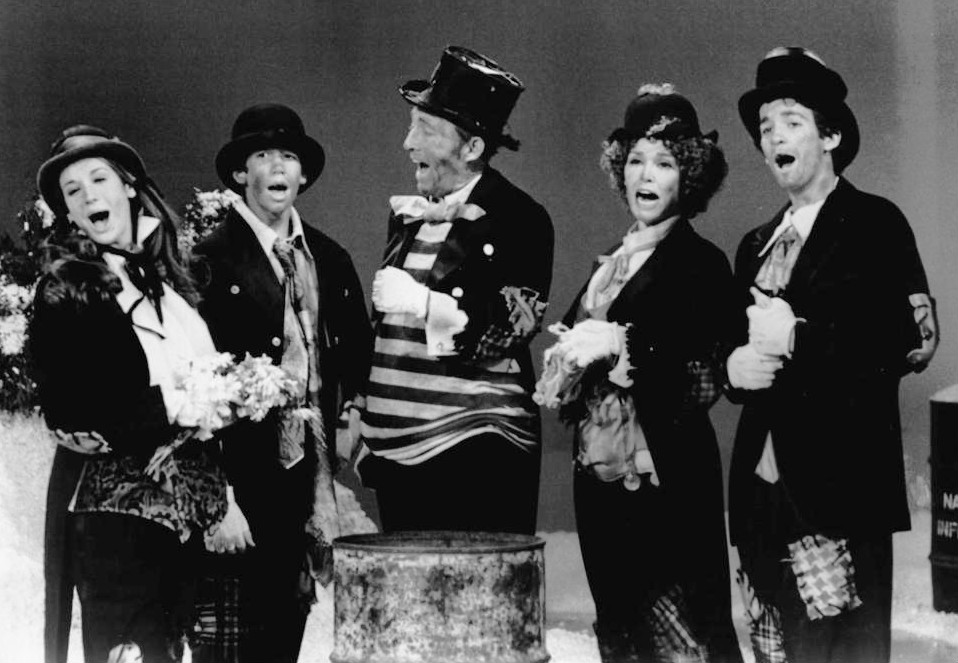
- Crosby (left) and her family in a Christmas special, 1974
- Born: Mary Frances Crosby; September 14, 1959 (age 67); Los Angeles, California, U.S.
- Occupation: Actress
- Years active: 1967–2013
- Spouses: Eb Lottimer (m. 1978; div. 1989) Mark Brodka (m. 1998)
- Children: 2
- Parent(s): Bing Crosby; Kathryn Crosby
- Relatives: Harry Crosby III (brother); Nathaniel Crosby (brother); Gary Crosby (half-brother); Phillip Crosby (half-brother); Dennis Crosby (half-brother); Lindsay Crosby (half-brother); Larry Crosby (uncle); Bob Crosby (uncle); Chris Crosby (cousin); Denise Crosby (niece)

Mary Frances Crosby (born September 14, 1959) is an American retired actress, the only daughter of actor/singer Bing Crosby and his second wife Kathryn Grant. She played Kristin Shepard in the television series Dallas (1979–1981, 1991).

== Early life ==
Mary Frances Crosby was born on September 14, 1959, in Los Angeles, California, the second of three children of singer and actor Bing Crosby and actress Kathryn Grant. She graduated from high school at 15, after which she entered the University of Texas at Austin, where she was a member of Delta Delta Delta sorority, but she never graduated. She is fluent in Spanish. While at college in 1977, her father, Bing Crosby, died of a heart attack.

== Career ==
Crosby made her television debut appearing in an episode of The Danny Thomas Hour in 1967. She appeared in the 1970 musical film Goldilocks with her family and performed with Betty White in the 1978 TV movie With This Ring. She had supporting role in another television film A Guide for the Married Woman (1978) starring Cybill Shepherd and starred in the 1978 top-rated miniseries Pearl. She guest-starred on Starsky & Hutch and CHiPs and had a series regular role in the 1979 comedy series Brothers and Sisters.

=== Dallas ===
Crosby played Kristin Shepard (Sue Ellen Ewing's scheming sister) on the prime time soap opera Dallas from 1979 to 1981, and a guest appearance in 1991. Her character is perhaps best remembered for her part in the cliffhanger ending of the 1979–1980 season of Dallas, titled "A House Divided", which was resolved in the fourth episode of the following season, "Who Done It". In that highly watched episode, J.R. Ewing (Larry Hagman) was shot by an unknown assailant. Viewers had to wait all summer (and most of the fall due to a Hollywood actors' strike) to learn whether J.R. would survive, and which of his many enemies was responsible. In the summer of 1980, the advertising catchphrase, "Who shot J.R.?", was widely publicized.

Ultimately, Kristin Shepard was revealed to have been the person who pulled the trigger in the classic episode, which aired on November 21, 1980. It was one of the highest-rated episodes of a TV show ever aired. Her character, Kristin Shepard, later made an appearance in the Dallas spin-off series Knots Landing in 1980, before a brief return to Dallas in 1981. Once again the focus of a highly rated cliffhanger, it was revealed in the season opening episode (October 9, 1981) that it was Kristin's body floating in the Southfork Ranch swimming pool. She returned for the final episode of Dallas in 1991, playing the same character in a vision experienced by J.R.

=== Later appearances ===
After her breakthrough with Dallas, Crosby played the leading role in the television remake of Midnight Lace. It premiered on February 9, 1981, on NBC. She went to England to star in the ITV comedy-drama series, Dick Turpin opposite Richard O'Sullivan. Crosby also starred in the made-for-television movies Golden Gate (1981), The Big Easy (1982) and Confessions of a Married Man (1982). In 1983, she made her big screen debut in the action thriller film Last Plane Out distributed by New World Pictures. The following year, she played a female leading role in the science fiction comedy film The Ice Pirates by Metro-Goldwyn-Mayer. The film was compared to Star Wars and received mostly negative reviews from critics. She later made guest appearances on The Fall Guy, Glitter, Hammer House of Mystery and Suspense, Hotel and The Love Boat.

In 1985, Crosby starred in the ABC miniseries Hollywood Wives alongside Candice Bergen, Joanna Cassidy and Angie Dickinson based on the 1983 novel of the same name by Jackie Collins and produced by Aaron Spelling. The following year, Crosby played Isabel Truscott Hazard in another ABC miniseries North and South, Book II. Her other television films credits include Final Jeopardy (1985) and Stagecoach (1986). In 1987, she starred as Adele Strauss in the German biographical film Johann Strauss - Der König ohne Krone about Johann Strauss II. She later appeared in films Tapeheads (1988), Deadly Innocents (1989), Body Chemistry (1990), Eating (1990), The Berlin Conspiracy (1992) and The Night Caller (1998). On television, she guest-starred in In the Heat of the Night, Freddy's Nightmares, Murder, She Wrote, Lois & Clark: The New Adventures of Superman, Star Trek: Deep Space Nine, Dream On, Beverly Hills, 90210 and Orleans reuniting with Dallas' Larry Hagman.

In 2004, Crosby appeared in the Dallas Reunion: The Return to Southfork, a television special celebrating of Dallas. In 2005, she played Bennet C. Riley's wife in the Western film The Legend of Zorro. She later appeared in films Queen of the Lot (2010), Just 45 Minutes from Broadway (2012) and The M Word (2014).

== Personal life ==
Crosby was married to Edmund (Eb) Lottimer in 1978 and divorced in 1989. Since 1998, she has been married to Mark Brodka, with whom she has two children.

== Filmography ==
=== Film ===
Year	Title	Role	Director(s)	Notes
1983	Last Plane Out	Elizabeth Rush	David Nelson	Action thriller film
1984	The Ice Pirates	Princess Karina	Stewart Raffill	Comic space opera film
1987	Johann Strauss: The King Without a Crown	Adele	Franz Antel	Biographical film
1988	Tapeheads	Samantha Gregory	Bill Fishman	Comedy film
1988	Quicker Than the Eye	Mary Preston	Nicolas Gessner	Thriller film Also known as Faster Than the Eye
1989	Deadly Innocents	Beth/Cathy	Hugh Parks; John D. Patterson	Thriller film
1990	Body Chemistry	Marlee Reddin	Kristine Peterson	Erotic thriller film
1990	Eating	Kate	Henry Jaglom	Comedy drama film
1990	Corporate Affairs	Jessica Pierce	Terence H. Winkless	Comedy film
1992	The Berlin Conspiracy	Ursula Schneider	Terence H. Winkless	Action film
1993	Distant Cousins	Marcie	Andrew Lane	Thriller film
1993	Crack Me Up	Stacey	Bashar Shbib	Adventure film
1997	Cupid	Dana Rhodes	Doug Campbell	Horror thriller film
1998	The Night Caller	Nikki Rogers	Robert Malenfant	Mystery film
2005	The Legend of Zorro	Governor's Wife	Martin Campbell	Superhero film
2010	Queen of the Lot	Frances Lambert Sapir	Henry Jaglom	Comedy drama film
2012	Just 45 Minutes from Broadway	Sharon Cooper	Henry Jaglom	Comedy drama film
2013	The M Word	Rita Stephenson	Henry Jaglom	Comedy drama film

=== Television ===
Yea	Title	Role	Notes
1967	The Danny Thomas Hour	Joan	Episode: "The Demon Under The Bed"
1970	Goldilocks and the Three Bears	Goldilocks	Animated made-for-TV movie directed by Marc Breaux
1978	With This Ring	Lisa Harris	Made-for-TV movie directed by James Sheldon
1978	A Guide for the Married Woman	Eloise	Made-for-TV movie directed by Hy Averback
1978	Starsky & Hutch	Leslie Slate	Episode: "Strange Justice"
1978	Pearl	Patricia North	Miniseries
1979	CHiPs	Chris	Episode: "Pressure Point"
1979	Brothers and Sisters	Suzy Cooper	12 episodes
1979-81; 1991	Dallas	Kristin Shepard	28 episodes
1980	Knots Landing	Kristin Shepard	Episode: "Kristin"
1981	Midnight Lace	Cathy Preston	Made-for-TV movie directed by Ivan Nagy
1981	Dick Turpin	Jane Harding	5 episodes
1981	Golden Gate	Natalie Kingsley	Made-for-TV movie directed by Paul Wendkos
1981	The Big Easy	—N/a	Made-for-TV movie directed by Jud Taylor
1982-84	The Fall Guy	Coleen Wilcox; Sue Jackson; Kim Donnelley	3 episodes
1982-86	The Love Boat	Megan Lewis; Cora/Coral, the Mermaid; Helen Elaine	5 episodes
1983	Confessions of a Married Man	Ellen	Made-for-TV movie directed by Steve Gethers
1983	Automan	Ellen Fowler	Episode: "Staying Alive While Running A High Flashdance Fever"
1984	Cover Up	Merilee Taylor	Episode: "Pilot"
1984	Finder of Lost Loves	Blythe Stewart	Episode: "Yesterday's Child"; Credited as Mary Frances Crosby
1984	Hammer House of Mystery and Suspense	Ann Preston	Episode: "Child's Play"; Also known as Fox Mystery Theater
1984	Glitter	Karinova	Episode: "On Your Toes"
1984-85	Hotel	Maggie Blackwood; Barbara Medford; Natalie Rogers	3 episodes
1985	Hollywood Wives	Karen Lancaster	Miniseries directed by Robert Day
1985	Final Jeopardy	Susan Campbell	Made-for-TV movie directed by Michael Pressman
1986	North and South, Book II	Isabel Hazard	Miniseries directed by Kevin Connor
1986	Stagecoach	Mrs. Lucy Mallory	Made-for-TV movie directed by Ted Post
1986	Crazy Dan	Bonnie	Made-for-TV movie directed by Stuart Margolin
1987	The New Adventures of Beans Baxter	Professor Vankleef	Episode: "Beans' First Adventure"
1989	In the Heat of the Night	J.D. Sinclaire	Episode: "Sister, Sister"
1989-90	Freddy's Nightmares	Greta Nordhoff-Roscoe; Greta Moss	Episodes: "Lucky Stiff"; "Easy Come, Easy Go"
1990	Shades of L.A.	Jessica Pope	Episode: "Where There's No Will, There's a Weigh-In"
1991	Paradise	K. C. Cavanaugh	Episode: "The Search for K. C. Cavanaugh"
1991-92	Murder, She Wrote	Laura Corman; Mariah Osborn	Episodes: "Tainted Lady"; "The Witch's Curse"
1993	Lois & Clark: The New Adventures of Superman	Monique	Episode: "Neverending Battle"
1994	Star Trek: Deep Space Nine	Natima Lang	Episode: "Profit and Loss"
1994	Men Who Hate Women & the Women Who Love Them	Jennifer	Made-for-TV movie directed by Corey Allen
1995	Heaven Help Us	Guest	Episode: "Tara Fight"
1995	Platypus Man	Beth Garland	Episode: "9 1/2 Days"
1995	Burke's Law	Heather Bonham	Episode: "Who Killed the Tennis Ace?"
1995	Pointman	Dr. Elizabeth Andreas	Episode: "Ultimate Showdown"
1995	Dream On	Beverly	Episode: "Flight of the Pedalbee"
1995-96	Beverly Hills, 90210	Claudia Van Eyck	3 episodes
1997	Orleans	Alya Ransom	Episode: "Baby-Sitting"
1997	Mike Hammer, Private Eye	Sheryl Weathersby	Episode: "A Penny Saved"
2000	Sharing the Secret	Irene	Made-for-TV movie directed by Katt Shea
2004	Dallas Reunion: The Return to Southfork	Herself/Kristin Shepard	Television special
