= The Naked Ape (film) =

1973 film by Donald Driver

- Theatrical release poster
- Directed by: Donald Driver
- Screenplay by: Donald Driver
- Based on: The Naked Ape by Desmond Morris
- Produced by: Zev Buffman; Jerry D. Good
- Starring: Johnny Crawford; Victoria Principal; Dennis Olivieri
- Cinematography: John A. Alonzo
- Edited by: Michael Economou; Robert L. Wolfe
- Music by: Jimmy Webb
- Production company: Playboy Enterprises
- Distributed by: Universal Pictures
- Release date: August 1, 1973
- Running time: 85 minutes
- Country: United States
- Language: English

The Naked Ape is a 1973 American comedy film, loosely adapted from the non-fiction book of the same name by Desmond Morris, written and directed by Donald Driver, and starring Johnny Crawford, Victoria Principal, Dennis Olivieri, Diana Darrin, Norman Grabowski, and John Hillerman, with animated segments created by Murakami Wolf Studios. The film was released on August 1, 1973, by Universal Pictures.

The Desmond Morris book had been optioned for a film adaptation in 1968, and aside from some factual consultation, Morris was not involved in the screenplay writing. Initially set up at Universal, after initial screenplay drafts were submitted, the book was deemed unfilmable and was almost sent into turnaround, until Playboy magazine founder Hugh Hefner, who had been producing other film projects at the time, agreed to co-finance the project.

Leading lady Victoria Principal later said that her career momentum was hurt by the film's failure.

== Plot ==
In a series of satirical live action and animated vignettes, the evolution of humanity is depicted and explored, primarily through the experiences of Cathy, a tour guide in a natural history museum describing the ages of mankind and its advancement, and Lee, a college student who meets Cathy in one of his classes and grows infatuated with her. Through them, rituals of courtship, sex, marriage, workplace manners, and military service are dramatized, suggesting that despite centuries of change, certain behaviors remain constant.

== Cast ==
- Johnny Crawford as Lee
- Victoria Principal as Cathy
- Dennis Olivieri as Arnie
- Diana Darrin as Fat Woman
- Norman Grabowski as Sargent
- John Hillerman as Psychiatrist
- Helen Horowitz as Fat Child
- Robert Ito as Samurai Warrior
- Marvin Miller as Fat Man

== See also ==
- List of American films of 1973
