= Hero at Large =

1980 film by Martin Davidson

- Theatrical release poster
- Directed by: Martin Davidson
- Written by: AJ Carothers
- Produced by: Stephen J. Friedman
- Starring: John Ritter; Anne Archer; Bert Convy; Kevin McCarthy
- Cinematography: David M. Walsh
- Edited by: David Garfield
- Music by: Patrick Williams
- Production company: Metro-Goldwyn-Mayer
- Distributed by: United Artists (United States/Canada); Cinema International Corporation (International)
- Release date: February 8, 1980
- Running time: 98 minutes
- Country: United States
- Language: English
- Box office: $15.9 million

Hero at Large is a 1980 American superhero comedy film starring John Ritter and Anne Archer. The film was written by AJ Carothers and directed by Martin Davidson. The original music score was composed by Patrick Williams.

== Plot ==
Steve Nichols is a struggling New York City actor who accepts the job of posing as comic-book hero for the needs of a film's promotion. After he stops a robbery while wearing the "Captain Avenger" costume, his life becomes unexpectedly complicated. Nichols decides to continue "playing" superhero and discovers that a hero's life is more complex than he expected.

Nichols is hired by the mayor's staff who hope the Captain Avenger's tie-in will win votes for an upcoming election. The plan is ultimately discovered and exposed by the media, leaving Captain Avenger on the outs with the public. Encouraged by his girlfriend, Jolene, to not rely on the costume and mask to gain adulation, Nichols later becomes a bona fide hero when he rescues a child from a burning apartment building.

== Cast ==
- John Ritter as Steve Nichols
- Anne Archer as J. Marsh (not credited as "Jolene")
- Bert Convy as Walter Reeves
- Kevin McCarthy as Calvin Dohnelly
- Harry Bellaver as Eddie
- Anita Dangler as Mrs. Havacheck
- Jane Hallaren as Gloria Preston
- Leonard Harris as Mayor
- Rick Podell as Milo
- Allan Rich (shown a second time as "Allen") as Marty Fields

In addition, Joyce Brothers has a cameo as herself, while Penny Crone, an Emmy Award-winning reporter in the New York City market, has an uncredited cameo as a reporter, and a young Kevin Bacon appeared as "2nd teenager" in a brief scene with Ritter's character.

== Reception ==
Roger Ebert gave the film two out of four stars and called it "a big, dumb, silly, good-hearted albatross of a comedy". He said that although the film might appeal to fans of John Ritter, it did not appeal to him. Gene Siskel had a different reaction, stating the movie was a fun comedy that was appropriate for family viewing and recommending viewers of their TV show see it.

== See also ==
- Blankman, a 1994 action comedy with a similar premise.
- Kick-Ass, a 2010 action comedy with a similar premise.
- Vigilante film
