= Goldilocks (film) =

- Based on: Goldilocks and the Three Bears
- Written by: AJ Carothers
- Voices of: Bing Crosby; Kathryn Crosby; Mary Crosby; Nathaniel Crosby
- Theme music composer: Sherman Brothers

Production
- Executive producers: David H. DePatie; Friz Freleng

Original release
- Network: NBC
- Release: March 31, 1970

Goldilocks is a half-hour musical animated film, the audio tracks for which were recorded in the summer of 1969, produced strictly for television in 1970 by DePatie-Freleng Enterprises (known for their work on The Pink Panther, of which the animation style is strongly reminiscent) and produced with the assistance of Mirisch-Geoffrey Productions.

== Plot ==
One summer day, Bing Crosby, his wife Kathryn and their two youngest children Mary Frances and Nathaniel are camping out on a fishing trip. Bing and the children have returned to camp from the lake with their day's catch.

Upon showing their prizes to Kathryn, she recoils in disgust, saying "Them's that does the catch, does the cleanin". So Bing and the kids return to the lake, pull up a comfortable log upon which to sit and begin the chore. After a fashion, Mary tells her father that, apart from the tall tales – this is the only part about fishing she doesn't like. Nathaniel pipes up that he's bored, to which his father reminds him that before modern conveniences, people used to entertain one another by storytelling, volunteering the first example.

After choosing Goldilocks, Nathaniel complains that it is just a kid's fairytale. Their father reminds them, however, that since it has been such a long time since they heard it last, there might be a little more to the story than they remember. This leads into the first song, Take a Longer Look where Bing encourages the children to read between the lines.

One of the verses mentions a butterfly going by, and suddenly, Mary Frances can see the animated creature alighting right on the tip of her nose. Following it deep into the animated forest, she becomes Goldilocks and remains the only live-action figure.

The story proceeds pretty much in the traditional fashion, including when the Bears go out for a walk in the woods to let their porridge cool, Papa Bear (who is drawn and animated to resemble Bing) sings a song about The Human Race in which he derides the workaday world and people who don't take time to stop and smell the flowers, telling his youngest son, he'll understand when he's older.

Unaware of all this, Goldilocks gets lost, becomes tired and hungry, and spots the Bears' house, the door ajar. After sampling the food and furniture, Goldilocks lays down in Baby Bear's bed, as she sings the third musical number Don't Settle For Less (Than The Best).

The Bears return from their jaunt to find the porridge, chairs and beds all disturbed. Papa Bear is incensed that such an intruder would enter his home, finds Goldilocks in Baby Bear's bed and is about to raise his golf club to seriously injure the intruder when Baby Bear hangs onto the business end thereof shouting `No, Papa! Don't! It's only a people cub!' Well after the misunderstanding is cleared up, the Bears share their meal with her and set about trying to find out more about her.

Papa Bear's best friend, the Bobcat (named for the swing band headed up by his younger brother in the 1930s and 1940s and who was supposed to play the part, but couldn't due to other commitments), is a loudmouthed and bigoted braggart who has no trouble telling his decidedly unpopular opinions to anyone who would listen.

After relaying to the Bears the fact that she was wandering alone in the forest and got lost, Goldilocks – in an homage to MGM's The Wizard of Oz moves in until such time as everybody can figure out how to get her back home.

The Bobcat, however, has been eavesdropping at the Bears' window and is about ready to throw up at all the sappiness – not to mention the fact that Goldilocks – cub or not – is still a human and, therefore, not to be trusted in the forest. He runs back to a clearing where he gathers all the other forest animals and proceeds to convince them, by his decidedly skewered viewpoint, that Goldilocks does not belong in the forest. The easily swayed animals agree to assist Bobcat.

Subsequently, the Bobcat leads an angry mob of forest animals over to the Bears' house and demands that Papa Bear himself turn Goldilocks over to them. Of course, Papa Bear holds his ground, telling the crowd sternly: "Now, I love this forest just as much as anybody. I'll be the first to protect it when it needs it. But this forest does NOT need protecting from a little girl who came to our house because she was lost and tired and hungry". The Bobcat is seen blowing a raspberry to his friend and tells him they will not be mollified so easily.

Papa Bear continues attempting to calm the crowd down and allow them to see through the Bobcat's unfounded fears, but Goldilocks sees the melee, worries that their next move will be to chase, capture, and hurt her, and tries to run away. Looking over her shoulder to make sure she is not being chased by the mob, she trips on an unseen log, and knocks herself cold. Baby Bear sees the accident and runs to get his father. Walking over to the site of the accident, followed timidly by the now somber crowd, and nobody knowing yet if Goldilocks is going to be alright or not, Papa Bear chastises the group for their reckless behavior, especially the Bobcat.

The animals realize they have been duped and then turn on the Bobcat, who stomps off in annoyance, unrepentant and angry at not being appreciated for "ridding the forest of this scourge".

Time passes and, fortunately, Goldilocks comes around, with only a bump on the head to show for her trouble. The animals cheer at her recovery and invite her and her family each in their own way to come and enjoy the forest anytime they want.

The Bears find the path upon which Goldilocks got herself lost in the first place, and they, along with all the other animals, escort her safely out of the forest.

Back to live action again on the same log on which they started their imaginary journey, the trio pick up their fish and supplies and head back to camp. Kathryn notices the food hamper is unexpectedly open, and there's been nobody in camp all day but her. Minutes later, Bing notices his tackle box has been disturbed, and, an instant later, the kids see the door to the tent is open.

They find the little bear cub who got lost from his family. The kids all marvel at how cute and tiny he is, but their mother warns that bears can bite and will have a mother and father nearby. In another homage to MGM's classic 1939 musical, Mary quips that she hopes it's somebody they know (referencing both the dual roles performed by the rest of the cast as well as setting up the intended second episode featuring Frank and Nancy Sinatra which was never filmed). Bing, Kathryn, Mary Frances, and Nathaniel send the little bear cub on his way – back to his family.

The reprise of Take a Longer Look is sung by the entire cast just before the credits roll.

== Outtakes ==
In an unaired segment, as Goldilocks is being escorted out of the forest by all the other animals, the Bobcat is seen together with his wife the Lynx (in a nod to mixed-marriages) who indicates they are expecting cubs.

After hearing of the aforementioned adventure from a deer on her way back home, the Lynx moves out of the den to have her cubs by herself, and leaves him to his own devices. However the Bobcat sees the error of his ways when he finds a litter of Fox kits near their mother, who has died of a forest-borne illness. He becomes a single parent to them and raises them as if they were his own. Time goes by and the Fox kits find the Bobcat-Lynx cubs in the forest, make friends and begin to play together. The cubs' mother goes to find out what all the whooping and hollering is all about, and finds her cubs and the Fox kits having fun in the clearing. In an homage to The Brady Bunch then in the middle of their second season – the Lynx moves back into the now-larger den with the cubs, the Bobcat brings the Fox kits, they become a blended family and everybody lives happily ever after.

Deemed by producers as one message too many in a half-hour children's cartoon, the three-and-a-half minute scene was cut prior to telecast. The footage and soundtrack have been lost to time, but a script draft remains.

== Telecast and production ==
First broadcast on NBC in March 1970, the production was scripted by AJ Carothers and the songs were written by Robert and Richard Sherman who also assisted with production (unusual in those days). Veteran animation producers David H. DePatie and Friz Freleng also assisted and the production starred Bing Crosby, America's longtime favorite crooner.

The show was unique in that it included not only Bing himself, but his then-wife and two youngest children as well. In a 1975 interview with Friz Freleng and A.J. Carothers, the men relate that two lines of dialogue, one in the beginning where Bing volunteers to tell the first story and one in the end where Mary Frances hopes that the live baby bear's parents are somebody they know, was supposed to indicate that this special had been intended as the pilot for an entire series of fairytales starring major entertainers and their families, both past and present, and retold with a similar emphasis on positive values, validations and motivations.

However, after this special aired around Eastertime and garnered a moderate to low viewership, the series was shelved, especially after a subsequent telecast later in the season attracted an even smaller audience.

The following year, Marlo Thomas and a similar cast of celebrities recorded the equally groundbreaking and Grammy Award-winning children's album entitled Free to Be... You and Me which spawned a Newberry Award-winning book and Emmy Award winning ABC-TV special in 1974. That show itself spawned an international co-production entitled Free to Be... a Family in 1988.

All three specials remain mileposts in cultural development.

== Home video ==
After a small handful of telecasts in syndication throughout the 1970s and 1980s, the show was released exactly once on VHS in 1986. Due to restrictions imposed by the estate of Bing Crosby, it has never been re-telecast or re-released on any home-video format since then. Intact copies fetch high dollar amounts at online retailers.

== Selected cast (live action/animation voice) ==
- Bing Crosby as "Himself" and "Papa Bear" (Voice)
- Mary Crosby as "Herself" and "Goldilocks" (voice) (credited as "Mary Frances Crosby")
- Nathaniel Crosby as "Himself" and "Baby Bear".
- Kathryn Grant as "Herself" and "Mama Bear" (voice) (credited as "Kathryn Grant Crosby")
- Paul Winchell as Bobcat (and Narrator on the soundtrack album)

Most of the rest of the Pink Panther cartoon voice cast such as Don Messick, Avery Schreiber, and Daws Butler were also featured in minor roles as other animals.

== Music ==
The three songs in the musical followed along a path created by a groundbreaking series of box set 45 RPM children's records produced by Playhour and released beginning in 1968. The short catchy songs included therein – usually clocking in at under two minutes and featuring bright, upbeat messages of inclusion.

The three songs included are:

- "The Human Race"
- "Take a Longer Look"
- "Don't Settle for Less Than the Best"

Songs and selected dialogue clips were included in the soundtrack album along with narration by famed voice-over actor Paul Winchell. First released in 1971 as DL-3511 by Decca Custom Records for a special promotion of Evans-Black Carpets by Armstrong, the album was re-released by Disneyland Records as ST-3889 with an accompanying 12-page storybook.

The songs "Take a Longer Look" and "The Human Race" were re-recorded on February 19, 1970 with Jimmie Haskell and his Orchestra at A&M Studios on La Brea Avenue in Hollywood for possible release as a pop single. The tracks were not released until they appeared on a Collectors' Choice Music CD "So Rare: Treasures From The Crosby Archive" in 2010.
