= Roses Are for the Rich =

- Genre: Drama
- Based on: Roses Are for the Rich by Jonell Lawson
- Written by: Judith Paige Mitchell
- Directed by: Michael Miller
- Starring: Lisa Hartman; Bruce Dern; Joe Penny; Richard Masur; Howard Duff; Morgan Stevens; Sharon Wyatt
- Music by: Arthur B. Rubinstein
- Country of origin: United States
- Original language: English

Production
- Executive producers: Karen Mack; Robert A. Papazian
- Producer: Jonathan Bernstein
- Cinematography: Kees Van Oostrum
- Editors: Ann E. Mills; Greg Prange; Barry Taylor
- Running time: 200 minutes
- Production company: Phoenix Entertainment Group

Original release
- Network: CBS
- Release: May 17 – May 19, 1987

Rose Are for the Rich is a 1987 American two-part, four-hour made-for-television drama film starring Lisa Hartman, Bruce Dern, Joe Penny, Richard Masur and Howard Duff. The film is directed by Michael Miller and written by Judith Paige Mitchell, based on the 1986 novel of the same name by Jonell Lawson. It was originally broadcast on CBS on May 17 and 19, 1987.

== Plot ==
In a small town in Appalachia, Autumn's father died in a coal mining accident, and her boyfriend Lonnie died the same way. She thinks that the fatalities would not have happened if the owner of the mines, Douglas Osbourne, was concerned about others. His son, Brian Osbourne, is angry with his father because of how he treats others, so he decides to not inherit the business. Due to her belief that Douglas murdered her husband because of his disregard for others, Autumn decides to go up against him and his business. Autumn becomes a successful businesswoman by working at a store and a bar. Both the store owner and bar owner fall in love with her, but she is only interested in stopping Douglas.

== Cast ==
- Lisa Hartman as Autumn McAvin Norton Corbett Osborne
- Bruce Dern as Douglas Osborne
- Joe Penny as Lloyd Murphy
- Richard Masur as Everett Corbett
- Howard Duff as Denton
- Morgan Stevens as Brian Osborne
- Sharon Wyatt as Harriet Osborne
- Jim Youngs as Lonnie Norton
- Betty Buckley as Ella

== Reception ==
Tom Jicha, writing for Miami News, said, "The soapy plot is preposterous, tedious, disjointed and predictable." A reviewer for Schenectady Gazette, said, "This is silly stuff, getting sillier by the hour". Tom Shales, of the Washington Post, ""Roses Are for the Rich" has enough storm and schmaltz-and, indeed, enough on-screen breeding, too-to loom as a crowd pleaser. Provided it's a very docile crowd. As these things go it is haplessly entertaining."
