= Kathryn Crosby =

American actress (1933–2024)

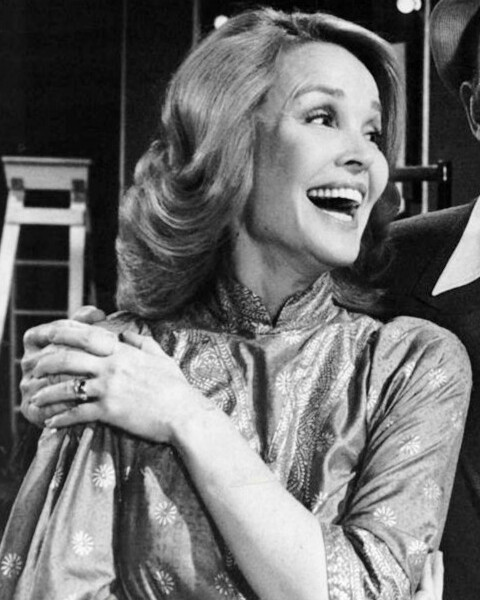
- Crosby in 1976
- Born: Olive Kathryn Grandstaff; November 25, 1933; Houston, Texas, U.S.
- Died: September 20, 2024 (aged 90); Hillsborough, California, U.S.
- Resting place: Holy Cross Cemetery, Culver City
- Other names: Kathryn Grandstaff; Kathryn Grant
- Education: University of Texas at Austin (BFA)
- Occupations: Actress; singer
- Years active: 1953–1979; 2010
- Spouses: Bing Crosby (m. 1957; died 1977) Maurice William Sullivan (m. 2000; died 2010)
- Children: Harry Crosby; Mary Crosby; Nathaniel Crosby

Olive Kathryn Crosby (née Grandstaff; November 25, 1933 – September 20, 2024) was an American actress and singer who performed in films, primarily under the stage name Kathryn Grant. She married Bing Crosby in 1957 and subsequently appeared on television with him and hosted a talk show, The Kathryn Crosby Show, on which he occasionally appeared. She returned to acting after his death in 1977.

== Early life and education ==
Olive Kathryn Grandstaff was born on November 25, 1933, in Houston, Texas, to Delbert Emery Grandstaff Sr., a high school football coach, and Olive Catherine Grandstaff (née Stokely), an elementary school teacher. She was raised in West Columbia with four siblings, won her first beauty pageant at the age of three, and was spotted by a Hollywood talent scout when queen of the Houston Rodeo. She graduated from the University of Texas at Austin with a Bachelor of Fine Arts in drama in 1955, finishing her degree at summer school after moving to Hollywood to begin her career.

On June 16, 1963, Crosby became a registered nurse after studying at Queen of Angels Hospital in Los Angeles. She later earned a teaching qualification.

== Career ==
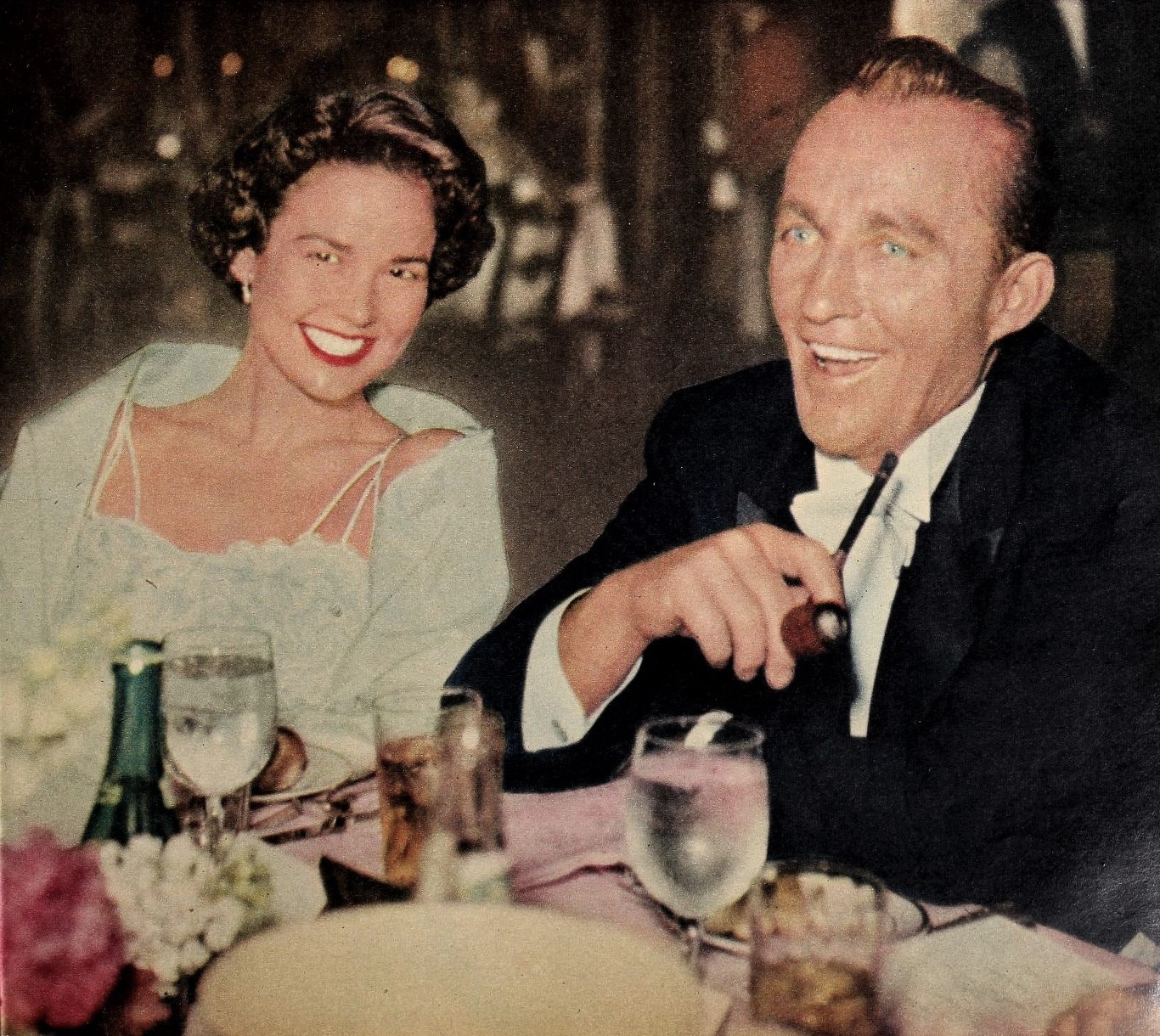
Crosby with her husband Bing Crosby, 1958

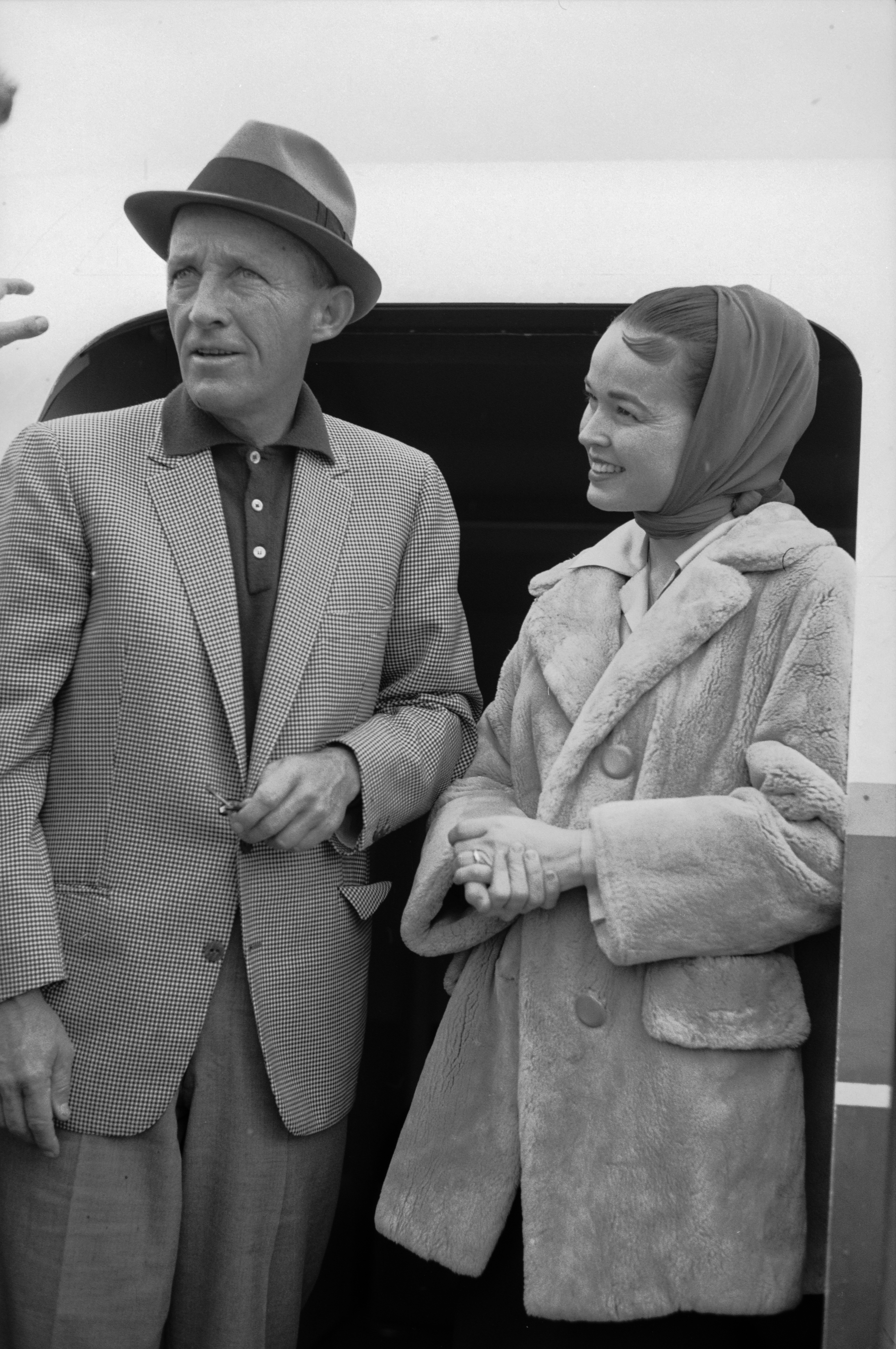
Kathryn and Bing Crosby in 1960

Her film career began in 1953. She had featured roles such as Princess Parisa in The 7th Voyage of Sinbad (1958) and in the courtroom drama Anatomy of a Murder (1959). She also played the part of Mama Bear with her husband and children in Goldilocks, and she co-starred with Jack Lemmon in the comedy Operation Mad Ball (1957), with Tony Curtis in the drama Mister Cory (1957), and as a trapeze artist in The Big Circus (1959). When she met Bing Crosby on the Paramount lot, she was newly under contract. However, at his urging she largely retired from acting by the 1960s.

Crosby appeared with her children on annual Crosby family Christmas specials and in commercials for Minute Maid orange juice.

In the mid-1970s, she hosted The Kathryn Crosby Show, a 30-minute local talk show on KPIX-TV in San Francisco. Husband Bing appeared as a guest occasionally. After Bing Crosby's death in 1977, she took on a few smaller roles and the lead in the short-lived 1996 Broadway musical State Fair.

From 1985 to 2001, Crosby hosted the Crosby National Golf Tournament at Bermuda Run Country Club in Bermuda Run, North Carolina. A nearby bridge carrying U.S. Route 158 over the Yadkin River was renamed for her in the 1990s.

On June 1, 2014, Crosby sang in a Rodgers and Hart tribute.

== Personal life and death ==
She married widower Bing Crosby on October 24, 1957 in Las Vegas; she was 23 and he was 54. The couple had three children: Harry, Mary Frances, and Nathaniel. He died in 1977; in 1983, she published a memoir, My Life With Bing, in which she recounted Bing Crosby's efforts to have her concentrate exclusively on family life and wrote that he "alternately implored and enjoined me to get organized, [which] was very much like ordering a government to reduce inflation".

In 2000, she remarried to Maurice William Sullivan, who had tutored her children. On November 4, 2010, Sullivan was killed and she was seriously injured in an automobile accident in the Sierra Nevada.

She died on September 20, 2024, at her home in Hillsborough, California, at the age of 90. She is interred in the Crosby family plot at Holy Cross Cemetery in Culver City.

== Filmography ==
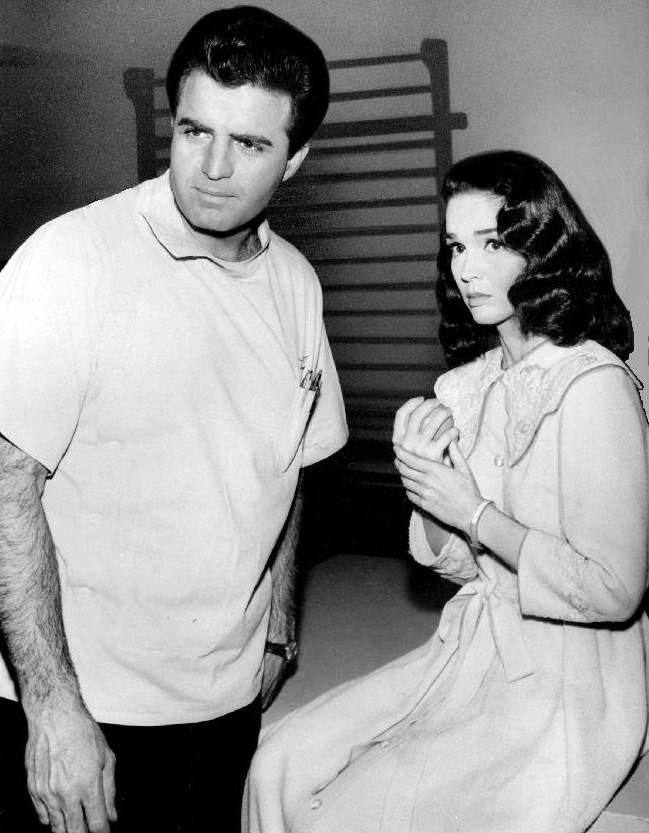
Crosby with Vince Edwards as a guest star on Ben Casey, 1965

- So This Is Love (1953) – Showgirl (uncredited)
- Arrowhead (1953) – Miss Mason (uncredited)
- Forever Female (1953) – Young Hopeful (uncredited)
- Casanova's Big Night (1954) – Girl on Bridge (uncredited)
- Living It Up (1954) – Manicurist (uncredited)
- Rear Window (1954) – Girl at Songwriter's Party (uncredited)
- Unchained (1955) – Sally Haskins (uncredited)
- Tight Spot (1955) – Girl Honeymooner (uncredited)
- Cell 2455 Death Row (1955) – Jo-Anne
- 5 Against the House (1955) – Jean, Young Woman in Nightclub (uncredited)
- The Phenix City Story (1955) – Ellie Rhodes
- My Sister Eileen (1955) – Young Hopeful (uncredited)
- Storm Center (1956) – Hazel Levering
- Reprisal! (1956) – Taini
- The Wild Party (1956) – Honey
- Mister Cory (1957) – Jen Vollard
- The Guns of Fort Petticoat (1957) – Anne Martin
- The Night the World Exploded (1957) – Laura Hutchinson
- Operation Mad Ball (1957) – Lt. Betty Bixby
- The Brothers Rico (1957) – Norah Malaks Rico
- Gunman's Walk (1958) – Clee Chouard
- The 7th Voyage of Sinbad (1958) – Princess Parisa
- Anatomy of a Murder (1959) – Mary Pilant
- The Big Circus (1959) – Jeannie Whirling
- 1001 Arabian Nights (1959) – Princess Yasminda (voice)
- The Bing Crosby Show (1965) – Stephanie
- Great Performances (1971) – Lise
- The Initiation of Sarah (1978) – Mrs. Goodwin
- This Is the Life (1979) – Joyce Williams
- Queen of the Lot (2010) – Elizabeth Lambert
