= Stagecoach (1986 film) =

1986 film directed by Ted Post

- DVD cover
- Genre: Western
- Based on: Stagecoach 1939 film by Dudley Nichols; "The Stage to Lordsburg" 1937 story in Collier's by Ernest Haycox
- Teleplay by: James Lee Barrett
- Directed by: Ted Post
- Starring: Willie Nelson; Kris Kristofferson; Johnny Cash; Waylon Jennings
- Music by: David Allan Coe; Willie Nelson
- Country of origin: United States
- Original language: English

Production
- Executive producers: Raymond Katz; Willie Nelson
- Producers: Hal W. Polaire; Jack Thompson
- Cinematography: Gary Graver
- Editor: Geoffrey Rowland
- Running time: 100 minutes
- Production companies: Heritage Entertainment Inc.; Plantation Productions; Raymond Katz Productions

Original release
- Network: CBS
- Release: May 18, 1986

Stagecoach is a 1986 American Western television film directed by Ted Post and written by James Lee Barrett. It is a remake of the 1939 film of the same name, itself based on a short story by Ernest Haycox. It is the second remake of the film, after the 1966 feature film. Kris Kristofferson stars as the Ringo Kid. Willie Nelson portrays famous gunslinger and dentist Doc Holliday, Johnny Cash portrays Marshal Curly Wilcox and Waylon Jennings plays the gambler Hatfield. All four stars were associated as members of the country music supergroup The Highwaymen. The supporting cast features Elizabeth Ashley, Anthony Newley, Tony Franciosa, Mary Crosby, June Carter Cash, John Carter Cash and Jessi Colter. The film aired on CBS on May 18, 1986.

== Plot ==
In 1880, a group of strangers boards the east-bound stagecoach from Tonto, Arizona Territory, to Lordsburg, New Mexico Territory. The travelers seem ordinary, but many have secrets from which they are running. Among them are Dallas, a prostitute, who is being driven out of town; an alcoholic dentist, Doc Holliday; pregnant Lucy Mallory, who is meeting her cavalry officer husband; and whiskey salesman Trevor Peacock. As the stage sets out, U.S. Cavalry Lieutenant Blanchard announces that Geronimo and his Apaches are on the warpath; his small troop will provide an escort to Dry Fork.

== Cast ==
- Willie Nelson as "Doc" Holliday
- Kris Kristofferson as Ringo / "Ringo Kid" / Bill Williams
- Johnny Cash as Marshal "Curly" Wilcox
- Waylon Jennings as Hatfield, Gambler
- John Schneider as Buck, Overland Stage Driver
- Elizabeth Ashley as Dallas
- Anthony Newley as Trevor Peacock, Old John's Whiskey Salesman
- Tony Franciosa as Henry Gatewood, Tonto Banker
- Merritt Butrick as Lieutenant Blanchard
- Mary Crosby as Mrs. Lucy Mallory
- June Carter Cash as Mrs. Pickett
- John Carter Cash as Billy Pickett
- Jessi Colter as Martha
- Lash LaRue as "Lash"

== Production ==
=== Writing ===
The plot is roughly based on that of the original film, but some character changes were made:

- The "Doc" character is Doc Boone, M.D., in the original, but is Doc Holliday - a dentist - in the remake.
- In the original, Peacock, the whiskey salesman, travels all the way to Lordsburg, but leaves the coach at the first stop in the remake.
- Hatfield, the gambler, is killed in the original, but in the remake, he survives.
- Gatewood, the banker, survives in the original, but is killed in the remake.
- Ringo deals with Luke Plummer alone in the original; in the remake, he is assisted by the marshal, Hatfield, and Doc.
- Ringo is still technically a jail-breaking criminal when the marshal allows him to escape in the original, but his innocence has been proven when Luke Plummer asks the marshal, "How'd they find out he didn't do it?" in the remake.

=== Filming ===
To save money, filming took place at Old Tucson Studios, which was used to film numerous Western films and television series.

== Awards and nominations ==
=== Won ===
- Western Heritage Awards 1987: Bronze Wrangler for Fictional Television Drama
  - Raymond Katz (executive producer)
  - Willie Nelson (executive producer/actor)
  - Waylon Jennings (actor)
  - Kris Kristofferson (actor)
  - Johnny Cash (actor)
  - Elizabeth Ashley (actress)

=== Nominated ===
- American Cinema Editors, USA 1987 for Best Edited Television Special
  - Geoffrey Rowland
