= A. J. Carothers =

American dramatist

- Born: October 22, 1931; Houston, Texas, United States
- Died: April 9, 2007 (aged 75); Los Angeles, California, United States
- Occupations: Screenwriter, playwright

A. J. Carothers (October 22, 1931 – April 9, 2007) was an American playwright and television writer, best known for his work with Walt Disney.

== Life and career ==
Born in Houston, Texas on October 22, 1931, Carothers was older than his two siblings, Gibson and Lesley. He sold his first story, a murder mystery, to a classmate when he was 9 for 15 cents. After an Army stint in Panama – where he helped create the first television station in the Caribbean – he returned to Los Angeles to pursue his career in 1957. During his career, he wrote more than 100 motion pictures, television shows, and plays. His final works included writing the book for the Sherman Brothers stage musical Busker Alley which toured the U.S. in 1996, and was produced in November, 2006, by the York Theater Festival, and Two Can Play, which enjoyed successful runs in Kansas City and Virginia.

Carothers also wrote speeches for Nancy Reagan, John Ritter, Patrick Stewart, John Lithgow and many others. He wrote the scripts for the Music Center Spotlight Awards from its 1995 inception through 2006.

Carothers garnered many honors, including the Distinguished Artists Award given by the Los Angeles Music Center, numerous Box Office Blue Ribbon awards, and The Kinkaid School Distinguished Alumnus award. He was a member of The Academy of Motion Picture Arts and Sciences and served on its Writers Executive Committee, as well as The Writers Guild of America. The Los Angeles Times named him "Father of the Year" in 1967.

== Personal life and death ==
Carothers was married to Caryl Carothers for 47 years, and had three sons, Christopher, Cameron, and Andrew. In his later years, Carothers was diagnosed with cancer, which eventually took his life on April 9, 2007.

== Major screenwriting credits ==
- Miracle of the White Stallions (1963) also known as The Flight of the White Stallions (UK)
- Emil and the Detectives (1964)
- The Happiest Millionaire (1967) (screenplay)
- Never a Dull Moment (1968)
- Hero at Large (1980) - Stage Director
- The Secret of My Success (1987) (screenplay) (story)

== Major television writing credits ==
- Studio One (1948) TV Series (writer)
- The Third Man Episode: "The Man Who Died Twice" (1959) (as A.J. Carothers)
- Bourbon Street Beat (1959) TV Series (writer)
- My Three Sons (5 episodes, 1961–1962) TV series (writer)
- Nanny and the Professor (1970) TV Series (creator) (writer) (executive script consultant) (executive story consultant)
- Goldilocks (1971)
- Miss Stewart, Sir (1972) (TV) (as A.J. Carothers)
- Topper Returns (1973) (TV) (as A.J. Carothers)
- Forever (1978) (TV)
- The Thief of Baghdad (1978) (TV)
- Disneyland TV serial episodes including: "Never a Dull Moment" (1979); "Emil and the Detectives: Part 1" (1966), "Emil and the Detectives: Part 2" (1966); Flight of the White Stallions: Part 1" (1965) TV Episode (writer) "Flight of the White Stallions: Part 2" (1965) TV Episode (writer)
- Summer Girl (1983) (TV) also known as The Hands That Rob the Cradle
- Goodnight, Beantown (1983) (TV) including the pilot episode and the "Custody" episode
- Making of a Male Model (1983) (TV)

== Film credits ==
Year	Title	Role	Notes
1980	Hero at Large	Stage Director	
