= Border Shootout =

1990 film

- Theatrical release poster
- Directed by: Chris McIntyre
- Written by: Elmore Leonard
- Starring: Glenn Ford
- Release date: 1990
- Country: United States
- Language: English

Border Shootout (also known as Law at Randado) is a 1990 Western film starring Glenn Ford as Sheriff John Danaher, who returns to a town to enforce justice.

== Cast ==
- Glenn Ford as Sheriff John Danaher
- Michael Ansara as Chuluha
- Michael Forest as Earl Beaudry
- Russell Todd as Clay Jordan
- Michael Horse as Dandy Jim
- Cody Glenn as Kirby Frye
- Charlene Tilton as Edith Hanasain
