= Don Starr =

American actor

- Born: Donald Starr; September 20, 1917; Riverside, California, US
- Died: July 11, 1995 (aged 77); Tucson, Arizona, US
- Other name: Donn Starr
- Occupation: Actor
- Years active: 1968–1991
- Spouse(s): Alyce "Molly' Harnish (1942–1977, divorced, 2 sons 1 daughter); Beverly Kunst (1983–1995, his death)

Donald Starr (September 20, 1917 – July 11, 1995) was an American actor who became known for his recurring role as oil baron Jordan Lee in the CBS-TV primetime soap opera series Dallas.

== Life and career ==
Starr was born and raised in Riverside, California; he studied acting in 1938–39 under scholarship at the Pasadena (Calif.) Community Playhouse. He served as an officer and a medical administrator with the U.S. Army from 1945–48 and earned an associate degree in 1950 at the University of Texas.

The next year, he took a job as an assistant administrator at Scott and White Memorial Hospital in Temple, Texas. He came to Tucson in 1956 to accept a position as business manager of the Tucson Clinic, retiring from that job in 1977. During his time living in Tucson, he served as a volunteer in several capacities, including president and board member of the Tucson Association for Child Care – a group he helped found. He would also serve as president of the United Community Campaign, secretary of the American College of Clinic Managers, and president of the Tucson Rotary Club.

He is best known for his portrayal of oil baron Jordan Lee in the soap opera Dallas. Other television credits include: The High Chaparral, Little House on the Prairie, The Rockford Files, Charlie's Angels, The Incredible Hulk, Knots Landing, V: The Final Battle, Hill Street Blues and L.A. Law.

Starr also made numerous notable film appearances, such as his role as Judge Mark Brandler in the film The Life and Times of Judge Roy Bean (1972), Speedtrap (1977), and The Onion Field (1979).

== Personal life ==
Starr married Mary Alyce "Molly' Harnish in 1942. The couple were divorced in 1977. They had two sons, Grant and Clay and daughter, Laurie. He then married the former Beverly Kunst in 1983, the couple returned to Tucson after "Dallas' ended its long network run.

== Death ==
Starr died at his home in Tucson, Arizona on July 11, 1995, from injuries after a fall.

== Filmography ==
| Year | Title | Role | Notes |
|---|---|---|---|
| 1972 | Night of the Lepus | Cutler | |
| 1972 | The Life and Times of Judge Roy Bean | Opera House Mgr. | |
| 1974 | Alice Doesn't Live Here Anymore | Diner at Mel & Ruby's | Uncredited |
| 1976 | Hawmps! | Major Bill Haney | |
| 1977 | Another Man, Another Chance | Bank Director | Uncredited |
| 1979 | The Onion Field | Judge Mark Brandner | |
| 1984 | The Bear | Alabama Alumni | |
| 1988 | Bird | Doctor at Nica's | |
| 1990 | Kid | Bleeker | |
| 1990 | Border Shootout | Haig Hanasain | |
