= Victoria Principal =

American actress (born 1950)

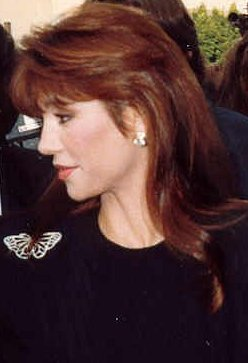
- Principal in 1987
- Born: Vicki Ree Principal; January 3, 1950 (age 76); Fukuoka, Japan
- Occupations: Actress; producer; entrepreneur; author
- Years active: 1972–present (acting); 1987–present (producer and entrepreneur)
- Spouses: Christopher Skinner (m. 1978; div. 1981) Harry Glassman (m. 1985; div. 2006)

Vicki Ree Principal (born January 3, 1950), later known as Victoria Principal, is an American actress, producer, entrepreneur, and author, best known for her role as Pamela Barnes Ewing on the American primetime television soap opera Dallas. She spent nine years on the long-running series, leaving in 1987. Afterwards, she opened her own production company, Victoria Principal Productions, focusing mostly on television films. In the mid-1980s, she became interested in natural beauty therapies, and in 1989, she created an eponymous line of skincare products, Principal Secret.

Principal became a best-selling author, writing three books about beauty, skincare, fitness, well-being, and health: The Body Principal (1983), The Beauty Principal (1984), and The Diet Principal (1987). In the 2001, she wrote a fourth book, Living Principal. She is also a two-time Golden Globe Award nominee.

== Early life ==
Vicki Ree Principal was born on January 3, 1950 in Fukuoka, Japan, the elder daughter of United States Air Force sergeant Victor Rocco Principal and Bertha Ree Principal (née Veal). She spent her first three months of life in Japan.

Because her father was in the U.S. military, the family moved often. She grew up in London, Puerto Rico, Florida, Massachusetts, and Warner Robins, Georgia, among other places. She attended 17 different schools, including the Royal Ballet School while her family was stationed in England.

Principal began her career in TV commercials, appearing in her first at age 5. After graduating from South Dade Senior High School in 1968, she enrolled at Miami–Dade Community College, intending to study medicine. However, months before completing her first year of studies, she was seriously injured in a car crash while driving home from the library. The other driver was convicted of drunk driving and served jail time. Principal spent months in recovery and was faced with the prospect of having to retake her first year of studies. After serious introspection, she drastically changed course by moving to New York City to pursue acting, and shortly thereafter to Europe. She studied privately with Jean Scott (professor at the Royal Academy of Dramatic Art) in London, and in 1971 moved to Los Angeles.

== Career ==
=== Early acting ===
Principal won her first film role as Marie Elena, a Mexican mistress, in John Huston's The Life and Times of Judge Roy Bean (1972) (opposite Paul Newman), for which she earned a Golden Globe nomination as Most Promising Newcomer. On the basis of the positive response to Principal's acting work, her role was enlarged by writer John Milius. During this period, Warren Cowan flew in, introduced himself to Principal, and offered to represent her free-of-charge for the next year. She went to Arizona as an unknown; when she returned to Los Angeles three months later, the commercial flight she was on was greeted by paparazzi. She then had a starring role in the risqué comedy film The Naked Ape (1973), which was co-financed by Hugh Hefner, the founder and publisher of Playboy magazine. She appeared nude in the September 1973 issue of Playboy to promote the film. The film failed at the box office, which was a disappointment to her.

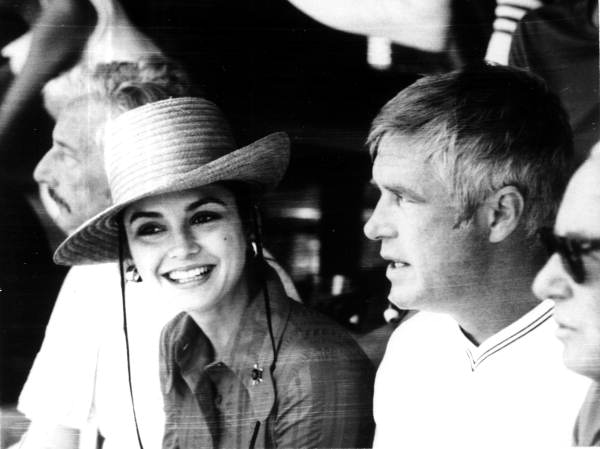
Principal and George Peppard, c. 1970

In 1974, she was cast in the blockbuster disaster film Earthquake. Principal won the supporting role of Rosa Amici, beating out both Susan Sarandon and Kay Lenz for the part. Prior to her third callback audition, she opted to cut her then waist-length brown hair, and have it styled into an Afro. Director Mark Robson was stunned, but impressed by Principal's risky transformation and dedication to look closer to the character. The film went on to become one of the era's highest-grossing films and received four Academy Award nominations and two Golden Globe nominations. She continued to act in lesser-known films such as I Will, I Will... for Now and Vigilante Force. Principal signed a three-picture deal with Brut Productions.

=== Behind the scenes, transition, and return to acting ===
Principal decided to leave acting and became a Hollywood talent agent and booking agent, which was her profession from 1975 to late 1977. She then had ambitions to study at law school and would support herself if needed through small acting roles on television and film, so as to fund her future college tuition. In 1976, she returned to her character in Earthquake by shooting additional scenes to expand the running time of the original picture for the broadcast premiere of that film. In 1977, television producer Aaron Spelling offered Principal a role in the pilot of his television series Fantasy Island, which aired on the ABC network, and she accepted. She also appeared in the 1977 television film The Night They Took Miss Beautiful on the NBC network.

=== Dallas TV series ===
When Principal obtained the pilot audition script for Dallas, her academic career ambitions changed, and she decided to return to the full-time acting profession. As Principal explained to TV Guide Network in 2004, "I had left acting to be an agent and was on my way to law school, but when a friend dropped off a Dallas script, I read it. When I finished, I knew my life had changed - that part was mine. So I called the [casting] person and said, "I'm sending someone in." She said, "Who?" I said, "Just put down my name. It will be a surprise." And it certainly was a surprise - I showed up with me! I sent myself in for it!" Principal landed the role of Pamela Barnes Ewing on the long-running prime time TV soap opera Dallas that aired on the CBS network from 1978 to 1991. Principal explained to People in 2018, "When I went in for the part on Dallas, I had already fallen in love with the show and with the part. So my feeling from the moment I read it was that it was incredibly special and that I really, really wanted to be a part of it. I could not imagine not being Pam." As Principal told TV Insider in 2018, "I believed that Dallas would be a hit from the moment I read it. In fact, I turned down a major role that would have conflicted with Dallas in the belief that I would be offered the role of Pam. So that happened!"

Principal was her own manager in contract negotiations with CBS and Lorimar Productions, which produced Dallas. When Principal signed her Dallas contract, she removed the clause that would have given the network the right to consent and profit from her outside endeavors. She explained, "As a result that's why, you can only notice in hindsight, I was the only person in the cast who did commercials, who was doing movies of the week, who wrote books and these all belong to me. I retained the control and ownership of my image. No one owns me."

Dallas became a global phenomenon with the 1980 "Who shot J.R.?" cliffhanger mystery reveal. At the time, it was the highest-rated aired television episode in American history. Titled "Who Done It" the episode is the fourth episode in the fourth season (1980–1981) of Dallas, and remains the second highest rated prime-time telecast ever.

In 1981, Principal appeared on the song "All I Have to Do Is Dream" with her then/boyfriend singer Andy Gibb. The single reached #51 on the US Hot 100 chart.

In 1983, Principal earned her second Golden Globe nomination, this time as Best Actress in a Television Series for Dallas. Principal took to other ways of improving her character, such as taking voice lessons for a better Texas accent.

Principal's character Pamela Ewing's relationship with Patrick Duffy's character, Bobby Ewing, was one of the major components of the series. Duffy's character, however, was killed off. When Duffy returned to Dallas in 1986, after being killed off a year earlier, the entire previous year was written by the show's writers as a dream that Pam had. Being told that the entire previous year was nothing more than a dream that one of the characters had didn't go over very well with some of the show's fans. Consequently, that season of Dallas is sometimes known as the show's "dream season" as the entire ninth season was only Pam's dream.

In 2018, recalling the first days of filming on the Dallas set in 1978, Principal told TV Insider, "What I remember most about the first day of shooting Dallas was an unexpected feeling of déjà vu. Everything was new to me; I was nervous, and yet I felt strangely sure that I was where I was supposed to be and with the people I was supposed to be with as though this had happened before. I remember looking at Patrick [Duffy] when he did not know it and thinking, 'this is a nice person.' And that made falling into his arms and our love scenes that day so much easier and natural.

Describing the on-screen relationship between Principal and Duffy, or Bobby and Pam, Duffy stated to The Huffington Post in 2017, "We had great chemistry on the show and that just fell into place. It was the luckiest bit of casting, I think, that has occurred in a long time on television. Everybody was absolutely perfect for the parts they played. For a Romeo and Juliet basically subject matter for Bobby and Pam, we were absolutely the most comfortable two actors when we were working together. Victoria had a wonderful sense of humor. We could just go crazy between takes and then get right back into the moment.

Over the course of her nine-year run on Dallas, Principal found worldwide fame. Principal left Dallas in 1987, after a two-year decision to prepare with the series' producers for the final season of her character's arc. However, as an actress, she intentionally worked on separating her own persona from that of her on-screen character, as she explained in 1987 to The New York Times in an interview during her final week of shooting on the Dallas set, "A lot of work has gone into keeping Victoria Principal separate from Pam Ewing. To stay on the show any longer would really seal my fate in the industry."

Reflecting on her time at Dallas, Principal stated to People in 2018, "At year seven, it was time for me to renegotiate my contract and I was very candid about my concern and my disappointment, that we had had such good writing and so many wonderful plots, and that when the time came to renegotiate the writers' contracts, I felt that a number of writers had left because they had not gotten the right deal." As she further explained to Entertainment Weekly in 2018, "The first five years on Dallas were so unbelievably wonderful — then some key writers departed, and by year seven there was a decline in the writing, which was an enormous part of my decision to leave. I informed the producers during renegotiations in the seventh year that I would only stay for two more. They wanted a longer contract, and I said no. I was completely transparent. I learned a lot from playing Pam. She was someone with such innate goodness and who was courageous in fighting for what she believed in. It was really a privilege to play her."

=== 1987–present ===
Principal went on to star in various television films, some of which she produced through her production company Victoria Principal Productions, before stepping away to focus on her health and wellness projects. She has produced and starred in a half dozen major television productions, including Naked Lie (1989), Blind Witness (1989), and Sparks: The Price of Passion (1990).

In 1994, Principal appeared in an episode of the hit TV sitcom Home Improvement. Through the late 1990s and in 2000, she continued to appear as a guest star on several TV sitcoms and primetime drama series, including Just Shoot Me!, Family Guy, Providence, and The Practice, as well as appearing as herself on the comedy skit show Tracey Takes On....

In 1998, Principal co-starred in the French comedy feature film, Michael Kael vs. the World News Company, written by and starring Benoît Delépine. The cast included Marine Delterme, Mickey Rooney, Elliott Gould, William Atherton, and Féodor Atkine. The plot centers on a journalist who disrupts the cynical collusion between a CNN-type entity and covert operators in Washington in 1999, at Miami-based international news giant corporation WNC, where star co-anchors Leila Parker (Principal) and James Denit (Atherton) hate each other's guts. Their boss, Coogan (Gould), reminds them they pull in top ratings as a pair.

Principal returned to primetime soap-opera television in 2000, when she appeared in another Aaron Spelling production, the short-lived NBC television series Titans, with co-stars John Barrowman, Perry King, and Yasmine Bleeth. Thirteen episodes were filmed, of which 11 were actually aired. Produced by Spelling, the series was initially marketed as a "Dynasty for the new millennium," attempting to emulate the style of Spelling's earlier hit series. However, low ratings led NBC to cancel the series before its first season was completed.

After appearing in NBC's Titans, Principal dedicated her time fully to her skincare company and to philanthropic activities, as she confirmed to People in 2018, "By the time I turned 50, I felt that I wanted to make a change in my life" — she says, of ultimately leaving Hollywood after 2001 — 'My interest had shifted in such a way that would totally pursue my passion, which more and more really was my skincare company and creating products that could help many people."

In 2004, Principal featured along with other original Dallas cast members in Dallas Reunion: The Return to Southfork, a television special celebrating the 1978–1991 primetime series that aired on CBS.

=== Music ===
Principal recorded a pop single duet with Andy Gibb, titled "All I Have to Do Is Dream" (1981). The recording is a cover version of the original song by the Everly Brothers, written by husband-and-wife songwriting team Felice and Boudleaux Bryant (credited solely to Boudleaux), The Gibb/Principal 1981 duet song was released on RSO Records in August 1981. The single peaked at number 51 on the US Billboard Hot 100 on September 12, 1981. The song was Gibb's last charting single, and the only single recorded by Principal.

== Entrepreneur ==
When asked about the benefits of her entrepreneurial success — her skincare empire, best-selling author, television and film producer — Principal stated to The Huffington Post in 2012, that it is "Working for myself and being willing to take all of the blame when things go wrong and happy to take the credit when I get it right."

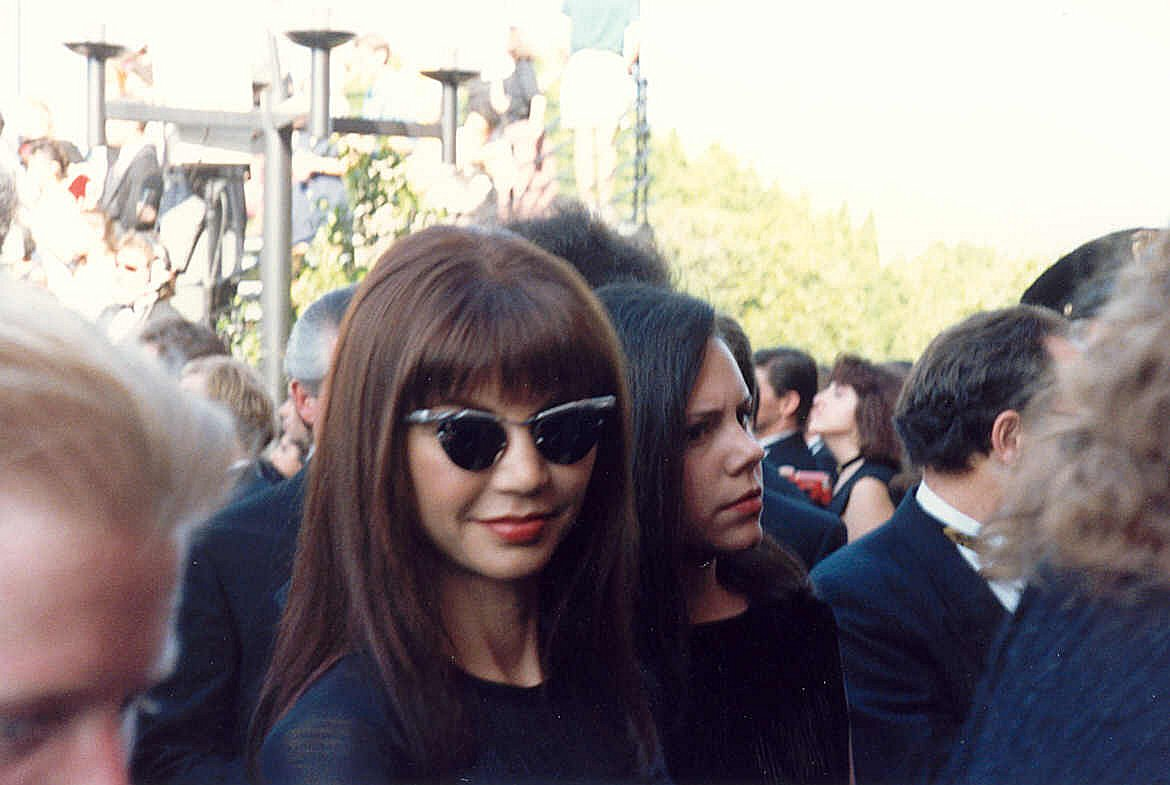
Principal at the 1993 Emmy Awards

=== Victoria Principal Productions ===
After Principal left the Dallas TV series in 1987, she began her own production company, Victoria Principal Productions, producing mostly television films. Principal went on to star in various television films, some of which she produced through her production company, before stepping away to focus on her health and wellness projects. She has produced and starred in a half dozen major television productions, including Naked Lie (1989), Blind Witness (1989), and Sparks: The Price of Passion (1990).

=== Principal Secret Skincare ===
In the mid-1980s, Principal became interested in natural-beauty therapies, and in 1989, she created a self-named line of skincare products, Principal Secret. Over the past 25 years, Principal has built her skincare empire. In 2000, Principal became a member of the Society of Cosmetic Chemists (SCC). The SCC is dedicated to the advancement of cosmetic science, and strives to increase and disseminate scientific information through meetings and publications. In January 2011, she launched a line of jewelry called Keys & Hearts available on the same site as her skincare line.

In August 2013, the CEO of Guthy Renker revealed to Women's Wear Daily that Principal's business, Principal Secret Skincare, had revenue of more than $1.5 billion to date, an increase of more than a half-billion dollars over the revenue up to 2007. As Principal told TV Insider in 2018, "I continue to be passionately dedicated to running my skincare company, Principal Secret. We are about to celebrate 27 years in business. And I have never forgotten that Dallas gave me the springboard to achieve so many of my dreams.".

In April 2019, Principal announced that she was stepping away from Principal Secret with Guthy Renker acquiring the business. Principal announced that she would be focusing on her foundation The Victoria Principal Foundation for Thoughtful Existence.

== Books ==
In the 1980s, Principal became a best-selling author, writing three books about beauty, skincare, fitness, well-being and, health: The Body Principal (1983); The Beauty Principal (1984); and The Diet Principal (1987). In the 2000s, she wrote a fourth book Living Principal (2001). After 12 weeks on The New York Times Best Seller list in the general non-fiction category, The Body Principal was the first "Advice, How-To, and Miscellaneous" No. 1 bestseller when that List debuted January 1, 1984.

== Awards ==
Principal is a two-time Golden Globe Award nominee: 1973, nominee for Most Promising Newcomer — Female: The Life and Times of Judge Roy Bean; and 1983, nominee for Best Performance by an Actress in a Television Series — Drama: Dallas.

In 1981 and 1982, Principal was the recipient of the "Bravo Otto" Award, a German accolade honoring excellence of performers in film, television, and music. She was also a nominee for the award in 1983.

In 1993, Principal received an honorary law degree from the University of West Los Angeles School of Law.

In 1995, Principal was named Entertainment Business Woman of the Year by the National Association of Women Business Owners.

In 1999, Principal became the youngest recipient of the Genii Lifetime Achievement Award for Women in Television.

In 2003, a Golden Palm Star on the Palm Springs, California, Walk of Stars was dedicated to Principal's career.

In 2004, she received an honorary degree from Drexel University's Business School and gave the commencement address.

On October 2, 2010, Principal was honored at the opening of Legacy Park in Malibu near the Pacific Coast Highway as a founding member of the park back in 2004. Over a 12-year period, she served the Arthritis Foundation as honorary chairman and ambassador to government.

== Personal life ==
Principal has been married and divorced twice, and has no children. During the filming of The Life and Times of Judge Roy Bean (1972), she dated actor Anthony Perkins, who lost his virginity to her. In the mid-1970s, she also dated filmmaker Steven Spielberg.

Her first marriage was to writer-producer Christopher Skinner, whom she met in 1978 when he played a bit acting part on Dallas. The couple wed soon after beginning their relationship. They filed for divorce two years later in 1980; it was finalized in 1981.

Principal had a high-profile relationship with English-Australian singer-songwriter Andy Gibb. The pair met on The John Davidson Show in January 1981 and had immediate chemistry. They celebrated their love in a duet song, "All I Have to Do Is Dream" (1981), a modest pop-chart hit that peaked at number 51 on the Billboard Hot 100 on September 12, 1981. The recording was the last single by Gibb, and is the only single recorded by Principal. The relationship ended in March 1982, due to Gibb's escalating drug addiction problems. After Gibb's death in 1988, Principal explained to People, "Our breakup was preceded and precipitated by Andy's use of drugs." She clarified, "I did everything I could to help him, but then I told him he would have to choose between me and his problem."

Principal met prominent Beverly Hills plastic surgeon Dr. Harry Glassman in 1983. They married on June 22, 1985, in Dallas, Texas, when Principal was seven years into her role on Dallas. The couple lived in Beverly Hills. In May 2006, Principal filed for divorce, citing irreconcilable differences. The couple divorced in December 2006, with Principal stating, "We have had a loving relationship for over 20 years."

Principal later moved to Malibu, California. She owns properties in Big Sur, California, and Switzerland.

In 2007, Principal showed interest in training for her booked flight on Richard Branson's commercial space flight venture, the galactic passage ticket which she purchased in 2009. Principal stated, "Going into space fulfills many desires I have of seeing the planet, going fast, going someplace very few people have been—and hopefully coming back down!" In 2012, Principal withdrew from the Branson-led program.

Since 2012, Principal has developed a ranch property outside of Los Angeles, where she rescues and rehabilitates animals.

== Philanthropy ==
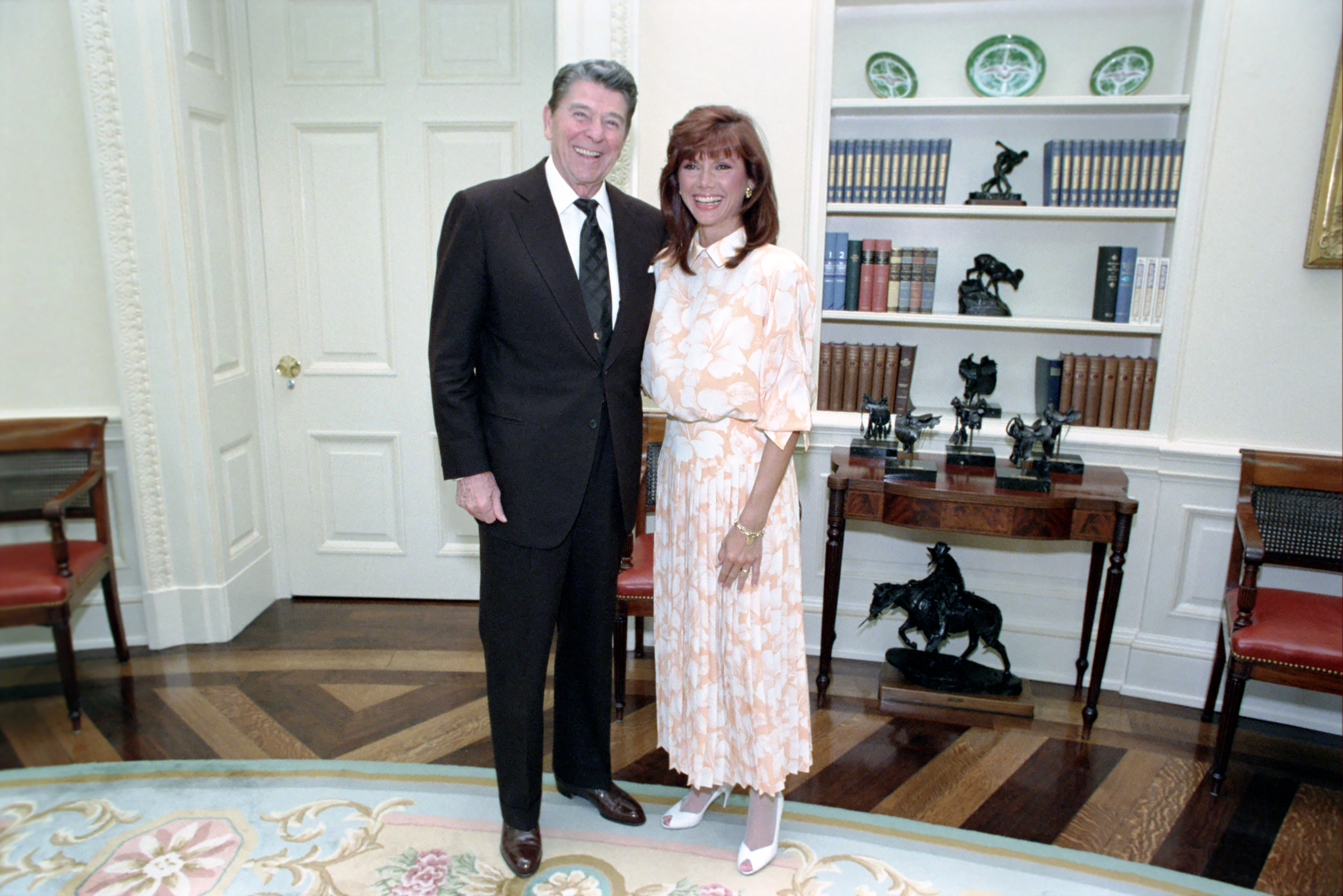
Principal with President Ronald Reagan in 1986

Principal told The Huffington Post in 2012, "My deepest concern is for the planet and every living thing on it. Without a healthy planet, education won't matter, hunger won't matter, and science won't matter because we will not survive. Unless we rectify the damage we have done to our land and our oceans, then I truly believe, the planet will reclaim itself.

In 2006, Principal formed a charitable organization, the Victoria Principal Foundation For Thoughtful Existence, to help subsidize the environmental movement, of which she had been an active participant since 1978. The impetus of the foundation is to help financially support the planet and life upon it. Principal is particularly involved with ecology, oceans, banning toxic substances, helping children, and rescuing and rehabilitating animals. She provided aid those in need after the 2008 California wildfires. On June 2, 2010, she donated $200,000 to the cleanup effort in the Gulf Coast region. Her donations brought together two huge environmental nonprofits, Oceana and Natural Resources Defense Council (NRDC), to work together on the cleanup.

Principal appeared with other celebrities on June 21, 2010, in a CNN Larry King–sponsored telethon to support the Gulf Coast region following the Deepwater Horizon explosion. Principal was on a panel with King, answered phones, and spoke to donors for the entire two hours. The telethon raised over $1.8 million.

Principal is a former co-chairman of Victory Over Violence, the LA County Domestic Violence Council Community Advisory Board. The board is a coalition of representatives from the entertainment industry, business, government, and community who have come together with the dual purposes of increasing public awareness of issues surrounding domestic violence and increasing shelter and victim resources.

On December 13, 2011, Principal donated a substantial sum to the nonprofit marine conservation organization Oceana, and to NRDC to stop the expansion of offshore drilling in the Gulf of Mexico and the Arctic Ocean, fearing such activity could lead to another disastrous oil spill. On December 20, 2011, the Giving Back Fund named Principal as one of the Top 30 Celebrity Charity Donors for 2011.

In 2012, Principal funded and participated in an online campaign with the NRDC in an effort to stop sonic blasting along the California coastline and prevent the deaths of hundreds of marine mammals and marine life. In 2012, she funded, through Tree People, the creation of a mobile emergency fire warning system for the Los Angeles area. In 2013, this system was completed and implemented, the first of its kind in California.

In 2013, Principal funded an ad bringing awareness to the plight of sea lion pups washing up along the California coastline and provided funds to Wildlife Org. for their rescue and rehabilitation.

In 2013, after the deadly Moore, Oklahoma, EF5 tornado, Principal funded the American Humane Association's famous Red Star Rescue Team to help search, rescue, and shelter injured and missing animals with the ultimate goal of reuniting them with their families. In August 2013, she funded in collaboration with Tree People a new mobile system that allows citizens to participate in critical wildfire prevention by texting.

In July 2014, Principal made a substantial contribution to NRDC's campaign for Save the Bees. She stated, "As of yesterday, I've now made a substantial donation and joined in support of the NRDC's campaign for Save the Bees. Without bees, our fruit- and vegetable-bearing plants and trees will cease to be productive." In August 2014, she fully funded, with the help of Mission K9 rescue, the return of military working dog Maxi from Japan to the United States to be reunited with her former Marine handler. Two months later, she donated $100,000 to support Malibu ballot initiative Measure R, which sought to limit the environmental impact of development in Malibu by requiring a vote on any new developments over 20,000 square feet. In November, the initiative was passed by voters.

In May 2015, Principal fully funded the Red Star Rescue Team of the American Humane Association for the rescue and rehabilitation of 150 dogs that had been injured and displaced by tornadoes and floods in Oklahoma and Texas. The following year, she created the Moki fund to help rescue animals and provide medical care so that they can be adopted into permanent homes. In August 2016, Principal worked with the American Red Cross to provide shelter and food for the victims of the 2016 Louisiana floods, as well as the American Humane Association to help rescue and shelter animals that were displaced in Louisiana and attempt to reunite them with their owners.

In April 2018, Principal announced that she will double the impact of individual gifts by matching donations to Oceana, up to $50,000 to help protect U.S. coasts from the dangers of offshore oil and gas. Explaining her commitment, Principal has stated, "Oceana successfully protected much of the Atlantic and Arctic from new drilling in the past, but now those protections are at risk. Oceana knows how to win victories for our oceans, and I am making this commitment to encourage people across the country to join me in the fight to protect our coasts."

In September 2018, Principal donated a fleet of rescue boats to help American Humane with animal disaster relief efforts in the Carolinas after Hurricane Florence.

== Filmography ==
=== Film ===
Year	Title	Role	Notes
1972	The Life and Times of Judge Roy Bean	Maria Elena	Nominated - Golden Globe Award for Most Promising Newcomer - Female
1973	The Naked Ape	Cathy	
1974	Earthquake	Rosa Amici	
1976	I Will, I Will... for Now	Jackie Martin	
1976	Vigilante Force	Linda Christopher	
1998	Michael Kael vs. the World News Company	Leila Parker	

=== Television ===
Year	Title	Role	Notes
1973	Love, American Style	Valerie Stephens	2 episodes
1973	Love Story	Karen	Episode: "When the Girls Came Out to Play"
1974	Banacek	Brooke Collins	Episode: "Fly Me- If You Can Find Me"
1975	Last Hours Before Morning	Yolanda Marquez	TV movie
1977	Fantasy Island	Michelle	Pilot episode
1977	The Night They Took Miss Beautiful	Reba Bar Lev	TV movie
1978–1987	Dallas	Pamela Barnes Ewing	Series regular, 251 episodes Nominated - Golden Globe Award for Best Actress – Television Series Drama (1983); Nominated - Soap Opera Digest Award for Outstanding Actress in a Leading Role on a Prime Time Serial (1986); Nominated - Soap Opera Digest Award for Favorite Super Couple: Prime Time (1988)
1979	Greatest Heroes of the Bible	Queen Esther	Episode: "The Story of Esther"
1979	Hawaii Five-O	Dolores Kent Sandover	Episode: "The Year of the Horse"
1980	Pleasure Palace	Patti Flynn	TV movie
1982	Not Just Another Affair	Dr. Diana Dawson	TV movie
1982	Fridays	Herself	Live TV comedy variety show. ABC
1987	Mistress	Rae Colton	TV movie
1989	Naked Lie	Joanne Dawson	TV movie
1989	Blind Witness	Maggie Kemlich	TV movie
1990	Sparks: The Price of Passion	Patricia Sparks	TV movie
1991	Don't Touch My Daughter	Linda	TV movie
1992	The Burden of Proof	Margy Allison	TV movie
1992	Seduction: Three Tales from the 'Inner Sanctum'	Patty/Sylvia/Joan/Lisa	TV movie
1993	River of Rage: The Taking of Maggie Keene	Maggie Keene	TV movie
1994	Beyond Obsession	Eleanor DiCarlo	TV movie
1994	Home Improvement	Les Thompson	Episode: "Swing Time"
1995	Dancing in the Dark	Anna Forbes	TV movie
1996	The Abduction	Kate Finley	TV movie
1997	Love in Another Town	Maggie Sorrell	TV movie
1999	Tracey Takes On...	Herself	Episode: "Erotica"
1999	Just Shoot Me!	Roberta	Episode: "Love Is in the Air"
1999–2001	Jack & Jill	Mrs. Cecilia Barrett	3 episodes
1999, 2000	Family Guy	Pamela Ewing/Dr. Amanda Rebecca	Episodes: "Da Boom", "Road to Rhode Island"
2000	Providence	Donna Tupperman	3 episodes
2000	The Practice	Courtney Hansen	Episode: "Black Widows"
2000–2001	Titans	Gwen Williams	Series regular, 13 episodes
2004	Dallas Reunion: The Return to Southfork	Herself / Pamela Barnes Ewing	TV special

== Books ==
- The Body Principal. New York: Simon and Schuster. 1983. ISBN 0-671-46684-4.
- The Beauty Principal. New York: Simon and Schuster, 1984; ISBN 0-671-49643-3.
- The Diet Principal. New York: Simon and Schuster, 1987; ISBN 0-671-53082-8.
- Living Principal: Looking and Feeling Your Best at Every Age. New York: Villard, 2001; ISBN 0-375-50488-5.
