= Kristin Shepard =

- Dallas character
- Mary Crosby as Kristin Shepard
- Portrayed by: Colleen Camp (1979); Mary Crosby (1979–1981, 1991)
- Duration: 1979–1981, 1991
- First appearance: January 14, 1979; For Love or Money
- Last appearance: May 3, 1991; Conundrum (Part 2)
- Created by: David Jacobs
- Spin-off appearances: Knots Landing
In-universe information
- Occupation: Secretary for Ewing Oil
- Mother: Patricia Shepard
- Sisters: Sue Ellen Ewing
- Spouse: Jeff Farraday (1981)
- Sons: Christopher Ewing
- Nephews: John Ross Ewing III

Kristin Marie Shepard is a fictional character on the American television series Dallas, played by Mary Crosby (1979–1981) and, briefly, by Colleen Camp (1979). The character also made one appearance on Dallas's spin-off series, Knots Landing, during its second season.

== Character background ==
Kristin was Sue Ellen Ewing's attractive but scheming younger sister, who later has an affair with Sue Ellen's husband, J.R.

== Storylines ==
The character of Kristin first appeared on Dallas during the second season in the company of her mother, Patricia Shepard (Martha Scott). Patricia was always proud that her daughter, former beauty pageant winner Sue Ellen (Linda Gray), had married into the prominent Ewing family. Patricia was hoping her younger daughter Kristin (then portrayed by Colleen Camp) would also find a successful man to marry. Kristin spent some time at Southfork Ranch and J.R. (Larry Hagman) came up with a plan for Kristin to seduce Bobby. (Bobby had just recently separated from his new bride Pam, and J.R. was plotting to break them up for good.); J.R.'s plan backfired. Bobby wasn't interested in Kristin romantically and nothing happened. Bobby and Pam reconciled. Kristin left town for a while.

Kristin returned to Dallas at the beginning of the third season (now portrayed by Mary Crosby). J.R. offered Kristin a job working for him at Ewing Oil and a condo for her to live in. Eventually, J.R. and Kristin began a long term affair. Kristin helped J.R. by finding out valuable information from J.R.'s business partners. J.R. failed to come through on the promises he made to Kristin that she would be rewarded for the spying she had done, being that he would marry her. Kristin became bitter with J.R., feeling he had betrayed her. J.R. had also managed to anger many of his business partners and family members. J.R. was shot by an unknown assailant at the end of Dallas's third season.

Early in the fourth season, Sue Ellen (falsely accused of shooting J.R.) realized that her sister Kristin had shot J.R. and the truth came out in a poolside conversation between the three of them. Before J.R. (in a wheelchair) had a chance to digest this news flash, Kristin revealed that she was pregnant with J.R.'s child. Instead of pressing charges against Kristin for the shooting, J.R. sent her packing out of town and agreed to send her a monthly check for living expenses.

At the end of the fourth season, Kristin returned yet again claiming to have given birth to her and J.R.'s son and wanting money. She is soon thereafter found drowned in the Southfork Ranch swimming pool. She had overdosed on drugs and, in her stupor, fell and hit her head and went over the balcony railing, landing in the pool. After Kristin's death, her son Christopher is adopted by Bobby and Pam Ewing. It was later revealed by Bobby that Kristin actually miscarried J.R.'s baby. Kristin then married petty criminal Jeff Farraday (who was the same blood type as J.R.) and gave birth to Christopher. She later returned to Dallas leading J.R. to believe Christopher was his son and trying to blackmail him, ultimately leading to her death.

Kristin made a final appearance in the series finale. In that episode, J.R. experiences visions of what the world would be like if he had never been born. In this setting, Kristin initially appears to be a prostitute, which J.R. finds predictable. She then informs her client that she is actually a police officer conducting a sting, at which J.R. is incredulous. The client then offers Kristin a large donation for the Police Benevolent Association if she will let him off, to which she agrees. After the man leaves, it is revealed that Kristin is actually a con artist, which gains J.R.'s approval.

== Knots Landing guest appearance ==
Before her last appearance on Dallas at the end of the fourth season, Kristin resurfaced on the Dallas spin-off series Knots Landing, appearing on the December 18, 1980, episode of the second season of Knots Landing. Kristin had been living in Los Angeles after leaving Dallas, and was arrested at a party while possessing drugs. She contacted Valene Ewing in an attempt to get out of jail and is invited to stay with Val and Gary, who is not happy to see her there knowing fully that Kristin was far more conniving than Sue Ellen, while she gets back on her feet. Kristin tried to form a relationship with the Ewings' neighbor Kenny Ward, who was separated from his wife Ginger at the time. Kristin and Kenny's relationship gets to a point to where Kenny takes Kristin to his home, only to have Ginger walk in on them while Kristin is attempting to seduce Kenny. Ginger promptly sued Kenny for divorce shortly thereafter. Kristin came clean and admitted that she was pregnant to Val and Gary, and said that she only tried to seduce Kenny in order to give her baby a father. The closing scene has Gary and Kristin talking about how they were both the black sheep of their families. Kristin leaves Knots Landing shortly afterwards. Not once during this episode, is it mentioned that she was responsible for the shooting of J.R., nor that the real father of her baby was J.R.
