= Burn Notice season 2 =

Burn Notice
- Season 2
- DVD cover
- No. of episodes: 16

Release
- Original network: USA Network
- Original release: July 10, 2008 – March 5, 2009

Season chronology
- ← Previous; Season 1 Next → Season 3

The second season of the American television action-drama series Burn Notice, created by Matt Nix and starring Jeffrey Donovan, Gabrielle Anwar, Bruce Campbell, and Sharon Gless, premiered July 10, 2008. The season was split into two parts, with episodes 1–9 airing in the summer of 2008 and episodes 10–16 being broadcast in early 2009.

A burn notice is a document issued by intelligence agencies to discredit or announce the dismissal of agents or sources who are considered to have become unreliable. The television series is a first-person narrative (including frequent stream of consciousness voice-overs providing nuggets of exposition) from the viewpoint of covert-operations agent Michael Westen, played by Jeffrey Donovan. Michael Westen often delivers tips on unrelated subject matters, such as on burglar-proofing houses or getting promoted during commercial breaks.

== Season overview ==
The second season of Burn Notice continues the plot lines of the first season. Michael Westen had struggled to find out why he had been burned and by whom. Westen continues his work as an unlicensed private investigator and freelance spy for anyone in town who can pay him any money to fund his investigation into his situation as a blacklisted agent. Westen battles and outwits an array of mobsters, con artists, contract killers, professional thieves, drug traffickers, arms dealers and kidnappers. Michael must also battle personal demons, chief among which is his relationship with Fiona.

Season 2 introduces a mysterious woman named "Carla" (Tricia Helfer), an agent of the organization behind Michael's burn notice who is now trying to get him to work for that organization. Although he resists, she assigns him various tasks (which he later learns are preparation for an assassination), while he also attempts to find out who she is. She often coerces him into working for her by threatening the people he cares about with violence. Midway through the season, Michael is almost assassinated by an unknown group. Carla gets the assignment to discover who placed the hit, as the mysterious assassin also killed the operative involved in her assassination, while Michael digs around for the mastermind to find what could be either a potential ally or a dangerous new enemy.

Carla's operation is sabotaged by a rogue agent in her organization, and Michael is assigned to find out who it was: Victor Stricker-Epps (Michael Shanks), another agent of the organization who was trying to destroy them from within after he learned that Carla had his wife and child killed as part of his recruitment. He also reveals that Carla is trying to kill them both because Victor has proof that Carla is corrupt: using the organization's resources for personal profit and to settle old vendettas, and Michael is helping him. At the end of Season 2, after Carla is killed by Fiona and Michael kills Victor in an act of mercy, he has an encounter with Carla's superior, simply known as "Management" (John Mahoney). Putting the pieces together, Michael realizes that Management falsified records to paint him as both corrupt and unreliable, forcing the government to burn him. When Michael demands Management leave him alone, Management complies. While it frees Michael from their grasp, it also removes the organization's protection, which now exposes Michael to police attention and allows enemies he made as a U.S. covert operative to track him down.

== Cast ==
Jeffrey Donovan returned as the still-burned spy Michael Westen. Gabrielle Anwar reprised her role as ex-IRA operative Fiona Glenanne, and Bruce Campbell returned as ex-Navy SEAL Sam Axe. Sharon Gless also returned, as Madeline Westen, Michael's mother.

The second season saw even more recurring guests than the first. The most prominent of these was Tricia Helfer, who appeared in many episodes as Michael's handler, Carla. Paul Tei also made several appearances returning as money-launderer Barry Burkowski. Seth Peterson returned as Michael's brother, Nate Westen. Michael Shanks was introduced as wrangler Victor Stecker-Epps. Silas Weir Mitchell made two appearances as the quirky arms dealer Seymour. Marc Macaulay and Brandon Morris returned for one episode as Agents Harris and Lane, two FBI agents who were formerly in charge of Michael's surveillance. Agent Jason Bly, another FBI agent, also returned for one episode, portrayed by Alex Carter. Gary Weeks made various appearances as Campbell, Fiona's boyfriend, while Audrey Landers made a single appearance in her previous role as Sam's girlfriend, Veronica. Virgil Watkins, a former client, made an appearance, portrayed by Chris Ellis. Various other characters were introduced, who later became important recurring characters. These included John Mahoney as Management, Tim Matheson as Michael's former mentor-turned-assassin "Dead" Larry Sizemore, and Jay Karnes as arms dealer Tyler Brennen. Notable one-time guest stars included Kevin Alejandro, Erick Avari, Rob Benedict, Assaf Cohen, Patrick Fabian, Oded Fehr, Method Man, Larry Miller, Amy Pietz, Clarence Williams III, and Fawad Siddiqui.

== Episodes ==
No. overall	No. in season	Title	Directed by	Written by	Original release date	Prod. code	US viewers (millions)
13	1	"Breaking and Entering"	Paul Holahan	Matt Nix	July 10, 2008	BN201	5.39
Picking right up from the season 1 finale, Michael's wait for answers continues, with his new handler, Carla, forcing him to do one job first: help an IT guy named Jimmy (Guest Star: Patrick Fischler), whose family is in her hands, steal data on a hard drive he installed for a group of high-end mercenaries. When a slip-up reveals Jimmy's involvement with the eventual heist, Michael's team works to keep him alive for his family while also sending the authorities after the mercenaries. All Michael's efforts are for naught, as his meeting with Carla flies right under his nose, leaving him to decipher a coded crossword for details on their next meeting.
14	2	"Turn and Burn"	John T. Kretchmer	Alfredo Barrios, Jr.	July 17, 2008	BN202	4.87
Sam arranges for Michael to meet a waitress who is being stalked by a man they discover is an enforcer for a major narcotics trafficker, only to unearth her as an undercover DEA agent needing help in her waning investigation. Because he's still burned, Michael agrees to help "unofficially", working his way up the food chain to the organization's boss to get close enough to make him doubt his enforcer's loyalty, leaving the man no choice but to become a DEA source for protection. Meanwhile, in his first face-to-face meeting with Carla, Michael is assigned to find a counterfeiter (Guest Star: Erick Avari) who can duplicate an advanced keycard badge. With Carla still playing close to the vest, Michael continues looking for any hints to her identity and end game.
15	3	"Trust Me"	Paul Holahan	Craig O'Neill & Jason Tracey	July 24, 2008	BN203	4.76
Michael and his team assist a naive man who, looking to provide for his mother, borrowed money from a loan shark and then lost every cent in what was in reality a major con. With the loan shark coming after the guy hard, and the con man proving to be much more clever than expected, the team decides to run a con of their own, playing on his greed. While working to get the money back for their client, and convince the loan shark to leave him alone, Michael is pestered by his mother about his relationship with Fiona even as he continues his search for information on Carla. After blackmailing a Pakistani spy stationed at the local consulate, Michael is gifted the file on her work as an operative in Kurdistan.
16	4	"Comrades"	John T. Kretchmer	Matt Nix & Jason Ning	July 31, 2008	BN204	4.86
Nate returns to Miami and asks Michael to help his friend retrieve her sister, an immigrant from Russia caught in the human trafficking side of the local Russian mafia, who intend to kill her unless they are paid for bringing her over. Michael and his team kidnap the man who oversees the trafficking operation (Guest Star: Andrew Divoff), gradually convincing him the operation is in danger of being dismantled by the authorities so he'll lead them to the girls. At the same time, Michael finds information about Carla's cover, so Sam takes the lead in tracking her down in Miami. Despite the clever avoidance of their expert (Guest Star: Larry Miller), they're able to twist his arm for information that will lead to Carla's office for their own surveillance.
17	5	"Scatter Point"	Rod Hardy	Ben Watkins	August 7, 2008	BN205	4.56
Michael is approached by an ex-con looking to move on with his life and stay clean, but a heist mastermind (Guest Star: Oded Fehr) is pressuring the man to be involved in his upcoming plan to steal some jewels. After Michael finagles his way onto the team, Sam and Fiona assist him in sabotaging the heist and breaking up the thieves. Meanwhile, Michael makes his move on Carla's building, only to discover her security caught him sniffing around and emptied the building, leaving another crossword note with mock congratulations from her. In the middle of all this, Sam's girlfriend proposes to him, forcing him to confess to a serious past indiscretion and causing them to split up.
18	6	"Bad Blood"	Bronwen Hughes	Matt Nix & Rashad Raisani	August 14, 2008	BN206	3.88
A childhood friend comes to Michael for help when he discovers a coworker, who has been with the company from the beginning, is planning to frame him for stealing money from their boss, a major record mogul with gang history named Valentine (Guest Star: Method Man). To clear his friend's name and save his life, Michael concocts a scheme to push the thief to actions that the team can use to expose him to his boss and exonerate their client. Also, Michael meets Carla's psychotic compatriot Victor, whose job it is to keep Michael in line. Without explaining why, he orders Michael to help him steal a shipment from temporary storage, but, despite all the threats to him and his family, Michael does all he can to undercut Victor and discovers the item is a high-powered sniper rifle.
19	7	"Rough Seas"	Jeremiah S. Chechik	Alfredo Barrios, Jr. & Michael Horowitz	August 21, 2008	BN207	3.86
Virgil returns to ask Michael's help in retrieving millions of dollars' worth of medicine stolen from a medical missions clinic by mercenary pirates. As the team tracks down the thieves' storage place and reclaims the medicine, the newly-dating Fiona introduces Michael to the eccentric Seymour, a fellow black market arms expert who can get them information about the sniper rifle Victor stole. Though enthralled by Michael's skills, Seymour attacks him when his search for the rifle turns deadly, but he reveals that a man named "Bill Johnson" has picked up the gun.
20	8	"Double Booked"	Tim Matheson	Craig O'Neill & Jason Tracey	September 11, 2008	BN208	4.77
Michael's psychopathic former mentor, Larry, surprises him and presents a contract on behalf of a young man who wants to eliminate his step-mother so he can inherit his ailing father's wealth. To protect the woman, Michael takes the job and manages to save her, even as his attempts to convince the son to abandon his plot are constantly thwarted by Larry's murderous philosophy. Meanwhile, Michael goes to family therapy with his mother while working to find the sniper. As the team follows the gunman, pieces start coming together when he leads them to an office building, entering by using the forged keycard Michael got for Carla. This episode was nominated for "Best Episodic Drama" at the Writers Guild of America Awards 2008.
21	9	"Good Soldier"	Jeff Freilich	Alfredo Barrios, Jr.	September 18, 2008	BN209	4.67
Fiona's new paramedic boyfriend brings Michael to a man who is being forced to help assemble a team for some men with a complicated agenda looking to kidnap the daughter of a Venezuelan oil tycoon. Michael's scheme involves him becoming an inside man, as he seeks to thwart the kidnapping and put the bad guys in jail. On the sniper front, Michael discovers that the perch that has been selected has a perfect shot on the daily ferry, but his infiltration also yields the team the opportunity to tail Carla 24/7. With the assassination imminent, and Carla turning up the pressure on Michael to stay out of the way, the team goes into high gear to find out what's going on, but the sniper is murdered in a home explosion and Michael could be next... ("To Be Continued").
22	10	"Do No Harm"	Matt Nix	Matt Nix	January 22, 2009	BN210	5.12
Michael survives the attempt on his life, but Carla's men are still after him. While on the run, he and Sam encounter a suicidal man, who is trying to help his diseased son get urgent medical attention but has lost all his money to a medical scam artist. While tracking down the organization and its mastermind, Michael again enlists the help of Fiona's new boyfriend, causing a rift between them that ends their relationship, even as the team succeeds in getting the money back and putting the scammer in prison. In the meantime, Michael gives himself up to Carla, who tasks him with finding his would-be killer, and he resolves to keep her in the dark, intending to learn all he can about the unknown party for his own purposes.
23	11	"Hot Spot"	Stephen Surjik	Ben Watkins	January 29, 2009	BN211	5.38
After his star player (Guest Star: Michael B. Jordan) defends his sister from a gang of car thieves, a local football coach (Guest Star: Michael Irvin) comes to Sam for help when they come after the young man. Hoping to scare the gang out of Miami, the team pretends to be a flashy new rival, whose vicious tactics gain the notice of the organization's boss, so they use his influence to bring down the car thieves once and for all. Along the way, Michael and Fiona reminisce about old times while tracking down the man who bombed the loft, discovering that he's a demolitions expert who works for the city. Still withholding information from Carla, they find the man's house, which is booby-trapped to burn, and Fiona barely escapes before a distraught Michael finds her.
24	12	"Seek and Destroy"	Scott Peters	Rashad Raisani	February 5, 2009	BN212	5.27
Michael tracks a hacker for a wealthy art dealer, and then, after it turns out to be the receptionist, the truth comes out: the man killed her painter father just so he could sell one of his most valuable works. Playing on the man's paranoia, Michael is able to track down the painting and give closure to the woman. Meanwhile, Michael and Fiona return to Seymour for help finding the man who bombed Michael's loft, but, once they capture him, all the guy has is a bank account number in the Cayman Islands.
25	13	"Bad Breaks"	John T. Kretchmer	Michael Horowitz	February 12, 2009	BN213	4.84
Madeline asks Michael to help one of her friends, a female executive at a private bank who is being stalked by a man (Guest Star: Mark Sheppard) she met online. At the same time, Agent Bly returns to run his own angle on Michael in hopes of shaking off Michael's control of him through blackmail, but they become hostages when the stalker shows up at the bank to rob it. While they team up to free everyone and sabotage the robbers inside, Sam and Fiona help from the outside, and, after the good guys win, Michael and Bly come to an understanding. Bly also agrees to look into the bomber's bank account, but the investigation trips an alarm that empties the account, a sign that will have alerted whoever hired the bomber that Michael's coming.
26	14	"Truth & Reconciliation"	Ernest Dickerson	Alfredo Barrios, Jr.	February 19, 2009	BN214	4.67
A Haitian man comes to Michael, asking his help in his quest to seek justice for his daughter, who was imprisoned for speaking against the corruption of a former president and killed on his son's orders. With the man now in the US, and living under an assumed name, Michael approaches him as an old ally of the family in hopes that they can secure documents proving his true identity, only for his father to surface and call their bluff, leaving them no choice but to kidnap his son to be identified by surviving witnesses in Haiti. Meanwhile, after avoiding a murder attempt in his search for the person behind the bank account, Michael utilizes Fiona's trafficking connections and discovers the attempted assassin was smuggled into the country from the Caribbean, leading to a storage place the man used as a base, and the person who hired him is revealed there: Victor.
27	15	"Sins of Omission"	Dennie Gordon	Craig O'Neill & Jason Tracey	February 26, 2009	BN215	4.85
Michael's ex-fiance, another former spy who's a talented pick-pocket, shows up at his loft to plead for help with a predicament: her son, has been taken hostage by a black market trader named Tyler Brennen to coerce her into stealing valuable military technology, but she intends to return it. Brennen's espionage background proves to be a challenge for Michael as they work to get the chip back, and, when he tries to hand it to his buyers, the team decides to sabotage the handoff and convince Brennen his only choice is to let them return the chip, which they do before it's found missing. Along the way, Michael explains what happened with his former love to his family and friends, especially Fiona, who was curious why it didn't work. Simultaneously, Victor is after Michael, who confronts him and decides to kidnap him so they can work out their differences for the greater good.
28	16	"Lesser Evil"	Tim Matheson	Matt Nix	March 5, 2009	BN216	6.09
With Victor in their custody, and Carla coming after everyone in his life, Michael and the team make the most of Victor's information and usefulness to go after her so they can expose her devious actions. Things get dicey when she shoots Victor as he's about to leave the country with Michael, but Michael's own team arrives in time to eliminate Carla before she can clean up her mess. With his dying words, Victor gives Michael the critical file and tells him to get out while he can, so, with his team running from the authorities after their actions, Michael negotiates with Management over his freedom, choosing to accept the consequences when he's warned he won't have their protection any longer.
