= Burn Notice season 1 =

Burn Notice
- Season 1
- DVD cover
- No. of episodes: 12

Release
- Original network: USA Network
- Original release: June 28 – September 20, 2007

Season chronology
- Next → Season 2

The first season of the American television series Burn Notice originally aired from June 28, 2007, to September 20, 2007.

== Season overview ==
The first season of Burn Notice introduces Michael Westen. He is burned while on a covert operation in Nigeria. After fleeing, he soon finds himself in Miami, where he is reunited with his ex-girlfriend, Fiona Glenanne, and another old friend, Sam Axe. With his entire life in ruins and his former employers refusing to answer the phone to him, Michael begins the hunt for the man who signed the order to burn him, with his biggest source of trouble and information being the government agents assigned to monitor him. In addition to hunting for the people who burned him, Michael works as a freelance spy, helping people with cases involving kidnapping, arms dealers, con artists, and drug traffickers.

For several episodes, Michael is tailed by Harris (Marc Macaulay) and Lane (Brandon Morris), two FBI agents who are sent to keep tabs on Michael and to whom Sam reports due to them threatening his pension, mildly straining his relationship with Michael. Eventually after Sam "finds" a document in Michael's possession that he should not have, Harris and Lane are pulled from the case and replaced by a CSS agent, Jason Bly (Alex Carter). Bly makes Michael's life miserable, even going so far as having his loft raided and his car towed.

Michael returns the favor by making Bly's life miserable, such as breaking into his hotel room and concealing a magnet near his government laptop to destroy the memory core. Eventually, Michael reveals he has created falsified documents detailing that Bly and he are criminal partners (partially helped by Bly repeatedly entering his loft without legal permission or reason), and blackmails Bly into providing Michael with a copy of the dossier on Michael's Burn Notice: the document that details why he lost his job. Finally, Michael discovers the identity of the man who burned him: Phillip Cowan (Richard Schiff). Unable to leave Miami without alerting every agency, Michael gets Cowan's attention by having input on the FBI WatchList after arranging for the Head of the Libyan Secret Police to send Cowan a fruit basket.

He gets in touch with Cowan, and they eventually meet. Cowan laughs that Michael thinks that [Cowan] is solely responsible for destroying his career because of a name on a document, and cryptically reveals that he works for a much more powerful entity. However, Cowan is shot by a sniper after saying "This is much, much bigger than us, my friend." Michael is later contacted by a mysterious woman (later identified as Carla), who tells him that they should meet. Michael suspects that she is part of the organization that burned him, and he makes a long journey to meet her. The season ends with Michael driving onto a truck to be taken to his new "handler".

== Cast ==
=== Main ===
- Jeffrey Donovan as Michael Westen
- Gabrielle Anwar as Fiona Glenanne
- Bruce Campbell as Sam Axe
- Sharon Gless as Madeline Westen

=== Recurring ===
- Seth Peterson as Nate Westen
- Paul Tei as Barry Burkowski
- Marc Macaulay as Agent Harris
- Brandon Morris as Agent Lane
- Audrey Landers as Veronica
- Alex Carter as Jason Bly
- Richard Schiff as Phillip Cowan
- China Chow as Lucy Chen
- Chris Ellis as Virgil Watkins

== Characters ==
Jeffrey Donovan was cast as burned spy Michael Westen. Gabrielle Anwar was given the role of ex-IRA operative Fiona Glenanne. The character of Sam Axe, an ex-Navy SEAL, was given to long-time action star Bruce Campbell, while Sharon Gless was given the part of Michael's hypochondriac mother, Madeline Westen.

Various recurring characters made appearances throughout the season. Paul Tei portrayed Barry Burkowski, a money-launderer. Seth Peterson was cast as Michael's brother, Nate Westen. Two FBI agents in charge of Michael's case at the beginning of the season, Agents Harris and Lane, were played by Marc Macaulay and Brandon Morris, respectively. Audrey Landers made various appearances as Sam's "lady-friend", Veronica. Alex Carter portrayed the difficult Agent Jason Bly. Phillip Cowan, the man who wrote Michael's burn notice, was portrayed by Richard Schiff. A former associate of Michael's, Lucy Chen, was played by China Chow. Characters that would return in later episodes, the drug-dealing Sugar, client Virgil Watkins, and heroin dealer Carmelo, were played by Arturo Fernandez, Chris Ellis, and Todd Stashwick, respectively. Other prominent guests included Steven Bauer, Arye Gross, Lucy Lawless, Esai Morales, Mark Pellegrino, Dedee Pfeiffer, and Ray Wise.

== Episodes ==
No. overall	No. in season	Title	Directed by	Written by	Original release date	Prod. code	US viewers (millions)
1	1	"Pilot"^{Note 1}	Jace Alexander	Matt Nix	June 28, 2007	BN179	3.99
Michael Westen, a covert-operations agent working for the U.S. Government, is on an assignment in Nigeria when he suddenly and unexpectedly gets "burned". After barely escaping with his life on the first flight he can get out of the country, he wakes up in his hometown of Miami, Florida, under government surveillance. There, he also reconnects with significant people from his past: his gun-happy ex-girlfriend Fiona; his beer-loving, womanizing best friend, ex-Navy SEAL Sam Axe; even his very lonely, chain-smoking mother Madeline. In order to make ends meet and track down leads on who burned him and why, Michael uses his skills helping people in significant trouble, beginning with an estate caretaker (David Zayas) who has been framed by his boss (Ray Wise) for a high-priced art theft. Finally, Michael hears back from his old handler why he was burned and that he can't leave Miami without putting his life in danger, a reality proven when he returns home to find pictures of himself scattered about with a message: "Welcome to Miami," the show's tagline. The teleplay by Matt Nix won a 2008 Edgar Allan Poe Award, honoring the best in mystery, in the category Best Television Episode Teleplay.
2	2	"Identity"	Rod Hardy	Matt Nix	July 5, 2007	BN101	3.94
Michael's mother asks him to help one of her friends, a retiree who was scammed out of her life savings by a group of con artists led by a man named Quentin (Mark Pellegrino). After working his way into the con artist group and causing dissension among the ranks, Michael is able to convince Quentin to give him the information to access the stolen accounts, allowing him to return all of the money. Afterward, with the government watching even his family and friends, Michael calls them only to receive instructions to continue in his new job.
3	3	"Fight or Flight"^{Note 2}	Colin Bucksey	Craig O'Neill & Jason Tracey	July 12, 2007	BN103	3.25
Michael's landlord asks him to help his top waitress, who is being harassed by a drug cartel because she is a witness to a brutal beating committed by their top drug-runner. In order to get the cartel off her back, Michael manages to convince them that their man is working with the feds as a cooperating witness. Meanwhile, he calls in a favor with an Egyptian spy he once rescued and asks for the file on his burn notice.
4	4	"Old Friends"^{Note 2}	David Solomon	Alfredo Barrios, Jr.	July 19, 2007	BN102	3.33
Michael's brother Nate comes to him with a request to help a family friend track down and rescue his estranged daughter, who has been caught up in a prostitution ring disguised as a modeling agency. To do so, he kidnaps one of two brothers that run the operation and trades him for the safe return of the girl, who finally learns the truth about the ring and tearfully reunites with her father. Meanwhile, Michael barely avoids assassination by an old enemy of his, a Czech assassin who has learned of Michael's burning. While trying to get the FBI out of Sam's hair, Michael decides to get as much out of the assassin as he can about the burn notice, then turns him over to them only to learn that agents with high-level clearance took him away and then killed him.
5	5	"Family Business"	Sanford Bookstaver	Matt Nix	July 26, 2007	BN104	3.51
Michael helps an airport security guard whose family is being threatened by a family of arms dealers with connections to the Mossad, posing as an arms trafficker so he can learn the secret location of their storage house to gain leverage and force them to leave Miami. Meanwhile, while Michael and his brother try to find who inherits their dad's classic Charger, he also learns that the FBI is still harassing Sam.
6	6	"Unpaid Debts"	Paul Holahan	Nick Thiel	August 2, 2007	BN105	4.41
Sam asks Michael to help a SEAL teammate of his named Virgil, a repo man who is having trouble reclaiming a boat for his own clients from Jamaican gangsters. Complicating matters is that the clients are dirty cops, and the boat has $10 million hidden on board, so, with the money in Michael's hands, the Jamaicans kidnap Virgil for leverage. At the exchange, things go south, as Michael and his team barely escape with Virgil while the cops and Jamaicans are in a deadly shootout. At the same time, amidst his breakup with Fiona, Michael meets Jason Bly, a government agent who has been sent to keep an eye on him and stop him from looking into his burn notice.
7	7	"Broken Rules"	Tim Matheson	Mere Smith	August 9, 2007	BN106	4.14
A merchant (Esai Morales) based in Little Havana hires Michael for $20,000 to purge a criminal gang that terrorizes local businesses. Posing as a crazed (loco) terrorist competing for their territory, Michael gains the attention of the gang's leader Concha and destroys the organization from the inside. Simultaneously, he works with his money launderer friend Barry to blackmail agent Bly for a copy of his classified burn notice. Michael and Fi have a violent physical fight to resolve their relationship issues.
8	8	"Wanted Man"	Ken Girotti	Craig O'Neill & Jason Tracey	August 16, 2007	BN107	4.23
In her side job as a bail bonds-woman, Fiona enlists Michael's help in tracking down a man who jumped bail, then they take his side when they discover he's been framed for the theft of a valuable jewel. While they work to track down the real thief and flush the jewel into the open so he can be arrested, Michael continues his hunt for clues and finds out who burned him.
9	9	"Hard Bargain"	John T. Kretchmer	Alfredo Barrios, Jr.	August 23, 2007	BN108	4.08
A young man who house sits for several wealthy people asks Michael to help rescue his fiancée, who has been kidnapped for a million dollar ransom because her captors think he's rich. Despite the guy being a nervous wreck, Michael and his team manage to capture one of her kidnappers and turn him into their own asset, allowing them to track down the woman's location and bring the kidnapper (Steven Bauer) to justice. Meanwhile, Michael barely escapes being assassinated by a man (Arye Gross) pretending to be a government bureaucrat sent to review his burn notice.
10	10	"False Flag"	Paul Shapiro	Matt Nix & Ben Watkins	September 13, 2007	BN109	4.02
Needing a fake ID to go to Washington, D.C. to find the man who burned him, Michael takes the case of a woman (Lucy Lawless) who claims her son has been kidnapped by her estranged husband. In spite of his better judgment, and Fiona's instincts, Michael becomes emotionally involved in the case, only to discover that the woman is really an assassin sent to kill the man. While Sam and Fiona take the man to safety, Michael finds the assassin nearby and captures her, but she decides to jump to her death rather than go to jail. In the end, all Michael's work is in vain, as Sam tells him that the man who burned him is coming to Miami.
11	11	"Dead Drop"^{Note 3}	Jeremiah S. Chechik	Craig O'Neill & Jason Tracey	September 20, 2007	BN110	4.78
Season Finale, Part I: Michael and his crew help a woman who is being blackmailed by heroin importers, even as Michael plays cat and mouse trying to set up a meeting with the man who burned him, only to have the man (Richard Schiff) assassinated by an unknown sniper before giving Michael any useful intel. Things go really bad, though, when the smugglers kidnap Sam and force Fiona to go on the run.
12	12	"Loose Ends"^{Note 3}	Stephen Surjik	Matt Nix & Alfredo Barrios, Jr.	September 20, 2007	BN111	4.78
Season Finale, Part II: With Sam being held hostage by heroin smugglers with Special Forces training, Michael must use his underworld connections to rescue him while trying to avoid mysterious new agents hot on his tail, led by a woman (Tricia Helfer) who keeps threatening him. After bargaining for more time, Michael eventually rescues Sam and destroys the smuggling operation, then turns right around to drive to the middle of nowhere, hoping to get answers about his burn notice from this unknown group.

Notes

1. The pilot was originally produced to be shown as a two-hour movie or as two one-hour episodes. When USA decided to broadcast it uninterrupted, it was edited to fit a 90 minute time slot; this version is also on the Season 1 DVD. The two-part version was eventually shown in Australia, and is now on PlutoTV More Drama channel.
2. "Fight or Flight" was originally intended for broadcast after episode "Old Friends", however these episodes were slightly re-edited and shown in reverse order.
3. "Dead Drop" and "Loose Ends" were shown as one continuous two-hour finale, but originally produced to be aired as two separate episodes. "Dead Drop" is sometimes referred to as "Loose Ends", Part I.
4. Season One was originally broadcast in 1.33:1 (full screen) format. Beginning with the June 5, 2008 rebroadcast of "Wanted Man", the show began airing in 1.78:1 (widescreen) format.
