= Assaf Cohen =

American actor (born 1972)

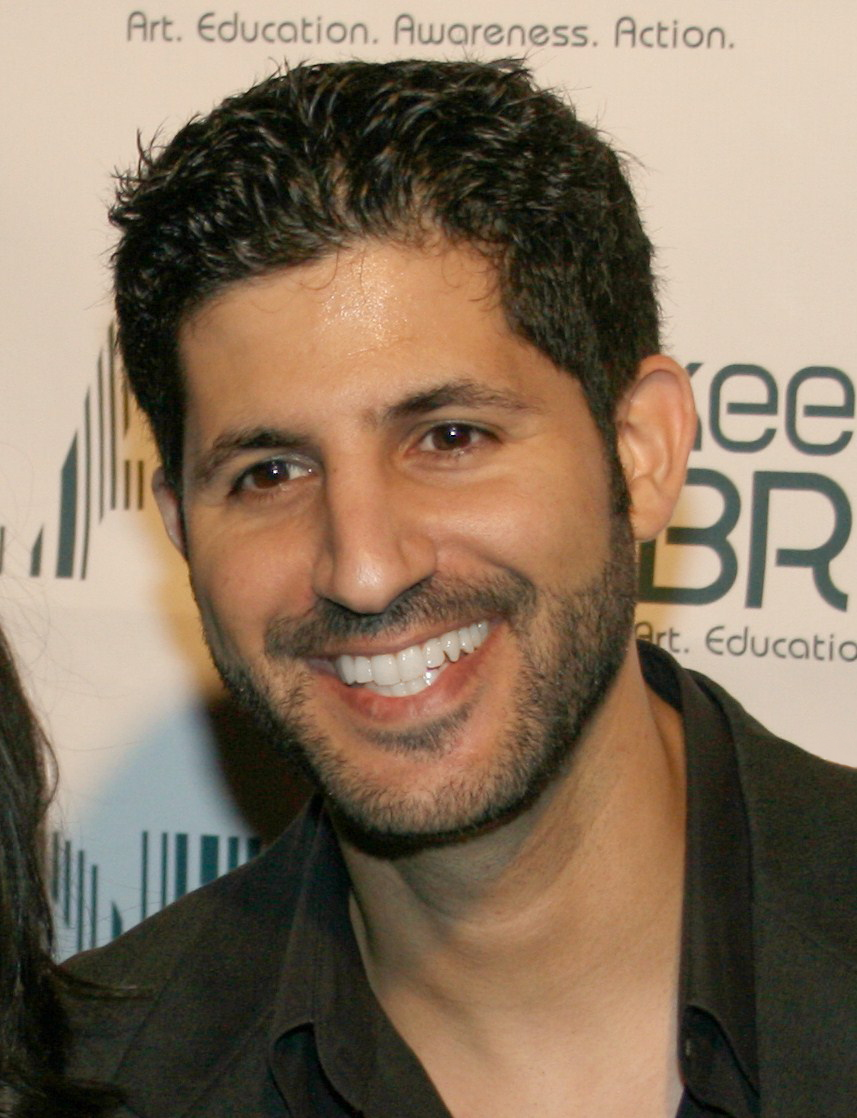
- Born: October 31, 1972 (age 53); Mountain View, California, U.S.
- Years active: 2002–present

Assaf Cohen (born October 31, 1972) is an American actor. Born in Mountain View, California and raised in Palo Alto, California, Cohen is of Yemenite, Russian, and Israeli descent. He graduated from the University of California, Berkeley with a BA degree in Integrative Biology. Initially planning to attend medical school, Cohen decided to pursue a career in acting instead.

Cohen's early career included work at various regional theaters in California, such as The Magic, Marin Shakespeare Company, Marin Theatre Company, TheatreWorks, San Francisco Shakespeare Festival, and PCPA Theaterfest. He then moved to the East Coast to earn an MFA in acting from the Professional Actors Training Program at Rutgers University's Mason Gross School of the Arts. Later, Cohen relocated to Los Angeles, where he performed at South Coast Repertory and began a career in film and television.

== Early life ==
Cohen was born in Mountain View, California and raised in Palo Alto, California, where his family settled after living for a number of years in Israel. He is of Yemenite, Russian and Israeli descent. Cohen graduated from the University of California, Berkeley with a BA degree in Integrative Biology. Forgoing earlier plans of attending medical school, he instead pursued professional acting.

== Career ==
Cohen worked for a few years at regional theaters such as The Magic, Marin Shakespeare Company, Marin Theatre Company, TheatreWorks, San Francisco Shakespeare Festival, and PCPA Theaterfest. He then next moved east and earned an MFA degree in acting from the Professional Actors Training Program at Rutgers University's Mason Gross School of the Arts, where he studied under New York Acting teachers William Esper, Maggie Flanigan and Deborah Hedwall. He later moved to Los Angeles, where he performed at theaters including South Coast Repertory and began his career in film and television.

== Filmography ==
=== Film ===
Year	Title	Role	Notes
2002	American Gulag		Short film
2004	A Moment of Grace	Arab radio announcer	Short film
2005	Flightplan	Ahmed	
2005	West Bank Story	Menorah Mickey	Academy Award winner, Best Live Action Short Film
2007	Equal Opportunity	Al'Ahhhhkkkkhh bin Laden	
2009	Fast & Furious	Border Agent #1	
2011	Convincing Clooney	Jason	
2013	Peace After Marriage	Boris	
2014	At the Devil's Door	Dr. Aranda	
2014	American Sniper	Terp #2	
2023	Elemental	Additional voices	

=== Television ===
Year	Title	Role	Episode No. & Title
2002	The Agency	Young Man in taxi	2.02 - "Air Lex"
2003	JAG	Musa Sabet	9.05 - "Touchdown"
2003	Half & Half	Matt	2.10 - "The Big Bitter Shower Episode"
2004	Half & Half	Matt	2.15 - "The Big I Haven't the Vegas Idea Episode"
2005	Over There	Black Hood Interrogator (uncredited)	1.02 - "Roadblock Duty"
2005	24	Yassir	4.21 - "Day 4: 3:00 a.m. – 4:00 a.m."
2005	Monk	Ricardo	4.05 - "Mr. Monk Gets Drunk"
2006	Sleeper Cell	Lt. Hayat	2.02 - "Salesman"
2006	Numb3rs	Agent Kareem Allawi	2.18 - "All's Fair"
2007	Entourage	Yair Marx	3.19 - "The Prince's Bride"
2007	Entourage	Yair Marx	4.12 - "The Cannes Kids"
2007	NCIS	'Goliath' Eli Lissack	4.14 - "Blowback"
2008	Burn Notice	Waseem Ali Khan	2.03 - "Trust Me"
2008	Reno 911!	Iraqi Lieutenant	5.10 - "Baghdad 911"
2008	Ghost Whisperer	Andy Yates	3.14 - "The Grave Sitter"
2008	Knight Rider (2008 film)	Amir	TV movie
2008	The Ex List	Shaman	1.06 - "Daphne's Idealized Wedding"
2009	Heroes	Hesam	Five episodes, Seasons 3-4
2009	NCIS: Los Angeles	Tariq Barad Al-jabiri	
2009	Operating Instructions	Eli Bamberger	Pilot
2010	CSI: Miami	Ahmed Salib	Dishonor
2010	24	Navid	8.16 - "Day 8: 7:00 a.m. – 8:00 a.m."]
2010	Weeds	Hooman Jaka	Three episodes, Season 6
2011	Funny or Die Presents...	Radio Man	2.07 - Segment: "Terrorist on Flight 77"
2011	Criminal Minds: Suspect Behavior	Martin Malek	1.13 - "Death by a Thousand Cuts"
2012	Last Resort	Linus Terman	1.2 - "Blue on Blue"
2013	Supernatural	Ajay	8.19 - "Taxi Driver"
2013	Agents of S.H.I.E.L.D.	Qasim's Translator	1.3 "The Asset"
2014	Bones	Mauricio	9.15--'Heiress in the Hill'
2014	Glee	Kurt's Doctor	5.15 - "Bash"
2015	Castle	Dr. Rusham Haroun	7.16 The Wrong Stuff
2017	Dark	Noah	English dub
2019	Money Heist	Andres de Fonollosa (Berlin)	English dub
2020	9-1-1	Ellis	3.14 - "The Taking of Dispatch 9-1-1"
2021	Magnum P.I.	Professor Roland Bar	3.07 - "Killer on the Midnight Watch"
2023	The Rookie	Deon Laetner	5.14 - "Death Sentence"
