= The Memoirs of Cleopatra =

1997 novel by Margaret George

- First edition
- Author: Margaret George
- Audio read by: Donata Peters
- Language: English
- Genre: Historical fiction
- Publisher: St. Martin's Press
- Publication date: April 15, 1997
- Publication place: United States
- Media type: Print
- Pages: 964
- ISBN: 0312154305
- OCLC: 36121002

The Memoirs of Cleopatra is a 1997 historical fiction novel written by American author Margaret George, detailing the purported life of Cleopatra VII, Queen of Egypt. Published on April 15, 1997, it landed on The New York Times Best Seller list for Fiction Hardcover. In 1999, the American network ABC adapted it for television, and released it as a four-part mini series entitled Cleopatra starring the French-Chilean actress Leonor Varela alongside Timothy Dalton and Billy Zane.

== Plot summary ==
The story follows Cleopatra VII, from her early life under the rule of her father Ptolemy XII Auletes, to her eventual suicide. When Cleopatra is a young girl, Ptolemy is overthrown by his two elder daughters, Cleopatra VI and Berenice, and requires the help of Rome to save his throne, increasing his country's debt. Cleopatra VII is named co-ruler with her father, and when he dies, her young brother Ptolemy XIII is named in his stead. In accordance with tradition, she marries him. Later, Ptolemy overthrows his sister under the advice of his advisers. Cleopatra seeks out the nearby Julius Caesar. She hides in a rug and has herself secretly presented to him, beginning a tryst. She falls in love with him.

With his help, at the age of seventeen, she becomes queen of Egypt, but feels betrayed when her brother is ordered back as her co-regent. Cleopatra and Caesar tour the country, and she becomes pregnant. They marry and he returns home, while she gives birth of a son named Ptolemy Caesar. Caesar acknowledges the boy, but is assassinated soon after. Cleopatra meets Marcus Antonius, and the two begin an affair that will last years. Together, they fight to withstand the aggression of Caesar's successor, Octavian.

== Development and release ==
Author Margaret George read about Cleopatra as a young girl, and had always had an interest in the classics. George related to the historical figure because they were both dark-haired, in an era when most images of beauty seemed to be blonde. She spent two and a half years writing The Memoirs of Cleopatra, traveling to Egypt four times to research it. Referring to the many incorrect presentations of the legendary queen, George considers her novel to be "the most historically accurate version within the limits of the medium". She viewed Cleopatra fundamentally as a "political leader" who suffered from centuries of Roman propaganda and Shakespearean plays, each of whom sought to depict her as "flighty". George said that "she was obviously very appealing but not this bimbo that the Romans would like you to think she was".

The finished novel was 964 pages; George describes this as "big, but it's not padded". By 1997, George was a successful author who had published popular historical novels about Henry VIII and Mary, Queen of Scots. Assuming her latest novel would also be popular, St. Martin's Press ordered 200,000 copies. The Memoirs of Cleopatra was published by St. Martin's Press in March 1997. George launched a national book tour in April, and it landed on The New York Times Best Seller list for fiction hardcover in May and June. By May 1999, it had sold 180,000 copies.

== Reception ==
Megan Harlan of Entertainment Weekly graded the novel with an A− and called it an "absorbing, meticulous cast-of-thousands epic". Harlan added that while "long swaths of Roman civil warfare might prove skimmable for some... the rest of The Memoirs of Cleopatra is completely absorbing, as if ancient frescoes had sprung alive". Publishers Weekly also gave a positive review, lauding her "palpably real" settings and ability to depict the era's many battles with "skill and passion". They added that "in nearly a thousand pages, [George] creates countless memorable moments... Readers looking to be transported to another place and time will find their magic carpet here". Kirkus Reviews compared The Memoirs of Cleopatra to her novel on Mary, Queen of Scots, writing that "unlike George's Mary, based on that sovereign's letters and diaries, Cleopatra's voice is lost in the sands of time, and its echo here is curiously bland". The reviewer added: "As for the power boys – Caesar and Antony – both lack the steely tang of Colleen McCullough's portraits".

== Miniseries adaptation ==
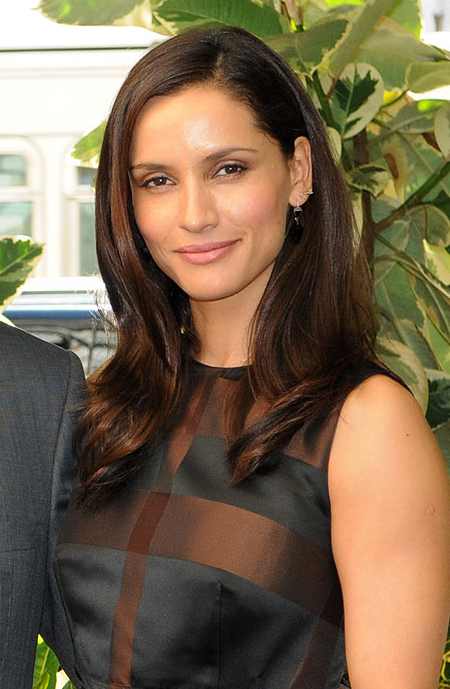
French-Chilean actress Leonor Varela starred as Cleopatra in the television adaptation of George's novel.

The American network ABC optioned the novel even before its completion. A four-hour television miniseries adaptation of The Memoirs of Cleopatra was broadcast in 1999, entitled Cleopatra. One of the most expensive television productions ever, it was adapted by Anton Diether and Stephen Harrigan, whom George became friends with. She served as a minor consultant for the miniseries. Filmed in North Africa and London, it starred the "purposely unknown" French-Chilean actress Leonor Varela as the titular character, along with costars Timothy Dalton and Billy Zane as her respective lovers Caesar and Antony. The adaptation, which received mixed to negative reviews, deviated from the novel in several significant ways, including its condensing of Cleopatra's relationship with Antony. George has stated that "they 'telescoped' it in the interest of time. They kept the psychology, and they kept the motivation. But they rearranged some things". She also added that she thinks:

"they did well considering that they had to condense things so much. My book has everything in it – her childhood, her children, her battle strategies. It's encyclopedic. But I think they have the spirit of it. They've preserved the essential psychology of it".
