= Cleopatra (miniseries) =

1999 miniseries adaptation of the novel The Memoirs of Cleopatra

- Based on: The Memoirs of Cleopatra by Margaret George
- Teleplay by: Stephen Harrigan; Anton Diether
- Directed by: Franc Roddam
- Starring: Leonor Varela
- Music by: Trevor Jones
- Countries of origin: United States; Germany
- Original language: English
- No. of episodes: 2

Production
- Executive producers: Robert Halmi Sr.; Robert A. Halmi
- Producers: Robert Halmi Jr.; Robert Halmi Sr.; Steve Harding; Dyson Lovell; Steven North
- Cinematography: David Connell
- Running time: 177 minutes per episode
- Production company: Hallmark Entertainment

Original release
- Network: ABC
- Release: May 23 – May 24, 1999

Cleopatra is a 1999 American-German two-part miniseries adaptation of Margaret George's 1997 historical fiction novel The Memoirs of Cleopatra. Produced by Hallmark Entertainment, it stars Leonor Varela as the Egyptian queen Cleopatra, Timothy Dalton as Julius Caesar, Billy Zane as Mark Antony, Rupert Graves as Octavius, Sean Pertwee as Brutus and Bruce Payne as Cassius. Cleopatra was first broadcast on ABC television network in two parts on two consecutive evenings in May 1999 and then released on videotape and DVD in 2001. Judy Farr, Martin Hitchcock and Frank Walsh were nominated for an Emmy in 1999 for outstanding art direction for a miniseries or a movie for their work on Cleopatra.

== Plot ==
In 47 BC, Egypt is in civil war. Cleopatra VII, Egypt's rightful Queen, is in exile, while her sister Arsinoe and brother Ptolemy have stolen the throne. Roman general Julius Caesar comes to Alexandria to collect Egypt's tax debt. Cleopatra smuggles herself into the palace wrapped in a carpet, a gift from her to Caesar. The two spend the night together, and the next morning, Cleopatra and Ptolemy are betrothed to marry by Caesar. Cleopatra is proclaimed Queen of Egypt. Caesar then orders the death of the unscrupulous Prime Minister Pothinus, prompting Ptolemy and Arsinoe to flee and return with their army to drive their sister out of Alexandria.

A battle breaks out between the Romans and the Egyptian forces, and in the process, Alexandria's great library is burned to the ground. Arsinoe and Ptolemy are pursued by Roman forces. Arsinoe is captured while Ptolemy is killed when his carriage overturns. Cleopatra has Arsinoe strangled in her cell. Cleopatra and Caesar take a 2-month journey down the Nile aboard one of the Queen's elegant ships. Caesar comes under fire from the Roman Senate and his critic Brutus due to a crisis in Pontus. Caesar promptly leaves for Rome. Unbeknownst to Caesar, Cleopatra is pregnant with his child. A son is born to the queen roughly nine months later; he is named Caesarion, in honor of his father.

Back in Rome, Caesar invites Cleopatra to stay at one of his villas, just outside Rome. With her, she brings the couple's infant son. In front of his people (including wife Calpurnia), Cleopatra declares that Caesar is her son's father, publicly forcing his hand, and demanding that her son be allowed to rule both Egypt and Rome invoking the consternation of Brutus and Cassius. Believing that he should hold the same status as his Egyptian lover, Caesar demands he be declared King of Rome. Although they are hesitant to do so, the senate eventually grants Caesar's request. Now having been declared king, Caesar prepares for his conquest of Parthia. Although he accepts Caesarion as his child, Caesar denies the queen's request, causing Cleopatra to leave him.

Just before her return to Egypt, Cleopatra soon learns that Caesar has been assassinated at the hands of Brutus, Cassius and other senators. The burdens of ruling fall on the shoulders of Caesar's Roman heir and nephew, Octavian and Mark Antony who declares revenge and begins a war against Brutus and Cassius. In the process, both Cassius and Brutus commit suicide, but Octavian desecrates Brutus' corpse, creating a rift between him and Mark Antony.

In spending time together, Antony and Cleopatra fall in love. Antony turns away from her for the sake of Rome. Antony reluctantly marries Octavian's sister, Octavia, in order to strengthen his alliance and co-ruling with the new emperor but returns to Egypt. Defying his Roman beliefs against polygamy, Antony marries Cleopatra in Antioch, claiming that her son, Caesarion, is heir to not only Egypt, but also Rome.

Upon hearing of Antony's claim, Octavian wages war against the two lovers. Antony leads Cleopatra's fleet into the legendary Battle of Actium. Octavian defeats Antony, which demoralizes he and his men. Cleopatra sends her son to India while Antony prepares a last stand. His army is overwhelmed by Octavian's army. Antony returns with his defeated soldiers, badly wounded and soon dies of his injuries. Cleopatra is devastated.

Octavian arrives in Alexandria, demanding that Cleopatra join him in Rome as his prisoner. She agrees and asks that her son be allowed to rule Egypt. Octavian refuses, but allows Antony to have an Egyptian burial. Cleopatra lets an Egyptian asp bite her, and dies shortly after. Her handmaidens quickly follow their queen's example.

Octavian's men break through the doors, only to discover that the queen is dead. Octavian approaches Cleopatra and finds that she is dead. He says, "You have won, Cleopatra" and then leaves.

== Cast ==
- Leonor Varela as Queen Cleopatra
- Timothy Dalton as Julius Caesar
- Billy Zane as Marc Antony
- Rupert Graves as Octavius
- Sean Pertwee as Brutus
- Bruce Payne as Cassius
- David Schofield as Casca
- John Bowe as Rufio
- Art Malik as Olympos
- Nadim Sawalha as Mardian
- Owen Teale as Grattius
- Philip Quast as Cornelius
- Daragh O'Malley as Ahenobarbus
- Omid Djalili as Store Master
- Richard Armitage as Epiphanes
- Denis Quilley as Senator
- Kassandra Voyagis as Arsinoe
- Sean Cronin as High Priest
- Indra Ové as Charmian
- Oded Fehr as Egyptian Captain

== Music ==
The 55-minute soundtrack is composed by Trevor Jones and performed by the London Symphony Orchestra.

== See also ==
- Cleopatra, starring Elizabeth Taylor as Queen Cleopatra VII
- List of historical drama films
- List of films set in ancient Rome
