= Last of the Dogmen =

1995 American Western film

- Theatrical release poster
- Directed by: Tab Murphy
- Written by: Tab Murphy
- Produced by: Joel B. Michaels; Mario Kassar
- Starring: Tom Berenger; Barbara Hershey; Kurtwood Smith; Steve Reevis
- Cinematography: Karl Walter Lindenlaub
- Edited by: Richard Halsey
- Music by: David Arnold
- Production company: Carolco Pictures
- Distributed by: Savoy Pictures (United States); Guild Film Distribution (International; through Kathy Morgan Entertainment)
- Release date: September 8, 1995 (USA)
- Running time: 118 minutes
- Country: United States
- Language: English
- Budget: $25 million
- Box office: $7,024,389

Last of the Dogmen is a 1995 American Western film written and directed by Tab Murphy (in his feature directorial debut). It stars Tom Berenger, Barbara Hershey, Kurtwood Smith and Steve Reevis. Set in the mountains of northwest Montana, United States, the film is about a bounty hunter who tracks escaped convicts into a remote region and encounters an unknown band of Dog Soldiers from a tribe of Cheyenne Indians. The film was shot on location in Alberta and British Columbia, Canada, as well as in Mexico. Critical reviews were mixed to positive, though the film was a box office disappointment.

== Plot ==
Distraught but skillful bounty hunter Lewis Gates is accompanied by his horse and faithful companion Zip, an Australian Cattle Dog. Gates tracks three armed escaped convicts into Montana's isolated Oxbow Quadrangle, at the persistence of his unforgiving ex-father-in-law, who blames Gates for his daughter's tragic death. Gates sees the convicts but hears gunshots. Investigating the scene, Gates finds only a bloody scrap of cloth, "enough blood to paint the sheriff's office," a bloody shotgun shell, and an old-fashioned Indian arrow.

Gates takes the arrow to archaeologist Lillian Sloan, who identifies it as a replica of the arrows used by Cheyenne Dog Soldiers. Gates doesn't think it's a replica and, after some library research, develops a long list of people who have disappeared into the Oxbow. He also finds a story of a "wild child" captured by railroad men in the woods in the early 20th century and who escaped and disappeared. Now, he's convinced that the three fugitives were killed by Cheyenne people who escaped the 1864 Sand Creek massacre, avoided being forced onto the Northern Cheyenne Indian Reservation, and who have survived for 128 years in the northwestern Montana Wilderness by killing any White people who threatened to find and expose their existence.

Gates convinces Sloan to join him in a search for the missing Cheyenne. The two enter the Oxbow and begin to search. They survive many mishaps and bond throughout their journey, eventually venturing deeper into the wilderness than Gates has ever gone before, around 50 miles (80.5 km) in.

After a week and nearing the end of their supplies, Sloan suggests heading back. As the two are packing their gear, they are suddenly attacked by a Cheyenne war party. Sloan, speaking the Cheyenne language, de-escalates the situation, and the two are taken captive by Yellow Wolf. They are taken to a Cheyenne village in a valley accessed through a tunnel behind a waterfall. The duo meet the village Chief Spotted Elk, who tells them of the escape and salvation of the Cheyenne 128 years ago, as well as his own run-in with the "white people" and escape from "the house of iron bars" when he was still a child.

Gates and Sloan slowly become friendly with the Cheyenne. However, Yellow Wolf's son is sick, after being wounded in the gunfight with the convicts. Despite the elder's concerns, Sloan convinces Yellow Wolf to allow Gates to ride into town to obtain antibiotics. In town, Gates robs the pharmacy and is chased by local law enforcement, including Sheriff Deegan, his father-in-law.

After escaping, Gates meets Yellow Wolf in the wilderness, and they return to the Cheyenne camp. By this time, the sheriff has gathered a posse and sets out to hunt down Gates both for robbing the store and to find Gates' female companion, whom the sheriff believes Gates has hiding in the Oxbow.

Gates and Sloan continue to grow closer to the Cheyenne, and Sloan discloses that they are indeed the last of their kind. However, Yellow Wolf shows Gates that the sheriff is following his trail and is slowly getting closer to the encampment. Knowing that if discovered, the Cheyenne will fight and die, Gates proposes a solution; using some leftover TNT the Cheyenne had taken from explorers many years earlier, he will create a distraction and allow the Cheyenne to flee deeper inside the Oxbow and live in peace, far away from civilization. Sloan decides to stay with the Cheyenne, which Gates reluctantly agrees to.

The two share a passionate kiss, and Gates begins to set up his plan. Gates gives himself up to the sheriff and pleads with him to leave the wilderness. However, the sheriff discovers the hidden tunnel and prepares to enter it. Escaping, Gates attempts to light the TNT with a rifle, but the sheriff stops him and threatens him with a gun to his head. Yellow Wolf appears, surprising the sheriff, and fires an arrow at the TNT, setting it off.

Gates and the sheriff are propelled out of the tunnel into the waterfall. Gates saves the sheriff, who is badly wounded. The deputy tells everyone to clear out, and they all head back to town to treat the wounded sheriff and Gates.

In Gates' holding cell, the sheriff confronts him about what Gates saw. Gates relents and says some things don't need an explanation; they deserve to remain undiscovered. This seemingly helps smooth over Gates' and the sheriff's relationship.

Sloan and the Cheyenne are shown to have successfully escaped. An indeterminate time later, Gates has begun searching for them in heavy snow. Using hints provided by Sloan, he is able to find them. The film ends with Zip running toward Gates as he enters a clearing and a passionate embrace between Sloan and Gates.

== Cast ==
- Tom Berenger as Lewis Gates
- Barbara Hershey as Professor Lillian Diane "L.D." Sloan
- Kurtwood Smith as Sheriff Deegan
- Steve Reevis as Yellow Wolf
- Andrew Miller as Briggs
- Gregory Scott Cummins as Sears
- Mark Boone Junior as Tattoo
- Helen Calahasen as Yellow Wolf's Wife
- Eugene Blackbear as Spotted Elk
- Dawn Lavand as Indian Girl
- Sidel Standing Elk as Lean Bear
- Hunter Bodine as Kid
- Graham Jarvis as Pharmacist
- Marvin R. Thunderbull as Wolfscout
- Parley Baer as Mr. Hollis
- Molly Parker as Nurse
- Antony Holland as Doc Carvey
- Robert Donley as Old Timer
- Brian Stollery as Grad Student
- Mitchell LaPlante as Wild Boy
- Wilford Brimley as The Narrator
- Zip as Zip

== Production ==
Last of the Dogmen was Tab Murphy's directorial debut; he wrote the screenplay in the early-1980s and producer Joel B. Michaels bought the film rights. The film was budgeted at $25 million and was expected to have an 11-week shooting schedule.

Filming locations included:

- Banff National Park, Alberta, Canada
- Canmore, Alberta, Canada
- Kananaskis Country, Alberta, Canada
- Yoho National Park, British Columbia, Canada
  - Takakkaw Falls
- Cuernavaca, Morelos, Mexico

== Reception ==
Last of the Dogmen holds a 69% "Fresh" rating on Rotten Tomatoes. Roger Ebert of The Chicago Sun-Times gave the movie 3 out of 4 stars, describing it as "an absorbing story, well told" and carried by Berenger's unpretentious performance, but he felt the final act descended into clichés and failed to live up to the intriguing premise.

== Alternate releases ==
The American theatrical and home video releases of this film included third-person narration by Wilford Brimley, which is absent from the UK version. The DVD allows the viewer to choose. A limited version available to watch on Netflix until October 19, 2020, featured another alternate narrated by Kurtwood Smith.
