= Deborah Offner =

American actress

- Occupations: Actress; songwriter; playwright; theatre director

Deborah Offner is an American actress, songwriter, playwright, and theatre director.

== Life ==
Offner appeared in several Jonathan Kaplan films and TV series, including Project X, Immediate Family, Unlawful Entry, Love Field, ER and Law & Order: Special Victims Unit.

In 1981 the United States Department of Justice awarded payments of $10,000 each to Offner and four other people for violation of their constitutional rights by the Federal Bureau of Investigation. Leon Friedman, a lawyer for the New York Civil Liberties Union, said that federal agents opened Offner's mail four times.

== Partial filmography ==
- Mourning Becomes Electra (1974, TV Mini-Series) - Hazel
- A Small Circle of Friends (1980) - Sarah
- Ghost Story (1981) - Helen
- Soup for One (1982) - Girl in Neon Bedroom
- Streetwalkin' (1985) - Heather
- Key Exchange (1985) - Chiropractor Woman
- Project X (1987) - Carol Lee
- Crossing Delancey (1988) - Karen
- True Believer (1989) - Laura Gayley
- Immediate Family (1989) - Kathy
- Unlawful Entry (1992) - Penny, Karen's Friend
- Love Field (1992) - Police Dispatcher (voice)
- Women: Stories of Passion (1997–1999, TV Series) - Christina / Caroline
- Girl (1998) - Cybil's Mom
- ER (1998, TV Series) - ICU Nurse
- Cruel Intentions (1999) - Mrs. Michalak
- It's the Rage (1999) - Secretary
- Cain Rose Up (1999) - Birdette Cain
- The Attic Expeditions (2001) - Dr. Coffey's Secretary
- Richard Roe (2001, Short) - Kathy
- Ted Bundy (2002) - Beverly
- The Guardian (2004, TV series) - Beth Jacobson
- Six Feet Under (2005, TV series) - Dr. Melnick
- CSI: Crime Scene Investigation (2005, TV Series) - Nosy Lady
- The Naked Brothers Band: The Movie (2005) - Miss Offner
- Medium (2007, TV Series) - Mrs. Ueberschaer
- Unearthed (2007) - Tanya the waitress
- Law & Order: Special Victims Unit (2007, TV Series) - Judge
- Hindsight (2008) - Manager
- Law & Order (2009, TV Series) - Judge Rachel Cates
- Black Swan (2010) - Administrator Susie
- Blue Bloods (2012–2016, TV Series) - Judge Katrina McCarthy
- High Maintenance (2013, TV Series) - Miriam
- Home (2014) - Sondra
- Top Five (2014) - Wendy (uncredited)
- The Boy Downstairs (2017) - Shannon
- Shiva Baby (2020) - Ellie
