= 0-8-4 =

- Agents of S.H.I.E.L.D. episode
- Samuel L. Jackson's cameo as Nick Fury during the episode's end tag was much talked about, being called both thrilling and unearned.
- Episode no.: Season 1 Episode 2
- Directed by: David Straiton
- Written by: Maurissa Tancharoen; Jed Whedon; Jeffrey Bell
- Cinematography by: Feliks Parnell
- Editing by: Paul Trejo
- Original air date: October 1, 2013
- Running time: 42 minutes

Guest appearances
- Leonor Varela as Camilla Reyes; Samuel L. Jackson as Nick Fury

Episode chronology
← Previous "Pilot"	Next → "The Asset"
- Agents of S.H.I.E.L.D. season 1

"0-8-4" is the second episode of the first season of the American television series Agents of S.H.I.E.L.D. Based on the Marvel Comics organization S.H.I.E.L.D., it follows Phil Coulson and his team of S.H.I.E.L.D. agents as they travel to Peru to investigate an object of unknown origins. It is set in the Marvel Cinematic Universe (MCU) and acknowledges the franchise's films. The episode was written by showrunners Maurissa Tancharoen, Jed Whedon, and Jeffrey Bell, and was directed by David Straiton.

Clark Gregg reprises his role as Coulson from the film series, starring alongside Ming-Na Wen, Brett Dalton, Chloe Bennet, Iain De Caestecker, and Elizabeth Henstridge. The episode is set in Peru, featuring guest star Leonor Varela as a member of the Peruvian military. Filming took place in July 2013 at the Los Angeles County Arboretum and Botanic Garden, with some location shooting in Peru. Composer Bear McCreary used ethnic instruments to support this setting. Tesseract technology is carried over from the films to tie-in with the conflict, while special guest star Samuel L. Jackson also reprises his film role of Nick Fury in a cameo appearance.

"0-8-4" originally aired on ABC on October 1, 2013, and was watched by 13.17 million viewers within a week. The episode received a mostly positive critical response, with Jackson's appearance considered a highlight by many, but also seen as unearned.

== Plot ==
Beginning immediately after "Pilot", "0-8-4" sees Skye accept Agent Phil Coulson's offer to join his S.H.I.E.L.D. team as a consultant. Though agents Melinda May and Grant Ward oppose this due to her hacktivist background and lack of S.H.I.E.L.D. training, Coulson believes that Skye can be an asset.

The team travels to Peru to investigate a reported 0-8-4 (the S.H.I.E.L.D. designation for "an object of unknown origin"). They find the object within an ancient Incan temple, and agents Leo Fitz and Jemma Simmons determine that it is Hydra-made: powered by the Tesseract and extremely volatile. The national military arrives to claim the weapon for the Peruvian government, led by Camilla Reyes, a former colleague of Coulson's. When they are all attacked by local rebels, the S.H.I.E.L.D. agents and soldiers escape with the weapon to the plane that serves as the agents' mobile base.

En route to a classified S.H.I.E.L.D. facility, tensions among the agents are high due to poor communication during the fight. This concerns Reyes, who decides to double-cross Coulson and secure the 0-8-4 for her government. Together, the agents devise a plan to activate the weapon, blowing a hole in the Bus. The drop in pressure opens the interior doors, allowing the agents to subdue the soldiers. At the facility, Reyes and her men are incarcerated and the 0-8-4 is launched into the sun in a rocket. The team watch the launch together, celebrating their combined efforts, while Ward agrees to supervise Skye's S.H.I.E.L.D. training. Skye secretly confirms her allegiance to the hacktivist group the Rising Tide.

In an end tag, S.H.I.E.L.D. Director Nick Fury scolds Coulson for the damage caused to the plane during the fight, and expresses his doubts over Skye's loyalty.

== Production ==
=== Development and design ===
ABC announced in May 2013 that it had ordered a full season of Agents of S.H.I.E.L.D. based on the pilot episode. That September, Marvel Television revealed that the second episode in the series was titled "0-8-4", and had been written by the series' showrunners Maurissa Tancharoen, Jed Whedon, and Jeffrey Bell, with David Straiton directing. The 0-8-4 device was created by prop master Scott Bauer to be "stylistic" yet "timeless" and its design was inspired by Art Deco.

=== Casting ===
Marvel confirmed in September 2013 that the episode would star main cast members Clark Gregg as Phil Coulson, Ming-Na Wen as Melinda May, Brett Dalton as Grant Ward, Chloe Bennet as Skye, Iain De Caestecker as Leo Fitz, and Elizabeth Henstridge as Jemma Simmons. They also announced the episode's guest cast, which includes Leonor Varela as Camilla Reyes and Carlos Leal as an archaeologist. Samuel L. Jackson makes a surprise cameo appearance at the end of the episode, reprising his role of S.H.I.E.L.D. director Nick Fury from the MCU films. Jackson had previously expressed interest in appearing in the show in June 2013. Executive producer Jeph Loeb said there were "a number of places that we thought Nick Fury would have a big impact on the show," ultimately settling on a cameo in this episode as a way to "kind of christen the show, legitimize it in its own way." Bell highlighted Marvel's security team and the dedication of the cast and crew to keeping Jackson's cameo a surprise despite "this age of tweets and spoilers".

=== Filming ===
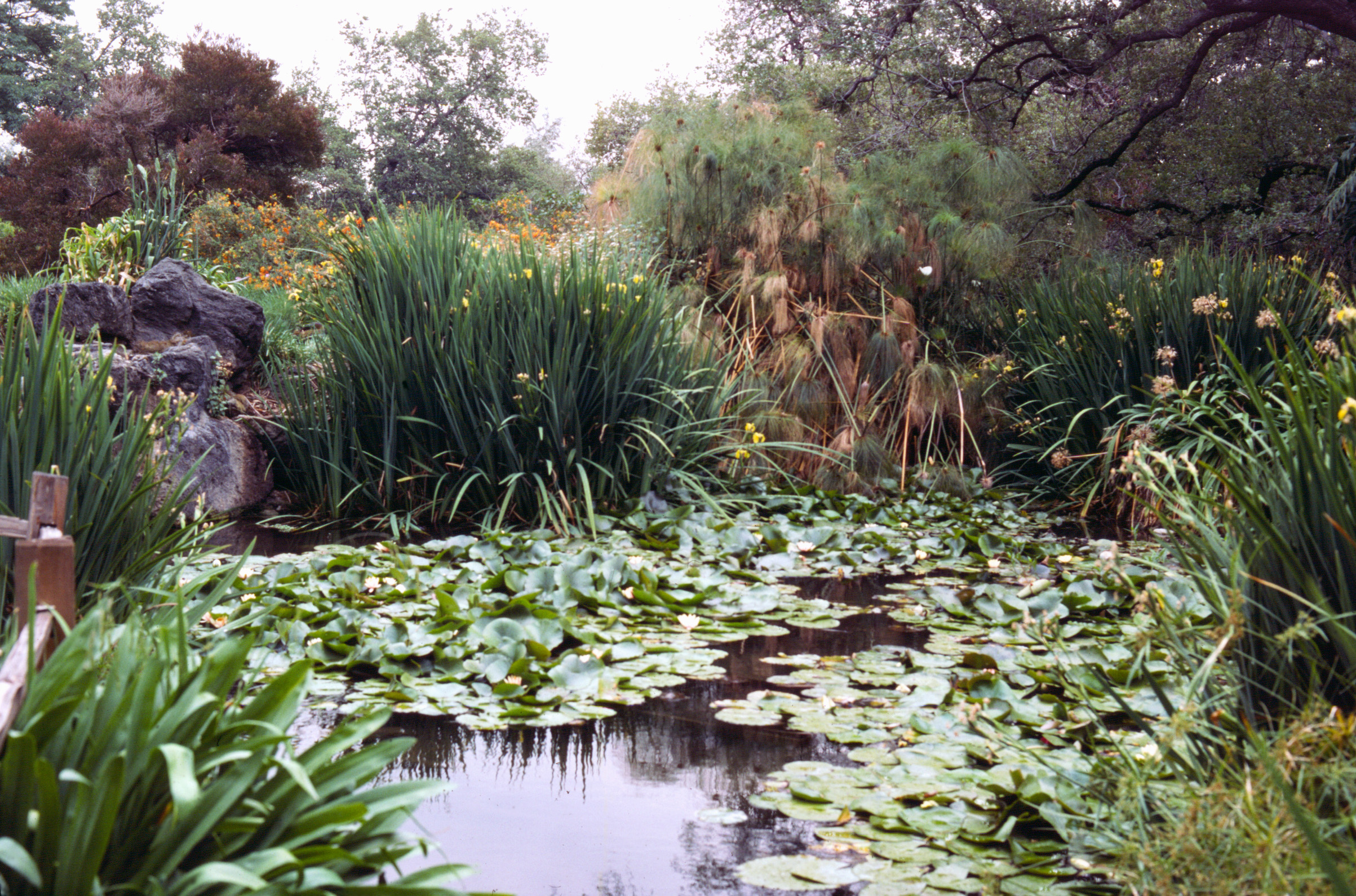
Filming took place at the Los Angeles County Arboretum and Botanic Garden, standing in for Peru

Filming for the episode occurred from July 17 to 29, 2013. The Peru setting was filmed at the Los Angeles County Arboretum and Botanic Garden, which has gardens dedicated to specific areas of the world, with some location shooting also occurring in Peru. The sequence in which a hole is blown in the side of the Bus was filmed in one day. The final shots utilized stunts and wirework, rigged explosives, wind machines, and green screen. Much of the Nick Fury scene was scripted, but Gregg ad-libbed the line about a proposed fish tank for the Bus.

=== Music ===
Composer Bear McCreary had a larger orchestra to work with on "0-8-4" than he did with the pilot, allowing him to compose a much more traditional and "grandiose" score. He also opted to expand his synthesizer use to be "beefier and more aggressive". The South American setting allowed McCreary to add an ethnic component to the score, with his frequent collaborators M.B. Gordy and Chris Bleth playing tribal-sounding drums and ethnic woodwinds, respectively. Guitarist Ed Trybek also recorded various South American guitars for the episode, including timple and charango.

=== Marvel Cinematic Universe tie-ins ===
The titular weapon is powered by the Tesseract, the macguffin of the MCU films Captain America: The First Avenger (2011) and The Avengers (2012). The "0-8-4" was made by Hydra, a fictional organization that also appeared in Captain America: The First Avenger. It is stated in the episode that the last object of unknown origin that S.H.I.E.L.D. encountered was "a hammer", referring to Thor's weapon Mjolnir which Coulson discovered on Earth during the events of the film Thor (2011). Coulson also refers to Skye as a consultant, which is how S.H.I.E.L.D. classified Tony Stark during Iron Man 2 (2010), The Avengers, and the Marvel One-Shot short film The Consultant (2011).

== Release ==
=== Broadcast ===
"0-8-4" was first aired in the United States on ABC on October 1, 2013. It was aired alongside the US broadcast in Canada on CTV, while it was first aired in the United Kingdom on Channel 4 on October 4, 2013. It premiered on the Seven Network in Australia on October 2, 2013.

=== Home media ===
The episode, along with the rest of Agents of S.H.I.E.L.D.'s first season, was released on Blu-ray and DVD on September 9, 2014. Bonus features include behind-the-scenes featurettes, audio commentary, deleted scenes, and a blooper reel. On November 20, 2014, the episode became available for streaming on Netflix. The episode, along with the rest of the series, was removed from Netflix on February 28, 2022, and later became available on Disney+ on March 16, 2022.

== Reception ==
=== Ratings ===
In the United States the episode received a 3.3/10 percent share among adults between the ages of 18 and 49, meaning that it was seen by 3.3 percent of all households, and 10 percent of all of those watching television at the time of the broadcast. It was watched by 8.66 million viewers. The Canadian broadcast gained 1.83 million viewers, the fourth highest for that day and the twelfth highest for the week. The United Kingdom premiere had 3.08 million viewers, and in Australia, the premiere had 2.8 million viewers, including 1.3 million timeshifted viewers. Within a week of its release, the episode was watched by 13.17 million U.S. viewers, above the season average of 8.31.

=== Critical response ===
MTV.com gave a positive review, saying "If tonight's installment is any indication, the cast will soon be able to support their own weight, make Coulson proud, and audiences sit up and pay attention", and comparing it positively to Tarzan, Beastmaster, and Mutant X. Terri Schwartz of Zap2it also gave a particularly positive review, praising both the connections to the films, including Jackson's cameo, and the internal development of the show, namely that of the character Skye and the team as a whole. Dan Casey of Nerdist called "0-8-4" "a strong second episode, [which] managed to course-correct from some of the missteps of the pilot". He praised the "solid mix of action, character development, and humor" and concluded that the episode was "genuinely enjoyable television". Eric Goldman of IGN scored the episode 7.5 out of 10, comparing it positively to The A-Team and Indiana Jones, praising its self-awareness, Jackson's cameo, and the development of Coulson's character, but criticizing the lack of development for other characters.

Oliver Sava of The A.V. Club called the episode "an adequate hour of action-adventure television, but the first 59 minutes are missing the spark of the final post-credits scene", seeing room for improvement for all the cast members, and concluding that the show falls "somewhere between Firefly and Dollhouse on the spectrum of Whedon TV influences". Graeme Virtue of The Guardian called Gregg "Agents of S.H.I.E.L.D.'s greatest asset", finding the Jackson cameo to be a "thrill", but that "plot-wise, things perhaps still feel a little inconsequential". The Hollywood Reporter's Marc Bernardin praised the scale of the episode, describing it as coming "out of the gate like a blockbuster", but criticized its ambitions, asking "Shouldn't this show be, well, nuttier? [...] Agents of S.H.I.E.L.D. needs to unhinge itself, but good, and not just be a procedural." He also singled out Skye and May as being unfocused and underdeveloped, respectively, as characters, and he felt the Jackson cameo "gave the whole thing a charge that, in truth, it didn't really earn." Jim Steranko, known for his work on Nick Fury, Agent of S.H.I.E.L.D., found the episode to be "smoother [than "Pilot"], although more formulaic". He criticized the plot and characters, but praised Jackson's cameo as "an electrifying reminder of what the series could and should be."
