= Believe in Me (2006 film) =

- Theatrical release poster
- Directed by: Robert Collector
- Written by: Robert Collector
- Produced by: Caldecot Chubb; John Bard Manulis
- Starring: Jeffrey Donovan; Samantha Mathis; Bruce Dern
- Cinematography: James L. Carter
- Edited by: Anthony Redman
- Music by: David Torn
- Distributed by: IFC Films
- Release date: February 6, 2006 (Santa Barbara International Film Festival)
- Running time: 131 minutes
- Country: United States
- Language: English

Believe in Me is a 2006 American sports drama film directed by Robert Collector, and starring Jeffrey Donovan, Samantha Mathis and Bruce Dern. The film was shot in various locations in New Mexico. The film is based on the novel Brief Garland by Harold Keith. The novel is about Keith's real life nephew, Jim Keith.

== Plot ==
Clay Driscoll, a young coach from Louisiana with dreams of being the head coach of a successful boys' basketball team, is hired by an Oklahoma superintendent to coach basketball. Driscoll immediately finds himself in conflict with the head of the school board, Ellis Brawley, who is also the great-great grandson of the town's founder, the owner of the bank, and the most influential man in the town. The superintendent did not ask Brawley about the hire, and now is off recovering from a medical condition. Brawley has hired another man to coach the schools' boys' basketball team, and has relegated newcomer Driscoll to the unenviable job of coaching the girls' team. Early 1960s Oklahoma is in the midst of a drought, and the school and town are facing economic distress. High school sports are an integral part of the town's fabric and pride, but girls' sports are an afterthought and receive little attention. The girls' team is more akin to a gym class than a basketball program. Clay is crushed by the news that the job he came for has gone to “someone more qualified”, and he sees no future in coaching the girls.

With his future uncertain, Driscoll begins his task of coaching the girls' team with little understanding of his players. Saying he only knows how to coach one way, he addresses his girls with the same discipline and determination he would with a boys' team, but is bewildered at times by their rigid interpretation of his direction. He is often at a loss to deal with their play and their reactions to his coaching. With the support, encouragement and insight of his wife Jean, he is able to understand the girls he is coaching and reach them. Unbeknownst to Driscoll, his drive and commitment to win is infectious. The girls accept what he asks of them, and they become committed to working hard to be as good as they can be. With the first year behind him and an offer to assist a boys' team at another school, Clay decides to stay on and coach the Lady Cyclones. The following year his team shows a marked improvement, and they become a tough team to beat. However Driscoll and his girls' basketball program are challenged every step of the way by Brawley, who is threatened by Driscoll and is willing to use the school board to undercut him. Driscoll and Jean fight the system and work to heal a wound in their own marriage. The community rallies behind Driscoll and the girls as they make a run for the state playoffs.

== Cast ==
- Jeffrey Donovan as Clay Driscoll
- Samantha Mathis as Jean Driscoll
- Bruce Dern as Ellis Brawley
- Bob Gunton as Hugh Moreland
- Chris Ellis as Jim Stovall
- Ryil Adamson as Myerson
- Pamela Atherton as Ruth Selman
- Kristin Brye as Pat Thompson
- Mike Carlucci as Basketball TV Announcer (voice)
- Paula Criss as Mrs. Blair
- Camilla DeRamus as Mrs. Johnson
- Jamie Dickerson as Liz Blair
- Sean Dugan as The Heckler
- Chris Ellis as Jim Stovall
- Brandi Engel as Candy Brown
- Chelsea Grear as Melba Johnson

== Critical reception ==
The film received mixed reviews on Rotten Tomatoes, holding a 60% on 10 total reviews. Entertainment Tonight's film critic Leonard Maltin gave it three stars and wrote "Sincere heartland story rises above its familiar sports-underdog formula. Donovan and Mathis (as his supportive wife) are first rate."

Robert Koehler, the film critic for Variety magazine gave the film a mixed review. He noted the number of basketball films being released at that time, and predicted: "Even with ties to the true story of high school hoops coach Jim Keith and his unlikely triumph with a 1960s Oklahoma high school girls' squad, the hackneyed, overlong Believe in Me is much too similar to a recent flood of inspirational basketball pics to distinguish it. Carefully -- perhaps too much so -- crafted by writer-director Robert Collector as a tale of overcoming tall odds, pic will send out minor ripples in a large ocean of similar midrange indie projects and will have a hard time scoring in any commercial niche."

== Awards ==
Wins

- Jackson Hole Film Festival: Cowboy Award, Best Feature Film, Robert Collector; Best Score, David Torn. 2006
- Jackson Hole Film Festival: Rosemount Diamond Award, Robert Collector. 2006

== See also ==
- List of basketball films
