= Hindsight (2008 film) =

- Directed by: Paul Holahan
- Written by: Brooke Purdy
- Produced by: Francey Grace; Julie Sandor
- Starring: Leonor Varela; Jeffrey Donovan; Waylon Payne; Miranda Bailey; Richard Riehle; Deborah Offner; Arnell Powell
- Cinematography: Paul Holahan
- Edited by: Shawna Callahan
- Music by: Allen Towbin (original score)
- Production company: Ambush Entertainment
- Distributed by: Echo Bridge Home Entertainment
- Release dates: February 9, 2008 (Victoria Independent Film and Video Festival)
- Running time: 96 minutes
- Country: United States
- Language: English

Hindsight is a 2008 American thriller film produced by Ambush Entertainment. It stars Leonor Varela, Jeffrey Donovan, Waylon Payne, Miranda Bailey, Richard Riehle, Deborah Offner and Arnell Powell and is directed by Paul Holahan.

== Plot ==
Young and broke couple Dina and Ron put their unborn baby up for adoption online. They get a response from a wealthy married couple, Paul and Maria, who are willing to pay up front for the adoption. Dina and Ron arrive at their home and are welcomed in. But, Ron and Dina have a plan in their mind. They are to take their money to buy a new home and not give them the baby. However, Maria and Paul fight back.

== Cast ==
- Miranda Bailey as Dina
- Waylon Payne as Ron
- Jeffrey Donovan as Paul
- Leonor Varela as Maria

== Reception ==
Cinemagazine rated the film 1.5 stars.
