= Steve Reevis =

Native American actor (1962–2017)

- Born: August 14, 1962; Browning, Montana, U.S.
- Died: December 7, 2017 (aged 55); Missoula, Montana, U.S.
- Education: Haskell Indian Junior College (AA)
- Years active: 1988–2017
- Spouse: Macile Reevis (m. 1991)
- Children: 3

Steve Reevis (August 14, 1962 – December 7, 2017) was a Native American (Blackfeet) actor who had roles in the films Fargo, Last of the Dogmen, and Dances with Wolves.

== Early life and education ==
Steve Reevis was born on August 14, 1962, in Browning, Montana, to father Lloyd "Curley" and mother Lila Reevis. The fourth oldest of six children, he had two brothers and three sisters. Reevis grew up on the Blackfeet Indian Reservation in northwestern Montana.

Reevis attended and graduated from Flandreau Indian School in Flandreau, South Dakota. Following high school graduation, he attended Haskell Indian Junior College in Lawrence, Kansas, where he received an associate of arts degree.

== Career ==
Reevis' first movie appearance was with his brother, Tim Reevis, as a stunt rider in the 1987 film War Party. Reevis' first acting role was in 1988 in the Universal Studios film Twins, starring Arnold Schwarzenegger and Danny DeVito. Following Twins, he was cast in a nonspeaking role as a Sioux Warrior in the 1990 Kevin Costner film, Dances with Wolves. Reevis was next cast as Chato, an Apache scout, in Geronimo: An American Legend with fellow-Native actor Wes Studi. In 1995, Reevis played Yellow Wolf in Last of the Dogmen alongside Tom Berenger and Barbara Hershey.

He was cast in the critically acclaimed 1996 film, Fargo as well as the made-for-television movie, Crazy Horse. Reevis was honored with awards for his roles in both movies by First Americans in the Arts (FAITA) in 1996. In 2004, Reevis was once again honored by FAITA for his work on the ABC series Line of Fire.

Reevis appeared in Columbia’s 2003 film The Missing, in the 2005 remake of The Longest Yard, and in TNT's 2005 miniseries Into the West. Reevis also appeared on Fox's drama series Bones.

== Personal life and death ==
In 1991, Reevis married his wife, Macile, a member of the Choctaw tribe, an artist, and a clothing designer. Together, they lived in Morongo Valley, California, and the Missoula, Montana, area and had four children together. Reevis died on December 7, 2017, of undisclosed causes in Missoula, at the age of 55. At the time of his death, he was survived by his wife, their children, and three grandchildren.

== Filmography ==
=== Film ===
Year	Title	Role	Notes
1988	Twins	Indian	
1990	Grim Prairie Tales	Indian Child	
1990	Dances with Wolves	Sioux #1 / Warrior #1	
1991	The Doors	Indian In Desert	
1993	Posse	Two Bears	
1993	Geronimo: An American Legend	Chato	
1995	Last of the Dogmen	Yellow Wolf	
1995	Wild Bill	Sioux Chief 'He Who Whistles'	
1996	Follow Me Home	Freddy	
1996	Fargo	Shep Proudfoot	
1999	The Outfitters	Sam Keno	
2000	Highway 395	Sim Lundy	
2003	The Missing	Two Stone	
2005	The Longest Yard	Bob "Baby Face Bob" Rainwater	
2013	The Cherokee Word for Water	Johnson Soap	
2014	Road to Paloma	Totonka	
2014	The Jingle Dress	Buff	
2015	Fishing Naked	Art	

=== Television ===
Year	Title	Role	Notes
1991	Miracle in the Wilderness	Grey Eyes	Television film
1996	Promised Land	Sheriff Lamont Nez	Episode: "The Outrage"
1997, 1999	Walker, Texas Ranger	John Wolf / Lone Wolf / Jake Stonecrow	2 episodes
1998	JAG	Sammy Wheeler	Episode: "The Return of Jimmy Blackhorse"
1999	Lakota Moon	Two Hearts	Television film
1999	Horse Sense	"Mule"	Television film
2000	Wild Grizzly	Jack Buck	Television film
2002	Malcolm in the Middle	Enoch	Episode: "Poker #2"
2004	Line of Fire	Dwight Baylow	Episode: "Eminence Front: Part 2"
2004	LAX	Hawk Man	Episode: "Finnegan Again, Begin Again"
2005	Into the West	Older Loved By The Buffalo	Episode: "Hell on Wheels"
2005	Bones	Ranger Sherman Rivers	Episode: "The Man in the Bear"
2008	Comanche Moon	Worm	3 episodes
2010	Monsterwolf	Chief Turner	Television film
