= Come Early Morning =

- Theatrical release poster
- Directed by: Joey Lauren Adams
- Written by: Joey Lauren Adams
- Produced by: Julie Yorn; Holly Wiersma; Michel Litvak; Ed Bass
- Starring: Ashley Judd; Jeffrey Donovan; Tim Blake Nelson; Laura Prepon; Scott Wilson; Stacy Keach; Diane Ladd
- Cinematography: Tim Orr
- Edited by: Meg Reticker
- Music by: Alan Brewer
- Production company: Bold Films
- Distributed by: Roadside Attractions
- Release dates: January 20, 2006 (Sundance); November 10, 2006 (limited)
- Running time: 97 minutes
- Country: United States
- Language: English

Come Early Morning is a 2006 American independent romantic drama film starring Ashley Judd and Jeffrey Donovan. It marked the directorial debut of Joey Lauren Adams. The film was shot throughout the metropolitan Little Rock, Arkansas area including Pulaski Heights, and Adams' hometown of North Little Rock. The film was an official selection for the 2006 Sundance Film Festival. It premiered for wide release in Little Rock on December 14, 2006.

== Plot summary ==
Lucy Fowler, a construction firm employee, has a habit of drinking on weekends, having a one-night stand, and, come early morning, waking up and leaving quickly, checking out and paying for the motel room.

Through her grandmother, she finds out that her father, a shy man who has nothing to say to her, is back in town, and eventually she goes to his new church. During a visit to her local bar, called The Forge, she runs into a woman who slept with her father. A brawl begins and she is rescued by Cal Percell, a new guy in town. She attends church with her father on Sunday morning with a beaten up face.

Carting around a jukebox she bought from the bar, she has a beer with Cal and gives him an invitation to ask her out. She kisses him sober, but still has demons to confront.

She has sex with him that night and tries to leave the next morning without him noticing but he wakes up and gives her a ride. Eventually she apologizes.

== Cast ==
- Ashley Judd as Lucy Fowler
- Jeffrey Donovan as Cal Percell
- Tim Blake Nelson as Uncle Tim
- Laura Prepon as Kim
- Scott Wilson as Lowell Fowler
- Stacy Keach as Owen
- Diane Ladd as Nana
- Ray McKinnon as Preacher Toby
- Nancy Wilder as Michelle
- Jeff Nichols as Lee Young

== Production ==
Joey Lauren Adams initially wrote the film with plans of acting in it, but she ultimately chose to direct instead.

Filming was completed in five weeks. The film was shot in Adams' hometown of North Little Rock, including Little Rock, Lonoke, and surrounding counties.

== Reception ==
=== Release ===
The film premiered at the 2006 Sundance Film Festival, where it competed for the Grand Jury Prize for Dramatic Feature. It received a limited theatrical release from Roadside Attractions on November 10, 2006.

=== Critical response ===
On Rotten Tomatoes, the film has an 84% rating based on 49 reviews. The site's critics consensus reads, "A quiet but moving film anchored by the unexpected depth of Ashley Judd's performance." On Metacritic, the film has a score of a score of 64 based on 16 reviews, indicating "generally favorable" reviews.

Positive reviews praised Adams' directing debut, with plaudits in particular for Judd's performance. Jessica Reaves of the Chicago Tribune remarked, "Judd is the best thing in this movie" and that her role is handled with "aplomb and admirable nuance." Stephen Holden of The New York Times said, "[Adams] knows how these people speak and has a finely tuned awareness of their relationship to an environment where beer flows like water and the houses have cheap furniture and aluminum siding." He added, "Ms. Judd plays [Lucy] with a vindictive edge that risks making her unsympathetic. And that takes courage."

Tasha Robinson of The A.V. Club said Judd's performance calls to mind her first significant role in Ruby in Paradise, but "she's rarely appeared as raw and vulnerable as she does in Come Early Morning." TV Guide noted "the film has a worn, live-in feel, and its unhurried narrative captures the subtle rhythms of small-town life. Nothing much happens on the surface, but worlds of hope, hurt and determination lie right behind the characters' eyes, waiting to be discovered."
