= Leonor Varela =

Chilean actress

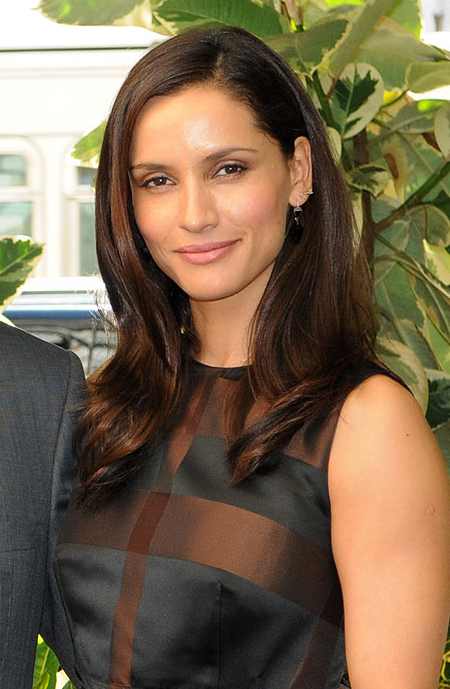
- Varela in 2010
- Born: Leonor Magdalena Varela Palma; 29 December 1972 (age 53); Santiago, Chile
- Occupation: Actress
- Years active: 1995–present
- Spouse: Lucas Akoskin (m. 2013)
- Children: 2

Leonor Magdalena Varela Palma (Spanish pronunciation: [leoˈnoɾ βaˈɾela]; born 29 December 1972) is a Chilean actress. She played the title role in the 1999 miniseries Cleopatra, and vampire princess Nyssa Damaskinos in the 2002 Marvel Comics film Blade II.

== Early life ==
Varela was born in Santiago, Chile, the daughter of Leonor Palma-Keller, a massage therapist, and biologist and cognitive neuroscientist Francisco Varela García. She has a sister, Alejandra, and two brothers, Javier and Gabriel. When Varela was a child, her family fled Chile after the 1973 military coup d'état.

== Career ==
Varela also had a short recurring role in the Fox Television series Arrested Development as the original Marta. She was nominated for the Ariel Award in 2005 in the category of Best Actress for Innocent Voices (2004). She also had a non-recurring role in Stargate: Atlantis.

In 2012, she appeared as Marta Del Sol on the TNT television series Dallas.

== Personal life ==
Varela was engaged to Billy Zane, her co-star in the 1999 miniseries Cleopatra, (aired in 1999, released to video in 2001).

She began dating producer Lucas Akoskin in 2011, and they married in April 2013. On 20 November 2012, Varela and Akoskin welcomed their first child together, a son named Matteo. Their daughter, Luna Mae, was born on 25 February 2015. Matteo was diagnosed with leukodystrophy (specifically AGS) shortly after his birth. He died at the age of 5 on 16 November 2018.

Varela, a vegetarian, is a marine life activist who is concerned with the welfare of whales, working with groups such as Save The Whales Again.

== Filmography ==
=== Film ===
Year	Title	Role	Director
1997	Le ciel est à nous	Vanessa	Graham Guit
1997	Bouge !	La danseuse	Jérôme Cornuau
1998	The Man in the Iron Mask	Ballroom Beauty	Randall Wallace
1999	Les parasites	Fidelia	Philippe de Chauveron
1999	Les infortunes de la beauté	Annabella	John Lvoff
2001	The Tailor of Panama	Marta	John Boorman
2001	Texas Rangers	Perdita	Steve Miner
2002	Blade II	Nyssa Damaskinos	Guillermo del Toro
2002	Paraíso B	Gloria	Nicolás Acuña
2003	Pas si grave	Angela	Bernard Rapp
2003	Tais-toi !	Katia / Sandra	Francis Veber
2004	Voces inocentes	Kella	Luis Mandoki
2005	Americano	Adela	Kevin Nolan
2007	Goal II: Living the Dream	Jordana Garcia	Jaume Collet-Serra
2007	Where God Left His Shoes	Angela Diaz	Salvatore Stabile
2008	Sleep Dealer	Luz Martinez	Alex Rivera
2008	Hell Ride	Nada	Larry Bishop
2008	Hindsight	Maria	Paul Holahan
2008	All Inclusive	Miranda	Rodrigo Ortúzar Lynch
2009	Balls Out: Gary the Tennis Coach	Norma Sanchez	Danny Leiner
2009	Wrong Turn at Tahoe	Anna	Franck Khalfoun
2010	Que pena tu vida	Alma Subercaseaux	Nicolás López
2011	Blind Alley	La Madre	Antonio Trashorras
2013	Odd Thomas	Odd's Mother	Stephen Sommers
2013	Deseo	Muchacha	Antonio Zavala Kugler
2014	A Fine Step	Liliana Bolivar	Jonathan Meyers
2014	Ride	Danielle	Helen Hunt
2015	Captive	Sgt. Carmen Sandoval	Jerry Jameson
2015	All I Wish	Bianca	Susan Walter
2018	Saving Flora	Isabella	Mark Drury Taylor
2018	Alpha	Shaman	Albert Hughes

=== Television ===
Year	Title	Role	Notes
1995	Extrême limite	Marie	"Sacrifice"
1995	Pony Trek	Anette	TV film
1996	Sous le soleil	Jeanne	"Comportement modèle"
1997	Le juste	Pregnant Girl	"En transit vers l'espoir"
1997	Tic Tac	Pola Santa María	Main role
1997	Inca de Oro	Flor de I'nca	TV film
1997	13th Rider	Anette	TV series
1998	Jeremiah	Judith	TV film
1999	Cleopatra	Cleopatra	TV miniseries
2003	Arrested Development	Marta Estrella	"Bringing Up Buster", "Key Decisions"
2004	Stargate Atlantis	Chaya Sar	"Sanctuary"
2005	E-Ring	Lt. Col. Cat Rodriguez	"Pilot"
2006	The Curse of King Tut's Tomb	Dr. Azelia Barakat	TV film
2007	Como Ama una Mujer	Sofia Marquez	TV miniseries
2010	Feroz	Laura Palma	Recurring role
2010	Monsterwolf	Maria	TV film
2010-2011	Human Target	Maria Gallego	"Salvage & Reclamation", "A Problem Like Maria"
2012	Dallas	Marta Del Sol	Recurring role
2012	Inland Empire	Poopy	TV film
2013	Agents of S.H.I.E.L.D.	Camilla Reyes	"0-8-4"
2015	Murder in Mexico: The Bruce Beresford-Redman Story	Monica	TV film
2018	Lethal Weapon	Sofia Vasquez	TV series
