= Marta Del Sol =

- Dallas character
- Portrayed by: Leonor Varela
- Duration: 2012
- First appearance: June 13, 2012; Changing of the Guard
- Last appearance: July 18, 2012; Collateral Damage
- Introduced by: Cynthia Cidre
In-universe information
- Other names: Veronica Martinez

Veronica Martinez known by her alias Marta Del Sol is a fictional character from the American soap opera Dallas, played by Leonor Varela. The characters of J.R. Ewing (Larry Hagman) and John Ross Ewing (Josh Henderson) feature heavily in Marta's storyline. Marta partners with the duo and they attempt to steal the Southfork Ranch from Bobby Ewing (Patrick Duffy). Marta falls in love with John Ross and Varela said that it is one of Marta's more genuine moments. But she believed that John Ross would never be able to maintain the same respect for her. With similar personalities they are well matched; but John Ross' relationship with Elena Ramos (Jordana Brewster) causes Marta to become jealous and obsessive. Varela's departure was announced in July 2012. Marta was murdered and John Ross wrongly accused of the crime.

Varela's casting was announced in July 2011. She wanted to join the show because the legacy it had created. She thought Marta was to be an environmentalist and do-gooder, but she soon learned that Dallas writers had created a manipulative villain. Varela has stated that her character is not one-dimensional and is complex with both strengths and weaknesses. Marta also has bipolar disorder and Varela researched the condition via vlogs and movies. She decided that a "subtle nuance" of the illness better suited Marta. Cynthia Cidre, who produced and wrote for Dallas created an "in-depth background" for the character. This and Marta's villain status helped gain Varela more freedom in her portrayal.

Various critics have analysed the character's mental state. Most have concluded that Marta is a "crazy" character. Digital Spy's Alex Fletcher opined that Marta became more "dark and ludicrously disturbing" with each episode. Terry Linwood from D Magazine called her an "all-around psycho" and bunny boiler. But Jarett Wieselman from Entertainment Tonight said that Marta epitomised Dallas' key themes of "shocking revelations, devious double-crosses and smoking hot stars".

== Casting ==
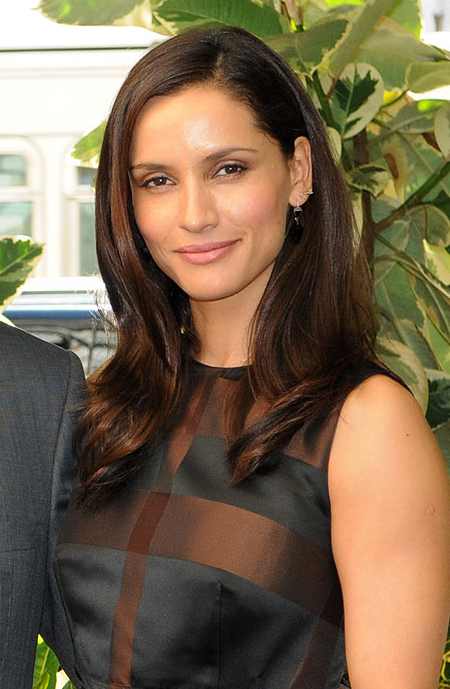
Leonor Varela (pictured) was attracted to the "Dallas legacy" when she auditioned for Marta.

Varela's casting was announced in July 2011. She had already filmed the pilot episode of the series and was surprised by the outcome. During the audition process the actress had to "fight" for the role. Varela was attracted to the role because she believed that Dallas was "legendary" and had a "legacy". While interviewed for La Segunda she said that the show's production company Warner Bros. Television and the broadcaster TNT both had to approve of her casting before it was finalized.

== Character development ==
=== Characterization ===
Marta was originally meant to be an environmentalist and fill the role of opposition to the Ewing's plans to drill for oil on the Southfork Ranch. Varela told a writer from El Mercurio that "Marta is a sophisticated woman, educated, smart and professional. Immediately I identified with her." She added that she would find her own life experiences useful while playing Marta. When Varela auditioned for the role she was unaware that the writers had planned for Marta to be manipulative. She told Gabrielle Chung of Celebuzz that the writers had been "sneaky bastards" and not told her how the storyline would develop.

As Varela told La Segunda's writer, Marta had been developed in a different way to what she had expected. She had to create and interpret a character that was "very different" and far removed from herself. But she enjoyed it more because Marta is a not one dimensional, she is "complex, has strengths and weaknesses". Varela did find certain scenes involving Marta's scenes difficult. She did not reveal specific details because she felt that it would ruin the viewing experience as Marta brings "intrigue, suspense and surprises" to Dallas. In Marta's backstory men had emotionally hurt her - but as Valera noted “I think Marta is a woman that has been through a lot. She has seen it all and has been played with too many times to be played again. She’s a tough cookie!"

Marta is a loose cannon, nearly capable of anything with flexible ethics and morality. She is ruthless, emotional and unstable which creates a dangerous combination of traits. A character with a range of "little intricacies and instabilities" left Varela shocked. But she was delighted with the freedom that came with portraying an unstable character. Cynthia Cidre, who produced and wrote for Dallas created an "in-depth background" for Marta which helped Varela. Marta gains notoriety as the villain of the first season and she told Carolina Cerda Maira from Latercera that it was fun. Even more fun and entertaining was not working within the "classical canons of good" and playing a Dallas villain with a "touch of madness". She noted that Marta was not a caricature and suffered from bipolar disorder. To research the condition Varela studied the condition from a "clinical standpoint". She also watched movies with bipolar protagonist such as Mr. Jones. Viewing YouTube vlogs of young people with the condition's "highs (mania) and lows (depression)" helped her to understand that there was "a very large range of this disease". As a result, Varela decided to portray a "subtle nuance" of the illness because she felt it was more "believable" for Marta.

=== Involvement with J.R. and John Ross Ewing ===
"My character so smart and extremely ambitious, and so well written, as is the entire show. Viewers hopefully will enjoy watching our characters explore their complicated relationship. They are both so goal oriented and very complex and they do have a past history together that will be explained during the season."

— Varela on Marta and John Ross (2012)

In December 2011, a photograph released via the Associated Press revealed that Varela was filming alongside Larry Hagman and Josh Henderson who play J.R. Ewing and John Ross Ewing respectively. Marta gets involved with John Ross and seduces him as part of her plan to secure the Southfork Ranch from the Ewing family. Varela told Chung that she was not nervous while filming sex scenes with Henderson. She felt in control and directed the logistics of the sex scene. She added that "It was just fun and you get to be very creative. All the stuff that’s there is just stuff from my twisted imagination."

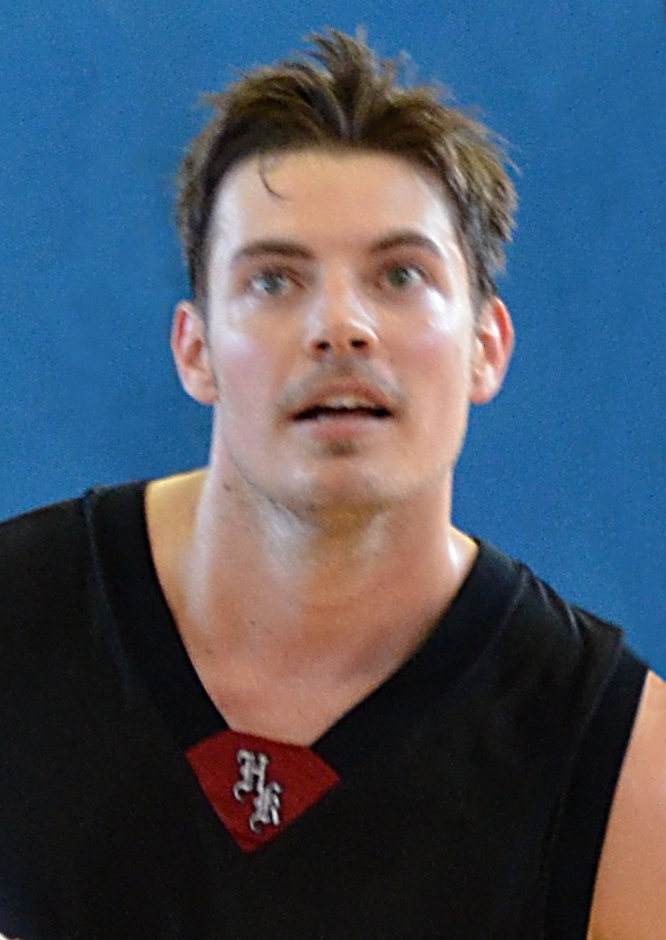
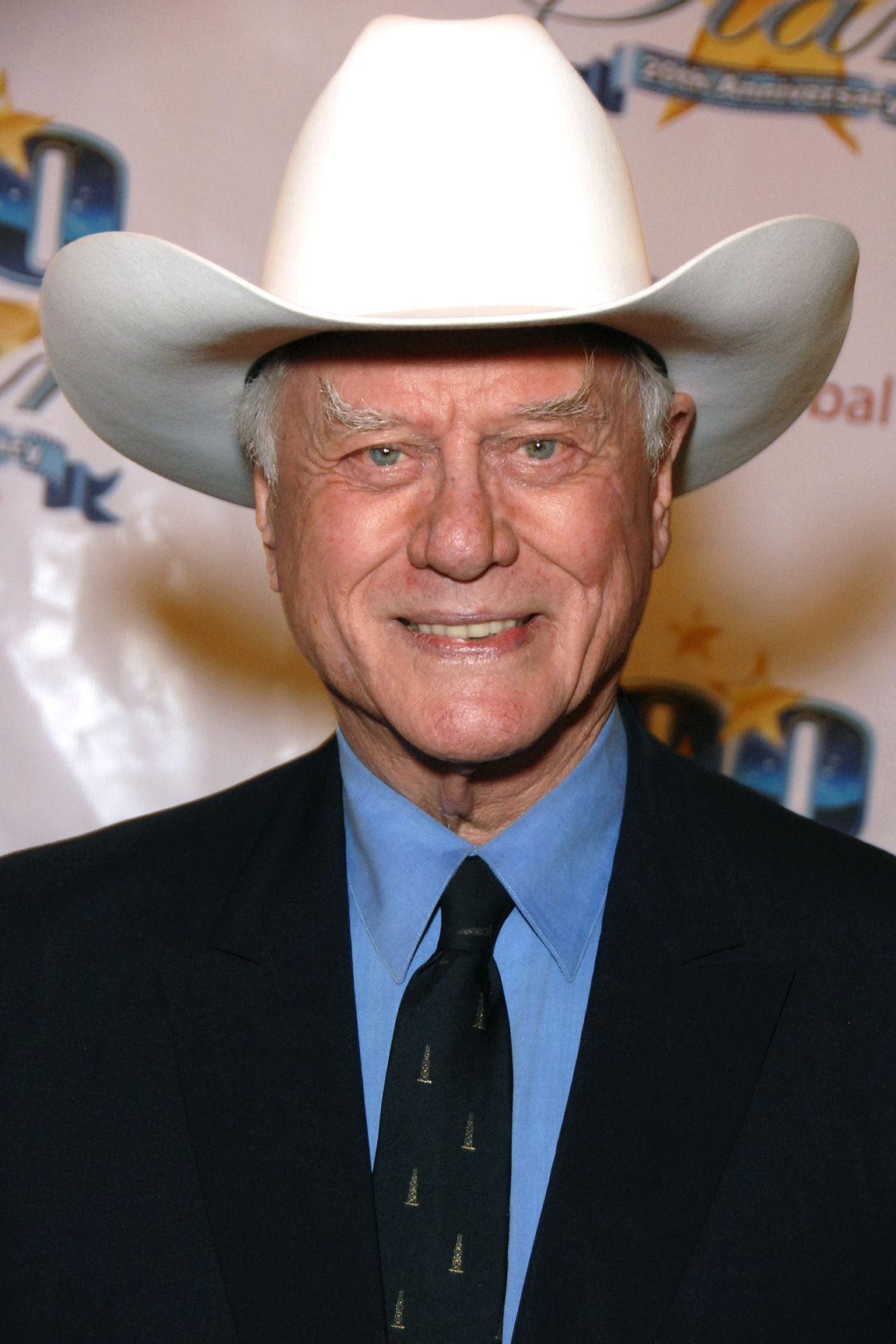
Josh Henderson (left) and Larry Hagman (right) portray John Ross and J.R. Ewing.

Varela felt that Marta was more than a villain because "she is very ambitious in the sense that she can do what it takes to get the job done. At the same time, she also has a true weakness for John Ross Jr." Varela explained that Marta's genuine feelings for John Ross made her more "relatable to as a character". Valera decided her character loved John Ross from the pilot episode when she makes a "truly genuine gesture" towards him. She believed that John Ross would not always give Marta the same respect and ultimately be her downfall. She told Danielle Turchiano from Examiner.com that Marta is "totally crazy" about John Ross because he has everything she wants. They are well matched and share "a ruthless way about them". They create a "warped sense of reality" because neither think of the consequences and she is bipolar. They also share the same goals which originally bring the pair together.

In her dealings with the Ewing family, Marta steals the Southfork Ranch from Bobby Ewing (Patrick Duffy). She then helps John Ross in his attempts to con J.R. Marta begins taking pills and becomes more unstable over time. In one episode she manages to shock J.R. when he discovers she is not Marta Del Sol but an imposter. She told Jen Heger from Radar Online that "Marta will have to suffer the consequences for double crossing J.R. Ewing."

In July 2012, a reporter from the Toronto Sun said that Varela would be departing the series after Marta is killed following a fall from a balcony. Varela told Latercera's Cerda Maira that she always knew that Marta would only feature in the first seven episodes of the first season. But she did find it hard to say goodbye to Marta and her colleagues. She added that "I had grown fond of everyone and I had fun as both Veronica/Marta and did not want it to end. But everything has an end and so I could give way to another stage of my life, I am also happy to be alive."

== Storylines ==
Marta helps J.R. with a plan to reclaim control of Southfork and is introduced to his son John Ross. They begin to plot to remove J.R. from the deal. John Ross is upset that his relationship with Elena Ramos (Jordana Brewster) has ended and he goes back to Marta's hotel room for sex. She drugs him and records their sex session. She manages to convince Bobby to sell the ranch to her. J.R. goes to visit the Del Sol family who claim to be unaware of Marta's plans. He is introduced to the real Marta Del Sol and realizes he has been doing business with a fraud. Marta is revealed to be named "Veronica Martinez", but she carries on posing under her new identity. He warns Marta to never scam him again and lets her in on the new deal with Vicente Cano (Carlos Bernard).

J.R. and Marta cut John Ross out of the new deal. J.R. discovers that Marta has a history of stalking men. Marta arranges a series of dates with John Ross but he does not turn up and spends time with Elena. Marta becomes angry and hands him the recording of them having sex. Marta begins to follow John Ross and Elena. She breaks into Elena's home and sticks a knife through a picture of John Ross and Elena kissing.

John Ross asks Vicente for more time to meet an oil shipment deadline. In exchange he tells him that Marta has been stealing money from the deal and stalking him. He requests that Vincente attempt to get her to leave town. Marta follows Elena and steals her mobile phone. She calls John Ross and pretends that she has kidnapped Elena and in exchange for her freedom he has to meet with her. She bemoans John Ross for getting Vincente to go after her. She reveals that she has money and would like to leave with John Ross. He rebuffs her advances and during a fracas she scratches John Ross' neck. As he leaves two of Vincente's henchmen arrive and throw Marta off her balcony. As John Ross was seen leaving her room beforehand, he is charged with murder.

== Reception ==
"She is bipolar and apparently doesn’t handle breakups well, having stalked ex-lovers and, on one occasion, attacking one with a knife. If jealousy were weapons-grade, then Marta/Veronica is a copy of The Bell Jar and two Tori Amos songs away from DEFCON 1."

— Terry Linwood from D Magazine on Marta. (2012)

Alex Fletcher from Digital Spy described Marta as John Ross' "scheming partner in crime" and a Us Weekly columnist named her a "sexy villain". A reporter from The Huffington Post branded her a "villainous vixen". Access Hollywood's Jodie Lash said that Varela had been "heating up" the show as "the bad and mad girl who's been causing trouble for John Ross and his father, J.R. Ewing." She added that Marta "really brings out the crazy" on John Ross. Mandi Bierly of Entertainment Weekly described the character as "a woman with anger issues who's into bondage and filmed her sexcapade with John Ross." She later opined mixing champagne and lithium in a revenge plot would come naturally to Marta and predicted that she would end up murdered. Terry Linwood from D Magazine called her an "all-around psycho", "psychohosebeast", "crazy" and a bunny boiler.

Jarett Wieselman from Entertainment Tonight said that "Dallas was second-to-none when it came to shocking revelations, devious double-crosses and smoking hot stars. TNT's Dallas is picking up right where the original left off and rolling all of those attributes into one character: Leonor Varela's "Marta Del Sol." A writer from the International Business Times said that Marta turned out to be "shady a character as anyone and could give those Ewing boys a run for their money." A reporter from Inside Soap said that Marta had a history of "violence fuelled by jealousy" and was "as stable as a bucking bronco at the Southfork rodeo". Digital Spy's Fletcher held a similar opinion, naming her as John Ross' "psychotic bit on the side", "crazy former lover", "crazy eyed date raper" and a "crazy-eyed drug-sex woman". Fletcher stated that Marta became more "dark and ludicrously disturbing" as the series progressed. He predicted that she would be murdered by the end of the series. The writer concluded that "when not watching her own violent, druggy sex tapes, she's making threats to John Ross, doing some crazy-eye, head-wobbling manic acting and generally causing mayhem for the entire Southfork clan." Vanessa Millones from Latina magazine also believed that Marta was crazy and lived up to the "Latina loca stereotype".
