= Monsterwolf =

- Genre: Horror
- Written by: Charles Bolon
- Directed by: Todor Chapkanov
- Country of origin: United States
- Original language: English

Production
- Producers: Kenneth M. Badish; Daniel Lewis
- Cinematography: Lorenzo Senatore
- Editor: Matt Taylor
- Running time: 90 minutes
- Production company: Bullet Films
- Budget: $1.5 million

Original release
- Network: Syfy
- Release: October 9, 2010

Monsterwolf is a 2010 Syfy original television film directed by Todor Chapkanov and stars Leonor Varela, Robert Picardo, and Marc Macaulay. An oil rig crew drills in a Louisiana community where they awaken an ancient and terrifying wolf-like beast sworn to protect the ecological balance of its environment - and kill anyone who threatens it. The film was part of Syfy's 31 Days of Halloween 2010 and premiered on Syfy October 9, 2010.

== Premise ==
In the small Southern town of Crowley, Louisiana, a group of people who represent an oil company find a new place to drill. However, they stumble upon a type of Native American shrine. They call upon their boss Stark (Robert Picardo) of Holter ex oil inc. He gives them permission to blow it up. When they set off an explosion, it unleashes a wolf-like creature that savagely kills all the workers. The following day, the dead men are discovered by Sheriff Bennet (Marc Macaulay). The ME is unsure what to make of it or even what killed them.

Meanwhile, Stark tries to negotiate with tribal Indian chief Turner (Steve Reevis) to let his company drill on their land, but Turner refuses. A New York defense lawyer, Maria Bennett (Leonor Varela), comes back after three years to represent Stark.

== Cast ==
- Leonor Varela as Maria
- Robert Picardo as Stark
- Marc Macaulay as Sheriff Bennett
- Steve Reevis as Chief Turner
- Jason London as Yale
- Jon Eyez as Coughlin
- Griff Furst as Chase
- Ricky Wayne as Deputy Higgins
- Nicole Barré as Crowell
- Amber Bartlett as Audrey
- Grant James as Burt

== Reception ==
Critical reception was negative. Dread Central rated the movie at 2 1/2 out of 5 blades, calling it "a fairly straightforward cliché-a-thon that wraps itself up in highly convenient third act character revelation that sure comes in handy when trying to send an eco-terrorist wolf monster back to its spiritual nature preserve. It’s also pretty watchable. I wouldn’t go so far as to call it pretty good, but it is certainly watchable in a nothing-better-on Saturday afternoon matinee sort of way." TV Spielfilm was ambivalent in their rating.

Curt Wagner for the Chicago Tribune panned Monsterwolf, criticizing it as "so bad it sucks - and it's not even about vampires!"
