= Mary, called Magdalene =

2002 novel by Margaret George

Mary, Called Magdalene
- Author: Margaret George
- Language: English
- Genre: Historical novel
- Published: Viking, 2002
- Publication place: United States
- Media type: Print (paperback)
- ISBN: 978-0670030965

Mary, called Magdalene is a 2002 historical novel by Margaret George about the Mary Magdalene.

== Plot summary ==
As a woman in the Bible, Mary Magdalene's story is not recounted as fully as that of some of the males associated with Jesus. The novel presents a new view of Mary Magdalene – a female apostle who was the first of Jesus' followers.

== Background and development ==
Author Margaret George, known for writing historical novels on such famous figures as Mary Queen of Scots and Cleopatra, decided to turn to the gospels for inspiration. She noted that they "provide me with something unique to build on. You inherit an existing curiosity about the characters, especially the more iconic ones, but very little detail. With what you might call the 'celebrities' like Mary Magdalene, you just have this outline of her life and the drama in it, even if it is shadowy, tantalisingly brief and potentially misleading".

== Reception ==
Mary, called Magdalene was released in 2002 by Viking. Some journalists have observed the increasing interest in Mary Magdalene, and have cited the popularity of George's novel as evidence of this trend. Mary, called Magdalene became a best-seller in 2002, followed by The Da Vinci Code in 2003. Books on Tape and Chivers Sound Library adapted the novel into sound recordings.

Publishers Weekly thought that the pacing of Mary, called Magdalene started out slow and then grew better once the titular character became possessed by demons, but called the final act of the book "safe, though readable". Maureen Dowd of The New York Times called the novel's premise – that Mary was a "good girl" rather than someone who tempts Jesus to evil – "intriguing". Dowd noted George's "rigorous research" but felt that she "goes a bit overboard with her feminist fable, turning Mary into the Gloria Steinem of Galilee". The reviewer concluded that "despite the demonic possession and all her dazzling adventures, this Mary never seems vivid or beguiling".
