= Margaret George =

American historical novelist (born 1943)

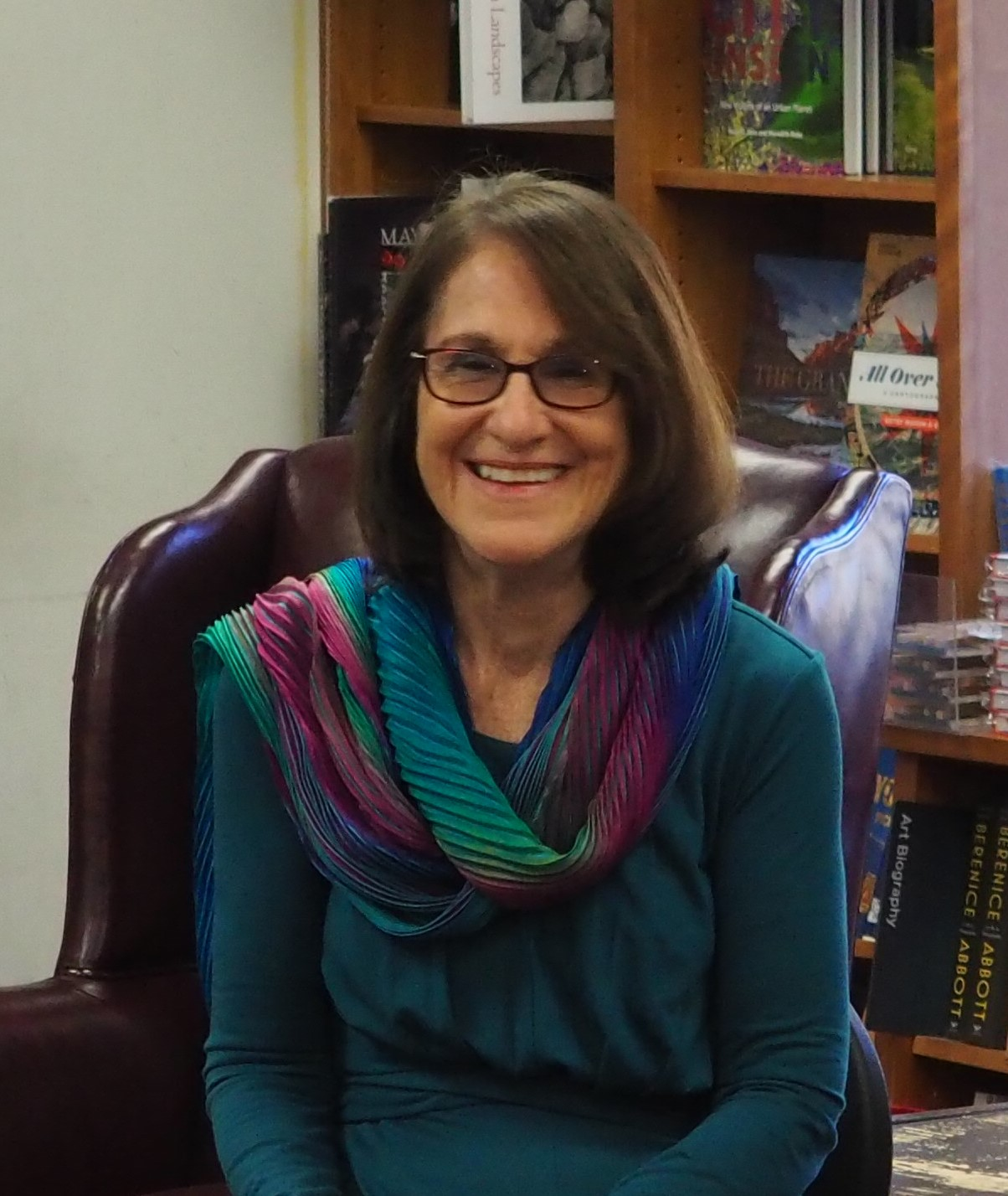
- Born: 1943 (age 82–83); Nashville, Tennessee, U.S.
- Education: Tufts University (BA); Stanford University (MA)
- Occupation: Author
- Writing career
- Genre: Historical
- Notable works: The Memoirs of Cleopatra; Mary, Called Magdalene

Margaret George (born 1943) is an American historical novelist specializing in epic fictional biographies. She is known for her meticulous research and the large scale of her books. She is the author of the bestselling novels The Autobiography of Henry VIII (1986), Mary Queen of Scotland and the Isles (1992), The Memoirs of Cleopatra (1997), Mary, Called Magdalene (2002), Helen of Troy (2006), Elizabeth I (2011), The Confessions of Young Nero (2017), and The Splendor Before the Dark (2018).

Several of these novels were New York Times bestsellers and the Cleopatra novel was made into an Emmy-nominated ABC-TV miniseries in 1999. Altogether the novels have been published in 21 languages. She is ranked at the forefront of historical novelists writing today.

Because of the detailed and accurate research behind her books, she has been a featured interviewee on A & E Biography (Henry VIII: Scandals of a King, 1996, and Elizabeth: The Virgin Queen, 1996) and a special on Alexandria (Cleopatra's World: Alexandria Revealed, 1999). She has also spoken at the Folger Shakespeare Library, Hampton Court the Tower of London, and twice at the Library of Congress's National Book Festival (2011, 2019).

In 2021, George authored an immersive audiovisual step inside a story tour for the Circus Maximus in Rome entitled The Charioteer on the BARDEUM mobile app.

== Life ==
Margaret George was born in Nashville, Tennessee in 1943. Her father joined the U.S. Foreign Service when she was four, and she lived overseas – Taiwan, Israel, and Germany – before she was thirteen. She was exposed early to historical sites and learned that legends might have historical bases.

She graduated from Tufts University with a B.A. and Stanford University with an M.A., co-majoring in biological science and English literature. She worked as a science writer for several years at the National Institutes of Health in Bethesda, Maryland before moving to Madison, Wisconsin with her husband.

== Writing career ==
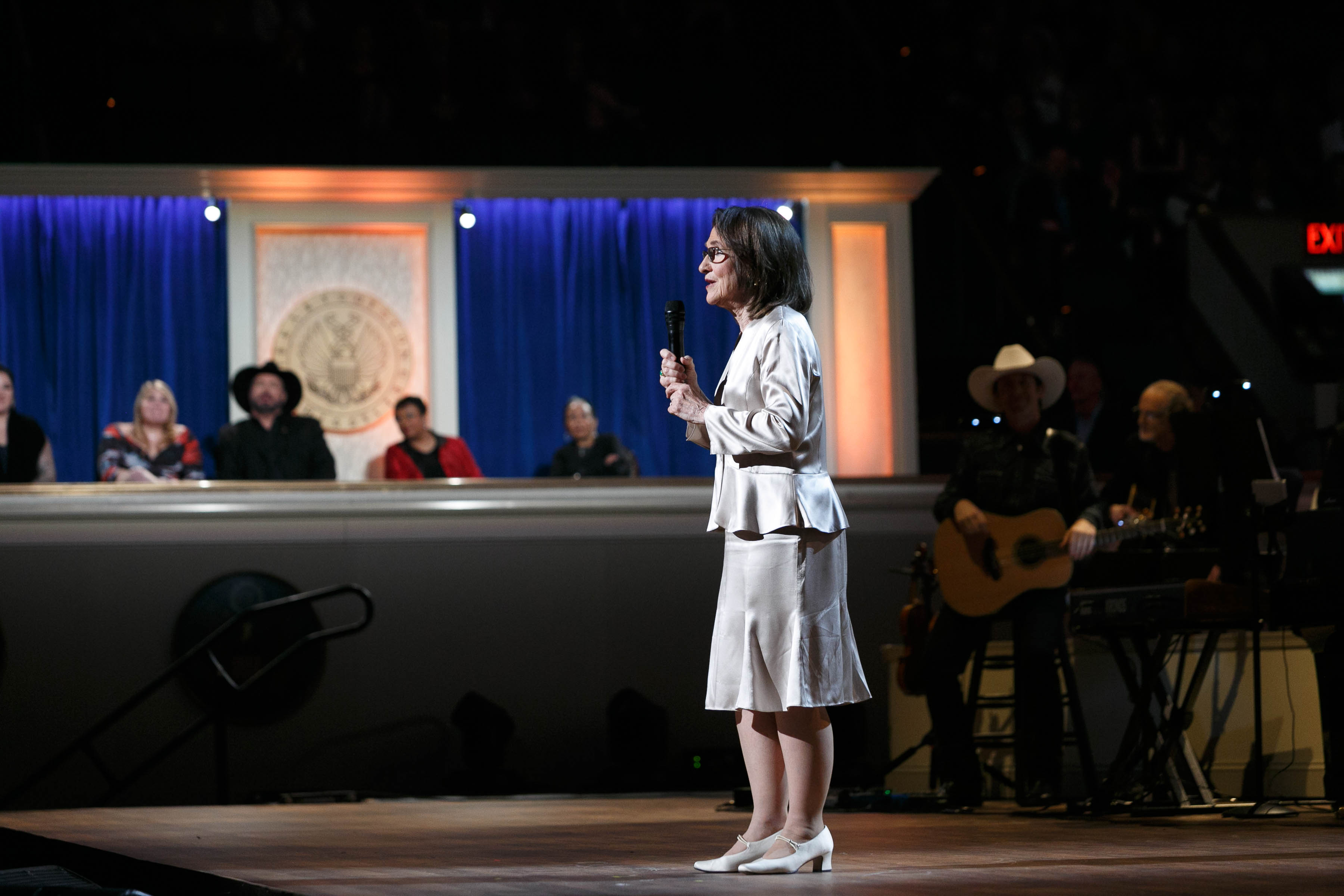
George speaks in 2020

She began writing at a very early age, composing on yellow lined tablets and illustrating them herself. By middle school, she had begun writing novels, but did not show them to anyone except a few close friends. Only when a book was completely finished did she try for publication. Although she is now known exclusively for historical tomes, she wrote in many genres as she was teaching herself to write.

Her first published novel, The Autobiography of Henry VIII (1986), set the pattern. It drew a sympathetic portrait of the notorious king without whitewashing the dishonorable episodes of his life. Almost thirty years after its publication, it is still influential and was at the top of the fans' recommended Henry VIII fiction list for The Tudors miniseries.

Her other books show the same key characteristics: careful research almost qualifying for non-fiction standards, enough length to give perspective to the subject's life, and colorful imagery. She says she aims to be on paper what David Lean's films are in visual terms: elegant, detailed, and panoramic.

Mary, Called Magdalene (2002) was published a year before Dan Brown's The Da Vinci Code and was based on the historical facts. Both books struck a chord with a public eager to know more about the enigmatic Mary of Magdala, a close companion of Jesus.

Helen of Troy (2006) incorporates the whole myth cycle of the Trojan War and its aftermath, weaving together all the different strands of the story.

Elizabeth I (2011) focuses on the later years of Queen Elizabeth’s life, a period neglected by most popular novels, although it showcases the enigmatic queen's personality very strongly. It begins with the Spanish Armada in 1588 and ends with her death in 1603.

She has also co-authored an illustrated children's book about tortoises with Christopher Murphy, DVM, titled Lucille Lost (2006).

The Confessions of Young Nero (2017) and its continuation, The Splendor Before the Dark (2018) tell the story of the artist-emperor' brief but legendary life, from A.D. 37-68.

Margaret George’s knowledge of ancient medicine, acquired through her background in biology and her research on Cleopatra, Mary Magdalene, Helen of Troy, and Nero, has led to her speaking on the subject at various venues. Her favorite is discussing the chemistry of the fatal snakebite and Cleopatra, illustrating the erroneous depictions in film and paintings.

== Works ==
- The Autobiography of Henry VIII: With Notes by His Fool, Will Somers (1986)
- Mary Queen of Scotland and the Isles (1992)
- The Memoirs of Cleopatra (1997)
- Mary, Called Magdalene (2002)
- Helen of Troy (2006)
- Lucille Lost (2006)
- Elizabeth I (2011)
- The Confessions of Young Nero (2017)
- The Splendor Before the Dark (2018)
