= The Asset (Agents of S.H.I.E.L.D.) =

- Agents of S.H.I.E.L.D. episode
- Gravitonium, as seen in the episode's end tag, with visual effects by FuseFX.
- Episode no.: Season 1 Episode 3
- Directed by: Milan Cheylov
- Written by: Jed Whedon; Maurissa Tancharoen
- Cinematography by: Jeff Mygatt
- Editing by: Joshua Charson
- Original air date: October 8, 2013
- Running time: 44 minutes

Guest appearances
- David Conrad as Ian Quinn; Ian Hart as Franklin Hall

Episode chronology
← Previous "0-8-4"	Next → "Eye Spy"
- Agents of S.H.I.E.L.D. season 1

"The Asset" is the third episode of the first season of the American television series Agents of S.H.I.E.L.D. Based on the Marvel Comics organization S.H.I.E.L.D., it follows Phil Coulson and his team of S.H.I.E.L.D. agents as they investigate the kidnapping of Dr. Franklin Hall. It is set in the Marvel Cinematic Universe (MCU) and acknowledges the franchise's films. The episode was written by co-showrunners Jed Whedon and Maurissa Tancharoen, and directed by Milan Cheylov.

Clark Gregg reprises his role as Coulson from the film series, starring alongside Ming-Na Wen, Brett Dalton, Chloe Bennet, Iain De Caestecker, and Elizabeth Henstridge. The episode adapts the character of Hall from the comics, portrayed by guest star Ian Hart. It features Hall's gravitational technology, powered by the fictional element gravitonium that was created for the episode by visual effects vendor FuseFX. The episode also introduces David Conrad as recurring villain Ian Quinn, with his own villainous musical theme; a variation of this theme is played on ethnic instruments to support the episode's Malta setting.

"The Asset" originally aired on ABC on October 8, 2013, and was watched by 12.01 million viewers within a week. The episode received a mostly positive critical response, especially for Hart's portrayal of Hall, but the development of the main cast was seen to be lacking.

== Plot ==
Carrying a S.H.I.E.L.D. "asset" between classified bases, a convoy is attacked by a seemingly invisible force, with the vehicles being hurled impossibly into the air. Soldiers break into the main transport and find the asset, Dr. Franklin Hall. Aboard the Bus, the aerial headquarters for S.H.I.E.L.D. agent Phil Coulson and his team, Agent Grant Ward is struggling to supervise the training of the unmotivated civilian-recruit Skye. Learning of Hall's kidnapping, Coulson and his team investigate the convoy wreckage. Agents Leo Fitz and Jemma Simmons discover a device, fueled by the rare element gravitonium, that alters gravity fields. The team tracks down the former owner of an excavator used by the soldiers in the attack, and trace the gold bars he was paid with back to Ian Quinn, a wealthy industrialist and philanthropist.

Quinn holds an announcement of a large deposit of gravitonium in his possession, in his Malta mansion where S.H.I.E.L.D. has no jurisdiction. Skye uses her hacktivist background to gain entry to the announcement, and disables Quinn's outer defenses. Coulson and Ward are able to sneak into Quinn's mansion, where they find Hall free and well, and working on a large gravitonium generator that would allow Quinn to control the world's gravity. Hall reveals that he was working with Quinn all along, the two having attended college together where they had first designed the generator. However, Hall realized that he couldn't allow anyone to gain control of the generator's power, and so plans to let it destroy itself and Quinn's mansion. As this would kill the thousands of innocent people on the island, Coulson lets Hall fall into the gravitonium which catalyzes an anti-reaction to turn off the machine, apparently killing Hall in the process.

Quinn escapes custody while S.H.I.E.L.D. takes possession of the gravitonium. Skye finds the motivation to commit to her training, after she and Ward have a meaningful conversation about their "defining moments", and Agent Melinda May, who had previously avoided combat operations since retiring, decides she would rather be fully committed than watching helplessly from the Bus. In an end tag, Hall is shown to be still alive within the gravitonium, which is sealed in an unmarked vault by S.H.I.E.L.D.

== Production ==
=== Development ===
Marvel Television announced in September 2013 that the third episode of the series Agents of S.H.I.E.L.D. was titled "The Asset", and had been written by co-showrunners Jed Whedon and Maurissa Tancharoen, with Milan Cheylov directing.

=== Casting ===
Marvel confirmed that the episode would star main cast members Clark Gregg as Phil Coulson, Ming-Na Wen as Melinda May, Brett Dalton as Grant Ward, Chloe Bennet as Skye, Iain De Caestecker as Leo Fitz, and Elizabeth Henstridge as Jemma Simmons.

The guest cast for the episode includes David Conrad as Ian Quinn and Ian Hart as Franklin Hall. On adapting the character of Franklin Hall from the comics, co-showrunner Jeffrey Bell said the writers had written the role into the episode before deciding who the character would be. They then looked through the comics for an appropriate character, and adjusted the story to make it work for Hall once they had selected him. The episode is an origin story for the character, rather than depicting him as the fully formed supervillain from the comics. As a hint at his potential to become the villain "Graviton", the series changed his original scientific interests from matter transportation to the study of "gravitonium", a substance created for the series. The episode's ending, which sees Hall fall into some gravitonium, indicates that this is how he would gain his Graviton abilities in the series.

=== Filming and visual effects ===
Filming occurred from July 29 to August 18, 2013. The set for Hall's lab which is affected by the gravitonium was built on a giant gimbal so it could rotate 360°, with all the props and furniture secured to the set. FuseFX provided the episode's visual effects, including replacing the S.H.I.E.L.D. vehicles from the opening sequence with computer generated models to depict them defying gravity and being destroyed. FuseFX visual effects supervisor Kevin Lingenfelser explained that shots involving gravitonium were divided into two categories: shots where the gravitonium is "neutral" or "ball like", which were animated to make the element act like a fluid; and more aggressive shots where the gravitonium envelopes Hall, which mimicked the effects of gravity while Hall was being sucked in, with "more sentient and deliberate motion" animated around that. Hart was filmed at high speed for this sequence as he fell onto a greenscreen stunt pad. As he is falling, he is replaced by a digital double to allow the gravitonium to surround him.

=== Music ===
For "The Asset", composer Bear McCreary wrote a theme for Ian Quinn. A "bouncy and energetic" version of this was performed on a bouzouki by guitarist Ed Trybek to evoke the music of Malta, while a simplified orchestral version is used as the primary Quinn theme. McCreary stated that he does not "use it a lot, but it counts when I do. When he catches Skye in the hallways and steps forward menacingly, the low strings and woodwinds sneak in on this theme and underscore how dangerous he is."

== Release ==
=== Broadcast ===
"The Asset" was first aired in the United States on ABC on October 8, 2013. It was aired alongside the US broadcast in Canada on CTV, while it was first aired in the United Kingdom on Channel 4 on October 11, 2013. It premiered on the Seven Network in Australia on October 9, 2013.

=== Home media ===
The episode, along with the rest of Agents of S.H.I.E.L.D.'s first season, was released on Blu-ray and DVD on September 9, 2014. Bonus features include behind-the-scenes featurettes, audio commentary, deleted scenes, and a blooper reel. On November 20, 2014, the episode became available for streaming on Netflix. The episode, along with the rest of the series, was removed from Netflix on February 28, 2022, and later became available on Disney+ on March 16, 2022.

== Reception ==
=== Ratings ===
In the United States the episode received a 2.9/9 percent share among adults between the ages of 18 and 49, meaning that it was seen by 2.9 percent of all households, and 9 percent of all of those watching television at the time of the broadcast. It was watched by 7.87 million viewers. The Canadian broadcast gained 1.91 million viewers, the second highest for that day and the seventh highest for the week. The United Kingdom premiere had 2.37 million viewers and in Australia, the premiere had 1.9 million viewers, including 0.9 million timeshifted viewers. Within a week of its release, the episode was watched by 12.01 million U.S. viewers, above the season average of 8.31.

=== Critical response ===
Eric Goldman of IGN scored the episode 7.7 out of 10, praising the plot and the introduction of Franklin Hall (Graviton in the comics), but criticizing the amount of humor and MCU references. David Sims of The A.V. Club scored the episode a "B", calling it "the first episode to show some potential for originality around the corner". He praised the character development, specifically for Coulson and Skye, and the introduction of Hall, but criticized Quinn as "barely a step above a generic Miami Vice villain and whose motives would be totally uninteresting if they were ever made clear to us". He also found Dalton to be "the latest in a line of dull Whedon hunks with just a glimmer of personality." The Guardian's Graeme Virtue felt that "If Agents of S.H.I.E.L.D. hasn't been levitating your boat so far, this breezy episode probably didn't do that much to change your mind. If you're not in the mood, the endless quipping can seem exhausting, but at least there was some incremental character development." He had a special praise for the introduction of Hall, and felt that Hart's performance as the character topped Samuel L. Jackson's cameo from the previous episode.

Dan Casey at Nerdist found the adage "third time is the charm" to apply to the episode, feeling that "Rather than trying to figure out where it fits within Marvel's grander on-screen universe, S.H.I.E.L.D. is focusing its energy on developing the eponymous agents and giving us more backstory", and though he felt that "The show still needs to figure out its balance of seriousness and humor", he concluded that the "show just keeps getting better." James Hunt at Den of Geek felt that "There's a distinct feeling of treading water", finding the episodic plot to be "fairly by-the-numbers for a show that's supposed to be about the fantastic", and he was disappointed in "Graviton's non-appearance appearance", referring to the lack of Hall's comics' alter-ego. Marc Bernardin of The Hollywood Reporter praised the episode's opening sequence, but criticized the character Skye and the focus the episode put on her rather than Coulson. He also spoke unfavorably of Quinn, noting that Hall would likely return as a villain himself in the future, but "until then, S.H.I.E.L.D. needs to up its adversarial game". Jim Steranko, known for his work on Nick Fury, Agent of S.H.I.E.L.D., felt "the plot's twists and turns clicked, even though it's kind of embarrassing when the commercials are more engrossing than the show."
