= Jeffrey Donovan =

American actor (born 1968)

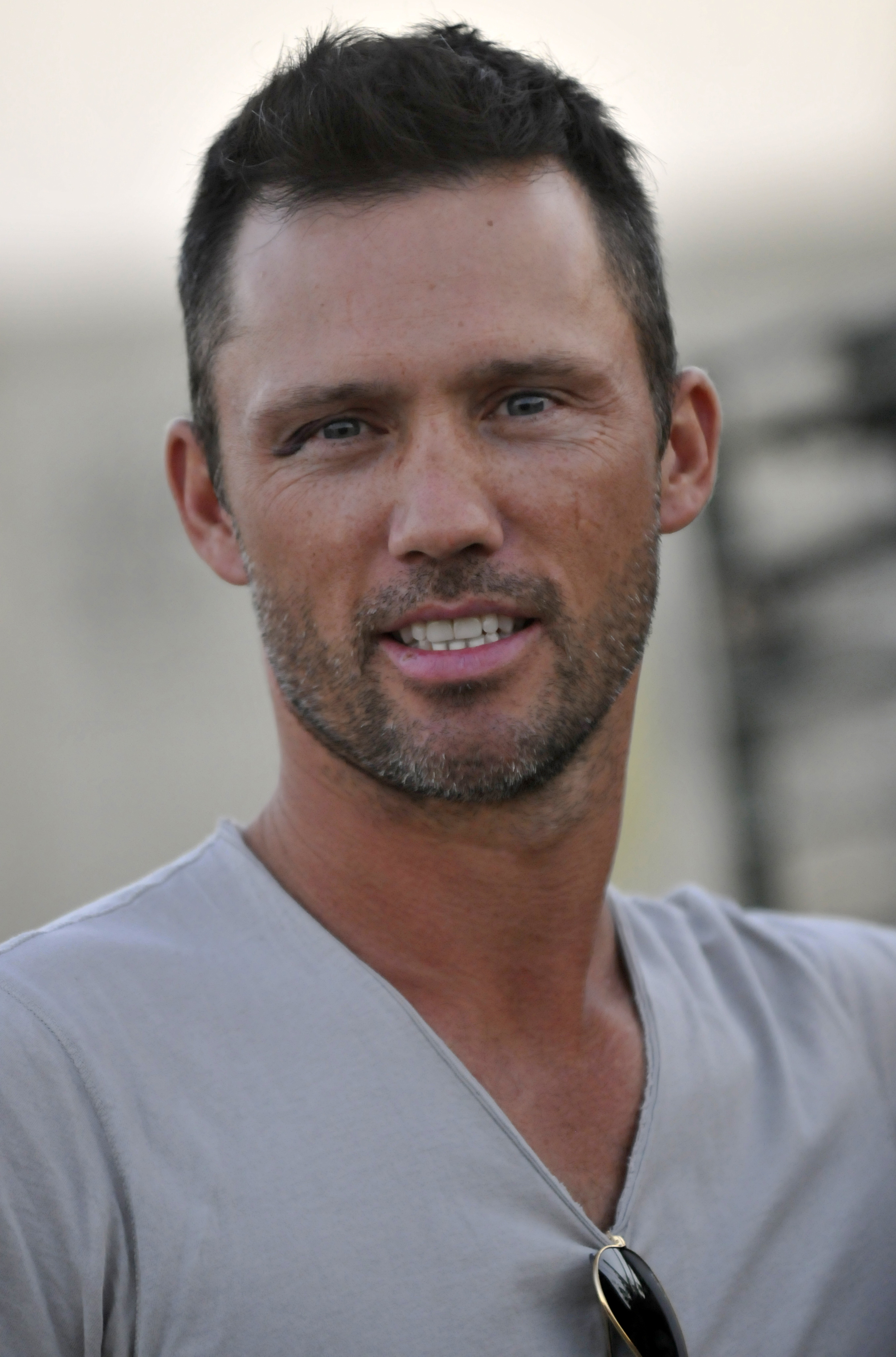
- Donovan in 2009
- Born: May 11, 1968 (age 58); Amesbury, Massachusetts, U.S.
- Education: Bridgewater State University; University of Massachusetts, Amherst (BA); New York University (MFA)
- Occupation: Actor
- Years active: 1995–present
- Spouse: Michelle Woods (m. 2012)
- Children: 3

Jeffrey Donovan (born May 11, 1968) is an American actor. He is best known for his role as Michael Westen in the television series Burn Notice, and has appeared in films such as Sicario and its sequel, Wrath of Man, Shot Caller, Hitch, Believe in Me, Changeling, and Come Early Morning. He played Robert F. Kennedy in Clint Eastwood's J. Edgar (2011) and his brother John F. Kennedy in Rob Reiner's LBJ (2016). He had a recurring role in the second season of the TV series Fargo (2015). In 2022–2023, he starred as NYPD Detective Frank Cosgrove on the revival of the NBC crime drama Law & Order.

== Early life ==
Donovan was born the middle of three boys to Nancy Matthews. Matthews was a single mother to Donovan, his older brother Michael and younger brother Sean, living on welfare after their father abandoned the family. They moved several times before settling in Amesbury, Massachusetts.

At Amesbury High School, Donovan was mentored by a teacher who helped him start a drama club and find a private scholarship, enabling him to participate in a summer program that helped him start his acting career. He attended Bridgewater State College before transferring to the University of Massachusetts Amherst, where he graduated with a Bachelor of Arts in drama.

While attending college, Donovan was a commercial bus driver at UMass Transit Service, where he operated passenger buses as part of the PVTA. He went on to earn his Master of Fine Arts from New York University's Graduate Acting Program at the Tisch School of the Arts.

== Career ==
=== Television ===
Donovan has guest-starred in several television shows, including CSI: Miami, Spin City, Monk, Millennium, Witchblade, The Pretender, Homicide: Life on the Street and Law & Order. In the short-lived TV series Threshold, Donovan played the antihero Dr. Sloan. Donovan also played the recurring role of William Ivers in Crossing Jordan. In 2004, he had his first leading role in the American remake of the British television series Touching Evil with Vera Farmiga on the USA Network.

From 2007 to 2013, Donovan starred in Burn Notice, as Michael Westen, a spy who was burned, for reasons unknown to him, and marooned in Miami, Florida. The show follows Westen as he attempts to find out why he was burned and regain his job as a covert intelligence agent, in addition to bringing justice to the people of Miami. Donovan made his directorial debut with the series' episode, "Made Man" which first aired on June 17, 2010. Donovan also directed a prequel film starring co-star Bruce Campbell, titled Burn Notice: The Fall of Sam Axe, which first aired on USA Network on April 17, 2011. The series lasted for seven seasons, received positive reviews from both fans and critics, and was nominated for four Primetime Emmy Awards.

In 2015, Donovan had a recurring role on Fargo as North Dakota mobster Dodd Gerhardt. In 2016, he began starring as Tarot-reading con artist Charlie Haverford in Shut Eye on Hulu. On January 30, 2018, Shut Eye was canceled after two seasons.

In 2021, he was cast as a series regular detective for the 21st season of Law & Order.

=== Theater ===
Donovan has also performed on stage in various productions, including Hamlet as the title character, A View from the Bridge as Marco, An Inspector Calls, and Off-Broadway in Things You Shouldn't Say Past Midnight as Gene, The Glory of Living as Clint, regionally in Toys in the Attic as Julian Berniers, On the Waterfront as Terry Malloy, Oedipus as Teiresias and Freedomland (play) as Seth. From October 2008 until spring 2009, he starred in the farce Don't Dress for Dinner in Chicago. Donovan has also performed in the radio dramas On the Waterfront (once again as Terry Malloy), Frozen, and Grapes of Wrath.

== Personal life ==
Donovan has over 20 years of martial arts experience. In college, he earned his black belt in Shotokan Karate and competed throughout the state. Later, he studied Aikido for over six years and Brazilian Jiu-jitsu.

On July 3, 2009, Donovan, a Boston Red Sox baseball fan since childhood, threw the ceremonial first pitch at the game between the Red Sox and the Seattle Mariners at Fenway Park. On July 3, 2010, he once again threw the ceremonial first pitch at Fenway Park, this time at a game between the Red Sox and the Baltimore Orioles.

Donovan married model and actress Michelle Woods in 2012. Their daughter, Claire, was born that same year. Their son Lucas was born in 2014 and they had a third child, another daughter, in 2017.

== Philanthropy ==
In 2009, Donovan returned to Amesbury High School where he took part in a career day mentorship program with other successful professionals and presented the school with a $100,000 arts scholarship program. The first $10,000 award was given out to a senior that June.

For many years, Donovan has actively supported Life Rolls On (LRO), a foundation empowering people with spinal cord injuries. On October 4, 2009, he served as one of the chairmen for the 6th Annual LRO annual fundraiser called Night by the Ocean at the Kodak Theatre. Donovan was named Grand Marshal of the 22nd annual AIDS Walk Miami held on April 17, 2010.

Donovan also supports his friends' charity events. In September 2009, while helping Michael Bolton at the 17th Annual Benefit Concert for Women and Children at Risk in Stamford, Connecticut, Donovan auctioned off a "Burn Notice walk-on part" plus a kiss. Walk-on parts usually raise $2,000–5,000. With the added kiss, he raised $36,000.

== Filmography ==
=== Film ===
Year	Title	Role	Notes
1995	Throwing Down	Pete Gulley	
1996	Sleepers	Henry Addison	
1996	Critical Choices	Randy	
1997	Vegas Vacation	Hotel employee	Uncredited
1997	Catherine's Grove	Thomas Mason	
1998	Witness to the Mob	Agent	
1998	When Trumpets Fade	Private Bobby Miller	
2000	Bait	Julio	
2000	Book of Shadows: Blair Witch 2	Jeffrey Patterson	
2001	Purpose	Robert Jennings	
2003	Final Draft	Pascal	
2004	Sam & Joe	Eric	
2005	Hitch	Vance Munson	
2006	Come Early Morning	Cal Percell	
2006	Believe in Me	Clay Driscoll	
2008	Hindsight	Paul	
2008	Changeling	Captain J.J. Jones	
2011	J. Edgar	Robert F. Kennedy	
2015	Sicario	Steve Forsing	
2015	Extinction	Jack	
2016	LBJ	John F. Kennedy	
2017	Shot Caller	Bottles	
2018	Sicario: Day of the Soldado	Steve Forsing	
2019	Extremely Wicked, Shockingly Evil and Vile	John O'Connell	
2019	Villains	George	
2019	Lucy in the Sky	Jim Hunt	
2019	Wonder Woman: Bloodlines	Steve Trevor	Voice role
2020	Honest Thief	Agent Sean Meyers	
2020	Let Him Go	Bill Weboy	
2021	Wrath of Man	Jackson	
2021	National Champions	Mark Titus	
2022	Breaking	Major Riddick	
2022	R.I.P.D. 2: Rise of the Damned	Sheriff Roy Pulsipher	
2022	First Love	Greg Albright	
2023	Surrounded	Wheeler	
2026	Wardriver	Bilson	
2026	The Cycle	Marks	
TBA	Eleven Days	TBA	Post-production

=== Television ===
Year	Title	Role	Notes
1995	Homicide: Life on the Street	Miles and Newton Dell	Episode: "Thrill of the Kill"
1995, 2007	Law & Order	Edward Nicodos / Jacob Reese	2 episodes
1997	Millennium	Bobby Webber	Episode: "The Wild and the Innocent"
1997	Another World	Dwayne 'Popper' Collins	1 episode
1997–1998	The Pretender	Kyle	S1/E21–22 "Dragon House: Part 1 & 2"; S2/E19 "Red Rock Jarod"
1999	Spin City	Tom	2 episodes
2000	The Beat	Brad Ulrich	Recurring role
2002	Witchblade	Daniel Germaine	Episode: "Lagrimas"
2004	Touching Evil	Detective Inspector Dave Creegan	Main role
2005	CSI: Miami	Todd Kendrick	2 episodes
2006	Threshold	Dr. Julian Sloan	Episode: "Vigilante"
2006	Monk	Steve Wagner	Episode: "Mr. Monk and the Astronaut"
2007	Crossing Jordan	William Ivers	5 episodes
2007–2013	Burn Notice	Michael Westen	Main role Also director (episodes: "Made Man", "Mixed Message", and "Forget Me Not")
2011	Burn Notice: The Fall of Sam Axe	Michael Westen	Television film, cameo, also director and executive producer
2015	Fargo	Dodd Gerhardt	Recurring role, 10 episodes
2016–2017	Shut Eye	Charlie Haverford	Main role
2021–2026	Invincible	Machine Head (voice)	3 episodes
2022–2023	Law & Order	Det. Frank Cosgrove	Main role (seasons 21–22)
2022	Law & Order: Special Victims Unit	Det. Frank Cosgrove	1 episode
2022	Law & Order: Organized Crime	Det. Frank Cosgrove	1 episode

== Awards and nominations ==
Year	Award/Festival	Category	Nominated work	Result
2003	Method Fest Independent Film Festival	Best Supporting Actor	Sam & Joe	Won
2010–2011	Teen Choice Awards	Choice TV Actor: Action	Burn Notice	Nominated
