= Paul Holahan =

American film director

- Occupations: Director, cinematographer, producer and photographer
- Years active: 1987–present

Paul Holahan is an American film, television director, cinematographer, producer and photographer.

== Career ==
He has directed episodes of Witchblade, Numb3rs, Las Vegas, Shark, Ugly Betty, Burn Notice, The Mentalist, Wedding Band, GCB, Castle, Revenge, Body of Proof, Rizzoli and Isles, The Man in the High Castle, Fringe and The Blacklist, as well as producing and directing episodes of Without a Trace, The Ex List and Fairly Legal. In 2007, he directed the independent film Hindsight. He has also directed the Body of Proof episode "Hunting Party".

Holahan has also worked as a cinematographer for a number of short films, as well as directing and photographing music videos for country singers Jeffrey Steele and Shana.
