= Dallas season 9 =

Dallas
- Season 9
- DVD cover
- No. of episodes: 31

Release
- Original network: CBS
- Original release: September 27, 1985 – May 16, 1986

Season chronology
- ← Previous; Season 8 Next → Season 10

The ninth season of the television series Dallas aired on CBS during the 1985–86 TV season. As the entire season was annulled as a dream of the character Pamela Barnes Ewing (Victoria Principal) in the season 10 premiere, it has since been referred to as the "Dream Year" or the "Dream Season".

== Cast ==
=== Starring ===
In alphabetical order:

- Barbara Bel Geddes as Miss Ellie Ewing Farlow (31 episodes)
- Linda Gray as Sue Ellen Ewing (31 episodes)
- Larry Hagman as J. R. Ewing (31 episodes)
- Susan Howard as Donna Culver Krebbs (31 episodes)
- Steve Kanaly as Ray Krebbs (31 episodes)
- Howard Keel as Clayton Farlow (28 episodes)
- Ken Kercheval as Cliff Barnes (31 episodes)
- Priscilla Beaulieu Presley as Jenna Wade (29 episodes)
- Victoria Principal as Pamela Barnes Ewing (30 episodes)

=== Also starring ===
- Jenilee Harrison as Jamie Ewing Barnes (30 episodes)
- Dack Rambo as Jack Ewing (31 episodes)
- John Beck as Mark Graison (28 episodes), billed under "Guest Star" status for his first appearance
- Deborah Shelton as Mandy Winger (21 episodes)
- Marc Singer as Matt Cantrell (12 episodes)
- Jared Martin as Steven "Dusty" Farlow (11 episodes)
- Steve Forrest as Ben Stivers (3 episodes)

=== Special guest stars ===
- Barbara Carrera as Angelica Nero (25 episodes)
- Martha Scott as Patricia Shepard (7 episodes)
- William Prince as Alex Garrett (5 episodes)
- Ted Shackelford as Gary Ewing (1 episode)
- Patrick Duffy as Bobby Ewing (1 episode)

=== Notable guest stars ===
William Smithers (Jeremy Wendell) continues to appear, and Joshua Harris takes on the role as Christopher Ewing. Merete Van Kamp (Grace) and George Chakiris (Nicholas) appear in a major story arc, as does Solomon Smaniotto (Tony Krebbs), but none of them will return beyond the season.

== Crew ==
After years of only minor changes in the creative staff of the series, the ninth season sees several overhauls: while Philip Capice and Cliff Fenneman remain executive producer and associate producer respectively, James H. Brown replaces Leonard Katzman as producer, who is now the program's creative consultant. Peter Dunne as supervising producer replaces Katzman as showrunner, while Joel J. Feigenbaum as executive story consultant replaces David Paulsen, and Hollace White and Stephanie Garman join as story editors.

Among the three main writers for the two previous seasons, only Leonard Katzman returns for season nine. Other writers for the season are Peter Dunne (who had written two season eight episodes), Will Lorin (who had worked on the show during seasons five and six), and newcomers Joel J. Feigenbaum, Hollace White, Stephanie Garmin, Deanne Barkley, Bill Taub, and series star Susan Howard (Donna).

== DVD release ==
Season nine of Dallas' was released by Warner Bros. Home Video, on a Region 1 DVD box set of four double-sided DVDs, on July 15, 2008. In addition to the 31 episodes, it also includes the featurette "Seasons of Change".

== Dallas: The Early Years ==
On March 23, 1986, between the 26th and the 27th episode of the season, CBS aired the three-hour-long telefilm prequel Dallas: The Early Years, the only Dallas movie made during the series' original run. Written by series creator David Jacobs, the film was introduced by Larry Hagman as his character J.R., and starred David Marshall Grant, Dale Midkiff, and Molly Hagan as Digger Barnes, Jock Ewing, and Ellie Southworth, respectively. Taking place from 1933 to 1951, the film dealt with the creation of Ewing Oil and the origins of the Barnes-Ewing feud.

== Episodes ==
No. overall	No. in season	Title	Directed by	Written by	Original U.S. air date	Original U.K. air date	Prod. code	Rating/share (households)
192	1	"The Family Ewing"	Nick Havinga	Leonard Katzman	September 27, 1985	March 5, 1986	174101	23.9/38
The Ewings gather at Southfork to mourn Bobby. Cliff and Jamie try to comfort Pam, who blames herself for Bobby's death and frets one day Christopher will blame her as well. Miss Ellie decides to bury Bobby on a beautiful green hill overlooking Southfork near a tree house Jock built for him. Gary returns to Southfork and provides a shoulder for Ellie to lean on. Sue Ellen goes on a bender after J.R. insults her for not being there when Bobby said goodbye to everyone on his deathbed. Dusty wants to take care of Sue Ellen, and J.R. seems more than happy to get Sue Ellen out of his life. Pam tries her best to explain what happened to Christopher, as J.R. does to John Ross as well. Ellie tries to explain to Sue Ellen that she is an alcoholic, and that Dusty cannot offer her the kind of help she needs. Dusty, however, takes extraordinary measures to stop one of her binges. Bobby’s funeral is a small family event. Most of the family members move away and return to the house, leaving J.R. alone with the casket to say a personal and emotional final goodbye to his brother. NOTE: In February 1985 in the UK, the BBC pulled their broadcasts of season 8 episodes due to Thames Television of ITV having bought the rights for season 9 by outbidding the BBC. The BBC then threatened to broadcast the remaining 16 episodes of season 8 directly up against ITV's season 9 episode transmissions. The controversy resulted in many questions being asked about the issue in the British parliament. The BBC eventually relented and resumed their transmission of the remaining season 8 episodes after seven weeks off the air. Ultimately, numerous other ITV franchises, particularly Granada Television and Yorkshire Television were not happy with the deal, and thus complained to the regulatory Independent Broadcasting Authority. This eventually resulted in Thames Television backing down on their plans, and compelled to sell (season nine, the dream season) back to the BBC, at a financial loss. Dallas continued to be broadcast on the BBC, being shown on BBC1 until the end of the series run in 1991. The controversy was the main reason for the BBC transmissions of season 9 episodes in the UK being many months further behind the US broadcasts on CBS than usual.
193	2	"Rock Bottom"	Michael Preece	Joel J. Feigenbaum	September 27, 1985	March 5, 1986	174102	23.9/38
Sue Ellen has a sudden change of heart about leaving Southfork when she leaves Bobby‘s funeral. She tells Dusty it was a mistake for her to walk out and that she plans to go back. J.R. is not impressed with her return and his harsh rejection turns her, once again, to alcohol. Bobby’s will is read to the family and it is discovered that he left his share of Ewing Oil to Christopher, in Pam’s trust. J.R. can’t believe he may have to be in partnership with Pam, while Cliff wants nothing more than to arrange for Pam to sell the shares to him. While in a bar, a drunk Sue Ellen attracts a man who volunteers to take her home and then robs her of her Mercedes. The next morning, without her purse, identification, or any sense of herself, Sue Ellen wanders through an unfamiliar part of town. A bag lady offers her a drink, but Sue Ellen disdainfully rejects the offer. Mandy worries about the fact that J.R. is still a married man. Clayton and Ellie fear about Sue Ellen and go off to look for her. Sue Ellen returns to the bag lady she once shunned and now greedily shares her bottle of cheap wine.
194	3	"Those Eyes"	Nick Havinga	Peter Dunne	October 4, 1985	March 12, 1986	174103	23.8/37
Clayton and Miss Ellie intensify their search for Sue Ellen, who Ellie feels very strongly must be in trouble. J.R. tries to buy Christopher’s Ewing Oil shares while Jeremy Wendell of Weststar Oil works with Cliff to convince Pam to sell her Ewing Oil shares to them. Pam is truly torn between wanting to do the right thing for Christopher and wondering what Bobby would want her to do. Clayton and Ellie finally find Sue Ellen. She has been moved from the city drunk tank to a detoxification ward. Dusty comes to the detox ward and gives Sue Ellen some gentle assurance. J.R. arrives and he and Dusty exchange punches while Sue Ellen, traumatized, begins to scream and quake all over. Miss Ellie convinces J.R. to commit Sue Ellen to a sanitarium.
195	4	"Resurrection"	Michael Preece	Hollace White & Stephanie Garman	October 11, 1985	March 19, 1986	174104	21.8/36
Miss Ellie begins to wonder if she too should sell her shares of Ewing Oil to Weststar. Although she doesn’t want the family business to come to an end, she also does not want a repeat of the struggle for control that tore Bobby and J.R. apart after Jock’s death. Sue Ellen discovers that she has no choice but to join an alcoholics program at the clinic. Dusty bribes an attendant at the clinic Sue Ellen is in to let him see her. Clayton warns Dusty that his involvement with Sue Ellen is poorly timed, but Dusty seems very determined to make it work out this time. Sue Ellen is tempted when an attendant at the clinic offers her a drink, for a price. Although she is tempted, she ferociously rings for someone to come help her. Cliff continues to pressure Pam to sell to Wendell. Unable to deal with the business or the decisions she needs to make, Pam runs from the house and gets quite a shock when she runs into Mark Graison.
196	5	"Saving Grace"	Nick Havinga	Joel J. Feigenbaum	October 18, 1985	March 26, 1986	174105	22.3/36
Pam is stunned at seeing Mark. Mark tells Pam that there's no cure for his blood disease, but he's in remission. He tells her that he staged his death in order to spare her and search for a cure. J.R. is annoyed when his private investigator doesn't find any dirt on Jack so he instructs the detective to investigate Wendell. Cliff gets two weeks to firm up Jack and Pam's commitments to sell Ewing Oil shares to Wendell. Sue Ellen gets a stark report on her future and she decides to commit totally to rehab. Mandy listens to a seductive message J.R. leaves on her phone, but tells herself she can't pick up where they left off. Cliff and Jamie are stunned when Pam stops by with Mark. Ray cautions Jack not to trust J.R.. Ellie asks Dusty to stay away from Sue Ellen until she's recovered. Sue Ellen vows to beat her addiction, even when she learns that J.R. refuses to help her. Jack is awakened by an intruder who steals his passport. Mark attacks J.R. after he discovers J.R. sent Pam on a wild goose chase looking for him, and vows to ruin Ewing Oil.
197	6	"Mothers"	Michael Preece	Hollace White & Stephanie Garman	October 25, 1985	April 2, 1986	174106	22.7/37
J.R. nominates Bobby for the man of the year award at the Oil Baron's Ball. Cliff learns of the break-in at Jack's and wonders what he has to hide. Dusty tells Clayton and Ellie that he's going to Cheyenne for his divorce hearing but plans to come back for Sue Ellen. Mark explains to Kenderson that he decided to reenter Pam's life because she was in trouble. He says he has been honest with her about his condition. Kenderson agrees to head a blood disease research center that Mark wants to found. Sue Ellen discusses her parents and J.R. with her therapist who wants her to concentrate on the future. Sue Ellen's mother arrives for a short stay at Southfork. Ellie tells Clayton that Patricia has never been anything but trouble for Sue Ellen and everybody else. Sue Ellen takes pleasure in helping a fellow patient. Mark agrees to meet with Wendell to discuss his offer. An unseen photographer takes pictures of Jenna, Charlie and Jack then Jack by himself. Ellie advises Ray to make his own decision about selling his shares. Jack tells Ray he's attracted to Jenna but Ray warns it will take her a while to get over Bobby. Ray also reminds Jack that their third option with the sale is to simply side with whatever Miss Ellie decides to do. Patricia tells Sue Ellen she plans to stay in Dallas to help Sue Ellen regain her life. J.R. finds out that Mandy moved out of her apartment. Pam explains to J.R. that she decided to take Wendell's offer because it seems the better long-term interest for Christopher. J.R. feels utterly defeated. Ellie tells Clayton she's decided to sell to Wendell. Ellie goes to Ewing Oil and hears J.R. talking aloud to Bobby. She's disturbed to hear him say he's taking John Ross and leaving Dallas.
198	7	"The Wind of Change"	Corey Allen	Peter Dunne	November 1, 1985	April 9, 1986	174107	23.5/38
Miss Ellie and Pam make their final decisions on the Weststar offer; Donna and Ray get bad news about her pregnancy; Sue Ellen continues to progress in her recovery; Jack woos Jenna further; Mandy shows up at the Oil Baron's Ball
199	8	"Quandary"	Michael Preece	Joel J. Feigenbaum	November 8, 1985	April 16, 1986	174108	22.7/36
Ray and Donna investigate options to deal with their baby's condition; Dusty claims he's staying in Dallas; J.R. immediately seeks to find a way to rid himself of Pam; Cliff wants Jamie back; Angelica Nero wines and dines the town's oilmen.
200	9	"Close Encounters"	Corey Allen	Hollace White & Stephanie Garman	November 15, 1985	April 23, 1986	174109	23.1/35
Angelica attends a Southfork Rodeo; Sue Ellen's mother warns her away from Dusty; J.R. offers Jack a job at Ewing Oil. Donna is rushed to the hospital, with her and the baby's life at risk.
201	10	"Suffer the Little Children"	Michael Preece	Leonard Katzman	November 22, 1985	April 30, 1986	174110	22.0/33
Cliff tries to repair his relationships with Jamie and Pam; Sue Ellen renews the custody battle with J.R., who's busy discovering Angelica's past.
202	11	"The Prize"	Corey Allen	Hollace White & Stephanie Garman	November 29, 1985	May 7, 1986	174111	21.4/34
John Ross runs away as the custody fight comes to a close; Angelica tries to rush her deal with Ewing Oil, while J.R. continues to investigate her motives.
203	12	"En Passant"	Michael Preece	Peter Dunne & Joel J. Feigenbaum	December 6, 1985	May 14, 1986	174112	22.0/35
J.R. appeals his loss of John Ross' custody; Donna and Ray deal with the loss of their baby in very different ways; J.R.'s kidnapped detective is used by Angelica and Nicholas to further the Marinos venture; Sue Ellen and her mother argue over her future.
204	13	"Goodbye, Farewell, and Amen"	Linda Day	Will Lorin	December 13, 1985	May 21, 1986	174113	22.6/35
J.R. hopes to trick Sue Ellen into giving up custody; Jenna breaks things off with Jack; Pam wants to vacation with Mark; Clayton makes a deal without Miss Ellie's knowledge.
205	14	"Curiosity Killed the Cat"	Larry Hagman	Deanne Barkley	December 20, 1985	May 28, 1986	174114	21.1/35
Clayton shields Miss Ellie from his financial pinch; Ray and Donna move into Southfork; Cliff tries to tell Mandy that J.R. doesn't care about her; Jack goes missing.
206	15	"The Missing Link"	Linda Day	Bill Taub	January 3, 1986	June 11, 1986	174115	21.9/33
Pam seeks answers about the emerald from Matt Cantrell; Mandy double-crosses J.R.; Jack is still missing, and his presence is needed more than ever; Sue Ellen starts working.
207	16	"Twenty-Four Hours"	Robert Becker	Hollace White & Stephanie Garman	January 10, 1986	June 25, 1986	174116	22.1/34
The search for Jack takes new urgency as Jamie lies near death; Donna starts working with those suffering from Down Syndrome; Angelica reveals why Jack is so important to her; Pam seeks a way to work with Mark.
208	17	"The Deadly Game"	Larry Hagman	Bill Taub	January 17, 1986	July 2, 1986	174117	23.2/36
Jamie slowly recovers at the hospital; J.R. recruits Marilee Stone into the Marinos deal; Clayton's problems ease, not knowing Miss Ellie is the source; Pam arranges for a visit to Mark's Colombian emerald mine.
209	18	"Blame It on Bogota"	Robert Becker	Peter Dunne	January 24, 1986	July 9, 1986	174118	22.0/34
J.R. and Cantrell continue their plot to set up Pam; Angelica grows unhappy over the profit-sharing arrangement from the Marinos deal; Mark feels he and Pam may not have a future.
210	19	"Shadow Games"	Roy Campanella II	Joel J. Feigenbaum	January 31, 1986	July 16, 1986	174119	20.9/33
Pam and Matt get to Colombia; Sue Ellen's newfound stability makes J.R. reevaluate her; Clayton finds out Miss Ellie bailed him out; Donna confides to Miss Ellie that her baby would've been born with mental retardation; Jenna becomes increasingly despondent over Bobby's death.
211	20	"Missing"	Michael A. Hoey	Leonard Katzman	February 7, 1986	July 23, 1986	174120	22.2/34
J.R. and local authorities try to locate Pam, who has disappeared in Colombia; Jack succumbs to Grace's wiles; Mandy stops working for Cliff.
212	21	"Dire Straits"	Bruce Bilson	Joel J. Feigenbaum & Peter Dunne	February 14, 1986	July 30, 1986	174121	21.0/32
Mark and Cliff work to secure Pam's release; Jenna sinks deeper into depression; Donna grows close to a child with mental retardation; J.R. thinks he understands Dimitri; Mandy confesses her treachery.
213	22	"Overture"	Corey Allen	Hollace White & Stephanie Garman	February 21, 1986	August 6, 1986	174122	20.8/32
J.R. shows an increasingly active interest in reconciling with Sue Ellen; Jenna begins to realize she can't deal with her grief over Bobby alone; Pam wants to explore the emerald mine; Ray takes interest in a deaf foster child named Tony.
214	23	"Sitting Ducks"	Linda Day	Susan Howard	February 28, 1986	August 13, 1986	174123	20.6/34
J.R. grows more suspicious of Angelica and the Marinos deal; Pam must defend her job at Ewing Oil; Lucy's wedding rattles Jenna; Ray continues to grow fond of an orphaned deaf boy.
215	24	"Masquerade"	Larry Hagman	Leonard Katzman	March 7, 1986	August 20, 1986	174124	20.9/33
J.R. and Jack are unaware of the danger they're in at the Martinique conference; Pam questions her role at Ewing Oil; Jenna nears a total mental breakdown.
216	25	"Just Desserts"	Linda Gray	Peter Dunne & Joel J. Feigenbaum	March 14, 1986	August 27, 1986	174125	19.9/31
Angelica disappears in the aftermath of the assassination attempt; Jenna plans to leave Dallas; Ray talks to Donna about adopting; Pam makes a decision regarding her employment at Ewing Oil.
217	26	"Nothing's Ever Perfect"	Bruce Bilson	Leonard Katzman	March 21, 1986	September 3, 1986	174126	19.4/32
Having regained control of Ewing Oil, J.R. sets his sights firmly on Sue Ellen; Ray and Donna start adoption procedures; Angelica plots revenge; Jenna second-guesses leaving Southfork.
218	27	"J.R. Rising"	Linda Day	Joel J. Feigenbaum & Peter Dunne	April 4, 1986	September 10, 1986	174127	19.8/32
J.R. tries to get a bigger piece of the Marinos deal; Ray's manslaughter conviction hampers the adoption proceedings; Matt makes an emerald strike; Angelica comes back to the United States.
219	28	"Serendipity"	Bruce Bilson	Leonard Katzman	April 11, 1986	September 17, 1986	174128	20.0/33
Cliff thinks J.R.'s set him and the cartel up for failure in the Marinos deal; Donna and Ray work on Tony's reluctance to be adopted; Jamie fears a new Barnes/Ewing feud is brewing; Angelica makes a beeline for Dallas.
220	29	"Thrice in a Lifetime"	Jerry Jameson	Joel J. Feigenbaum & Peter Dunne	May 2, 1986	September 24, 1986	174129	19.7/34
The cartel is ready to join Cliff to battle J.R.; Pam and Mark make wedding preparations; Angelica moves forward with her revenge scheme; the Krebbs meet more obstacles in their quest to adopt Tony.
221	30	"Hello, Goodbye, Hello"	Nick Havinga	Leonard Katzman	May 9, 1986	October 1, 1986	174130	18.6/32
New ranch hand Ben Stivers prompts suspicion from Clayton and Punk; J.R. gets valuable information against Mark Graison, but finds Ewing Oil in danger; Ray and Donna get a hearing in their adoption case; Angelica gets closer to her revenge.
222	31	"Blast from the Past"	Michael Preece	Joel J. Feigenbaum & Peter Dunne	May 16, 1986	October 8, 1986	174131	24.9/42
J.R. pledges himself anew to Sue Ellen; Angelica brings her revenge plot to fruition; Ray and Donna learn they are allowed to adopt Tony; Pam and Mark are married, but she awakens to a surprise in her shower. Note: All events in these season 9 episodes, plus the events of the latter part of the season 8 finale, are a dream by Pam, so thus all the events in this season did not actually happen in the Dallas universe. This episode also carries the strange and obvious credit “Starring Patrick Duffy as...” (with the space under where his character name might have been seen left blank for purposes of the cliffhanger). For its twist, the episode was ranked as #4 as part of the "Top 100 Most Unexpected Moments in TV History" by TV Guide and TV Land.
