= Who Done It (Dallas) =

- Dallas episode
- Episode no.: Season 4 Episode 4
- Directed by: Leonard Katzman
- Written by: Loraine Despres
- Production code: 58
- Original air date: November 21, 1980

Guest appearances
- Mary Crosby as Kristin Shepard; Susan Howard as Donna Culver; Leigh McCloskey as Mitch Cooper; John Lehne as Kyle Bennett; Laurence Haddon as Franklin Horner; Gregory Walcott as Jim Redfield; Jeff Cooper as Dr. Simon Elby; Tom Fuccello as Dave Culver; Nik Hagler as Detective Frost; Lee Holmes as Doctor; Ken Farmer as Gil; Debra Stricklin; Tim Lonsdale as Cab Driver; Toni Garret; Tyler Banks as John Ross Ewing III

Episode chronology
← Previous "Nightmare"	Next → "Taste of Success"
- Dallas (1978 TV series, season 4)

"Who Done It" is the fourth episode of the fourth season of the American television series Dallas, and the 58th episode overall. It first aired on CBS in the United States on November 21, 1980. The episode was written by Loraine Despres, and revealed who had shot J. R. Ewing (played by Larry Hagman) in the third season finale "A House Divided". The perpetrator's fate was revealed in the subsequent episode one week later.

== Overview ==
For an eight-month-long period of media frenzy after the broadcast of "A House Divided" episode (wherein Dallas archvillain J.R. Ewing was shot by an unidentified perpetrator outside his office), oddsmakers created a set of odds for the possible culprits. The favorite was Dusty Farlow, who was Sue Ellen Ewing's lover (Sue Ellen being J.R.'s wife), with odds installed at 6:4. Sue Ellen herself was given 25:1 odds, as was J.R.'s mother Miss Ellie Ewing. At 4:1 were Sue Ellen's sister and her husband's mistress, Kristin Shepard and banker Vaughn Leland, who fell victim to a J.R. swindle. After Sue Ellen's fingerprints were found on the gun in subsequent episodes she became the favorite at 3 to 1 according to some oddsmakers, while others listed Kristin and Cliff Barnes as favorites (Cliff being J.R.'s rival from childhood).

J.R. Ewing is a fictional character that William K. Stevens of The New York Times described as "the nastiest man on television, the Iago of Texas oilmen, the smiling snake of a star of Friday night TV's Dallas, a man so venal, so low, so mean, so diabolical that he has become an absolute delight to an estimated quarter of a billion viewers around the globe." His New York Times colleague John J. O'Connor described him as "the eldest son of the oil-rich Ewing family..." who is "...a sadistic bully and a swindler" that "captured the public's imagination". Prior to the episode, there were numerous people to suspect for the attempted murder:

- Sue Ellen Ewing (Linda Gray), J.R.'s wife: J.R. had threatened to reinstitutionalize her for her bout with alcoholism.
- Kristin Shepard (Mary Crosby), J.R.'s ex-mistress and Sue Ellen's sister: J.R. broke his promise to marry her and gave her 24 hours to leave town. J.R. threatened to have her framed for prostitution in response to business pressure she put on him.
- Dusty Farlow (Jared Martin), Sue Ellen's lover: Supposedly killed in a plane crash.
- Vaughn Leland (Dennis Patrick), J.R.'s business partner: J.R. swindled him out of $20 million (US$78 million in 2025 dollars).
- Miss Ellie Ewing (Barbara Bel Geddes), J.R.'s mother: J.R. mortgaged the family ranch, unbeknownst to his parents, and had plans to drill for oil on the property.
- Cliff Barnes (Ken Kercheval), J.R.'s brother-in-law (through his sister's marriage to Bobby Ewing) and business rival: His father Digger Barnes was swindled by J.R.'s father Jock Ewing out of his half of their combined oil company (Digger's side of the story; Jock claimed he had kept the company in his name due to Digger's recklessness), leaving him penniless except for some oil wells that J.R. had shut down.
- Alan Beam (Randolph Powell), Political fixer: Beam knew too much, making him expendable. After J.R. tried to extinguish him, he had motive.
- Marilee Stone (Fern Fitzgerald), widow of a business associate: Husband committed suicide as a result of business dealings with J.R.
- Bobby Ewing (Patrick Duffy), mild-mannered brother: Sibling rival, who is fed up with J.R.'s handling of family business and slights to Bobby's wife.

Although generally regarded as somewhat rivals of J.R. in the fictional world of Dallas, Gary Ewing (Ted Shackelford) and his wife Valene (Joan Van Ark) were not suspects due to their activity in the related Knots Landing world. Similarly, their daughter Lucy (Charlene Tilton) had an alibi provided by liaisons with a married college professor.

In order to preserve secrecy before the episode aired, multiple endings were filmed, including every actor and crew member—even J.R. (Larry Hagman) himself—each firing the gun.

== Plot summary ==
After a considerable number of suspects have been identified, Sue Ellen deduces that it was Kristin who shot J.R. At her psychiatrist's office, as she is discussing the gun and how it made its way to her bedroom, she remembers that the last time it was in her possession was when she was at Kristin's condo. She finds J.R. at home, when Kristin shows up and Sue Ellen reveals all.

When Sue Ellen earlier showed up at her sister's apartment with the gun (looking for J.R.), Kristin calmly offered her a drink, with the knowledge that she was drunk and would most likely pass out. Once that happened, after placing Sue Ellen back in her car, unconscious, Kristin took the gun and shot J.R. and planted the gun in Sue Ellen's closet the next day in order to frame her.

After J.R. hears everything and is about to notify the police, Kristin reveals she is pregnant with J.R.'s baby and threatens to reveal everything if the police are brought in. Facing the prospect of another scandal should his child be born in prison, J.R. decides the matter should be handled quietly.

== Broadcast and reception ==
'"Who Done It'" resolved the "Who shot J.R.?" cliffhanger from the previous season, entitled "A House Divided". Some suggest that the resolution of the whodunit was delayed until the November "sweep" period as a ratings ploy by network CBS for the 1980–81 television season. Between 83 million and 90 million American viewers (or 76% of all U.S. television viewers in November 1980) watched the episode; the 53.3 Nielsen rating was the highest rating of any television episode in U.S. history, a record broken in February 1983 when the final episode of M*A*S*H aired (on the same network). "Who Done It" still attained the second highest Nielsen rating for a single television broadcast in U.S. history, and remains second on the list of all-time most watched U.S. television episodes (behind the 1983 M.A.S.H. final episode).

Dallas went on to finish at #1 in the Nielsen ratings for three of the next four seasons as a result of the publicity this episode generated, although since the final episode of M.A.S.H. in 1983, the resolution episode of Dallas 1980 cliffhanger fell into the second most internationally watched single U.S. television episode in history (watched by about 98 million international viewers in more than 8 countries worldwide during the November 1980 broadcast). The episode also marked the start of widespread usage of cliffhangers as a core element of television season finales in the United States since the 1980s, and also remained as the highest rated Friday primetime broadcast in U.S. television history (at the time when Friday nights experienced a steep decline in viewership by the end of the 20th century).
