= Dallas: The Early Years =

1986 American drama TV film

- Genre: Drama
- Based on: Dallas by David Jacobs
- Written by: David Jacobs
- Directed by: Larry Elikann
- Starring: David Grant; Dale Midkiff; Molly Hagan; David Wilson; Hoyt Axton; Larry Hagman
- Theme music composer: Jerrold Immel
- Country of origin: United States
- Original language: English

Production
- Executive producers: David Jacobs; Malcolm Stuart
- Producer: Joseph B. Wallenstein
- Production locations: Fort Worth; Texas State Railroad, Rusk, Texas; Cloyce Box Ranch - 10514 E. Main St., Frisco, Texas; Dallas; Parker, Texas; Plano, Texas
- Cinematography: Neil Roach
- Editor: Harry Kaye
- Running time: 140 minutes
- Production companies: Lorimar Television; Roundelay Productions

Original release
- Network: CBS
- Release: March 23, 1986

Related
- Dallas

Dallas: The Early Years is a 1986 American made-for-television drama film and a prequel to the television series Dallas. The film aired on CBS on March 23, 1986 between the 26th and 27th episodes of the 1985–1986 ninth season of Dallas. The film is the first installment of the Dallas film series.

== Plot ==
Written by series creator David Jacobs, the movie chronicles the exploits of Jock Ewing, Ellie Southworth, and Willard "Digger" Barnes from 1933 to 1951 and firmly established the background story of Dallas and how the long and ongoing feud between Jock and Digger started. Larry Hagman also appears in the opening sequence as his character, J.R. Ewing, being interviewed by a reporter who is researching the Barnes – Ewing feud.

While focusing on the triangle of Jock – Ellie – Digger, the movie also features Jock's brother, Jason, and Miss Ellie's father, Aaron, as starring characters. It shows the origins of the Ewing Oil, and Jock's schemings to make it big, and it deals with the inter-family relations of the Ewings, the Barnes, and the Southworths. It also shows Jock's first marriage to Amanda Lewis, and Ellie's relationship with her mother, Barbara, and brother, Garrison.

== Cast ==
Starring

- David Grant as Willard "Digger" Barnes
- Dale Midkiff as Jock Ewing
- Molly Hagan as Ellie Southworth Ewing
- David Wilson as Jason Ewing, Jock's older brother
- Hoyt Axton as Aaron Southworth, Miss Ellie's father

Introduced by

- Larry Hagman as J. R. Ewing

Also starring

- Bill Duke as Seth Foster
- Geoffrey Lewis as Ed Porter

Guest starring

- Diane Franklin as Amanda Lewis Ewing, Jock's first wife
- Marshall Thompson as Dr. Ted Johnson
- William Frankfather as Newman
- Wendel Meldrum as Honey
- Joe Rainer as Sam Culver
- Marjie Rynearson as Barbara Southworth, Miss Ellie's mother
- Liz Keifer as Cherie Simmons
- Matt Mulhern as Garrison Southworth, Miss Ellie's brother
- Davis Roberts as the Preacher
- Kevin Wixted as young J. R.

Co-starring

- Joe Berryman as Roscoe
- Angie Bolling as Deborah Culver
- Blue Deckert as Card Player
- Cynthia Dorn as Jeanne
- Bob Hannah as the Sheriff
- Norma Moore as Maggie Barnes, Digger's sister
- Karen Radcliffe as the Hooker
- Terrence Riggins as Benjamin Foster
- Norma Allen as Townswoman
- Jesse Baca as Driver
- Ryan Beadle as young Bobby Ewing
- Frank Bell as Sharecropper
- Terry Evans as Young Man
- Johnny Felder as young Cliff Barnes
- Lee Gideon as Haskins
- Max Harvey as Farmer
- Rhashell Hunter as Priscilla Foster
- Joyce Ingle as Townswoman
- George Leverett as Square Dance Caller
- Bennie Moore as young Benjamin Foster
- Tony Morris as Ranch Hand
- Chuck Page as Townsman
- Peyton Park as the Justice
- Jim Ponds as Farmer
- Ray Redd as Townsman
- Debra Lynn Rogeras as Joanne Haskins
- Rose Mari Roundtree as Girlfriend
- Mike Shanks as Hobo
- Gena Sleete as Townswoman
- Louanne Stephens as Woman
- Fred Vest as Ranch Hand
- Woody Watson as Legionnaire
- Andrea Wauters as young Pamela Barnes
- Bethany Wright as Laurette
- Joel Allen as young Gary Ewing (uncredited)

== Home media ==
Warner Home Video released Dallas: The Early Years on DVD April 12, 2011 on the Dallas: The Movie Collection two-disc set.
