= Five Branded Women =

1960 film by Martin Ritt

- U.S. film poster
- Directed by: Martin Ritt
- Screenplay by: Ivo Perilli; Michael Wilson (Note: Originally uncredited.); Paul Jarrico (Note: Originally uncredited.)
- Based on: Jovanka and the Others by Ugo Pirro
- Produced by: Dino De Laurentiis
- Starring: Silvana Mangano; Vera Miles; Barbara Bel Geddes; Jeanne Moreau; Richard Basehart; Harry Guardino; Steve Forrest; Alex Nicol; Carla Gravina; Van Heflin
- Cinematography: Giuseppe Rotunno
- Edited by: Jerry Webb
- Music by: Angelo Francesco Lavagnino
- Production companies: Paramount Pictures; De Laurentiis Cinematografica
- Distributed by: Paramount Pictures (U.S.); De Laurentiis Cinematografica (Italy)
- Release date: March 15, 1960
- Running time: 115 minutes
- Countries: United States; Italy
- Language: English
- Box office: $1,000,000 (US/ Canada)

Five Branded Women (Italian: Jovanka e le altre, lit. 'Jovanka and the others') is a 1960 war film directed by Martin Ritt and starring Silvana Mangano, Barbara Bel Geddes, Jeanne Moreau, Vera Miles, Carla Gravina, Richard Basehart and Van Heflin. The film centers on five women in Nazi-occupied Yugoslavia who are banished from their village after being accused of consorting with the German forces. They flee into the mountains, where they join the local Partisans.

An American and Italian co-production by Dino De Laurentiis and Paramount Pictures, the film premiered in Rome on March 15, 1960.

== Plot ==
For various reasons, five women in a Nazi-occupied Yugoslavian village conduct sexual trysts with Paul Keller, a German sergeant. Some are willing, while others have to be persuaded. During his fifth and final tryst, Keller is caught by Partisans and castrated. The German forces demand the women identify the Partisans, but when they refuse, they are banished from the town.

The Partisans order that five women be punished for consorting with Keller; their hair is cut off. German Captain Reinhardt points out to his superior that the women now pose a problem. If they remain free, they show the power of the Partisans. If they are locked up, they are being punished for fraternizing with the occupiers. The German commander orders that they leave town.

The women — Jovanka, Ljuba, the widow Marija, Mira and Daniza — decide to stick together. Daniza cuts her wrist in a suicide attempt, then reveals she is being punished for something she did not do: sleep with Keller.

Walking along a road, they witness an ambush by Partisans. While the Germans pursue their attackers into the woods, Jovanka takes the boots, coat and pistol of a dead soldier; the others do the same. They take shelter in a shepherd's hut and are found by two Home Guards, collaborators working for the Germans. The men pick Jovanka and Ljuba to rape, but Jovanka shoots them with her pistol.

They bathe in a mountain pool; when Mira undresses, the others see she is pregnant. One of the Partrisans, Branko, spots them and comes down for a closer look. Each of the women reveals why they slept with Keller, or in Daniza's case, rejected his advances. Ljuba suggests they join the Partisans, but Jovanka wants nothing to do with the war. She goes for a walk. Branko grabs her, then stops when he uncovers her shaven head during the ensuing struggle and starts laughing. He rejoins his unit, led by Velko.

Later, when Jovanka sees the atrocities committed by a small German unit, she is so infuriated that she shoots at the departing convoy. The other women join in. Fortunately for them, Velko, who had also planned to ambush the convoy, reinforces them. The surviving Germans flee, but Reinhardt is captured by Ljuba.

The women join Velko's unit, though Jovanka has to be persuaded to do so. Velko emphatically states that there must be no romantic relationships between the men and the women, as it endangers them all. Only Branko flouts the order. One night, while he and Daniza are on sentry duty, he persuades her to have sex with him. Three German soldiers slip past while they are sleeping afterwards. Fortunately, they are spotted and killed, but the couple's dereliction of duty earns them a death sentence, despite Jovanka's protests. Jovanka and Ljuba are included in the firing squad.

The next day, the Partisans set out to attack the women's town during the celebration of the tenth anniversary of the Third Reich, leaving Ljuba and Mira to guard Reinhardt (who will either be part of a prisoner exchange or executed). Mira goes into labor; while Ljuba comforts her, Reinhardt has the opportunity to take her weapon, but instead acts as midwife. Afterward, Ljuba asks him what he did before the war; he tells her he was a philosophy professor. He also informs her that no Partisans are taken prisoner; they are killed, so he will not be exchanged. He tries to escape, forcing Ljuba to shoot him.

Velko's unit infiltrates the town. He reveals his feelings for Jovanka by ordering her to leave town and help cover their retreat, but she disobeys him. The attack is a success. German dignitaries are blown up with a bomb delivered by Milan, disguised in a German uniform. A reconnaissance plane spots the retreating Partisans, and the Germans set out in pursuit. The Partisans abandon their camp and flee over a mountain. When the Germans get too close, Velko decides to remain behind with a machine gun to delay them. Jovanka insists on staying with him. While they wait, Jovanka says there will never be peace, but Velko says that people change, that she has changed and so has he himself.

== Cast ==
- Silvana Mangano as Jovanka
- Jeanne Moreau as Ljuba
- Vera Miles as Daniza
- Barbara Bel Geddes as Marja
- Carla Gravina as Mira
- Van Heflin as Velko
- Richard Basehart as Captain Eric Reinhardt
- Harry Guardino as Branko
- Steve Forrest as Sergeant Paul Keller
- Alex Nicol as Svenko
- Pietro Germi as Partisan commander
- Romolo Valli as Mirko
- Sidney Clute as Milan
- Gérard Landry as Partisan officer
- Teresa Pellati as Boja
- Erwin Strahl as Major Strauss
- Guido Celano as Drago
- Franca Dominici as Zorica
- Tonio Selwart as General Jaeger
- Gérard Herter as Colonel von Elm
- Vera Fusek as Lena
- Aldo Silvani as Old Man
- Tiberio Mitri as Milko
- Giacomo Rossi Stuart as Petar

== Production ==
=== Writing ===
The film is based on the novel Jovanka e le altre (English: "Jovanka and the others") by Italian author Ugo Pirro. In the original novel, the occupying army was Italian instead of German. The nationality was changed by the producers, who feared a backlash from the Italian government. Dino De Laurentiis says when he heard the story he instantly decided on a poster of five women with shaved heads.

Screenwriters Paul Jarrico and Michael Wilson had both been subject to the Hollywood blacklist. Consequently, they were both uncredited on the original release, which credited Ivo Perilli as the sole author. In 1998, the Writers Guild of America restored Jarrico and Wilson's credits.

=== Casting ===
Gina Lollobrigida was initially cast as Jovanka. However, in mid-July 1959, she left the production. Various sources gave conflicting reasons for her departure: that she did not want to shave her head, that she objected to blacklisted screenwriters Wilson and Jarrico. Another source claimed that director Ritt got her removed. She was replaced by Mangano.

This was Jeanne Moreau's American film debut. She said,

I accepted the film only to pay my taxes and not because I liked it. I was justly punished for it. But I'm pleased I did it. I became friends with Silvana [Mangano] and it was fun to work with Martin and I learned Italian."

Shirley MacLaine, Sophia Loren, Barbara Nichols, Julie Harris, Claire Bloom and Ava Gardner were considered for roles, and Lee Remick was offered a part but turned it down.

It was reported that four of the five main actresses really had their heads shaved, the exception being Bel Geddes, who was to perform in a Broadway play immediately after the film ended production. A modern source stated, however, that Moreau wore a skullcap.

=== Filming ===
Filming took place in northern Italy and the city of Klagenfurt, Austria, which has a heavy Slovene influence. Plans to shoot on-location in Yugoslavia fell through when the government disapproved of the script; according to one source, officials felt that foreigners could not do justice to the country's past. it was not until 1964's The Long Ships that Western film productions being shot in the country would be more normalized. Filming started in July 1959.

Parts of the dialogue were dubbed.

Ritt later said he made the film just for money. "It just about wrecked me. I became ill. It was a terrible mistake."

== Reception ==
The Variety review noted that "The film occasionally plots an overly familiar conflict, but it catches the fervency of the resistance movement." The article praised the performances of Basehart ("excellent"), Heflin ("one of his better roles") and Forrest ("scores with an electrifying scene, shouting of his mutilation by the partisans."). The actresses are also lauded: "Not all the roles are long, but they are universally rewarding, and the five actresses successfully fashion contrasting personalities."

Howard Thompson, critic for The New York Times, disagreed, writing:

Even with the battle scenes and the ripsnorting finale, this Dino De Laurentiis production moves like molten lead under Martin Ritt's direction. ... only the tender relationship of Jeanne Moreau and Richard Basehart, as a captured Nazi, holds the slightest interest. Harry Guardino, Alex Nicol and Steve Forrest are sturdy sideliners in a thuddingly flat import that, once the five picked chickens begin to regain their tresses, seems like many predecessors.

== See also ==
- List of American films of 1960
