= Steve Forrest (actor) =

American actor (1925–2013)

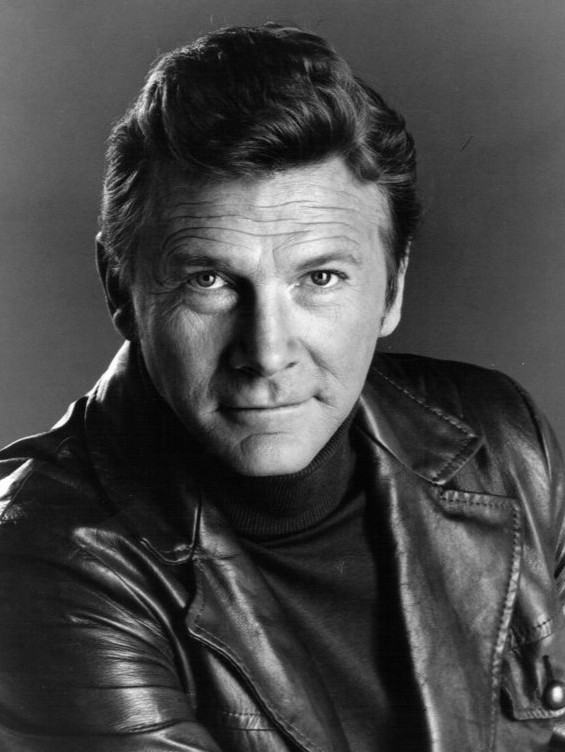
- Steve Forrest in publicity photo for S.W.A.T. (1975)
- Born: William Forrest Andrews; September 29, 1925; Huntsville, Texas, U.S.
- Died: May 18, 2013 (aged 87); Thousand Oaks, California, U.S.
- Education: UCLA
- Occupation: Actor
- Years active: 1943–2003
- Spouse: Christine Carilas (m. 1948)
- Children: 3
- Relatives: Dana Andrews (brother)

Steve Forrest (born William Forrest Andrews; September 29, 1925 – May 18, 2013) was an American actor who was well known for his role as Lt. Hondo Harrelson in the hit television series S.W.A.T., which was broadcast on ABC from 1975 to 1976. He was also known for his performance in Mommie Dearest (1981).

== Early years ==
Forrest was born William Forrest Andrews in Huntsville, Texas, the 12th of 13 children of Annis (née Speed) and Charles Forrest Andrews, a Baptist minister. One of his older brothers was film star Dana Andrews.

Forrest enlisted in the United States Army at the age of 18 and fought in the Battle of the Bulge during World War II. In 1950, he earned a bachelor's degree with honors from University of California, Los Angeles, majoring in theater with a minor in psychology.

== Career ==
Forrest worked as a stagehand at the La Jolla Playhouse outside San Diego. There Gregory Peck discovered him, cast him in the Playhouse's production of Goodbye Again, and then arranged for Forrest's first screen test with MGM, where he was signed to a contract.

Among Forrest's notable films were So Big, for which he won the Golden Globe Award for New Star of the Year – Actor, The Longest Day, North Dallas Forty and Mommie Dearest. He had cameo appearances in the comedies Spies Like Us and Amazon Women on the Moon and the 2003 film version of S.W.A.T.

Forrest was also a trained vocalist, and he made his debut on Broadway as boxer Bob Stanton in the 1958 production of the Harnick and Bock musical The Body Beautiful opposite Mindy Carson, Jack Warden and Brock Peters.

Forrest played later U.S. Senator William Borah in the 1963 episode "The Lion of Idaho" of the syndicated television anthology series Death Valley Days. In the storyline, Borah as a young attorney defends a woman in Nampa, Idaho, on a murder charge.

In 1965, Forrest and his family moved to London, where he starred as John Mannering in the title role of the British crime drama The Baron. His other television credits included The DuPont Show with June Allyson, Storefront Lawyers, S.W.A.T., Hollywood Wives and Rod Serling's hour-long Twilight Zone episode "The Parallel," as well as Serling's Night Gallery segment "The Waiting Room".

On a 1969 episode of Gunsmoke titled "Mannon", he portrayed Will Mannon — one of the very few men ever to outdraw Matt Dillon — then reprised the character 18 years later for the 1987 television film Gunsmoke: Return to Dodge with James Arness. He appeared in four Gunsmoke episodes, among them a 1973 episode "The Widowmaker", considered by many to be one of the best episodes.

Jock Ewing, the character played by Jim Davis in the television series Dallas from 1978 to 1981, was presumed to have been killed in a helicopter crash during the 1981–1982 season, although Jock's body was never found. This storyline was written into the series script on account of Davis' real-life death. In 1986 Lorimar Television, now renamed Lorimar Tele-Pictures, extended Forrest's contract from the 1985–1986 season of "Dallas" (the "Dream Season"), during which he had played the character Ben Stivers. They brought him back as a similar character renamed Wes Parmalee, who would be revealed to actually be Jock Ewing, in the 1986-1987 season. While the season was still in production, the news leaked that Forrest would be playing the new Jock Ewing. Fans of the show believed the new storyline was disrespectful to the memory of Davis. Lorimar was forced to drop the Wes Parmalee character and change the story outcome.

In 1953, he earned the Most Promising Newcomer award from the Golden Globes for his performance in the Warner Bros. film So Big. In a career that spanned six decades, among films he appeared in were Prisoner of War (1954), The Living Idol (1957), Flaming Star (1960), The Longest Day (1962), Rascal (1969), The Wild Country (1970), North Dallas Forty (1979), Mommie Dearest (1981), Sahara (1983), Amazon Women on the Moon (1987) and S.W.A.T. (2003). Among television series in which he was featured were Playhouse 90, Outlaws, Death Valley Days, The Virginian, Rawhide, Bonanza, Insight, Alias Smith and Jones, Ironside, Night Gallery, Medical Center, The Rookies, Dallas and several different roles on Murder, She Wrote. However, his most memorable television role was that of Lt. Dan "Hondo" Harrelson on S.W.A.T. from 1975 through 1976.

For his role in Mommie Dearest, Forrest won the Razzie for Worst Supporting Actor.

== Personal life ==
Forrest married Christine Carilas on December 23, 1948. They had three sons: Michael, Forrest, and Stephen.

An avid and accomplished golfer, Forrest often played in charity tournaments. He competed in 1976, for example, on the U.S. team at the Bing Crosby Great Britain vs. U.S.A. Tournament, which was held that year in Scotland at Gleneagles.

Forrest died of natural causes on May 18, 2013, in Thousand Oaks, California, aged 87.

== Partial filmography ==
- The Ghost Ship (1943) as Sailor (uncredited)
- Sealed Cargo (1951) as Holtz (uncredited) (this film starred his brother Dana Andrews)
- Geisha Girl (1952) as Rocky Wilson
- The Bad and the Beautiful (1952) as Actor in Georgia's Screen Test (uncredited)
- The Clown (1953) as Young Man
- Last of the Comanches (1953) as Lieutenant Floyd (uncredited)
- Battle Circus (1953) as Sergeant
- I Love Melvin (1953) as Photographer on Crane (uncredited)
- Dream Wife (1953) as Louis
- The Band Wagon (1953) as Passenger on Train (uncredited)
- So Big (1953) as Dirk DeJong
- Take the High Ground! (1953) as Lobo Naglaski
- Phantom of the Rue Morgue (1954) as Professor Paul Dupin
- Prisoner of War (1954) as Corporal Joseph Robert Stanton
- Rogue Cop (1954) as Eddie Kelvaney
- The Long Gray Line (1955) as Sergeant (uncredited)
- Bedevilled (1955) as Gregory Fitzgerald
- Meet Me in Las Vegas (1956) as Steve Forrest (uncredited)
- The Living Idol (1957) as Terry Matthews
- Alfred Hitchcock Presents (TV series) (1957) (Season 2 Episode 22: "The End of Indian Summer") as Joe Rogers
- Alfred Hitchcock Presents (TV series) (1958) (Season 3 Episode 33: "Post Mortem") as Steve Archer
- It Happened to Jane (1959) as Lawrence Clay "Larry" Hall
- Heller in Pink Tights (1960) as Clint Mabry
- Dick Powell's Zane Grey Theatre (1960, TV series) as Mike Bagley
- Five Branded Women (1960) as Sergeant Paul Keller
- Flaming Star (1960) as Clint Burton
- The Second Time Around (1961) as Dan Jones
- The Longest Day (1962) as Captain Harding
- The Twilight Zone (1963, TV series) as Major Robert Gaines
- The Yellow Canary (1963) as Hub Wiley
- The Virginian (1963–1964, TV series) as James Templeton / Roger Layton
- 12 O'Clock High (1965, TV series) as Major Peter Gray
- Rawhide (1965, TV series) as Cable
- The Fugitive (1965, TV series) as Barry Craft
- Burke's Law (1965, TV series) as Jocko Creighton
- The Baron (1966–1967, TV series) as John Mannering 'The Baron'
- Cimarron Strip (1967–1968, TV series) as Clayton Tyce / Wiley Harpe
- Bonanza (1967-1969, TV series) as Dan Logan / Josh Tanner
- Rascal (1969) as Willard North
- Gunsmoke (1970–1973, TV series) as Scott Coltrane / Cord Wrecken / Cole Morgan / Will Mannon
- The High Chaparral (1970, TV series) as Johnny Rondo
- The F.B.I. (1970) as Lee Barrington
- The Wild Country (1970) as Jim Tanner
- The Late Liz (1971) as Jim Hatch
- Mission: Impossible (1971, TV series) as Edward Granger
- Nichols (1971, TV series) as Sam Yeager
- Alias Smith and Jones (1972, TV series) as Jake Halloran
- Night Gallery (1972, TV series) as Grant Wilson (segment "Hatred Unto Death") / Sam Dichter (segment "The Waiting Room")
- The Sixth Sense (1972, TV series) as Glenn Tuttle
- Ghost Story (1972, TV series) as Andrew Alcott
- Hec Ramsey (1972, TV series) as Wes Durham
- The Streets of San Francisco (1973, TV series) as Art Styles
- The Hanged Man (1974) (TV pilot) as James Devlin
- The Six Million Dollar Man (1974, TV series) as Quail
- Cannon (1974, TV series) as Arthur Rogers
- S.W.A.T. (1975–1976, TV series) as Lieutenant Dan "Hondo" Harrelson
- Testimony of Two Men (1977, TV series) as Martin Eaton
- Last of the Mohicans (1977, TV movie) as Hawkeye
- Maneaters Are Loose! (1978) as David Birk
- The Deerslayer (1978) as Hawkeye
- Captain America (1979, TV movie) as Lou Brackett
- North Dallas Forty (1979) as Conrad Hunter
- Condominium (1980, TV movie) as Gus Garver
- Mommie Dearest (1981) as Greg Savitt
- Hotline (1982, TV movie) as Tom Hunter
- Malibu (1983, TV movie) as Rich Bradley
- Sahara (1983) as Gordon
- Hollywood Wives (1985, TV series) as Ross Conti
- Spies Like Us (1985) as General Sline
- Dallas (1985 & 1986, TV series) as Ben Stivers (1985, The Dream Season) & Wes Parmalee (1986)
- Amazon Women on the Moon (1987) as Captain Steve Nelson (segment "Amazon Women on the Moon")
- Gunsmoke: Return to Dodge (1987, TV movie) as Will Mannon
- Dream On (1990, TV series) as Eden Pilott
- Murder, She Wrote — Night of the Coyote (1992, TV series)
- Storyville (1992) as Judge Quentin Murdoch
- Columbo: A Bird in the Hand (1992) as Big Fred
- Killer: A Journal of Murder (1995) as Warden Charles Casey
- S.W.A.T. (2003) as SWAT Truck Driver (cameo) (final film role)

== Radio appearances ==
Year	Program	Episode/source
1953	Lux Radio Theatre	The Girl in White
