= Pen (play) =

Pen is a play by David Marshall Grant. It has been produced at the Guthrie Theater in Minneapolis, Minnesota, and Playwrights Horizons in New York City.
