= Labor of Love (1998 film) =

- Written by: Nina Shengold
- Directed by: Karen Arthur
- Starring: Marcia Gay Harden; David Marshall Grant
- Theme music composer: Laura Karpman
- Country of origin: United States
- Original language: English

Production
- Producer: Ken Raskoff
- Cinematography: Tom Neuwirth
- Editor: Tina Hirsch
- Running time: 96 minutes

Original release
- Network: Lifetime
- Release: May 4, 1998

Labor of Love is a 1998 Lifetime television film starring Marcia Gay Harden and David Marshall Grant. It was directed by Karen Arthur and written by Nina Shengold. The story centers around a single woman (Marcia Gay Harden) who decides to have a baby with her gay best friend (David Marshall Grant). But soon after, she meets the man of her dreams (Daniel Hugh Kelly), which complicates their situation.
