= Loraine Despres =

American novelist and screenwriter

- Education: Northwestern University
- Occupations: Novelist; screenwriter
- Spouse: Carleton Eastlake
- Children: 1

Loraine Despres is an American novelist and screenwriter. Her novels The Scandalous Summer of Sissy LeBlanc (2002) and The Bad Behavior of Belle Cantrell (2005) were Literary Guild and Doubleday Book Club featured selections. Despres wrote episodes for many top network TV shows including The Highlander, The Equalizer, Knots Landing and Dynasty. Most famously, she wrote the Who shot J.R.? episode of Dallas.

== Early years ==
Despres was raised in Amite, Louisiana and graduated from Northwestern University in Evanston, Illinois. She started writing at an early age – writing educational radio in Chicago; advertising in Paris, France; poetry and plays in New Orleans.

In 1975, Despres moved to Los Angeles and was soon writing episodes for TV series.

== Television work ==
External videos
- You can see a video of Loraine Despres, Dick Van Dyke and Mary Crosby discussing the "Who shot J.R.?" episode here

Despres' first television sale was an original script about a man falsely accused of child molestation. Aaron Spelling purchased it for his TV series Family. Her other credits include episodes of The Highlander, The Equalizer, Knots Landing, The Waltons, Dynasty, Crime Story, CHiPS, Family, Love Boat and The Lazarus Syndrome. Despres's most memorable script was the 58th episode of Dallas named Who Done It?, popularly known as "Who shot J.R.?" When it aired on November 21, 1980, over 90 million American viewers – 76% of all television viewers in the U.S. – watched the "Who shot J.R.?" episode. The 53.3 rating was the highest rating of any television episode in U.S. history, a record it held until February 1983 when the final episode of M*A*S*H aired.

Who Done It remains second on the list of all-time most watched television episodes. Dallas went on to finish at #1 in the Nielsen Ratings for three of the next four seasons as a result of the publicity this episode generated.

Internationally, Who Done It still holds the record for the most-watched episode in world television history, with nearly 360 million viewers tuning in to see who shot J.R.

In 2011, Ken Tucker of Entertainment Weekly named Who Done It the greatest cliff-hanger of all time: number one of the seven most "Unforgettable Cliff-Hangers" of prime time dramatic television. According to Tucker, "it was so wittily executed and came as such a surprise...that a nation was transfixed."

== The Scandalous Summer of Sissy LeBlanc ==
External videos
- You can see a video of Loraine Despres discussing The Scandalous Summer of Sissy LeBlanc here

In the 1990s Despres began to write novels. Her first novel The Scandalous Summer of Sissy LeBlanc, published by HarperCollins, dealt with "murder, adultery, and regular church attendance" in the small southern town of Gentry, Louisiana. Booklist described it as: "Set in the small southern town of Gentry, Louisiana, this tale of lust, jealousy and regret unfolds playfully amid a colorful cast of eccentric small-town characters. And although the story maintains a humorous bent, it doesn't shy away from addressing serious issues…fans of romance and contemporary women's fiction will especially enjoy this rather quirky novel."

Library Journal found the novel "excellent…the plot twists are both delightful and surprising…Despres's heroine has spunk, her villains get their comeuppance, and her ending is psychologically satisfying." The New Orleans Times Picayune hailed Sissy LeBlanc as "probably the sexiest, wildest girl ever to live in Gentry, La.," and praised "Loraine Despres' hilariously diverting first novel."

Despres followed The Scandalous Summer of Sissy LeBlanc with The Southern Belle's Handbook: Sissy LeBlanc's Rules to Live By. The Southern Belle's Handbook was also published by HarperCollins.

== The Bad Behavior of Belle Cantrell ==
Her following novel The Bad Behavior of Belle Cantrell was a prequel to Scandalous Summer – the story of Sissy LeBlanc's fiery suffragette grandmother. The novel was set in 1920: the year that women got the vote, prohibition became law, and the revived Ku Klux Klan spread across the U.S. as a money-making pyramid scheme.

Variety found the novel "light, absorbing and shot through with meditations on feminism and anti-Semitism in the 1920s Deep South." Publishers Weekly said that: "Belle Cantrell isn't after virtue, she's after independence. In this prequel to The Scandalous Summer of Sissy LeBlanc, Despres, herself a native Southerner, introduces readers to Sissy's grandmother, the strong-willed Belle of Gentry, Louisiana." Goodreads hailed Belle Cantrell as "A sexy, sassy story of murder, adultery, romance, bigotry, and regular church attendance, with laugh-out-loud humor and a cast of zany, endearing characters you won't forget. The Bad Behavior of Belle Cantrell is a big comic love story . . . and much more. The New Orleans Times Picayune called it "the best prequel of 2005."

The audio version of the novel was narrated by actress Zoe Thomas. AudioFile magazine found that: "From the opening, in which Belle says she hates feeling guilty about having killed her husband, to the madcap close, this story of murder, adultery, earthy sex, and regular church attendance is anything but predictable. Thomas's portrayal of the 1920s' telephone party line, with multiple neighbors who listen in only to abruptly break into the conversation, is hilarious and well done. Most important, Thomas's portrayal of bawdy Belle Cantrell, sassy and full of charm, makes her lifelike and endearing. She sounds something like a funny Julia Roberts. This sexy, sassy, sometimes laugh-out-loud audio is filled with a cast of zany characters you won't soon forget."

== Additional works ==
In addition to her own written work, Despres taught screenwriting at UCLA for seven years and supervised the writing staff of a TV series for Grundy-UFA and RTL Television in Germany. She served on the board of Women In Film and was a trustee for the Women In Film Foundation. She was also a board member of PEN USA.

== Personal life ==
Loraine Despres continues to live in Los Angeles with her husband, Carleton Eastlake, a writer/producer who served on the board of directors of the Writers Guild of America, West.

Despres' son, David Mulholland, is a writer/editor living in London.

== See also ==
- Who shot J.R.?
- Who Done It?
- Dallas
