= Molly Hagan =

American actress

- Born: Minneapolis, Minnesota, U.S.
- Education: Northwestern University
- Occupation: Actress
- Years active: 1985–present
- Known for: Code of Silence; Some Kind of Wonderful; Herman's Head
- Website: mollyhagan.com

Molly Hagan is an American actress. She co-starred in films Code of Silence (1985), Some Kind of Wonderful (1987), The Dentist (1996), Election (1999), and Sully (2016), and is also known for her roles in television on Herman's Head (1991–1994), Unfabulous (2004–2007), and Walker (2021–2024).

== Life and career ==
Hagan was born in Minneapolis, Minnesota. She was raised in Fort Wayne, Indiana, and attended Northwestern University.

Hagan played Diana Luna alongside Chuck Norris in the 1985 action film Code of Silence. Other films in which she appeared include Some Kind of Wonderful. She portrayed the young Miss Ellie Ewing in the television movie Dallas: The Early Years (a prequel of the long-running soap opera Dallas), and she has appeared in several other television series, including the 1980s situation comedy The Golden Girls as Caroline, the daughter of Miles Webber, Rose's romantic partner.

Hagan starred in the series Nutt House, which had a six-week run in 1989, and Herman's Head, which ran on Fox from 1991 to 1994. She portrayed Angel, one of the four characters inside Herman, and represented his sensitivity. She was in two episodes of the detective mystery series Columbo, "Murder, Smoke and Shadows" (1989), and "Butterfly in Shades of Grey" (1994). She also appeared twice on Murder, She Wrote (in two different roles). At the end of the second season of Star Trek: Deep Space Nine, she played a young Vorta called Eris in "The Jem'Hadar". She appeared in three episodes of the third season of Becker, and also appeared on Seinfeld as Sister Roberta, the Latvian Orthodox novice whom Kramer nearly took from the church, and a cooking teacher on Friends. She played a trailer-trash mother in a Jerry Springer-based movie, Ringmaster. She played Diane McAllister in the 1999 movie Election opposite Matthew Broderick. Hagan also played Coach Crenshaw in Air Bud: Seventh Inning Fetch.

Hagan played the mother of Emma Roberts's character Addie in the Nickelodeon series Unfabulous from 2004 to 2007. She also made guest appearances in many television series, such as Charmed, Bones, Grey's Anatomy, Desperate Housewives, Ghost Whisperer, Cold Case, Private Practice, The Closer, and NYPD Blue. Hagan also appeared in Disney Channel Original Movie Princess Protection Program in 2009, and had another guest appearance in an episode of the Disney Channel sitcom Liv and Maddie. In 2014, Hagan was cast as the lead character's mother in The CW series, iZombie, based on the DC Comics. She later made recurring guest appearances in Jane the Virgin, The Orville, No Good Nick, and Truth Be Told. In 2017, she co-starred in the NBC limited series Law & Order True Crime, and in 2020, was cast in a series-regular role as the title character's mother in the CW crime series, Walker.

== Filmography ==
=== Film ===
Year	Title	Role	Notes
1985	Code of Silence	Diana Luna	
1987	Some Kind of Wonderful	Shayne	
1988	Fresh Horses	Ellen	
1995	French Exit	Alice	
1996	The Dentist	Jessica	
1996	Sometimes They Come Back... Again	Officer Violet Searcey	
1998	Ringmaster	Connie Zorzak	
1999	Election	Diane McAllister	
2000	Playing Mona Lisa	Jenine Goldstein	
2000	Miracle in Lane 2	Sheila Yoder	
2002	Air Bud: Seventh Inning Fetch	Coach Crenshaw	
2002	Defining Maggie	Maggie	
2002	They Shoot Divas, Don't They?	Diane	
2005	Tom's Nu Heaven	Dr. Randy	
2007	Holly Hobbie and Friends: Best Friends Forever	Teresa	Voice role
2008	Henry Poole Is Here	Pediatrician	
2008	The Babysitter	Mrs. Jones	Short film
2008	The Lucky Ones	Pat Cheaver	
2009	Just Peck	Ms. Sears	
2009	Cost of Living	Penny	Short film
2010	Love Shack	Debbie Vanderspiegl	
2011	Red State	Janet Keenan	
2013	Miss Dial	Potato Shredder Caller	
2014	BFFs	Rebecca	
2014	Ask Me Anything	Caroline Kampenfelt	
2014	Not Safe for Work	Janine	
2014	The Last Light	Meryl	
2015	Cheater, Cheater	Candace	
2015	Navy Seals vs. Zombies	CIA Agent Stacy Thomas	
2015	Step 9	Janine	Short film
2015	We Are Your Friends	Francine	
2016	Sully	Doreen Welsh	
2017	The Keeping Hours	Daniels	
2017	The Garage Sale	Sophie	Also writer and producer
2019	ism	Sophie	
2019	Boris and the Bomb	Dani	
2019	When We Dance	Emilia	Short film
2020	All My Life	Hope	
2021	Disfluency	Professor Parker	

=== Television ===
Year	Title	Role	Notes
1985	Knots Landing	Researcher	Episodes: "One Day in a Row" and "The Long and Winding Road"
1985	First Steps	Pam	Television film
1985	Scarecrow and Mrs. King	Penny McNeil	Episode: "Sour Grapes"
1986	Dallas: The Early Years	Ellie Southworth Ewing	Television film
1986	Mr. Sunshine	Jane	Episode: "Leftwich in Love"
1987	Hotel	Karen	Episode: "All the King's Horses"
1987	ALF	Denise	Episodes: "ALF's Special Christmas: Part 1" and "ALF's Special Christmas: Part 2"
1987	Pat Hobby Teamed with Genius	Katherine Hodge	Television film
1988	Justin Case	Jennifer Spalding	Television film
1988	Shootdown	Elizabeth Moore	Television film
1989	Columbo	Ruth 'Ruthie' Jernigan	Episode: "Murder, Smoke and Shadows"
1989	The Nutt House	Sally Lonnaneck	Series regular, 10 episodes
1990	The Golden Girls	Caroline	Episode: "Triple Play"
1990	Last Flight Out	Pam	Television film
1993	Columbo	Victoria Chase	Episode: "Butterfly in Shades of Grey"
1993	Seinfeld	Sister Roberta	Episode: "The Conversion"
1993	Murder, She Wrote	Dana Ballard	Episode: "Dead to Rights"
1991–94	Herman's Head	Angel	Series regular, 72 episodes
1994	A Perry Mason Mystery: The Case of the Lethal Lifestyle	Laurel Crown	Television film
1994	Star Trek: Deep Space Nine	Eris	Episode: "The Jem'Hadar"
1994	Murder, She Wrote	Amelia Farnum	Episode: "To Kill a Legend"
1994	Love & War	Monica	Episode: "The Bum"
1995	Legend	Paytents	Episode: "Clueless in San Francisco"
1995	Dream On	Eve	Episode: "9 1/2 Days"
1995	The Larry Sanders Show	Ad Executive	Episode: "Brother, Can You Spare 1.2 Million?"
1996	The Rockford Files: Friends and Foul Play	Trudy Wise	Television film
1996–97	Life's Work	Dee Dee Lucas	Series regular, 18 episodes
1997	Diagnosis Murder	Kelly Harris	Episode: "Town Without Pity"
1997	Diagnosis Murder	Paige Jennings	Episode: "Must Kill TV"
1999	Early Edition	Treasury Agent Carolyn Burns	Episode: "The Last Untouchable"
1999	DiResta	Wendy	Episode: "The Torch"
1999	Love Boat: The Next Wave	Elizabeth	Episode: "Divorce, Downbeat and Distemper"
1999	Providence	Mrs. Trish Calloway	Episode: "The Third Thing"
1999	Chicago Hope	Bettina Wallace	Episode: "Humpty Dumpty"
1999	JAG	Melinda Davy	Episode: "Contemptuous Words"
1999	Oh Baby	Annie	Episode: "Friendship"
2000	Strong Medicine	Grace Duke	Episode: "Dependency"
2001	The Invisible Man	Dr. Day	Episode: "Going Postal"
2001	Emeril	Joanna	Episode: "Blind Dates"
2000–01	Becker	Sarah	Recurring role, 3 episodes
2001	Touched by an Angel	Karen	Episode: "Angels Anonymous"
2002	Diagnosis Murder: Town Without Pity	Sgt. Kelly Harris	Television film
2002	Charmed	Karen Young	Episode: "The Fifth Halliwell"
2002	Friends	Sarah	Episode: "The One with the Cooking Class"
2002	Greetings from Tucson	Karen Tobin	Recurring role, 3 episodes
2003	Six Feet Under	Rachel	Episode: "Tears, Bones & Desire"
2003	The Agency	Caroline Magnuson	Episode: "Our Man in Korea"
2003	NYPD Blue	Nancy Ackerman	Episodes: "Keeping Abreast" and "Andy Appleseed"
2004	JAG	Navy Captain	Episode: "Take It Like a Man"
2004	Monk	Ms. Lennington	Episode: "Mr. Monk Gets Fired"
2005	Numb3rs	Fingerprint Technician	Episode: "Identity Crisis"
2005	NCIS	Audrey Vetter	Episode: "Conspiracy Theory"
2005	ER	Meredith Smart	Episode: "Carter est Amoureux"
2007	Murder 101: College Can Be Murder	Hilda Lake	Television film
2007	The Closer	Kathy Reichter	Episode: "Homewrecker"
2007	Side Order of Life	Karma	Episode: "When Pigs Fly"
2007	Private Practice	Karen Adams	Episode: "In Which Addison Finds the Magic"
2004–07	Unfabulous	Sue Singer	Series regular, 29 episodes
2008	Eli Stone	Moira Foote	Episode: "Waiting for That Day"
2008	Cold Case	Lois Rabinski	Episode: "Ghost of My Child"
2008	Fear Itself	Elena Edlund	Episode: "Skin and Bones"
2008	Ghost Whisperer	Penny Jones	Episode: "Ghost in the Machine"
2008	Bones	Elsbeth King	Episode: "The Bone That Blew"
2009	Grey's Anatomy	Jackie	Episode: "Elevator Love Letter"
2009	Princess Protection Program	The Director	Television film
2009	Medium	E.R. Doctor	Episode: "Bite Me"
2011	Chaos	Ms. Lurkin	Episodes: "Pilot" and "Molé"
2011	Cinema Verite	Kaye	Television film
2012	Desperate Housewives	Gillian	Episode: "Any Moment"
2012	TalhotBlond	Beth Brooks	Television film
2012	Perception	Professor	Episode: "Kilimanjaro"
2013	The Mentalist	Elizabeth Hennings	Episode: "Red Velvet Cupcakes"
2013	NCIS: Los Angeles	Peggy Winant	Episode: "Recovery"
2013	Masters of Sex	Sybil	Episode: "Fallout"
2014	Liv and Maddie	Mrs. Wakefield	Episode: "Moms-a-Rooney"
2014	Petals on the Wind	Miss Calhoun	Television film
2014	Longmire	Sylvia Mallory	Episode: "Miss Cheyenne"
2014	Switched at Birth	Tammy Brenawicz	Episode: "And We Bring the Light"
2014	Stalker	Nancy Dalton	Episode: "Fanatic"
2014	Rectify		Episode: "Donald the Normal"
2014	Castle	Daisy May	Episode: "Once Upon a Time in the West"
2014–15	Instant Mom	Eunice Ebnetter	Recurring role, 3 episodes
2015, 2019	iZombie	Eva Moore	Recurring role, 7 episodes
2015	True Detective	Mrs. Harris	Episodes: "The Western Book of the Dead" and "Other Lives"
2015	A Teacher's Obsession	Candace	Television Film
2016–19	Jane the Virgin	Patricia Cordero	Recurring role, 7 episodes
2016	NCIS: New Orleans	Elaine Jarrett	Episode: "Help Wanted"
2016	Mistresses	Dr. Paysinger	Episode: "Under Pressure"
2016	Dead of Summer	Beth Dalton	Episode: "Modern Love"
2016	This Is Us	Grace	Episode: "Career Days"
2017	Better Call Saul	Judge Lindsay Arch	Episode: "Sunk Costs"
2017	Feud	Bette's Doctor	Episode: "You Mean All This Time We Could Have Been Friends?"
2017	Big Little Lies	Dr. Moriarty	Recurring role, 2 episodes
2017	Law & Order True Crime	Joan Vandermolen	Recurring role, 7 episodes
2017–19	The Orville	Drenala Kitan	Recurring role, 2 episodes: "Firestorm", "Home"
2018	Legion	Laura Mercer	Episode: "Chapter 14"
2018	Reverie	Tirzah Hagan	Episodes: "Point of Origin" and "The Key"
2018	Long Lost Daughter	Kathy Rhodes	Television film
2018	How to Get Away with Murder	A.D.A. Nancy Montoya	Episode: "Whose Blood Is That?"
2019	No Good Nick	Dorothy	Recurring role, 9 episodes
2019	Into the Dark	Kiwi	Episode: "A Nasty Piece of Work"
2019–20	Truth Be Told	Susan Carver	Recurring role, 4 episodes
2020	Narcos: Mexico	Stella Mancuso	Episode: "The Big Dig"
2021–24	Walker	Abeline Walker	Series regular
