= David Marshall Grant =

American actor & writer (born 1955)

- Born: June 21, 1955 (age 71); Westport, Connecticut, U.S.
- Education: Yale University (Master of Fine Arts)
- Occupations: Actor, singer, writer, producer
- Years active: 1979–present

David Marshall Grant (born June 21, 1955) is an American actor, singer, writer, and producer.

== Early life and education ==
Grant was born in Westport, Connecticut to physician parents. Immediately after graduating from Connecticut College with an M.F.A. and receiving a certificate in fine arts from the Yale School of Drama, his first paying job was as Richard Gere's lover in the Broadway play Bent. A student at Juilliard during summer breaks from high school, Grant soon joined the Yale Repertory Company during his college days, and in 1978, made an impression in the play Bent.

Grant is the great-great-grandson of the first couple to have their wedding featured in the famous wedding announcement section of The New York Times. He is also a distant cousin to Ulysses S. Grant, the 18th president of the United States.

== Career ==
His first screen role was in the 1979 film French Postcards. He went on to appear in several more films. In 1985, he co-starred with Kevin Costner in American Flyers, John Badham's film on bicycle racing. By this time, Grant was working in episodic television and had the role of Digger Barnes in the miniseries Dallas: The Early Years. In 1987, he played Sonny Binkley in the Matt Dillon film The Big Town. In 1989, he portrayed the gay character Russell Weller on the television show thirtysomething. Although he only appeared in four episodes from 1989 to 1990, the role brought him considerable recognition, particularly in one groundbreaking episode that featured his character in bed with another male character, a scene that caused outcry among conservative sponsors at the time.

Grant played roles in various television shows and movies, including Happy Birthday, Gemini, Legs, Labor of Love, CSI: Miami, Law & Order, Criminal Minds, and Alias. He played a gay husband in the 2004 remake of The Stepford Wives; the father of Anne Hathaway's character in the 2006 film The Devil Wears Prada; and more recently appeared on television in a May 2009 episode of Party Down and in the fifth-season premiere of A Million Little Things in February 2023.

On the stage, Grant is most notable for his portrayal of Joe Pitt in the first Broadway production of Tony Kushner's Angels in America. The role earned him a 1994 Tony Award nomination as Best Actor (Featured Role – Play).

In 1998, Grant began a career as a writer. Snakebit, his first play, premiered at Grove Street Playhouse and transferred to the Century Theatre. The play was nominated for the 1999 Drama Desk Award for Outstanding Play and was nominated for an Outer Critics Circle Award. Current Events, his second play, was produced by Manhattan Theatre Club in 2000. Pen opened in 2006 at Playwrights Horizons. Also in 2006, he began working for the drama series Brothers & Sisters as a screenwriter, story editor and (as of season 2 in September 2007), a series producer. The show was co-produced by Ken Olin, whom Grant had worked with on thirtysomething. In 2012, he was a writer and producer on the musical series Smash.

== Filmography ==
=== Film ===
Year	Title	Role	Notes
1979	French Postcards	Alex	
1980	Happy Birthday, Gemini	Randy Hastings	
1981	The End of August	Robert	
1985	American Flyers	David Sommers	as David Grant
1987	The Big Town	Sonny Binkley	
1988	Bat*21	Ross Carver	
1990	To the Moon, Alice	Yuppie Man	Short film
1990	Air America	Rob Diehl	
1991	Strictly Business	David	
1992	Forever Young	Lt. Col. Wilcox	
1995	Three Wishes	Phil	
1996	The Rock	White House Chief of Staff Hayden Sinclair	Uncredited
1996	The Chamber	Governor David McAllister	
2002	People I Know	Tom Silverton	
2004	The Stepford Wives	Jerry Harmon	
2006	The Devil Wears Prada	Richard Sachs	
2022	Spoiler Alert	Tony	Also writer

=== Television ===
Year	Title	Role	Notes
1981	Kent State	Tom	Television film
1982	American Playhouse	Bob	Episode: "The Shady Hill Kidnapping"
1983	Legs	Sid Lewis	Television film
1983	Sessions	Josh	Television film
1984	Jessie	Billy Harding	Episode: "Pilot"
1986	Dallas: The Early Years	Digger Barnes	Television film
1989	Breaking Point	Osterman	Television film
1989–1990	Thirtysomething	Russell Weller	4 episodes
1990	The Window	Jake	Television short
1990	The Hitchhiker	Jake	Episode: "Windows"
1992	What She Doesn't Know	Brad	Television film
1992	Citizen Cohn	Robert F. Kennedy	Television film
1992	Through the Eyes of a Killer	Max Campbell	Television film
1992	Graham	Jeb	Television film
1993	And the Band Played On	Dennis Seeley	Television film
1995	Chicago Hope	Stephen Tomilson	Episode: "Internal Affairs"
1996	The Lazarus Man	General Philip Sheridan	2 episodes
1996	A Season in Purgatory	Jerry Bradley	Miniseries
1997	Night Sins	Father Tom McCoy	Television film
1997	Law & Order	A.D.A. Charlie Harmon	Episodes: "Harvest" and "Shadow"
1998	Labor of Love	Mickey Wister	Television film
1998	Remembering Sex	Michael	Television film
1998	Nothing Sacred	Father Martin Briggs	6 episodes, 3 unaired
2000	Noriega: God's Favorite	Drug Dealer	Television film
2001	Dawson's Creek	Officer Sullivan	Episode: "Late", uncredited
2002	Law & Order: Criminal Intent	A.D.A. Peter Bonham	Episode: "Best Defense"
2004	CSI: Miami	Headmaster Brooks	Episode: "Murder in a Flash"
2005	Numb3rs	Brent Hauser	Episode: "Dirty Bomb"
2005	Alias	Ivan Curtis	2 episodes
2008	Eli Stone	Martin Ostrow	Episode: "Heartbeat"
2009	Party Down	Stennheiser	Episode: "Stennheiser-Pong Wedding Reception"
2018	Code Black	Dr. Marchant	Episode: "The Business of Saving Lives"; also writer and executive producer
2023	A Million Little Things	Gene Grant	Episode: "The Last Dance"; also writer and executive producer
2024	Death and Other Details	Lawrence Collier	8 episodes
