= Donna Culver Krebbs =

Donna Culver Krebbs-Ewing, Dowling
- Dallas character
- Portrayed by: Susan Howard
- Duration: 1979–1987
- First appearance: March 16, 1979; The Outsiders
- Last appearance: May 15, 1987; Fall of the House of Ewing
- Created by: David Jacobs
In-universe information
- Other names: Donna McCullum
- Occupation: Businesswoman; Lobbyist; Writer
- Spouse: Sam Culver (1976–1979); Ray Krebbs (1981–1987); Andrew Dowling (1987–present)
- Children: Margaret Krebbs
- Stepchildren: David Culver
- Aunts: Minnie

Donna Culver Krebbs is a fictional character in the popular American television series Dallas, played by Susan Howard from 1979 to 1987.

== Casting and creation ==
Susan Howard was cast in the series in 1979. For the second and third seasons, she appeared in a recurring capacity; during the fourth season, she became a regular cast member. In 1986, Howard won Soap Opera Digest Award for Outstanding Actress in a Supporting Role on a Primetime Serial for role. In 1987, the show's producers opted not to renew her contract, stating that her character had run its course (this came at a time when the show was undergoing significant cast changes due to high production costs and declining ratings). However, Howard has claimed this decision was connected to her opposition of what she saw as pro-abortion storylines involving her character.

== Storylines ==
Donna was an intelligent, ambitious and well-regarded politician's wife, married to much older Sam Culver, a former governor of Texas and Speaker of the House who is an old friend and former business partner of Jock Ewing. Sam Culver is most likely based on longtime Texas Congressman and Speaker of the House Sam Rayburn. During her marriage, she began an affair with Ray Krebbs, foreman of Southfork Ranch. However, despite finding love with Ray, Donna decided to remain with Sam because he was dying. After Sam's death, Donna and Ray attempted a reconciliation but she rebuffed his proposal of marriage because she felt it was too soon after Sam's death. Donna then briefly got romantically involved with Cliff Barnes, but their relationship dissolved when Donna backed Bobby Ewing as a replacement for her stepson Dave Culver in the state senate instead of Cliff. Donna then married Ray in 1981 and they lived in a house that Ray built on the outskirts of Southfork Ranch. Since Ray had found out he was Jock Ewing's son, he acted as though he wasn't good enough for Donna, comparing himself to her and Jock's other sons, especially after he made failed attempts to compete in business by working on development projects with Jock and Punk Anderson. After Jock died in a helicopter crash in South America, Ray fell into a deep depression: drinking, neglecting his duties at Southfork, and having an affair with an old girlfriend named Bonnie. However, he and Donna remained married and stuck by each other. While researching her new book on Sam Culver's early years in politics, Donna discovers that Sam and Jock had put Sam's uncle, Jonas Culver, in a mental institution in order to get his land and drill the oil on it, which was the start of the Culver and Ewing family fortunes. Jonas committed suicide shortly after institutionalized.

In the 1984-85 season, Donna and Ray decided to separate due to her emphasis on her new career in the oil industry, but Donna discovered she was pregnant with Ray's child. In the 1985-86 season, Donna and Ray discovered their unborn child had Down syndrome and, despite Ray's efforts for an abortion, Donna decided to keep the child. At a rodeo, she was injured by a bull, causing her to miscarry. She and Ray then adopted a deaf boy named Tony in 1986. However, when star Patrick Duffy decided to return to the show — despite his character Bobby having died a season earlier — the entire 1985-86 season was relegated to a dream. As a result, in the following season, Donna was still pregnant, having never miscarried. This time, she decided to divorce Ray. Donna moved to Washington, D.C., and became a lobbyist for the oil industry. During this time, she met Senator Andrew Dowling and they started a relationship. She subsequently gave birth to Ray's daughter, Margaret (named after Ray's mother) in 1987, and she and Ray parted ways as friends.
