= Jock Ewing =

Fictional character from the television series Dallas

- Dallas character
- Portrayed by: Jim Davis (1978–1981); Dale Midkiff (1986)
- Duration: 1978–1981
- First appearance: April 2, 1978; Digger's Daughter
- Last appearance: April 10, 1981; New Beginnings
- Created by: David Jacobs
- Spin-off appearances: Dallas: The Early Years (1986)
In-universe information
- Occupation: Chairman of Ewing Oil (1930–81); President of Ewing Oil (1930–77); Co-owner of Southfork Ranch (1936–81); Investor in Cyberbyte (as told in Dallas: J.R. Returns)
- Family: Ewing
- Father: Leander Ewing
- Brothers: Jason Ewing
- Wife: Amanda Lewis (1927–1930); Ellie Southworth (1936–1982)
- Sons: J.R. Ewing; Gary Ewing; Ray Krebbs; Bobby Ewing
- Grandsons: James Beaumont; John Ross Ewing III; Christopher Ewing (adoptive); Bobby Ewing II; Lucas Krebbs; Unnamed grandson (J.R.'s child with Cally)
- Granddaughters: Lucy Ewing; Betsy Ewing; Margaret Krebbs; Molly Whittaker unnamed granddaughter (J.R.'s daughter with an unknown woman)
- Nephews: Jack Ewing
- Nieces: Jamie Ewing Barnes
- Other relatives: Jimmy Beaumont

John Ross "Jock" Ewing Sr. (1909–1982) is a fictional character in the American television series Dallas created by David Jacobs. Jock was played by Jim Davis in the show's first four seasons from 1978 to 1981, and as a young man by Dale Midkiff in the made-for-TV movie prequel The Early Years in 1986. Jock founded Ewing Oil in 1930 and was the patriarch of the Ewing family.

== Character biography ==
=== Early life and career ===
John Ross "Jock" Ewing Sr. was born in 1909, the younger of two sons born to Leander Ewing. Through his older brother, Jason, Jock got his first job in an oil field in Texas. While riding in a train boxcar, Jock met Willard "Digger" Barnes and the two became friends. Jock, Digger, and Jason all became wildcatters and began drilling their own fields. Digger had a unique ability to smell oil underground and with Jock's business skills they began making a fortune. Jason and Digger didn't get on much, while Jock stood up for Digger in those days. Jason eventually left Texas to wildcat in Alaska, marrying a woman named Nancy Shaw, with whom he had a son, Jack, and a daughter, Jamie. Jock and Digger returned to Texas from Alaska, where Jock met Digger's girlfriend, Ellie Southworth. In the long run, Digger's drinking and undependability made Miss Ellie see that Digger would never change and that Digger was not the type of man to marry, and she left Digger for Jock. Digger started to wander across the country after Ellie left him but Jock and Digger continued with their oil business ventures for a few more years. Even as late as 1939, Jock and Digger both signed a deal to share the profits of Ewing 23 between themselves and their heirs in perpetuity. However, when Ewing 6 came in, Jock put the field in his name only, to prevent Digger from gambling and drinking his half away. Digger was furious and he claimed that Jock had stolen the wells for himself, ending their friendship and business relationship.

=== Marriages and children ===
Ellie Southworth was desperate to save Southfork, which was hit hard by the Great Depression, but Jock was reluctant to marry, even after Miss Ellie chose him over Digger, because unbeknownst to Miss Ellie, Jock was previously married to a woman named Amanda Lewis and looked after her psychiatric needs. Amanda had suffered a mental breakdown shortly after she and Jock were married and Jock put her in a mental hospital. The doctor told Jock that Amanda would never recover and advised Jock to divorce her, which he eventually did in 1930. In 1936, Jock and Miss Ellie married on the day that Miss Ellie's family was about to lose Southfork and it was well known that Jock was the only man in Texas with the money to save the ranch. Jock had a fragile and stormy relationship with Miss Ellie's father, Aaron Southworth, and with her brother Garrison; however, Barbara Southworth seemed to accept her new son-in-law, if only for Miss Ellie's sake. On his deathbed, Aaron accepted Jock as part of his family by giving him his favorite gun. Jock and Miss Ellie had three sons together, J.R., Gary and Bobby. Jock served in World War II, where he and an old army buddy, Tom Mallory, were shot down in a mission in Holland. They later returned to save the families who sheltered them. During his term in Britain, Jock had an affair with an Army nurse from Emporia, Kansas, named Margaret Hunter. Jock was shipped off to France and Margaret returned to the United States. She married her fiancé, Amos Krebbs and soon thereafter gave birth to Jock's illegitimate son, Ray Krebbs. After the war, Jock returned to Southfork and confessed to Miss Ellie about his affair with Margaret Hunter. She forgave him and they moved on. In 1948, Amos Krebbs left Margaret Hunter, leaving her to raise Ray as a single parent. In 1960, a 15-year-old Ray Krebbs showed up at Southfork with a note from his mother asking Jock to help Ray. Jock made Ray a hand on Southfork. Neither Jock, Miss Ellie nor Ray knew that Jock was Ray's father until 20 years later, when Amos Krebbs came to Dallas and revealed that Jock was Ray's father, bringing proof to back up his claim. Jock then welcomed Ray into the Ewing family and personally explained it all to his family.

As the years passed from the 1930s onwards, Jock built Ewing Oil into one of the most powerful independent oil companies in Texas, much to the bitterness and jealousy of his former friend and business partner, Digger Barnes. Jock also became a successful rancher. Jock "took over raising" his eldest son J.R., showing him "tough love" and made him one of the most cunning and ruthless oil barons in the oil business. Jock came to heavily rely on J.R. in the management of Ewing Oil, giving J.R. "the fever for big business," but also lamenting that he "never taught him when to stop" when J.R. nearly lost Southfork in a reckless business deal he entered into without Jock's knowledge. Jock, for the most part, ignored his second son Gary, whom Jock considered weak and lacking the Ewing character, as Gary ran away from responsibility, began drinking excessively to handle the pressures of being a teenage husband and father and couldn't stand up to J.R.'s bullying. Jock generally spoiled his youngest son, Bobby, who Jock considered to be "the best of the lot". Bobby had the morals that J.R. lacked and embraced Jock's favoritism. However, Bobby was often emotional, short-tempered and lacked the intelligence, drive, and focus to succeed in the oil business preferring football, women, ranching and enjoying the social benefits of being a Ewing, which was earned by the hard work of Jock and J.R.

=== Retirement and death ===
In 1977, Jock retired as president of Ewing Oil. He made J.R. his successor and took a more active role in running Southfork with foreman Ray Krebbs.

Jock and Ellie briefly separated in 1981 after Miss Ellie learned that Jock was the power behind Takapa, a land development deal that she was fighting against on the grounds of conservationism. After Ellie refused his order to back down and stay out of the matter, Jock left Southfork. However, they quickly reconciled and went on a second honeymoon to Paris. Upon returning to the United States, Jock and Miss Ellie arrived in Washington, D.C., where they were met by the U.S. State Department with a request for Jock to lead the development of the oil industry in Venezuela. Ellie returned to Southfork alone, while Jock attended conferences in Washington. Jock briefly returned to Dallas for a few hours before leaving for Venezuela. While flying back from Venezuela to Texas, the helicopter Jock was in collided with a small plane and crashed into a lake. Jock's body was never found, but he was declared dead in 1982. The storyline involving Jock's death was necessitated by the death of actor Jim Davis. A tribute to Davis was shown at the end of the episode "The Search"; a picture of Davis and the words "Jim Davis 1909-1981" was displayed for some moments as the final seconds of musical score played out before the final commercial break. A memorial headstone to Jock stands on Southfork Ranch, beside Miss Ellie's headstone and grave.

=== Wes Parmalee storyline ===
In a storyline during the 1986–87 season of the show, a man named Wes Parmalee (portrayed by Steve Forrest) came to Dallas, where Clayton and Ray hired him as ranch foreman on Southfork. One day, Miss Ellie found Jock's belt buckle, knife, letters and photo of a young Miss Ellie in Parmalee's room. Wes then claimed to be Jock Ewing, and that he had survived the helicopter accident, which necessitated plastic surgery and rehab in a South American hospital. After passing a series of tests set by J.R. and Bobby, including X-ray tests, a polygraph test and knowledge about the Ewing family, including Jock's first wife Amanda and Ray being Jock's son, Wes convinced many in Dallas, in addition to Miss Ellie, Ray and several other members of the Ewing family, that he could be Jock. However, Clayton, Bobby and J.R. utterly refused to believe any suggestion that Wes was Jock. Bobby flew down and talked with the doctor who had treated Jock for a severe fever while he was in South America. Bobby returned to Southfork and revealed this information at a Ewing barbecue, where Jock's best friend Punk Anderson said that while he had the fever, Jock was telling the history of the Ewing family. This small piece of evidence against Wes Parmalee being Jock Ewing was seized upon. By then, Ray had told Wes that his presence was causing a lot of trouble to the family, just before Wes went to see Miss Ellie.

Miss Ellie told her family that Wes had told her that he wasn't Jock but this was moments after Bobby arrived from South America in the helicopter. Wes arrived at the barbecue whereupon he went to meet with Miss Ellie played by Barbara Bel Geddes. However, the scene where this meeting with Miss Ellie supposedly happened only occurred off screen. Additionally, with hindsight the fact that his X-ray tests showed he had identical bone breakage scarring identical to Jock's, X-rays would seem to support his claim that he was actually Jock. The producers left Wes's departure deliberately ambiguous.

This particular storyline was an attempt by the show's producers to restore the Jock Ewing character back on Dallas, because the producers had initially decided not to recast immediately after Jim Davis's tragic death back in 1981. The intentions by the producers in season ten (as in season nine) were for Wes Parmalee to actually be revealed as being Jock Ewing. Ultimately, viewer reaction to this storyline was mixed but not favorable, as Miss Ellie had found happiness with her re-marriage to Clayton Farlow (Howard Keel) and that the actor contracted to play Wes/Jock, Steve Forrest (then at 61), was sixteen years younger than his predecessor, Jim Davis. Despite dyeing Forrest's hair white to make him look older (similar to Jim Davis), the Lorimar producers reluctantly yielded to viewers and reneged on the original outcome of the storyline, which would have restored the character of Jock Ewing back on the show. This left the character of Jock supposedly dead for good by the end of the tenth season. However because of the ambiguous nature that the character of Wes departed in, there was a possibility they could bring the character back in the future. However, the character of Wes was not referred to in any of the future seasons. Additionally, although the evidence presented by Bobby was only hearsay there was actually no concrete evidence to disprove that he was actually Jock.

Since the tenth season was broadcast and with the ambiguous ending to Wes Parmalee's departure, some fans have speculated that Wes may have actually been Jock Ewing, but left to spare Miss Ellie and his family any more pain. It is also interesting to note that Wes disappeared after meeting with Jeremy Wendell, who was interested in acquiring Ewing Oil, and who told Wes that he did not care if he was Jock or not, as he was only concerned about defrauding the Ewings.

=== Legacy ===
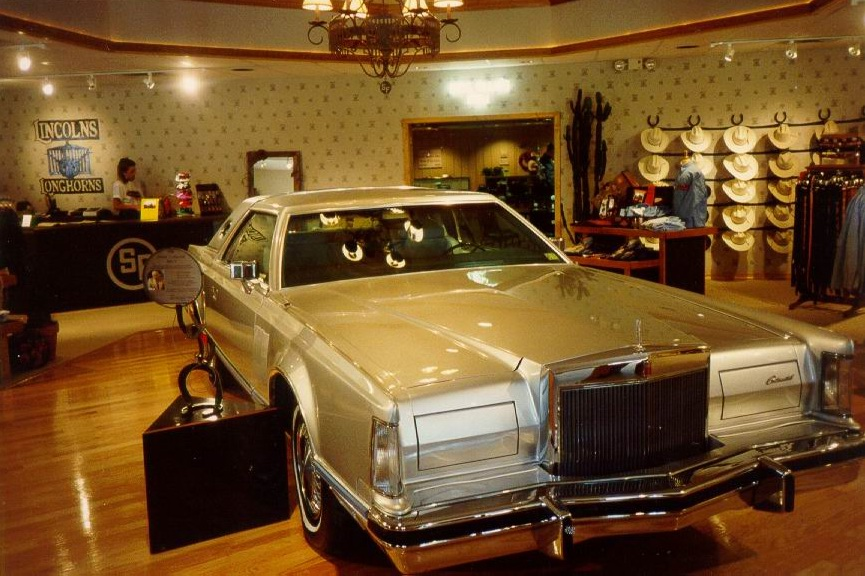
Jock Ewing's Lincoln Mark V in a Southfork gift shop

After Jim Davis' death, artist Ro Kim painted a portrait of the actor in his role as Jock Ewing. The portrait became a focal point of the Dallas set and was featured in a number of episodes. The painting hung in the home of Dallas star Larry Hagman, who played antagonist J.R. Ewing for many years until he decided to sell the portrait at auction in spring 2011. The Southfork Ranch in Parker, Texas, where Dallas exteriors were shot, features a different Jock Ewing portrait as a focal point of its "Jock's Living Room".

Jock Ewing as played by Jim Davis drove the same 1978 Lincoln Mark V with the license plate EWING 1 for all four seasons in which he starred, the vehicle is still on the grounds of the Southfork ranch to this day, parked in one of the gift shops.
