= Susan Howard =

American actress (born 1943)

- Howard in Petrocelli, 1974
- Born: Jeri Lynn Mooney; January 28, 1943 (age 83); Marshall, Texas, U.S.
- Occupations: Actress, activist, writer
- Years active: 1966–1993
- Spouses: Charles Howerton (m. 1962; div. 1964) Calvin Chrane (m. 1974)
- Children: 1

Jeri Lynn Mooney (born January 28, 1943), better known as Susan Howard, is an American actress, writer, and political activist. She portrayed Donna Culver Krebbs on Dallas (1979–1987) and co-starred on Petrocelli (1974–1976). She is also a screenwriter and member of the Writers Guild of America.

== Biography ==
Jeri Lynn Mooney was born in Marshall, Texas, to parents Melba Ruth "Peg" (née Bell) and Cassell Carl Mooney. She has an older brother, James. Her family is of Irish ancestry from Cork. Mooney was recognized for her acting talent while growing up in Marshall. She won a University Interscholastic League award for Best Actress while in high school. Upon graduating from Marshall High School in 1960, she attended the University of Texas for two years, where she studied drama and was a member of the Gamma Phi Beta sorority, before leaving for Los Angeles to become an acting student at the Los Angeles Repertory Company. She later took the stage name Susan Howard as her father had nicknamed her Susie and Howard was a family name.

=== Television ===
Howard had a number of notable guest appearances on television shows during the 1960s and early 1970s: The Flying Nun (1967), I Dream of Jeannie (1968), Star Trek ‘’Day of the Dove’’ (1968), Bonanza (1969), Mannix (1969), Mission: Impossible (1972), and Columbo (1972). She played the first female Klingon ("Mara") on the original Star Trek series and the only one to ever speak.

In 1973, she appeared as Evan Sands on Lorne Greene's series Griff in the episode "Who Framed Billy the Kid?", with Nick Nolte as Billy Randolph.

In 1974, Howard was cast as the co-star of the series Petrocelli. Her performance was nominated for both the Golden Globe and Emmy awards. Despite critical acclaim for Howard, the series was cancelled in 1976.

In 1978, Howard played a key role as Professor Kingsfield's daughter Susan in season 1, episode 10 of The Paper Chase. In 1979, she appeared on Dallas as Donna Culver. The producers of the show liked her performance so much that her guest spot was expanded to an eight-year stint; she has the distinction of being the only Dallas cast member to have written for the series ("Sitting Ducks" and "The Ten Percent Solution"). In 1987, the show decided not to renew her contract. She has blamed this decision on her opposition to what she saw as pro-abortion stories involving her character.

== Personal life ==
Howard was married to actor Charles Howerton from 1962 to 1964. They had one daughter, Lynn. In 1974, she married independent film executive Calvin Chrane. She and her husband have lived in Boerne, Texas, since 1998.

She is a member of the Writers Guild of America and wrote two episodes of Dallas.

=== Politics ===
Since leaving television, Howard has become an increasingly active supporter of conservative causes, especially for gun rights. In 1989, she was co-host of The 700 Club. Howard has been active in the leadership of both the National Rifle Association and the Texas Republican Party. Howard has served as a commissioner of the Texas Parks and Wildlife Department and the Texas Commission on the Arts. She became involved in the NRA after meeting Executive Vice President Wayne LaPierre at the 1988 Republican National Convention in New Orleans.

== Filmography ==
=== Film ===
Year	Title	Role	Notes
1977	Moonshine County Express	Dot Hammer	
1977	Sidewinder 1	Chris Gentry	
1993	Come the Morning	Constance Gibson	

=== Television ===
Year	Title	Role	Notes
1966	Love on a Rooftop	Dorothy	Episode: "Homecoming"
1967	Iron Horse	Bess Hennings / Sara Collins	2 episodes
1967	The Monkees	Bride	S1:E30, "Monkees Manhattan Style"
1967–1968	The Flying Nun	Sister Teresa / Sister Susan	2 episodes
1968	The Second Hundred Years	Sonny	Episode: "Dude Hand Luke"
1968	Tarzan	Gloria	Episode: "Trina"
1968	Star Trek	Mara	Episode: "Day of the Dove"
1968–1969	I Dream of Jeannie	Salesgirl / Miss Temple - Switchboard Operator	2 episodes
1969	Here Come the Brides	Jane	Episode: "Wives for Wakando"
1969	The Outcasts	Julie Mason	Episode: "The Candidates"
1969	Ironside	Jo Lyons	Episode: "A Matter of Love and Death"
1969	The Virginian	Rebecca Teague	Episode: "Halfway Back from Hell"
1969	Bonanza	Laurie Nagel	Episode: "The Medal"
1969	Land of the Giants	Mrs. Garak	Episode: "Collector's Item"
1969	The Silent Gun	Lorisa Cole	Television film
1969–1971	Mannix	Amanda Hewitt (S4-Ep14) / Christina Preston (S3-Ep11)	2 episodes
1970	The New People	Fern	Episode: "The Siege of Fern's Castle"
1970	Quarantined	Dr. Margaret Bedford	Television film
1970	The Immortal	Annie Williams	Episode: "The Legacy"
1971	The F.B.I.	Yvonne Shelby	Episode: "Center of Peril"
1971	The Mod Squad	Gillian Francis	Episode: "Cricket"
1971–1972	Love, American Style	Libby / Susan Parkins	3 episodes
1972	Mission: Impossible	Nora Dawson	Episode: "Committed"
1972	The Sixth Sense	Needa	Episode: "The Man Who Died at Three and Nine"
1972	Medical Center	Linda Crown	Episode: "Deadlock"
1972	Columbo	Shirley Wagner	Episode: "The Most Crucial Game"
1973	The Bold Ones: The New Doctors	Dr. Claudia Schaeffer	Episode: "A Terminal Career"
1973	Marcus Welby, M.D.	Dr. Barbara Kerr / Greta Francis	2 episodes
1973	Savage	Lee Raynolds	Television film
1973	Griff	Evan Sands	Episode: "The Framing of Billy the Kid"
1973	The New Perry Mason	Ellen Ballister	Episode: "The Case of the Jailed Justice"
1973–1977	Barnaby Jones	Frances Dunslay / Sandra Harris	2 episodes
1974	Indict and Convict	Joanna Garrett	Television film
1974	Night Games	Maggie Petrocelli	Television film
1974–1976	Petrocelli	Maggie Petrocelli	44 episodes Nominated—Golden Globe Award for Best Supporting Actress – Television Series (1976); Nominated—Primetime Emmy Award for Outstanding Supporting Actress in a Drama Series (1976)
1976	City of Angels	Ruby Dyson	Episode: "The House on Orange Grove Avenue"
1976	The Rockford Files	Sandy Baylock	Episode: "Feeding Frenzy"
1976	Match Game	Herself	10 Episodes
1977	Most Wanted	Ann Corbin	2 episodes
1977	The Fantastic Journey	Eve Costigan	Episode: "Vortex"
1977	Killer on Board	Julie Clayton	Television film
1977	The Oregon Trail	Amelia McKay	Episode: "The Gold Dust Queen"
1978	Superdome	Nancy Walecki	Television film
1978	The Busters	Joanna Bailey	Television film
1978	The Paper Chase	Susan Fields	Episode: "Kingsfield's Daughter"
1979	The Power Within	Dr. Joanne Miller	Television film
1979	Vegas	Laurie Turner	Episode: "Classic Connection"
1979	Julie Farr, M.D.	Linda	Episode: "Sisters"
1979–1987	Dallas	Donna Culver Krebbs	198 episodes Soap Opera Digest Award for Outstanding Actress in a Supporting Role (1986); Nominated—Soap Opera Digest Award for Outstanding Actress in a Supporting Role (1988)
1980	The Love Boat	Cynthia Bowden	Episode: "The Baby Alarm/Tell Her She's Great/Matchmaker, Matchmaker Times Two"
1987–1988	The 700 Club	Herself / co-host	

== Awards and nominations ==
Year	Association	Category	Nominated work	Result
1976	Golden Globe Awards	Best Supporting Actress – Television Series	Petrocelli	Nominated
1976	Primetime Emmy Awards	Outstanding Supporting Actress in a Drama Series	Petrocelli	Nominated
1986	Soap Opera Digest Awards	Outstanding Actress in a Supporting Role	Dallas	Won
1988	Soap Opera Digest Awards	Outstanding Actress in a Supporting Role	Dallas	Nominated

== See also ==
- "Day of the Dove"

== Bibliography ==
- Featured prominently in the book Petrocelli: San Remo Justice: An Episode Guide and Much More by Sandra Grabman, published 2018 by BearManor Media ISBN 978-1-62933-205-5
