= Barbara Bel Geddes =

American actress (1922–2005)

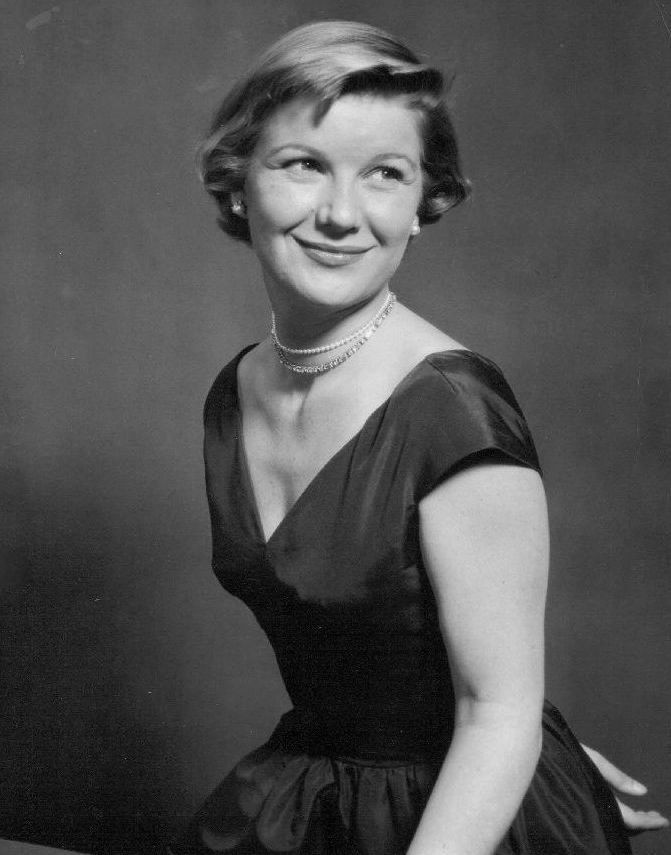
- Bel Geddes in 1952
- Born: October 31, 1922; New York City, U.S.
- Died: August 8, 2005 (aged 82); Northeast Harbor, Maine, U.S.
- Occupation: Actress
- Years active: 1941–1990
- Spouses: Carl Sawyer (m. 1944; div. 1951); Windsor Lewis (m. 1951; died 1972)
- Father: Norman Bel Geddes
- Website: www.barbarabelgeddes.com

Barbara Bel Geddes (October 31, 1922 – August 8, 2005) was an American stage and screen actress, artist, and children's author whose career spanned almost five decades. She received various accolades, including a Primetime Emmy Award and a Golden Globe Award, as well as nominations for an Academy Award and two Tony Awards. Bel Geddes was best known for her starring role as Miss Ellie Ewing in the television series Dallas, while her notable films included I Remember Mama (1948) and Vertigo (1958). In theatre, she is best remembered as Maggie in the original Broadway production of Cat on a Hot Tin Roof in 1955.

== Early and personal life ==
Barbara Bel Geddes was born on October 31, 1922, in New York City, the daughter of Helen Belle (née Schneider; 1891–1938) and stage and industrial designer Norman Bel Geddes (1893–1958). Her father's birth name was Norman Melancton Geddes. In 1916, when he married Helen Belle Schneider, they created the surname Bel Geddes by combining her middle name with Geddes. Barbara Bel Geddes had a sister named Joan who was six years her senior. Bel Geddes married theatrical manager Carl Sawyer (né Schreuer) in 1944; they had one daughter, Susan. They divorced in 1951. Later that year, she married stage director Windsor Lewis, with whom she had a daughter, Betsy. When Lewis became ill in 1967, Bel Geddes suspended her career to care for him; he died in 1972.

== Career ==
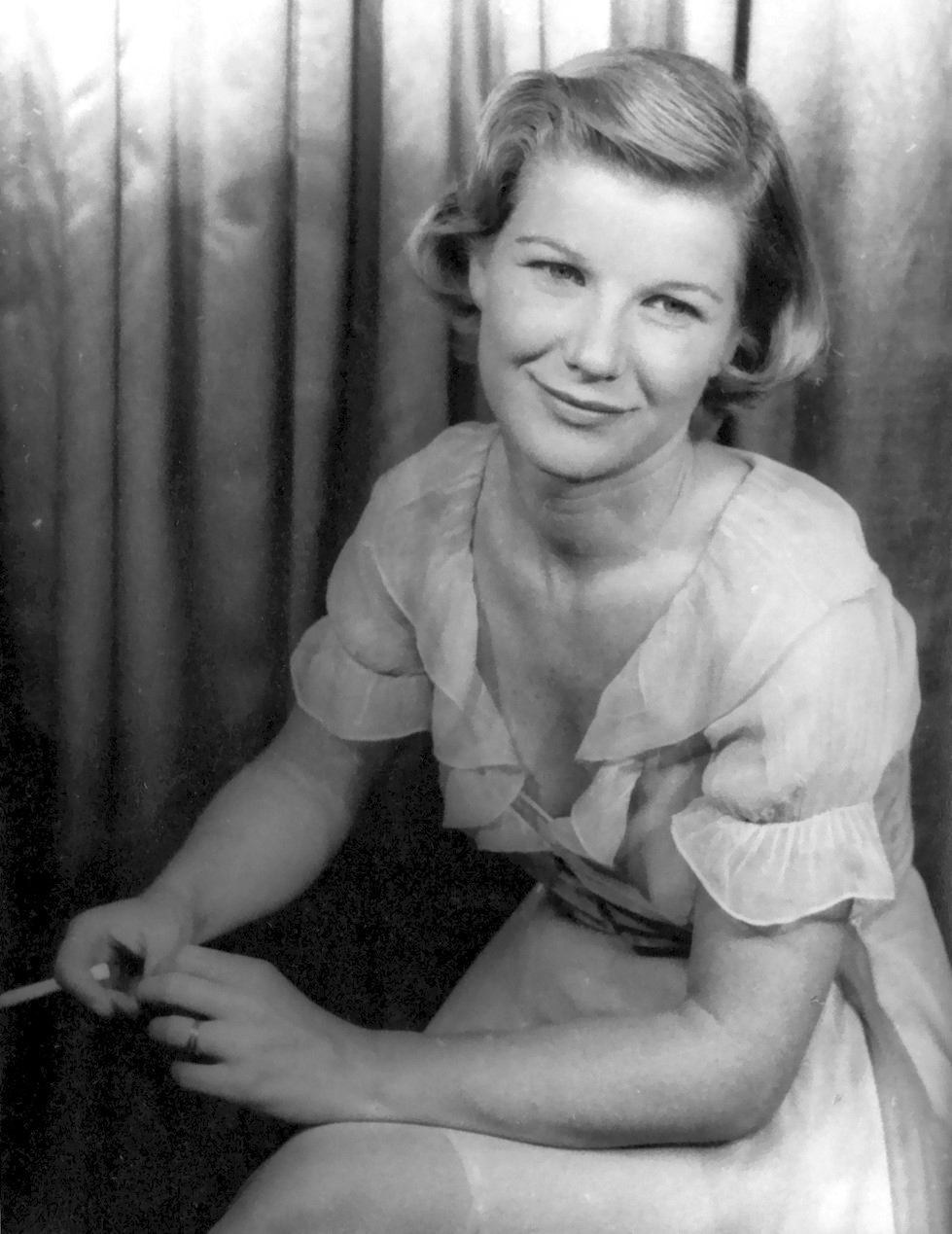
Bel Geddes as Maggie in Cat on a Hot Tin Roof (1955), photographed by Carl van Vechten

=== Broadway ===
Bel Geddes came to prominence in the 1946 Broadway production of Deep Are the Roots. The performance garnered her the Clarence Derwent Award, the Theatre World Award and the Donaldson Award (forerunner of the Tony Awards) presented to her by Laurette Taylor, for "Outstanding Achievement in The Theatre". From 1951 to 1953, Bel Geddes played 924 performances of the F. Hugh Herbert hit comedy The Moon Is Blue. In 1955, she created the role of Maggie "The Cat" in Elia Kazan's original Broadway production of Tennessee Williams' Cat on a Hot Tin Roof, and in 1961 created the title role in the Jean Kerr comedy Mary, Mary which became Broadway's longest-running show with over 1,500 performances. Both roles earned her Tony Award nominations. Other highlights include John Steinbeck's Burning Bright, Edward Albee's Everything in the Garden, and Silent Night, Lonely Night with Henry Fonda. She starred with Michael Redgrave in the Broadway production of The Sleeping Prince. In the film adaptation, retitled The Prince and the Showgirl, the roles were reprised by Marilyn Monroe and Laurence Olivier.

In 1952, she was presented with the prestigious Hasty Pudding Woman of the Year award from America's oldest theater company, Harvard University's Hasty Pudding Theatricals; in 1993, having appeared in 15 Broadway productions, she was inducted into the American Theater Hall of Fame (located in the Gershwin Theatre in New York City), a distinction she shared with her father, stage and industrial designer Norman Bel Geddes.

=== Hollywood ===
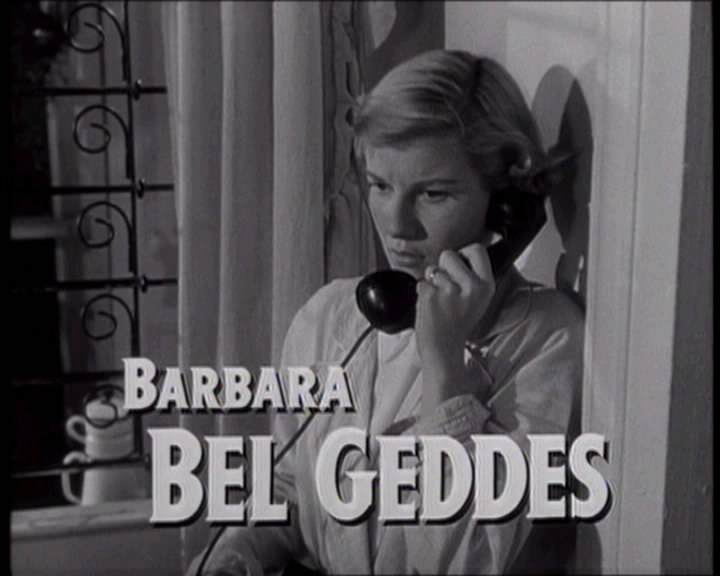
Bel Geddes in Elia Kazan's Panic in the Streets (1950)

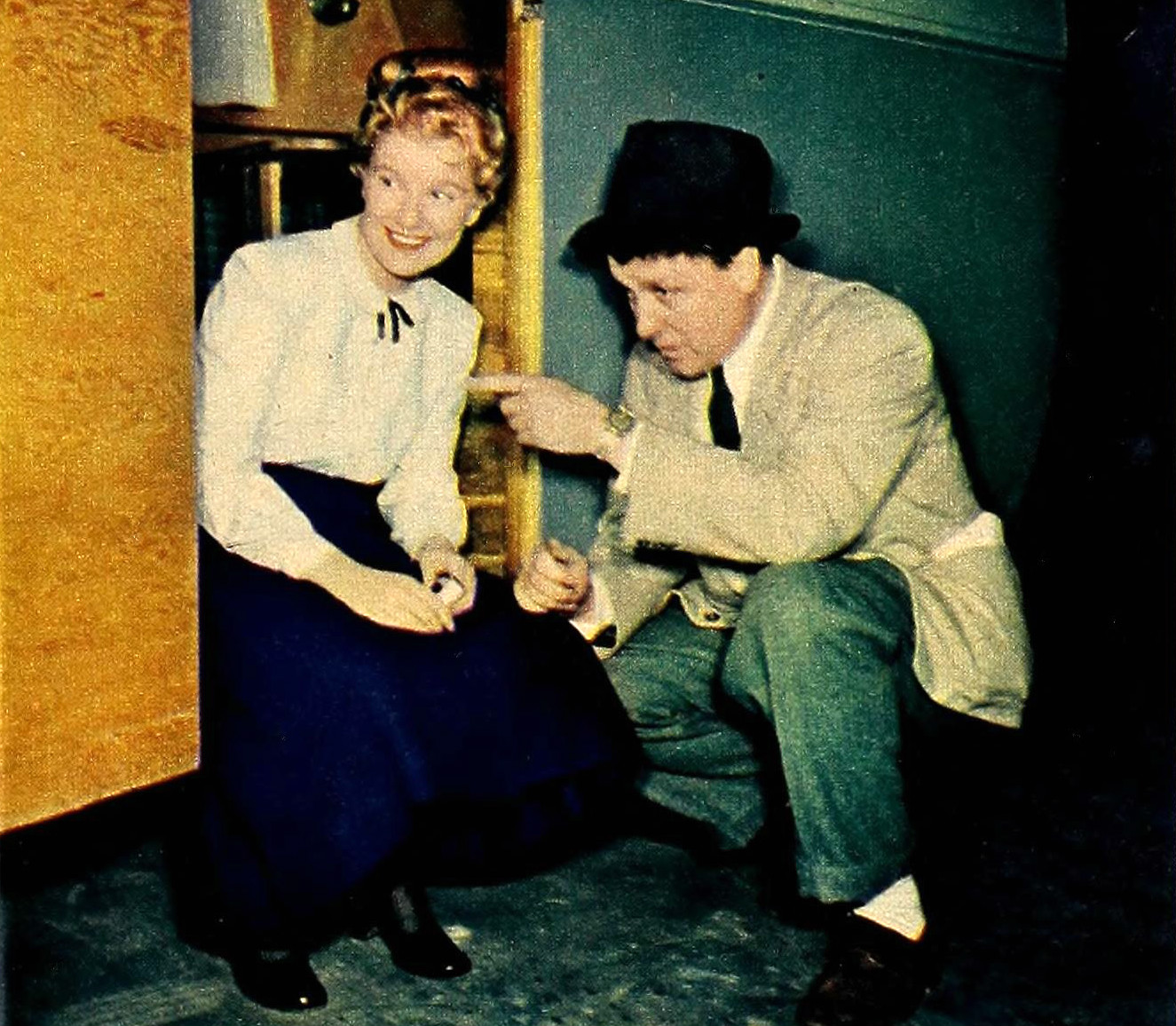
George Stevens with Barbara Bel Geddes on set of I Remember Mama (1948)

Bel Geddes began her film career starring with Henry Fonda in The Long Night (1947), a remake of the 1939 French film Le jour se lève. "I went out to California awfully young", she said. "I remember Lillian Hellman and Elia Kazan telling me,'Don't go, learn your craft.' But I loved films." The following year, she was nominated for an Academy Award for Best Supporting Actress for her performance in the George Stevens film I Remember Mama.

She played Richard Widmark's wife Nancy in Kazan's 1950 film noir Panic in the Streets. In 1958, Alfred Hitchcock cast her with James Stewart in Vertigo as the long-suffering bohemian, Midge. Bel Geddes also starred with Danny Kaye and Louis Armstrong in the screen musical The Five Pennies.

When an investigation from the House Un-American Activities Committee had Bel Geddes's name put on the Hollywood blacklist during the 1950s, it stalled her film career for a time, and she carried on with her acting on Broadway and an occasional part on television. Bel Geddes found new opportunity in television when she was cast in four episodes of Alfred Hitchcock Presents, including "Lamb to the Slaughter", in which she played a housewife who killed her husband by bludgeoning him to death with a frozen leg of lamb, cooking the murder weapon, and then serving it to the investigating police. She appeared in series such as Playhouse 90, CBS Playhouse, Riverboat, Dr. Kildare, and Death Valley Days. In 1977, she starred in the highly acclaimed production of the Thornton Wilder classic Our Town with Hal Holbrook.

=== Dallas ===
Bel Geddes as Miss Ellie Ewing in the television series Dallas

In 1978, Bel Geddes was the first actor signed to star in Dallas. The role of the family matriarch, Miss Ellie Ewing, brought her renewed international recognition. She appeared in many episodes, in almost every season of the series, for a total of 276 episodes from 1978 to 1990 (she was absent from the 1984–85 and 1990–91 seasons) and was its only cast member to win the Emmy Award (Primetime Emmy Award for Outstanding Lead Actress - Drama Series) and the Golden Globe (List of Golden Globe Awards: Television, Best Actress, Drama). In 1985, she also received Germany's Golden Camera Award.

Larry Hagman (who was only nine years junior to Bel Geddes), who played J. R. Ewing, told the Associated Press: "She was the rock of Dallas. She was just a really nice woman and a wonderful actress. She was kind of the glue that held the whole thing together." In a later interview for the website "Ultimate Dallas", Hagman said, "The reason I took the show, they said Barbara Bel Geddes is going to play your mother, and I said, 'Well, that's a touch of class, you know,' so of course I wanted to work with her."

In 1971, Bel Geddes underwent a radical mastectomy, which was an experience that she relived while playing Miss Ellie in the 1979–1980 season of Dallas. The performance garnered her the Emmy Award. She was also honored by First Lady Betty Ford for helping to raise breast cancer awareness.

On March 15, 1983, only days after she had completed filming for the 1982–1983 season, Bel Geddes narrowly avoided a heart attack when her doctor discovered a condition that required emergency quadruple bypass surgery. She subsequently missed the first 11 episodes of the 1983–1984 season and in a controversial decision, was replaced with actress Donna Reed for the 1984–1985 season. With her health improved, CBS-TV persuaded Lorimar Productions to return Bel Geddes to the role of Miss Ellie for the 1985–1986 season. Following Reed's firing, she sued for breach of contract, later settling out of court for over $1 million. As the only primetime television actor to relinquish and later regain a role, Bel Geddes continued to play the part through the penultimate season of Dallas in 1990.

== Life after Dallas ==
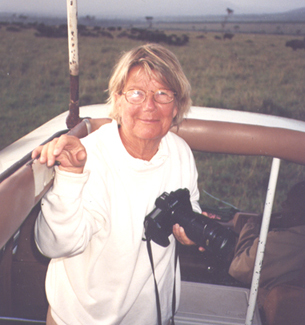
Barbara Bel Geddes in 1994, on Safari

Bel Geddes retired from acting in 1990 and settled in her homes in Northeast Harbor, Maine, and Putnam Valley, New York, where she continued to work as an artist. She was the author of two children's books, I Like to Be Me and So Do I, as well as the creator of a popular line of greeting cards. Looking back on her career, Bel Geddes told People: "They're always making me play well-bred ladies. I'm not very well bred, and I'm not much of a lady."

Bel Geddes died on August 8, 2005, at her estate in Northeast Harbor, Maine, at the age of 82 and her ashes were scattered from a simple wooden boat into the harbor waters bordering her estate. While filming the revival of Dallas in 2012, Patrick Duffy (who played her youngest son, Bobby, in the original series) said: "Barbara is a big piece of our history, and it's important to me to honor her." "Through the whole first season, I don't think an episode goes by that Mama is not mentioned in reference to Southfork and the land", he said.

== Credits ==
=== Broadway ===
| Start of run | End of run | Title | Role | Notes |
|---|---|---|---|---|
| February 11, 1941 | May 10, 1941 | Out of the Frying Pan | Dottie Coburn | |
| October 27, 1942 | November 14, 1942 | Little Darling | Cynthia Brown | |
| January 13, 1943 | January 16, 1943 | Nine Girls | Alice | |
| March 31, 1944 | May 6, 1944 | Mrs. January and Mr. X | Wilhelmina | |
| September 26, 1945 | November 16, 1946 | Deep Are the Roots | Genevra Langdon | Winner – Donaldson Award, Theatre World Award, Clarence Derwent Award |
| October 18, 1950 | October 28, 1950 | Burning Bright | Mordeen | |
| March 8, 1951 | May 30, 1953 | The Moon Is Blue | Patty O'Neill | |
| November 17, 1954 | December 4, 1954 | The Living Room | Rose Pemberton | |
| March 24, 1955 | November 17, 1956 | Cat on a Hot Tin Roof | Maggie | |
| November 1, 1956 | December 22, 1956 | The Sleeping Prince | Marchy | |
| December 3, 1959 | March 19, 1960 | Silent Night, Lonely Night | Katherine | |
| March 8, 1961 | December 12, 1964 | Mary, Mary | Mary McKellaway | |
| November 11, 1964 | January 7, 1967 | Luv | Ellen Manville | |
| November 29, 1967 | February 10, 1968 | Everything in the Garden | Jenny | |
| February 8, 1973 | June 30, 1973 | Finishing Touches | Katy Cooper | |

=== Film ===
| Year | Title | Role |
|---|---|---|
| 1947 | The Long Night | Jo Ann |
| 1948 | I Remember Mama | Katrin Hanson |
| 1948 | Blood on the Moon | Amy Lufton |
| 1949 | Caught | Leonora Eames |
| 1950 | Panic in the Streets | Nancy Reed |
| 1951 | Fourteen Hours | Virginia Foster |
| 1958 | Vertigo | Marjorie "Midge" Wood |
| 1959 | The Five Pennies | Willa Stutsman |
| 1960 | Five Branded Women | Marja |
| 1961 | By Love Possessed | Clarissa Winner |
| 1971 | Summertree | Ruth |
| 1971 | The Todd Killings | Mrs. Todd |

=== Television ===
| Year | Title | Role | Notes |
|---|---|---|---|
| 1950 | Robert Montgomery Presents | Rebecca de Winter / Tracy Samantha Lord | 2 episodes |
| 1950 | Pulitzer Prize Playhouse | Bethel Merriday | 1 episode: "Bethel Merriday" |
| 1950 | The Nash Airflyte Theater | Molly Morgan | 1 episode: "Molly Morgan" |
| 1954 | The Campbell Playhouse | Amanda | 1 episode: "XXXXX Isn't Everything" |
| 1957 | Schlitz Playhouse of Stars | Marcia | 2 episodes |
| 1957–1958 | Studio One | Charlotte Lamb | 2 episodes |
| 1958 | Playhouse 90 | Sidney Cantrell | 1 episode: "Rumors of Evening" |
| 1958 | Decision | Marcia | 1 episode: "Fifty Beautiful Girls" |
| 1958 | The United States Steel Hour | Lily Barton | 1 episode: "Mid-Summer" |
| 1958 | Alfred Hitchcock Presents | Lucia Clay | Season 3 Episode 24: "The Foghorn" |
| 1958 | Alfred Hitchcock Presents | Mary Maloney | Season 3 Episode 28: "Lamb to the Slaughter" |
| 1959 | Riverboat | Missy Belle | 1 episode: "Payment in Full" |
| 1959 | Alfred Hitchcock Presents | Helen Brewster | Season 4 Episode 19: "The Morning of the Bride" |
| 1960 | Dow Hour of Great Mysteries | Marie Stevens | 1 episode: "The Burning Court" |
| 1960 | Alfred Hitchcock Presents | Sybilla Meade | Season 6 Episode 10: "Sybilla" |
| 1965 | Dr. Kildare | Dr. Ruth Halliman | 1 episode: "A Miracle for Margaret" |
| 1968 | CBS Playhouse | Doris Gray | 1 episode: "Secrets" |
| 1969 | Journey to the Unknown | Inga Madison | 1 episode: "The Madison Equation" |
| 1969 | Daniel Boone | Molly Malone | 1 episode: "Sweet Molly Malone" |
| 1976 | Spencer's Pilots | Maggie | 1 episode: "The Search" |
| 1977 | Our Town | Mrs. Webb | TV movie |
| 1978–1984, 1985–1990 | Dallas | Miss Ellie Ewing Farlow | 281 episodes Goldene Kamera for Best actress on television (1985); Soap Opera Digest Awards for Outstanding Actress in a Mature Role in a Prime Time Soap Opera (1984); Nominated – Soap Opera Digest Awards for Outstanding Actress in a Mature Role on a Prime Time Serial (1986, 1988), (final appearance) |

== Accolades ==
| Award | Year | Category | Nominated work | Result |
|---|---|---|---|---|
| Academy Awards | 1949 | Best Supporting Actress | I Remember Mama | Nominated |
| Primetime Emmy Awards | 1979 | Outstanding Lead Actress in a Drama Series | Dallas | Nominated |
| Primetime Emmy Awards | 1980 | Outstanding Lead Actress in a Drama Series | Dallas | Won |
| Primetime Emmy Awards | 1981 | Outstanding Lead Actress in a Drama Series | Dallas | Nominated |
| Golden Globe Awards | 1979 | Best Actress – Television Series Drama | Dallas | Nominated |
| Golden Globe Awards | 1980 | Best Actress – Television Series Drama | Dallas | Nominated |
| Golden Globe Awards | 1981 | Best Actress – Television Series Drama | Dallas | Won |
| Tony Awards | 1956 | Best Actress in a Play | Cat on a Hot Tin Roof | Nominated |
| Tony Awards | 1961 | Best Actress in a Play | Mary, Mary | Nominated |
