= Willard "Digger" Barnes =

- Dallas character
- Portrayed by: David Wayne (1978); Keenan Wynn (1979–80); David Marshall Grant (1986)
- Duration: 1978–80, 1986
- First appearance: April 2, 1978; Digger's Daughter
- Last appearance: February 29, 1980; Jock's Trial: Part II
- Created by: David Jacobs
- Spin-off appearances: Dallas: The Early Years
In-universe information
- Family: Barnes
- Father: Henry Barnes
- Sisters: Maggie Barnes Monahan
- Spouse: Rebecca Barnes (1946–?)
- Sons: Tyler Barnes; Cliff Barnes
- Daughters: Catherine Barnes; Pamela Barnes Ewing (legal)
- Grandchildren: Christopher Ewing (adoptive); Pamela Rebecca Barnes
- Nieces and nephews: Jimmy Monahan
- First cousins: Rose

Willard "Digger" Barnes is a character in the popular American television series Dallas created by David Jacobs. Digger was played by actors David Wayne and Keenan Wynn in the show's first three seasons from 1978 to 1980, and as a young man by David Marshall Grant in the made-for-TV movie prequel The Early Years in 1986. As the patriarch of the Barnes family, Digger was the father of Cliff Barnes and step-father of Pam Ewing. Digger shocked Pamela on his deathbed by revealing that Hutch McKinney was her father but that he had always loved her as though she were his own.

== Character biography ==
Willard Barnes' father, Henry Barnes, was best friends with Aaron Southworth, the father of Miss Ellie Southworth. Henry saved Aaron's life, so he took care of young Willard throughout much of his adolescence. Willard first started dating Miss Ellie in 1930, when she was fifteen years old. However, after being caught with Miss Ellie by her brother, Garrison, Willard decided to try his fortune at wildcatting. As a result, he met Jock Ewing while riding in a train boxcar on the way to the oil fields, and the two became friends. Willard, Jock, and Jock's brother Jason all became wildcatters and began drilling their own fields. Willard had a unique ability to smell oil underground, earning him the nickname "Digger", which over time became the name that people used more and more (even his children would sometimes call him "Digger", in addition to "Daddy"), eventually getting to the point where virtually nobody called him "Willard" anymore.

Digger's brilliant ability to sniff oil, combined with Jock's brilliant business skills, enabled them to start making a fortune. Digger and Jason had a lot of disagreements and did not get on, but Jock would always stand up for Digger at this time. Jason soon left Texas to wildcat in Alaska, where he married a woman named Nancy Shaw, and fathered two children, a son named Jack and a daughter named Jamie. Jock and Digger returned to Dallas where they started, and they soon became rivals over Ellie. Digger's love for Miss Ellie had only grown since their initial brief romance in 1930, but Digger's drinking, gambling and undependability eventually made Miss Ellie see that Digger would never change and that he was not the type of man to marry. Jock and Ellie became a couple in the fall of 1935, and Jock married a pregnant Miss Ellie in 1936, putting the first serious dent in Jock and Digger's friendship.

Digger wandered across the country for years after he lost Ellie to Jock, although he still did business deals with Jock regarding their oil ventures for a few more years. Even as late as 1939, Jock and Digger both signed a deal to share the profits of Ewing 23 between themselves and their heirs in perpetuity. However, when Ewing 6 came in, Jock put the field in his name only, to prevent Digger from gambling and drinking his half away. Digger was furious and he claimed that Jock had stolen the wells for himself, ending their friendship and business relationship. While Digger was known for his liking of alcohol even when he was still on good terms with Jock, it was in the years following his fallout with Jock that Digger's wandering and drinking worsened considerably, causing the alcoholic troubles that would end his life many decades later, although he would have some periods of sobriety in between.

After World War II, Digger married a teenager named Rebecca Blake, with whom he had four children: Tyler, Cliff, Catherine and Pamela. Tyler and Catherine both died in infancy. It was a mostly troubled marriage, due to Digger's bitterness at the Ewings, his heavy drinking, and the pain caused by the deaths of Tyler and Catherine. Digger and Rebecca divorced shortly afterwards. Digger became a single father who raised Cliff and Pam with the help of his sister, Maggie.

In 1979, after a dizzy spell, Cliff took Digger to the doctor, and Digger was diagnosed with neurofibromatosis, an inherited genetic condition that is passed down from parent to child, and is a potentially deadly risk, to young babies in particular. The neurofibromatosis was very likely responsible for the premature deaths of Tyler and Catherine, both of whom died before they reached their first birthday. At the time of the diagnosis, there was a strong possibility that Cliff was the biological father of baby John Ross, who was the son of J. R.'s wife, Sue Ellen, and there were fears for the health of John Ross from Cliff, who wanted to talk to Sue Ellen. At Pam's urging, they decided not to say anything, to discreetly take John Ross for tests, and to keep a close eye on the situation. Despite the probability odds, tests later confirmed that J. R. was the biological father of baby John Ross, rather than Cliff.

It was also later revealed that Digger was not Pam's biological father as a man named Hutch McKinney had been having an affair with Rebecca. Digger revealed that he discovered his pregnant wife together with Hutch McKinney on the night after Hutch had been fired from Southfork by Jock in 1952, after Digger had been out drinking. A confrontation followed where Rebecca stated that she and Cliff were leaving Digger to move away with Hutch, and that Hutch was the father of her unborn baby. An angry Digger punched Hutch and Hutch pulled a pistol on Digger, the gun being Jock's, which Hutch had stolen that night before he left Southfork. This then resulted in Rebecca taking Hutch by surprise, disarming him, and Digger picking up the gun and shooting Hutch dead in a temper. Digger then buried Hutch's body and disposed of the stolen gun on a section of Southfork land, where they remained undiscovered for over twenty-five years. Rebecca gave birth to Hutch's biological daughter, Pamela, and both she and Digger passed the child off as Digger's own daughter, with Digger becoming Pam's legal father. Early in Pam's life, Rebecca left Digger, leaving Cliff and Pam behind. Pam and Cliff were both raised by Digger and Digger's sister, Maggie. When Rebecca left her husband and kids behind, she left in such a way that Digger believed that she was dead.

After the body and the gun were found and a witness, Murdo Ferris, came forward and said that he had seen Jock and Hutch get into a fight at a bar in 1952 and heard Jock order Hutch to leave Southfork by morning or he was going to kill him, Jock was indicted for murdering Hutch McKinney. Due to his longstanding love for Miss Ellie, and not wanting to devastate her life, as would be the case if Jock were sent to prison, Digger made a deathbed confession that he had murdered Hutch. Digger died of alcohol poisoning in 1980, after decades of mostly heavy drinking. Jock claimed that he never cheated Digger out of a fortune but had taken control of the company, because Digger would have squandered any profit. The feud between the Ewing and Barnes families never ended after Digger's death, and continued with J. R. and Cliff throughout the series.

== Dallas (2012 TV series) ==
In the episode "Let Me In", his name was seen written on the will of his wife. Cliff would mention his name in "Love & Family", saying he would finally gain control of what had been stolen from Digger Barnes.

Despite obtaining Ewing Oil at the end of the original series, Cliff did not let the feud drop and in 2013 his prime goal was taking down the Ewings and getting hold of their new company Ewing Energies, still feeling that Digger and the Barnes were cheated. This feud ended when Cliff was implicated in the murder of J.R. Ewing and sent to a Mexican prison. Although his daughter Pamela (Digger's granddaughter) discovered Cliff was innocent of J.R.'s murder, she left him in prison for indirectly killing her unborn children on a rig explosion, but gave Cliff the deeds to Digger's deserved land, only at the expense of not being able to enjoy it. Overall though, Pamela decided to continue on the Barnes-Ewing feud, being the third generation.
