= Miss Ellie Ewing =

Fictional character from the television series Dallas

Miss Ellie Ewing Farlow
- Dallas character
- Barbara Bel Geddes as Miss Ellie Ewing
- Portrayed by: Barbara Bel Geddes (1978–1984, 1985–1990); Donna Reed (1984–1985); Molly Hagan (1986)
- Duration: 1978–1990
- First appearance: April 2, 1978; Digger's Daughter
- Last appearance: April 27, 1990; The Southfork Wedding Jinx
- Created by: David Jacobs
- Spin-off appearances: Dallas: The Early Years
- Donna Reed as Miss Ellie Ewing Farlow
In-universe information
- Occupation: Socialite; Shareholder in Ewing Oil; Southfork Ranch Co-Owner (1938–1982, 1988–1991); Southfork Ranch Owner (1982–1988)
- Family: Southworth (by birth); 1. Ewing (by marriage); 2. Farlow (by marriage)
- Father: Aaron Southworth
- Mother: Barbara Southworth
- Brothers: Garrison Southworth
- Husband: Jock Ewing (1936–1982); Clayton Farlow (1984–1999)
- Sons: J.R. Ewing; Gary Ewing; Bobby Ewing
- Stepchildren: Ray Krebbs; Steven "Dusty" Farlow
- Grandsons: James Beaumont; John Ross Ewing III; Christopher Ewing (adoptive); Bobby Ewing II; Lucas Krebbs unnamed grandson (J.R.'s child with Cally)
- Granddaughters: Lucy Ewing; Betsy Ewing; Molly Whittaker unnamed granddaughter (J.R.'s daughter with an unknown woman)
- Grandfathers: Enoch Southworth
- Grandmothers: Eleanor Southworth

Eleanor "Miss Ellie" Ewing Farlow (maiden name Southworth) is a fictional character from the primetime CBS television series Dallas, a long-running serial centered on the lives of the wealthy Ewing family of Dallas, Texas. Created by writer David Jacobs, family matriarch Miss Ellie was an important part of the show's structure and conflict and a principal character of the series. Stage and screen actress Barbara Bel Geddes originated the role, and was awarded both the Emmy Award for Outstanding Lead Actress in a Drama Series and the Golden Globe Award for Best Actress in a Television Series Drama.

Halfway through the show's 13-year run, only days after filming wrapped for the 1982–1983 season, Bel Geddes underwent emergency quadruple bypass surgery. Consequently, the character of Miss Ellie went unseen until the 12th episode of the 1983–1984 season when Bel Geddes returned. Facing continued health issues, she was replaced by movie and television actress Donna Reed for the entire 1984–1985 season. When she returned to health, Dallas producers asked Bel Geddes to return to the role again for the 1985–86 season, where she remained through the character's final appearance in the 1989–90 season.

The character of Miss Ellie appeared on Dallas in almost every episode of the series, with the exception of the final season, for a total of 300 episodes, 276 episodes played by Barbara Bel Geddes, and 24 episodes played by Donna Reed.

Miss Ellie's storylines focus on her family's troubles. As the matriarch of the Ewing family, she is portrayed as a strong and loving mother. Miss Ellie's marriage to oil baron Jock Ewing was central to the character for the first few years she appeared in the show, until his death in an episode in 1981, following the real-life death of actor Jim Davis.

== Character creation ==
=== Casting ===
Miss Ellie Ewing Farlow is one of the original characters invented by the creator of Dallas, David Jacobs. Before the creation of the show, Jacobs had quite a different idea of what he envisioned the show to be. He wanted to create a television show based on "family issues and examining relationships at the middle-class level". The production company, CBS, turned down his original idea, as they wanted something more "glitzy" to put on the air, with wealthier characters. After the success of Dallas, Jacobs' initial idea later became the Dallas spin-off Knots Landing.

== Storylines ==
Born in 1915, Miss Ellie Ewing is the daughter of rancher Aaron Southworth, who instills in her a fierce pride in her heritage, deep-seated courage, and a strong belief in the strength of family. She was named after her paternal grandmother. During the first half of the 1930s, Miss Ellie was the sweetheart of Willard "Digger" Barnes. When the Great Depression hit, Miss Ellie's family came dangerously close to losing Southfork Ranch, and Miss Ellie began dating Digger's business partner and friend, Jock Ewing, who had just begun making his fortune in the oil business and building Ewing Oil. On the day that her family was going to lose Southfork, Miss Ellie married Jock, as he was the only man in Texas known to have enough money to save the ranch. While she initially married Jock to save Southfork and for his dependability, Miss Ellie grew to love him and they remained married for well over forty years. Together, Jock and Miss Ellie had three sons: J.R., Gary, and Bobby.

As the years and decades pass, Jock builds Ewing Oil into one of the biggest and most powerful independent oil companies in Texas, and Southfork grew into a very successful ranch again under Jock's leadership. Jock takes over raising J.R., showing him "tough love" and grooming him to be the heir of Ewing Oil, thus making him one of the most ruthless oilmen in the oil business. Miss Ellie has more influence on their second son Gary, who is Miss Ellie's favorite son, as Gary is more like the Southworths than the Ewings in loving ranching and the land over the oil business. Miss Ellie resents Jock's treatment of Gary, whom Jock considers weak, and Gary is regularly bullied by J.R., causing pressures which drive Gary to alcoholism, and to walk out on his family and baby daughter, Lucy. Jock and Miss Ellie's youngest son, Bobby, is Jock's favorite son, and is spoiled by both Jock and Miss Ellie.

In 1979, Miss Ellie is diagnosed with breast cancer and undergoes a mastectomy, from which she fully recovers. The following year, she learns that ranch foreman Ray Krebbs is Jock's illegitimate son from an affair with an Army nurse named Margaret Hunter in England during World War II. This revelation caused tension in Miss Ellie and Jock's marriage, as she felt that Jock had replaced Ray for their second son Gary. The tension almost leads Miss Ellie and Jock to divorce. However, they reconcile in 1981 and have a second honeymoon in Paris. Miss Ellie also accepts Ray into the family, though she is not his biological mother. Shortly thereafter, Jock goes to Venezuela on a mission to help the U.S. government explore oil in the jungle. In 1982, on his return to Texas from Venezuela, Jock is involved in a helicopter crash and is reported to have died, although his body is never recovered.

In 1983, Miss Ellie goes to court to overturn the terms of Jock's will, which set up a fierce and bitter competition between J.R. and Bobby for control of Ewing Oil. Miss Ellie loses the case after failing to convince the court that Jock was mentally incompetent at the time he wrote his will. Before Jock's death, Sue Ellen leaves J.R., taking John Ross to live at the Southern Cross Ranch near San Angelo, Texas, the home of her new boyfriend, rodeo cowboy Dusty Farlow. In an attempt to steal back John Ross, J.R. takes Miss Ellie on a visit, where she first meets Dusty's father Clayton. Later, Clayton and she settle a problem caused by J.R. involving Clayton's refineries. When Clayton helps Sue Ellen as she reconciles with J.R., Miss Ellie and he become friendly and eventually start dating. In 1984, Clayton and Miss Ellie marry, despite the attempts of J.R. and Clayton's sister Lady Jessica Montfort to stop the wedding.

In 1986, a man named Wes Parmalee claims that he is in fact her presumed late husband, Jock, who had actually survived the helicopter crash but underwent extensive plastic surgery which drastically altered his appearance. Miss Ellie is torn over whether to believe Wes' claims, and this puts a strain on her marriage to Clayton. Eventually, Miss Ellie tells her family that Wes told her that he was not Jock. In 1988, Ellie accepted her husband Clayton as co-owner of Southfork Ranch.

In 1990, Miss Ellie and Clayton go on a tour of the Orient. While overseas, Miss Ellie decides not to return to Dallas because she is tired of dealing with all the headaches and heartaches from J.R. and Bobby's lives. She deeds Southfork to her youngest son, Bobby. Miss Ellie died in 2001 and is buried on Southfork.

== Dallas (2012 TV series) ==
When her son J.R. died in 2013, Bobby's new wife Ann revealed that Miss Ellie had cut J.R. out of her will because "he was not a rancher", which greatly angered a bitter J.R., and left Bobby with enormous guilt. A final part of her will gave half of Southfork to her grandson John Ross Ewing III, to Bobby's dislike.
