= List of Knots Landing episodes =

Knots Landing is an American prime time television soap opera that originally aired on CBS from December 27, 1979, to May 13, 1993. A spin-off of Dallas, the show centered on the personal and professional lives of the residents of Seaview Circle, a cul-de-sac in the suburb of Knots Landing, California. Over the 14 seasons, 344 episodes aired, which were followed by a two-part mini-series in 1997 and a non-fiction reunion special in 2005.

== Series overview ==
Season	Episodes	Originally released	
Season	Episodes	First released	Last released
1	13	December 27, 1979	March 27, 1980
2	18	November 20, 1980	March 26, 1981
3	22	November 12, 1981	May 6, 1982
4	22	September 30, 1982	March 10, 1983
5	25	September 29, 1983	March 29, 1984
6	30	October 4, 1984	May 23, 1985
7	30	September 26, 1985	May 15, 1986
8	30	September 18, 1986	May 14, 1987
9	29	September 24, 1987	May 12, 1988
10	28	October 27, 1988	May 18, 1989
11	29	September 28, 1989	May 17, 1990
12	27	September 13, 1990	May 9, 1991
13	22	September 12, 1991	April 9, 1992
14	19	October 29, 1992	May 13, 1993
Miniseries	2	May 7, 1997	May 9, 1997
Specials	2	May 13, 1993	December 2, 2005

== Episodes ==
=== Season 1 (1979–80) ===
No. overall	No. in season	Title	Directed by	Written by	Original release date	Rating/share (households)
1	1	"Pilot"	Peter Levin	David Jacobs	December 27, 1979	20.1/34
Gary (Ted Shackelford) and Valene Ewing (Joan Van Ark) move to Knots Landing, in a new home that Gary's mother, Miss Ellie, bought for them. Once there, they get acquainted with their new neighbors, the Fairgates (Michele Lee and Don Murray), the Averys (Constance McCashin and John Pleshette) and the Wards (Kim Lankford and James Houghton). Sid Fairgate's 18-year-old rebellious daughter, Annie (Karen Allen), from a previous marriage, is visiting the Fairgates and is causing havoc among the family. Val attempts to fix Annie's relationship with her father.
2	2	"Community Spirit"	James Sheldon	Elizabeth Pizer	January 3, 1980	23.3/36
J.R. Ewing (Larry Hagman) is in town planning an offshore drilling project on the beach, which everyone is opposed to, except for Richard who asks Laura to get together with Chip Todson, J.R.'s PR man. He asks her to do this so he can get the account. Karen has an afternoon rendezvous with J.R. so Gary can go to his office to steal an important file he can use against his brother. Along with the rest of the community, Gary protests by picketing on the beach. Danny Gellis replaces Justin Dana in the recurring role of Jason Avery.
3	3	"Let Me Count the Ways"	Henry Levin	William Hopkins	January 10, 1980	20.0/34
Richard is opposed to Diana's favorite teacher, David Crane, for his unorthodox teaching methods. He decides to run against him for a seat on the school board. Meanwhile Karen, who is going through mid-life uncertainty, decides to go to the school to find out more about this teacher, but ends up falling for him and even contemplates having an affair with him.
4	4	"The Lie"	Edward Parone	Claudia Adams	January 17, 1980	19.3/31
Laura is feeling unappreciated, so she goes to a cocktail lounge in the middle of the afternoon and meets an artist. The artist buys her a drink, then invites her to his studio to do a portrait of her as a ruse to rape her. She hides the truth from Richard by saying a serial rapist that is on the loose in Knots Landing just had raped her at home before Richard got home. Val knows that this is not the case, and as she goes down to the police station to identify her attacker; the police end up arresting the wrong man.
5	5	"Will the Circle Be Unbroken"	David Moessinger	David Jacobs	January 25, 1980	23.7/40
Lilimae Clements, Val's mother, turns up in Knots Landing where they put their troubled past to rest. First appearance of Lilimae Clements (special guest star Julie Harris).
6	6	"Home is for Healing"	Roger Young	Rena Down	January 31, 1980	20.3/34
Lucy Ewing (Charlene Tilton) reunites with her parents, Gary and Val.
7	7	"Land of the Free"	Nicholas Sgarro	Clyde Ware	February 7, 1980	22.4/37
Diana gets kidnapped by a motor-cycle gang, who are causing trouble in the neighborhood.
8	8	"Civil Wives"	Kim Friedman	Jack Turley	February 14, 1980	20.4/34
Sid's ex-wife, Susan, comes to the cul-de-sac where her motives are questioned by Sid and Karen.
9	9	"The Constant Companion"	Henry Levin	Robert Gilmer	February 21, 1980	15.9/25
Ginger receives gifts from an anonymous person and later discovers the sender is the mother of her ex-boyfriend, who got her pregnant when she was 16.
10	10	"Small Surprises"	Nicholas Sgarro	Robert Gilmer	March 6, 1980	19.1/32
Karen discovers she is pregnant but has mixed feelings about it.
11	11	"Courageous Convictions"	Henry Levin	Rogers Turrentine & Robert Gilmer	March 13, 1980	17.5/28
Laura wishes to get a job after she learns of Richard's financial troubles.
12	12	"Bottom of the Bottle – Part 1"	Roger Young	Calvin Clements, Jr	March 20, 1980	19.2/33
Gary's alcoholism resurfaces after he celebrates his promotion at Knots Landing Motors. Ginger believes Kenny is having an affair.
13	13	"Bottom of the Bottle – Part 2"	Roger Young	John Pleshette	March 27, 1980	18.7/32
After Gary becomes violent during his drunken state, Val admits him into a detox ward. This episode marks the end of Knots Landing as a strictly episodic series. Starting in season two, Knots adopts a hybrid format as both episodic and serialized which becomes completely serialized by the end of the season three.

=== Season 2 (1980–81) ===
No. overall	No. in season	Title	Directed by	Written by	Original release date	Rating/share (households)
14	1	"Hitchhike – Part 1"	Edward Parone	Don Murray	November 20, 1980	17.2/28
Sid is accused of rape by a hitchhiker and Sid's sister Abby Cunningham arrives in Knots Landing. Donna Mills (Abby Cunningham) is added to the opening credits. First appearances of Abby, Olivia and Brian Cunningham (recurring guest stars Tonya Crowe and Bobby Jacoby).
15	2	"Hitchhike – Part 2"	Edward Parone	Don Murray	November 27, 1980	16.6/30
Sid fires Richard as his attorney and Karen helps clear his name. Abby decides to stay in Knots Landing and moves into a house on Seaview Circle.
16	3	"Remember the Good Times"	James Sheldon	Diana Gould	December 4, 1980	12.5/20
Gary meets Judy Trent who wants his help in getting her husband support from AA. Abby begins to show her manipulative nature by taking advantage of Eric and tries to seduce Kenny. Karen confronts her.
17	4	"Chance of a Lifetime"	Nicholas Sgarro	John Pleshette	December 11, 1980	16.6/28
Richard quits his job at his law firm hoping he will be hired by another while Laura is blossoming at her job in real estate. Val starts college and Gary makes a deal with Orchid Cab Co.
18	5	"Kristin"	Nicholas Sgarro	Diana Gould	December 18, 1980	19.5/33
Kristin Shepard (Mary Crosby) is in town after shooting J.R. Ewing in Dallas. She stays with Gary and Val and reveals she is pregnant. Kristin also seduces Kenny, claiming that she wanted a father for her unborn child.
19	6	"Step One"	Kim Friedman	Lorraine Despres	January 1, 1981	21.5/32
Abby has a fling with Richard. Diana feels pressured by her boyfriend to sleep with him.
20	7	"Breach of Faith"	Harvey Laidman	William Hopkins	January 8, 1981	19.5/32
Gary and Judy Trent begin an affair. Ginger discovers she is pregnant.
21	8	"Scapegoats"	Gabrielle Beaumont	Tim Maschler	January 15, 1981	18.5/31
Abby becomes bookkeeper at Knots Landing Motors. Karen and Sid are concerned with Michael's behavior issues. Gary receives threats from Orchid Cab Co. and is ordered to pay them $50,000. Abby suggests that Gary ask J.R. for the money.
22	9	"A Family Matter"	Edward Parone	David Paulsen	January 22, 1981	19.3/31
J.R. is in town and when Gary refuses to ask him for the $50,000, Abby goes to J.R. to obtain the money by sleeping with him. However, J.R. will only give Gary the money if he asks for it himself, so Abby keeps trying to persuade Gary. Val asks Gary not to get in any deals with J.R., and she and J.R. have a nasty confrontation. Orchid Cab Co. continue to pressure Gary, so he finally goes to J.R., who gives him the $50,000.
23	10	"Choices"	Kim Freidman	L. Virginia Brown	January 29, 1981	20.4/30
Abby takes her scheming to a new level as she manipulates a situation which results in Val doubting Gary. Judy and Abby fight for Gary. Judy tells Val she and Gary are having an affair and are in love. Val confronts Gary but they make up. Later, Abby asks Gary, "Are you ready for me now?
24	11	"A State of Mind"	Alexander Singer	Robert Gilmer	February 5, 1981	18.4/32
Abby's ex-husband Jeff comes to the Cul-de-sac where he tells his wife to end her affair with Richard. After Karen infers to Jeff that Abby may be having an affair with Richard, Abby warns that she will become a problem for Karen if Karen does not keep quiet.
25	12	"Players"	Jeff Bleckner	Susan Misty Stewart	February 12, 1981	18.4/30
Ginger finally tells Kenny she is pregnant but they must sort their differences before he can return home. Karen warns Sid that he is falling into a trap.
26	13	"The Loudest Word"	Kim Friedman	Joseph B. Wallenstein	February 19, 1981	22.3/37
Val is told she has a malignant growth in her colon and needs an operation. Gary feels guilty about how he is treated Val and totally breaks down. Bobby (Patrick Duffy) comes to support him while Val's in the hospital. The doctor is able to remove all of the cancer.
27	14	"Moments of Truth"	Jeff Bleckner	Robert Gilmer	February 26, 1981	21.5/35
Ginger has a baby shower at Val’s, but three robbers hold them all hostage. Abby seduces one of the criminals and Diana escapes and calls the police.
28	15	"Man of the Hour"	Harvey Laidman	Sara Ann Freidman	March 12, 1981	20.0/35
Jeff takes Olivia and Brian camping without informing Abby, who believes Jeff has kidnapped them. Ginger's sister takes some marijuana laced with Angel Dust and goes into a coma while she is with Eric (who gets caught with the drugs).
29	16	"More Than Friends"	Alexander Singer	Carol Roper	March 19, 1981	18.9/34
Abby comes onto Gary. Everyone believes Laura is having an affair with Scooter and Earl Trent asks Val to sleep with him.
30	17	"Designs"	Nicholas Sgarro	Diana Gould & Robert Gilmer	March 26, 1981	20.4/32
J.R. is in town and wishes to patent an engine Sid invented. When Sid refuses, Abby steals the engine plans and gives them to J.R.
31	18	"Squeezeplay"	Joseph B. Wallenstein	John Pleshette	March 26, 1981	20.4/34
Jeff kidnaps Abby's children. The Orchid Cab Co. come back to haunt Gary and Sid and cut the brakes on Sid's car which goes over a cliff.

=== Season 3 (1981–82) ===
No. overall	No. in season	Title	Directed by	Written by	Original release date	Rating/share (households)
32	1	"The Vigil"	Jeff Bleckner	John Pleshette	November 12, 1981	18.8/29
Sid survives the car crash but goes into a coma. Gary is apologetic to Karen but she will not listen.
33	2	"Critical Condition"	Nicholas Sgarro	Diana Gould	November 19, 1981	17.7/29
Sid has a blood clot which will permanently paralyze him unless he is operated on. However, there is a 40% chance the operation could kill him. Karen does not want him to get the operation, but Sid insists and makes Karen sign his consent form. Sid tells his family how much he loves them and later dies on the operating table. Final appearance of Sid Fairgate (Don Murray), he is removed from the opening credits in the following episode.
34	3	"Aftermath"	Kim Friedman	Ann Marcus, Ellis Marcus & Diana Gould	November 26, 1981	15.6/28
The aftermath of Sid's death takes its toll on the Fairgates. Kenny and Ginger celebrate the birth of their child.
35	4	"Moving In"	Joseph B. Wallenstein	Ann Marcus	December 3, 1981	18.3/28
Abby tries to find her children and Lilimae returns to Knots Landing. Julie Harris returns in a regular role from this episode, although she is not added to the opening credits until the next season.
36	5	"The Surprise"	Joseph Manduke	Ellis Marcus	December 10, 1981	16.1/25
Abby's children are returned to her after she tricks Jeff and she gets a restraining order against him.
37	6	"One of a Kind"	Kim Friedman	Sara Ann Friedman	December 17, 1981	17.5/27
Karen's former boyfriend, Teddy Becker, visits Knots Landing and believes he is Diana's real father. Val and Lilimae bond after bad memories resurface.
38	7	"Secrets"	Gabrielle Beaumont	John Pleshette	December 24, 1981	12.2/29
Laura believes that Richard is having an affair when he starts to go to client parties so she goes on a trip to Santa Barbara with Scooter out of spite. Knots Landing Motors is being audited and Karen has no choice but to ask Abby to come back to work.
39	8	"Mistaken Motives"	Jeff Bleckner	Rocci Chatfield and Ray Goldstone	January 7, 1982	20.8/31
Diana misinterprets Karen's friendship with Bill and out of spite she goes to a party with a biker friend whom Karen hates. Kenny and Ginger deal with some of the challenges of being new parents. David Ackroyd, who plays Karen's love interest, played the original Gary Ewing in Dallas.
40	9	"The Rose and the Briar"	Ernest Pintoff	Scott Hamner	January 14, 1982	22.5/32
Lilimae meets a con man who wrongly believes she is rich. He takes her to Las Vegas hoping to marry her but when he discovers she is poor, he confesses all. Val begins to realize that Abby may be a threat.
41	10	"The Three Sisters"	Kim Friedman	Daniel J. Franklin	January 21, 1982	18.0/28
The women of the Cul-de-sac get stranded at a supposed haunted house where they must spend the night.
42	11	"Power Play"	Bill Duke	James Bonnet	January 28, 1982	17.5/27
Gary and Abby invest in a company which make methanol cars. Gary mortgages the house behind Val's back. While in Mexico, Gary and Abby have their first kiss, while Val is left home upset by the recent revelations.
43	12	"Possibilities"	Nicholas Sgarro	James and Mona Houghton	February 11, 1982	17.4/27
Richard and Laura set Karen up on her first date but she does not like the man. Ginger wants a career. Kenny is apprehensive.
44	13	"Reunion"	Joseph B. Wallenstein	Diana Gould	February 18, 1982	16.5/26
Karen's college friend Victoria Hill visits and organizes a fashion show which the women of the Cul-de-sac help out with. Laura discovers she is pregnant.
45	14	"Cricket"	Nicholas Sgarro	Ann Marcus	March 4, 1982	18.2/27
Karen's brother Joe Cooper comes to stay. Val looks after a girl named Cricket, the stepdaughter of a friend who has abandoned her.
46	15	"Best Intentions"	Randa Haines	James and Mona Houghton	March 11, 1982	16.5/26
Val writes a journal about the Ewings of Dallas for an assignment and it ends up getting published without her knowledge. Laura leaves Richard.
47	16	"Silver Shadows"	Nicholas Sgarro	Ray Goldstone & Rocci Chatfield	March 25, 1982	14.2/24
Abby informs Gary that they need $20,000 to keep their methanol company going. She meets a wealthy old man who may be the solution to her problems.
48	17	"Letting Go"	Alexander Singer	Sara Ann Friedman	April 1, 1982	13.2/23
Abby, Gary and Val go to Sacramento to meet a senator about making methanol legal or their business will fail. Abby sleeps with the senator to get the bill passed. Karen makes an emotional decision. Don Murray returns briefly as Sid in new footage as Karen and the family watch old home videos.
49	18	"Exposé"	Harvey Laidman	L. Virginia Brown	April 8, 1982	14.9/26
Val's book about the Ewings is published, but Gary is angry because it is about his family's scandals. Gary and Abby get closer. Richard's job takes a toll on him.
50	19	"Night"	Alexander Singer	John Pleshette	April 15, 1982	16.2/29
Richard suffers a nervous breakdown and holds Laura at gunpoint in a night-long siege.
51	20	"Acts of Love"	Harvey Laidman	Jeff Cohn	April 22, 1982	15.8/28
While Val and Olivia get swept up in an unexpected adventure, Gary and Abby sleep together for the first time. Karen provides support to Richard and tries to convince Laura to do the same.
52	21	"China Dolls"	Joseph B. Wallenstein	Joseph B. Wallenstein	April 29, 1982	15.4/28
Abby and Gary continue their affair until his own guilt forces him to end it. However, Val is already suspicious and confronts Abby. Originally titled "Obsession" before being changed prior to production.
53	22	"Living Dangerously"	Lorraine Senna Ferrara	Ellis Marcus	May 6, 1982	16.0/28
Laura moves back in with Richard after finding his suicide note. Karen and Lilimae spot Gary and Abby together. Karen later catches them in the act and confronts them but then Val walks in on them and leaves Gary.

=== Season 4 (1982–83) ===
No. overall	No. in season	Title	Directed by	Written by	Original release date	Rating/share (households)
54	1	"A Brand New Day"	Nicholas Sgarro	John Pleshette	September 30, 1982	16.1/27
Karen meets Mack MacKenzie after barging into the Federal Prosecutor's office, where he is handling Sid's case. Gary tries to talk to Val following their split and Abby sends J.R. chapters from Val's book "Capricorn Crude". Kevin Dobson (Marion Patrick "Mack" MacKenzie) and Julie Harris (Lillimae) are added to the opening credits.
55	2	"Daniel"	Joseph B. Wallenstein	John Pleshette	October 7, 1982	16.8/27
Mack learns that Karen is using court transcripts to go after Sid's killers herself. Laura gives birth to a boy and calls him Daniel. J.R. buys the publishing company behind Val's book and he is also questioned by Abby about Gary's future inheritance from Jock. Danny Ponce replaces Danny Gellis in the recurring role of Jason Avery.
56	3	"Encounters"	Alexander Singer	James and Mona Houghton	October 14, 1982	16.9/28
Gary wants to get back with Val and even Lilimae tries to help. He also becomes entranced by a beautiful singer called Ciji. Mack cautions Karen about her pursuit of Sid's killers. Kenny takes a professional interest in Ciji. Richard makes a big decision without involving Laura. First appearance of Ciji Dunne (recurring guest star Lisa Hartman).
57	4	"Svengali"	Nicholas Sgarro	Oliver Clark	October 21, 1982	17.0/29
Karen looks through KLMotors books to find checks from West Century Auto - Frank and Roy's company, whom she believes are Sid's killers. Karen also invests in Richard's restaurant after hearing about money worries from Laura. Val meets her new publicist, Chip Roberts. First appearance of Chip Roberts (recurring guest star Michael Sabatino).
58	5	"Catharsis"	Alexander Singer	Doran William Cannon	October 28, 1982	17.6/29
Gary must go to Dallas for the reading of his father's will and asks Val to accompany him, but she refuses. Abby wants to go with him but he does not ask her, and she is furious with him after later discovering he asked Val. Richard opens his restaurant "Daniel". Ginger is upset about Kenny's attentions toward Ciji's career and not hers. Karen and Mack finally get a confession from Sid's murderers.
59	6	"New Beginnings"	Lorraine Senna Ferrara	Mann Rubin	October 29, 1982	25.6/47
Gary goes to Dallas for the reading of Jock's will and Abby turns up to surprise him. Gary inherits millions from Jock, but is disgruntled by the terms of the will thinking his father never had any faith in him. Val is also in Dallas on a book signing tour and J.R. informs her about owning the publishing company behind her book. This episode concludes a crossover with Dallas that begins on "Jock's Will". It is also the last episode where Dallas characters cross over to Knots Landing, although Gary would appear on Dallas one more time in 1985, and again with Val in the 1991 finale.
60	7	"Investments"	Nicholas Sgarro	Patricia M. Green	November 4, 1982	18.4/31
Kenny and Gary go into business together, which infuriates Abby and she tells Gary that if they do not have a business together she will end their relationship. Chip moves in with Lilimae and she introduces him to Ciji. Karen and Mack confess their fears of new relationships and they later sleep together.
61	8	"Man in the Middle"	Lorraine Senna Ferrara	Richard Gollance	November 18, 1982	16.4/27
Abby and Gary move to a beach house together. Val becomes suspicious of Chip. Chip tells Ciji that he is dating Diana, which is helping her career.
62	9	"The Best Kept Secret"	Lorraine Senna Ferrara	Richard Gollance	December 2, 1982	18.5/31
Laura discovers Richard took money from Abby. Abby is jealous of Gary and Ciji spending the day together. Diana discovers Mack with another woman, Mack immediately tells Karen about it. Mack confesses his love to Karen but she does not reciprocate.
63	10	"Emergency"	Larry Elikann	Diana Gould	December 9, 1982	18.9/31
Diana needs a kidney transplant but the family are not compatible matches so Karen asks Abby to be tested. Karen lets Mack comfort her during the ordeal. Ginger writes a song and shows it to Kenny who has Ciji sing it, which infuriates Ginger.
64	11	"Abby's Choice"	Joseph B. Wallenstein	Oliver Clark	December 16, 1982	18.4/31
Abby initially refuses to donate her kidney to Diana until she is talked around. Chip tells Diana he loves her and presents her with a necklace, which was originally for Ciji. Laura and Ciji become close friends.
65	12	"The Block Party"	Nick Havinga	Sara Ann Friedman	December 30, 1982	16.3/28
Mack's father, Pete, returns to his life and begs for forgiveness as he is dying. Chip wants Ciji to sign a contract which will make him entitled to her earnings. Karen throws a party in the cul-de-sac and Diana sees Chip kissing Ciji.
66	13	"Cutting the Ties That Bind"	Ernest Pintoff	Michael L. Grace	January 6, 1983	17.9/29
Abby sells Ciji's contract to Jeff Munson. Jeff wants Kenny to produce Ciji, but Abby will only sell if they cut Kenny out of the deal. Abby goes to Gary's lawyer, James Westmont, and wants him to protect her interests in case Gary does not marry her. Ciji tells Chip that she is pregnant, and Chip yells that this will ruin everything and manhandles her. Val has been putting off signing her divorce papers but eventually signs them.
67	14	"And Teddy Makes Three"	Kim Friedman	Joel Steiger	January 13, 1983	18.5/31
Kenny and Gary almost have a fight over Abby's deals. Mack proposes to Karen and she accepts. Originally titled "Decisions".
68	15	"To Have and to Hold"	Ernest Pintoff	Michael Petryni	January 21, 1983	22.9/35
A tabloid newspaper prints Val's new manuscript about her break-up with Gary. Chip lies to Lilimae about Gary cheating on Abby with Ciji and Val overhears. Gary is overwhelmed by Val's manuscript and the situation Abby has created. Karen and Mack get married in Las Vegas.
69	16	"A New Family"	Bill Duke	Robert Bielak	January 27, 1983	19.6/30
Mack moves into Karen's home, which results in mixed feeling within the family. Gary, out of control, disrupts Ciji's recording session. Richard tells Laura he dislikes her spending so much time with Ciji. The rumours of Gary and Ciji's supposed affair are out in the open.
70	17	"The Morning After"	Jeff Bleckner	Diana Gould	February 3, 1983	18.4/29
Gary wakes up in Ciji's bed. Abby threatens Ciji to stay away from Gary. Ciji confides in Laura about everyone hating her as she has not done anything wrong. Richard accuses Laura of having a lesbian affair with Ciji. Abby has a clause put in her contract that gives her full power if Gary's alcoholism continues. Ciji discovers an old newspaper clipping Chip had been keeping about himself that says he is being sought for beating up a woman and that his name is actually Tony Fenice.
71	18	"Celebration"	Bill Duke	Mann Rubin	February 10, 1983	14.9/22
Richard physically attacks Ciji and Laura orders him to move out. Diana tells Karen she is moving to New York with Chip. Ciji blames Val for Gary's drinking. After Ciji does not show up to perform at the restaurant, her dead body washes ashore. Final appearance of Ciji Dunne (Lisa Hartman).
72	19	"The Loss of Innocence"	Alexander Singer	Kathleen A. Shelly & Michael Filerman	February 17, 1983	19.6/31
Ciji's body is discovered and a murder case begins with many people as suspects. Later, Gary is charged with her murder.
73	20	"The Fatal Blow"	Larry Elikann	Richard Gollance	February 24, 1983	19.3/31
Gary starts to sober up while in jail but Abby refuses to bail him out. Val admits to having a fight with Ciji before she was murdered.
74	21	"The Burden of Proof"	Alexander Singer	Diana Gould	March 3, 1983	20.2/33
Val is booked by the police after her confession and Abby makes Gary sign over power of attorney to her. Lilimae tells Chip he started the mess between Gary and Val because he leaked the transcript to the tabloids. Val is released and Richard secretly leaves Laura and Knots Landing. Final regular appearance of Richard Avery (John Pleshette), however he briefly reprises the role in season nine.
75	22	"Willing Victims"	David Jacobs	Peter Dunne	March 10, 1983	20.6/34
Laura calls the police to find Richard, believing he is Ciji's killer. Chip and Diana decide to leave for New York. A private investigator tells Lilimae he is looking for a dangerous man called Tony Fenice and he shows her a picture of Chip. By the time Karen finds out, she discovers Diana has already left with Chip and becomes frantic. Gary's hearing approaches but he does not co-operate and appears resigned to spending the rest of his life in jail for murder. Final appearances of Kenny (James Houghton) and Ginger Ward (Kim Lankford), although Lankford briefly reprises her role in the 1997 reunion special.

=== Season 5 (1983–84) ===
No. overall	No. in season	Title	Directed by	Written by	Original release date	Rating/share (households)
76	1	"The People vs. Gary Ewing"	Nicholas Sgarro	Michael Petryni	September 29, 1983	21.0/36
Mack believes Chip killed Ciji and a search begins for him. Karen is upset that Diana has gone with Chip. A mystery man helps Val when she is bombarded by reporters. The murder charge against Gary is dropped due to lack of evidence. Claudia Lonow (Diana Fairgate) and Douglas Sheehan (Ben Gibson) are added to the opening credits, replacing James Houghton, Kim Lankford and John Pleshette.
77	2	"Fugitives"	Larry Elikann	Scott Hamner	October 6, 1983	19.6/33
Val discovers who her mystery man is. Diana and Chip are on the road, where Diana discovers the police are after Chip. Chip confesses to her that he killed Ciji.
78	3	"Nowhere to Run"	Nicholas Sgarro	Jeff Freilich	October 13, 1983	19.8/32
Abby and Gary move into Westfork Ranch. Chip and Diana are found by the police but Diana rebuffs Karen in favor of Chip as she has just married him.
79	4	"Marital Privilege"	Larry Elikann	Richard Gollance	October 20, 1983	20.4/33
Diana tells Karen that Chip killed Ciji for her, then turns to Abby as she feels that Karen betrays her confidence. Abby's attempt to buy her way into the US Senate campaign of Greg Sumner is rebuffed. Abby has five days to marry Gary as he will then inherit 10% of Ewing Oil and she wants it to become community property. She and Westmont secretly start a subsidiary of Gary's company called "Apolune". William Devane (Greg Sumner) is added to the opening credits.
80	5	"One Kind of Justice"	David Jacobs	David Jacobs	October 27, 1983	18.5/33
Karen tries to reach Diana. At Greg's fundraiser, Val introduces Ben to Gary. Lilimae tries to make Chip and Diana testify as there is not enough evidence to prove that he killed Ciji. When Chip is released without charge, Lilimae takes the law into her own hands.
81	6	"... And Never Brought to Mind"	Sheldon Larry	Diana Gould	November 3, 1983	20.3/33
Lilimae is arrested as Chip lays in a coma. Abby pressures Gary into marriage. Diana blames Karen. Val seeks comfort in Gary and they end up sleeping together.
82	7	"Sacred Vows"	Nicholas Sgarro	Kathleen A. Shelly	November 10, 1983	20.3/32
Eric persuades Diana to testify. Val is torn up over Lilimae's legal problems. Laura advises Gary to leave Val alone. Gary and Abby marry, but while at a hotel on their honeymoon he meets a woman who looks exactly like Ciji. Recurring guest star Lisa Hartman returns as a new character, Cathy Geary.
83	8	"A Change of Heart"	Robert Becker	Joel J. Feigenbaum	November 17, 1983	21.0/33
Karen begins to take pain killers. Abby decides to secretly develop Lotus Point but Laura discovers what Abby is up to. Gary receives his 10% share of Ewing Oil but also becomes obsessed with Ciji's lookalike, Cathy. Chip disappears from the hospital.
84	9	"Money Talks"	Nicholas Sgarro	Peter Dunne	November 24, 1983	18.8/34
Abby finds out she will need a coastal variance to develop Lotus Point and asks Greg for help and they end up in bed together. Gary continues to pursue Cathy. Laura is surprised at the sight of Cathy. Abby continues to provide a home for Diana. Val and Ben sleep together. First appearance of Mary Frances Sumner (recurring guest star Danielle Brisebois).
85	10	"Homecoming"	John Pleshette	Alison Hock	December 1, 1983	20.6/33
Gary begins to have Cathy dress and sing like Ciji, which disturbs Laura. Abby and Greg are caught together by his daughter Mary-Frances. Diana finds Chip hiding at Gary's ranch.
86	11	"I'll Tell You No Lies"	Nicholas Sgarro	Michael L. Grace	December 8, 1983	21.8/35
Mack tries to find out who the head of the sinister Wolfbridge group is. Cathy tells Gary she is not Ciji and never will be. Abby receives her variance from Greg and they kiss but are seen by Laura. Karen continues to take the pain pills which causes Val concern. At the ranch, Chip tells Diana they must leave together but when he sees whom he thinks is the resurrected murder victim Ciji, but actually lookalike Cathy, he stumbles back and falls onto a pitchfork and is killed.
87	12	"Denials"	Lorraine Senna Ferrara	Diana Gould	December 15, 1983	20.4/33
Mack realizes Wolfbridge is bigger than he first thought. Abby warns Laura to not play her game. Val tells Mack she is worried about Karen's dependency on pills but Karen disagrees with her. Final appearance of Chip Roberts (Michael Sabatino).
88	13	"Witness"	Nicholas Sgarro	Richard Gollance	December 22, 1983	21.6/35
Greg's wife, Jane, comes to town. It becomes clear that Abby hired Cathy because she looked like Ciji and wanted to keep Gary occupied, but when Cathy tells her she wants to end their deal, Abby will not let her. Ben asks Val to be more committed to their relationship. Val discovers she is pregnant, but Gary is the father.
89	14	"Secrets Cry Aloud"	Alexander Singer	Diana Gould	December 29, 1983	20.7/34
Lilimae learns that Val is pregnant, and Val swears her to secrecy. Lilimae, believing that Ben already knows, inadvertently tells him about the pregnancy. Val tells Ben that the baby is Gary's, and he leaves her. Mack's investigation into Wolfbridge results in his office and home, as well as Greg's office being ransacked. Abby is forced to be partners with Wolfbridge in the Lotus Point development. Karen's pill dependency gets worse.
90	15	"Forsaking All Others"	Bill Duke	Joyce Keener	January 5, 1984	21.8/36
Karen is admitted into a rehab program. Abby gets angry at Greg for getting her involved with Wolfbridge. Greg also has his own problems with them during the election. Final appearance of Danielle Brisebois as Mary Frances Sumner, the character would return and be recast with Stacy Galina in season eleven.
91	16	"Reconcilable Differences"	Sheldon Larry	Richard Gollance	January 12, 1984	20.9/34
Gary discovers that Cathy spent four years in prison. Lilimae continues to betray Val's confidence, this time telling Gary that Val is pregnant with Ben's baby. Ben tells Val to inform everyone that Gary is the father of her baby. Greg and Laura sleep together. Ben and Mack delve deeper into Wolfbridge and Karen begins therapy.
92	17	"Second Chances"	Bill Duke	Joel J. Feigenbaum	January 19, 1984	20.9/33
Gary tells Abby about Cathy's prison sentence but Abby pretends to know nothing about it. She tells Cathy to leave or she will tell her ex-husband where she is. Mack is attacked. Karen and Diana finally make up.
93	18	"Lest the Truth be Known"	Larry Elikmann	Ron Cowen & Daniel Lipman	February 2, 1984	20.1/33
Cathy's ex-husband, Ray, arrives. Mack learns that Apolune is Abby's company via Laura, who is being threatened by Mark St. Claire of the Wolfbridge Group.
94	19	"... So Shall You Reap"	Alexander Singer	Rob Cowen & Daniel Lipman	February 9, 1984	22.9/37
Ben proposes to Val and tells her he will raise her child as his own. Cathy tells Gary that she went to prison after taking the blame for Ray's crime. Abby denies being involved with Wolfbridge, but Gary throws her out after her schemes are exposed. Abby is left alone as Olivia chooses to stay with Gary, while Brian stays elsewhere.
95	20	"High Ideals"	Robert Becker	Rob Cowen & Daniel Lipman	February 16, 1984	19.9/31
Abby orders Cathy to leave the ranch until Gary tells her to stay. Gary and Cathy sleep together. Gary wants to divorce Abby but she does not want to divorce him. Originally titled "Personal Effects".
96	21	"No Trumpets, No Drums"	Larry Elikann	Scott Hamner	February 23, 1984	19.8/33
Val learns she is having twins. Ben disappears while in El Salvador. Gary protects Cathy from Ray.
97	22	"Silent Missions"	Lorraine Senna Ferrara	Angelo Pizzo	March 1, 1984	22.1/35
Val wants to go and find Ben in El Salvador but is persuaded not to because of her pregnancy. The Wolfbridge Group arranges to have Gary eliminated so that Abby will inherit his money and Lotus Point will continue. After a shooting at Gary's ranch, Mack tells Val that Gary has been killed.
98	23	"Finishing Touches"	David Jacobs	Peter Dunne	March 8, 1984	22.1/35
Everyone is shocked about Gary's murder. Ben is found alive in El Salvador. Abby is questioned about Gary's murder and the Wolfbridge group but denies any involvement. Cathy celebrates a moment with Gary, who is actually alive.
99	24	"Yesterday, It Rained"	Bill Duke	Joel J. Feigenbaum	March 22, 1984	22.4/37
Ben returns home to Val. The hitman actually shot Ray, not Gary. Greg asks Karen why none of the Ewings of Dallas came to Gary's funeral, and tells St. Claire that he thinks Gary is still alive. Greg tells Abby to sell Lotus Point to Wolfbridge, but she will not. Greg tells St. Claire that he is through dealing with him, and calls Abby to tell her Gary is alive. Abby goes to the Mackenzies' house and tells Karen that Gary's alive and Mack is using him to get to Wolfbridge. Karen feels betrayed and confronts Mack after he promised her he was done investigating the dangerous Wolfbridge Group and tells him their marriage is over.
100	25	"Negotiations"	Larry Elikann	Richard Gollance	March 29, 1984	23.3/38
The Wolfbridge Group arranges to have Gary killed once and for all, but the plan goes disastrously wrong. Abby is kidnapped by them and Karen is shot by accident.

=== Season 6 (1984–85) ===
No. overall	No. in season	Title	Directed by	Written by	Original release date	Rating/share (households)
101	1	"Buying Time"	Alexander Singer	Kevin Alexander	October 4, 1984	21.1/34
The police lose Abby, who was kidnapped by Mark St. Claire. Abby is held on a yacht. Karen is told she will need surgery to remove the bullet. Alec Baldwin (Joshua Rush) and Lisa Hartman (Cathy Geary) are added to the opening credits, replacing Claudia Lonow, who returns as a guest star.
102	2	"Calculated Risks"	Ernest Pintoff	Susan Goldberg	October 18, 1984	19.7/33
Karen is told that a piece of the shattered bullet is lodged in her spine and must have risky surgery to remove it but she refuses because of what happened to Sid. Lilimae's nephew arrives to stay with her and wishes to know about his mother. Greg finds Abby and shoots St. Claire. First appearance of Joshua Rush (Alec Baldwin) and the final regular appearance of Diana Fairgate (Claudia Lonow), who briefly reprises her role in the final season.
103	3	"Hanging Fire"	Alexander Singer	Alan Goldfein	October 25, 1984	20.5/33
Greg tells the police he shot St. Claire in self defense and Abby backs him up. Gary tells Abby he is taking back the company and has made several changes. Gary ends his affair with Cathy and Val guesses that Lilimae is Joshua's real mother.
104	4	"A Little Help"	Robert Becker	Diana Kopald Marcus	November 1, 1984	19.2/32
Greg tells Abby they will never work together again. Joshua discovers Lilimae is his real mother.
105	5	"Ipso Facto"	Larry Elikann	John Saffron	November 8, 1984	19.4/31
Abby finds out that Gary is the real father of Val's unborn babies.
106	6	"Truth and Consequences"	Robert Becker	Joyce Keener	November 15, 1984	20.7/35
Val and Gary try to reunite Mack and Karen. Abby worries that Val will tell Gary of the babies true paternity. Abby complains to Scott Easton about the babies. Cathy and Joshua have a romantic dinner. Greg wins the election and becomes senator.
107	7	"Love to Take You Home"	Larry Elikann	Peter Dunne	November 22, 1984	16.3/30
Eric and Michael are furious with Karen. Karen serves Mack with divorce papers. Joshua faces his father. Joshua and Cathy sleep together. Scott Easton has lunch with Mitch Ackerman. Val goes to see her obstetrician, but he has been called away to a conference, and there is a new doctor - Mitch Ackerman.
108	8	"Tomorrow Never Knows"	Nick Havinga	Joel J. Feigenbaum	November 29, 1984	21.4/36
Joshua decides to stay in Knots Landing. Karen and Mack reconcile. Laura agrees to go to Washington with Greg. Val goes into labour but is put under sedation, however remains conscious and hears the babies cry and the nurse saying they are healthy. When Val comes round Dr. Ackerman tells Val the babies were stillborn. While in shock over the news of Val's babies, Abby receives a mysterious phone call requesting information about the blood type of the babies father.
109	9	"We Gather Together"	Larry Elikann	Richard Gollance	December 6, 1984	20.2/32
No one believes Val when she says her babies are alive. Abby continues to receive mysterious phone calls about the babies and suspects Scott is involved, but she is unable to track him down.
110	10	"Message in a Bottle"	Nick Havinga	Joel J. Feigenbaum	December 13, 1984	20.3/33
Abby asks Dr. Ackerman where the babies are but he tells her she is sick. Karen's hands continue to cause her problems. Scott Easton turns up dead and Ben is concerned with Val. Gary meets Paul Galveston, who gives Gary an expensive gift. First appearance of Paul Galveston (special guest star Howard Duff).
111	11	"Distant Locations"	Larry Elikann	Richard Gollance	December 20, 1984	20.9/34
Val travels to her home town of Shula, Tennessee under the pseudonym of Verna Ellers and gets a job in a diner. Meanwhile, everyone tries to locate Val. Joshua makes a televised appeal to Val. Paul offers Gary expensive land at an inexpensive price, and invites Gary to partner with him installing communications systems.
112	12	"Uncharted Territory"	Nicholas Sgarro	Joyce Keener	December 27, 1984	20.3/33
Galveston asks Gary to get involved with Empire Valley. Val hears a report about her disappearance but does not respond to it. Viewer response to Joshua's television appearance motivates Abby. Abby's private investigator has tracked Val down and reported back to Abby, but Abby remains silent about it. After Michael saves her from a potential catastrophe, Karen finally reveals the extent of her health problems to Mack.
113	13	"Weighing of Evils"	Lorraine Senna Ferrara	Scott Hamner	January 3, 1985	21.4/33
Karen agrees to have the surgery. Abby wants to be part of Empire Valley but Galveston refuses as she is a woman.
114	14	"#14 With a Bullet"	Nicholas Sgarro	Peter Dunne	January 10, 1985	18.6/28
Karen's surgery is successful. Galveston realises that Abby knows where Val is.
115	15	"Inside Information"	Lorraine Senna Ferrara	Scott Hamner	January 17, 1985	20.4/33
Greg tells Laura about Galveston being his father. Abby confronts Val but she does not recognize her and Parker asks Val to marry him after discovering she is Valene Ewing. Gary flies to Tennessee.
116	16	"Out of the Past"	Bill Duke	Neal Bell	January 24, 1985	21.3/34
Gary tries to help Val regain her memory but she thinks he is crazy and tells her new boyfriend, Parker, that she will marry him. Karen unknowingly tells Galveston about Mack's investigation.
117	17	"Lead Me to the Altar"	Ernest Pintoff	Parke Perine	January 31, 1985	22.9/36
Before her wedding to Parker, Gary shows Val her picture on the back of her book "Nashville Junction". Abby worries that Mack will discover her connection to Val's missing babies. Joshua berates Cathy about her life.
118	18	"Fly Away Home"	Bill Duke	Neal Bell	February 7, 1985	21.9/35
Val finally regains some memories and agrees to return home with Gary. Mack believes that Empire Valley is a cover for something bigger. Galeveston tells Abby he will tell Gary about being the twins' father but he suffers a stroke as Abby watches helplessly. Final appearance of Paul Galveston (Howard Duff).
119	19	"Rough Edges"	Nicholas Sgarro	Richard Gollance	February 14, 1985	20.7/35
Val begins therapy and remembers her troubled past with her mother. Abby tries to find evidence on Scott Easton regarding Val's babies.
120	20	"The Emperor's Clothes"	Ernest Pintoff	Joel J. Feigenbaum	February 21, 1985	18.8/33
Gary wants to shut down construction on Empire Valley until he speaks to Galveston, who is away. Ben discovers Galveston Industries caused an epidemic when chemicals contaminated the water and Galveston covered it up. Val tells Karen she knows her babies are alive. Karen asks Mack to consider the possibility that the babies could be alive. Galveston gets married.
121	21	"The Deluge"	Bill Duke	Joyce Keener	February 28, 1985	20.3/34
Karen starts to question people about the day Val gave birth. Galveston dies and his wife Ruth arrives, telling her son, Greg, that she wants him to take over Galveston Industries. Greg learns that Empire Valley is a communications center, which will be used to interfere with the governments own communications. First appearance of Ruth Sumner Galveston (special guest star Ava Gardner).
122	22	"A Piece of the Pie"	Robert Becker	Parke Perine	March 7, 1985	20.4/34
Karen talks with Val's original obstetricians, who reveal they were called away to a conference when Val gave birth. Cathy sings on Joshua's show and he announces he and Cathy are going to be married, taking her by complete surprise. Mack finds an address in Galveston's papers, which leads him to a couple called Mr. & Mrs. Fisher who are parents of newborn twins. Greg resigns from the Senate and takes over Galveston Industries. Abby tells him she wants to be a part of the real Empire Valley.
123	23	"The Forest for the Trees"	Nick Havinga	Michael Russnow	March 21, 1985	16.0/26
Joshua proposes to Cathy and she accepts. Val is concerned about how Joshua is treating Cathy. Abby manipulates Coblentz into telling her everything he knows. Karen meets Val's nurse but does not get any answers.
124	24	"A Man of Good Will"	Linda Day	Lynn Marie Latham & Bernard Lechowick	March 28, 1985	19.4/33
Ben tells Karen to stop going on about the twins being alive. Greg has Gary's credit rating hacked, and then offers to buy Gary out of Empire Valley. Eric wants Knots Landing Motors to be sold but Karen has no interest in selling it as she wants Sid's dream to live on through them. After a visit to Sid's grave with Eric, Karen tells Eric that she is okay with someone else managing the company, much to Eric's happiness. Joshua bullies Cathy into wedding plans. Gary learns that Galveston has left Empire Valley to him in his will.
125	25	"For Better, For Worse"	Robert Becker	Roberto Loeiderman	April 4, 1985	18.2/29
Greg tries to make Gary aware of the importance of Empire Valley without telling him any details but says that he has to agree to let things continue in the direction they have been going or sell the land. Gary refuses. John Coblentz finally fills Gary in and gets him to agree to the associates demands. Joshua upsets Abby and Ben while on air. Joshua and Cathy get married. Karen finally catches up with Dr Ackerman.
126	26	"Four, No Trump"	John Patterson	Melanie Mintz	April 11, 1985	19.9/32
Karen tries to talk to Dr. Ackerman without much success. Ackerman calls Abby telling her to sort it out. Gary tells Greg he wants to be part of Empire Valley and later lies to Mack and Ben about what is going on there. Abby tells Greg about Scott Easton and her link to Val's missing babies in order to get Galveston's papers which Greg gives her, but he has kept the relevant ones for himself. Greg is then seen observing the babies from his car.
127	27	"A Price to Pay"	David Jacobs	Loren Reichman	May 2, 1985	17.8/30
Ben proposes to Val but she declines and he believes she can hear her babies cry. Karen tells Ben of her and Mack's investigation. Greg asks Abby to get Gary out of Empire Valley and suggests that if Gary knows he is the father of Val's twins his interest in Empire Valley will disappear. Mack is offered the chance to become a senator. First appearance of Jill Bennett (recurring guest star Teri Austin).
128	28	"One Day in a Row"	Robert Becker	Joyce Keener	May 9, 1985	19.2/32
Ben discovers Ackerman has a motive for stealing Val's babies. Ruth helps Abby get Scott Easton's notebook pages.
129	29	"Vulnerable"	Nick Havinga	Parke Perine	May 16, 1985	20.2/32
Val's nurse reveals Ackerman stole the babies and when Karen and Mack confront him, Ackerman shoots himself in the head. Final appearance of Ruth Sumner Galveston (Ava Gardner).
130	30	"The Long and Winding Road"	Alexander Singer	Joel J. Feigenbaum	May 23, 1985	22.9/38
Greg asks Laura to marry him. Mack tracks the babies down to Harry and Sheila Fisher. Abby tells Val that the babies are alive and she takes her to the Fisher's home, where Harry drives away with one of the twins. This episode marked the first and only time the series hit #1 in the weekly Nielsen ratings. Season 6 was also the only year the program earned a placement on Nielsen's annual Top 10 list.

=== Season 7 (1985–86) ===
No. overall	No. in season	Title	Directed by	Written by	Original release date	Rating/share (households)
131	1	"The Longest Day"	Arthur Allan Seidelman	David Paulsen	September 26, 1985	21.8/34
Mack and Ben try to follow Harry, who has one of the twins. Harry produces a certificate of live birth as evidence that the adoption was legal. At the hospital, Val is told that there is no record of the babies being born there.
132	2	"Here in My Arms"	Nicholas Sgarro	Parke Perine	October 3, 1985	21.3/34
While Gary is in Dallas for Bobby's funeral, Greg changes the plans at Empire Valley. Mack has a restraining order put on the Fishers to stop them leaving town with the babies. Karen tries to persuade Harry to accept that the babies cannot remain with him and Sheila. Val finally has her babies returned to her.
133	3	"While the Cat's Away"	Lorraine Senna Ferrara	E. Jeffrey Smith	October 10, 1985	19.7/33
Greg and Abby make sure the detonation area at Empire Valley goes ahead, despite it being in the place Gary did not want. Val gets used to being a mother to the twins as Ben feels left out. Abby hands running of the TV station over to Ben. Joshua is furious when Cathy agrees to buy a house without consulting him and tells her to move into it by herself. Gary grieves for Bobby.
134	4	"The Christening"	Larry Elikann	David Assael	October 17, 1985	20.2/33
Cathy and Joshua's relationship is getting physically aggressive. Ben suggests a possible change of emphasis to Joshua's show which Joshua aggressively dismisses. Val asks Karen if she and Mack would become the Godparents of the twins. Jill accuses Mack of being a flirt and kisses him to show him that she knows his advances are not serious. Gary asks Abby to take care of Empire Valley while he grieves. Val asks Ben if she can name one of the twins after Bobby Ewing. He agrees. Joshua decides that he will move into the new house with Cathy. Greg gives phony surveys of Empire Valley to Abby that she can use to prove to Gary that they had no choice but to override his building plans. Sheila Fisher is caught stalking the twins. Harry later takes her to say goodbye to the twins at Val's house. Greg comes across Laura with another man and reacts badly. Joshua tells Cathy that he has not got around to moving out of his mother's house because she is dying.
135	5	"A Little Assistance"	Roy Campanella II	Melanie Mintz	October 24, 1985	18.9/29
Mack talks to the press about the need for an adoption agency watchdog. Gary breaks in a new horse with Olivia and gives it to her. Ben buys a piano for the babies. Greg informs his colleagues that he can get round Gary using Abby and that they have nothing to worry about. Jill tries to move her stuff into Mack's office, he throws her out. Gary tells Karen that if he needs her he will let her know. Ben tells Joshua that his ratings are slipping and he had better come up with something to turn things around. Mack tells Karen that Jill is like Dracula's sister. Joshua takes Ben's pressure out on Cathy. Next morning Cathy has a black eye. Peter Hollister appoints himself Greg's new secretary by sending away the other applicants and announcing himself. Greg finally gives him the job. Karen finally meets Jill. Gary decides he is going back to work. First appearance of Peter Hollister (recurring guest star Hunt Block).
136	6	"A Question of Trust"	Linda Day	Bernard Lechowick	October 31, 1985	18.5/31
Ben wants to quit running the TV station, so Abby says he can put all the profits the station makes back into the journalism department. Gary finally finds out about the work at Empire Valley and is furious. Karen invites Jill to her home for dinner, surprising Mack. Abby blackmails Frank Elliot. Mack and Jill question Kavanagh's nurse. Gary tells Elliot he'll need him to for support. Karen is paranoid about Jill. Jill tells Mack she will be leaving. Mack tells her she has to stay around as a witness to the deposition they got from the nurse.
137	7	"Awakenings"	Lorraine Senna Ferrara	Lynn Marie Latham	November 7, 1985	16.0/25
Gary starts enquiring into the surveys for Empire Valley. Joshua asks Abby to get Ben off his back. Joshua starts seeing a waitress. Cathy smells perfume on Joshua and lets him know. Mack and Jill get Kavanagh. Jill tells Mack decide that it is good she is leaving as they have been getting too close. Laura tells Karen she does not want to work with her at Lotus Point but later changes her mind. Joshua tells Cathy he does not need her help and they fight physically. Cathy goes to Ben after the fight. Ben and Val talk about their lack of a relationship. Val tells Ben that from then on he is the babies' father. Gary begins to wonder if he is the father.
138	8	"Pictures at a Wedding"	Nicholas Sgarro	David Paulsen & Michael Filerman	November 14, 1985	21.3/36
Val and Ben tell Karen and Mack that they are going to get married. Joshua goes to see Cathy to apologise and ends up threatening her again. Gary asks Karen if the babies are his. Joshua get suddenly rejected by a new TV station and blames Ben, Val throws him out after he starts wrecking the house. Greg puts Peter Hollister back in his place. Joshua disrupts a TV broadcast. Greg lays it on the line to Abby about the smooth flowing of the project at Empire Valley. Ben's doctor informs him that Lilimae has nothing more than a little bursitis. Ben tells Cathy. Ben sees Val talking to Gary before the wedding.
139	9	"Until Parted by Death"	Larry Elikann	Bernard Lechowick	November 21, 1985	19.9/32
Gary asks Val if she is happy. She says that she is. Cathy confronts Joshua about his lies concerning Lilimae. Val and Ben get married. Frank Elliot warns Abby that he will not cover up Empire Valley for the sake of his son's career. Joshua threatens Cathy at the wedding, Cathy slaps his face and Joshua tells Laura to mind her own business. Joshua leaves the wedding and cooks for his girlfriend Linda. Frank Elliot discovers the underground areas at Empire Valley. Cathy goes home to find Joshua waiting for her. Laura tells Joshua to leave. Joshua pushes Laura down and Mack threatens him with the police. Joshua lies to Mack. Gary hears that Frank Elliot is dead, electrocuted at the broadcast center. Mack tells Gary he is not going to look into Frank Elliot's death. Greg tells Abby (outside her office, because it is bugged) that she was probably responsible for Frank Elliot's death. Joshua tells Linda that the next time Cathy chooses death, he will not be able to stop her.
140	10	"Rise and Fall"	Robert Becker	Parke Perine	December 5, 1985	19.3/31
Greg gets angry with Coblentz over Frank Elliot's death. Joshua envisages his and Cathy's demise. Joshua takes up street preaching. Val dismisses him and drags Lilimae away. Mack tells Gary that no-one must know about his investigating Elliot's death, including Abby or Karen. Lilimae goes street searching for Joshua and begs him to come home. Greg tells Abby how dangerous Coblentz is. Mack, Karen, Val and Lilimae talk about getting Joshua committed, Lilimae refuses. Lilimae goes off to find Joshua. Joshua is hiding in Cathy's car when she leaves the TV station. Lilimae finds Joshua holding Cathy off the edge of a building. Joshua falls, on his own. Final appearance of Joshua Rush (Alec Baldwin), he is removed from the opening credits in the following episode.
141	11	"To Sing His Praise"	David Paulsen	Lynn Marie Latham	December 12, 1985	20.4/33
Gary's investigations show that Abby is in to her neck in what is going on. Lilimae refuses to accept the 'reported' cause of death as suicide. Greg loses his temper with Gary over Empire Valley. Coblentz quietly arranges the murder of Abby and Gary. Val explains that Joshua committed suicide to his father. Gary drives himself off the road after being followed by a truck. Abby admits that Empire Valley is behind all the 'accidents' including Frank Elliot. She begs Gary to sell up. Gary says he cannot because he wants a clear conscience. Greg warns Abby about a lack of time. Joshua is buried. Gary discovers the underground world of Empire Valley.
142	12	"All's Well"	Joseph Scanlan	Alan Goldfein	December 19, 1985	20.6/34
Gary and Greg have two different views of Empire Valley. Gary and Mack explore Empire Valley underground. Gary finds the brakes on his truck do not work. Gary threatens Greg that he has left Empire Valley to Mack in his will. Greg tries to redirect Koblentz. Koblentz will not change his direction of operations. Gary takes Abby back to Empire Valley. Mack goes to Greg who says he cannot control what is going on. Gary takes over the underground Empire Valley. Karen and Mack head to Empire Valley worried about Gary. Gary and Abby meet Greg at Empire Valley, a sniper looks on, Karen and Mack Arrive. Gary blows the place up.
143	13	"Aftershocks"	Alexander Singer	Roberto Loeiderman	December 26, 1985	19.7/34
Greg threatens Abby about information about Val's babies. Greg tells Koblentz that Gary Ewing Blew up Empire Valley because he tried to have him killed.
144	14	"Unbroken Bonds"	Roy Campanella II	Diana Kopald Marcus	January 2, 1986	19.6/32
Conflicting stories about Joshua cause the police to ask questions of Lilimae. Gary tells Val that he knows the babies are his. Val tells him to back off as she has a new family. Laura invites Greg to dinner and starts seeing him again. Val and Ben and friends celebrate Ben's birthday, Val tells Karen that Gary knows the babies are his. Gary has a one night stand. Karen meets with Jill. The governor is considering Karen for a job in the State Planning Commission. Gary tells Abby that he trusts Karen but does not trust her. Ben asks Gary to back off. Greg tells Peter that maybe they should put a tail on Gary. Greg tells Abby to find out what Gary's 'plan' is. Gary tells Mack that he goes through life with no plans. Police indict someone over Joshua's death.
145	15	"Web of Lies"	Nicholas Sgarro	Diana Kopald Marcus	January 9, 1986	21.5/34
Lilimae is asked to look at suspects in a line up. Abby objects to Laura's involvement at Lotus Point. Gary takes Jill out to dinner where they bump into Karen and Mack. Cathy tells Mack that Joshua was not killed but just fell off the building. Val tells Lilimae to get to the police and tell them what happened to Joshua or she will be in trouble. Gary tells Abby that there is no 'us' between them. Ben announces that the governor is considering giving Abby a job in the State Planning Commission much to the shock of Mack and Karen.
146	16	"The Confession"	Nick Havinga	David Paulsen	January 16, 1986	20.7/33
The police arrive to question Lilimae. Lilimae repeats lies to Mack that she told the police. Greg tells Abby that he will get her on the commission so long as she gets him what he wants. Gary and Abby argue over Abby's track record. Greg and Laura sleep together again. Mack coaches Lilimae about telling the police the truth. Abby blackmails Karen about her drug problem. Val waits while Lilimae and Cathy are questioned by police. Lilimae finally tells the police the truth. Jill introduces Karen to the head of the Planning Commission. Karen tells him of her previous drug problem. He tells her that the governor has chosen Abby for the job at the commission. Cathy's friend has been recording their conversations.
147	17	"Alterations"	Linda Day	Parke Perine	January 23, 1986	20.6/33
The police decide the Joshua Rush case is closed. A newspaper runs a story on Cathy and Lilimae's involvement in Joshua's death. The governor makes Jill Mack's administrative assistant. Olivia hears the truth about her mother's secrets on the phone. Jill gives Mack the key to her hotel room. Olivia leaves a message saying she is not coming home. She asks Karen if she can move into her house. Olivia threatens Abby that she will tell Gary about the babies if she does not let her stay with Karen and Mack. Matthew Newmark replaces Danny Ponce in the recurring role of Jason Avery.
148	18	"Friendly Enemies"	Joseph Scanlan	Diana Kopald Marcus	January 30, 1986	19.4/31
Olivia does not want to talk to Abby and tells her why in front of Karen. Sonny is creeping around between the TV station and Cathy looking for more dirt for the Newspaper. Peter Hollister reveals to Greg that he is his brother. Karen finds Jill's hotel room key in Mack's jacket pocket. Abby overhears about Peter being Greg's half brother. Ben and Val discover that Sonny has been behind the newspaper stories. Mack tries to explain about having the key to Karen. She is not impressed. Cathy tells Sonny what really happened on the roof with Joshua. Abby wants to meet with Peter.
149	19	"The Key to a Woman's Heart"	Robert Becker	Lynn Marie Latham	February 6, 1986	19.9/32
Karen and Mack fight over breakfast. Olivia does not want to be around Abby or Gary. Gary tells Karen that Olivia is probably better off staying with her and Mack. Cathy hears the truth about Sonny. Peter tells Abby they might find a few areas of mutual interest. Mack gives Jill her key back and tells her he is flattered. Cathy punches Sonny. Greg tells Peter that he needs to take back what Gary stole from Galveston industries.
150	20	"A Very Special Gift"	Nick Havinga	Lawrence Kasha	February 13, 1986	20.3/32
Karen is not talking to Mack. Greg and Abby argue about her role on the planning commission. Abby thinks Karen is letting Olivia run wild. Karen laughs hysterically at Abby when Abby tries to hurt Karen by mentioning Jill and Mack, leading Karen to realize that Abby is oblivious to what is happening with Jill and Gary. She then makes up with Mack. Peter is spending money he does not have. He tells his mother he can play Abby and Greg against each other if he needs to do so. Peter invites Abby to lunch and tells Greg. Greg tells Peter to get Abby to divorce Gary so she can get him to give her Empire Valley. At lunch Abby sees Gary and Jill kissing. Gary gets a fancy new racing car. Greg, Abby and Peter have a meeting. Greg asks Abby how he can get Empire Valley back in its rightful owners hands, namely his. Abby learns that Greg and Peter are half brothers. Michael finds a joint in Olivia's bag. Gary takes Jill for a ride in his new car at very high speed. The babies have a birthday party. Gary has deeded half of Empire Valley to the twins. Abby hires a detective to investigate Jill. Peter bumps into Gary and Jill. While Gary gets the car, Jill asks what Peter is doing there and he asks her if Gary suspects anything. She says that she does not think he does.
151	21	"Irrevocably Yours"	Robert Becker	Sara Ann Friedman	February 20, 1986	18.6/30
Michael tells Olivia he knows she is stoned, which she denies. Laura tells Greg that Gary gave the twins half of Empire Valley which Greg claims is his ground. Mack hears how Jill hounded the governor to be given the job she claims she never wanted. Gary tells Val he will not take the gift back because the twins are his children. Lilimae revisits the roof where Joshua fell. Mack confronts Jill. Lilimae relives Joshua's accident. Abby takes Olivia to dinner. Olivia goes to the bathroom to smoke a joint. Abby confronts Gary about his gift to the twins. Peter listens in on a conversation between Abby and Greg and learns about Abby's secrets. Ben confronts Gary about his gift to the twins. Michael is stopped by a cop who finds two of Olivia's joints on the floor.
152	22	"High School Confidential"	David Paulsen	Sally Susman	March 6, 1986	18.4/30
Olivia wants to know why Gary was sleeping with Val whilst living with her mother. Michael is questioned by the police then by Mack and Karen. Greg tells Laura she has to decide whose side she is on. Gary has an accident avoiding pedestrians while test racing a car but is only bruised. Abby asks Peter to 'distract' Jill. Greg's lawyer advises him to buy Peter out. Greg tells him to make him an offer and tells Laura that if he accepts less than half he is not his brother. Mack finds Jill's photo in a Westfall yearbook under the name Dorothy Simpkins. Peter visits Jill and tells her that Abby wants him to distract her. He also mentions Abby's secret.
153	23	"Distant Rumblings"	Michael Preece	Joel Okmin & Tom Citrano	March 13, 1986	17.8/30
Val visits Gary in the hospital. Greg and Laura visit Peter's mother and make her an offer of $5 million. Mack questions Jill about being Dorothy Simpkins. Peter tells his mother that he needs more than $5 million and rejects Greg's offer. Gary tells Abby he is not going home with her. Jill tells Mack that her family owned most of Empire Valley until Paul Galveston swindled them out of it. Abby finds dope in Olivia's bag and takes her to see Karen and Mack and apologise to Michael. Jill tells Gary that she cannot get past him being married. Mack blames Gary for Olivia's problem and for interfering in Val and Ben's marriage. The judge tells Olivia that there will not be an arrest record if she agrees to join a support group. Gary tells Abby he is going to divorce her.
154	24	"Phoenix Rises"	Nicholas Sgarro	Bernard Lechowick	March 27, 1986	18.1/31
Gary gives Karen 32 acres of Empire Valley, Greg is furious. Abby does not want a divorce. She tells Gary that if he does not give her the rest of Empire Valley she will drag out their divorce and involve everyone including the twins. Ben tells Cathy that she has been offered the chance to go on tour. Tired of being blackmailed Abby tells everyone that she knew about the twins kidnapping all along. Abby bluffs Sylvia into telling her that Peter is not her son. The planning commission reject Karen's plans, Abby says it was not her doing. Gary empathizes with Olivia. Abby takes Olivia home from Karen's. Gary gives Abby Empire Valley in writing. Eric is taken to the hospital.
155	25	"The Legacy"	Timma Ramon	Lynn Marie Latham	April 3, 1986	18.5/31
Abby finds out that Gary gave Karen 3200 acres of Empire Valley instead of 32. Greg asks Laura to marry him. Greg fires Peter. Gary tells Jill that he gave the rest of Empire Valley to Abby. Gary sees Peter and Jill together. Abby discovers Galveston had disposed of arsenic and acid at Empire Valley. Abby tells Peter she wants 51% of everything he gets or she will tell Greg that he is not Sylvia's son. Jill tells Gary that she and Peter are just friends just like she is his friend. She says she might see him later, he says maybe never. Peter is furious with Sylvia for telling Abby everything. Sylvia says she deserves the money as she really had Galveston's baby. Peter says he has done all the work and it would be simpler if she just fell down a stairwell or had a heart attack. Eric is confirmed as having arsenic poisoning. Jill wants out of the plan with Peter because she says Gary loves her and she does not want to hurt him. Peter says he cares because she is his sister, the only family he has, but that Galveston is responsible for their parents' deaths and they cannot quit now.
156	26	"Arsenic and Old Waste"	David Paulsen	David Paulsen	April 10, 1986	18.4/32
Eric is still sick in hospital. Mack excuses Jill of being involved in a cover up of the poisoning at Empire Valley. Abby blames Gary for the release of toxins from sealed containers after he blew up Empire Valley buildings. Sylvia tells Peter she is scared of him. Greg tells Laura he is going to get Empire Valley back even if it is covered in toxic waste. Ben has started having an affair with Cathy. Val feels that she is losing him.
157	27	"A Change of Heart"	Joseph Scanlan	Parke Perine	April 17, 1986	17.9/31
Greg takes Laura on a trip, they get married. Jill wants out of her plan with Peter. Cathy tells Ben she does not want to leave to go on tour. Laura asks Greg to clean up Empire Valley. Greg tells Karen that he will clean up Empire Valley if she helps him get it all back and that if she does not she can kiss Lotus Point goodbye.
158	28	"His Brother's Keeper"	Larry Elikann	Bernard Lechowick	May 1, 1986	18.6/30
Abby wants Karen to accept Greg's offer. Greg bribes Senator Henderson to give up his seat and become a consultant for Galveston Industries. Abby overhears that Jill's family used to own Empire Valley. She tells Gary. Jill tells Gary that she only first went out with him because she wanted Empire Valley, but then she fell in love with him. He storms off. Gary heads to Dallas. Greg wants Peter to be State Senator. Charlie Lee dies of Arsenic poisoning and Karen decides to close Lotus Point.
159	29	"Thicker Than Water"	Kate Swofford Tilley	Lawrence Kasha	May 8, 1986	14.0/22
Peter says he does not want to be Senator. Gary returns from Dallas with news that his family will not fund the cleanup at Empire Valley. Karen tells Abby that she will never sell to Greg. Gary tells Val he wants to take back Empire Valley from the twins. Ben decides to become Cathy's tour manager. Abby tells Peter he will accept Greg's offer to become Senator. Peter signs a deal with Greg. Ben tells Val he is going on tour with Cathy for six weeks. Lilimae is angry with Cathy and slaps her. Gary gives Empire Valley to Greg. Abby and Peter sleep together. Ben tells Val he has to get away and leaves. Paige Matheson shows up and tells Mack she is his daughter. First appearance of Paige Matheson (Nicollette Sheridan).
160	30	"The Longest Night"	Joseph Scanlan	David Paulsen	May 15, 1986	20.0/33
Paige tells Mack her mother died a year ago. Karen has gone missing. Eric sees his mother's car parked at Lotus Point. Abby and Peter sleep together. Paige tells her story to Michael. Gary finds Peter's car at Abby's and takes Olivia off to stay in a hotel. Mack reports Karen missing to the police. Gary and Olivia find Jill waiting for him at the hotel. Cathy tells Ben she never wanted to hurt Val. Val goes to the beach house and finds evidence of Ben and Cathy's affair. She smashes the place up. Karen wakes up in a cellar having been kidnapped. Eric accuses Greg of having something to do with Karen's disappearance. Gary goes to find Val on the beach. Karen comes face to face with her kidnapper. Final appearance of Cathy Geary (Lisa Hartman), who is removed from the opening credits in the following episode.

=== Season 8 (1986–87) ===
No. overall	No. in season	Title	Directed by	Written by	Original release date	Rating/share (households)
161	1	"Just Disappeared – Part 1"	Joseph Scanlan	Bernard Lechowick	September 18, 1986	18.4/30
Karen's kidnapping continues. The police tap the phone at Karen's. The kidnapper takes Karen from the cellar up to a furnished room and locks her in. Val finds Ben at home after he decides not to go on tour with Cathy. Greg tells Peter that he is not going to clean up Empire Valley until Lotus Point has gone bankrupt. Peter tells Jill who tells Gary. Ben goes to meet a female called Jean who is a spy and is using a boutique as a cover. They kiss. She asks him to spy on Greg. He says he does not do that any more. She tells him he is finished with it when 'they' say he is. The kidnapper tells Karen that she has not been kidnapped, just disappeared.
162	2	"Distant Echoes – Part 2"	Nick Havinga	Diana Kopald Marcus	September 18, 1986	18.4/30
Gary asks Greg why the arsenic in the water is increasing. Ben tells Jean he is not interested in her offer. Gary tells Abby he will run against Peter for the state senate to put pressure on Greg. Gary's campaign gets under way supported by Jill. Peter asks Jill why she is running the campaign against her brother, she says he is changed and she is only interested in one thing now, Gary. Laura asks Greg if he knows anything about Karen's disappearance. Karen's kidnapper gets her to cut her hair.
163	3	"Reunion II"	Joseph Scanlan	Lynn Marie Latham	September 25, 1986	14.8/23
Mack hears that Karen's car has been found. Abby tells Peter she wants him to win the election though she is supporting Gary publicly. Karen's kidnapper says he is not doing this to her, but to her husband. He says that when he was in prison he had no contact with his wife for a year and he wants Mack to feel what he did. He also mentions how much Karen looks like his wife. Jean tells Ben he should be on Greg's side in the election campaign. Greg tells his campaign team that they need people like Ben on their side. Karen asks the kidnapper what happened to his wife, he says he did not find her until she had died. Greg watches a broadcast of Ben saying he thinks Greg will clean up the pollution. Then he gets a visitor, Phil Harbert, who he went to law school with, who turns out to be Karen's kidnapper.
164	4	"Past Tense"	Nick Havinga	Sandra Smith Allyn	October 2, 1986	14.7/22
Phil asks Greg if he sees much of Mack. Mack tells the police to say publicly that they have got the kidnapper's fingerprints from Karen's car and an arrest is imminent. They do and word gets back to Phil. A flashback shows how Mack and Phil fell out. Phil lets slip Karen's name to Greg who figures out what is going on and tells him he better undo it before tomorrow. Lilimae tells Mack to call his daughter cause it will mean something to her. On the campaign trail, Gary reveals his shortcomings so that there are no surprises. He also challenges Peter to uncover what Greg has been up to. Phil tells Karen that if there is no evidence they cannot convict him of anything. Karen tries to find hidden exits from the room. Phil sets fire to the house. Brian Austin Green replaces Bobby Jacoby in the recurring role of Brian Cunningham.
165	5	"Slow Burn"	David Jacobs	Joel J. Feigenbaum	October 9, 1986	17.7/26
Karen realises the house is on fire and tries to put out the fire at her door. Greg tries to trace Phil's car and finds it registered in a false name and goes searching for his address in his car. Karen pulls up the floorboards to escape the fire. Eventually she finds a window and breaks it to escape. Phil sees the house explode into a fireball. Phil finds Karen running on the road, tries to run her down and crashes the car. Karen hides in the bush. Greg finds the burned out house. Abby blackmails Peter to back off attacking Gary's campaign. In daylight Karen finds Phil asleep on his car and runs off to a local farmhouse, where he catches up with her. She hides in a barn. He starts smashing in the door with an axe when Greg arrives. Greg tells him to head back east. Mack gets a call from a sheriff about Karen. Mack and Karen are reunited. Karen returns home.
166	6	"For Appearance's Sake"	Joseph Scanlan	Bernard Lechowick	October 16, 1986	16.7/25
Laura is finding out more about Karen's abduction than Greg wants to know about. Karen finds out about Mack's daughter. Karen searches photofits. Olivia is given a warning. Olivia warns off Jill. Karen meets Paige. Gary tells Abby that Olivia was suspended from school. Olivia starts smoking pot again. Laura show Greg photofits of Karen's kidnapper. Greg puts Peter back in line. Olivia is warned by Abby not to use her as her excuse. Lilimae is suspicious of Paige. Mack is told that Phil Harbert was put onto the police by Greg Sumner. Phil phones Greg and asks for help. Greg says he does not even know him. Abby and Peter sleep together, Gary walks in on them, he asks Abby which tie would look better on camera. He tells Peter he will be late for the debate if he does not hurry up. Gary is phoned when Olivia is locked up by the police. Gary is late for the debate with Peter. Phil turns up at Greg's office. Phil points out a fact to Greg. Karen and Mack show up in Greg's outer office.
167	7	"All Over But the Shouting"	Robert Becker	Dianne Messina & Lou Messina	October 23, 1986	15.6/23
Mack and Karen accuse Greg. Mack says he'll find everything out and put Greg away. Jean is waiting at home for Ben, he tells her to get out. Greg convinces Phil to come onto the payroll rather than turn them both in to the police. Peter publicly questions Gary's campaign. Jean wants Ben to back Peter's campaign. Greg tells Phil to stay put until he can get him to Hong Kong. Laura tells Karen and Mack how she thought about Karen on the night she escaped from her kidnappers because Greg was away all night. Mack questions the police about Greg. Ben endorses Peter on TV. Abby is upset about it. Gary tells Jill he is not surprised that Abby let the broadcast go ahead. Mack checks out Greg's tyres (which Greg has changed). Phil is trapped in his hotel room waiting for Greg's call. Paige buys Michael some clothes. She comes onto him, he backs off but succumbs in the end. Olivia blames herself for Gary losing the election. Phil orders a pizza and gets recognised. Greg arranges to meet him and Laura thinks he did a good thing calling the police. The pizza delivery guy calls Mack.
168	8	"Pressure Points"	Nick Havinga	Dianne Messina & Lou Messina	October 30, 1986	15.4/23
Greg tells Phil to wait for him at a phone booth. The police surround his hotel room. He sees the police but waits in the phone booth across the street denying people access to it. Greg shows up but drives off when people recognise Phil. Phil runs into the road and gets run over. Mack tells him not to die because he needs to know why he kidnapped Karen, then says he is going to then kill him. Phil gets taken to hospital. The doctors tell him he is dying. Phil tells Mack that Greg put him up to the kidnapping and dies. Mack tells Karen that it was all Phil and that he lied about Greg. Sylvia wants $5,000 more a month from Peter to keep her mouth shut. She tells him to ask Abby for the money. Greg notices Paige for the first time. The pharmacist tells Peter that too many of Sylvia's Beta Blockers could cause cardiac arrest. Peter tells Greg that he does not care about being senator. Abby threatens Peter and he tells her that she is threatening her share of what is his. Peter increases the number of Sylvia's pills.
169	9	"Brothers and Mothers"	Robert Becker	Diana Kopald Marcus	November 6, 1986	15.7/23
Peter is still adding to Sylvia's pills. Michael and Paige sleep together. Greg tells Peter to be prudent and nothing will stand between them and the White House. Karen, Mack, Eric and Michael agree that Paige should move in with them. Val's book gets optioned by a TV Network. Abby tells Peter to follow Greg's advice. Eric finds Michael and Paige together. Eric calls Michael stupid and they fight. Karen finds the mess and wants to know what happened. Eric says it was his fault that they had a fight but refuses to say why. Paige moves in. Jean tells Ben to just give out the facts on Greg, but she knows more than he does. Peter gets more pills for Sylvia but flushes them down the toilet. Jean tells her lover that it was hard enough to get Ben to spy on Greg, imagine how he is going to react when he finds out his real assignment is to kill him.
170	10	"Over the Edge"	Nick Havinga	Lynn Marie Latham	November 13, 1986	14.2/21
Lilimae tells Val that she does not trust Paige. Peter gets Jill out of being in bed with Gary to tell her that he cannot believe he almost killed Sylvia. Ben turns up looking for Sylvia and wonders what the senator and his opponent's campaign manager are doing together. Gary tells Jill she should just dump Peter and not be his shoulder to cry on. Mack tells Paige that her hotel called and one of her cheques bounced. She takes some jewellery to sell. Jean scratches Greg's car to get his insurance information from him. Ben and Mack discuss Jill and Peter and think she was lobbying him. Abby phones Peter and lets him know that Sylvia is with her and at the ranch she tells him that Sylvia knows he was trying to kill her. Abby tells him to leave, then Gary does. Peter suggests they fight about it and Gary says he'll just knock out all his teeth and break both his arms. Peter leaves. Greg tells Peter that moving Sylvia to a clinic would please him, no end. Sylvia lets Abby know that it is in her best interests to make sure she is looked after. Jean finds Greg at a restaurant and they start chatting. Gary and Abby reminisce and have sex. Gary gives Jill an ultimatum to stop seeing Peter. Jill tells Peter that she trusts Gary enough to tell him that they are brother and sister. They argue and Jill falls down a hillside.
171	11	"A Turn of Events"	Kate Swofford Tilley	Lawrence Kasha & Michael Filerman	November 20, 1986	20.0/34
Peter panics with Jill at the foot of the hillside and drives off but he stops and drives back. Abby tells Sylvia that she will get her a lawyer. 'It'll help her sleep better at night'. Ben wonders if Galveston millions put Peter in office. Abby tells him there will be no skeletons in Peter's closet. Abby tells Ben "why does not we wait until Hollister does something newsworthy". Peter reports Jill's accident. Paige buys a VCR for Mack and Karen, Mack does not read the instruction manual. Mack hears about Jill. Karen calls Gary. The police presume it was attempted suicide. Ben phones Greg wondering if Peter has a comment. Greg phones Peter's answering machine and tells him to call, immediately. Greg questions Peter. He tells Peter not to underestimate the press. Jean tells Ben that the timing is right, that is what they have been waiting for. Greg tells Peter that he will talk to Ben. Sylvia sees a lawyer who then sees Abby and gives her Sylvia's letter which was to be released in the event of anything strange happening to her. Lilimae finds out that Karen does not trust Paige either. Gary questions Peter about his involvement with Jill. Karen finds Michael and Paige sleeping together. Greg questions Ben. Sylvia gives a special letter to Olivia for safe keeping. Karen tells Mack about Paige and Michael. Abby turns up at the hospital to see Gary and they overhear the medical team talking about Jill's pregnancy as they wheeled her into emergency surgery. A caller tells Ben that Jill was with Peter when the accident happened.
172	12	"Touch and Go"	Lorraine Senna Ferrara	Joel Okmin & Tom Citrano	November 27, 1986	13.9/26
Ben tells Peter he has an eye witness who saw Peter at the scene of Jill's accident. Gary and Peter hear that Jill lost her baby in the accident. Karen tells Paige that she does not think it was a good idea for her and Michael to sleep together. Paige tells her it will not happen again. Mack talks to Michael. Jean tells Ben that if he buries Peter with the story she will disappear. Abby tells Peter she cannot kill the story. Greg tells Peter to avoid lying. Michael tells Karen he is in love with Paige. Paige tells Mack that it was not love with Michael and that it is over between them. Paige gives Mack a letter to him from her mother. Greg introduces Ben and Mack to the eyewitness who saw Peter at the scene of Jill's accident. The witness turns out to be bogus. Jean tells Ben that the witness was never intended to stand up in court and that they were just starting a rumour to see what it would turn into. Paige and Michael sleep together again. Mack and Ben check the library of police tapes of 911 calls looking to find Peter's call but the tape is missing. Greg has the tape at home. Jill regains consciousness but asks to see Peter not Gary.
173	13	"The Inside Man"	Paul Tucker	Linda Salzman	December 4, 1986	16.7/28
Jill tells Peter she will pretend that he was not at the accident, but when she tells people their relationship is over that she will mean it. Greg writes Peter's will which Peter refuses to sign. Lilimae and Val find cash in Ben's pocket that Jean gave to him. Ben lies to Val about the money. Abby tells Peter that his so called Mother is now staying with his so called brother. She tells him that he could just say that Jill is his sister to get him off the hook but that he cannot be Greg's brother if Jill is his sister. Greg offers Ben a job. Olivia passes her driving test. Paige meets Peter (who she has been reading about in a magazine). Ben tells Mack he is sorry he asked for his opinion about working with Greg. Karen tells Val that the letter Mack got from Anne was not from Anne but was written by someone else. Jean wants Ben to take the job with Greg. Paige goes to dinner with Peter instead of meeting of meeting with Michael. Karen and Mack wonder what else Paige has been lying about. A gravestone is shown with Paige's name on it.
174	14	"Gifts"	Nicholas Sgarro	Bernard Lechowick	December 11, 1986	17.3/28
Karen tells Val that Paige's presence has had a devastating impact on her family. Paige lies to Michael about her date with Peter. Michael tells Eric, Karen and Mack that he cannot live his life with their interference and will be moving out as soon as he can. Ben moves into his office working for Greg and Peter. Michael asks Olivia for the lend of money, which she does not have. Abby and Gary buy Olivia a new sports car. Paige hangs up the phone on a return call to Karen from Mr Winston, Paige's grandparents. Peter apologises to Ben. Jean's lover asks her what will happen when Ben finds out that she is not CIA. She says they will just have to up the stakes. Ben buys ponies for the twins. Michael sees Paige with Peter at the Mall after he bought her a gift. Val tells Karen that Laura is pregnant. Olivia takes Lilimae for a drive in her new car. Michael decides not to move out. Mr. Winston phones Karen and thinks it a sick joke that she suggests Paige is still alive. Olivia and Lilimae have a crash in the car.
175	15	"Truth Will Out"	Timma Ramon	Scott Hamner	December 18, 1986	16.9/28
Karen tells Mack that the real Paige is dead. Olivia tells Abby, Val and Ben that the accident was not her fault. Karen tells Paige that she does not believe she is who she says she is. Lilimae asks to see Abby in the hospital. She tells Abby that she found some white powder on the floor of Olivia's car, she gives the bag of it to Abby. Olivia tells Abby it was not hers. Olivia tells Lilimae that what she found was not hers. Gary finds the photo album of Jill's that names her as Dorothy Simpkins and that mentions Peter referring to her as his sister. Jill asks Gary to get married. Abby will not give Olivia her allowance. Greg tells Laura he is not happy about their 'happy accident'. Paige tells Michael that she really loved him. Karen finds a newspaper article about Paige's death. Abby follows Olivia in her car. Abby finds Olivia buying white powder. Mack phones Mr. Winston and finds out that Anne Matheson is still alive.
176	16	"The Unraveling"	Nicholas Sgarro	Dianne Messina & Lou Messina	January 1, 1987	18.9/30
Mack tells Karen that the real Paige is dead and Anne is alive. Abby gets Olivia to hand over all her drugs. Karen and Mack confront Paige. Karen tells Mack she does not want Paige staying with them any longer as she does not know who she is. Olivia tells her friend how she let Abby find baking soda, knowing she would not know the difference. Olivia tries to get money from refunded clothes, which fails. Jill finally tells Gary that Peter is her brother. He tells her he wants to marry her. Mack gets Mr Winston to confront Paige. Abby gets Olivia to do a urine test. Greg discovers that Jean and Ben were at college together. Abby attends a police lecture on kid's cocaine use. Olivia tries to start selling cocaine. Abby tells Olivia she is going to lock her in with her.
177	17	"No Miracle Worker"	Kate Swofford Tilley	Bernard Lechowick	January 8, 1987	19.4/31
Abby sleeps in Olivia's room to stop her using drugs. She then smashes the bathroom door in when Olivia locks it. Finding Olivia has hidden drugs in the bathroom, she removes the bathroom door and tells Olivia she will no longer have any privacy at all. Olivia gets Brian to pick up some schoolwork books from her friends, but they contain drugs. Olivia takes Abby's keys but she finds out and they fight. Abby gets Olivia's room wired up by a security firm so she cannot go out. When Abby finds out how Olivia is using Brian to bring her drugs, Olivia tells Abby that the dealers are expecting their money or they will take it out on Brian. Brian returns home with bruises which horrifies Olivia so much that she finally gives up all of her hidden drugs to Abby and agrees to get clean. Meanwhile, Mack goes East to see Anne. First appearance of Anne Matheson (recurring guest star Michelle Phillips).
178	18	"My True Love"	Lorraine Senna Ferrara	Lynn Marie Latham	January 15, 1987	18.9/31
Olivia finally attends one of Gary's AA meetings. Jean gets Ben to bug Greg's office, but Greg finds it. Mack and Anne miss their flight to L.A. Olivia apologises to Brian. Abby tells Gary the divorce settlement is not enough. Anne and Mack get back to Knots Landing, but Paige has left and turned up at Peter's. Ben hacks Greg's computer for Jean.
179	19	"Never Trick a Trickster"	Joel Coppoletta	Alan Goldfein	January 29, 1987	18.8/30
Greg shows Ben the bug he found. Paige returns. Jean follows Greg's computer. Greg discovers the hack on his investments. Abby and Gary haggle. Jean tells her brokers to buy. Laura questions Greg about their unborn baby. Paige tells Anne she is not going back with her. She tells Mack and Karen. Peter tells Ben that he thinks it is embarrassing that Greg is paranoid about people hacking his business dealings. Ben informs Jean. Paige leaves Peter's. Anne tells Karen that she is staying in Knots Landing as long as Paige is. Jean tells Ben his assignment is to kill Greg.
180	20	"A Plan of Action"	Kate Swofford Tilley	Lawrence Kasha	February 5, 1987	16.1/25
Ben refuses to co-operate with Jean, but she implies that his family will also suffer. Val tells Ben that someone tried to run her off the road. Paige takes a job at Lotus Point. Ben lets Val know about his past as an industrial spy. Greg suggests Laura should maybe go back to the cul-de-sac. Peter and Olivia meet. Ben picks up Val, Lilimae and the kids and they prepare to leave town so they will be out of danger, but Jean knows their every move and follows them in her car.
181	21	"Survival of the Fittest"	Michael Preece	William Devane	February 12, 1987	17.7/29
Ben tells Jean he wants $1 million to kill Greg. Laura moves back to Knots Landing. Greg leaves a message for Laura saying that he hopes their child will be more of her than of him. Ben gets Mack to invite him to a ball game where he tells him what is going on. Mack says he will help them. Everyone attends the opening of a club at Lotus Point. Greg agrees to meet Ben at the office to pick up some papers. Greg and Laura reconcile. Greg shows up at the office, Ben points a gun at him and explains the situation and asks him to find a way out of it. Ben tells him to write a suicide note. Gary and Jill announce to Val and Karen that they are getting married. Val runs off. A gunshot is heard in Ben's office.
182	22	"In Mourning"	Nicholas Sgarro	Alan Goldfein	February 19, 1987	16.9/26
Jean tells her colleague that Greg is dead, that she heard it happening and saw a body bag leaving. Val and the kids are brought home in a van and bodyguards posing as construction workers to protect them move into the house. Val tells Karen that Ben is on a business trip. Jean threatens Val. Jean leaks a story to a newspaper that Greg is dead which everybody reads. Abby tells Peter he had better be prepared to take over Galveston Industries. Jean shows up at Greg and Laura's place just as Peter stops by to make plans on divvying up Greg's belongings. Peter makes a statement to the press in which he tries to say as little as possible about Greg's disappearance. Val goes to see Laura and Greg shows up. Val wonders if Ben is dead.
183	23	"Nightmare"	Bill Duke	Dianne Messina & Lou Messina	March 5, 1987	17.5/29
Jean's superior tells her she needs to kill Greg. Greg tells Mack that he will handle Jean and that they should handle her buddy. Greg tells Peter that he does not like him trying to take his empire every time his back is turned. Greg buys Jean a drink. Val goes looking for a gun. Mack punches Jean's superior and the bodyguards drive off with him. Jean tells Greg she is sentimental about resurrections. Val finds and takes Gary's gun. Lilimae tells Gary and Karen about Jean and her clothing store. Mack tells Karen everything about what has been going on with Greg and Ben. Greg tells Jean all her friends have been neutralised when she pulls a knife on him. He pulls a gun on her. Mack and a cop bust in and arrest Jean. Val breaks into Jean's store and almost shoots a cleaning woman by accident. Val gets home to find Ben waiting. Ben has a nightmare about Jean shooting Val. This episode features the famous quote from Abby - "Jill, let the second Mrs. Ewing give the soon-to-be third Mrs. Ewing a friendly warning: the first Mrs. Ewing does not go away. Ever.".
184	24	"Neighborly Conduct"	Lawrence Kasha	Lynn Marie Latham	March 12, 1987	15.7/26
Anne moves into Laura's house and Karen is not happy about it. Ben confronts Greg about him sending Jean out of the country rather than putting in her prison and Greg fires him. Gary tries to take Jill to get married but she is not sure because of his relationship with Val. Anne invites Al Stahler to dinner with her and Karen and Mack. Olivia becomes a spokeswoman at the Student Council. Peter changes his plans to join Abby and Olivia. Abby manipulates Peter away from Paige to stay with her, Paige stays with Olivia. Karen tells Anne that she does not stand a chance with Mack. Paige tells Peter that Abby is using him and that Olivia has a letter from Sylvia, only to be opened in the event of her untimely death. A package is delivered to Anne which ends up at the Mackenzies. Ben obsesses about Jean, but Mack tells him that she is still in Paraguay.
185	25	"Deadly Combination"	Beth Brickell	David Marlow	March 26, 1987	16.1/27
Val goes to Greg's to question him about Jean. Laura comes in and Val tries to apologize to her but Laura is angry at her over the incident with Jean and tells her to leave. Ben tells Val that they have to move. Val tells Ben she will not touch his 'blood money'. Karen questions Mack about his dinner with Anne. Val discovers Ben on the lawn when she goes out to collect the morning paper. Abby gets Peter to appoint Olivia as a drugs advisor. Peter carries on with Paige but asks her about Olivia. Val and Ben get a security alarm fitted but later panics when Lilimae sets it goes off. Karen tells Mack she wants Anne to leave. Mack tells Anne that he loves Karen, not her. Anne phones Mack to arrange a farewell breakfast as she is leaving, but then writes a suicide note to him and takes some pills.
186	26	"Our Secret"	David Jacobs	John Leasure	April 2, 1987	17.9/29
Anne lies unconscious. Mack phones to cancel their breakfast but gets no answer. Paige tells Peter that Olivia is in love with him. Ben gets Mack to burgle his house to demonstrate a new alarm system to Lilimae and Val. Mack visits Anne and sees her unconscious through the window when she does not answer the door. He smashes the window and gets her to hospital. Peter has dinner with Abby, Olivia and Brian then sleeps with Abby. Ben gets furious when Lilimae turns the alarms off and does not reactivate them. Mack does not know what to do about Anne. Olivia tells Michael about Peter. He warns her off, she will not listen. Greg informs Peter of Sylvia's death. Michael tells Karen about Olivia and Peter and Karen tries to warn Abby. Gary and Jill discover Peter at the airport picking up Sylvia's remains. Olivia and Peter exchange gifts, they kiss.
187	27	"Breakup"	Joe Coppoletta	Dianne Messina & Lou Messina	April 9, 1987	16.4/27
Mack and Karen pick up Anne from the hospital. Olivia tells Abby about her kiss with Peter. Gary tells Peter to invite Jill to Sylvia's funeral. Paige tells Olivia that Peter's mother died and tries to get Olivia to read Sylvia's letter. Ben goes to ask Abby for his job back but changes his mind. Sylvia's funeral takes place and Abby discovers Peter kissing Olivia. She warns Greg to get Peter back in line or she will go to the press about them not being brothers. Mack hears Anne on the phone to Karen telling her she was trying to wake him up about his life. Peter tells Greg about the letter Olivia has from Sylvia. Olivia goes to Peter's apartment and sees Paige. She walks off and posts Sylvia's letter to Gary. Anne tells Mack she is heading out East again but tells him that Paige's real father is Greg.
188	28	"Parental Guidance"	Nick Havinga	Lawrence Kasha & Michael Filerman	April 30, 1987	16.0/27
Abby asks Gary not to read the letter Olivia sent him. He agrees. Laura gives birth to a baby girl. Greg tells Mack he is not Paige's father. Peter tells Abby he wants to marry her, not Paige. Abby tells him to ditch Paige, which he does but then Abby ditches him. Ben thanks Gary for stepping aside regarding the twins. Jill intercepts Gary's mail from Olivia and burns it. Mack tells Paige that he is not her father and that Greg is. She cries and says Anne was just being vindictive, but thinks that Peter must've known, which was why he broke it off with her. Ben leaves for an assignment in South America.
189	29	"Do Not Fold, Spindle, or Mutilate"	Joseph Scanlan	Lynn Marie Latham	May 7, 1987	16.3/27
Laura and Greg name their baby Margaret Katherine and call them Meg. Greg tells Paige that he is not her father. Abby fires Paige but Karen rehires her. Ben phones Val and tells her that he'll keep in touch with her as he is on the move. Greg tells Peter to settle down with someone. Peter thanks Jill for burning Sylvia's letter but she throws him out. Val phones Ben's news service who have no listing of him. Olivia confronts Paige about Peter, but Paige tells her about Peter and Abby. Olivia shouts at Abby about her involvement with Peter. Now enemies, Paige and Abby have a confrontation. Paige and Peter argue at Lotus Point and she throws plates at him. After vigorously washing her hands, Abby comes out of the bathroom at Lotus Point to find Olivia leaning over Peter's dead body. They look at each other questioningly. Final appearance of Ben Gibson (Douglas Sheehan).
190	30	"Cement the Relationship"	Nick Havinga	Bernard Lechowick	May 14, 1987	18.7/32
Abby tells Olivia to go home, change clothes and act normal. Abby frantically hides Peter's body. Olivia is distraught and goes to see Gary but will not tell him anything. Val is certain Ben will never come back home. Abby buries Peter's body at Lotus Point where a children's playground is about to be built. She notices Peter's car and takes it to the airport where she leaves it. Gary questions Abby about Olivia's behaviour. Mack tells Paige that he called Anne and she admitted that he is her father but Paige remains unsure. The following day, the cement foundation gets poured over Peter's body, but Abby's relief turns to horror when Karen later points out a large crack in the cement which may mean it has to be dug up.

=== Season 9 (1987–88) ===
No. overall	No. in season	Title	Directed by	Written by	Original release date	Rating/share (households)
191	1	"Missing Persons"	Joseph Scanlan	Lynn Marie Latham	September 24, 1987	15.2/27
Peter's absence is noticeable. Val is distraught when she does not hear from Ben but she makes amends with Laura. Greg kisses Paige to prove he is not her father. Experts say the crack at the Lotus Point playground is a structural problem and they will have to replace the concrete. Abby objects but is overruled by Karen and Gary. Al, a delivery man, begins to hang around Mack's office, much to his secretary Peggy's disliking. Val tells Lilimae she is not sure Ben will be coming back. Mack and Paige discover that they are both allergic to cantaloupe so he must be her father. The cement is dug up and Peter's body is discovered. Douglas Sheehan is removed from the opening credits.
192	2	"The Trouble with Peter"	Nick Havinga	Parke Perine	October 1, 1987	14.8/25
Karen closes Lotus Point for a few days. Gary tells Jill about Peter's body being found. Mack offers Jill the chance to be involved in the investigation. Greg wants to know if Abby is going to inherit anything from Peter. A detective begins questioning everyone about their involvement with Peter. The police find Olivia's locket on Peter's body, but does not know who the initials "OC" belong to. A memorial service for Peter is held. Gary overhears Olivia telling Abby that she does not want to go to the service. Gary tells Abby he knows that Olivia killed Peter, she slaps him and leaves with Olivia.
193	3	"Under Pressure"	Nicholas Sgarro	Bernard Lechowick	October 8, 1987	16.5/28
The police decide to talk to Olivia. Greg tells Abby he will see that she is convicted for Peter's murder rather than have her inherit what is his. Olivia turns up at Val's avoiding the police. Karen tells Val to phone Gary but she gets no answer when she does. Mack is suspicious of Paige's phone calls to Peter the day he died. In a lighthearted moment, Al insists to Peggy that he can drink all the coffee he likes since the office is taxpayer funded. Peggy believes that Al is homeless. Olivia talks to the police. Mack lets Al use his office but he invites loads of homeless people to stay in it. The police get fibers from Olivia's jumper and arrest her, but Abby tells the police that she killed Peter, not Olivia.
194	4	"Half-Truths"	Nick Havinga	Joel J. Feigenbaum	October 15, 1987	15.8/27
Abby tells the police that Peter's death was an accident. The police take both Abby and Olivia in for questioning. Olivia and Brian stay with Karen. Abby gets out on bail. Paige is having nightmares. Gary finally gets Olivia to admit that she thinks Abby killed Peter. Gary talks to Abby and then Mack. Abby and Olivia talk and realise that they both thought each other had killed Peter. Laura visits Richard as Richard has not seen them in a long time and ends up leaving the boys with him. Mack suspects Paige. He asks her to tell him what really happened the day Peter died.
195	5	"There are Smiles"	Nicholas Sgarro	Lynn Marie Latham	October 22, 1987	13.4/24
Paige is revealed as Peter's killer. She tells Mack that his death was an accident. Abby retracts her confession. Jill tells Gary she cannot handle his relationships with his ex-wives any more. Val buys a sports car. Al gets under Lilimae's skin. The police decide not to prosecute Paige. Val argues with Gary about the twins. Abby tells Greg that he'll need to pay her what Peter owed her. Mack wants Paige to apologise to everyone for what she put them through over Peter's death. Greg tells Paige she is lucky Mack is her father and not him. Laura tells Karen she is resigning from Lotus Point. Paige tells Abby she is sorry that Abby ever got off the murder charge and that none of it would have happened if Abby had not made Peter break up with her. Abby tells Paige that she put her and Olivia through a lot of trouble over it and sooner or later she will make her pay for it. Laura suggests to Greg that she may not have much time left to worry about things. Final appearance of Peter Hollister (Hunt Block).
196	6	"The Gift of Life"	Kate Swofford Tilley	Bernard Lechowick	October 29, 1987	14.8/24
Laura tells Greg she has an inoperable brain tumour. He takes her from doctor to doctor looking for a different diagnosis. Laura tells him she is not seeing any more specialists. Greg says he is not going to Meg's christening because he is seen his last church. People hold a farewell party for Laura at Lotus Point. Greg visits a doctor Laura refused to see. His car gets towed away and he wanders the streets. Meg gets christened while Greg sits in his car. He eventually goes into the church. Laura decides to go to a clinic alone, Greg says she is going there to die without him and it is not being fair to him. She says she does not want him to see her die. She phones Karen to say goodbye and gives Meg to Greg and leaves for the clinic alone. Final appearance of Laura Avery Sumner (Constance McCashin), although she remains in opening credits for next few episodes and returns in a video message after her death.
197	7	"Say Uncle"	Robert Becker	Erica Byrne	November 5, 1987	15.2/26
Gary is upset when he discovers Val is holding a birthday party for the twins and did not tell him. Gary tells Val that the twins can call him "uncle" as long as he can see them, but she refuses. Greg interviews prospective nannies for Meg but tells them the position is temporary until Meg's mother gets back. Gary tells Lilimae that he is the twins father. Val tells Lilimae that Gary is unreliable and she does not need any help to raise them. Michael rescues a drowning girl at the beach. Lilimae takes the twins to see Gary in the park. Al and Lilimae become friends. She discovers that he lives in his car.
198	8	"Love In"	Kate Swofford Tilley	Dianne Messina	November 12, 1987	14.3/24
Abby's first love Charles Scott shows up to book a convention at Lotus Point. Karen and Abby have recollections of Charles. Michael takes Jody (who he saved at the beach) home to meet Karen and Mack. Eric returns with his new wife, Linda. Karen is not thrilled with either Jody or Linda. Val lets Gary see the kids. They kiss afterwards. Abby has dinner with Charles. They tell each other what they have been up to since they were together. First appearance of Linda Fairgate (recurring guest star Lar Park Lincoln).
199	9	"Flight of the Sunbirds"	Roy Campanella II	Bernard Lechowick	November 19, 1987	15.5/26
Al asks Lilimae to marry him. Val and Gary spend a day with the kids. Lilimae says they should live together, not get married. Abby gets stood up by Charles which brings back the anger and hurt she felt years ago when she learned he was getting married. Karen throws a reception at Lotus Point for Eric and Linda. Gary explains to a curious Abby that he and Val are only there together because of the children. Abby takes great pleasure in creating doubt in Jill's mind about Gary's relationship with Val. Linda works at endearing herself to Karen. Lilimae and Al drive off together. Greg receives word that Laura has died. Final appearance of Lilimae Clements (Julie Harris).
200	10	"Noises Everywhere – Part 1"	David Jacobs	Bernard Lechowick	December 3, 1987	14.7/24
Everyone gathers at Greg's after Laura's death including Richard Avery. When Richard discovers that nobody went to the clinic with Laura when she was dying, he takes his anger out on the others. Gary tells Val that he respected how Laura turned her life around. Val argues with Karen about how Karen did not tell her Laura was dying. Richard wants to know why Greg keeps Peter's ashes on the coffee table. Greg says he always wanted to be the centre of attention. Laura's remains are sent to the wrong mortuary. Mack says Laura is determined not to come back. Everybody laughs. Mack helps Greg pick out a casket for Laura. Julie Harris and Constance McCashin are removed from the opening credits. John Pleshette returns as Richard in a guest role for the next two episodes. This episode is largely improvised.
201	11	"Noises Everywhere – Part 2"	David Jacobs	Lynn Marie Latham	December 10, 1987	16.6/29
Everyone is gathered at Greg's after Laura's funeral. Jill finds out from Richard that Peter's ashes are on Greg's coffee table and she steals them. Jody makes too many assumptions of her place with Michael. Jill asks Paige how she can sleep at night after Peter's death and then whacks her in the back with her bag which contains the urn of Peter's ashes. Mack takes his frustrations out on Karen, Michael and Paige. Jill scatters Peter's ashes off a mountainside. Laura's close friends watch video messages she left and Val and Karen cry watching them. Greg watches the rest of the tape by himself and cries. Julie Harris and Constance McCashin return to the opening credits for this episode only, although only McCashin appears via video message. This episode is largely improvised.
202	12	"Weak Moment"	Lorraine Senna Ferrara	John Leasure	December 17, 1987	15.3/26
Gary and Val sleep together. Greg discovers Paige is the assistant at the art gallery. Gary tells Jill that he does not love her. Jill blames Val and tells her that she is leaving Gary. Charles and Abby avoid phoning each other, then he shows up at Abby's home with a gift when she is out and Olivia invites him to stay for dinner. Val throws Gary out. Abby tells Charles that she cannot accept a gift from him, but he asks for a second chance. Jill leaves Gary but later returns. Mack and Karen plan a trip to Tahiti until Greg turns up looking for a babysitter for Meg. Charles takes Abby for a drive, they end up sleeping together.
203	13	"Only 'Til Friday"	Lawrence Kasha	James Stanley	January 7, 1988	17.0/28
Greg phones Mack from home whilst pretending to be in New York. Mack and Karen suffer sleepless nights with Meg crying. A devious Irishman named Johnny Rourke heads to Knots Landing to see his former girlfriend Paige. He steals a credit card from the purse of the passenger sitting next to him on the airplane. Paige delivers Greg's painting and questions why he is not in New York like he told Mack and Karen. He replies "I am in New York." Val tells Gary they should just be ex-husband and wife. Jill tells Gary that she told Val that he is a free man and that Val must not want him any more if she does not want to see him. Charles' wife phones and he decides he has to go back home and leave Abby. A woman named Patricia Williams and her 12-year-old daughter Julie move into Laura's old house. Greg phones Karen to say he has been held up in New York. Johnny buys a gun in a bar. Charles returns to Abby and tells her he loves her. First appearances of Patricia Williams and Johnny Rourke (recurring guest stars Lynne Moody and Peter Reckell).
204	14	"Ties That Bind"	Joe Coppoletta	Lou Messina	January 14, 1988	16.0/26
Johnny asks Paige for $20,000 to keep her secrets but she tells him she no longer has any secrets from her family and tells him to clear off. Johnny introduces himself to Mack as Paige's old boyfriend, and Mack invites him to stay. Charles introduces his wife Judith to Abby when she unexpectedly arrives. Meg starts having convulsions but Patricia quickly diagnoses the problem and helps get them to hospital in time. Mack wonders how she knew what to do, but she says the same thing happened to her own daughter. Paige gets hold of Greg when Mack cannot and Greg joins Mack at the hospital. Johnny lands a job as musician at the local bar. Judith tells Abby that Charles will always come back to her. Meg's convulsions were caused by an ear infection and she recovers. Greg overhears Mack and Karen noticing Meg's first word is 'Mack'. Charles asks Abby to marry him.
205	15	"Another Modest Proposal"	Lorraine Senna Ferrara	Robert Porter	January 21, 1988	16.1/26
Meg returns home with Greg. Abby tells Charles that it is not legal to have two wives at once and tells him to come back when he is told Judith he is divorcing her. Val and Gary argue about the twins. Johnny notices someone, whom he recognises from the bar, acting strangely and breaks into his cabin at Lotus Point and finds a fridge full of money. He takes some and escapes out the back door. He later returns the money and asks the man for a job. Jill tells Gary that he does not have to see the twins on Val's terms as she is a lawyer and can help him. Charles tells Judith that he intends to marry Abby and Abby accepts his proposal. Greg brings Meg back to stay with Karen and Mack after Mack told Karen they would not look after her again. Mack is very pleased to have her back much to Karen's surprise.
206	16	"If Not Now, When?"	Kate Swofford Tilley	Lynn Marie Latham	January 28, 1988	16.4/28
Karen invites the Williamses (now including Pat's husband Frank) to dinner. Judith suggests Charles postpone their divorce until after their joint business successfully concludes. Abby conspires with Greg to disrupt their venture. Val refuses Gary's request to legally acknowledge him as the twins' father. Frank is alarmed to learn Mack is an investigator, and Mack assumes Frank is a cop. Judith secretly records Abby and Greg discussing their scheme and threatens to report them to FCC for insider trading, but Charles ends up giving the tape to Abby. A paranoid Frank destroys his couch when it is delivered a day late. Michael tells Jody he does not love her. First appearance of Frank Williams (recurring guest star Larry Riley).
207	17	"In Too Deep"	Jerome Courtland	James Stanley	February 4, 1988	16.5/27
Olivia is upset when she learns Charles is married and accuses Abby of breaking up his marriage. Frank and Pat scold Julie for allowing herself to be photographed for school pictures. Frank later breaks into the school, steals Julie's pictures, and burns them. Jill and Gary summon Karen for a deposition. Val asks Karen to lie and say she has no knowledge of the twins' biological father. Johnny is attacked after he carries out a mission for his employer. The man Johnny's working for later kills a young woman who mistakenly entered Johnny's room and saw the man with a gun and stacks of money. Paige has a drunken rendezvous with Johnny after Greg shows no interest in her. Karen reveals in the deposition that Gary is the twins' biological father.
208	18	"The Blushing Bride"	Nicholas Sgarro	Lynn Marie Latham	February 11, 1988	17.2/27
Karen becomes suspicious of the Williamses when Pat is at first reluctant to be interviewed by the local newspaper and then later learns that although Pat and Frank consented to the interview, they refused to have their picture taken. Val stubbornly refuses to recant her deposition testimony and acknowledge Gary is the twins' father. She later changes her mind. Charles suggests to Abby that Lotus Point expand the marina and even offers to provide the investment capital for the project. Abby is shocked to learn later that Charles drafted plans for the marina expansion five months earlier. A man named Manny Vasquez and his nephew Harold are both pleased that Charles is making progress on their "plan" for Lotus Point. Charles convinces Olivia that Abby did not break up his marriage. Abby hires a PI to investigate Charles' business dealings and finances. Mack and Karen observe Pat leaving late at night with a woman. First appearance of Harold Dyer (recurring guest star Paul Carafotes).
209	19	"Lawfully Wedded"	Lawrence Kasha	Bernard Lechowick	February 18, 1988	15.5/24
When Mack casually asks Frank about Pat's whereabouts, Frank berates him for spying. Abby's PI cannot find a reason for Charles' interest in Lotus Point. Manny wants the marina completed sooner than Charles has intended. Frank continues to be jumpy and suspicious. Charles offers to give Abby the $2 million needed to complete the marina rather than loan it. Greg has no comment when Paige questions his lack of interest in Meg. Abby and Charles are married in Vegas. Pat returns home and discusses her discomfort at testifying. It is revealed that the family is in the Witness Security Program (WSP). Frank loses his job and explodes at Pat, blaming her impending testimony for destroying their lives. When Frank's suspicions about Mack has the WPP ready to move the family again, Pat refuses. Abby has her marriage to Charles annulled. Manny tells Charles to accept Abby's terms in the annulment. Harold tells Johnny's employer "we're in business."
210	20	"Bouncing Babies"	Nicholas Sgarro	William Devane	February 25, 1988	15.2/23
Olivia berates Abby for breaking up with Charles. Abby moves forward with the marina expansion, offering to loan Lotus Point the $2 million needed. Barbara, Meg's nanny, tells Greg that she is resigning because with Meg at the MacKenzies, she has nothing to do. Greg goes to the MacKenzies and takes Meg back, prompting Mack to criticize his lack of concern for his daughter. Val's lawyer assures her Gary's case will be dismissed. Karen tells Gary she thinks he should be able to see his children. Val accuses Jill of putting Gary up to his custody case in a desperate attempt to keep him. While Johnny pushes for more "quality time" with Paige, she is insistent that it remain casual. Val apologizes to Gary and allows him access to the twins after she hears Mack's fear that his access to Meg will always be dependent on Greg's whims. Karen tries to convince Greg to let her and Mack raise Meg. While at first resisting, Greg eventually turns Meg over to them, saying that he is doing it for Laura and for Meg.
211	21	"A Fair Race"	Lawrence Kasha	Lynn Marie Latham	March 3, 1988	16.7/28
Gary becomes a silent partner in Lotus Point. Harold meets Olivia and takes her out for pizza, to Manny's delight. Harold is surprised to learn Olivia is Abby's daughter. Abby refuses to allow Olivia to continue seeing Harold until she has met him. Manny accompanies Harold to meet with Abby and Olivia and tells Abby he rents yachts. Abby later introduces him to Karen, saying that she believes he can do business with Lotus Point. Mack is surprised that Karen went to Greg and asked him to let them keep Meg. Val apologizes to Karen for her behavior during the conflict with Gary. When Paige is mistaken for Greg's date, he makes it clear that she is too young to be his date. Later, Paige ensures that Greg sees her and Johnny kissing. Jill's plans for a romantic rendezvous with Gary are interrupted by Val and the twins. Separately, Paige and Johnny inquire about "mercurial" Greg from Mack, Karen, and Michael. Johnny shows up to Greg's and ends up getting thrown off one of Greg's horses. Upset that Gary is spending time with the kids, Jill defaces a picture of Bobby and Betsy, then proceeds to get drunk. After Greg hires Paige to acquire art for him, she pulls away from Johnny.
212	22	"Full Disclosure"	Joseph Scanlan	Alan Goldfein	March 10, 1988	17.2/30
In front of the neighbors and kids, Frank pistol whips a construction worker who accidentally breaks their window. Mack reports Frank to the police, but the police decline to act once a "friend" of the family (the WSP contact) shows up. Abby expresses concern that Harold is too old for Olivia and that she does not know enough about him. Harold takes a bracelet from one of Manny's debtors and later gives the bracelet to Olivia. Olivia admits to Harold that she had a drug problem. Frank overhears Julie blaming him for Val changing her mind about letting her babysit. With the twins sleeping over, Gary tells Jill that they should not sleep in the same bed since they are unmarried. Pat leaves to give her final testimony. Her testimony reveals that she is a neurologist who has accused an older colleague of dealing drugs. She tearfully explains the effect her decision to testify has had on her life. She is later stabbed while entering an elevator. Mack theorizes that Frank is a witness under police protection. Pat returns home with her arm in a sling. After watching a news report of a witness being stabbed in D.C., Mack and Karen realize Pat is the witness. Greg has Paige arrange dates for him. Val receives a letter from Ben.
213	23	"Her Letter"	Robert Becker	Bernard Lechowick	March 17, 1988	15.3/27
Val is elated at the prospect that Ben is coming home. Mack fears something may have happened between the time of the letter's mailing in Guatemala and its delivery. Pat thinks Val is not very realistic. Pat and Karen suggest Karen buy a mini skirt, and she shows up for a meeting with Abby and Manny wearing it. Olivia says she will not go to college and will be a traditional stay-at-home woman, the kind Harold wants. Abby expresses concern that Harold and Olivia's relationship is moving too fast. Karen advises Abby to be so overly kind to Harold, Olivia will tire of him. Harold proposes to Olivia. Abby forbids Olivia to see Harold anymore and makes it clear to Manny that his contract with Lotus Point is contingent on him keeping Harold away from Olivia. Paige tells Greg that she is available if he needs dates. Jill continues to drink in response to Gary's newfound preoccupation with being a father to the twins. Gary expresses concern about how Ben's supposed return may affect his access to the twins. Karen is disappointed when Mack shows no concern that Manny flirted with her. Jill negotiates a plea deal for an elderly forger. Later, she forges another letter, this one for Jill and signed by "Ben." Harold and Olivia announce they are eloping.
214	24	"Mother Knows Best"	Joseph Scanlan	Julie Sayres	March 31, 1988	16.5/29
Abby and Manny try to locate Harold and Olivia. Gary thinks Jill is becoming dependent on alcohol. Harold insists to Johnnythat he will marry Olivia no matter the consequence to him. Manny sends a henchmen to stop Harold and Olivia from marrying. Harold reluctantly tells Olivia he does not want to marry her. After a breakfast meeting where Karen shares her life story with Manny, he kisses her. Jill pays a stranger flying to Honduras to mail a letter there that is addressed to Val. Harold tells Olivia that Manny is behind his decision not to marry her. Olivia implores Abby to talk to Manny on their behalf. Abby gives Manny an ultimatum: send Harold away or he will have no deal with Lotus Point. Paige learns about an archaeological dig in Santa Tecla, Mexico that could unearth expensive pre-Columbian art. She convinces Greg to provide funds so that the dig may continue. Paige catches Johnny in bed with another woman in Santa Tecla. Johnny and Paige make up. Karen admits to Pat that Manny kissed her. Jill and Val arrive at a truce. Olivia overhears Manny tell Harold that Abby is the one who wants Harold sent away.
215	25	"With a Heavy Heart"	Michael Preece	Lawrence Kasha	April 7, 1988	16.7/28
Harold leaves town and leaves Olivia depressed. Manny assures Abby that Olivia is unaware that they are responsible for Harold's departure, but Karen later tells her that Olivia does know. Gary sees late night activity at the Lotus Point marina and alerts Mack. Mack questions whether Manny's business is legit, but Karen thinks he is just jealous. Frank and Pat argue about his reluctance to apply for another job. Mack offers him a job tailing Manny. Abby agrees to help Greg engineer a hostile takeover of a company. Val receives a second fake letter from Ben. Jill manipulates old news footage of Ben to leave a voice message from Ben on Val's answering machine. Olivia leaves prized possessions with Brian and Gary and asks Manny to give Harold a letter from her. Manny then gives Abby the letter, which reads like a suicide note.
216	26	"Just Desserts"	Kevin Dobson	Don Mueller & William Devane	April 14, 1988	16.8/28
Manny alerts Harold to Olivia's suicide note and questions whether she is with him. Karen learns Mack hired Frank to spy on Manny. Frank suspects Manny is dealing cocaine. Val puts the answering machine tape aside and labels it "Ben's Tape." Paige realizes her attempt to slow down the highway construction in Santa Tecla has been thwarted. Manny instructs Johnny to return to Santa Tecla and ensure that the highway construction moves forward full speed. Paige accompanies Johnny, secretly taking with her a pre-Columbian artifact she has acquired for Greg. She hatches a plan to bury the artifact so that the archaeological dig will discover it. Olivia is discovered unconscious, having overdosed on sleeping pills. When she awakens, she rejects Abby. Jill covertly steals a spare key in Val's house and has a copy made. When Gary questions the authenticity of "Ben's Tape", Jill swipes it from Val's house. Abby backs out of her deal with Greg. Chava, one of the archaeological workers, spots Paige and Johnny planting the artifact.
217	27	"Discovery"	Lawrence Kasha	James Stanley	April 28, 1988	16.0/27
Paige tries to pay for Chava's silence, but he says he supports her attempt to stop the highway construction and will not expose what she did. Manny tells Johnny to "get rid of" Paige once the artifact's discovery threatens to delay the highway, but questions Johnny's connection to her. Mack tells Karen that Manny is using Lotus Point to run drugs. Gary worries about Val's mental state when "Ben's Tape" is blank. Meanwhile, Jill destroys the actual tape. Gary offers to keep the twins for a few days. Jill calls Val and plays another "Ben" message for her. Abby realizes Charles is the one who brought Manny to Lotus Point. When Abby, Karen, Gary, and Mack go to the authorities, they are asked to pretend as if everything is fine while Manny is investigated. They are later told Manny is working for the government. Greg applauds Paige for her initiative. After Michael confesses he considered suicide after Paige rejected him, Olivia decides to cooperate with her counseling and is able to leave the hospital. Michael accompanies Paige to help with the archaeological dig in Santa Tecla. A reporter arrives in Santa Tecla to inquire about the artifact. In Jill's presence, Val mentions she has not filled a prescription for sleeping pills. Jill takes the prescription and has it filled.
218	28	"The Perfect Alibi"	Kate Swofford Tilley	Lynn Marie Latham	May 5, 1988	15.6/26
Karen, Abby, Gary, and Mack are warned that they Manny will make it look as if they are behind the drug ring at Lotus Point. In Santa Tecla, Manny's goons attempt several methods to scare off the archaeological dig, ultimately succeeding. Mack asks Greg to use his federal contacts to learn why Manny is useful to the government. Greg learns that Manny is not running drugs but weapons. Jill departs for a conference in San Francisco – with a gun. In a wig and using a fake name, she buys a used car and hides the gun under the car's back seat, parking the car at the airport. On her flight, she discusses with a fellow passenger the fact that she has learned a lot about murders in her work as a lawyer. Once in San Francisco, Jill flirts with an efficiency expert at her conference and unbeknownst to him, she slips a mickey in his drink. He later passes out in her hotel room. She then leaves a message on Gary's answering machine that is billed to her hotel room and asks the hotel operator for a wake-up call. Donning a different wig and glasses, she heads to the airport. She encounters several difficulties returning to Los Angeles, but ultimately ends up at Val's. Meanwhile, Val has agreed to join Frank and Pat for a movie while Julie babysits the twins. In Santa Tecla, Johnny keeps Paige from getting into a car with the reporter only seconds before his car explodes.
219	29	"The Perfect Crime"	Joseph Scanlan	Bernard Lechowick	May 12, 1988	17.8/31
Jill puts on gloves and pistol whips Val in her bedroom. She tells Val that she is there to ensure Val kills herself. Val learns that Jill faked the letters and calls from Ben and that her motive for suicide is learning Ben was not coming back home. Jill forces Val to swallow a bottle of sleeping pills. Jill's plan is threatened when Frank and Julie ring Val's doorbell. Then, hiding from view, she forces Val to send Frank and Julie away. Frank later tells Pat that Val acted as if she had a gun to her head. Jill poses an unconscious Val on her bed, checks her pulse, then leaves, satisfied that she has achieved her purpose. She places a note on Mack and Karen's door to check on the twins in the morning, but the wind blows it away. Due to all flights to San Francisco being grounded, Jill has to drive back. In San Francisco, Jill pretends that she and the efficiency expert slept together the previous night. In Santa Tecla, Chava exposes Johnny as Manny's henchman, responsible for getting the dig stopped and the highway built. Johnny accuses Chava of being a DEA agent. Paige chooses to believe Chava and has Michael and Chava tie up Johnny, and the three later board a bus headed for the States. The bus is stopped and they are led away by the police. Separately, Mack and Karen and Gary and Abby come up with plans to stop Manny from getting his next shipment at Lotus Point. Mack and Karen fail to get a news reporter to expose Manny, but Gary and Abby are successful in filling all the slips at Lotus Point's marina, thereby blocking Manny from unloading his next shipment. He calls Karen and promises Michael and Paige's return home only if he is able to unload his shipment at Lotus Point. Val has fallen onto the floor of her bedroom unconscious, reaching for a phone that has been unplugged from the wall.

=== Season 10 (1988–89) ===
No. overall	No. in season	Title	Directed by	Written by	Original release date	Viewers (millions)
220	1	"Suicidal"	Jerome Courtland	Bernard Lechowick	October 27, 1988	24.1
Mack goes to Mexico to search for Michael and Paige. Frank finds an unconscious Val on her bedroom floor. Gary rushes to the hospital and pays for Val's medical care. He calls Jill and notifies her of Val's suicide attempt. When Jill arrives and learns that Val will live, she excuses herself to vomit. Jill later muses to herself that Val is in a psych ward and no one will believe her when she regains consciousness. Fearing Manny may hurt her or Mack, Karen leaves Meg with an unhappy Greg. Harold, Manny, and his goon imprison Mack. They call Karen and force Mack to tell her to allow Manny's shipment to be unloaded. Mack plays on Harold's guilt about Olivia to shake his faith in Manny's promise to release Mack, Michael, and Paige. Later, Mack and Chava attempt to overtake Manny and his goon. Chava and the goon are killed. Harold is forced to kill Manny to save Mack. He tells Mack he does not know where Paige and Michael are. Teri Austin and Nicollette Sheridan are added to the opening credits.
221	2	"Borderline"	Kate Swofford Tilley	Lynn Marie Latham	November 3, 1988	21.5
Johnny engineers Paige and Michael's escape. Mack and Harold team up to find them, too. Val regains consciousness and screams that Jill tried to kill her. Karen refuses to call the police until she has heard news about her family. Mack later calls and tells her Manny is dead. Gary thinks Val's story is a hallucination. Pat does not think the pills Val took would make her hallucinate. Frank calls the police. Val tells her story to a police officer, who then goes to Jill and tells her off the record that she believes Val is disturbed. Greg hires Ted Melcher to work on improving his image with the public. Johnny, Paige, and Michael realize they must exit Mexico under cover, as Manny's people are in cahoots with the government. They link up with a small group of Mexican nationals attempting to cross into the USA. Val sends the twins to stay with Lilimae and Al. Thieves leave Paige, Johnny, Michael and the other nationals locked in an unventilated truck. First appearance of Ted Melcher (recurring guest star Robert Desiderio).
222	3	"Deserted"	Lorraine Senna Ferrara	M.J. Cody & Chuck Bulot	November 10, 1988	21.9
Val leaves the hospital and goes to Karen's because she is afraid to go home alone. Paige, Johnny, and Michael remain trapped in the deserted truck with the other Mexican nationals, one of whom dies. Johnny reveals that he is not Irish and his accent is fake. Mack continues to search for them and eventually frees them. Mack returns with Paige, Johnny, Michael, and Harold to Knots Landing. Harold apologizes to Olivia for leaving her, to Abby's chagrin. Val avoids everyone but eventually pronounces that she did not try to kill herself. She goes home and terrified, stays up all night watching her front door armed with a knife. Drugs are found in the Lotus Point marina. The police later question Karen and Abby but Mack sends them away. A car pulls into the cul-de-sac at night and parks.
223	4	"The Pick-Up Game"	Nicholas Sgarro	Lynn Marie Latham	November 24, 1988	20.2
The man in the car observes Frank and Val talking. Val refuses to leave her house. Frank tells Pat he believes Val and asks her to check Jill's account for the past three months. Julie participates in a spelling bee. Frank expresses concern about her being photographed, unaware that the man who has been observing him in the cul-de-sac is now video recording him and Pat. The man (using the name Ned Donnelly) later visits Pat at the bank to open a new account. Pat and Frank ask Julie to lose the spelling bee to avoid the public recognition. Business at Lotus Point drops off dramatically amid the newspaper report of drugs found on the property. Ted suggests Greg get chummy with the environmentalists. Harold and Johnny discuss potential job prospects. Mack is disillusioned with being middle-aged. Val tells Gary not to come around her anymore so that Jill will leave her alone. Paige skinny dips in Greg's pool.
224	5	"Sex and Violence"	Jerome Courtland	Bernard Lechowick	December 1, 1988	24.2
Paige and Greg make love -- repeatedly. Jill calls Val, asking for Gary. Ned blackmails Frank and Pat with his knowledge of their real identities. He tells Pat to transfer $100,000 from one account into hers and make out the amount in a cashier's check to him. Pat is able to contact Mack without Ned's knowledge. Mack follows him and learns he is an actor. He and Frank devise a ruse to uncover how he knows about the Williamses' real identities. He later reveals he was an orderly at the hospital where Pat was a doctor. While Mack and Frank are working to get to the bottom of things, Karen asks Gary to shelter Pat and Julie. Abby tries to hire Ted to clean up Lotus Point's image. Paige moves some of her things into Greg's place, to his discomfort. Val tries to hire a private investigator, but he refuses to take her money when he disbelieves her story.
225	6	"A Weekend Getaway"	Andre R. Guttfreund	Lynn Marie Latham	December 8, 1988	19.1
Paige assures Greg she has not told Mack that they are sleeping together. Later, Ted tells Greg that being with Paige will not be good for his public image. Harold asks Mack for advice about handling Olivia. Mack suggests he talk to Abby, who tells him to give her time to think about allowing him and Olivia to date again. Gary, Karen, and Val go to San Francisco to check on Jill's alibi. Val finds it suspicious that everyone they ask remembers Jill. One man remembers that Jill was not seen after 8 p.m. Val points out that this fact opens the possibility that what she has been saying about Jill is true. When Gary asks Jill about it later, she admits that she was with a man after 8 p.m. that night. Mack arranges for Pat and Julie's dental records (under their real names) to be matched with a mother and daughter who died in a tragic accident. He says they are now free of the Witness Security Program.
226	7	"The Briar Patch"	Kate Swofford Tilley	Bernard Lechowick	December 15, 1988	22.5
Karen, Gary, and Abby put Lotus Point up for sale and consider offers. Greg phones Abby expressing interest in buying Lotus Point. Karen learns Greg made the offer to Abby but she never told them about it. Secretly, Abby has plans to buy Lotus Point and drill for oil. She also scares off a potential buyer before her offer (through her dummy company, Murakame) is presented to Karen and Gary. Abby offers Harold a job and appears to have turned over a new leaf where he is concerned. Later, though, she plants drugs in his locker at work and he is arrested. Ted comes on to Paige, but she says he is a year too late. Val disbelieves Jill's story about a one-night stand in San Francisco and asks Gary to get the man's name (David). She later tracks him down and he denies sleeping with Jill. Jill meets with David and (with Gary eavesdropping) he confesses to lying to Val because he is married. Lotus Point is sold to Murakame. Abby celebrates.
227	8	"A Fine Romance"	Lawrence Kasha	James Stanley	December 29, 1988	21.3
Paige wants to tell Mack and Karen about them, but he says it is a bad idea. Paige and Greg play strip croquet. Paige and Greg both say "the L word" to each other. Mack asks Greg if he knows who Paige is seeing. Greg takes down the painting he bought for Laura, replacing it with a painting Paige bought him. Greg buys a ring and contemplates marriage, but Ted says that he and Paige would be "political suicide." He later proposes to Abby. Ted thinks the L.A. mayor will resign and suggests Greg is the right candidate for a potential special election. Gary is distant with Jill. Jill threatens Val with a slander suit if she continues to make accusations against her. Gary tells Jill that he no longer wants to be with her but agrees to let her stay until she finds an apartment. Ted tries to schmooze both Paige and Abby. Abby hires a lawyer for Harold but secretly works with the lawyer to undermine his case. Jill privately announces her engagement to Gary. Paige's grandfather dies and she must go to New York.
228	9	"A Many Splendored Thing"	Nicholas Sgarro	John Leasure	January 5, 1989	22.2
In New York, Paige trades barbs with her mother Anne. Anne tells Paige her grandfather left her nothing in his will. Paige insists she needs nothing -- she has Greg's love. Greg begins to avoid Paige's calls from New York. Abby tells Greg she needs time to consider his proposal. Greg spends quality time with Brian to gain Abby's affection. Mack decides to take a leave of absence from work. With both he and Karen home together all day, Mack begins to grate Karen's nerves, and she suggests he go on a vacation, alone. Harold buys a ring for Olivia. Abby tries to discourage Olivia from considering marriage to Harold. Val is determined to get the twins back. Abby accepts Greg's proposal but will keep her own name. Paige returns from New York and falls asleep in Greg's bed, but he lets her sleep alone.
229	10	"Cabin Fever"	Joseph Scanlan	Lynn Marie Latham	January 12, 1989	21.8
Greg avoids Paige. Ted helps Abby and Greg plan their wedding. Greg is uncomfortable when Meg is mentioned as a possible wedding guest. Paige sees the engagement ring and tries it on. Michael indicates he will major in business in college. Mack meets park ranger Paula Vertosick on his camping vacation and contemplates having an affair with her. Karen is amused at Abby's wedding announcement. Karen breaks the news to Paige, unaware that Paige thinks Greg wants to marry her. Olivia is disgusted to hear Abby is marrying Greg. Greg tells Paige he should never have gotten involved with her. Paige returns to work the next morning, insistent on keeping her job. Jill leaves Gary's ranch, but is giving her new landlord the run around about moving in. She lies that her apartment is not ready to get back onto the ranch. Greg announces both his candidacy for mayor and his engagement to Abby. First appearance of Paula Vertosick (recurring guest star Melinda Culea).
230	11	"Merger Made in Heaven"	Joe Coppoletta	Bernard Lechowick	January 19, 1989	22.8
Paige questions why Greg has not told Abby about their relationship. Greg tells her that his conversations with his fiancee are private. Harold proposes to Olivia. Olivia tells Abby she does not need her permission to live her life. Paige pleads with Greg that she will do anything to be with him. Mack is disillusioned that his office is assigned to defend the county against the homeless. Paige arranges to be with Ted at the same time and place Greg and Abby Harold has difficulty finding a job. Johnny and Harold rent an apartment together. Paige anonymously sends Greg and Abby a croquet set. Olivia realizes Abby set up Harold and threatens to derail Greg's campaign by exposing her if she does not allow Olivia's engagement to Harold. Harold's charges are dismissed. Greg and Abby are married. Gary tells Jill not to return to the ranch.
231	12	"Mrs. Peacock in the Library with the Lead Pipe"	John Pleshette	Lynn Marie Latham & James Stanley	January 26, 1989	23.3
Abby and Greg make love. Mack quits his job and begins looking for office space to go into private practice. He successfully negotiates a settlement for the homeless. His secretary Peggy later joins him in his private practice. David, the man Jill claims she slept with in San Francisco, tells her she gave him VD. Gary is amused when Jill tells him the news. He later finds out he does not have VD. A delusional Jill tells the doctor she and Gary are getting married, argues with a print shop about wedding invitations, and inquires about enrolling "her" twins in kindergarten. Gary learns Jill had a prescription for sleeping pills. Later, Mack informs him that Jill negotiated a plea for an elderly lady who was facing prison time for forgery. Johnny tells Paige he knows how it feels to be dumped by someone you love. Val's Aunt Virginia brings the twins home with plans to stay to look after Val. Jill learns Gary knows she had a prescription for sleeping pills. First appearance of Virginia Bullock (recurring guest star Betsy Palmer).
232	13	"Colonel Mustard in the Conservatory with the Wrench"	Lorraine Senna Ferrara	Bernard Lechowick	February 2, 1989	24.2
Mack and Peggy use an old key to get the file on Mrs. Bailey, the forgerer Jill used to write the Ben letters. Mack hires Frank to locate Mrs. Bailey, who is found in a hospital, unable to speak. Jill learns that Mack and Peggy took a file from her office. Gary is arrested for breaking into Jill's apartment, but she refuses to press charges. Jill lashes out at Gary for believing Val's story. Michael has a crush on a classmate named Ellen, but she has eyes for Johnny. A wedding dress arrives for a delusional Jill. Pat, Frank, Mack, and Karen plot out scenarios that support Val's story. Pat says that in small doses the sleeping pills Jill had could make someone forgetful. David, Jill's San Francisco alibi, tells Gary and Mack he does not remember the night he spent with Jill.
233	14	"Without a Clue"	Lawrence Kasha	James Stanley	February 9, 1989	20.0
Karen tells Val that Mack is working to get a court order to search Mrs. Bailey's apartment. Meanwhile, Jill breaks into the apartment, locates incriminating evidence, and burns it. Jill takes a lie detector test, which she passes. Gary asks Jill to see a psychiatrist. Harold and Olivia babysit Meg. Karen has some separation anxiety when she takes Meg to day care. Greg tells Ted that Mack and Karen have not legally adopted Meg, but she is better off with them. Ted tells Greg that he will lose the election if he has no better explanation for his choice than that. Michael and Ellen's computer program is deemed marketable by their professor. Ellen tells Johnny she is not interested in Michael. Jill shops for a wheelchair for her "fiancé." Greg tells Mack he wants Meg in his home, but Mack tells him that will happen over his dead body. Jill cuts the straps on a saddle in Gary's stable.
234	15	"The Spin Doctor"	Andre R. Guttfreund	Lynn Marie Latham	February 16, 1989	23.1
Abby suggests Greg let the lawyers handle all future contact with the MacKenzies. Mack tells Karen about Greg's request. Paige eavesdrops on the conversation. Later, she asks Greg why he would want a woman like Abby to raise his daughter. Jill shops for a hospital bed. Julie is injured while riding Gary's horse. Karen slaps Abby for saying that a dead Laura has no say in who should raise Meg. Gary threatens Jill. An antsy Gary sleeps outside of Val's house fearing Jill will hurt her or the twins. Olivia tells Abby she will not let her do to Meg what she has done to her. Mack and Karen hire a lawyer. Olivia takes Meg for a walk and does not return for hours. Pat learns the saddle Julie was riding on was cut deliberately. She then spies Jill on the ranch, but she disappears from sight. Ted and Abby leak a sob story about Greg and Meg to the press.
235	16	"Poor Jill"	Jerome Courtland	Bernard Lechowick	February 23, 1989	24.7
Gary is disturbed to learn Jill has been riding horses and hiking on Gary's ranch. He also suspects that Jill is turning his bed down, stealing pics of the twins, and leaving flowers in his bedroom (she has been). Gary threatens Jill to leave Knots Landing or he will destroy her. Jill notifies the police. Ted arranges a sit-down meeting between Mack, Karen, Greg, Abby, and their attorneys. Paige berates Ted for using Meg for political purposes. Jill has Gary served with a restraining order. Karen apologizes for hitting Abby; Mack says she did not hit her hard enough. The twins accidentally run into Jill at the library, and she convinces them not to tell Val they saw her. When Val learns about it, she violently confronts Jill at her office. Paige secretly takes Meg to see Greg. Mack and Karen decide to give up Meg to prevent a custody battle. Greg prepares a speech saying Meg will stay with the MacKenzies. Gary is pulled over by the police, who discover Jill's dead body in the trunk of his Jaguar.
236	17	"Double Jeopardy"	Kevin Dobson	Lynn Marie Latham	March 2, 1989	24.9
Pat admits to Karen that she has a crush on Gary. Frank tells Pat that Jill got what she deserved. Val goes for a jog after learning of Jill's death and collapses in a fit of tears and laughter. Police tell Mack a witness saw Gary put Jill's body in his trunk. Abby theorizes that Gary could have only killed Jill to protect Val or to cover up for her. Gary says Val is his alibi during the time Jill died. Greg's speech curries favor with the public. The coroner determines Jill died from asphyxiating on her own vomit. Material is found underneath Jill's fingernails; meanwhile, Gary's neck has three fresh scratch wounds on it. Greg tells Paige he plans to move out of L.A. after being elected mayor. On election day, a newspaper story leaks that Greg had planned to sue to get his daughter back. The reporter calls Paige and thanks her for the scoop. Greg loses the election. Ted and Abby form an alliance "to win." Gary recalls that when he last saw Jill she had been drinking. Mack thinks Gary killed her.
237	18	"A Grave Misunderstanding"	Timma Ramon	Chuck Bulot & M.J. Cody	March 9, 1989	24.8
Mack does not know how to craft a defense for Gary or if he wants to. Lawyers try to get Val and Gary to turn on each other. Gary and Val show up to Jill's funeral. Val throws dirt in Jill's grave. Mack learns the witness that saw Gary stuff Jill's body in his trunk is anonymous. Abby lobbies to keep Ted as Greg's PR guy. Mack learns Frank was at Jill's on the day she died. He admits to scaring her. Mack says he will notify the police if Frank does not. Frank later tells Pat he has no alibi for the afternoon Jill died and asks her to say he was with her. Ted asks Paige why she tanked Greg's election. Ted agrees to keep silent about Paige as they have mutual interests (he wants Abby and she wants Greg). Ted tells Abby, Greg, and Paige the leak came from a typist in the MacKenzies' lawyer's office. He privately asks Greg to promote Paige to work with him on a media campaign. While investigating, Mack and Harold unknowingly walk right by a Jaguar key hidden beneath Jill's apartment building.
238	19	"Guilty Until Proven Innocent"	Lawrence Kasha	James Stanley	March 16, 1989	24.4
The court finds probable cause that Gary killed Jill and denies him bail. Jill's landlord finds Gary's car key near the building. Frank and Mack determine Jill plans to marry Gary. Frank lashes out at Pat for not believing in him. Geologist and co-conspirator Rick Hawkins tells Abby she will need an environmental impact report before she can drill for oil at Lotus Point. Karen sees the twins perform a magic trick with rope and theorizes that Jill killed herself. Once Jill's print is found inside a hole in Gary's trunk, Mack recounts for the DA Jill's diabolical plan to frame Gary for her "murder." Without disclosing her connection to Murakame, Abby convinces Ted to handle the company's PR. Paige tells Greg he married Abby because he is afraid of Paige herself -- and he should be. The DA drops all charges against Gary. Final appearance of Jill Bennett (Teri Austin).
239	20	"Birds Do It, Bees Do It"	John Pleshette	Bernard Lechowick & Lynn Marie Latham	March 30, 1989	23.3
An Ann Landers column on sex after marriage has everyone talking. Karen later shows up at Mack's office wearing a teddy beneath her coat -- and is seen by Mack's clients. Michael, Ellen, and their college friends go on a spring break camping trip. Johnny shows up there, and Michael realizes he and Ellen are lovers. Olivia uses Michael's camping trip as a cover so she can spend a weekend with Harold, but he is insistent that they not be intimate. Pat and Frank make up, thanks to Julie. Paige and Greg have a talk about having sex. Abby and Karen are both nominated to serve on the board of an environmental protection group. Abby "accidentally" dumps a cup of coffee in Karen's lap. Karen later learns Murakame has applied for drilling permits at Lotus Point. Paige finagles her way into a rent-free apartment owned by the Sumner Group. At their board meeting, Abby and Karen present opposing responses to Murakame's plan to drill for oil. Abby reveals to Ted that she is Murakame. Michael meets and interacts with ranger Paula Vertosick, who says she will be lecturing at his college this semester.
240	21	"Giganticus II: The Revenge"	Joe Coppoletta	Lynn Marie Latham & James Stanley	April 6, 1989	22.7
Abby presents a report supporting Murakame's plan to drill for oil and offers the Sumner Group as both meeting space and corporate sponsor for the environmental rights board. Michael connects Paula and Karen in the hopes Paula can help Karen with a report opposing Murakame's plan to drill for oil. Ted recommends Greg as an appointee for U.S. trade representative to Japan. Paige suggests Greg develop a relationship with Murakame to help secure the appointment. Gary notices Val's new haircut. Abby arranges a meeting between Greg and a Murakame representative named "Mr. Nagata" (an actor she has hired). When Abby cuts Paige out of the lunch meeting, Paige moves an out of order sign to trap Abby in a malfunctioning elevator. "Nagata" says he will take Greg's offer of support to the Murakame board. Later, Greg is notified Murakame has declined his offer. Karen invites Paula to dinner, to Mack and Paula's surprise. Paula tells Mack she does not think she should work with Karen. Ellen shows Johnny how to work the computer security program she and Michael have designed. He later copies the program. Paige sees "Nagata" acting in a movie.
241	22	"Dial M for Modem"	Joseph Scanlan	Lawrence Kasha	April 13, 1989	22.2
Paula's presentation to the environmental rights board annoys Abby. Paige locates the actor Abby hired to portray "Nagata." Johnny applies for a copyright for Michael and Ellen's computer program. Paula and Karen photograph surveyors in a protected area on Lotus Point, despite Murakame's pledge not to drill in that area. Gary enjoys a call from "Sally's friend", who has dialed his number by mistake. Johnny pitches "his" computer security program to Sumner, who agrees to buy it. Michael unknowingly alerts Abby that Paula and Karen have found evidence to stop Murakame from drilling at Lotus Point. Abby later puts a virus in the college campus computer system and steals Paula's file. Karen tries to play matchmaker with Gary and Paula. Paige confronts Ted with "Nagata's" claim that Ted hired him. Ted threatens to tell Greg that Paige tanked his election if Paige says anything about "Nagata" to Greg. Paula's computer files are lost, along with her file containing her Lotus Point research and photos. Ginny tries to get Val to write again.
242	23	"That's What Friends Are For"	Lawrence Kasha	Stephen Tolkin	April 20, 1989	22.7
Abby shreds the contents of Paula's Lotus Point file. Ted accuses Abby of directing "Nagata" to give Paige his name. She then uses sex (in an elevator) to show him that she is still loyal to him. Greg is not interested when Paige tells him that "Nagata" is an actor. Ginny buys Val a computer to help her with her writing, and says a computer tech named Danny comes along with the purchase should any issues arise. Paige can no longer locate "Nagata" because Abby has paid him to leave the country. However, he shows up later and extorts Abby for even more money. Michael and Ellen are accused of plagiarism and placed on academic probation once Sumner Group's computer security program is revealed. Sumner tells them Johnny sold him the program. He tells Michael and Ellen to prove he stole it. Abby tries to get Paige to go work for Sumner Group in New York, but she declines the opportunity. Karen asks Abby for Murakame's number so she can contact the company directly. Mack accuses Paula of coming after him. Paula recommends Michael sue Sumner. Val enjoys meeting Danny. Abby asks Ted to deliver money to "Nagata." Ted learns Abby would be guilty of fraud and embezzlement if her former partners learned she is Murakame. Paige sees Ted and "Nagata" driving away together. Later, she learns that "Nagata" was killed in a car accident. First appearance of Danny Waleska (recurring guest star Sam Behrens).
243	24	"The Perfect Opportunity"	Michele Lee	James Stanley	April 27, 1989	21.8
Ted assures Abby that "Nagata's" death was accidental. Mack dreams and daydreams of kissing Paula. Paige threatens to tell the police she saw him with "Nagata" before his death, and he tells her she is in way over her head. Val and Danny go on a lunch date. Through an interpreter, Karen learns that Murakame is not a Japanese company. News reports indicate "Nagata's" death may not be accidental. Michael threatens to sue Sumner. He later tells Johnny he will only end up with about 2 percent of what the computer program is worth. Frank joins Mack's office as an investigator. Karen invites Paula to stay with the MacKenzies while her water heater is being repaired in her apartment. Paige accesses Ted's computer files and learns Ted works for Murakame. Abby doctors Paige's Sumner Group expense reports so that it looks like Paige is misappropriating funds. When the discrepancies are noticed, Abby is surprised to additionally learn that Paige is living in a Sumner Group property rent-free. Greg tells Abby to handle it, so she fires Paige. Final appearance of Johnny Rourke (Peter Reckell).
244	25	"Straight Down the Line"	William Devane	Lynn Marie Latham	May 4, 1989	21.3
Paige tells Ted she knows he works for Murakame. He claims Murakame required his confidentiality about his employment. Paige vows to get to the bottom of what is happening. Rick Hawkins gives Paige the run around when she asks what Ted does for Murakame. Rick Hawkins tells Abby that the Lotus Point drilling permits will be denied and she could be imprisoned for defrauding her partners in the sale of Lotus Point. Abby suggests he could be named as a co-conspirator if she is accused of fraud. She asks him to pre-date the documents so that it appears that someone else owned Murakame. Mack and Karen ask Abby to join them in suing Murakame, which will require them to release the name of the owner. When she declines, Karen says she does not need her anyway. Greg visits D.C. to secure his appointment as trade representative to Japan. While Greg is away, Abby and Ted play. Abby gets Ted to agree to put his name as Murakame's owner on the back dated documents. Gary and "Sally's friend" agree to meet at a market. He misses meeting her but does meet Danny, who's there with Val and the twins. Quarters in the MacKenzie house are a bit too close for Mack and Paula. Paige spies Abby and Ted in an intimate moment. Paige warns Rick that Abby will set him up. Rick mails Paige a letter at Sumner Group. Abby dumps the letter in the trash. Rick is electrocuted in his bathtub.
245	26	"The Heat of Passion"	Nicholas Sgarro	Joel Okmin	May 11, 1989	21.8
Karen accuses Abby and of being involved in Murakame and using Ted as a front. Paige threatens Ted that she will tell Greg about him and Abby. Greg asks Abby to fire Ted once he learns of his "duplicity" in owning Murakame. Ted and Abby agree that he will resign instead. Abby tips off that Greg has been imprudent about Ted's involvement in Murakame. Mort, a Sumner Group employee, picks Rick Hawkins' letter out of the trash and plans to use it to get closer to her. Paige suspects something has happened to Rick and shares her concern with Mack. Ted tells Abby he is not worried about Rick. Abby suspects he is killed Rick. Abby pulls away from Ted. Abby tries to set Olivia up with a young, attractive Sumner Group employee, but she announces at her 18th birthday party that she and Harold were married that morning. Ted tells Mack that Paige was fired because Greg set up his mistress in a Sumner Group apartment. Ted learns that the drilling permits were denied a week ago. Ted realizes Abby set him up. Mort delivers to Paige the letter, which contains a key and a note that she was right about Ted. Mack tells Paige he is ashamed of her. At Olivia's party, he punches Greg in the eye. The police discover Rick's body. A reporter contacts Karen with the allegation that Abby owns Murakame. Karen tells Abby she will go to jail for fraud. In a nod to the show's roots, Harold tells Abby he has gotten a job at Knots Landing Motors.
246	27	"Down Came the Rain and Washed the Spider Out – Parts 1 & 2"	Jerome Courtland	M.J. Cody & Chuck Bulot	May 18, 1989	25.0
247	28	"Down Came the Rain and Washed the Spider Out – Parts 1 & 2"	James Scanlan	Bernard Lechowick	May 18, 1989	25.0
Greg tells Abby their "business arrangement" (marriage) is over. Karen and Gary try to find evidence against Abby. The reporter tells Ted that she will need proof that Abby defrauded her partners before she can print the story. Greg allows Paige to keep her Sumner Group apartment but does not want Paige to know he is behind her staying. Rick's death is reported in the newspaper. Paige goes to the police with her suspicions that Ted is involved in Rick's death, but they find her story incredible. Harold and Olivia honeymoon in their apartment. Harold tells Paige she has a post office box key. Abby tells Paige she is a "6" on the Abby scale. When Abby suggests an annulment, Olivia tells her she wants to live on her own. Abby takes Olivia's credit cards and car. At her press conference, Abby claims she bought Murakame only recently to save it from oil drilling. She donates the Lotus Point land to the state as wildlife preserve. Abby is chosen as U.S. trade representative to Japan. While she is in Japan, Abby asks Karen to look after Olivia. Mack and Karen make plans to vacation in the mountains. Paige tries, unsuccessfully, to locate the post office box. Abby shows Ted photos of him tinkering under the hood of "Nagata's" car. She says Rick sent them to her, and as long as nothing happens to her, the police will never see them. She also notifies him that Rick sent Paige a note incriminating him. Karen volunteers Mack to drop Paula off on their way to their mountain vacation. Greg reveals that he stopped the drilling permits on Lotus Point. Abby and Brian leave Knots Landing. Ted claims Abby and Greg set him up and are trying to kill him. Ted stalks Paige incessantly, trying to convince her that she cannot trust Greg and should tell him what was in the letter Rick sent her. Both Paige and Ted try to get Mort to give them access to Rick Hawkins' files. Paige succeeds, but finds nothing in the files. Her apartment is ransacked when she returns home and the key is missing. Paige seeks refuge at Greg's ranch. Ted calls, claiming Greg was not out of town the night Rick died. Carlos confirms he was in California at the time. Greg says he was overseeing a takeover. Paige and Greg make love. Afterward, Paige finds a post office box key in Greg's personal effects. While getting gas on the road trip, Karen breaks her ankle, requiring her to spend a night in a hospital. Mack takes Paula to a motel some miles away but rain, a flat tire, and a skunk force him to spend the night in Paula's room. Paige runs away from Greg, saying she cannot trust him. Ted arrives. Paige is left standing in the rain, unsure whether to trust Greg or Ted. Final regular appearance of Abby Cunningham (Donna Mills), she returns in the show's finale.

=== Season 11 (1989–90) ===
No. overall	No. in season	Title	Directed by	Written by	Original release date	Viewers (millions)
248	1	"Up The Spout Again"	Jerome Courtland	Bernard Lechowick	September 28, 1989	22.8
Paige decides to leave the ranch with Ted, who insists that she tell him where Greg is storing the key at the ranch. When Greg calls and leaves a message proving that Paige took the key, Ted demands she give it to him. She throws him a key. Paige learns Rick Hawkins has a second home in Spring Lake and goes there, followed by both Greg and Ted. Greg hires muscle to get from Ted the key. Mack and Paula act awkwardly around Karen, who is discharged from the hospital. Karen notices Paula's odd behavior, but Mack pretends he does not notice. Val visits Danny at his place and they share a kiss, but Val leaves before things escalate. Gary is teased by Val and Pat about his mystery woman, but he admits to Pat that he is never met her. He later tells "Sally's friend" that he no longer wants to talk to her unless she gives him her number. When she does not, he hangs up. She receives a phone call from someone she insists not call her again. Later, she calls Gary back and agrees to meet him. She calls again just before they are set to meet and expresses some trepidation. She puts Gary on hold to answer her door. Gary listens as the man at her door argues with her and then attacks her. The phone line then goes dead. Tonya Crowe and Patrick Petersen are added to the opening credits, replacing departing cast members Teri Austin and Donna Mills.
249	2	"Poetic Justice"	Nicholas Sgarro	Bernard Lechowick	October 5, 1989	20.8
Gary tries, to no avail, to trace "Sally's friend" through phone records. Karen plans a barbecue for Eric and Linda, who will be arriving soon. She is curious about Val's relationship with Danny and tells Val to invite him to the barbecue. Paige steals Greg's keys and wallet, and later uses the key she has retained to locate Rick Hawkins' mail box. Before she does, Greg arrives and demands she give him the key. The police officer who has been friendly to Paige escorts Greg outside. Ted, meanwhile, has managed to escape from captivity. He notices Paige leaving and hotwires a car to pursue her. Paige has a flat and stops at a service station to get it changed. While in the restroom, she opens Hawkins' mail and learns that Abby owned Murakame. She also discovers film negatives. Ted busts through the bathroom door with a sledgehammer just as Paige escapes through a window with the documents. Threatening with the sledgehammer, Ted gets the documents from Paige. She later retrieves the negatives from a hiding place in the restroom. The truck Ted hotwired has a loose axel and is expected to break down. Paige and Greg come upon the truck being pulled from a lake, and assume Ted has perished. He actually escaped and hitches a ride away from the scene. The twins spy Val and Danny kissing and later tell her that they does not want Danny to come around anymore.
250	3	"Prince Charming"	Joseph Scanlan	Lynn Marie Latham	October 12, 1989	21.5
Val tells Danny "no", but she cannot deny to Karen later that she is considering his offer. Paige pays to get the film negatives developed. Greg offers to re-hire her, but she rebuffs his offer and his attempt to romance her. Karen is surprised to learn that Mack and Paula shared a hotel room. She later invites Paula to a barbecue for Eric and Linda. Ted has a proposition for Greg: he will not release the Murakame papers, proving Abby defrauded her Lotus Point partners (and possibly incriminate Greg in her dealings) if Greg will get him the negatives Rick Hawkins had in his box. Eric and Linda return. Olivia and Harold haggle over their budget. Paige sees the photos of Ted engineering Nagata's car crash, and later apologizes to Greg, telling him she took the evidence to the police. Danny is surprised to learn the twins' teacher is named Amanda, and he avoids meeting her. The twins do not want to attend the barbecue with Danny. Gary places a large ad in the newspaper looking for "Sally's friend." Paige attends the barbecue and fights with Mack again once he learns she has agreed to return to Sumner Group. Karen is surprised when Michael tells her that Paula is in love with a married man. Karen agrees to let Linda stay with the Mackenzies for about two months while Eric is in Saudi Arabia for a job. Karen asks Mack what happened in the hotel room. He admits that nothing happened but that he was attracted to Paula. Paige is shocked when she learns Greg stole the pictures and traded them to Ted for the Murakame papers. Ted leaves for Japan. Danny shows up to Amanda's and kisses her. Final appearance of Ted Melcher (Robert Desiderio).
251	4	"Close Call"	Lawrence Kasha	James Stanley	October 19, 1989	21.7
Danny drops off Amanda at school, where Val is dropping off the twins. He pretends that he came there to see Val. Gary hires Frank to help him find "Sally's friend." The twins tells Gary that they want to live with him because Val does not love them anymore. Paige requests Abby's old office, a $120,000 salary, an expense account, a company car, her own parking space, secretary, with six months guaranteed severance pay. Greg questions Paige about what people will think if he honors her requests, and she says she does not care what people think. Michael accepts $100,000 from Greg for his rights to the Super Lock program and quits college to work for Sumner, to Mack and Karen's disapproval. Gary and Val disagree about how to handle the twins' dislike of Danny. Val tells Danny that Gary is the twins' father. Karen asks Paula why she did not tell her that she was in love with Mack. Paula admits to her crush, but says she never acted on it because of her friendship with Karen. Gary goes with Pat to hear Frank play guitar and sing at a club. Amanda is also singing there. Gary spies Amanda and Danny there together, kissing. As she is leaving, Gary hears Amanda call her dog Chester and realizes she is "Sally's friend."
252	5	"Best Interests"	Jerome Courtland	Bernard Lechowick	October 26, 1989	21.4
Gary learns "Sally's friend" is actually Amanda Michaels, but he has trouble getting her actual number. He goes to Val's the next morning hoping to get Danny's contact information, but Danny is there. Danny admits Amanda is his wife when Gary says he saw the two leaving the club together and kissing. Val rebuffs Danny. Gary hits Val's door trying to punch Danny. Ginny takes the twins to see a friend, Jeri Maddux, who steals cash from the office while Ginny and the twins are using the restroom. Danny tells Val that Amanda was unstable and unpredictable and that they have been separated nine months. Val continues to reject Danny. Paige rebuffs Greg's attempts to wine and dine her. Ginny is arrested as an accomplice to theft. Ginny tells Mack, Karen, and Val that Jeri took $17,000 that was owed to her pension fund, which had been taken away when her company changed owners. Jeri refuses to give back the money even though it may mean she will go to prison. Okmin Industries, the new owners, insist to their lawyer that they do not want the case to go to trial and they do not want to answer any questions about the case. Mack tells Karen that he is glad Jeri will not give back the money. Later, Jeri ends up dead on the pavement outside her seventh-floor apartment building.
253	6	"When Push Comes to Shove"	Nicholas Sgarro	M.J. Cody & Chuck Bulot	November 2, 1989	20.6
Danny cries to Amanda that he loves her and does not want a divorce. Later he makes up with Val. Karen's friend asks her to sub for her on the TV show "Open Mike". Karen's surprised to find that Greg is the guest. Paula comes down to support Karen, and they make up. Paula and Greg argue and verbally spar, and decide to have lunch. Ginny was at Jeri's when she was killed. Mack and Frank does not think it was a suicide and find out Mark Baylor was in her building at the time. Mack thinks that Mark killed Jeri. The coroner says she died from a blow to her head before the fall. Ginny is arrested for the murder.
254	7	"Mixed Messages"	Joseph Scanlan	Lynn Marie Latham	November 9, 1989	19.0
Amanda rebuffs Danny after their one-night stand. Both Gary and Danny are annoyed at each other's presences in their exes lives. Gary invites Amanda for a weekend getaway to free themselves of Danny's presence. Paula rebuffs Greg's attempts to use her to make Paige jealous. Greg puts Paige in charge of a prestigious Sumner Group account. Paige rebuffs Tom Ryan initially, but after he shows up at the Sumner office party, she takes him home and has sex with him. Mack accuses Mark Baylor of killing Jeri Maddux, yet agrees to defend him later. Michael has no date for the Sumner office party until Linda agrees to go with him, pretending to be "Theresa." Ginny finds money hidden in Jeri's jewelry box. First appearance of Tom Ryan (recurring guest star Joseph Gian).
255	8	"The Good Guys"	Robert Scheerer	Bernard Lechowick	November 16, 1989	18.5
Mack invites Paige and Tom to dinner at the Mackenzies. Mack attempts to exonerate Mark Baylor with the discovery of Ginny's money, but Mark threatens to accuse Mack of manufacturing evidence. Mark fires Mack when he refuses to plead him out. Karen guest co-hosts Open Mike and loves it. Michael and Linda double date with Harold and Olivia, who are arguing over money problems. Frank convinces Mack to get other retirees who lost their pension to file a class-action lawsuit against Okmin Industries. Mack shares the info with Tom, who pays a visit to one of the retirees, claiming he is working on Mack's behalf. The retiree ends up with a broken arm. Tom is revealed to be working for Okmin and is ordered to stop seeing Paige.
256	9	"Perfect Couples"	Lawrence Kasha	James Stanley	November 30, 1989	18.4
Danny feigns delight when Amanda signs the divorce papers, but privately he cries. Later, he makes love to Val. When Danny learns that Amanda is planning to go away with Gary, he becomes unreasonable with his divorce settlement. He breaks her grandmother's dishes when he learns that she wants them, later claiming he gave them to Goodwill. Tom and Paige pine for each other after he breaks up with her. Michael is testy when Mort wants to date "Theresa." Mark Baylor is sentenced to three years prison, and he cautions Karen to get Mack to back off of Okmin. Danny kidnaps Amanda's dog and then assaults her when she attempts to get it back.
257	10	"Never Judge a Book by Its Cover"	Nick Havinga	Lynn Marie Latham	December 7, 1989	19.4
Danny tells Amanda that no one will believe that he raped her. Amanda avoids talking to Gary. Danny buys Val an engagement ring. Karen becomes a permanent host for Open Mike. When Danny learns Amanda quit her job, he attempts to apologize and returns her dog to her. Michael admits to having a crush on Linda. She kisses him, but he says that "this did not happen." Later, Linda tells the MacKenzies that she and Eric are divorcing. Paige and Tom make up. When Amanda backs out of a date with Gary, he says he is had it "with crazy women." Paige is assaulted by one of Okmin's henchmen. Gary recognizes Amanda's voice as a call-in rape victim on Karen's show.
258	11	"Twice Victim"	John Pleshette	Bernard Lechowick	December 14, 1989	19.2
Gary helps Amanda to report her rape to the police. Amanda admits that she last had consensual sex with Danny two weeks before the rape and that she willingly went to Danny's. Danny tells Val that Amanda is making outrageous claims just before Gary informs her that Danny raped Amanda. Val does not believe Gary and later assures Karen that she is confident Danny did not rape Amanda. The DA refuses to file any charges against Danny. When Danny leaves Amanda a voice mail threatening legal action for defamation, Gary lures Danny to the ranch and scares him.
259	12	"What a Swell Party This Is"	Nick Havinga	Dianne Messina	December 21, 1989	20.9
Paige plays hooky from work to spend time with Tom. She spots Greg playing hooky with Paula. Linda tells Michael she wants to get her own apartment now that she is divorcing Eric. Harold and Olivia argue about her spending money on Michael's birthday gift. Karen plans a birthday party for Michael's 21st. Eric returns and tells Linda he does not want a divorce. Linda tells Michael she loves him. Michael refuses to be with Linda. Paula tells Greg he will have to put in effort to have her. Linda tells Karen that she is in love with Michael.
260	13	"Oh Brother"	Kevin Dobson	Bernard Lechowick	January 4, 1990	20.0
Mack discovers that Pomerantz is dead. He finds the doctor who signed his death certificate works for Okmin and is Pomerantz's uncle. Mack presses the doctor, who finally admits that Pomerantz is alive and living in Canada. Val tells Amanda she will not get away with her false accusations. Using psychometry, Ginny has a "psychic" feeling that Danny did rape Amanda and agrees with Gary to never leave him alone with the twins. Eric tries to work things out with Linda, who says she no longer loves him. Mack and Karen confront Michael about his involvement with Linda. Eric overhears and punches Michael. Eric packs and leaves. Linda moves out to her apartment and Michael decides to move in with Harold.
261	14	"Road Trip"	Lorraine Senna Ferrara	James Stanley	January 11, 1990	19.5
Mike loans Harold a lot of money, which he loses gambling. Olivia tells Gary she needs money for tuition, but instead invests it. Mack finds out that Pomerantz is living in Canada as Neil Strauss. He asks Tom to accompany him to Canada. Tom pretends to call Paige, but really alerts Okmin. Okmin sends Joe to Canada to kill Mack, since Tom will not. Pomerantz tells Mack that he'll trade his books of illegal loans for his freedom. They go to the airport and exchange books. Joe is about to shoot Mack when the police arrest Joe and thank Tom for the tip. Tom calls Okmin and says Joe screwed up. He says Mack has the books and is going to the DA. Okmin tells Greg that his pension fund scam is going to be exposed.
262	15	"My Firstborn"	Lawrence Kasha	Lynn Marie Latham & James Stanley	January 18, 1990	19.0
Greg's daughter Mary Frances returns from a volunteer assignment abroad. She calls her father to meet up but asks to stay with Karen and Mack. Karen tells Mary what Greg was up to while Mary was gone, married to Laura, Laura's death, and so on. Mary realizes that Meg is her sister. Mary tells them to never tell Meg who her real father is so she will never have to feel ashamed. Mack starts talking to the DA about the illegal Okmin pension loans. Greg gets a lowdown on the sad state of the Okmin pension fund from Bob. Greg fires the head of Okmin. Harold borrows more money from Michael and loses it in a card game. Olivia gets cold feet and wants to cash out of the Tramco stock investment. Greg confessions his past to Paula. Greg is nervous about seeing his daughter again. Mack explains to Paige that Tom was with him and not with another woman. Mack tells Paige that family is family and that she is stuck with him. Somehow Paige did not know that Greg had another daughter, but Paula knew about Mary. Mary shows up at the ranch and Carlos encourages her to let him announce her arrival. Snooping around Greg's house Mary finds old family photos and remembers the way Greg treated her as a child. Mack realizes that the Sumner Group owns Okmin Industries. He goes to confront Greg blaming him for the issues with the pension. Their meeting is interrupted by Mary arrival at Greg's office. Later Paula tells Mary to give her dad a break that he is not such a bad guy. She also points out that although he abandoned Mary for 5 years she could have called him at any point. Mary goes to see Greg and reconciles. While waiting in Greg's office she is shot and killed by a sniper. Greg rushes in to find her slumped at his desk dead. Stacy Galina replaces Danielle Brisebois in the recurring role of Mary Frances Sumner.
263	16	"Out of Control"	Andre R. Guttfreund	Bernard Lechowick	January 25, 1990	20.1
The Sumner Group is in chaos. Tom and the police question everyone. Greg's first wife Jane comes for Mary Frances' funeral. Tom discovers Paige had a relationship with Greg, and is angry she did not tell him. Val and Danny move up their wedding date, and Gary implores her minister not to marry them. Danny tells Val that Gary attacked him with a bat. Val confronts Gary who tells her that when she gets married and the minister gets to the part about any objections, he is going to stand up and yell "Rapist, rapist, rapist!" Gary asks the William's to keep on eye on Danny so he will not hurt the twins. Gary asks Mack if he has any legal recourse, but Mack says no. Val and Danny elope with only Ginny and the twins at the service.
264	17	"My Bullet"	Anita W. Addison	Bernard Lechowick	February 1, 1990	19.0
Both Michael and a bookie pressure Harold for money. Harold asks Mack to loan him $13,000, but when Mack hears how much money Gary has already given him, he says no. Harold calls Tom and says he knows who he works for, but will keep it a secret if he helps him out financially. Greg gets drunk, and the ghosts of Mary Frances and Paul Galveston follow him around. Worried, Carlos calls Paige, but then Paula shows up. Jealous, Tom follows Paige to Greg's. Paige is angry, but Tom says he is never been in love before, and they make up. Carlos gives Greg floppy discs that Mary Frances had in Greg's computer. Police discover where the sniper shot from and due to garbage on the site, think he was there a long time, so Greg was not his target, Mary Frances was. Howard Duff briefly reprises his role as Galveston.
265	18	"The Ripple Effect"	Peter Ellis	M.J. Cody & Chuck Bulot	February 8, 1990	20.0
Greg discovers that Mary Frances had been part of a subversive group, and used his computer to look up shipments from Okmin Industries to Monbasa over the past two years. Val brings Danny to meet the neighbors. He charms them all except for Karen, who "knows" that Gary is right about him. Gary and Amanda sleep together and she moves to Phoenix to start her life over. Paige breaks up with Tom when he lies to her. Mack figures out that Tom is a "dirty" cop who works for Okmin. Willis tells Tom he has one last job for him. Harold empties Olivia's bank account to pay his bookie and goes to Florida. He leaves a note telling her to apologize to Michael and for her to have a nice life. Greg is shot.
266	19	"The Grim Reaper"	Lawrence Kasha	Lynn Marie Latham	February 15, 1990	20.1
Diane berates Karen for bringing Eric on the show. Karen demands to see her own fan mail when she learns the station reads and responds to mail sent to her. Eric and Michael make up. Tom tells Willis he quits, but Willis will not have it. Later, Willis turns up dead. Baylor helps Mack connect Sumner to Willis and the disposition of poison in third world countries. Gary refuses to leave the twins alone with Danny when Val is not home. Danny wants to adopt the twins. A man breaks into Greg's hospital room and injects poison into his IV, claiming responsibility for Mary Frances and Willis’ deaths before turning himself into police. Linda tells Michael and Eric that she is working for Sumner Group.
267	20	"Wrong for Each Other"	Kevin Dobson	Dianne Messina	February 22, 1990	20.8
Eric threatens Linda to stay away from Michael, but she immediately tries to cozy up to him at work. Doctors indicate that Greg's IV was poisoned and the effects of the drug will not be immediately known. Karen meets Jeff Cameron, the assistant producer for her show. Jeff butters up Karen while sleeping with Diane. Paula admits to Karen that she is in love with Greg. Anne Matheson returns. Val is not happy that Danny has initiated adoption of the twins. Gary pleads with Val for them to tell the twins that he is their father. Danny violently reacts when Val says that she will not allow him to adopt the twins. Tom admits to Paige his involvement with Willis, but he says that falling in love with her has changed him. Final appearance of Eric Fairgate (Steve Shaw). Shaw died in a car accident 9 months after this episode aired.
268	21	"Good News, Bad News"	Michael Peters	Bernard Lechowick	March 1, 1990	20.7
Diane tells Jeff she wants Karen fired from the show. Paige tells Mack that she believes Tom has changed. Michael is unhappy when he and Linda are assigned to work together on a project. Danny punishes the twins for making "too much noise", and Ginny tells Val that she made a mistake marrying him. Linda is successful in her project at Sumner Group. Val notices a picture in Danny's wallet that he claims is his sister, but she later sees the woman and Danny's engagement in an old newspaper clipping. She learns from the woman's father that Danny beat and raped her. Anne creates trouble for Paula with Greg. Danny violently attacks Val when she confronts him with what she knows. She stabs him.
269	22	"Devil on My Shoulder"	Michele Lee	Lynn Marie Latham & Dianne Messina	March 8, 1990	20.6
Pat saves Danny's life while a hysterical Val watches. Greg tells Paula that Anne is a lot of fun, and he does not need a mother. Anne hocks her jewelry for money. Val is comforted by Gary. To get ahead at Sumner Group, Linda tries to cozy up to Paige. Later, she assists Paige's top client with a personal matter and finagles her way into sharing an office with Michael. After Pat quits her job and says she wants to go back into medicine, Frank threatens to leave her and take Julie with him. Anne uses a connection to invite Paula on an out-of-town panel. At a hearing, Danny claims Val's attack was unprovoked, but he also says he wants his marriage to work. Later, he shows up at Val's.
270	23	"Home Sweet Home"	Lawrence Kasha	James Stanley	March 15, 1990	16.8
Harold calls Olivia to apologize, but she says she is having the marriage annulled. The police tell Val that they cannot remove Danny from the home without a court order. Olivia lies to Gary to get money, but later returns it. Karen gives a fan attention, much to Diane and Jeff's concern. Anne makes a play for Greg right in front of Paula. Paige is not happy that Anne is trying to date Greg. Anne suggests to Tom that Paige and Greg may have feelings for each other. Tom later proposes to Paige. Danny throws Val's possessions onto the lawn after she moves to Gary's ranch. Pat is unhappy not practicing medicine. Ignoring Frank's concerns for their family's safety, Pat gets a job at a hospital. Frank tells Pat that he will file for divorce and custody of Julie. Danny changes the locks, insisting he will have Val's house as community property. Olivia joins Harold in Miami. A stalker leaves Karen a creepy note. Final appearances of Olivia (Tonya Crowe) and Harold (Paul Carafotes), although Crowe would briefly reprises her role in the 1997 miniseries.
271	24	"Only Just Begun"	Lorraine Senna Ferrara	Bernard Lechowick	March 29, 1990	19.8
Dianne tells Jeff they can use the stalker to scare Karen out of Open Mike. Both Val and Danny are unhappy that the divorce process will take six weeks or longer. Danny tells Bobby that Gary is his father, and he runs off the ranch. Gary tells the twins he is their real father. Danny is fired from his consulting job. Paula tells Greg she has a job offer in Toronto; Greg tells her that has great news. Paige cannot commit to Tom's proposal, but she eventually accepts. Karen's stalker gets an autographed photo that he adds to a collection of other Karen memorabilia. A drunk driving Danny hits Pat in the cul-de-sac.
272	25	"The One to Blame"	Michele Lee	Dianne Messina	April 5, 1990	20.7
Julie lashes out at Val and later Frank, blaming them both for Pat's accident. She refuses to leave her mother's bedside. Karen's stalker, Wayne, ends up getting a job as a security guard for the station. When Frank learns Danny hit Pat in a rental car, he vandalizes Danny's car in the cul-de-sac. Frank visits Danny and threatens to hurt him if he ever gets bail, which does eventually happen. Diane questions Jeff's loyalty to her; he no longer wants to be intimate. Greg proposes to Paige once he learns she accepted Tom's proposal. Greg hires an investigator to follow Tom. Pat regains consciousness but later lapses into a coma.
273	26	"My Love Always"	Nicholas Sgarro	Lawrence Kasha	April 26, 1990	20.9
Karen receives a letter at home from her stalker requesting an on-air birthday wish, then gets a call at work when she does not honor the request. Greg tells Paige that Tom is a thief, but she says she has dated worst. Anne steals Paige's driver's license, adds her photo to it, and uses it to open a new bank account. An accident on-set spooks Karen. Linda sets out on a plan to seduce Michael. Tom and his partner are accused by IA of stealing money from a narcotics sting. Gary sees Danny hiding in the background of a video the twins made while on the ranch. Karen's stalker leaves her torn photo with the words "I hate you" on her dining room table.
274	27	"If I Die Before I Wake"	Joseph Scanlan	James Stanley	May 3, 1990	18.7
Karen is on edge with fear at the station. Danny serves Val and Gary with restraining orders. Anne secretly knows that Paige is set to inherit a trust fund from her grandfather upon her marriage. Diane secretly leaks news of Karen's stalking to the press. Gary purposely stalks Danny to annoy him. Karen says she will leave Open Mike after the press and the stalker's phone calls become too much. Karen receives flowers with live snakes in the box. The doctor informs Frank that Pat is brain dead. Tom is suspended from the police department and learns $100,000 was deposited in his bank account. Mack sees Wayne's shrine to Karen.
275	28	"The Fan Club"	Nicholas Sgarro	Lynn Marie Latham	May 10, 1990	20.2
Jeff and Diane take down Wayne, who expresses shame to Karen for what people will think of him. Frank refuses to take Pat off life support until he can find a way to tell Julie that Pat is dead. Karen warns Linda to stay away from Michael. Wayne denies writing the letters and without proof, the police cannot hold him. Linda claims to Michael that Eric abused her. Frank punches Danny when he blurts out in front of Julie that Frank will be responsible for Pat's death if he ends life support. Karen's unseen stalker (not Wayne) puts a beef heart in a gift box with a menacing note for Karen. Julie threatens Danny with a rifle.
276	29	"Let's Get Married"	Jerome Courtland	Bernard Lechowick	May 17, 1990	20.0
Frank disarms Julie. The threatening letter to Karen now gives police evidence to prosecute her stalker. Pat dies after life support is removed. Wayne accuses Diane of being Karen's stalker. Anne forges a blank marriage license so that she can have Paige's trust fund wired into the account she opened. Police find evidence in Diane's home that links her to stalking Karen. Val and Gary work together to get Danny re-arrested. Diane ends up in a psychiatric ward after she is found to have LSD in her system. Greg is the mastermind behind Tom's set up and gives Tom a way out of his trouble. Tom leaves the church before the wedding. Michael arrives to the wedding with Linda. Karen disowns him telling him he is no longer part of her family unless he breaks up with Linda. Michael tells Karen he wants to marry Linda. Jeff is revealed as the stalker and is promoted to producer of the show after Diane's "psychotic break." He has a scrapbook of dead TV personalities with a blank page earmarked for Karen. Gary asks Val to marry him noting it would be a shame to let the church, minister and flowers go to waste. Greg finds a distraught Paige and asks her if she wants to "get outta here". Final appearance of Patricia Williams (Lynne Moody).

=== Season 12 (1990–91) ===
No. overall	No. in season	Title	Directed by	Written by	Original release date	Viewers (millions)
277	1	"Return Engagement"	Lorraine Senna Ferrara	Bernard Lechowick	September 13, 1990	21.2
Danny comes back to the cul-de-sac "born again" with religion now that he has been released from jail. His crime deemed an accident. He arrives at Val's preaching forgiveness. Val, Gary and the neighbors encourage him to stay away. Val agrees to marry Gary. Greg is told by his doctor that his liver is failing. News of his death is in the newspaper. Anne and Paige rush to his side, but he denies his death is any more imminent than anyone else's. Greg's sister, Claudia, arrives with her daughter, who looks a lot like Greg's daughter Mary Frances. Greg suspects her motives. Jeff gives Karen 2 car phones, for her safety. Jeff is planning to kill Karen, setting up a bomb in his apartment that is triggered by a phone call. In the final scenes, Mack and Meg are trying to find Karen and call Jeff's apartment using the car phone. A bomb explodes inside Jeff's apartment. Michelle Phillips and Larry Riley are added to the opening credits, replacing departing cast member Tonya Crowe. First appearances of Claudia and Kate Whittaker (recurring guest stars Kathleen Noone and Stacy Galina, who previously played Mary Frances).
278	2	"Blind Side"	Nicholas Sgarro	Lynn Marie Latham	September 20, 1990	22.1
Jeff apparently was killed by the bomb blast at his apartment. Gary and Val start looking at property in Texas. Paige goes back to work and receives a lot of unwanted attention regarding her canceled wedding. With the vultures circling, Greg proposed an exotic trip with Paige. Anne continues returning Paige's wedding gifts for cash. Claudia visits Mack and Karen fishing for information on Greg's health. Claudia meets Meg and realizes that Meg is Greg's daughter. Karen decides to reconcile with Michael. Claudia continues snooping around to find out how long Greg has to live. Tom returns with a gun and threatens Greg. Tom read about Greg's health in the paper and is anxious to have Greg clear him. Greg sends Carlos on an errand to get the papers clearing Tom. Paige is packing her bag for the cruise. Karen tries to apologize but Michael will not listen. Julie gives away all of Pat's things to charity. Frank goes to a charity shop looking for a "dresser" set that belonged to Pat. Tom catches up with Paige at the dock and tells her that Greg set him up. She rebuffs him but then confronts Greg regarding Tom's claim. Paige walks away from Greg. Anne visits Tom. Claudia sabotages Kate's chance at a tennis scholarship. Danny sets all of Gary's horses free and then traps Gary in the barn.
279	3	"God Will"	Jerome Courtland	Bernard Lechowick	September 27, 1990	20.1
Danny attacks Gary in the barn breaking Gary's arm with a bat. He then abducts Gary, drives him to a remote location, forces him to drink alcohol, sabotages the car's brakes and then puts him into the car. Gary ends up running off the road. Danny heads back to the apartment of his new girlfriend. Val met with his girlfriend and warned her about Danny. Later, Danny and the girlfriend fight and she kicks him out. Meanwhile, Val is frantically looking for Gary. Mack and Val go looking for Gary while Frank and Julie watch the twins. Meanwhile, Tom is still trying to get Paige back but she is reluctant. Anne is still scheming on how to get her hands on Paige's inheritance. Claudia is busy scheming on her own trying to figure out how to get her hands on Greg's fortune if he dies. She and Anne have lunch and try to figure out why the other is in town. Claudia has Anne investigated and learns that she is broke. Anne makes a pass at Greg, he passes. Tom goes to the ranch asks Greg to leave Paige alone--after all, Greg is dying and Paige has her whole life ahead of her. Both Paige and Tom misread what is happening at Greg's and leave. Greg considers Tom's request. In the closing scene, Mack and Val come upon Gary's wrecked car. Mack picks up the empty alcohol bottle realizing what this means. Danny's body is floating in a pool. Karen is locked in the studio and sees Jeff alive.
280	4	"Dead But Not Buried"	Nicholas Sgarro	Dianne Messina	October 18, 1990	17.7
Jeff terrorizes Karen on the set. Diane calls the police and rescues Karen. Tired of her duplicity, Paige kicks her mother out. Claudia drops by to inform Greg that Anne is broke and that she took a teaching position and is moving to Knots Landing. Val is still looking for Gary with Frank and Mack's help. Danny's body is found and the prior days events are recalled to the police by the neighbors. Anne tries to tempt Greg but he is more interested in what she did with all her money. Paige reconciles with Tom. Gary is safe. He has a broken arm but is otherwise fine. Greg needs a liver transplant. Anne files for bankruptcy. Val learns that Danny drowned under suspicious circumstances, all of his fingers were broken. Anne receives an envelope containing pictures along with a demand for one million dollars, or the pictures will be published. Karen's now infamous Polyanna speech takes place in this episode.
281	5	"What If?"	Jerome Courtland	Parke Perine	October 25, 1990	20.2
Anne is being blackmailed. Paige wants to quit her job. Investigators speculate on what happened to Danny. Everyone at the office finds out Paige is looking for a job. Greg has Mort sabotage her effort to find another job. Karen is depressed. Mack sends Michael over to cheer her up. Greg spends time with Kate. Linda schemes at work, taking advantage of Paige's absence. Anne is blackmailing her European lover. Paige goes back to work and Greg offers her a promotion. Nick arrives to help Anne with the blackmail.
282	6	"You Can Call Me Nick"	Nicholas Sgarro	Lynn Marie Latham	November 1, 1990	19.2
Nick suspects Anne of the blackmailing, and says that he is going to stay with her and go wherever she goes. Anne's upset that Marco only sent $20,000 for the blackmailer. Paige is angry that everyone at the office thinks she got the promotion for sleeping with Greg. She asks Greg why he treats her like dirt. He asks Paige to marry him, but she walks out. Greg is really starting to get sick. Karen goes back to work. Diane says Karen is an egomaniac, and that she got a new job and cannot wait to leave. Police find a button by the pool where Danny was killed. Ginny decides to leave. Gary tells Val that his dreams have all come true and that he cannot wait to marry her. They go on a family picnic, and the twins run to Gary yelling that something has happened to Val. Final appearance of Virginia Bullock (Betsy Palmer).Final appearance of Dianne Kirkwood (Robin Strasser)
283	7	"Do Not Attempt to Remove"	Joseph Scanlan	Bernard Lechowick	November 8, 1990	19.9
After a fall from a horse and hitting her head, Val begins to act strangely. Tom does not like Paige working with Greg, and sucker punches Greg in the elevator after visiting Paige at the office. Anne continues scamming people to try to get money, lying to Nick about having to meet the blackmailers. Tom and Paige break up, Greg then offers her an apartment located next to his office. Val falsely believes the twins are playing with matches, then tells Gary she cannot trust them anymore after they deny it. Karen MacKenzie (Michele Lee) appears in only one scene, and has no dialogue.
284	8	"The Best Laid Plans"	Michele Lee	James Stanley	November 15, 1990	21.1
Val continues to behave strangely. Julie was home the day that Danny was killed. She explains that a drunken Danny attacked her by the pool, and she ran home. As Danny approached, she slammed the door on him, breaking his fingers. He then stumbled into the pool where he drowned. The police decided against pressing charges. Claudia moves into the cul de sac. Val calls off the wedding. Linda announces to Karen that she and Michael are getting married. Anne has a briefcase with money in it, but Nick replaces that briefcase with one containing a bomb. Paige finds Greg collapsed on the floor. Final appearance of Danny Waleska (Sam Behrens).
285	9	"Side by Side"	Lorraine Senna Ferrara	Bernard Lechowick	November 29, 1990	20.3
Gary tells Karen he is backing off from Val, the "queen of her own drama". Greg collapses and Paige waits with him at the hospital. Claudia tells the doctor that Greg only wants family to visit, and lies to Greg that Paige and Carlos are not there. Claudia's mad when she finds out that Greg is leaving the ranch to Carlos and everything else to Meg. Julie's friend Jason mouths off to Frank. Nick finds the $20,000 Anne stole, and admits there is a bomb in the briefcase he gave her. Anne has hidden it at Paige's office, but Linda has taken it. Linda seduces Harvey to get him some of Paige's reports, and then accuses him of leading her on. Finding out the briefcase is Anne's, she puts it back, and tells Paige. Anne has called a bomb threat into Sumner group. Paige takes the briefcase home. Anne and Nick decide to split the million, but does not know which briefcase has the money and which has the bomb.
286	10	"The Lady or the Tiger"	Nicholas Sgarro	Lynn Marie Latham	December 6, 1990	19.1
Jason's father beats him. Anne and Nick take the suitcases to a luggage store and call in a bomb threat. Tom, one of the investigators, notices the suitcase is Anne's. He takes it, and with the money buys a one way ticket to Brussels. Anne and Nick go to Tom's apartment, but discover he is gone. Linda sucks up to Alex, who works for Calloway. Alex tells Calloway that Sumner Group is ripe for a takeover. Val tells Karen that Gary is messy and smells like a barn. The maid tells Gary that Val left and said she will be back when "hell freezes over." Kate tells the hospital that Paige is her cousin so she can see Greg. Greg is very happy to see her. Claudia finds out that a liver is going to another patient. Since she is not yet in Greg's will, Claudia tells them if Greg lives, he will donate money for a new wing, so they decide to give the liver to Greg.
287	11	"Asked to Rise"	Kevin Dobson	Bernard Lechowick	December 13, 1990	19.0
Because Julie skipped, Frank goes to school with her and sits in on her classes. she is mortified but they make up. Jason tells Mack that his father died and he lives in a foster home. Mack talks to the school who says it is not true. Mack goes to his house and hears his father beating him. Claudia tries to keep Paige from seeing Greg, and meanwhile makes a new will for Greg with her as executor. Greg has his operation and asks Paige to marry him. She accepts, but also begins a secret affair with Kate. Nick and Anne get married, using Paige's name. Alex asks Linda for confidential figures, so she has him sign a contract that he will hire her if she is fired. Gary and Karen are concerned about Val's behavior. A doctor tells them she could be having brain seizures due to her fall. Val gets her hair cut, leaving the twins home alone. They climb up onto the roof to play.
288	12	"A Merry Little Christmas"	William Devane	James Stanley	December 20, 1990	19.6
Gary rescues the twins. Valene calls on her way to visit Lilimae, asking Gary to watch the twins and saying that Julie was supposed to be babysitting. Julie tells Karen that Val never told her to babysit. Claudia finds out that Anne married Nick for Paige's money, and uses this to blackmail them into signing Greg's fake will. Anne finds out there is no money left in Paige's trust. Nick has to go to Rome but tells Anne he'll be back. Linda tells Greg that Paige's Calloway report was inaccurate, so she made another one. Greg calls a meeting at his hospital room and berates Paige. Furious, she walks out. Alex tells Linda that Greg has cut his company off and is firing their management. Gary tells Karen that Lilimae has also tried to get Valene to see a doctor, without success. Michael wants to get married on New Year's eve, but Linda wants to wait. Carlos brings Paige her Christmas gift from Greg: a diamond bracelet. Mack calls the police about Jason, and he is taken away. Mack later finds Jason standing in front of his house, and Mack tells Jason he does not have to go in. “Have Yourself A Merry Little Christmas” Performed by Michele Lee.
289	13	"The Unknown"	Nicholas Sgarro	Dianne Messina	January 3, 1991	21.4
Paige dreams she meets herself as an older woman, and is miserable because she married Greg. Greg moves his sickbed to the office. He tells Paige he had a vasectomy and wants her to sign a prenuptial agreement, so she calls off the wedding. Mack discovers Jason was sent home because he refused to testify against his dad. Mack and Frank go to a poetry reading at Julie's school. Jason is there and sad his father did not show up, but he is glad to see Mack. Later Jason shows up at the MacKenzies. Anne decides to set her sights on Gary. Val returns and goes to see the doctor, but thinks Gary paid him to say she has temporary brain damage in a plot to get the twins. She replaces her pills with aspirin and moves to the ranch since Gary will not let her take the twins. She gets in bed with Gary and starts to kiss him. He does not think it is a good idea and she goes off on him.
290	14	"Simmer"	John Pleshette	Bernard Lechowick	January 10, 1991	20.6
Mack lets Jason spend the night, but says that does not have a solution. Dick Lochner tells Mack that Jason's lying, and Mack goes off on him. The next night Jason sleeps in the park. Julie's teacher Charlotte Anderson calls Frank to go to an art exhibit. Not sure if it is a date, he brings a reluctant Peggy, spurring Charlotte to ask him out for a real date. Linda is snide to Paige. In a meeting, Linda gives a suggestion that Greg really likes. Paige is fed up with her and complains about Linda to Greg. Karen offers to "babysit" Val. Gary goes to the gym, and is happy to "run into" Anne. Karen pays for a pizza with Val's money, and finds her pills at the bottom of her purse. Karen shows them to Gary.
291	15	"A Sense of Urgency"	Lorraine Senna Ferrara	Dianne Messina & James Stanley	January 31, 1991	18.6
Steve Brewer, a photographer, introduces himself to Kate and pretends to interview her. Linda gives Paige a report for Mrs. Richfield. Paige throws it away and has her take Mrs. Richfield's niece shopping. Linda gives a copy of her report to the niece, and Mrs. Richfield tells Greg she liked Linda's report better. Julie asks Frank to go out to dinner, so he cancels his date with Charlotte. At the restaurant Julie tells Frank she knows Charlotte goes there every Friday, so she took him there to get them together. After Val cooks the twins' hermit crabs for dinner, she agrees to go to the hospital for tests. Jason calls Mack for help. He is/H has been beaten up and claims it happened when he hitchhiked. He asks Mack to take him home. Mack tells Jason that his father abused him too, and that he shouldn't have to live like that. Jason tells Mack to take him somewhere else.
292	16	"Always on Your Side"	Jerome Courtland	Lynn Marie Latham	February 7, 1991	17.3
Mack and Karen go to court and ask to be Jason's foster parents, but the judge decides he should stay with his dad. Mack speeds off with Jason. He hides him in Val's house, but refuses to tell anyone where he is, so he is arrested. Frank and Charlotte go on a date. The doctor tells Gary that Val is not responding to medication, but might get better on her own. Mrs. Richfield's niece Susie is hired at Sumner Group and does a terrible job. Susie puts through an account Linda was secretly trying to get to Paige, who then takes over the account. Steve asks Kate a lot of questions about her father and Claudia. He accidentally dings Paige's car, and Paige is furious with him and demands he fix it. Steve has a parole officer who says he needs to get a job and stay out of trouble, or he will put him back in prison.
293	17	"In the Dog House"	Joseph Scanlan	James Stanley & Dianne Messina	February 14, 1991	16.6
Claudia tells Paige about Anne's fake marriage to get her trust fund. Anne goes to the ranch to get a puppy, as well as hoping she might be able to snag Gary, but is bored when Gary goes on and on about Val. Paige kicks Anne out. Nick finds Anne. He calls her Betty, and tells her to call him Dimitri. Steve tells Claudia he is her son and wants to know why she gave him away. She throws him out. Mack is jailed for hiding Jason, so Gary agrees to help. Val comes home as Gary is there to get Jason, and thinks Gary is hiding a woman there. Val questions the twins, who tell her about Anne. Jason's uncles go to the MacKenzies where Paige is babysitting. They demand to know where Jason is. One uncle punches Paige, so Jason runs out of Val's to help her. His uncles force Jason into their truck and speed off.
294	18	"Call Me Dimitri"	Nicholas Sgarro	Lynn Marie Latham	February 21, 1991	19.1
Mack is out of jail, and Jason's returned to his father, who promises to be nice but continues to be as abusive as ever. Jason leaves and his dad follows. Nick tells Anne he was traveling with a rich woman named Betty, and she was supposed to pick something up from her relatives. Anne pretends to be Betty, and the relatives give her a doll. Kate learns Steve is her brother. Linda blows off Michael to flirt with Greg. Val overhears Gary trying to have her committed, and leaves.
295	19	"Bad Dog"	Joseph Scanlan	James Stanley & Dianne Messina	February 28, 1991	19.4
Jason is unconscious in the hospital, and his dad is put in jail. Mack stays with him. Linda sleeps with Greg and breaks off her engagement to Michael. Claudia refuses to tell Steve or Kate who Steve's father is. Anne and Nick try to find out if the doll is worth something or if something's hidden in it. The dog rips the doll apart. Val comes by and yells at Anne to stay away from Gary. Seeing the dog, she takes it. Then a man breaks in and demands a vial that was hidden in the doll. Paige comes in with security to kick Anne and Nick out, and the man is arrested. Anne and Nick determine that the dog ate the vial, so they break into Gary's barn, but all the puppies look alike.
296	20	"Gone Microfiching"	Kevin Dobson	Mimi Kennedy	March 7, 1991	19.3
Val decides to go back to the hospital for further testing. Anne and Nick finally locate the capsule, and it has a microfiche map in it. Two different parties want it, so they make a copy and sell it to both, for a total of $550,000. They rent Tom's apartment. Charlotte tells Frank she does not want a serious relationship with him, so he goes on a series of disastrous dates. Claudia makes up a story about who Steve's father is, but he does not buy it. Linda jumps the gun on a project of Paige's, and Greg reams her out but she decides to still sleep with him. Mack finds out he will be disbarred for hiding Jason. Jason moves into the MacKenzies, and tries to be really perfect and helpful. Mack tells him to just relax and be himself.
297	21	"Upwardly Mobile"	Neal Ahern	Lynn Marie Latham & Dianne Messina	March 28, 1991	16.9
Jason is to have a goodbye dinner with his dad, but his father does not show up. Finding out their money is counterfeit, Anne and Nick decide to get real jobs, but both are inept and are fired on their first day. Anne decides to blackmail Claudia because she knows who Steve's father is. Kate is shocked to learn Steve was in prison. Kate asks Greg to hire Steve. Mort assigns Steve to be Paige's assistant. she is furious, and has hated him ever since he dinged her car. Greg and Steve meet and immediately argue, but Greg likes him. Paige and Steve get stuck in an elevator for several hours and they argue. When they are finally freed, Paige goes into Greg's office, only to find him with Linda.
298	22	"An American Hero"	Joseph Scanlan	James Stanley & Dianne Messina	April 4, 1991	18.0
Doctors discover that Val has a rare virus that is causing her strange behavior, but it is curable. Greg offers Claudia a job as head of his foundation. Mrs. Richfield wants Linda to work on her account with Paige. Paige places a sexy ad on a phone date line and gives Linda's phone number. Steve tells Kate his parents were forced out of their logging business by a big logging company, and his father was killed, and his mother died six months later. He said he got drunk and beat up the company representative, and that has why he was in jail. Steve finds out Greg owns the logging company. Jason's paper on an American hero has won a regional contest, and the final prize is a year abroad in Sweden. Jason does not want to read the paper, because it is about his father. At the ceremony, Jason changes his essay to be about Mack. Steve Shaw, who was killed in an automobile accident several months earlier, is remembered at the end of this episode with Michele Lee singing "Look at that Face", accompanied by scenes of Steve portraying Eric Fairgate throughout the years.
299	23	"Where There is a Will, There is a Way"	Michele Lee	James Stanley & Dianne Messina	April 11, 1991	19.6
Linda's mother Doris is in town, so Linda misses her meeting with Mrs. Richfield to meet her at the airport. Doris is really bitchy to Linda, and decides to fly home rather than stay with her. Greg takes both Paige and Linda off the Richfield account. Paige and Linda continue to argue and insult one another. Val is cured, and Gary suggests they get remarried. Karen throws a barbecue, and while playing with the twin, Gary bumps into Kate, breaking her arm. Claudia appoints Anne to the board of the Foundation, so Greg knows Anne has something on her. Anne tries to get a copy of Paul Galveston's will and tells Nick that Steve is worth a fortune because he is Galveston's son and Greg's brother.
300	24	"The Last One Out"	Nicholas Sgarro	Bernard Lechowick	April 25, 1991	18.1
Anne proposes a charity for Claudia's group to fund - but it is really to fund her and Nick. Claudia knows, and tries to delay. Michael decides to quit Sumner Group. There is a fire in the Sumner Building, and all the exits are sealed off. Most of the people for Val and Gary's rehearsal dinner are stuck there until it is evacuated. Greg and Linda use the time "constructively", and he invites her to move in with him at the ranch. Steve apologizes to Paige and kisses her. Babysitting all the kids, Julie and Jason kiss. Waiting outside of the Sumner Building, Val and Gary decide their rehearsal dinners are jinxed. They have a very tender moment, and Gary even cries. They decide to marry that night. They go to a judge and giggle throughout the ceremony.
301	25	"A Horse is a Horse"	Anita W. Addison	Scott Hamner	May 2, 1991	18.2
Paige tells Steve their kiss meant nothing. Greg assigns Paige to be head of Sumner Plaza and introduces her to Brian, the architect. He asks Paige to dinner and they kiss. Brian and Linda already know one another and sleep together. Linda moves to the ranch, where Greg tries to get her to play croquet. Gary, feeling bad that he broke Kate's arm, offers her a job at the ranch. Claudia's upset as she wanted Kate to work at the Sumner Group. Frank passes the bar and starts a new job at a fancy legal firm. He is mad when he finds Jason kissing Julie's feet. Anne and Nick steal a valuable piece of art from the Sumner collection. Anne wakes up to find that Nick has left her and taken the statue with him. Anne demands Claudia give her money or she will tell all. Claudia calls Greg and Steve into her office and tells them that Galveston is Steve's father.
302	26	"Play, Pause, Search – Parts 1 & 2"	William Devane	James Stanley & Dianne Messina	May 9, 1991	20.1
303	27	"Play, Pause, Search – Parts 1 & 2"	Lorraine Senna Ferrara	James Stanley & Dianne Messina	May 9, 1991	20.1
Greg tells Steve that he is not entitled to Galveston's money, but gives him $250,000 and says he can either save his logging town or go to the Bahamas. Kate finds out that Claudia lied about her scholarship, and decides to move in with Steve. Julie and Jason go to a party, where a gang stabs their friend Paul. Frank forbids Julie from dating Jason anymore. Brian comes on to Paige and she sees he has a video camera running. She punches him and leaves. Brian then goes to Linda, who agrees as long as she can keep the tape. The next day Brian is missing and so is Linda's tape. Michael buys a van and tells Karen he is leaving to travel the country. Anne's landlord kicks her out. She leaves several messages for Paige that she is desperate, but Paige ignores them. Anne stays overnight at a coffee shop drinking coffee. Anne sleeps overnight on a park bench, and her purse and suitcase are stolen. Everyone she goes to for help is too busy to see her. Steve decides to go back to his logging town, and Kate decides to help him move. Claudia goes to Steve's and hides her gun in his van. Claudia calls the police saying Steve is agitated and stole her gun. The police stop Steve's van and find the gun. Steve tells Kate that having the gun violates his parole. Steve pushes a policeman, and another officer shoots him. Linda cannot find her tape, but finds the one of Paige, and puts it in Brian's car. The police question Paige as she was the last one to be seen with him. The officer calls his partner - and it is Tom Ryan. Frank decides to go back to work for Mack. The gang wants Jason to join them, but Mack and Frank beat them up and they are arrested. Karen is shot with a paint pellet by a group of teens, and chases them in her car. The teen's car is hit by a truck. The kids are all unconscious and bloody. Jason is in the back seat. Final appearance of Michael Fairgate (Patrick Petersen), although he briefly reprises his role in the 1997 miniseries.

=== Season 13 (1991–92) ===
No. overall	No. in season	Title	Directed by	Written by	Original release date	Prod. code	Viewers (millions)
304	1	"The Gun Also Rises"	Lorraine Senna Ferrara	John Romano	September 12, 1991	446801	18.0
Kate blames Claudia for setting Steve up. Anne runs into Benny Appleman, who owes her money. He lets her stay with him, and they try to think up some scams. Linda secretly meets with Brian Johnston. Gary meets Joseph Barringer, a professor who is experimenting with how to capture ocean waves to make energy. Gary is excited by the idea, and wants to back him. While in Toronto for business, Paige meets Pierce Lawton, and is smitten. She waits by the phone for him to call, but he shows up at her apartment. Jason, in the hospital, tells Karen the other teens were the gang members who stabbed their friend. Karen tells one of the boy's mothers off, and then he dies. People make Karen into a hero for standing up to gang violence. Stacy Galina and Kathleen Noone are added to the opening credits, replacing department cast member Patrick Peterson.
305	2	"The Question Game"	Nicholas Sgarro	James Stanley	September 19, 1991	446802	16.7
Brian tells Linda that his wife sent a detective after him and he killed the detective. He needs Linda to pose as his wife to get gold coins out of his gym locker. She does and he gives her the tape. Then Linda goes to his wife and tells her she knows where Brian is. Anne decides to pose nude for a fashion magazine. Gary and Joseph go to Greg to back their new company. Greg does not want to work with Gary again, but Paige is interested. Kate moves to a new apartment and will not talk to Claudia. The D.A. wants Karen to plead guilty for reckless endangerment, but Mack advises her not to do it. Val meets a waitress, Lynette, from Mule Shoe, Texas where Lillimae grew up. Paige and Pierce spend romantic time together and he tells her he loves her.
306	3	"Eye of the Beholder"	Jerome Courtland	James Magnuson	September 26, 1991	446803	17.5
Pierce is interested in Tidal Energy, and meets with Gary and Joseph. Greg finds out Paige showed Gary's proposal to Pierce, and fires her. She decides to work at Tidal Energy too. Greg meets with Joseph about funding him, but he says he will not sell Gary out. Joseph asks Kate to lunch. Paige is embarrassed by Anne's nude layout. Val tells Lynette she will teach her to read. On "Open Mike", Karen's viewers laud her as a vigilante hero. Upset, she says she is not a hero - she met violence with violence, and someone died. Linda tells Brian's wife where he is for $50,000. Brian follows her and surprises her at her condo. He is furious and tells Linda she spoiled everything. He stabs her and cuts her throat.
307	4	"I, Claudia"	Nicholas Sgarro	Donald Marcus	October 3, 1991	446804	16.5
Karen's station insists she have Anne on as a guest. Anne admits on the show to being homeless. Karen tells Val she has lost interest in the show. Karen's producer Debbie asks Frank out, but he feels really old compared to her. Police tell Greg of Linda's murder. Val tries to teach Lynette to read, and they both become frustrated. Paige organizes the Tidal Energy office. They all go out for dinner, and are told that Greg has picked up the check. Kate tells Claudia off, and Claudia's really upset. Karen comforts her and invites her to dinner. When Claudia does not show, she and Mack go to Claudia's and find her passed out on the floor with an empty bottle of pills beside her. Final appearance of Linda Fairgate (Lar Park Lincoln).
308	5	"Home Again, Home Again"	Michele Lee	John Romano	October 31, 1991	446805	16.1
Greg asks police to pull out the stops in finding Brian, and hires his own detective to find him. Brian is following Greg. Pierce breaks up with his old girlfriend Victoria, and tells Paige about her. Lynette wants Val to help her with her IRS problems, but Val declines, saying she is only helping her to read. Anne decides to do a call-in radio talk show. Frank and Debbie continue dating. Claudia has nightmares of someone needing medication. Kate thinks she faked the suicide, but Karen convinces her to talk to Claudia. Kate makes up with her, but says she still cannot live with her.
309	6	"Business with Pleasure"	Menachem Bonetski	Rachel Cline	November 7, 1991	446806	15.8
Karen tells Claudia that she has been saying "Rosa" in her sleep. Claudia says she does not know a Rosa, but when Karen sees a letter signed Rosa, Claudia says Rosa was her mother's nurse but that she was used to calling her "Miss Barth." Victoria has a hard time getting over Pierce. Joseph kisses Kate, and they both feel awkward about it. Brian kills Greg's detective, so Greg asks Mack to make sure the police get him. Tidal Energy needs shoreline space for their experiments, and Greg wants to block them, so they both court a new member of the shoreline commission. Tidal Energy gets its permit, and Greg's disappointed.
310	7	"1001 Nights of Anne Matheson"	Nancy Malone	James Magnuson	November 14, 1991	446807	15.9
Anne's show is a success, and she tells Benny that she is getting her own apartment. He is upset because he has fallen in love with her. Joseph quits the University to work full time at Tidal Energy. Joseph and Kate declare their love for one another and sleep together. Debbie breaks up with Frank because she wants a serious relationship. Pierce has nightmares of sailing in a storm with Victoria. Victoria tells Paige that Pierce has a dark side and will turn on her, but Paige does not believe her. Victoria tells Pierce she still loves him, and asks if Paige knows about the data list. Pierce tells her to leave him alone. Brian follows Greg to Meg's birthday party. After the party, he pulls a gun on Karen and Meg in the backyard.
311	8	"House of Cards"	Kevin Dobson	James Magnuson	November 21, 1991	446808	19.9
Brian holds Karen, Mack, Jason and Meg hostage. He demands that Greg come over. They leave him several messages, but he does not call back. Brian sends Mack to cash some bonds, and starts to kiss Karen, but Mack gets back. Greg finally calls and Brian demands money and a car, or he'll hurt Meg. Brian has tied up Mack, but Meg unties him. Julie barges in and Mack and Brian struggle for the gun, and Jason is shot in the leg. Karen gets the gun and holds it on Brian until the police arrive. Paramedics tell Jason he only has a flesh wound.
312	9	"Victoria's Secret"	Lorraine Senna Ferrara	Donald Marcus	December 5, 1991	446809	15.1
Meg and Mack have a hard time getting over the hostage situation, but Karen tells Mack she will not live in a high security home, or Brian will have won. Jason wins the essay contest, but does not want to go to Sweden. Tidal Energy's life sized model does not work. Joseph says he can fix it, but it will take a lot of money. Gary decides to mortgage the ranch. Claudia receives an obituary that says Rosa Barth died. Victoria tells Greg she will give him information that will bring Pierce down. She follows Paige around, and Paige finds Victoria in her bed and asks Pierce why she is doing this. Pierce storms out.
313	10	"Lost at Sea"	Michael Lange	Donald Marcus	December 12, 1991	446810	16.3
Mack advises Gary not to mortgage the ranch, and Val's upset that Gary does not know when to cut his losses, and Gary's mad that no one believes in him. Frank misses Debbie. The radio station throws a party for Anne, and she makes them invite Benny. Benny falls down the stairs and pretends he cannot move and says he will sue them. Greg tells Paige that 10 years ago Pierce took his pregnant girlfriend sailing and she drowned, but the rumor is that he killed her. Pierce disappears. His car is found at the beach, and Paige is really worried about him. Pierce comes home and tells Paige about the boat accident, and not being able to save his girlfriend. He says Victoria put him back together, but would not let go when he did not need her anymore, and that he had no reason to live until he met Paige.
314	11	"Holiday on Ice"	Menachem Bonetski	Rachel Cline	December 19, 1991	446811	14.6
The bank hesitates to loan Gary money because of Pierce's past. Gary yells at him for not telling him. Greg has a renewed interest in Meg, and Mack and Karen are worried. The Ewings spend Christmas with the MacKenzies, and Val tells Karen she misses living in the cul-de-sac. The power goes out, so they play football and sing carols. Claudia and Kate go to Greg's for Christmas. Greg asks Joseph if he can support Kate, and Joseph is offended. Jason leaves for Sweden on Christmas Day. Pierce sees a robe that Anne gave Paige, and is enraged thinking it is from Greg. Paige says it is not, and he tears through her clothes to see what Greg gave her. She tells Pierce to get out.
315	12	"And the Walls Came Tumbling Down"	William Devane	Tricia Brock & John Romano	January 2, 1992	446812	18.6
Mack and Karen decide to let Greg be in Meg's life, but to wait a while before telling her she is adopted. Victoria tells Mack that Pierce killed his last girlfriend and gives Gary numbers to Pierce's former business partners. Gary calls and only gets bad reports. Val is worried that the stress will cause Gary to drink, and he considers it, but goes to an AA meeting. Claudia has Greg get Joseph a job in Massachusetts. Joseph discovers a major flaw in his design, and realizes he'll have to start over from scratch. He refuses to tell Gary, and Kate is angry. Joseph gets the job offer, but does not tell Kate. Alex, Rosa's nephew, shows up at Claudia's. He says he knows her secret and will be staying with her for a while. He comes on to her. Meg takes a liking to Alex. Pierce becomes enraged that Joseph spent Christmas at Greg's and accuses him of giving Greg information. Pierce tries to choke Joseph, but Paige stops him.
316	13	"The Torrents of Winter"	Neal Ahern	James Magnuson	January 9, 1992	446813	17.3
Joseph quits and Gary is furious and punches him out. Gary has to suspend operations, but Val comforts him and says they still have each other. Joseph asks Kate to go with him, but she wants nothing to do with him. Claudia asks Greg why he got him a job in La Jolla instead of MA, and Greg says he wanted to ruin the company, but did not want Kate losing her boyfriend. Greg buys a date with Anne at a charity auction. Frank sends Julie back east to live with relatives. Alex goes through Claudia's bank book and breaks her artifacts. Claudia cooks him dinner and implies the salad dressing is poisoned. Pierce blames Greg for the loss of the company and his breakup with Paige, and tells Greg he will destroy him. Pierce comes up to Paige at the Tidal Energy Ocean Site, and holds her over the rushing water, but she gets away.
317	14	"Fair Warning"	Robert Becker	John Romano	January 16, 1992	446814	17.1
Pierce makes charts about Greg, and decides that his first "line" to him will be Claudia. Greg offers Paige her job back. Greg and Anne go on a date. Karen's boss wants her to do a show about Gary losing his money, so she quits. Alex throws a party for Claudia where he gives her a portrait of her mother, Ruth Sumner Galveston. After the party Alex tells Claudia that he was there when Ruth tried to reach for her medication, but the bottle broke, and instead of helping her, Claudia just stood there and let her die. He says he has the cancelled checks that Claudia sent Rosa every month to keep her quiet. Gary is really hurting as the ranch is auctioned off. The Ewings move back to the cul-de-sac. This episode briefly shows Richard Avery (John Pleshette) in archive footage from the pilot.
318	15	"Letting Go"	Joan Van Ark	Rachel Cline & James Magnuson	January 23, 1992	446815	17.2
Pierce tells Victoria that if she gives him info on Greg, he'll sleep with her. Pierce chats with Claudia about Kate. Pierce goes to Paige's and packs. He throws her against the dresser and tells her he is after Greg. Paige tells Greg to get a bodyguard. Greg and Anne finally sleep together. Greg brings Mary Lou Retton to Meg's gymnastic meet. Mac, Peggy and Frank think they have won the lottery, and search all over for the ticket. They finally find it, but they'd written the numbers down wrong. Gary agrees to run the ranch for the new owner, but is frustrated when they does not see eye-to-eye on how to run it. He quits, so Val sells her wedding ring for money. The jeweler calls Gary, and he buys it back.
319	16	"Baths and Showers"	Robert Lewis	James Magnuson	January 30, 1992	446816	16.7
Pierce blackmails Mort into giving him information on Greg's business deals. Greg suspects a leak, so Mort tells Pierce he cannot risk helping him anymore. Kate's old tennis friend Vanessa shows up and asks to stay with Kate. Claudia wants Alex out, so she tells Greg that he is blackmailing her, and that Ruth was in pain, so she let her die. Greg gives Alex a job so he can keep an eye on him. Alex asks Kate out. Claudia wants him to leave Kate alone, so she sleeps with Alex. Alex goes to pick up Kate, and tells Kate that Vanessa's really good looking. Val's publisher asks her to write a biography of Greg. No one wants her to do it, and Mack and Karen are scared of how it will affect Meg and Paige, but Val decides to go ahead with it.
320	17	"Denials"	Kevin Dobson	Lisa Seidman	February 6, 1992	446817	16.3
Claudia wants Alex to move out. Alex flirts with Vanessa and they almost kiss when Kate walks in. Paige asks Anne to hire Kate at the radio station. Vanessa comes by and sucks up to Anne big time, so Anne hires Vanessa to be her assistant. Val meets with Greg about her book, and Greg is bemused by her earnestness. Pierce tries to ruin Greg's business deal, but it does not work. Pierce screams at Greg in a restaurant and is thrown out. Pierce buys a rifle. Paige has dinner with Anne and Greg at his ranch. As they leave, Greg sees Pierce. He pushes Anne and grabs Paige as Pierce shoots.
321	18	"Dedicated to the One I Love"	Nicholas Sgarro	Joel Okmin	February 27, 1992	446818	16.8
Paige has been shot and is rushed to the hospital. The bullet is removed, but her spine is swollen and she might be paralyzed. Mack tells Karen to go home, and he and Anne go to a diner across the street. Anne feels bad about being a bad mother. Claudia finds Pierce at her house. Pierce wants her to tell Paige that he did not mean to shoot her and he loves her. Claudia plays along and he leaves. Anne is jealous as she watches Greg sit with Paige and stroke her face and hair. Anne tells him that their relationship is over. Vanessa fills in for Anne at the station. Alex brings Vanessa to Greg's office, and they have sex on his desk. Paige wakes up, but has no feelings in her legs and cannot move her toes.
322	19	"Trials and Tribulations"	Craig Denault	Ray Goldstone	March 5, 1992	446819	17.6
Val gets a call from a woman telling her she has information about Greg and Meg. Val agrees to meet her, but Gary follows, thinking it could be Pierce setting her up. Alex invites Kate to dinner. Vanessa's jealous, but says she knows he is doing it to get ahead with Greg. Anne does her show on Paige, and how much she loves her. Paige cries and tells Anne that she really needed to hear those things, and they decide to start over. Paige dares Greg to tell her he loves her. Paige starts to regain feeling in her leg. During physical therapy in a pool, Greg tells her she gave him a scare, and he starts to say he loves her. An orderly interrupts to bring her to x-ray, but instead takes her to the basement. Pierce is there. The orderly runs off, and Pierce knocks her guard out. He gives Paige a shot. She gets groggy and he carries her to a van.
323	20	"Sea of Love"	Charles Siebert	Harry Stern & Stephen Black	March 12, 1992	446820	16.7
Claudia handles Greg's business while he is gone. Alex brings Vanessa to Claudia's, and she catches them sleeping together. Val meets with the mystery woman Mary Robeson. She says that her son Joe worked for Greg and Laura had an affair with him, and Joe is Meg's father, but Greg paid him off. Val does not believe her. Paige wakes up aboard a yacht. Pierce is there, and she realizes he thinks she is Margaret, his girlfriend who died. Paige manages to leave her hospital bracelet on the dock before Pierce takes off with her. Greg hires detectives, and they find the orderly who helped Pierce. He says Pierce used his van, and police find it at the Marina, along with Paige's hospital bracelet. Mack and Greg take off in a boat. They catch up to the yacht, and Mack and Greg jump on. A fight ensues. Pierce and Greg fall into the water, and Greg goes underwater.
324	21	"Do You Love Me?"	Michael Lange	Suzanne Childs	April 2, 1992	446821	17.9
Mary tells Val that Greg is trying to kill her. Val sees a news story that she is missing, and tells Greg about Mary. Greg calls someone and said that he was to be notified when Mary was let out of prison. Mary watches Meg through the McKenzie's window. Greg tells Claudia that he cannot focus, and lets her take over. Claudia berates Alex at work, so he takes Kate out and makes out with her. He tells Claudia not to get on him again, or he and Kate might elope. Pierce's body is not found, so the search is called off. Paige is upset that Greg has avoided her since she is home, and she is not eating or sleeping. Anne and Karen try to get Greg to visit her. Finally Paige goes to see him. He is watching the tape of Laura, and tells Paige that when he was underwater, he saw a tunnel with a light, and Laura told him to go back, but he did not want to. He tells Paige she is better off without him, that people around him die. She says she did not, and they kiss.
325	22	"Little Girl Lost"	Michele Lee	Lisa Seidman	April 9, 1992	446822	18.3
Val goes to Florida against Gary's wishes, where she learns that Mary Robeson was Laura's real mother, and Greg had her set up and sent to prison. She calls to alert Karen, but they cannot find Meg. Meanwhile, Greg has threatened Mary to stay away from Meg and leave town. Greg decides to quit, and gives 33% of his company to Claudia, 33% to Paige, and 33% to Meg, with Mack and Karen as her trustees. Alex sleeps with Kate and tells Claudia and Vanessa he genuinely has feelings for Kate. Claudia fires him, but Paige rehires him, so Claudia threatens to tell Kate about his affair with her and Vanessa. Greg sleeps with Paige, but then pulls away, and says he'll be around. He decides to get away for awhile. Anne wants to get back together with him, and tries to find him when she discovers she is pregnant. Gary decides to build low-rent housing in Michigan. He is/H has mad at Val and tells Karen if she does not return in time, he'll leave without her. Claudia puts out a memo to limit Paige's power. Furious, she leaves to go to Greg's. She starts her car, and suddenly Pierce pops up from her back seat. Final regular appearance of Valene Ewing (Joan Van Ark), however she returns in the show's finale. Final appearance of Frank Williams (Larry Riley). Riley died two months after the airing of this episode, on June 6, 1992.

=== Season 14 (1992–93) ===
No. overall	No. in season	Title	Directed by	Written by	Original release date	Viewers (millions)
326	1	"Found and Lost"	Nicholas Sgarro	Ann Marcus	October 29, 1992	16.6
Pierce pulls a knife on Paige in her car. Alex, realizing that something is wrong, pulls Paige out of the car and beats Pierce unconscious. Pierce is arrested screaming that he loves Paige. Mary returns Meg and tells the MacKenzies that she is Laura's mother. Mary gets a lawyer, Toni Fields, to obtain visitation rights with Meg, but she really wants money. Claudia kicks Alex out. He then decides to crash with Kate. Greg is at a remote cabin, but Anne finds him and tells him she is pregnant. He does not want her to keep the baby, and wants her to leave. She will not, so he goes off hiking and Anne follows. Gary is worried when Val does not return from Florida, but has checked out of her hotel. Pierce tells Paige that his plan was to kill her, then kill himself, so that they could be together forever. Larry Riley and Joan Van Ark are removed from the opening credits.
327	2	"Lovers and Other Strangers"	Lorraine Senna Ferrara	Lisa Seidman	November 5, 1992	14.7
Gary decides to go to Florida to look for Val. Kate asks Vanessa to leave, because Alex is moving in with her. Kate catches Alex and Vanessa in the shower together and kicks them both out. Anne says she is going to keep the baby, so Greg says that in that case they should get married. They return home. Mary decides to bring the MacKenzies to court, so Karen and Mack ask Greg to help. He tells them he'll take care of it. Anne tells Paige that Paige dropped the ball with Greg, and now she is going to marry Greg. Paige breaks down and cries. Greg makes a surprise visit to Mary.
328	3	"The Children's Hour"	Jerome Courtland	James Magnuson	November 12, 1992	15.4
Greg decides to pay off Mary, but she says it is not about money. The MacKenzies are mad that she told Meg about the adoption. Claudia gets Vanessa a job at a music television station, and Alex tries to get back with Kate, and then comes on to Paige. Alex decides to go back east. Greg is appointed to a task force to rebuild Los Angeles after the riots. He tells Paige he wants her and Sumner Group to be part of it. Gary is frustrated that he did not find anything out about Val in Florida. Kate helps to comfort the twins, who are worried. Kate decides to stay at Claudia's for awhile. Nick comes back to town and visits Anne, until Greg sends him away. Anne finds out that she is not pregnant.
329	4	"Rescue Me"	Nicholas Sgarro	Ann Marcus	November 19, 1992	15.4
Ann is told she is starting menopause at an early age. Mary's brother Joe visits Mack and Karen and suggests that a million dollars will appease Mary. Mack throws him out. Nick has his sights set on Claudia and sleeps with her. Joe receives a mysterious call in front of Mary, then returns the call, to a Florida number, and asks them to never call him at Mary's hotel room again. He then directs the caller to take care of the situation. Anne plans her wedding with Greg. She wants a big wedding, but she tells him to keep it small. Mary is angry at Joe about the drugs that have shown up in her room. They both suspect that the drugs have been planted by Greg. Anne is not telling Greg that she is not pregnant. Greg wants his commission to sponsor a sports complex for inner-city youth, and wants Sumner Group to build the complex. In Florida, Gary discovers Val has been kidnapped. He chases Val and the kidnappers in his car. The car that Val is in crashes and blows up.
330	5	"Love and Death"	Menachem Bonetski	Lisa Seidman	December 3, 1992	16.4
Kate comforts Gary and the twins about Val's death. Gary and Kate start to kiss, but he says he cannot. A memorial service is held, and Betsy runs out, not believing Val is dead. Karen's upset over Val's death. Greg appoints Bill Nolan, an ex-baseball player to his commission. Bill antagonizes Paige, but she agrees to go out with him, and to back the sports complex. Anne confides in Mack that she is not pregnant, but is taking fertility pills. Mack thinks she should tell Greg, but she does not. Anne wants Paige to attend the wedding, but she will not, because she still loves Greg. Before the wedding, Greg tells Carlos he feels like he is going to prison, and has a better idea. Greg lets himself into Paige's apartment, but sees her in bed with Bill. Greg then decides to go to the church and marry Anne. This episode features a rare reference to Lucy Ewing (Charlene Tilton), who is said to be travelling around Europe, referencing her 1990 exit storyline in the thirteenth season of Dallas.
331	6	"The Price"	Michele Lee	James Magnuson	December 10, 1992	15.0
Paige tells Bill she slept with him on the rebound. He still wants to go out, but she rejects him. Nick moves in with Claudia. She buys him an Italian restaurant to keep him in town and in her bed. Nick lets Vanessa know he is in town. she is upset and asks him not to tell her secret. He says he will not as his future might depend on her. Kate feels guilty about her crush on Gary. Meg does not want to see Mary, and Mary tells her if she does not, the judge might make Meg live with her. Joe Robeson tells the MacKenzies he can get Mary out of their life if he pays them. The stress is taking a toll on Mack and Karen's marriage. Mack asks Paige for a million dollars.
332	7	"Bye, Bye Love"	Reza Badiyi	Ann Marcus	December 17, 1992	13.5
Vanessa's scared of being fired, because her ratings are low. She finds Anne's fertility pills. Bill receives an offer to play baseball in Japan, and asks Paige to go with him, but she says she is not in love with him. Gary takes a job overseeing the building of the sports complex. Karen's upset that Mack will not talk to her. Karen tells Toni that Mary only wants money. Toni asks Mary, who fires her. Paige cannot get the money, so Mack asks Claudia's help. She tells him to make up a phony charity for the money. Claudia gets a million dollars, but only gives Mack half, keeping the other half for herself and Nick's restaurant. Mack puts the money in a briefcase with a tracking device. He asks Gary to tape him giving it to Mary. However, the battery in Gary's video camera dies, so he takes a battery from a tourist. The tourist, trying to retrieve the battery, blocks Gary's shot. Mary walks off with the money.
333	8	"A Death in the Family"	Nicholas Sgarro	Donald Marcus	January 7, 1993	15.1
Vanessa tells Anne she wants $2,000 a week to keep her secret. Anne's upset that Greg spends all his time on the committee and not with her. Anne falls off a horse and tells Greg she lost their baby. Nick gives Claudia a necklace. Karen's upset that Mack tried to set Mary up. Mack's upset Gary did not get it on tape. Mary gives her brother Joe some money, but says she is going to see Meg until they give her the rest of the million. Mack's upset because he thought Mary was out of their life. As he knocks on her door, she decides to record the conversation, and hides the recorder from Mack's view. He yells at her and her neighbor comes to see if she is okay. Anne learns that Greg had Bill sent to Japan, Greg defends it by saying he does not want Paige's life ruined by Bill. Karen decides to talk to Mary. She goes to her apartment and finds it trashed and Mary dead on the floor.
334	9	"Some Like it Hot"	Michele Lee	Lisa Seidman	January 14, 1993	15.2
Kate helps Gary hire a housekeeper, and tells him that she has feelings for him. Vanessa's upset that Anne will not give her money. Anne tells Greg she was never pregnant, but that she will be a good wife. Greg tells her it is a marriage of convenience, and she is never to bring up Paige to him. Karen finds the tape Mary made of her meeting with Mack. She hides it before she calls the police. They put Tom Ryan in charge. Mack burns the tape, but Mary had sent a copy to Toni, which she gives the police. Tom wants to know where he got the money. Claudia tells Tom that Mack filed papers with her for "Pacific Preservation Co." and forged her signature to get a million dollars. Police find Mack's fingerprints on the ashtray that killed Mary, and they arrest him for her murder.
335	10	"The Invisible Man"	Kevin Dobson	Rocci Chatfield	January 21, 1993	15.6
Karen retains Attorney William Reed to represent Mack. Paige and Kate try to calm Meg, who's nervous that her parents are not home. Kate and Gary share a tender moment. Karen and Paige go to the jail where they learn Mack fired his attorney, Reed, the night before. Reed tells Karen that Mack gave explicit orders that he does not want to see her. Mack's bail is set at one million dollars. Paige asks Tom for help but he suggests Mack plead to manslaughter. Detective Pete Reynolds tells Tom he gave Mack marked money to give to Mary. Greg has difficulties getting his urban renewal projects to run on schedule due to lack of cooperation from the deputy mayor. Paige learns that Claudia provided the funds for Nick's new restaurant. Paige questions Mort about the money the Sumner Group gave to an unknown foundation called the Pacific Preservation Society. He explains that Claudia said not to worry about it. Paige concludes that half of that money went to Mack and the other half to Claudia for Nick's restaurant. Nick asks a scared Vanessa to work for him at his restaurant. Meg is bullied at school because her father is in jail. Karen asks Sumner for a million dollars for Mack's bail money, to which he agrees. While breaking into Claudia's desk at the Sumner Group, Paige finds Sumner lying on Claudia's couch in the dark. He tells Paige to stay away from Tom. Tom tries to kiss Paige, but she slaps him and slams the door on him.
336	11	"The Getaway"	Nicholas Sgarro	James Magnuson	January 28, 1993	N/A
Greg tells Claudia to return her half of the money or he'll make her disappear. Nick gives her the money, but will not tell her how he got it. Nick kisses Anne, but she does not want to mess things up with Greg. Gary hires Kate to work on the sports complex. She convinces a couple who are holding up construction to move, but they later change their mind. Kate kisses Gary, but he pushes her away. Out on bail, Mack investigates who killed Mary. Toni decides to help Mack. Gary gets a report that Joe kidnapped Val, so he decides to go back to Florida and asks Kate to watch the twins. Mack wants to go to, but Karen says he would be jumping bail. Mack sneaks out in the middle of the night and leaves Karen a note.
337	12	"Call Waiting"	Beth Brickell	Donald Marcus	February 4, 1993	16.2
Greg does not know why construction of the sports arena is stalled and tries to bulldoze the Carters' house, not realizing they still live there. The incident is on the news. Greg decides to quit the committee and go back to Sumner Group but Paige tells him that Claudia will put up a fight. Tom wants to interview Mack so Karen and Peggy cover for him. Karen asks Paige to help, so Paige spends the day with Tom. The police discover that someone is using marked money. It is Joe Robeson and Paige helps Tom arrest him. Joe is questioned but denies killing Mary and says the money is his savings. Tom figures out that Mack jumped bail and wants to put out a warrant for his arrest but Paige asks him to wait for 24 hours.
338	13	"Farewell, My Lovely"	Nicholas Sgarro	Lisa Seidman	February 11, 1993	17.3
Back from Florida, Gary tells Karen that Mary was really Laura's aunt, and Laura's mother died in childbirth. The police drop the charges against Mack, and they let Joe go. Joe meets with Nick, who tells him he was not supposed to have murdered Mary. Then Joe is found dead. Nick tells Vanessa he does not want Treadwell coming to town. Nick has Claudia open a bank account for "Edward Messinger" and gives her a briefcase of money. Paige asks Mack for his shares of Sumner group, but he says he does not care. Kate comes on to Gary again. He says he is not ready and she has pushing him. Mack hires Toni to work with him and says Frank moved to Chicago. Karen is upset that Mack did not tell her about Florida or hiring Toni. He says talking to her is an inquisition. She decides to leave him and stay with Diana in New York.
339	14	"The Way Things Were"	Jerome Courtland	William Devane & Don Mueller	February 11, 1993	17.3
Greg ignores Anne, so she comes on to Nick but will not sleep with him. Greg tells Anne his heart wants what it wants, and it does not want her. Gary tells Kate he has conflicting feelings, but wants to still be friends with her. Mack calls Karen but she has nothing to say to him and puts Meg on the phone. Greg realizes that Karen has left Mack and uses that as an excuse to invite Mack out to drink with the ulterior motive of convincing Mack to give him Meg's shares of The Sumner Group. Paige asks him for the shares and Mack says he already promised them to Greg, but will give them to her instead. Greg blackmails Claudia to sell him her shares. Treadwell calls Nick and Nick tells Claudia she cannot sell because he gave her the half million dollars, she has obligations and she does not know who she is dealing with. He also wants her to put a disc in the Sumner computer. Out bicycling with the twins, a van knocks Kate off the road and knocks her unconscious. Diana Fairgate (Claudia Lonow) returns in a guest role for the next three episodes.
340	15	"Hints and Evasions"	Joan Van Ark	Ray Goldstone	February 25, 1993	15.9
Upon realizing that Nick's warning about Claudia not knowing who she was dealing with was related to Kate's accident, Claudia agrees to keep her share. Nick says he needs to know Paige's strength and weaknesses, now that she has the MacKenzies' shares. Tom investigates Kate's hit and run, and Paige tells him that there is probably a link to whoever gave Claudia money. Gary tells Kate that she needs to find someone younger and that he does not want any more children. Upset, Kate decides to go away. Tom, trying to find Nick, meets Vanessa, and they flirt outrageously. Vanessa asks Tom for protection, and tells him Nick is involved with Treadwell. She says she was Treadwell's mistress, that he is ruthless and has a huge illegal empire in Europe, and now wants to take over the Sumner Group. Tom tells Nick he wants in on the action, because he can control Paige.
341	16	"My Kingdom for a Horse"	Victor Lobl	Howard Lakin	March 4, 1993	14.9
Diana tells Karen she should give Mack another chance. Greg buys a racehorse for $10 million. Anne and Nick decide to kidnap it and ask for a $4 million ransom, so they can run away together. Unfortunately, Greg insured it for $15 million, so he will not pay the ransom. Then he discovers Nick and Anne have it. Vanessa and Tom sleep together. She tells him that she ran away from Treadwell because he was bored with her and she thought he would kill her. She came to L.A. and Nick threatened to tell Treadwell where she was. One of Treadwell's men drops off a case for Nick at the restaurant. Vanessa pries it open and discovers that it is a high-powered rifle.
342	17	"Day of the Assassin"	Nicholas Sgarro	Donald Marcus & James Stanley	March 11, 1993	16.5
Greg has Claudia and Kate stay at the ranch where he has hired extra security. Claudia sells her shares to Greg so she will not be in danger. Gary tells Kate he wants her in his life and they kiss. Treadwell and his men beat Nick up. Anne tends his wounds and he tells her about Treadwell. A mailboy shoots Greg, but he is wearing a bulletproof vest. Tom brings Paige to his apartment so she will be safe, and they kiss. Vanessa comes by but runs away, and Tom runs after her. Mack goes to New York and tells Karen he loves her, and that their marriage is worth fighting for. Mort tells Greg that the Burton Tech. data base is being ruined by a virus. Paige and Greg decide to fly there to see what is going on. Security guards check the plane, but one of them plants a bomb. Vanessa sleeps with Treadwell and overhears a call that the bomb will go off in 20 minutes. Vanessa calls Tom who calls the airport, but the plane has taken off.
343	18	"Just Like Old Times – Part 1"	Jerome Courtland	Lisa Seidman	May 13, 1993	19.6
Tom talks Greg and Paige through disarming the bomb, and they do with 2 seconds to spare. Treadwell is angry that the bomb did not work and that Val escaped. Disguised, Val gets off a bus and dyes her hair brown. She has flowers delivered to Gary with a card that says to meet her, and "I've never seen the ocean." He has Kate watch the twins and meets her. They have a tearful reunion at her motel. He brings her to Karen's, who's shocked, and she tells them about Treadwell. Tom asks Paige to marry him. Nick begs Claudia for money and says Treadwell is after him because he did not kill Greg and Paige. Claudia tells Greg she will tell him where Nick is for $5 million and a job in Monaco. Greg asks Nick where Treadwell is, and Tom comes in and brings Nick to the station. Nick asks for protection, and says he does not know where Treadwell is, but knows someone who does. Nick goes to someone and says that Treadwell is out of control and needs to be stopped. It is Abby, and she tells him she will take care of it. Valene Ewing (Joan Van Ark) and Abby Cunningham (Donna Mills) return as special guest stars.
344	19	"Just Like Old Times – Part 2"	Jerome Courtland	Ann Marcus	May 13, 1993	19.6
Treadwell is going to shoot Nick, so Vanessa shoots Treadwell. Tom record it as in self-defense, so no charges are filed. With Treadwell out of the way, Val is free, and she and the twins have a tearful reunion. Gary tells her about Kate, but says he never loved anyone the way he loved her. Kate's upset and decides to go away. Karen and Mack yell at each other, and suddenly realize that things are back to "normal" and start to laugh and cry and kiss. Abby tells Greg that she is Treadwell's partner, and is taking over Sumner Group, because she has information to blackmail him. Greg has bought information from Nick and Anne that documents her and Treadwell's illegal dealings, so she cannot blackmail him. With the money they made from Greg, Nick and Anne decide to live in Monaco together. At the airport they run into Claudia, who is also moving to Monaco. Greg finds that Paige has taken over his office, and she reminds him she owns 2/3 of the company, but he can have her old office. He says that if they work together, they will need to spend nights, weekends, even vacations together. She dips him backwards and kisses him. The MacKenzies and Ewings are having a barbecue to celebrate Val's return. Abby drives up and says she heard Claudia's house was on the market, and walks into her old house. Mack shakes his head, and the rest stand there flabbergasted. Final appearance of Claudia Whittaker (Kathleen Noone), as she does not reprise her role in the 1997 miniseries.

=== Knots Landing: Back to the Cul-de-Sac (1997) ===
Title	Directed by	Written by	Original release date	Viewers (millions)
Knots Landing: Back to the Cul-de-Sac – Part 1	Bill Corcoran	Ann Marcus, Lisa Seidman & Julie Sayres	May 7, 1997	13.63
Paige leaves Greg because she wants a baby and he does not. Mack and Karen celebrate their wedding anniversary with a party at Gary and Val's. Abby prepares to move out of the cul-de-sac to a house in Malibu, but the IRS seize all of her assets due to unpaid taxes so she moves in with Karen. Mack begins a class-action lawsuit against Greg on behalf of his former employees, but the case hinges on a document that is missing. Val's latest book "Hostage" is to be turned into a film and the studio team her up with a scriptwriter named Clay McKinney. Meg tries to find out who her biological father is. Kate reappears in Knots Landing with a four-year-old daughter named Molly and tells Gary he is the father. Anne also returns and goes to stay with Greg. Abby tells Greg that she can get him the missing document if he pays her $1 million so she can pay the IRS her back taxes. He agrees so she gets a job working with Gary and Karen at their new construction company where the document is stored. Clay gets drunk and makes advances towards Val. They argue and she pushes him away and leaves his home. The following morning, Clay is found dead in his pool.
Knots Landing: Back to the Cul-de-Sac – Part 2	Bill Corcoran	Ann Marcus, Lisa Seidman & Julie Sayres	May 9, 1997	10.76
The police find one of Val's earrings next to Clay's pool, but Val denies it is hers. Greg agrees to settle the lawsuit with Mack and no longer needs the document, but Abby has already arranged for Robert Simons, an old boyfriend, to steal the document. However, he is interrupted by a security guard whom he accidentally kills so he sets fire to the warehouse to cover his tracks. Mack is going through a mid-life crisis and moves out of the house which upsets Karen. Meg finds out Greg is her natural father and goes to visit him where he plays her the tape recording her mother Laura made for her before she died. Abby, still desperate for money, snoops around in Greg's business affairs for something she can use against him. Instead, he offers her a job overseeing a business operation in Thailand. Val finally tells the police what happened at Clay's house, and they accept his death was accidental. Karen and Mack reconcile, and Karen's son Michael returns home with his fiancée to tell Karen she is going to be a grandmother. At the same time, Abby's son Brian announces that he and Kate are also expecting a baby of their own so Abby is to be a grandmother too.

=== Specials ===
Title	Directed by	Written by	Original release date	Viewers (millions)
The Knots Landing Block Party	Andrew Solt	Joel Okmin	May 13, 1993	14.4
A one-hour non-fiction special, aired just before the series finale, in which the cast and crew discuss their time on the show as it concludes its fourteen season run. Julie Harris, Lisa Hartman, and Constance McCashin also appear.
Knots Landing Reunion: Together Again	Michael Dempsey	Stephen Pouliot	December 2, 2005	6.89
A non-fictional 90 minute reunion special.

== Ratings ==
Knots Landing : U.S. viewers per episode (millions)

Season	Episode number																														Average
Season	1	2	3	4	5	6	7	8	9	10	11	12	13	14	15	16	17	18	19	20	21	22	23	24	25	26	27	28	29	30	Average
1	20.1	23.3	20.0	19.3	23.7	20.3	22.4	20.3	15.9	19.1	17.5	19.2	18.7	–																	20.0
2	17.2	16.6	12.5	16.6	19.5	21.5	19.5	18.5	19.3	20.4	18.4	18.4	22.3	21.5	20.0	18.9	20.4	20.4	–												19.0
3	18.8	17.7	15.6	18.3	16.1	17.5	12.2	20.8	22.5	18.0	17.5	17.4	16.5	18.2	16.5	14.2	13.2	14.9	16.2	15.8	15.4	16.0	–								16.9
4	16.1	16.8	16.9	17.0	17.6	25.6	18.4	16.4	18.5	18.9	18.4	16.3	17.9	18.5	22.9	19.6	18.4	14.9	19.6	19.3	20.2	20.6	–								18.6
5	21.0	19.6	19.8	20.4	18.5	20.3	20.3	21.0	18.8	20.6	21.8	20.4	21.6	20.7	21.8	20.9	20.9	20.1	22.9	19.9	19.8	22.1	22.1	22.4	23.3	–					20.8
6	21.1	19.7	20.5	19.2	19.4	20.7	16.3	21.4	20.2	20.3	20.9	20.3	21.4	18.6	20.4	21.3	22.9	21.9	20.7	18.8	20.3	20.4	16.0	19.4	18.2	19.9	17.8	19.2	20.2	22.9	20.0
7	21.8	21.3	19.7	20.2	18.9	18.5	16.0	21.3	19.9	19.3	20.4	20.6	19.7	19.6	21.5	20.7	20.6	19.4	19.9	20.3	18.6	18.4	17.8	18.1	18.5	18.4	17.9	18.6	14.0	20.0	19.5
8	18.4	18.4	14.8	14.7	17.7	16.7	15.6	15.4	15.7	14.2	20.0	13.9	16.7	17.3	16.9	18.9	19.4	18.9	18.8	16.1	17.7	16.9	17.5	15.7	16.1	17.9	16.4	16.0	16.3	18.7	16.9
9	15.2	14.8	16.5	15.8	13.4	14.8	15.2	14.3	15.5	14.7	16.6	15.3	17.0	16.0	16.1	16.4	16.5	17.2	15.5	15.2	16.7	17.2	15.3	16.5	16.7	16.8	16.0	15.6	17.8	–	15.8
10	24.1	21.5	21.9	20.2	24.2	19.1	22.5	21.3	22.2	21.8	22.8	23.3	24.2	20.0	23.1	24.7	24.9	24.8	24.4	23.3	22.7	22.2	22.7	21.8	21.3	21.8	25.0	25.0	–		22.7
11	22.8	20.8	21.5	21.7	21.4	20.6	19.0	18.5	18.4	19.4	19.2	20.9	20.0	19.5	19.0	20.1	19.0	20.0	20.1	20.8	20.7	20.6	16.8	19.8	20.7	20.9	18.7	20.2	20.0	–	20.0
12	21.2	22.1	20.1	17.7	20.2	19.2	19.9	21.1	20.3	19.1	19.0	19.6	21.4	20.6	18.6	17.3	16.6	19.1	19.4	19.3	16.9	18.0	19.6	18.1	18.2	20.1	20.1	–			19.4
13	18.0	16.7	17.5	16.5	16.1	15.8	15.9	19.9	15.1	16.3	14.6	18.6	17.3	17.1	17.2	16.7	16.3	16.8	17.6	16.7	17.9	18.3	–								17.0
14	16.6	14.7	15.4	15.4	16.4	15.0	13.5	15.1	15.2	15.6	N/A	16.2	17.3	17.3	15.9	14.9	16.5	19.6	19.6	–											16.1

Audience measurement performed by Nielsen Media Research
