= Paige Matheson =

- Knots Landing character
- Portrayed by: Nicollette Sheridan; Patricia Barry (dream; future)
- Duration: 1986–1993, 1997
- First appearance: May 8, 1986 (Episode: "Thicker Than Water")
- Last appearance: May 9, 1997 (Knots Landing: Back to the Cul-de-Sac)
- Created by: David Jacobs
In-universe information
- Occupation: CEO of Sumner Group; Former Executive at Tidal Energy; Former Executive at Sumner Group; Personal Assistant to Greg Sumner at Sumner Group; Former Art Dealer; Former Hostess at Lotus Point
- Parents: Mack MacKenzie; Anne Matheson
- Stepfather: Niels Matheson
- Stepmother: Karen MacKenzie
- Siblings: Meg MacKenzie (adopted)
- Grandparents: Peter MacKenzie; Anna MacKenzie; Russell Winston; Barbara Winston
- Aunts and uncles: Megan MacKenzie
- Other relatives: Mike MacKenzie; Sean MacKenzie

Paige Matheson is a fictional character from the CBS soap opera Knots Landing, a long-running serial about middle class life on the fictional cul-de-sac known as Seaview Circle in Los Angeles, California. She was played by actress Nicollette Sheridan between 1986 and 1993. She debuted in the penultimate episode of the seventh season and remained in the series until the final episode in 1993. The character made her last television appearance in 1997, when she appeared in the Knots Landing reunion miniseries Knots Landing: Back to the Cul-de-Sac.

== Appearances ==
Sheridan debuted on Knots Landing in 1986, also playing her character's mother, Anne Winston Matheson, in flashbacks. She stayed with the series until its cancellation in 1993. Sheridan made a cameo appearance as Paige in part one of the reunion miniseries Knots Landing: Back to the Cul-de-Sac, which aired on May 7, 1997.

== Storylines ==
Paige arrives in Knots Landing in 1986 on the MacKenzies' doorstep, claiming to be the daughter of Mack MacKenzie (Kevin Dobson). She moves in with the MacKenzies, and has an affair with her stepbrother Michael (Patrick Petersen). It is later discovered by Mack's wife Karen (Michele Lee) that Paige had fled from her wealthy grandparents and mother Anne (Michelle Phillips) by faking her death. Anne turns up to reunite with her daughter and to get Mack back into her life, but she fails. Out of spite, she tells Mack and Paige that Greg Sumner (William Devane) is Paige's real father. However, a paternity test later confirms that her father is Mack. Paige is employed at Lotus Point, where she meets Peter Hollister (Hunt Block) and they began a relationship. During an argument, Paige accidentally stabs Peter and kills him. Paige begins to work for Greg and they have an affair. She falls in love with him, but is crushed when Greg marries Abby Ewing (Donna Mills). Paige meets corrupt cop Tom Ryan (Joseph Gian) and their relationship results in a marriage proposal. However, on their wedding day, Paige is left at the altar. Unknown to her, Greg had blackmailed Tom to leave Paige. When Paige discovers this, she and Tom briefly rekindle their relationship. Paige later meets Pierce Lawton (Bruce Greenwood), and they work with Gary Ewing (Ted Shackelford) on a tidal energy project. This relationship takes a scary turn when Pierce shoots Paige and later kidnaps her after she had recovered. During this time, she and Greg fall in and out of love again. A while later, Greg leaves shares of the Sumner Group to Paige, Karen, and Mack (in trust for his daughter Meg), and to his sister Claudia Whittaker (Kathleen Noone). Paige and Claudia often fight over control of the company. Eventually, Claudia sells her shares back to Greg, and Mack gives Meg's shares to Paige, giving her majority control of the company. Paige and Greg finally get back together, but after a few years they break up once again when Greg refuses to have children. Paige moves to New York.

== Reception ==
=== Accolades ===
Group	Category	Year	Result	Ref.
Soap Opera Digest Award	Outstanding Lead Actress: Prime Time	1990	Won	
Soap Opera Digest Award	Outstanding Heroine: Prime Time	1991	Won	
