= List of Knots Landing characters =

Knots Landing is an American prime time television soap opera that aired on CBS from December 27, 1979, to May 13, 1993. The show was created by David Jacobs as a spin-off of Dallas and initially centred around the lives of four married couples living on a cul-de-sac in a fictitious coastal suburb of Los Angeles.

Spanning fourteen years, the show became one of the longest-running primetime dramas on television. In 1997, the cast reunited for a two-part miniseries titled Knots Landing: Back to the Cul-de-Sac.

== Overview ==
Character	Actor	Seasons														
Character	Actor	1	2	3	4	5	6	7	8	9	10	11	12	13	14	Reunion
Kenny Ward	James Houghton	Main	Main	Main	Main											
Ginger Ward	Kim Lankford	Main	Main	Main	Main											Guest
Karen Fairgate MacKenzie	Michele Lee	Main	Main	Main	Main	Main	Main	Main	Main	Main	Main	Main	Main	Main	Main	Main
Laura Avery Sumner	Constance McCashin	Main (Note: McCashin departs in "Noises Everywhere (Part 2)" (ep. 9.11).)	Main	Main	Main	Main	Main	Main	Main	Main						
Sid Fairgate	Don Murray	Main (Note: Murray departs in "Critical Condition" (ep. 3.2).)	Main	Main												
Richard Avery	John Pleshette	Main	Main	Main	Main					Guest						
Gary Ewing	Ted Shackelford	Main	Main	Main	Main	Main	Main	Main	Main	Main	Main	Main	Main	Main	Main	Main
Valene Clements Ewing Gibson Waleksa Ewing	Joan Van Ark	Main	Main	Main	Main	Main	Main	Main	Main	Main	Main	Main	Main	Main	Guest	Main
Abby Fairgate Cunningham Ewing Sumner	Donna Mills		Main	Main	Main	Main	Main	Main	Main	Main	Main				Guest	Main
Mack MacKenzie	Kevin Dobson				Main	Main	Main	Main	Main	Main	Main	Main	Main	Main	Main	Main
Lilimae Clements	Julie Harris	Guest		Recurring	Main (Note: Harris departs in "Flight of the Sunbirds" (ep. 9.9).)	Main	Main	Main	Main	Main						
Diana Fairgate	Claudia Lonow	Recurring	Recurring	Recurring	Recurring	Main	Guest								Recurring	Guest
Ben Gibson	Douglas Sheehan					Main	Main	Main	Main							
Greg Sumner	William Devane					Main (Note: Devane is added to the opening credits from "Marital Privilege" (ep. 5.4).)	Main	Main	Main	Main	Main	Main	Main	Main	Main	Main
Joshua Rush	Alec Baldwin						Main (Note: Baldwin departs in "Rise and Fall" (ep. 7.10).)	Main								
Ciji Dunne	Lisa Hartman				Recurring											
Cathy Geary	Lisa Hartman					Recurring	Main	Main								
Jill Bennett	Teri Austin						Guest	Recurring	Recurring	Recurring	Main					
Paige Matheson	Nicollette Sheridan							Guest	Recurring	Recurring	Main	Main	Main	Main	Main	Guest
Olivia Cunningham Dyer	Tonya Crowe		Recurring	Recurring	Recurring	Recurring	Recurring	Recurring	Recurring	Recurring	Recurring	Main				Guest
Michael Fairgate	Patrick Petersen	Recurring	Recurring	Recurring	Recurring	Recurring	Recurring	Recurring	Recurring	Recurring	Recurring	Main	Main			Guest
Anne Wintson Matheson Sumner	Michelle Phillips								Recurring		Guest	Recurring	Main	Main	Main	Starring
Frank Williams	Larry Riley									Recurring	Recurring	Recurring	Main	Main		
Mary-Frances Sumner	Stacy Galina					Recurring (Note: The character is played by Danielle Brisebois in season 5.)						Recurring				
Kate Whittaker	Stacy Galina												Recurring	Main	Main	Starring
Claudia Whittaker	Kathleen Noone												Recurring	Main	Main	

Cast notes

== Main ==
Kenny Ward (James Houghton (original cast), 1979–1983)
A young record producer. During the series, he struggles to stay faithful to his wife Ginger, cheating on her with Sid Fairgate's daughter Annie, a singer named Sylvie (Stevie Louise Vallance) and Kristin Shepard from Dallas. He settles down and becomes more responsible after Ginger gives birth to their daughter, Erin Molly Ward, in 1981. After four seasons, the family move to Nashville, Tennessee to pursue Ginger's career.

Ginger Kilman Ward (Kim Lankford (original cast), 1979–1983; 1997)
A kindergarten teacher, with country music aspirations. She is married to Kenny. They separate due to his infidelity, and she briefly dates pediatrician, Carl Russelman, however reunites with Kenny after the birth of their daughter, Erin Molly, in 1981. She leaves with her family for Nashville in 1983 to pursue a career as a country music singer. 14 years later, Ginger returns to the cul-de-sac for the anniversary party in Knots Landing: Back to the Cul-de-Sac, where she reveals her and Kenny are now divorced.

Karen Cooper Fairgate MacKenzie (Michele Lee (original cast), 1979–1993; 1997)
The wife of Sid Fairgate, and the mother of his children Diana, Eric and Michael Fairgate, who is also the principal character of the series. Later, she marries Mack MacKenzie, and adopts Meg, daughter of Laura Avery and Greg Sumner. She works as a community activist and later proves herself as a businesswoman when she takes over Knots Landing Motors after Sid's death, and becomes joint-owner of Lotus Point with Gary and Abby. She is best friends with Val, who she bonded with from the first day she arrived in Knots Landing. Lee is the only cast member to appear in all 344 episodes, as well as the Back to the Cul-de-Sac miniseries.

Laura Murphy Avery Sumner (Constance McCashin (original cast), 1979–1987)
The wife of Richard Avery, and mother of their children Jason and Daniel. Initially an oppressed housewife, she went onto become a successful real estate agent. Later, she marries Greg Sumner, and has his daughter, Meg. Laura died in 1987 of a brain tumor.

William Sidney "Sid" Fairgate (Don Murray (original cast), 1979–1981)
Owner of Knots Landing Motors, a used car dealership, and the husband of Karen. He is the father of her three children, Diana, Eric and Michael, as well as Annie, from his first wife Susan Philly. He is hard working, fair and at times stubborn. His car is sabotaged and plunges off a cliff in the second season finale, he dies from his injuries at the start of season three.

Richard Avery (John Pleshette (original cast), 1979–1983; 1987)
A corporate lawyer, and later a restaurant owner. Unhappily married to Laura, he struggles when she becomes a successful real-estate agent. He suffered a nervous breakdown in 1982, holding Laura hostage at gunpoint, before getting a divorce and leaving town in 1983. He returned briefly in 1987 to attend her funeral and take custody of their two sons Jason and Daniel.

Garrison Arthur "Gary" Ewing (Ted Shackelford (original cast), 1979–1993; 1997; 2013)
The troubled middle son of Jock and Ellie Ewing and a recovering alcoholic. He was first played by David Ackroyd in Dallas season two, before Shackelford took over the role from season three's "Return Engagements", the backdoor pilot used to set up Knots Landing. He has been married to Valene since they were teenagers, and is the father of their daughter Lucy (a series regular on Dallas) and later, twins Bobby and Betsy Ewing. Upon moving to California, he begins working for Sid at Knots Landing Motors, where he was eventually promoted to vice president. Later, he is fired by Karen after Sid's death, and destroys his marriage to Val when he has an affair with Abby. After his father dies, he inherits $10 million and marries Abby, which ends after a few years. After a relationship with the scheming Jill Bennett, he remarries Valene. Shackelford is the only cast member along with Michele Lee to remain in the series throughout its entire run, although Shackelford didn't appear in every episode. He also reprises the role for three episodes of the 2012 revival of Dallas.

Valene "Val" Clements Ewing Ewing Gibson Waleska Ewing (Joan Van Ark (original cast), 1979–1992; 1993; 1997; 2013)
Gary's wife and the mother of his children, Lucy, Bobby and Betsy Ewing (who are born in 1984). Valene is from Shula, Tennessee and married Gary when they were teenagers in the 1960s, but under J. R.'s influence was made an outcast from the Ewing family and became estranged from her daughter Lucy for many years. After remarrying Gary in 1979, the couple moved to Knots Landing, befriending her neighbor Karen. After Gary cheats on her with Abby, Val marries journalist Ben Gibson, and then the psychotic Danny Waleska, before finally marrying Gary for the third time. Van Ark left the show after 13 seasons, with Val presumed dead in a car accident, however returns alive in the two-part series finale. Van Ark also reprises the role in Back to the Cul-de-Sac and for an episode of the 2012 revival of Dallas.

Abby Fairgate Cunningham Ewing Sumner (Donna Mills, 1980–1989; 1993; 1997)
The neighborhood troublemaker. She is the younger sister of Sid, who rarely gets along with his wife Karen. Abby arrives from San Luis Obispo, California after divorcing her first husband, Jeff Cunningham, and begins working as a bookkeeper at Knots Landing Motors. Abby seduces Richard, and later Gary, destroying his marriage to Val. She then marries Gary herself, mainly for his inheritance. She becomes co-owner of Lotus Point with Gary and Karen, before her and Gary divorce. Later Abby marries Greg Sumner to help his political career, but the marriage lasts only a few months before she moves to Japan. Mills had appeared in almost every episode, the moment she joined the cast in season two, with the exception of 1, and left the show after season ten, but returned for the two-part series finale in 1993, and again for Back to the Cul-de-Sac.

Marion Patrick "Mack" MacKenzie (Kevin Dobson, 1982–1993; 1997)
An attorney and federal prosecutor who marries Karen after Sid's death. Later, he works for politician Greg Sumner, his old college friend and eventual rival, before opening his own private practice. Doug Savant plays a younger version of the character from 1986 to 1987. Dobson had appeared in almost every episode, the moment he joined the cast in season 4, with the exception of 4 episodes, in the final season.

Lilimae Clements (Julie Harris, 1980; 1981–1987)
Valene's mother. Though they'd been estranged for many years, after Lilimae virtually abandoned Valene as a teenager in her quest to become a country music singer, Lilimae reappeared in Valene's life for a season one episode. She returns in a recurring role in season three, after moving in with Valene and Gary. She is a series regular from seasons four through nine, before leaving the show to go travelling with her lover Al Baker.

Diana Fairgate Roberts (Claudia Lonow, 1979–1984; 1993; 1997)
Sid and Karen's daughter. She is closer to her aunt Abby than her own mother. Later, she falls in love and marries the sociopathic Chip Roberts (Michael Sabatino). Diana eventually leaves Knots Landing to study fashion designing in New York City, although she returned in a recurring role in season fourteen and in Back to the Cul-de-Sac.

Ben Gibson (Douglas Sheehan, 1983–1987)
Valene's second husband. He was a journalist, who later worked at Abby's television station but disappeared in South America.

Greg Sumner (William Devane, 1983–1993, 1997)
Mack's friend from college and his eventual rival. Initially a politician, Greg became a businessman after inheriting his father's corporation, Galveston Industries. He marries Laura, and is the father of her daughter, Meg. After her death in 1987, Meg is adopted by Karen and Mack. Later, he has an affair with Paige, Mack's daughter, and marries Abby to help his political career. Joshua Devane plays a younger version of the character from 1986 to 1990.

Joshua Rush (Alec Baldwin, 1984–1985)
Lilimae's son whom she abandoned as a baby. He was raised by his preacher father and later became a televangelist. After marrying Cathy Geary, he becomes increasingly unstable and violent. After threatening Val, and trying to kill Cathy, he dies accidentally after falling off a roof.

Ciji Dunne (Lisa Hartman, 1982–1983) & Cathy Geary Rush (Lisa Hartman, 1983–1986)
Ciji is a singer who is murdered, leaving almost everyone in Knots Landing a suspect. Some months later, Ciji's doppelgänger Cathy Geary shows up after being released from prison. Gary tries to help Cathy get a fresh start and falls for her, later it is revealed that Abby hired Cathy to distract him. Despite this, they remain friends. Hartman becomes a series regular in seasons six and seven, and later marries Lilimae's son Joshua Rush, who ends up abusing her.

Jill Bennett (Teri Austin, 1985–1989)
Mack's former colleague who falls in love with Gary. She becomes threatened by Gary's close friendship with ex-wife Valene and tries to murder her. She accidentally kills herself after locking herself in the trunk of Gary's car in an attempt to frame him for kidnapping.

Paige Matheson (Nicollette Sheridan, 1986–1993; 1997)
Daughter of Mack and Anne Matheson. During the series, she is romantically involved with Karen's younger son Michael Fairgate, Peter Hollister, and Greg Sumner. Later, she marries the mentally unstable Pierce Lawton, who tries to murder her, and also beds police officer Tom Ryan. By the end of the series she and Greg realize they were meant for one another.

Olivia Cunningham Dyer (Tonya Crowe, 1980–1990; 1997)
Abby's rebellious daughter who became addicted to drugs. She becomes very close to both Valene and Karen, much to Abby's displeasure (the reverse of how Diana was with her mother). Later she marries a mobster's nephew Harold Dyer against her mother's wishes, so Abby cuts her off financially.

Michael Fairgate (Patrick Petersen, 1979–1991; 1997)
Son of Sid and Karen. During the series, he is romantically involved with Mack's daughter Paige Matheson and later has an affair with his older brother Eric's wife, Linda Fairgate.

Anne Winston Matheson Sumner (Michelle Phillips, 1987; 1989; 1990–1993; 1997)
Mack's first love and mother of their daughter Paige. She initially tried to split up Mack and Karen, but after failing she turned her attentions to Greg and also attempted to cheat Paige out of her inheritance from her grandfather.

Frank Williams (Larry Riley, 1988–1992)
Frank moved to Knots Landing with his wife Pat and daughter Julie as part of the witness protection program. He eventually took a job in Mack's law practice.

Mary-Frances Sumner (Danielle Brisebois, 1983–1984; Stacy Galina, 1990) & Kate Whittaker (Stacy Galina, 1990–1993, 1997)
Mary-Frances is Greg's daughter. She is played by Danielle Brisebois in a recurring role in season five. Stacy Galina takes over the role in season eleven, where she is murdered by her boyfriend Robert Scarrow. Her cousin and doppelgänger Kate, daughter of Greg's sister Claudia, comes to Knots Landing in season twelve. She is a tennis player working on a scholarship back East, but breaks her arm in an accidental collision with Gary Ewing, which ends her tennis career. Despite this, the two later become romantically involved. Galina becomes a series regular in seasons thirteen and fourteen. Shiri Appleby plays a younger version of Mary-Frances in 1990.

Claudia Sumner Whittaker (Kathleen Noone, 1990–1993)
Greg's sister, who moved to town under the guise of accompanying her daughter Kate to college. In reality, she came to meddle in Greg's affairs.

== Recurring ==
Eric Fairgate (Steve Shaw, 1979–1987; 1989–1990)
Eldest son of Karen and Sid Fairgate. In later seasons, he has a brief romance with Greg's daughter Mary-Frances, before marrying Linda, who has an affair with his younger brother Michael while he is working in Saudi Arabia.

Jason Avery (Justin Dana, 1979–1980; Danny Gellis, 1980–1982; Danny Ponce, 1983–1985; Matthew Newmark, 1986–1987)
Oldest son of Laura and Richard Avery. After Laura dies from a brain tumor, he and Daniel go live with Richard and his second wife.

Brian Cunningham (Bobby Jacoby, 1980–1985; Brian Austin Green, 1986–1989, 1997)
Youngest son of Abby and Jeff Cunningham. He leaves with Abby when she moves to Japan. Green reprises the role in Back to the Cul-de-Sac, where he is engaged and expecting a child with Kate.

Joe Cooper (Stephen Macht) (1982)
Karen's brother, who is an English lecturer in New York. He is briefly Valene's agent when she publishes her first book.

Chip Roberts (Michael Sabatino, 1982–1983)
Val's publicist, who moves in with Val and Lilimae. Later, he has an affair with Diana and gets Ciji pregnant. When it is eventually revealed that his real name is Tony Fenice and that he murdered Ciji, Diana marries him anyway. Lilimae hits him with her car, but he survives, eventually dying when he accidentally falls onto a pitchfork, believing he had seen a resurrected Ciji (when in fact he had seen Cathy, Ciji's lookalike).

Detective Janet Baines (Joanna Pettet, 1983)
A homicide detective investigating Ciji's death, and an old girlfriend of Mack's.

Mark St. Claire (Joseph Chapman, 1983–1984)
A villainous-type character who tried to evade a police dragnet while he had Abby Cunningham as his hostage.

Dr. Mitch Ackerman (Laurence Haddon, 1984–1985)
The doctor who delivered Valene's twins and helped with the ruse that they had died. He later killed himself when confronted by Karen and Mack.

Paul Galveston (Howard Duff, 1984–1985, 1990)
Millionaire industrialist who befriends Gary, leaving his ranch to him after his death. He is later revealed to be Greg's biological father and a past lover of Ruth Sumner, marrying her on his deathbed.

Ruth Sumner Galveston (Ava Gardner, 1985)
A wildlife photographer and mother of Greg and Claudia. She had a strained relationship with Greg's wife Laura.

Peter Hollister (Hunt Block, 1985–1987)
Jill Bennett's brother, who arrived posing as Greg's half-brother through Paul Galveston. After working at the Sumner Group, he turned to local politics and started a relationship with Paige, who eventually killed him. Abby, suspecting Olivia was responsible, buried his body in concrete at Lotus Point.

Sylvia Lean (Ruth Roman, 1986–1987)
A former secretary and lover of Paul Galveston, who conceived a child with him that died shortly after birth. Tracked down by Peter Hollister to pose as his mother.

Jean Hackney (Wendy Fulton, 1986–1987)
A malevolent CIA associate from Ben Gibson's past, who tries to bring him back into field work.

Charles Scott (Michael York, 1987–1988)
Childhood sweetheart of Abby, who returned and romanced her in order to get control of Lotus Point for his own projects. The pair married, only for Abby to get an annulment the next day.

Linda Fairgate (Lar Park Lincoln, 1987; 1989–1991)
Eric Fairgate's wife who had an affair with his brother Michael, and later on have a romantic relationship with her boss Greg Sumner. She is eventually murdered by Brian Johnston.

Johnny Rourke (Peter Reckell, 1988–1989)
Singer and ex-lover of Paige Matheson.

Pat Williams (Lynne Moody, 1988–1990)
Wife of Frank Williams and mother of Julie. A former doctor, she and her family were in the Witness Protection Program. She died shortly after being hit by Danny Waleska's car – ironically, she had previously saved Danny's life.

Harold Dyer (Paul Carafotes, 1988–1990)
The nephew of a mobster who later became Olivia's husband.

Julie Williams (Kent Masters King, 1988–1991)
Teenage daughter of Frank and Pat Williams. She is responsible for killing Valene's abusive third husband, Danny Waleska.

Ted Melcher (Robert Desiderio, 1988–1989)
A consultant who worked with Abby and Greg Sumner but later plotted to kill Paige.

Paula Vertosick (Melinda Culea, 1989–1990)
An environmentalist who became close to Mack and had an affair with Greg Sumner.

Amanda Michaels (Penny Peyser, 1989–1990)
Danny's ex-wife and Gary's girlfriend, who teaches Bobby and Betsy's kindergarten class and aspires to be a professional singer.

Virginia "Ginny" Bullock (Betsy Palmer, 1989–1990)
Valene's aunt, who comes to live with her for a while after her apparent suicide attempt.

Danny Waleska (Sam Behrens, 1989–1990)
Valene's violent and psychopathic third husband, who rapes his ex-wife Amanda and kills Pat Williams while drunk-driving. Eventually and inadvertently drowned by Julie Williams.

Detective Tom Ryan (Joseph Gian, 1989–1991; 1993)
A corrupt policeman who was torn between his loyalties to his boss and his relationship with Paige.

Sergeant Levine (Herb Edelman, 1990)
A sympathetic policeman investigating Danny Waleska's murder.

Jason Lochner (Thomas Wilson Brown, 1990–1991)
A teenager with an abusive father who goes to live with Mack and Karen.

Dick Lochner (Guy Boyd, 1990–1991)
Jason's abusive widowed father.

Nick Schillace (Lorenzo Caccialanza, 1990–1991; 1992–1993)
A shady Italian playboy with various failed get-rick-quick schemes, also known as Dimitri Pappas, who became involved with both Anne Matheson and Claudia Whittaker.

Charlotte Anderson (Tracy Reed, 1990–1991)
An English teacher at Jason and Julie's high school who has a relationship with Frank, his first after Pat's death.

Steve Brewer (Lance Guest, 1991)
Claudia's illegitimate son with Paul Galveston, who tries to form a relationship with her when released from prison on parole. Later shot by the police after Claudia plants a gun on him and he tries to flee.

Benny Appleman (Stuart Pankin, 1991)
A small-time conman and former acquaintance of Anne, with whom she moves in after becoming homeless. Benny develops feelings for her while helping her become a late-night radio personality, but after confessing his feelings he is gently rebuffed.

Joseph Barringer (Mark Soper, 1991–1992)
Environmentalist who forms a business with Gary aiming to harness tidal energy, and embarks on a relationship with Kate Whittaker.

Pierce Lawton (Bruce Greenwood, 1991–1992)
A businessman who became involved with Paige but later tried to kill her.

Vanessa Hunt (Felicity Waterman, 1992–1993)
An openly bisexual former professional tennis player from Great Britain, and a former colleague and friend of Kate Whittaker, briefly ranked 13th best player in the world. Hunt's professional tennis career peaked when she lost to Gabriela Sabatini in the Italian Open women's singles final.

Mary Robeson (Maree Cheatham, 1992–1993)
A woman claiming to be Laura Avery Sumner's birth mother, who tries to win custody of Meg from Mack and Karen. The battle abruptly ends when Mack is arrested for her murder.

== Notable guest stars ==
- Karen Allen as Annie Fairgate, Sid's daughter from a previous marriage (1979)
- Patrick Duffy as Bobby Ewing, Gary's brother from Dallas (1979–80, 1982)
- Don "Red" Barry as Jeremiah Clements, Val's father and Lilimae's husband, depicted in a flashback (1980)
- Charlene Tilton as Lucy Ewing, Gary and Val's daughter from Dallas (1980)
- Larry Hagman as J.R. Ewing, Gary's brother from Dallas (1980–82)
- Priscilla Pointer as Beatrice Handleman, mother of Ginger's ex-boyfriend John (1980)
- Helen Hunt as Betsy, friend of Diana's (1980)
- Gary Sinise as Lee Maddox, friend of Eric's (1980)
- Mary Crosby as Kristin Shepard, Gary's sister-in-law from Dallas (1980)
- Diana Douglas as Dr. Charlotte Kramer (1980)
- Conchata Farrell as Mrs. Messinger (1980)
- Jane Elliot as Judy Trent, suffering wife of alcoholic Earl Trent (1980–1981)
- Carol Bruce as Annette Cunningham, Abby's mother-in-law (1981)
- Barry Jenner as Jeff Cunningham, Abby's first ex husband, father of Brian and Olivia (1981)
- Rosemary Prinz as Muriel Warren, the wife of Laura's lover Scooter (1981–1982)
- Zsa Zsa Gabor as herself (1982)
- Billy Curtis as himself (1982)
- Eve McVeagh as Mrs. Green (1982)
- June Lockhart as Hilda Grant (1982)
- Jessica Walter as Victoria Hill, Karen's college friend (1982)
- Millie Perkins as Jane Sumner, Greg's first wife (1983–1984, 1990)
- Albert Salmi as Jonathan Jay Rush, Joshua's father and Lilimae's former lover (1984–1985)
- Dick Sargent as himself (1985)
- Judith Barsi as a bratty girl (1985)
- Red Buttons as Al Baker, Lilimae's love interest (1987)
- Kristy Swanson as Jody Campbell, Michael's demanding girlfriend (1987–1988)
- Bibi Besch as Dr. Sarah Gilbert (1989)
- Gary Oldman as Don Ross (1989)
- Chris Lemmon as Jeff Cameron (1990)
- Stuart Whitman as Mr. Willis (1990)
- Shiri Appleby as Young Mary-Frances Sumner (1990)
- Ren Hanami as Receptionist (1990)
- Robin Strasser as Dianne Kirkwood, Karen's producer (1990)
- Kevin Kilner as Alex Georgi (1990)
- Pam Grier as Lieutenant Guthrie (1990)
- Halle Berry as Debbie Porter, Frank's love interest (1991)
- Marcia Cross as Victoria Broyard, Pierce's ex-girlfriend (1991–92)
- David James Elliott as Bill Nolan, Paige's love interest (1992)
- Mary Lou Retton as herself (1992)
- Billy Bob Thornton as a timberman (1992)
- Virginia Capers as Adele Carter (1993)
