= Laura Avery Sumner =

- Knots Landing character
- Portrayed by: Constance McCashin
- Duration: 1979–87
- First appearance: December 27, 1979 (Episode: "Pilot")
- Last appearance: November 10, 1987 (Episode: "Noises Everywhere – Part 2")
- Created by: David Jacobs
In-universe information
- Occupation: Real estate agent; Former Real estate consultant at Gary Ewing Enterprises
- Parents: Mary Robeson
- Adoptive parents: Hank Murphy; Marguerite Murphy
- Siblings: 1 unnamed brother 2 unnamed sisters
- Spouse: Richard Avery; Greg Sumner
- Children: Jason Avery; Daniel Avery; Meg MacKenzie
- Grandparents: Harriet Murphy (adoptive)
- Aunts and uncles: David Robeson; Joe Robeson; Loretta Robeson
- Nieces and nephews: Brian; Erin

Laura Avery Sumner (maiden name Murphy) is a fictional character from the CBS soap opera Knots Landing, a long-running serial about middle class life on the fictional cul-de-sac known as Seaview Circle in Los Angeles, California. She was played by actress Constance McCashin between 1979 and 1987. She debuted in the pilot episode and remained a principal actor in the series until the ninth-season episode "The Gift of Life".

== Background ==
Laura was adopted as a baby by Hank Murphy (Harry Bellaver) and his wife and lived in Pittsburgh. Laura had an older brother and two older sisters. By age 12, Laura's adoptive mother died. Laura graduated high school and did some post–high school studies during which she met law student Richard Avery (John Pleshette). Laura was very much attracted to Richard, because he gave her the attention she was always seeking. The two were later married, and Laura had to quit school and work hard to support Richard through law school. Richard graduated from law school and became a lawyer. Later, Laura and Richard had a son, Jason, and the family moved to Knots Landing.

== Storylines ==
Laura lived a rather boring life in Knots Landing trying to help support her husband through law school and being a mother. When Richard's dependence on her began to wane as his job as a lawyer brought in good money, Laura began to seek attention from other men, which resulted in her getting raped. Later, Laura wanted to work, much to the objection of Richard, and she studied to become a real-estate agent. Meanwhile, Richard lost his job and their marriage began to deteriorate further. Laura began an affair with her boss, Scooter, while Richard started seeing neighbor Abby Cunningham (Donna Mills). As Laura's career grew, Richard's wilted and the marriage suffered more. Laura decided to divorce Richard until she discovered she was pregnant. However, Laura decided she would leave Richard and caused him to have a mental breakdown. When Richard returned home, after being institutionalized, there was a glimmer of hope and they tried to rebuild their marriage. They opened a restaurant together named Daniel, after their newborn son.

Richard became jealous of Laura's closeness with singer Ciji Dunne (Lisa Hartman), and made no attempt to hide his disdain for her. After Ciji was murdered, Richard felt remorseful and tried to apologize to Laura, but she refused to forgive him. Believing that Laura no longer loved him, Richard left his family one night and would not return until years later. Laura at first believed Richard left because he had a role in Ciji's death, but as events unfolded, she came to know otherwise and accepted some responsibility for the loss of her marriage.

Laura's life improved as she started working for Gary Ewing Enterprises, although she had to work closely with Abby, There she met Gregory Sumner (William Devane) and they began an affair. However, Abby and Greg's mother, Ruth (Ava Gardner), succeeded in breaking them up but Laura and Greg both realized they needed each other and they got married. When Laura announced she was pregnant, Greg told her he didn't want to be a father again but Laura stubbornly decided to have the baby and Greg later warmed to the idea. After giving birth to her daughter, Marguerite Catherine, Laura is diagnosed with an incurable brain tumor. Laura chose to enter a clinic and die alone. When Laura died, Greg had Meg adopted by Laura's best friend, Karen MacKenzie (Michele Lee) and Mack MacKenzie (Kevin Dobson).

== Departure ==
In 1987, the production of Knots Landing was hit by major budget cuts and many actors were let go, including McCashin. Much controversy surrounded this decision made by the producers and was even objected to openly by McCashin herself. McCashin explained to Boston.com in 2009 stating, "I was very hurt the way I was let go for financial reasons. I wish they'd handled my demise better".
