= Valene Ewing =

Fictional character in Knots Landing

- Knots Landing and Dallas character
- Portrayed by: Joan Van Ark; Vanessa Marshall (flashback)
- Duration: 1978–93, 1997, 2013
- First appearance: September 23, 1978; Reunion, Part 1
- Last appearance: March 18, 2013; Ewings Unite! (Dallas)
- Created by: David Jacobs
- Spin-off appearances: Dallas (1978 series); Dallas (2012 series)
In-universe information
- Other names: Valene Clements; Valene Gibson; Valene Waleska; Verna Ellers (pen name)
- Occupation: former waitress Novelist; Screenwriter
- Father: Jeremiah Clements
- Mother: Lilimae Clements
- Half-brothers: Joshua Rush
- Husband: Gary Ewing (1961–62, 1979–83, 1991–); Ben Gibson (1985–1987); Danny Waleska (1990)
- Sons: Bobby Ewing II
- Daughters: Lucy Ewing; Betsy Ewing
- Stepdaughters: Molly Whittaker
- Grandfathers: Joshua Patrick
- Grandmothers: Aura Belle Patrick
- Aunts: Virginia Bullock; June Patrick; Meg Patrick; Edna Patrick

Valene "Val" Ewing, portrayed by Joan Van Ark, is a fictional character in the CBS primetime soap opera Knots Landing, a spin-off from the long-running series Dallas, in which she also appeared. The character originated on Dallas in 1978 as the mother of Lucy Ewing and ex-wife of Gary Ewing (the second son of oil baron Jock and Miss Ellie Ewing). Van Ark made several guest appearances on Dallas before becoming one of the main stars of the spin-off Knots Landing in December 1979, though she continued to make small appearances in Dallas for the next several years. Van Ark played Valene in Knots Landing for thirteen of its fourteen seasons, which made her one of the show's longest running stars. The character made her last Knots Landing appearance in 1997, when she appeared in the reunion miniseries Knots Landing: Back to the Cul-de-Sac. In 2013, Van Ark reprised her character for the sequel version of Dallas.

Valene's storyline in her first two episodes on Dallas focuses on the rebuilding of her relationship with estranged ex-husband Gary Ewing. When Valene arrives in Texas to find her daughter, Lucy Ewing, she is brought back into the drama of the Ewing family. Upon arrival, she is reunited with Gary with whom she slowly falls back in love. Once Dallas became a hit, series creator David Jacobs proceeded to launch a spin-off series titled Knots Landing, which would feature Valene and Gary prominently. The actress had strong input on how they would create her character outline. She recalled, "I remember going to wardrobe and getting a peachy pink waitress uniform, and the shoes. And then I was trying to get that Texas sound, her all important accent. And so we created her layer by layer."

Van Ark received positive reviews for her portrayal of Valene, and received two Soap Opera Digest award nominations in the category "Outstanding Actress in a Leading Role on a Prime Time Serial". Greg Hernandez said, "Her character of Valene was a best-selling author, but her personal life was always a mess. She had her husband, Gary, stolen by another woman, then got pregnant by him, her twin babies were kidnapped by a crooked doctor, she was given a drug overdose at gunpoint by her ex-husband's fiancee, and she racked up enough marriages to give Elizabeth Taylor a run for her money. But she and Gary Ewing (Ted Shackelford) made for one of television's most beloved couples and the audience never stopped rooting for them to get back together."

== Development ==
=== Casting and creation ===
From the outset, Dallas was centered around the lives of the wealthy Ewing family who lived in Dallas, Texas. Once the show became a success after the initial run as a five-episode miniseries, the producers decided to expand the roles of certain characters. They introduced the parents of Lucy Ewing (Charlene Tilton), who had not been shown until that point. Actress Joan Van Ark was contacted by series creator David Jacobs about joining the show. Her husband, John Marshall, convinced her to take the opportunity. In an interview for an episode of Celebrity Weddings, Van Ark said: "At the time Dallas came up, I was doing two different jobs. They offered me to join Dallas, which would be shot in Dallas, Texas at Southfork. I read the script and it was buzzed about already...they were saying this was the hot new show. I said to myself, 'How can I be in Los Angeles doing this, down in Dallas, and then back in New York doing two days worth of Estée Lauder commercials?' He (my husband) read it and said, 'You've got to. It's a wonderful part. So, my husband talked me into a role that would become a fifteen-year chapter in my life."

When asked about the casting process, Van Ark explained: "It all happened so fast. They sent me a script for a [Dallas] two-part guest shot, but I was supposed to be in New York recording commercials. My husband – much like Larry Hagman's wife, Maj, talked him into playing J.R. – basically talked me into playing Val." She later added, "I thought the script was wonderful, and [Valene] was a great character. But we created her within those two episodes. I remember going to wardrobe and getting a peachy pink waitress uniform, and the shoes. And then I was trying to get that Texas sound, her all important accent. And so we created her layer by layer." During the second season of Dallas, David Jacobs decided to create a spin-off for the quickly growing franchise. He wanted to create a television show based on "family issues and examining relationships at the middle class level". The production company, CBS, turned down this idea, as they wanted something more "glitzy" to put on the air, with wealthier characters, which would become Dallas.

After the success of Dallas, Jacobs' presented his initial idea again and created Knots Landing, with some alterations of his original script. In an interview, Jacobs explained: " Well, that's pretty good, but you know-and then he pulled out the pages that we'd left for them a few years ago on Knots Landing, or a year before on Knots, and he said, 'Is there any way we can make this a spin-off?' I just took one of the couples and made it, you know, Val and Gary who had already been created on the parent series and putting them into the mix, but when you have four couples and you change one, you sort of have to change the dynamic all the way around. However, once I wrote the script, remarkably little changed from the script and the pilot as you would see it." Gary Ewing was originally played by actor David Ackroyd, but Ackroyd was unable to sign on for the spin-off, and Ted Shackelford assumed the role. Initially, it was presumed that Charlene Tilton would be joining Knots Landing as Gary and Val's daughter, but the network decided to keep her on Dallas in order to keep the two shows separate. She did, however, make a guest appearance in the first season.

Van Ark appeared in Knots Landing for thirteen seasons of its fourteen-season run before she left to pursue other interests. According to co-star Michele Lee, Van Ark was apparently offered a role on an NBC sitcom after she left the show. The actress reprised her role for the series finale of Knots Landing, where Val is revealed to have been alive the whole time. When asked about her departure in an interview with the Los Angeles Times, she said:

"I could stay forever on the show and be safe. But three years ago I did Night of the Iguana in Williamstown [Massachusetts], and I had a quote from Tennessee Williams taped on my mirror, taken from an essay he'd written on success. It said, and I'm paraphrasing here: 'Security is in the shape of a kidney-shaped pool in Los Angeles, where you sit waiting for your residual checks.' I was in a comfortable spot on Knots, and an artist should not be comfortable. I'd forgotten that there was a character I'd loved for 13 years. She was the seed of the show. I am the sole person to spin off from Dallas (because actor David Ackroyd originated the role of Gary on that show). Valene gave Knots a note of spirituality. There was a heart that was Valene. I hope they treat her with respect, that she is seen out with a resolution she deserves."

=== Characterization and relationships ===
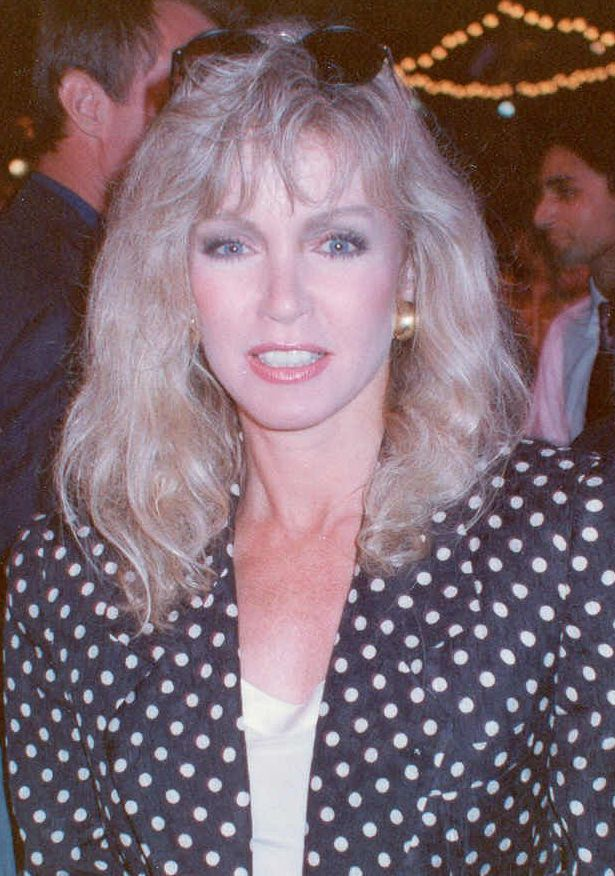
Donna Mills as Abby Cunningham, the primary villain of the show, who seduces Gary Ewing from Val.

Throughout the course of the show, Val was often played up as the good girl character. When asked about whether Val was a weak character, Van Ark said: "God, no. No she wasn't. For the very reason that she went through so much and landed on both feet. She was strong in a realistic kind of way. I do remember that TV Guide did a quote that the three of us can be compared to Earth, Wind and Fire. Michele was the Earth, I was the Wind and Donna was the Fire. I think that really captured it." Van Ark was later asked about who she saw Val as today. She said, "Of course the dysfunctional elements would come out. Why even bother otherwise? But of course they would persevere and still be together after all. I think Valene was headed to, and my sister's like this, after years of doing everything for her husband and her children, Valene was going to further her achievements in the professional world. I think if you saw Valene today she'd be much more accomplished as a writer and would be very successful overall." The actress also said:

Since Valene, I've tried to do anything and everything but play a goody-two-shoes. I love Val, I adore her. But I spent a total of 15 years—if you count the first year I played her on Dallas. That was quite an investment for me as an actress. If you were playing a goody-two-shoes today, the tabloid media would be dying to catch you on a bad day. Look at what they've done to Tiger Woods. Look at what they've done to that man. My feeling is his father—or the absence of his father in his life—is (the root of) what's going on with Tiger and that marriage. But the media won't leave him alone. No matter who you are, (the celebrity coverage) is obsessive and constant. It's hurtful. For me, if they show my face in a bad photo, they latch into me hook, line and sinker. Even Entertainment Tonight now has blood on their hands. It's brutal. I wonder what they'll do with Alec Baldwin now. He was my brother on Knots. They really threw him under a bus (when endlessly publicizing his infamous voice-mail rant against daughter Ireland, then 11, in 2007). He loves that child so much."

Valene's relationship with Gary is important to the understanding of her overall character. The Gary/Abby/Valene love triangle, which involved Gary cheating on Valene with Abby Cunningham – the show's main villain – was a monumental storyline for all three characters. Van Ark described the storyline:

"There wasn't really anything I could think of, but I will mention that Ted and I went in way early, whenever Donna Mills came on the show, and told David Jacobs that it made total sense that Gary would fall for Abby. I can't believe I did that but it really provided me with some great stories. Because they were celebrating Donna Mills and she became the center but Gary and Val were supposed to be this enduring couple. Ted and I were saying Gary and Val should break up and Gary should go with Abby. It was a pretty big deal to break up the couple that the show began with. So (the producers) were going toward this, then they pulled away but eventually returned to it. David Jacobs was against it but we convinced him. And it was the longest running story on the show. It took a long time for them to get back together. Eight years."

Ted Shackelford, who plays Gary, described the love story, "I can't complain. I mean, Gary spent six or seven years being led down the primrose path by one stupid broad after another. So with Val... You'd think after 13 years, at the age they are [Val is 45, Gary is 47] and the amount of bullshit they've been through, they would have learned something! They'd probably have a very comfortable life by now. But it makes for a dead story line." When asked about working with Van Ark, he said: "I don't know how it could get any better. She's remarkable, and I'm not blowing smoke up your ass. I'd tell you if I thought she was a pain in the ass, although sometimes she is a pain in the ass. But my best work is done with Joan." Van Ark also discussed Valene's relationship with her daughter, Lucy Ewing. She said, "The spine or the beginning of the series was Gary and Val, coming over from Dallas, so maybe there should have been more Lucy. I do know that CBS and the producers of both shows wanted to keep the two shows separate but in the beginning you had Larry Hagman and others going over to Knots."

== Return ==
With the 2012 continuation of Dallas, there was talk of some Knots Landing characters returning to air. Rumors began surfacing that both Van Ark and Shackelford would reprise their roles as Valene and Gary. Ted Shackelford passed on the small role the producers offered him to reprise his role as Gary Ewing on the new series. Van Ark refuted the claims, saying: "Well, rumor has it… I'm having lunch with Ted tomorrow. They asked him to come down and be part of it. It was several months ago, and he's deeply into filming The Young and the Restless, the daytime soap for CBS. But if they asked Gary, maybe they'll ask [for Val]." She would, however, love to be involved if the producers asked her, especially to torment fellow cast-member Larry Hagman. "There is no doubt about it. This man I loved so much, Larry Hagman… I was just at his birthday party several months ago… I would kill, that if Val came back, if it was trouble for J.R.. Because they were always at odds." However, Gary and Valene's daughter, Lucy Ewing, along with Ray Krebbs have made appearances in the new series. Although both Shackelford and Van Ark appeared in the 1991 series finale of Dallas playing "alternative" versions of Gary and Valene (the episode depicted a fantasy world in which J.R. had never been born), there have been no real crossovers of story or characters from Knots Landing to Dallas or vice versa since the 1985–86 season of each show (which, on Dallas, turned out to be a dream had by Pamela Ewing).

On October 17, 2012, TV Guide reported that Van Ark and Ted Shackelford were set to appear in Dallas, reprising their characters in the show's second season, which aired in 2013. Shackelford appeared in three episodes, and Van Ark in one.

== Character arc ==
=== Dallas ===
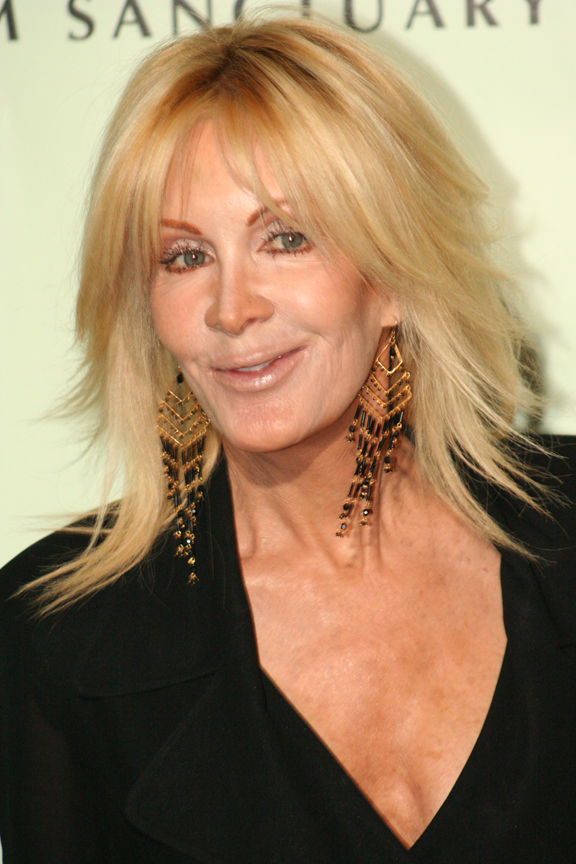
Valene's (Joan Van Ark, pictured in present day) storylines primarily revolved around her romantic relationship with Gary Ewing, the love of her life, with other characters often added internal conflict.

Valene Ewing first appears in Dallas in 1978, as the mother of Lucy Ewing (Charlene Tilton) and the ex-wife of Gary Ewing (David Ackroyd, later played by Ted Shackelford), the middle son and the black sheep of the Ewing family. Valene and Gary Ewing were first married in their adolescence in 1960, when Gary was 17 years old and Valene was 15. When a pregnant Valene persuades Gary to take her to the Southfork Ranch in order to introduce her to his family, they settle down at Southfork, and Miss Ellie (Barbara Bel Geddes) gave Gary a job as ranch foreman. However, Gary and Valene were soon pressured and manipulated by Gary's older brother, J.R. (Larry Hagman), who constantly tried to undermine and destroy their marriage. Gary's father Jock (Jim Davis) liked Valene and was excited to become a grandfather, but put pressure on Gary to stand up and face his responsibilities for becoming a teenage husband and father-to-be. When Valene gives birth to Lucy, J.R. makes it clear that the child is a Ewing and will be raised by the Ewings themselves. J.R.'s constant interference causes Gary and Val's marriage to collapse. Under the pressure, Gary fell victim to alcoholism, became violent in the process and walked out on Val and Lucy. With Gary gone, Valene is then driven off Southfork by J.R., but she soon returns to get baby Lucy and flees to Virginia, and later to her home state of Tennessee, where she tries to get help from her mother, Lilimae Clements (Julie Harris), to take them in, but they are turned away. At this point, Valene and Lucy had already been tracked down by heavies that were hired by J.R. and the heavies rip Lucy right out of Valene's arms, and take Lucy back to Southfork to be raised by her paternal grandparents. When Valene later tried to take legal action to get Lucy back, J.R. warned Valene that he'd kill her if she came back to Texas. Valene is prevented from seeing her daughter again for many years as a result of this.

Valene's bitterness over her mother's indifference, and the subsequent loss of Lucy is not resolved until 1980, shortly after she and Gary had moved to Knots Landing, when Lilimae shows up unannounced. After a tense reunion, she eventually makes peace with Val. Much of Valene's early backstory is told through flashbacks in episodes of Knots Landing, and is only briefly referenced in Dallas.

While working in a diner in 1978, Valene decided to wait for Lucy outside her school and they got to know each other. They stayed in contact with each other in secret for several months afterward. In the fall of 1978, Lucy arranges a reunion for her parents. Gary and Valene move back to Southfork for a short time, but their reunion is again undermined by J.R., who arranged for Gary to take charge of a failing company, hoping that the pressure would drive Gary away. Gary realized that he would fall off the wagon unless he left Southfork, so he departed. J.R. then turned on Valene, trying to bribe her to leave (but Bobby and Lucy overhear J.R. and Valene's exchange and Lucy realizes that it was J.R. who was responsible for her estrangement from her mother, and that Valene didn't abandon her voluntarily). In December 1979, Valene and Gary are reunited once more in Dallas, and get married for the second time. Jock and Miss Ellie attend the wedding, as do Gary's brother Bobby (Patrick Duffy) and sister-in-law Pamela Barnes Ewing (Victoria Principal). Shortly afterward, they move to California, to live in a home that Miss Ellie had bought for them as a wedding gift.

Valene also appears in the final episode of Dallas during J.R.'s dream, which showed how things would have turned out had J.R. never existed. In this dream, Val meets Gary for the first time when they are both middle aged and they take a liking to each other, highlighting the idea that Gary and Val were always destined to end up together one way or another.

=== Knots Landing ===
After their remarriage, Gary and Valene move to Knots Landing, a coastal suburb of Los Angeles, California. Valene is initially skeptical of the move, and describes Knots Landing as "no place to start over". She is struck by her neighbors, the Fairgates, and particularly by Sid's daughter, Annie, from Sid's first marriage, who reminds Val of her own daughter, Lucy. Gary is determined to stay and convinces Val to give Knots Landing a chance. Val becomes involved in John B. Anderson's Independent 1980 presidential election effort, joining the local chapter of the Anderson-Lucey '80 campaign. She also signs up neighbor Karen Fairgate (Michele Lee) and the pair eventually become best friends, a relationship struck when Annie, on the run, turns to Val for help, and Val convinces her to return to her father and stepmother. Val remained a central character on the show from 1979 to 1992. Gary and Val's daughter, Lucy, visits her parents in Knots Landing and appears in one episode in the show's first season. Though largely uneducated, Valene discovers she has a talent for writing and writes a thinly veiled exposé of the Ewings of Dallas called "Capricorn Crude". Gary is extremely critical of the book, which affects their marriage. However, the book is published and Val becomes a best-selling novelist and financially independent. Val leaves Gary after Gary's affair with his neighbor and business partner, Abby Cunningham (Donna Mills); and Val keeps the house in Seaview Circle. Gary and Val's second marriage ended in divorce nearly a year later. Val is subsequently married to Ben Gibson (Doug Sheehan) (1985–1987), and later briefly to Danny Waleska (Sam Behrens) (1990).

One of Val's most memorable storylines occurs during the 1984–85 season when she is told that her infant twins are stillborn. Val senses that this could not be true as she clearly remembers hearing the babies cry. She suffers a nervous breakdown and disappears from Knots Landing for several months, and is later reunited with her babies, thanks largely to the investigations secretly undertaken by her neighbors Mack and Karen MacKenzie. During this storyline, Valene's home town is revealed as Shula, Tennessee (a fictional community in real-life Johnson County). In 1991, over 8 years after their second divorce, Gary and Val got married for the third time (Valene's fifth marriage, and Gary's fourth). While working on an assignment to write a biography about Greg Sumner (William Devane) in 1992, Valene crosses paths with some mafioso type characters who are targeting Sumner. Fearing that she could expose them, they kidnap Val and she is later believed to have died in a car accident. Joan Van Ark had decided to leave the series in 1992, at the end of Season 13, which turned out to be the show's penultimate season. However, Van Ark came back in the 2-part finale to the show's final season in 1993, when it was discovered that Val was never in the car. Having escaped her kidnappers, she later returns to the cul-de-sac. Valene is seen once again in the 1997 reunion mini-series Knots Landing: Back to the Cul-de-Sac where she begins a new career as a screenwriter and adapts her best-selling novel "Hostage", which tells the story of her kidnapping five years earlier, into a film.

=== Dallas (2012 TV series) ===
In 2013, it transpires Gary and Valene have separated again due to Gary falling off the wagon. Sue Ellen Ewing (Linda Gray) calls Val on behalf of Gary, to tell her that Gary misses her. Val shows up at Southfork with her daughter Lucy, where she is met with a frosty reception from Gary. Val realizes she has returned to Dallas under false pretences and confronts Sue Ellen, who tells her to work things out with Gary while she still has the chance. Eventually, Gary and Valene return to their home in California together.

== Reception ==
For her portrayal of Valene, Van Ark received two Soap Opera Digest awards in the category "Outstanding Actress in a Leading Role on a Prime Time Serial". Greg Hernandez said, "Before I go on, I have to confess that I was a die-hard fan of Knots Landing, the series on which Joan played sweet Valene Ewing for 14 years. Her character of Valene was a best-selling author but her personal life was always a mess. She had her husband, Gary, stolen by another woman then got pregnant by him, her twin babies were kidnapped by a crooked doctor, she was given a drug overdose at gunpoint by her ex-husband's fiancee, and she racked up enough marriages to give Elizabeth Taylor a run for her money. But she and Gary Ewing (Ted Shackelford) made for one of television's most beloved couples and the audience never stopped rooting for them to get back together. Joan keeps in touch with Ted, Michelle Lee – who played her best friend Karen – and the great stage star Julie Harris who played her mother." Knots Landing itself has experienced a tremendous fan following and dedication. Van Ark said of this, "It's amazing. It's like having friends everywhere in the United States. I heard that a group a fans from London were coming in just to see us at this (autograph convention). We get a lot of fan mail from Europe – France, Germany, Russia. Knots has a huge following, and I think fans of the show are loving and loyal. Not many shows last 14 years on prime-time. That's a milestone, and I'm very proud of it."

The Chicago Sun-Times said, "Valene Ewing Gibson would be the first to admit that the past seven years have been no day at the beach. She lost her first husband to a sultry siren who applies eyeliner with a trowel. She opened her heart and her home to a nagging mother who could drive Mother Teresa to slit her wrists. She discovered a long-lost brother who just happened to be a psychotic TV evangelist. She even had a nervous breakdown that left her convinced her name was Verna, and was an 'I do' away from tying the knot with a scheming sleazeball who was well aware of her family ties to the Ewings of Dallas even if she had forgotten."
