= Karen MacKenzie =

- Knots Landing character
- Michele Lee as Karen Fairgate-MacKenzie
- Portrayed by: Michele Lee; Liane Curtis (flashbacks)
- Duration: 1979–93, 1997
- First appearance: December 27, 1979 "Pilot"
- Last appearance: May 9, 1997; Back to the Cul-de-Sac
- Created by: David Jacobs
In-universe information
- Occupation: Partner in a construction company Former Host of Open Mike; Former Member of the Environmental Board; Former Partner in Lotus Point; Former Owner of Knots Landing Motors; Former Community organizer
- Mother: Dorothy Cooper
- Brothers: Joe Cooper
- Husband: Sid Fairgate (until 1981); Mack MacKenzie (1983–)
- Sons: Eric Fairgate; Michael Fairgate
- Daughters: Diana Fairgate
- Adoptive sons: Jason Lochner (foster)
- Adoptive daughters: Meg MacKenzie
- Stepdaughters: Annie Fairgate; Paige Matheson
- Grandchildren: Unnamed grandchild (through Michael)

Karen MacKenzie (née Cooper; formerly Fairgate) is a fictional character in the CBS primetime soap opera Knots Landing. Karen is portrayed by actress Michele Lee, and has appeared on the show since its pilot episode, first broadcast on December 27, 1979. Knots Landing follows the trials of four middle-class families living on a suburban cul-de-sac known as Seaview Circle in California. Lee portrayed Karen for the entire run of Knots Landing, being the sole cast member to appear in every episode of its fourteen seasons. At the time, her appearances in all 344 episodes set a record for an actress on American primetime television. Karen's storylines focus on family troubles, business dealings, addiction, and kidnapping.

Series creator David Jacobs said "Karen is the tent pole. She says the things I want to say. She's the voice of the viewer." Entertainment Weekly also described Karen as being "efficient, kind, and understanding". During the course of her existence on the program, she was married to both Sid Fairgate (Don Murray) and second husband Mack MacKenzie (Kevin Dobson). Many other characters would try to undermine her relationship with Mack, such as his daughter Paige Matheson (Nicollette Sheridan), and former love interest Anne Matheson (Michelle Phillips), though Karen came to accept Paige as his daughter later on.

Due to her long-running tenure, television personality Joan Rivers commented that Lee was, in theory, the "First Lady of Knots Landing" during her guest appearance on The Late Show, which Rivers hosted at the time. The characters of the series often represented what was happening in society at the time, which Lee acknowledged by saying: "Karen wanted to be a Pollyanna and wasn't ashamed of that. Remember in our society, maybe people don't remember, but remember when we could go over to other people's houses and come in through an open back door? I remember when I was a little girl and my mother and father would have people over and they'd walk into an unlocked door in our house."

== Development ==
=== Creation and casting ===
Prior to being cast in Knots Landing, Michele Lee had made a slew of film and television appearances. Lee holds the sole record for appearing in all 344 episodes of the dramatic series, setting a record at the time for a female actress in primetime television history. (S. Epatha Merkerson, who portrayed character Anita Van Buren on the crime drama Law & Order, surpassed Lee's record in 2008.) After the success of Dallas, David Jacobs' presented his initial idea again and created Knots Landing, with some alterations of his original script. In an interview, Jacobs explained: "Well, that's pretty good, but you know-and then he pulled out the pages that we'd left for them a few years ago on the show, or a year before on Knots, and he said, 'Is there any way we can make this a spin-off?' I just took one of the couples and made it, you know, Val and Gary who had already been created on the parent series and putting them into the mix, but when you have four couples and you change one, you sort of have to change the dynamic all the way around. However, once I wrote the script, remarkably little changed from the script and the pilot as you would see it."

=== Characterization ===
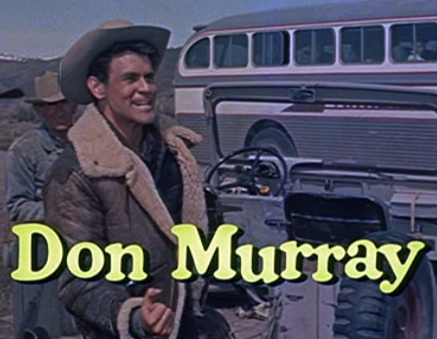
Actor Don Murray portrayed Lee's on-screen husband for the first two seasons of Knots.

Entertainment Weekly has said of Lee's character, "Her character, Karen MacKenzie, is efficient, kind, and understanding. Today, she's headed for big trouble, but Karen, onetime widow, single mom, addict, kidnappee, shooting victim, talk show hostess, and target of a psychotic fan, is resilient. Some on Knots say the show could not survive the loss of its moral mouthpiece." In 1991, the actress herself also commented, "Karen has gone through so much that it's hard to get her a [new] story line. Although she may be the only character who doesn't need a story line. She's a rock. She helps solve the problems. Certainly, after 12 years of playing Karen, you think, 'Oh, God, I wish I could play the town slut. But I have to save those roles for my hiatus."

Jacobs also said, "Karen, Michele Lee's character, was - made the speeches that I would have made about subjects, so she sort of was my footprint. . .but she was different. And also, I never had to - I never had a problem hearing Karen, you know. She and I spoke the same way." The character evolved significantly from the beginning of the series to the end. In the beginning, Karen was somewhat of a "bad girl" in order to lure over some fans of J.R. Ewing from Dallas. He noted:

"Well, Karen in the beginning was limited by her - well, we made Karen a little bit harsher in the first season than we otherwise would have because we were toying with the audience. And because it was a Dallas spin-off, the natural question was always, 'Well, where's your JR? Who's your JR?' And so, even though Michele Lee herself is a very likeable person, and even if she's being over the top she's a person of great enthusiasm, she's a person of great strength, in the pilot anyway, we were sort of pushing the possibility that she was gonna be roughly our equivalent. I always wanted to project the idea that we weren't Dallas, it was a different scale from Dallas, that whoever we had wasn't gonna be as successful as JR. But later on, the line "being married to a saint" was - Don Murray was so sweet, you know, and so rational all the time that, um, her enthusiasm, or the size of her enthusiasm, sometimes grew shrill and - I don't remember the context in which she said,'It's difficult being married to a saint" - but it's true, Sid had - you know, even the way he ran his business was totally moral. He was a totally moral kind of guy. Then later on, when Kevin makes the comment to her, it's really about her - um - if I recall, it's really about her correctness, you know, her dedication to her issues."

Though she was often a maternal figure, Karen was never able to become a grandmother on the serial. Lee said on her personal website, "Yes. I know it might sound like a big ego...far from it. It was a business option to prolong a career."

=== Impact on society ===
When often interviewed about the show, Lee brings up the fact that "as society changed...so did Knots Landing." Her character once gave a memorable speech about how society was often changing and becoming less of the trustworthy place it used to be. Karen became addicted to prescription medication, a key plotline for her character in the fifth season. Lee said, "Karen's addiction, at a time when we as a nation were examining our culture and addiction problems. It was powerful because of the knowledge that addiction could come to anyone, including a First Lady and Karen Mackenzie." In an interview with the official Knots Landing website, the actress said: "Oh! Let me add to that last question by also mentioning the Pollyanna speech as one of my favorite moments as Karen. The Pollyanna speech was a testimony to our writers keeping our fingers on the pulse of what (the audience) was feeling in their own lives. If we were doing the show today I could give the Pollyanna speech and add a few more items." She went further into detail by saying:

"I think Karen was very assertive in that statement. I hope there's a Pollyanna in all of us and that part doesn't ever die. I still have that part in me. I think what was interesting about that speech was that we weren't used to hearing our characters that impassioned. Karen showed the frustrations we were having with our society. There are two things to consider with that speech - the issue of Karen being called a Pollyanna and whether Karen actually was a Pollyanna. Karen wanted to be a Pollyanna and wasn't ashamed of that. Remember in our society, maybe people don't remember, but remember when we could go over to other people's houses and come in through an open back door? I remember when I was a little girl and my mother and father would have people over and they'd walk into an unlocked door in our house. Maybe apropos Knots Landing would have been Val opening the back door and Karen saying (simulates Karen calling from another room), 'Hi Val, come on in!' That would never happen now."

== Storylines ==
Years before the series begins, Karen Cooper moves to Philadelphia to study, where she meets and falls in love with young mechanic Sid Fairgate (Don Murray), who lives with his wife, Susan (Claudette Nevins) and their daughter, Annie (Karen Allen). When Sid divorces Susan, he marries Karen and they move to Knots Landing, California where they live with their three children Diana (Claudia Lonow), Eric (Steve Shaw) and Michael Fairgate (Patrick Petersen). Karen gets along with everybody in the neighborhood, except for her sister-in-law, Abby Cunningham (Donna Mills), who joins the show in its second season. She always sees through her conniving, manipulative persona, much to the dismay of Sid. However, it is Valene Ewing (Joan Van Ark), her next door neighbor, who soon becomes her closest and dearest friend. In 1981, Sid's brakes are messed with and his car plunges off the side of a cliff. When Sid dies shortly after, Karen takes over the running of Knots Landing Motors. When Sid's killers are released in 1982, she goes to see Federal Prosecutor Mack MacKenzie (Kevin Dobson) in order to get help to bring them to justice. They achieve this, and she and Mack fall in love and they elope to Las Vegas and are married in early 1983. Karen soon gets hooked on prescription pills when her daughter, Diana, runs off and marries murderer Chip Roberts (Michael Sabatino). When Chip accidentally dies, Diana goes to live with her aunt Abby and Abby's husband Gary Ewing (Ted Shackelford) at their ranch, thus increasing Karen's dependency on pills. When Mack finds her unconscious in the bathroom, she is admitted to hospital to recuperate.

Karen decides to divorce Mack when she discovers he is still tracking down the Wolfbridge Group, a dangerous crime organization. Karen's children frantically try to get her to change her mind from divorcing Mack and she eventually forgives him as she is still in love with him. However, Karen is accidentally shot by the Wolfbridge Group in the fifth-season finale. She survives but ends up having a risky operation to remove the bullet which was lodged in a precarious position which may leave her paralysed. After recovering, she goes to work at the Lotus Point resort when Gary makes her an equal partner (Lotus Point was built on land that Sid and Abby's uncle left to them, and Karen inherited Sid's half as his widow). Once there, Karen insists on making Lotus Point as environmentally friendly as possible, refusing to compromise her principles purely for profit. In 1986, an old friend of Mack's, Phil Harbert (Louis Giambalvo), kidnaps Karen as he is seeking revenge for Mack testifying against him years ago. However, she escapes and is soon reunited with Mack.

When her friend Laura (Constance McCashin) dies in 1987, she leaves behind her forlorn husband, Greg Sumner (William Devane) and their baby daughter, Meg. When Karen realizes that Greg is grieving and is having a tough time coping without Laura, Greg gives Meg to Karen and Mack to bring up as their own child. While running Lotus Point with her fellow partners, Karen fights Manny Vasquez (John Aprea), who tries to use the resort's marina to transport drugs. Lotus Point then becomes a focus of bad news because of the drug bust and is later sold to a Japanese firm, which is secretly headed by her former sister-in-law Abby who has actually discovered there is oil beneath the resort. However, her scheme is thwarted by Karen and Abby is forced to donate Lotus Point to the state as a public park in order to escape prosecution for fraud.

Later on, Karen goes to work as a presenter on the TV show "Open Mike", and subsequently becomes a victim of harassment by the show's assistant producer, Jeff Cameron (Chris Lemmon). Soon after starting work there, she receives nasty packages which include an animals heart and a box of flowers which contain snakes. In 1992, Karen and Mack are given one-third interest in the Sumner Group corporation by Greg Sumner, to be run in trust for his daughter Meg. Karen and Mack separate once again when they battle to keep Meg after Mary Robeson (Maree Cheatham) arrives claiming to be Meg's biological grandmother through Laura. Karen takes Meg and goes to stay with her daughter Diana in New York, but reconciles with Mack when he comes to visit them and they return home to their home in Knots Landing.

In the 1997 reunion mini-series Knots Landing: Back to the Cul-de-Sac, Karen and Mack celebrate their 15th wedding anniversary. Now in business with Gary Ewing again, Karen is co-owner of a construction business.

== Reception ==
Jamey Giddens of Pop Confidential praised Lee, saying "I can't remember a more comforting primetime presence than Lee, as Seaview Circle's courageous heroine Karen Fairgate MacKenzie. For 14 seasons, Lee's Karen was the glue that held Knots together. Amid dead husbands, nubile, surprise stepdaughters, snatched up baby twins, philandering neighbors and one hoeish sister-in-law, you could always count on Karen!"
