= Abby Cunningham =

Fictional character from the soap opera Knots Landing

- Knots Landing character
- Portrayed by: Donna Mills; Cynthia Bain (flashbacks)
- Duration: 1980–89, 1993, 1997
- First appearance: November 20, 1980 (Episode: Hitchhike, Part 1)
- Last appearance: May 9, 1997 (Knots Landing: Back to the Cul-de-Sac)
- Created by: David Jacobs
In-universe information
- Other names: Abby Cunningham; Abby Ewing; Abby Sumner
- Occupation: Bookkeeper at Knots Landing Motors. Executive at: Gary Ewing Enterprises; Apolune; Lotus Point; Morikame; Sumner Group; Treadwell Industries; Member of the California Planning Commission Board. U.S. Trade Representative to Japan.
- Parents: William Fairgate
- Siblings: Sid Fairgate; Philip Fairgate
- Spouse: Jeff Cunningham (until 1980); Gary Ewing (1983–87); Charles Scott (1988) (annulled); Greg Sumner (1989)
- Children: Olivia Cunningham Dyer; Brian Cunningham
- Stepchildren: Lucy Ewing; Bobby Ewing II. Betsy Ewing; Mary-Frances Sumner; Marguerite Katherine Sumner (briefly until her adoption)
- Grandchildren: Unnamed grandchild (through Brian)
- Aunts and uncles: Roger Fairgate
- Nieces and nephews: Annie Fairgate; Diana Fairgate Roberts; Eric Fairgate; Michael Fairgate; Paul Fairgate

Abby Fairgate (formerly Cunningham, Ewing and Sumner) is a fictional character from the CBS prime time soap opera Knots Landing, a long-running serial about middle class life on the fictional cul-de-sac known as Seaview Circle in Los Angeles, California. She was played by Donna Mills between 1980 and 1989. Abby was created by producer David Jacobs as one of Knots Landing's earliest characters. She debuted in the first episode of the second season. Mills remained a principal actor in the series until she left in its tenth season. She returned for the two-part series finale in 1993, and made her last appearance in 1997 when she appeared in the reunion miniseries Knots Landing: Back to the Cul-de-Sac.

Prior to being cast on Knots Landing, Mills was predominantly known for playing "damsel in distress" roles, which is why the producers didn't initially consider her. Abby's storylines focused on business dealings, affairs and family troubles. Introduced as the sister of Sid Fairgate, she was initially portrayed as a friendly, warm-hearted woman with great love for her children. In due time, she evolved into the series' main antagonist, constantly causing mayhem in others' lives. According to series creator David Jacobs, the producers always intended Abby to be a J. R. Ewing-esque character. Jacobs said, "When we were casting the role of Abby, we were looking for a homey type, someone whom the other women characters would trust. It was our intention to have this nice person gain the trust of the other women and then cause trouble for them. We didn't want the other characters and the audience to know that there was a scheming person under this nice facade. We wanted her to come on as a good person and then evolve into a vixen."

The character became known for her manipulative behavior and was often labeled a "soap vixen". She was praised by television critics, with Carolyn McGuire of the Chicago Tribune saying: "Whoever shows up as the next villain, chances are his or her work won't be easy. That's because at least one resident—Abby Ewing—knows how to dish nasty with the best of them." When asked which character he wished he had created, Mike Kelley, the creator of ABC's popular prime time soap opera Revenge, said: "Abby Ewing. Donna Mills, you rocked my world." John Mapes of The Biography Channel said, "Any great soap opera needs a great villain. While viewers may identify more with the protagonist, the villains in a serial drama always spice things up, cause trouble, and make it more fun to watch."

== Development ==
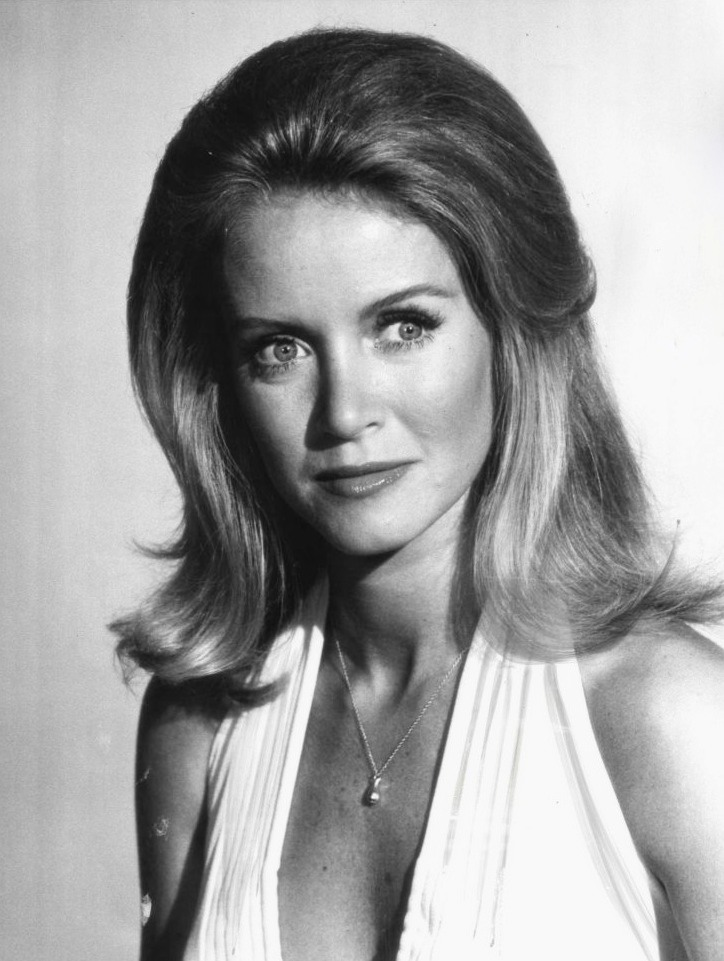
Donna Mills auditioned for Knots Landing during the early planning stages of the show's second season.

=== Casting and creation ===
Mills portrayed Abby from 1980 to 1989. Prior to being cast in Knots Landing, Mills was primarily known for playing the "damsel in distress" archetype in both film and television media. The actress became somewhat famous for playing these roles, often leading to unwanted typecasting. In an interview with Jerry Buck for the Toledo Blade, Mills said: "I got tired of playing the victim. It's a more active role. Abby keeps things stirred up, and I like that." According to Jacobs, Abby was not planned when the show began. He knew that he wanted a female J. R. Ewing-esque character. However, he had a different sense of the character and who would wind up in the role. With Mills' reputation of playing the victim, he initially didn't choose her for the part.

In the early planning stages of season two, CBS executive Tony Barch suggested Mills for the role of Abby Cunningham. The character was initially conceived as the sister of Sid Fairgate (Don Murray), one of the central characters on the show, who was killed off in the next season. Casting agent Barbara Miller-Gidaly introduced Mills and Jacobs. After meeting with Miller-Gidaly, Jacobs decided to have Mills test for the role, which was unusual for an established actress. She auditioned shortly after and convinced the producers that she was the right person for the part. Jacobs said, "She came back that afternoon and she read and she was great, and it meant reshaping the role a little bit, but, um, not that much. You know, she still came in, she drove up in the Volvo station wagon. She had the kids in the back. It was very middle class."

In 1989, Mills announced her intention to leave the long-running nighttime soap after nine years as Abby. According to Mills, she wanted to take a break from acting for a while, and from Abby as well. In an interview with The Cedartown Standard, Mills explained: "I'm tired of the show. It's been too long. I'm not particularly happy with the way they've been writing Abby lately. She's too soft. I'd like Abby to get back to her old self." Mills returned for the series finale and the subsequent reunion specials (Knots Landing: Back to the Cul-de-Sac and Knots Landing Reunion: Together Again). Virginia Heffernan of The New York Times praised her scenes with fellow actor William Devane, saying: "The Jean Naté-scented banter between the actors Donna Mills and William Devane is both the daffiest and the most enlightening part of the reunion special."

=== Characterization ===
I always planned her, because it was technically a spin off from Dallas everybody expected there to be a JR so I wanted to make sure there wasn't a JR. So I brought in Abby and her two children and so she was to become the villain but she was a great addition to the show. My initial thought was that it would be scenes of a marriage times four, but it became a dramatic exploration of the way people related in the post sexual revolution world and how they kept their marriages together if they could, what the relationships meant to them. To Abby it was currency, sex equaled currency, that's how she got money.

— David Jacobs on Abby

The producers always intended Abby to be the "pot stirrer". Devane, who played Greg Sumner, said that the show was looking for a woman "in high heels with the throat of the guy – that's what they wanted". He added, "It was your character that influenced all these unhappy women today who have jobs and are out there working hard, trying to raise kids by themselves, going crazy." Mark Harris of Entertainment Weekly said, "Michelle Phillips is the last of prime-time's great schemers, an essential element of the show since the departure of Donna Mills, whose Abby Cunningham was Knots' resident harpy for years."

In an interview with Greg Hernandez, Mills explained: "I knew that she was going to be a trouble maker but actually knowing the writers and the producers, I knew that the character would be rounded and have dimension and that was really fun for me to play. It wasn’t one-note all the time, it was a lot of different colors." Television personality Julie Chen said, "The women of Knots, Michele Lee, Joan Van Ark, and Donna Mills have been compared to earth, wind, and fire, with Donna Mills bringing the heat as Abby, the conniving vixen that everybody loved to hate." According to Mills, many people were wary of meeting her in person because they assumed she would be like Abby. She said, "They were very trepedacious about what I was going to do." Mike Celizic of NBC said that her character was "the archetypal predatory female", while Meredith Vieira said "even the bad girl could show a tender side every once in a while", in reference to her daughter's on-screen drug addiction. It was this very storyline that showed Abby at her most vulnerable and human, a story which audiences recall as perhaps one of her most desperate and motherly of moments. In addition to that, Abby also helped Val get her kidnapped babies back, even though she was blamed she said she "could never do a thing like that to anyone". When Karen and Mack began to have some problems in their marriage and Karen distanced herself from Mack, Abby confronted Karen aggressively and told her she was wrong for doing so to him.

Mills became known for wearing a lot of eye makeup in her scenes, to the point where it became a major character trait for her fictional personality. Carole Glinez of Star magazine said, "Mills was so famous for her dramatic eye makeup on the show that she produced her own beauty video called The Eyes Have It." Eddie Shapiro of Out magazine said that "Abby's eye makeup was legendary!" Glinez also referred to her as Knots "Fox", saying: "Mills was one of the queens of the nighttime soap. Abby Cunningham Ewing was the conniving, bed hopping blonde beauty on the Dallas spin-off Knots Landing."

=== Relationships ===
Abby was always intended to be the show's promiscuous seductress. In an interview with Carolyn McGuire of the Chicago Tribune, Jacobs said: "When we were casting the role of Abby, we were looking for a homey type, someone whom the other women characters would trust. It was our intention to have this nice person gain the trust of the other women and then cause trouble for them. We didn't want the other characters and the audience to know that there was a scheming person under this nice facade. We wanted her to come on as a good person and then evolve into a vixen." Author June L. May of Monsters and Critics said, "In season two of Knots Landing, a catalyst moves into the neighborhood in the form of Sid’s sister, the drop dead gorgeous Abby Cunningham. Whether Abby is directly involved, or simply in the neighborhood, she has a detrimental effect on the harmony of couples." Almost immediately, Abby sank her claws into Richard Avery (John Pleshette), one of the neighborhood husbands. Though the affair was brief, it set the stage for what was to come.

In season three, Abby sets her sights on the Gary Ewing, the husband of her good friend Valene Ewing. While Gary initially thwarted her attempts, he eventually gave in and had a full-fledged affair with her. Actress Joan Van Ark, who played Val, said: "I went in way early, whenever Donna Mills came on the show, and told David Jacobs that it made total sense that Gary would fall for Abby. Because they were celebrating Donna Mills and she became the center I can't believe I did that but it really provided us with some great stories. And it was the longest running story on the show." Dan Lewis of the Sarasota Journal said, "In a recent episode, Abby lures Gary Ewing into an affair, and sets it up so that his wife will discover it. After she completed the scene, Miss Mills recalls, the crew hissing at her – jokingly, of course." The character was known for her numerous rivalries with other female characters, such as Paige and Karen. Carole Glinez said, "Mills' character faced her rival Paige, played by future Desperate Housewives sexpot Nicollette Sheridan."

== Storylines ==
Years before her first appearance, Abby meets and marries Jeff Cunningham (Barry Jenner). They move to San Luis Obispo, California, and have two children, Olivia (Tonya Crowe) and Brian (Bobby Jacoby/Brian Austin Green). When she and Jeff divorce in 1980, Abby decides to move to San Diego. On the way she stops to visit her brother Sid (Don Murray), then decides to stay in Knots Landing. She rents a house on Seaview Circle through realtor Laura Avery (Constance McCashin), before starting an affair with Laura's husband Richard (John Pleshette). Abby soon sets her eyes on neighbor Gary Ewing (Ted Shackelford), which becomes obvious after she starts working as a bookkeeper for Knots Landing Motors. She and Gary get the company involved with the mob, which results in her brother Sid's death. At the same time, Jeff kidnaps her children. She eventually gets them back by tricking him into thinking she will reconcile with him. Abby and Gary go into a methanol business together and start an affair. When Gary's wife Valene (Joan Van Ark) finds out, she kicks Gary out and he moves in with Abby. Gary soon inherits millions after the death of his father, Jock Ewing (Jim Davis). Abby uses the money to manipulate those around her, and Gary starts drinking again. Gary sobers up and buys a ranch, similar to Southfork, the ranch his family owns. They move there and marry in 1983.

Abby takes an active interest in running Gary's company, and uses his money to secretly fund her own corporation, Apolune, which she uses to develop Lotus Point, an area of land she and sister-in-law Karen (Michele Lee) inherit after the death of Sid and Abby's uncle. She becomes involved with politician Greg Sumner (William Devane) and the sinister Wolfbridge group. When Gary finds out about her illegal dealings, he leaves her. After Abby is kidnapped by Wolfbridge, he takes her back, and makes Karen a full partner with them in Lotus Point, where they build an upscale resort. Abby soon finds out that Val is pregnant with Gary's twins. She expresses her displeasure to employee Scott Easton, who has Val's twins kidnapped at birth against Abby's knowledge. To avoid being held responsible, Abby works to find out where the twins are and helps to reunite them with Val. Around this time, Abby begins running a cable TV station, a subsidiary of Gary's. Meanwhile, Gary begins to invest in a new development called Empire Valley. Abby schemes her way to become a part of the project, which is actually a front for a top secret surveillance installation. After Gary discovers this, he blows it up then leaves Abby again. She attempts to get him back, but they divorce.

Abby and her children move to a new house, where her teenaged daughter Olivia develops a drug problem. After drug dealers assault Brian, Abby takes drastic action to get Olivia to kick her drug habit, which she does.

Abby soon starts an affair with Peter Hollister (Hunt Block) as a way to get information on Greg Sumner. When Peter is found stabbed to death, Abby assumes her daughter Olivia did it and buries his body under a newly constructed playground at Lotus Point. However, the body is discovered which places Abby in a vulnerable position. It becomes clear that Paige Mathison (Nicollette Sheridan) accidentally killed Peter, which makes Abby vow revenge for the trouble she caused her.

Charles Scott (Michael York), Abby's first love, returns. He is married, but he divorces his wife and asks Abby to marry him.Abby is in love again, but then finds out that Charles is the front for a group of thugs wanting to build a marina at Lotus Point for drug trafficking. Abby pretends to go along with the marriage and accepts a two million dollar wedding gift from Charles. After the ceremony she has the marriage annulled, but keeps the money. After this, Abby marries Greg Sumner, much to the chagrin of Paige who is in love with him. It isn't love, but rather a political marriage as Greg attempts to run for political office again. Abby secretly forms another company, Morikame, in order to buy Lotus Point when she discovers there are valuable oil reserves beneath the land. She successfully swindles her partners Gary and Karen out of their shares of Lotus Point only to be exposed. When her former partners find out and threaten to have her prosecuted for fraud, she donates Lotus Point to the government as a wildlife preserve to avoid prosecution. Abby goes after a political appointment that Greg wants, and leaves Knots Landing in 1989 to be a trade representative in Japan.

Years later, Abby joins forces with corrupt financier Nigel Treadwell, and tries to take over the Sumner Group in 1993, but her plan fails. She moves back into her old house on the cul-de-sac in the final scene of the series.

In the 1997 reunion mini-series, Abby sells her house and prepares to leave the cul-de-sac and move to Malibu. However, the IRS freezes her assets for non-payment of back taxes; she temporarily moves in with Karen and Mack, and gets a job from Gary at the construction company he runs with Karen. However, Abby's motives are to obtain a legal document from their company in order to help Greg Sumner, who is being sued. Should she obtain the document, Greg will pay her the $1 million she needs. Greg then informs her he no longer needs the document. Abby tries to infiltrate his other business dealings to her advantage. Instead of paying her off, Greg offers her a job overseeing one of his business operations in Thailand, which will make her rich again. Before departing, Abby learns that Brian's girlfriend (Kate Whittaker) is expecting their first child, thus making her a grandmother.

== Reception ==
=== Critical reception ===
Abby was well received by television critics. Carolyn McGuire of the Chicago Tribune commented, "Whoever shows up as the next villain, chances are his or her work won't be easy. That's because at least one resident—Abby Ewing—knows how to dish nasty with the best of them. Only Alexis Carrington Colby Dexter, played by Joan Collins on Dynasty, and Angela Channing, portrayed by Jane Wyman on Falcon Crest, rival Abby Ewing, played by Donna Mills, for best prime-time female villain." When asked which character he wished he had created, Mike Kelly, the creator of ABC's popular primetime soap Revenge, said: "Abby Ewing. Donna Mills, you rocked my world." Jamey Giddens of Zap2it said, "While I readily admit Alexis will go down in soap history as the most famous of the 80's primetime soap vixens, she was never truly my cup of detergent. I much preferred the more subdued, methodical villainy of characters like Abby Fairgate (Donna Mills), who slept her way through Seaview Circle, and to the top of Corporate California on Knots Landing. God I miss that damn Cul-de-Sac!"

Josh Mapes of The Biography Channel listed her in the category "10 Primetime Stars We Love to Hate". He said, "Any great soap opera needs a great villain. While viewers may identify more with the protagonist, the villains in a serial drama always spice things up, cause trouble, and make it more fun to watch. From tongue lashings to catfights, underhanded tricks to boldface lies, the characters we love to hate have each brought a fair share of great moments to primetime soaps. While Larry Hagman played the bad guy on Dallas, Donna Mills played bad girl on its spin-off, Knots Landing. Unapologetically going after what she wanted, Mills' character engaged in affairs with two of the husbands on the Knots Landing cul-de-sac. But, like most vixens on primetime soaps, she was only out for money, not love." Steve Eighinger of the Quincy Newspapers listed Abby as the third-most memorable TV character in an article he wrote for the Quincy Herald-Whig. He said, "No one, absolutely no one, rocked eye shadow and the messy-hair look like Abby Ewing, who was this marvelous combination of vixen and corporate sleuth. As her character developed, life on the cul-de-sac made Knots Landing destination TV every Thursday night for more than a decade."

Marta Hoelsher of Technorati Media said: "The biggest news of season two, though, is the appearance of Donna Mills as Abby Cunningham, the blonde bombshell who wreaks havoc all through the neighborhood. With the appearance of Abby, things really started to heat up and get interesting. No marriage is off limits when Abby sets her eyes on it. Played to perfection by Donna Mills, Abby is wicked, vicious, bitchy, and heartless enough to keep us loving and hating her for years. Abby's clashes with Karen MacKenzie and Val were legendary, and season two gets things rolling. After a fairly peaceful start to the season, we start to see the beginnings of the rivalry that defines the show for years: Karen vs. Abby. It's fun watching their early friendship evolve into a bitter rivalry."

=== Accolades ===
Group	Category	Year	Result
Soap Opera Digest Award	Outstanding Villainess: Prime Time	1989	Won
Soap Opera Digest Award	Outstanding Villainess: Prime Time	1988	Won
Soap Opera Digest Award	Outstanding Actress in a Leading Role on a Prime Time Serial	1986	Nominated
Soap Opera Digest Award	"Outstanding Villainess: Prime Time"	1986	Won
