= Knots Landing Reunion: Together Again =

- Main title screen
- Genre: Television special
- Written by: Stephen Pouliot
- Directed by: Michael Dempsey
- Starring: William Devane; Kevin Dobson; Lisa Hartman Black; Michele Lee; Donna Mills; Michelle Phillips; Ted Shackelford; Joan Van Ark; Alec Baldwin; Julie Harris; Don Murray; Nicolette Sheridan; David Jacobs; Michael Filerman
- Country of origin: United States
- Original language: English

Production
- Executive producers: Henry Winkler; Michael Levitt; David Jacobs; Michael Filerman
- Producer: Gary Tellalian
- Running time: 90 minutes
- Production companies: Henry Winkler/Michael Levitt Productions; Warner Bros. Television

Original release
- Network: CBS
- Release: December 2, 2005

Related
- Knots Landing: Back to the Cul-de-Sac

Knots Landing Reunion: Together Again is a 2005 American television special celebrating the 1979–1993 prime time soap opera Knots Landing. It aired on CBS on Friday, December 2, 2005 from 9:00 to 11:00 p.m. ET/PT.

== Synopsis ==
A retrospective of Knots Landing was made after a similar reunion show, Dallas Reunion: The Return to Southfork, aired the previous year. Produced by the same team, the Knots Landing special reunited most of the original cast members who reminisced about their time working on the series. It also included clips from the show, as well as outtakes and bloopers. The special was filmed on location at the famous Knots Landing cul-de-sac "Seaview Circle" (in reality Crystalaire Place in Los Angeles), with interiors filmed at a newly made studio set reconstruction of the MacKenzie house.

Although not appearing with the main cast, separate segments with stars Alec Baldwin, Don Murray and Nicolette Sheridan were included. Julie Harris (who was in the original series until 1987) made a "surprise" appearance towards the end of the special, much to the delight of the other castmembers. The special actually aired on Harris's 80th birthday.

Knots Landing creator and executive producer David Jacobs (who also created Dallas) also recorded a segment for the special, as did his co-executive producer Michael Filerman. The two discussed how the series was originally created and its various changes throughout its fourteen-year run.

One segment of the special, featuring actors Ted Shackelford and Joan Van Ark on the front lawn of their Knots Landing house, was included as a bonus feature on the Knots Landing Season One DVD release in 2006. To date, no other part of the special (or whole) has been commercially released.
