= Knots Landing: Back to the Cul-de-Sac =

- Main title screens
- Written by: Ann Marcus; Lisa Seidman; Julie Sayres
- Directed by: Bill Corcoran
- Starring: William Devane; Kevin Dobson; Michele Lee; Donna Mills; Ted Shackelford; Joan Van Ark; Michelle Phillips; Stacy Galina
- Music by: Jerrold Immel
- Country of origin: United States
- Original language: English

Production
- Producers: Michael Filerman; David Jacobs; Phil Parslow; Joel Okmin
- Cinematography: John Fleckenstein
- Editors: David Campling; Robert Phillips
- Running time: 2 x 120 mins. (inc. commercials)
- Production company: Warner Bros. Television

Original release
- Network: CBS
- Release: May 7 – May 9, 1997

Related
- Knots Landing; Knots Landing Reunion: Together Again

Knots Landing: Back to the Cul-de-Sac is a 1997 American television miniseries which is a continuation of the 1979–1993 prime time soap opera Knots Landing and takes place four years after the series ended. Directed by Bill Corcoran, the four-hour miniseries was originally broadcast in two parts on CBS on May 7 and 9, 1997.

The miniseries reunites cast members William Devane, Kevin Dobson, Michele Lee, Donna Mills, Ted Shackelford, Joan Van Ark, Michelle Phillips and Stacy Galina in starring roles. It also includes cameo appearances by cast members Tonya Crowe, Brian Austin Green, Kim Lankford, Claudia Lonow, Patrick Petersen and Nicollette Sheridan.

== Synopsis ==
=== Part One ===
The mini-series opens up with Paige Matheson (Nicollette Sheridan) ending her longstanding relationship with Greg Sumner (William Devane), as she wants to have a baby but he doesn't. Meanwhile, recently unemployed factory workers turn to Mack MacKenzie (Kevin Dobson) for help in suing Greg for wrongful termination. When Greg bought the factory from Gary Ewing (Ted Shackelford), he fired everyone regardless of the written agreement he signed promising not to close the factory. The agreement, however, is in a box somewhere in the Ewing warehouse. Back at the Seaview Circle cul-de-sac, Valene (Joan Van Ark) throws Mack and Karen (Michele Lee) a party for their 15th wedding anniversary. Many of the past and present residents of Knots Landing are there, including Karen's grown children Diana (Claudia Lonow) and Michael (Patrick Petersen), as is former neighbor Ginger Ward (Kim Lankford). Karen's conniving ex sister-in-law and neighbor Abby Fairgate (Donna Mills) is also present, as well as Abby's two grown children, Olivia (Tonya Crowe) and Brian (Brian Austin Green). During the party, Abby announces to Karen and Val that she will be moving to Malibu, California, but the joy is short-lived when the IRS freezes all of her assets for failure to pay over $1 million in back taxes. Abby then convinces Greg to pay her $1 million to steal the agreement from Gary's company warehouse. As she is homeless, she persuades Mack and Karen to allow her to stay with them and gets a job working at Karen and Gary's construction company so that she can find the agreement Greg needs.

Meanwhile, Greg is surprised when Anne Matheson-Sumner (Michelle Phillips) returns after four years in Paris. Mack and Karen are approached by Meg (Francesca Marie Smith), their 12-year-old adopted daughter, who asks for the truth about the identity of her biological father. Mack will never reveal the answer and chooses to lie to Meg again. Val, who has written a best-selling book called "Hostage" about her year-long kidnapping four years earlier, has been contracted by a major film studio to adapt the book into a screenplay. The studio assign Clay McKinney (Michael Woods), a once promising writer whose career was plagued by his alcoholism, to be her writing partner. Meanwhile, Gary gets an unexpected visit from Kate Whittaker (Stacy Galina), Greg's niece with whom he had a relationship some years earlier. Kate tells Gary that she was pregnant when she left Knots Landing four years earlier and that Gary is the father of her daughter, Molly (Jessica D. Stone). Clay's drinking and persistent advances towards Val begins to compromise their working relationship. After a studio party in which Clay takes credit for Val's work, the two argue. Later at Clay's house, he makes a drunken pass at Val but she pushes him away and he falls down. Without looking back, Val leaves and goes home, but the following morning, Clay's body is found floating face down in his swimming pool.

=== Part Two ===
Val and Gary learn that Clay has been found dead. Because Val was the last person to see Clay alive, the police question her about an earring they found near Clay's pool. Val denies that the earring is hers and refuses to tell Gary what happened that night. Concerned about her secrecy, Gary accuses Val of having an affair with Clay. Greg decides to settle the lawsuit brought against him by Mack and the unemployed workers. This now means the deal with Abby to steal the agreement is off and now she is out the $1 million. However, this news comes too late because Abby already hired her friend Robert Simons (John Laughlin) to break into the Ewing warehouse that night. When she goes to call off the deal, Abby finds the warehouse in flames after Robert accidentally killed a security guard (George Lugg) and then set fire to the warehouse to cover his tracks. Mack is going through a mid-life crisis but refuses to open up to Karen and moves out of their house.

Meanwhile, after Meg accidentally finds out that Greg is her father, she absconds from school and goes to visit him. Greg explains why he allowed Karen and Mack to adopt her after her real mother, Laura (Constance McCashin), died when Meg was still an infant. He plays her a videotape that Laura made for her before her death. Abby, now broke and desperate for money to pay her back taxes, begins to snoop around Greg's private business affairs, determined to find something she can use for blackmail. To her surprise, Greg puts her in charge of an operation in Thailand which will make her rich.

Val decides to tell Gary and the police what really happened at Clay's house the night before he was found dead, and they accept her explanation. Back at the cul-de-sac, Karen and Mack have resolved their differences. Karen's son Michael and his fiance Laurie (Dawn Cody) visit to announce they are expecting their first child. Abby cattily snickers that Karen is going to be a grandmother, but her glee is short-lived when Abby's son Brian arrives with his girlfriend Kate and announce they are also expecting a baby, which means Abby is to be a grandmother too. Gary and Val can hardly control their laughter.

== Production ==
Following the ratings success of the Dallas reunion movie J.R. Returns in 1996, Warner Bros. Television opted to make a reunion movie for Knots Landing which had ended its 14-year run in 1993. The miniseries was filmed in early 1997, with external filming taking place at the series' signature cul-de-sac location in the Granada Hills district of Los Angeles.

Key castmember Nicollette Sheridan (Paige Matheson) initially declined to appear, but later agreed to an uncredited cameo appearance. The video tape of Laura Avery-Sumner's message to her family (recorded before her death ten years earlier) was not shown but was heard, though the audio was rerecorded with another actress's voice as Constance McCashin, who played Laura in the original series, refused to let the original clip she filmed in 1987 be used.

== Reception ==
Television critic Tony Scott wrote in his review for Variety: "Most reliable characterization is by William Devane as wearying but wily Greg Sumner, now married to snooty Anne (Michelle Phillips), whose purpose seems mostly decorative. But Donna Mills, as lovely, layabout Abby Fairgate, gets to display most of the program’s excesses."
