= Lorenzo Caccialanza =

Italian-born American soccer player and actor

- Born: January 28, 1955 (age 70); Cologno Monzese, Italy

Lorenzo Caccialanza (born January 28, 1955) is an Italian-born American football goalkeeper and actor.

== Career ==
=== Football ===
Caccialanza played for several years in the Italian leagues before moving to the United States to pursue an acting career. In 1986, he played for the Hollywood Kickers when they won the Western Soccer Alliance championship. Caccialanza was the league leading goalkeeper.

Caccialanza was an assistant coach with the Marlborough School in Los Angeles.

=== Acting ===
As an actor, Caccialanza is best known for his work on the CBS prime time soap opera Knots Landing as Nick Schillace, the gigolo boyfriend of Claudia Whittaker (played by Kathleen Noone) and Anne Matheson (played by Michelle Phillips). Caccialanza has also appeared on the daytime soap operas, Days of Our Lives and The Bold and the Beautiful. He played the Italian terrorist Marco in Die Hard.

== Personal life ==
Jane Fonda dated Caccialanza for about six months beginning in 1989. She broke up with him and began a relationship with businessman Ted Turner in the middle of 1990.

== Filmography ==
=== Film ===
| Year | Title | Role | Notes |
|---|---|---|---|
| 1988 | Die Hard | Marco | |
| 1990 | Funny About Love | Sotto Voce Maitre d' | |
| 1993 | Entangled | Mark Merylle | |
| 1994 | Don Juan DeMarco | Maitre D' | Uncredited |
| 1997 | In Dark Places | Mortuary Father | |
| 2003 | Just Married | Italian Man | |
| 2005 | Monster-in-Law | Signor Ramondi | Uncredited |
| 2007 | Red Is the Color of | Carlo | |
| 2008 | AmericanEast | Mohammed | Uncredited |

=== Television ===
| Year | Title | Role | Notes |
|---|---|---|---|
| 1989–2006 | Days of Our Lives | Nico | 157 episodes |
| 1990–1993 | Knots Landing | Nick Shillace / Dimitri Pappas | 30 episodes |
| 1992 | Tarzán | Bruno Valletti | 3 episodes |
| 1993 | Acapulco H.E.A.T. | Sergio Lanti | Episode: "Code Name: Million Dollar Ladies (a.k.a. Vanished)" |
| 1994 | Fortune Hunter | Reynoldo Contia | Episode: "Stowaway" |
| 1995 | Murder, She Wrote | Inspector Amati / Insp. Piero Amati | 2 episodes |
| 1996 | Renegade | Aldo | Episode: "Hound Downtown" |
| 1996–2002 | The Bold and the Beautiful | Antonio Giovanni / Signor Orio | 3 episodes |
| 2003, 2005 | Alias | Chancellor / Team Leader | 2 episodes |
| 2019 | Grey's Anatomy | Dr. Vincenzo DeLuca | 3 episodes |
