= Gary Ewing =

- Knots Landing and Dallas character
- Portrayed by: David Ackroyd (1978); Ted Shackelford (1979–2013)
- Duration: 1978–1993, 1997, 2013
- First appearance: September 23, 1978; Reunion, Part 1 (Dallas)
- Last appearance: March 18, 2013; Ewings Unite! (Dallas)
- Created by: David Jacobs
- Spin-off appearances: Knots Landing; Dallas (2012 series)
In-universe information
- Occupation: Former Partner in Lotus Point; Founder and Owner of Gary Ewing Enterprises; Former Owner of Westfork Ranch; Former Shareholder in Ewing Oil; Former Employee at Knots Landing Motors; Co-founder/co-owner of construction company (with Karen MacKenzie)
- Family: Ewing
- Father: Jock Ewing
- Mother: Ellie Ewing
- Stepfather: Clayton Farlow
- Brothers: J. R. Ewing; Bobby Ewing
- Half-brothers: Ray Krebbs
- Spouse: Valene Clements (1961–62, 1979–83, 1991–); Abby Cunningham (1983–87)
- Sons: Bobby Ewing II
- Daughters: Lucy Ewing; Betsy Ewing; Molly Whittaker
- Grandparents: Leander Ewing; Aaron Southworth; Barbara Southworth
- Aunts and uncles: Jason Ewing; Garrison Southworth; Nancy Ewing (née Shaw); Cherie Southworth (née Simmons)
- Nieces and nephews: James Beaumont; John Ross Ewing III; Christopher Ewing; Lucas Krebbs; Margaret Krebbs; Unnamed nephew (J.R.'s son with Cally); Unnamed niece (J.R.'s daughter with an unknown woman)
- First cousins: Jamie Ewing Barnes; Jack Ewing

Garrison Arthur "Gary" Ewing is a fictional character from the CBS soap opera, Knots Landing, a spin-off of Dallas. The character of Gary Ewing was first played by actor David Ackroyd in a two-part Dallas season two episode "Reunion" in 1978. Gary Ewing was the middle son of oil baron Jock and Miss Ellie Ewing, the father of Lucy Ewing and the ex-husband of Valene Ewing. Over a year later, the part of Gary Ewing was recast for the spin-off Knots Landing with actor Ted Shackelford in the role, and Gary became one of the main stars of the series in 1979. Shackelford played Gary Ewing in Knots Landing for its entire fourteen seasons (1979–1993), while continuing to make occasional appearances in Dallas during that time. The character of Gary made his last Knots Landing appearance in 1997 in the reunion miniseries Knots Landing: Back to the Cul-de-Sac. Shackelford reprised his character for the new, updated version of Dallas in 2013.

== Development ==
=== Casting and creation ===
Writer David Jacobs actually created Knots Landing before Dallas, but CBS wanted something more "saga-like" and initially passed on the idea. Jacobs then created Dallas, which the network approved. From the outset, Dallas was centered on the lives of the wealthy Ewing family, who lived at Southfork Ranch outside of Dallas, Texas. Once the show became a success after the five episodes that made up season 1, the producers decided to expand the roles of certain characters. They introduced the parents of Lucy Ewing (Charlene Tilton), who had not been shown on-screen until that point. After the success of Dallas, Jacobs' presented his initial idea for Knots Landing again, with some alterations of his original script. In an interview, Jacobs explained how executives said:"'Is there any way we can make this a spin-off?' I just took one of the couples and made it, you know, Val and Gary who had already been created on the parent series and putting them into the mix, but when you have four couples and you change one, you sort of have to change the dynamic all the way around. However, once I wrote the script, remarkably little changed from the script and the pilot as you would see it." Gary Ewing was originally played by actor David Ackroyd, but Ackroyd was unable to sign on for the spin-off, and the role was recast with Ted Shackelford.

== Character arc ==
=== Dallas ===
Gary Ewing was born in early January 1944 to oil baron Jock Ewing and his wife Miss Ellie Ewing of Dallas, Texas. Gary was their second son having been conceived just before Jock went off to Europe to fight in World War II. As Jock was not with Miss Ellie during her pregnancy with Gary, she tended to view him as more hers than Jock's and Gary became her favorite son, while the relationship between Jock and Gary was always distant. Gary was often considered the black sheep of the family, as he was mostly influenced by his mother and embraced the Southworth tradition of ranching on Southfork and had no interest in Ewing Oil. Gary also tended to run away from the expectations placed on him as Jock Ewing's son, secretly married a woman from "the wrong side of the tracks" just 3 days after meeting her, before bringing his pregnant wife home to meet his family. He became a teenage father, and an alcoholic due to the pressures that were put on him. Jock and older brother J.R. viewed Gary as weak and lacking the Ewing character but Gary was very friendly with his younger brother, Bobby.

Gary married Valene Ewing (Joan Van Ark) in January 1961, when Gary was 17 and Valene was 15. Valene was soon pregnant, and many months into the pregnancy, Valene pestered Gary to take her to visit his family at the Southfork Ranch. They settled at Southfork, much to J.R.'s annoyance. Unlike J.R., Jock liked Valene, but demanded that Gary face up to all his responsibilities as a husband and father. To help the newlyweds out, Miss Ellie gave Gary a job as ranch foreman. Gary and Valene's daughter, Lucy, was born in the fall of 1961. However, J.R. kept harassing the young couple, and Gary and Valene were soon fighting. Under the pressure, Gary took to heavy drinking, became violent, and eventually walked out on his family. With Gary gone, J.R. then forced Valene out of Southfork. Valene fled to Virginia with baby Lucy, and later to her home state of Tennessee, hoping to have her mother, Lilimae Clements, care for her child, but was refused. Valene and Lucy were tracked down by heavies hired by J.R., who ripped Lucy out of Valene's hands and took Lucy back to Southfork, to be raised by her paternal grandparents. When Valene later tried legal action to get Lucy back, J.R. warned Valene that he would kill her if she returned to the state of Texas.

In 1978, Gary bumped into his brother, Bobby, and Bobby's wife, Pam, in Las Vegas. Bobby persuaded Gary to visit Texas. While Gary was visiting, Lucy, his teenage daughter, surprised him by reintroducing him to Valene. For the sake of his ex-wife and daughter, Gary tried to make things work in Texas, but soon came under the old pressures of living up to Jock's expectations and J.R.'s deviousness. J.R. had set Gary up in an office equipment machinery firm in a hope that Gary would fail as usual. To ensure his new found sobriety, he knew he had to leave Southfork and his family once again. Valene tracked Gary down and they reunited, eventually remarrying. As a wedding present, Gary's mother Miss Ellie bought the couple a house in California. Originally, their daughter Lucy was to join them, but this event did not materialize, and she remained at Southfork.

Gary made a few more appearances in Dallas after his move to California; namely the 2 episodes after J.R. was shot, Lucy's first wedding to Mitch Cooper, 2 episodes where Gary received 10 voting shares in Ewing Oil from an absent Jock and Gary then giving these 10 voting shares to Lucy, the reading of Jock's will, Bobby's "funeral" in the first episode of the dream season, and in the final episode "Conundrum" in which J.R. was shown how the world would have turned out if he had never been born. Gary meets Valene for the first time when they are both middle aged and they take a liking to each other.

=== Knots Landing ===
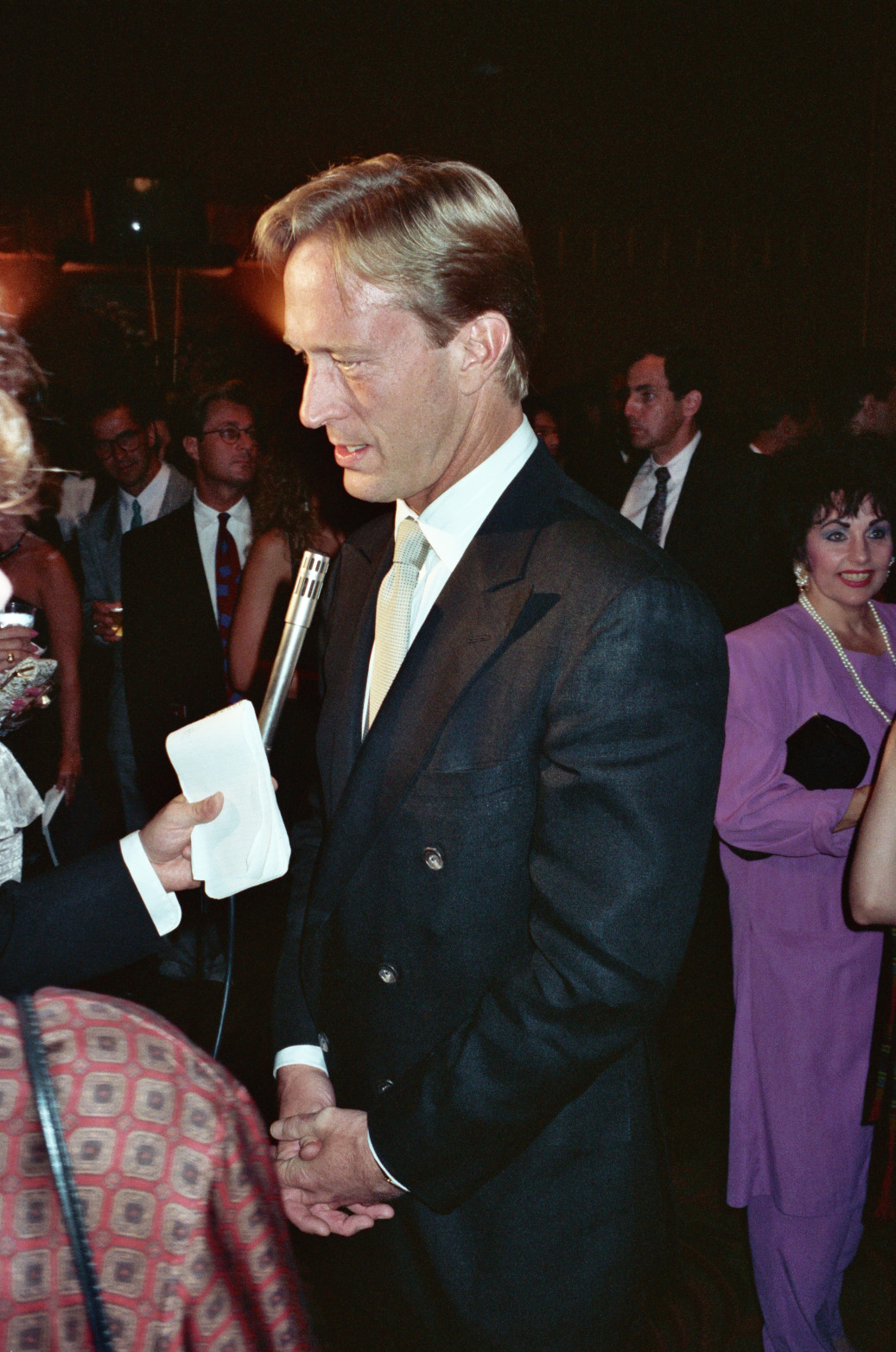
Ted Shackelford (pictured 1990) portrayed the character in Knots Landing.

Gary and Val began their new life in Seaview Circle, a cul-de-sac in the Los Angeles coastal suburb of Knots Landing, just after the start of their second marriage in 1979. There, they met their new neighbors, Sid and Karen Fairgate (Don Murray and Michele Lee), where Gary was offered a job at Knots Landing Motors by Sid. Gary settled down into his new life in California, had a great marriage and was good at his job. However, after being given more responsibility by Sid, who promoted Gary to the position of vice-president of Knots Landing Motors, Gary had a few glasses of champagne, at the urging of his neighbors, who didn't know Gary's past problems with alcohol. It was the first time that Gary had drunk alcohol in over two years. After the initial glasses of champagne, Gary's drinking quickly turned into nasty mood swings and a full blown alcoholic binge. Gary's drinking quickly caused him to hit rock bottom, where he would become extremely aggressive and violent in his desperation for more alcohol, even to the point of possibly killing somebody, and stealing a small bottle of beer from a sleeping homeless man. Val has Gary committed to a rehab facility, lying that Gary had tried to commit suicide in order to get Gary committed. Gary's aggression and violence from falling off the wagon, eventually made Gary admit out loud to himself and to other members of an Alcoholics Anonymous meeting, that he was an alcoholic.

With the arrival of Sid's sister, Abby Cunningham (Donna Mills), Gary soon found himself lusting after her, as she did for him. After initially rejecting Abby's advances, Gary and Abby eventually slept together and had an affair, until Val discovered it. With Gary being thrown out of his marital home by Val, he moved in with Abby. When his father, Jock Ewing, was declared legally dead as a result of a plane crash in South America, Gary stood to inherit millions of dollars. However, Jock's will stipulated that although Gary was to inherit $10 million and 10% of Ewing Oil, he would not be able to access the principal amount and would only be able to live off the interest it accrued, which itself could be $1 million a year. He and Abby moved out of her house in Seaview Circle and into a beach house, while he also started a company called Gary Ewing Enterprises. Gary also became close friends with an up-and-coming singer he discovered called Ciji Dunne (Lisa Hartman), until Ciji was tragically murdered. Gary initially believed that he might have killed her while heavily drunk and he was arrested for her murder, but it was later revealed that he didn't and he was acquitted. A possible reconciliation with Val failed to materialise around this time, and Gary and Val eventually divorced for the second time. Gary also went on to buy a ranch, which he named Westfork, in honor of Southfork Ranch where he grew up. In the mid-1980s, Gary, Abby and their former neighbour Karen Fairgate (now Karen MacKenzie) become joint partners in a new business venture, an upscale coastal resort called Lotus Point.

Gary soon married Abby, as she secretly started her own company, Apolune, and conducted dubious business dealings without Gary's knowledge. After his marriage to Abby, Gary became the stepfather to Abby's children, Olivia and Brian, from Abby's first marriage to Jeff Cunningham. Gary then met Cathy Geary (Lisa Hartman), who looked a lot like Ciji and began a new friendship with her and had her dress and sing like Ciji too. He also later had a relationship with Cathy. During a moment of weakness, Gary had a one-night stand with his ex-wife, Val, and she became pregnant with twins, but Gary assumed that Val's fiancé and future husband, Ben Gibson (Douglas Sheehan), was the father. Val eventually named her twin babies as Bobby and Betsy in the 1985–86 season, after Gary's late brother Bobby and Ben Gibson's mother Betsy. Gary's marriage to Abby eventually broke down, and he began a relationship with Jill Bennett (Teri Austin), who later tried to kill Val as she was jealous of her ties to Gary. In 1989, Gary and Val both inadvertently began dating another former couple, Amanda and Danny Waleksa (Penny Peyser and Sam Behrens). However, while Gary's relationship with Amanda is short-lived, Val goes on to marry Danny but he is revealed to be violent and abusive, and tried to murder Gary. Danny is eventually killed himself after falling into a swimming pool while drunk. Gary and Val eventually reunite again, eight years after their second divorce. Gary and Val also lived together with their children, Bobby and Betsy, for the first time, at Gary's Westfork Ranch. They went on to marry each other for the third time in 1991 (Gary's fourth marriage, and Valene's fifth). In 1992, Gary loses his ranch after an investment goes awry and he and Val return to their house in the Seaview Circle cul-de-sac. Also in 1992, after Val was kidnapped by mafia gangsters in Florida and supposedly killed in a car crash after Gary had tracked her down, a grieving Gary entered into a short-term relationship with a much younger woman, Kate Whittaker (Stacy Galina), who was over 25 years his junior. Kate supported him and his children through their grief of losing Val. However, in the two-part series finale in 1993, Val turned up alive, revealing that she was never in the car that she was presumed to have died in. Gary was extremely happy at his wife still being alive, and they got back together.

In the 1997 miniseries Knots Landing: Back to the Cul-de-Sac, Gary is once again in business with friend and neighbour Karen MacKenzie and they run their own construction business. Kate returns to Knots Landing after four years away and reveals to Gary that he is the father of her young daughter, Molly Whittaker. At this time, Kate was in a relationship with Gary's former stepson, Brian Cunningham, and was pregnant with Brian's baby.

=== Dallas (2012 TV series) ===
Gary returned to Dallas in 2013 to help his brother, Bobby, stop their nephew, John Ross, from drilling for oil on Southfork. Gary informs Bobby that he fell off the wagon again and he and Valene had separated. After his brother J.R.'s death, Gary is very conflicted about his feelings toward J.R. He realizes though that every step he took in life, forward or backward, was because of J.R. In J.R.'s will, he gives Gary an old bottle of Scotch, knowing that Gary is a recovering alcoholic. Later, Sue Ellen calls Valene and she comes to Dallas, where she and Gary reunite and return to their home in California.
