= Ted Shackelford =

Actor

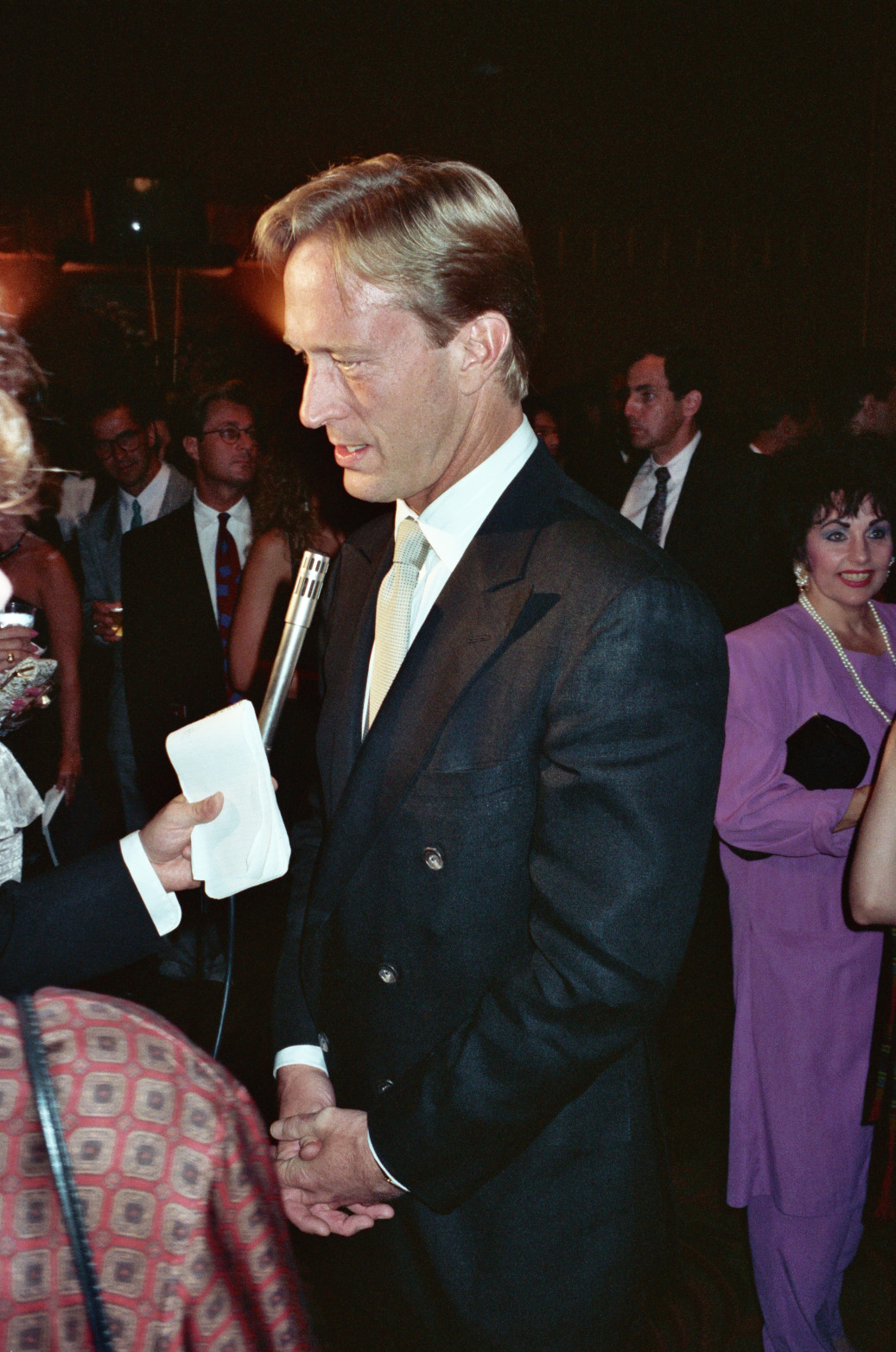
- Shackelford in 1990
- Born: Theodore Tillman Shackelford III; June 23, 1946 (age 80); Oklahoma City, Oklahoma, U.S.
- Occupation: Actor
- Years active: 1975–present
- Spouses: Janis Leverenz (m. 1976; div. 1987) Annett Wolf (m. 1991)
- Partner: Teri Austin (1987–1989)

Theodore Tillman Shackelford III (born June 23, 1946) is an American actor, known for his roles on television. He played Gary Ewing in the CBS prime time soap operas Dallas and its spin-off Knots Landing (1979–1993), and had a recurring role portraying twin brothers William and Jeffrey Bardwell on the CBS daytime soap opera, The Young and the Restless (2006—2015).

== Life and career ==
Shackelford was born in Oklahoma City, Oklahoma, and went to college at the University of Denver. He appeared in the role as Ray Gordon on the daytime soap opera Another World from 1975 to 1977. He later appeared on prime time series Wonder Woman (where he guest starred with Joan Van Ark) and The Rockford Files. He is most known for being cast as Gary Ewing, the middle son of oil baron Jock and Miss Ellie Ewing, the father of Lucy Ewing and the husband of Valene Ewing in the CBS prime time soap opera, Dallas in 1979. The role was originally played by actor David Ackroyd, who was unable to return for future appearances after his 1978 turn as the character. Shackelford later became one of the main stars of the CBS television series Knots Landing, in which he starred from 1979 to 1993. He later starred in the 1997 miniseries, Knots Landing: Back to the Cul-de-Sac. Shackelford also starred in a reunion special called Knots Landing Reunion: Together Again with some of his former costars in December 2005 on the CBS network.

Shackelford starred in the 1987 adventure film Sweet Revenge opposite Nancy Allen in his cinematic debut. He guest-starred on Soap, Hotel, Alfred Hitchcock Presents, The Twilight Zone and The Young Riders during his Knots Landing years. He starred in the made-for-television movies Baby of the Bride (1991), Mother of the Bride (1993), Dying to Remember (1993), Sweet Temptation (1996) and Stolen Women: Captured Hearts (1997). From 1994 to 1995, Shackelford starred in the British science-fiction series Space Precinct. He had a recurring role in the 1996 The WB primetime soap opera Savannah, and the following years appeared on Cybill, The Outer Limits, The Practice and Dirty Sexy Money.

On February 2, 2006, Shackelford joined the cast of the daytime soap opera The Young and the Restless as Genoa City district attorney William Bardwell. His last air date on the popular soap as William Bardwell was on July 18, 2007, when his character succumbed to complications caused by a stroke. However, on August 7, 2007, Shackelford returned to the show as Bardwell's identical twin brother, Jeffrey Bardwell. He last appeared in the series on January 9, 2015.

In 2013, Shackelford reprised the role of Gary Ewing in three episodes during the second season of Dallas series on TNT, including the episode for J.R.'s funeral. In his last episode, he was reunited with Joan Van Ark as Valene.

== Personal Life ==
Shackelford was married from 1976 to 1987 to Janis Leverenz.

== After Knots Landing ==
Shackelford appeared on an episode of Home & Family in December 2014. He reunited with Knots Landing cast members Michele Lee, Donna Mills, Joan Van Ark, and Kevin Dobson.

== Filmography ==
- Another World as Raymond 'Ray' Gordon #1 (1975–1977)
- Wonder Woman as Adam and Pete (2 episodes, 1977–1978)
- The Defection of Simas Kudirka (1978) as Blain
- The Jordan Chance (1978) as Brian Klosky
- Ebony, Ivory & Jade (1979) as Barnes
- The Rockford Files as Eric Genther (1 episode, 1979)
- Soap as R.C. (1 episode, 1980)
- Terror Among Us (1981) as Delbert Ramsey
- Summer Fantasy (1984) as Carlisle
- Alfred Hitchcock Presents as Garret (1 episode, 1987)
- Hotel as Tom Webb/Richard Anderson (2 episodes, 1984–1987)
- Sweet Revenge (1987) as Boone
- The Twilight Zone as Fr. Mark Cassidy (1 episode, 1988)
- The Young Riders as Lucas Malone (1 episode, 1989)
- Guns of Paradise as Preston McMillian (1 episode, 1989)
- Dallas as Gary Ewing (9 episodes, 1979–1991)
- Baby of the Bride (1991) as John Hix
- Knots Landing as Gary Ewing (336 episodes, 1979–1993)
- The Commish as Steve Ennis (2 episodes, 1993)
- Mother of the Bride (1993) as John Hix
- Dying to Remember (1993) as Mark Gage
- Harvest for the Heart (1994) as Jacob 'Jake' Hansen
- The Spider and the Fly (1994) as Michael Moore
- Space Precinct as Lieutenant Patrick Brogan (24 episodes, 1994–1995)
- Touched by an Angel as Joel Redding (1 episode, 1996)
- Savannah as Charles Alexander (7 episodes, 1996)
- Sweet Temptation (1996) as Les Larson
- Stolen Women, Captured Hearts (1997) as Reverend Brewster
- Knots Landing: Back to the Cul-de-Sac as Gary Ewing (1997)
- Promised Land as Brad Elias (1 episode, 1998)
- Rescue Me (1988) as Jerry
- Cybill as Bobbie Ray Weeks (1 episode, 1998)
- The Outer Limits as High Secretary Paul Kohler (episode: "The Grell") (1999)
- The Practice as Dr. Stiles (1 episode, 2000)
- Cruel Intentions 2 (2001) as First Chauffaur
- Spin City as Barry (1 episode, 2001)
- Panic (2002) as Captain O'Kelly
- Jane White Is Sick & Twisted (2002) as Eddie
- Cave In (2003) as Chief Bogen
- Miracle Dogs (2003) as Dr. Ben Logan
- Officer Down (2005) as Commissioner Donald Hallows
- Crossing Jordan as Emmett Parker (1 episode, 2005)
- Dirty Sexy Money as Dr. Peter Delafield (1 episode, 2007)
- The Young and the Restless as William Bardwell and Jeffrey Bardwell (384 episodes, 2006–2015)
- Dallas as Gary Ewing (3 episodes, 2013)
- NCIS as Stewart (1 episode, 2017)
