= Kevin Dobson =

American film and television actor (1943–2020)

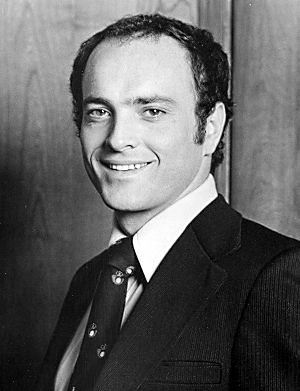
- Dobson in Kojak (1975)
- Born: Kevin Patrick Dobson; March 18, 1943; Jackson Heights, Queens, New York, U.S.
- Died: September 6, 2020 (aged 77); Stockton, California, U.S.
- Occupation: Actor
- Years active: 1968–2017
- Spouse: Susan Dobson (m. 1968)
- Children: 3

Kevin Patrick Dobson (March 18, 1943 – September 6, 2020) was an American film and television actor, best known for his roles as Detective Bobby Crocker, the trusted protege of Lt. Theo Kojak (played by Telly Savalas) in the CBS crime drama Kojak (1973–1978), and as M. Patrick "Mack" MacKenzie in the prime time soap opera Knots Landing (1982–1993).

On April 1, 2008, Dobson made his first appearance in the NBC Daytime soap opera Days of Our Lives in the role of Mickey Horton.

== Early life ==
Dobson was born in Jackson Heights, New York, and was of Irish descent. He was one of seven children born to the janitor of a grammar school (Our Lady of Fatima, Jackson Heights) and a stay-at-home mother. Before embarking on an acting career, Dobson worked as a trainman, brakeman, and conductor for the Long Island Rail Road, followed by a few years as a waiter.

== Career ==
After a brief appearance in the 1971 film Klute, and small roles in television series such as The Mod Squad, Emergency!, and Cannon, Dobson signed a contract with Universal Studios in 1972. It led to his role of Det. Bobby Crocker, Lt. Theo Kojak's young partner, in the television series Kojak, opposite Telly Savalas. For the role, he had to borrow a suit. He had twice auditioned and failed, then called his agent, telling him, "'Do what you have to do,' so he called in a favor and I read for them [again]. I was a military policeman in the Army, so I knew how to hold a gun and throw somebody against a wall. I got a call [the next night] asking if I'd sign a contract." Dobson auditioned for a third time and finally won the role. He remained with Kojak for its entire five-season run from 1973 to 1978, and later reunited with Savalas for the 1990 television movie, Kojak: It's Always Something, his character having become an assistant district attorney. They remained friends until Savalas's death from bladder cancer in 1994.

In 1976, Dobson was on Battle of the Network Stars with Savalas (Captain), Adrienne Barbeau, Gary Burghoff, Pat Harrington, Bill Macy, Lee Meriwether, Mackenzie Phillips, Loretta Swit, and Jimmie Walker. In 1978, Dobson played Pete Lomas in the two-part television movie The Immigrants, based on the novel by Howard Fast.

In 1981, Dobson starred as Det. Jack Shannon, a San Francisco police officer who is a single father, is on the CBS series Shannon. However, the show failed to gain substantial ratings and was cancelled after nine episodes. A more successful television role for Dobson followed in 1982 as M. Patrick "Mack" MacKenzie in the prime-time soap opera Knots Landing, opposite Michele Lee. He joined the show at the beginning of its fourth season in September 1982 and remained in the role until its cancellation in 1993. Dobson won five Soap Opera Digest Awards for his work on the series. He later reunited with his Knots Landing co-stars for a miniseries, Knots Landing: Back to the Cul-de-Sac in 1997, and again in the 2005 non-fiction special Knots Landing Reunion: Together Again.

Dobson also appeared in a number of feature films, most notably the World War II movie Midway (1976) alongside Henry Fonda and Charlton Heston, as Ensign George Gay — a pilot and the sole survivor of Torpedo Squadron Eight from the Aircraft Carrier USS Hornet's ill-fated opening attack against the Japanese fleet on June 4, 1942. Another prominent role was as Bobby Gibbons, the husband of Cheryl Gibbons (Barbra Streisand) in the 1981 romantic comedy All Night Long. He also had a small role as a priest in the well-received 2007 psychological horror film 1408.

Dobson continued to appear in a number of television roles, including the syndicated F/X: The Series for one season (1996–1997) and the daytime drama series One Life to Live (2003), The Bold and the Beautiful (2006–2007), and Days of Our Lives, where he was the fourth and final actor to play original character Mickey Horton. He featured in 15 episodes of the show from April to October 2008. The character then left with no explanation, before being "killed off" in January 2010. Although Mickey is best remembered for being portrayed by veteran soap actor John Clarke for almost 40 years, Dobson instead appeared as Mickey in the character's final appearances in 2008.

=== Stage roles ===
Dobson starred in the Tony Award winning play 'Art' at the Royal George Theater in Chicago. He originated the role of Steve Gallop in the world premiere of the American Theatre Critics Association nominated stage play "If it was Easy..." at The 7Stages Theater in Atlanta, Georgia, and appeared in many other stage roles across the United States.

He starred with Richard Thomas in the 2009 stage production of 12 Angry Men. Dobson stated, concerning actors who are afraid of being typecast, "You should be so lucky."

=== Affiliations ===
Dobson, a former Army soldier (MP), served twice as chairman of the National Salute To Hospitalized Veterans. Having long assisted with the needs of hospitalized veterans, Dobson received the AMVETS (American Veterans) Silver Helmet Peace Award and the American Legion Award. Dobson, was a life member of AMVETS and also a charter member of AMVETS MOH Richard A. Pittman Post #1947 - Stockton, California.

== Personal life ==
Dobson married his wife, Susan, in 1968. They had three children: Mariah, Patrick and Sean.

He was the chairman of the United Veterans Council of San Joaquin County (UVCSJC).

== Death ==
Dobson died on September 6, 2020, at a Stockton, California hospital, after struggling with an autoimmune deficiency . UVCSJC reported his death the following day. He was 77.

== Filmography ==
=== Films ===
Year	Title	Role	Notes
1971	Klute	Man at Bar	Uncredited
1976	Midway	Ensign George H. Gay Jr.	
1981	All Night Long	Bobby Gibbons	
1999	Restraining Order	Police Captain	
1999	Nathan Grimm	Nathan Grimm	Short
2002	She's No Angel	Donald Shawnessy	
2005	Crash Landing	Henderson Davis	Direct-to-DVD
2007	1408	Priest	
2007	April Moon	Jeffrey	
2009	Portal	Benedict	Direct-to-video
2011	The Representative	Hon. Justice Evans	
2013	Dark Power	Mayor Stan Wood	
2014	Full Circle	Henry	Short

=== Television ===
Year	Title	Role	Notes
1969–1971	The Doctors	various roles, 8 episodes	Policeman on May 19 and 20 1969
1971	The Mod Squad	Howie	Episode: "Feet of Clay"
1972	The Rookies		Pilot, Uncredited
1972	Emergency!	First Deputy	Episode: "Decision"
1972	Ironside	Young Marine	Episode: "Nightmare Trip"
1972	Cannon	Hotel Security Guard	Episode: "The Shadow Man"
1973–1978	Kojak	Det. Bobby Crocker	117 episodes
1973	Police Story	Patrolman	Episode: "Slow Boy"
1976	Stranded	Rafe Harder	Television movie
1977	Captain Kangaroo	Mac Hasty	Television series
1978	The Immigrants	Pete Lomas	Television movie
1978	Greatest Heroes of the Bible	Joab	Episode: "The Judgment of Solomon"
1979	Transplant	John Hurley	Television movie
1979	Orphan Train	Carlin	Television movie
1980	Hardhat and Legs	Sal Pacheco	Television movie
1980	Reunion	Don Hollander	Television movie
1980	Mark, I Love You	Hal Painter	Television movie
1981–1982	Shannon	Det. Jack Shannon	9 episodes
1981	Margin for Murder	Mike Hammer	Television movie
1982–1993	Knots Landing	M. Patrick "Mack" MacKenzie	291 episodes Soap Opera Digest Award: Favorite Super Couple on a Prime Time Serial (with Michele Lee) (1986); Favorite Super Couple: Prime Time (with Michele Lee); Outstanding Actor in a Leading Role: Prime Time; Outstanding Hero: Prime Time; Outstanding Actor: Prime Time (1988, 1991-1992); Nominated—Soap Opera Digest Award: Outstanding Actor in a Leading Role on a Prime Time Serial; Outstanding Actress/Actor in a Comic Relief Role on a Prime Time Serial (1986)
1982	CBS Schoolbreak Special	Jim Welsh	Episode: "Help Wanted"
1984	Tales of the Unexpected	Fred Pearson	Episode:' "The Dirty Detail" Also starring George Peppard
1984	Sweet Revenge	Col. Joseph Cheever	Television movie
1989	Money, Powder, Murder	Peter Finley	Television movie
1990	Kojak: It's Always Something	Assistant District Attorney Bobby Crocker	Television movie
1990	Casey's Gift: For Love of a Child	Hank Bolen	Television movie
1991	Fatal Friendship	Michael	Television movie
1992	Dirty Work	Tom	Television movie
1992	A House of Secrets of Lies	Jack Evans	Television movie
1993	The Conviction of Kitty Dodds	Chuck Hayes	Television movie
1994	Burke's Law	Sheriff Greene	Episode: "Who Killed Good Time Charlie?"
1994	Touched by an Angel	Coach Earl Rowley	Episode: "Show Me the Way Home"
1994	The Commish	Frank Botrell	Episode: "Revenge"
1995	If Someone Had Known	Jack Liner	Television movie
1996–1997	F/X: The Series	Det. Leo McCarthy	22 episodes
1996	Voice from the Grave	Det. Joe Sraccula	Television movie
1997	Knots Landing: Back to the Cul-de-Sac	Mack MacKenzie	Miniseries
1997	Early Edition	Darrel Foster	Episode: "March in Time"
1998	Nobody Lives Forever	Lt. Jim Ransom	Television movie
2000	Chicken Soup for the Soul		Episode: "The Two Sides of Love"
2000	Nash Bridges	Raymond Porter	Episode: "Double Trouble"
2001	The Haunted Heart	Mr. Hopkins	Television short
2001	She's No Angel	Donald Shawnessy	Television movie
2003-2005	One Life to Live	Gov. Harrison Brooks	Television series
2005	Knots Landing Reunion: Together Again	Himself	Television special
2006–2007	The Bold and the Beautiful	Judge Devin Owens	13 episodes
2007	Christmas at Cadillac Jack's	Cop	Television movie
2008	Days of Our Lives	Mickey Horton	15 episodes
2008	Cold Case	Mickey Thompson '08	Episode: "The Dealer"
2012	CSI: Crime Scene Investigation	Malcolm Turner	Episode: "Ms. Willows Regrets"
2012	Hawaii Five-0	Al Shepard	Episode: "Ha'alele"
2013	House of Lies	Mr. Pinkus	4 episodes
2013	Damn Sea Vampires	Glenn Hunter	Television movie
2014	Anger Management	Dr. Cameron	Episode: "Charlie and his Probation Officer's Daughter"
2017	12 to Midnight		Episode: "Nana's Pancakes"
