= William Devane =

American actor (born 1939)

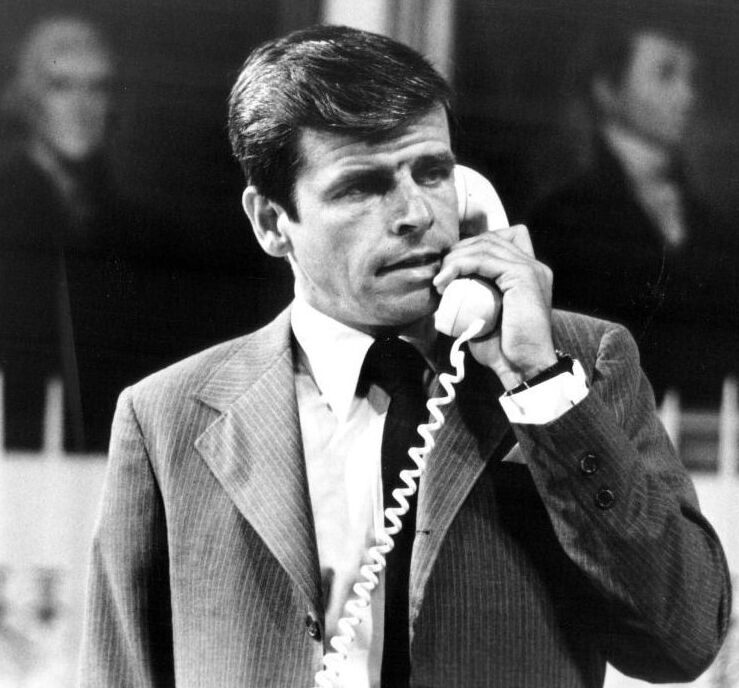
- Devane in The Missiles of October (1974)
- Born: William Joseph Devane; September 5, 1939 (age 87); Albany, New York, U.S.
- Education: American Academy of Dramatic Arts
- Occupation: Actor
- Years active: 1966–present
- Spouse: Eugenie McCabe (m. 1962; died 2022)
- Children: 2

William Joseph Devane (born September 5, 1939) is an American actor. He is known for his role as Greg Sumner on the primetime soap opera Knots Landing (1983–1993) and as James Heller on the Fox serial dramas 24 (2005–2007) and 24: Live Another Day (2014). He is also known for his work in films such as Family Plot (1976), Marathon Man (1976), Rolling Thunder (1977), Payback (1999), and Space Cowboys (2000).

== Early life ==
Devane was born on September 5, 1939, in Albany, New York, the son of Joseph Devane, who had been Franklin D. Roosevelt's chauffeur when he was governor of New York. His father was of Irish descent and his mother Kate had Dutch and German ancestry. Devane graduated from Philip Schuyler High School in Albany, and then the American Academy of Dramatic Arts in New York City in 1962.

== Career ==
Devane began his acting career with the New York Shakespeare Festival, where he performed in fifteen plays.

In 1966, Devane portrayed Robert F. Kennedy in the off-Broadway spoof MacBird. He gained acclaim for his role as President John F. Kennedy in a television docudrama about the Cuban Missile Crisis, The Missiles of October (1974) and again when he played blacklisted radio personality John Henry Faulk in the Emmy Award-winning TV movie Fear on Trial (1975). Devane starred as Master Sgt. Milt Warden in the miniseries remake of From Here to Eternity (1979); he later reprised that role in a weekly series that was canceled after one season. Devane is widely known for his ten years as the ambitious and hardnosed politician-turned-corporate titan Greg Sumner on Knots Landing.

In 1971, he starred off-Broadway as Randle McMurphy in the first stage revival of One Flew Over the Cuckoo's Nest alongside Danny DeVito as Martini, who would go on to reprise the role in the acclaimed film of the same name alongside Jack Nicholson.

In 1994, Devane appeared as Al Capone in Lois & Clark: The New Adventures of Superman in an episode entitled "That Old Gang of Mine". He had a recurring role as the lead character's father on the CBS show Early Edition (1996–2000), and appeared in the films McCabe & Mrs. Miller (1971); Lady Liberty (1971); Family Plot (1976), directed by Alfred Hitchcock; Marathon Man (1976); Rolling Thunder (1977); Yanks (1979); with Jane Alexander in Testament (1983); with Lauren Hutton and Klaus Kinski in Timestalkers (1987); with John Shea in Forgotten Sins (1996); Exception to the Rule (1997); Payback (1999); Hollow Man (2000), and Space Cowboys (2000).

Devane has played members of the Presidential Cabinet on two evening dramas. In 2004, on The West Wing, he guest-starred as the secretary of state and potential vice presidential nominee. Devane appeared in several scenes with Martin Sheen; they also appeared together as President John F. Kennedy and his brother Robert, respectively, 30 years earlier in The Missiles of October (1974). In 2005, he joined the cast of 24 as Secretary of Defense James Heller for seasons four through six.

In 2004, Devane appeared in three episodes of Stargate SG-1 as President Henry Hayes and appears in the direct-to-DVD movie Stargate: Continuum. He also co-starred in the short-lived sitcom Crumbs and as Brian's real-estate broker father in What About Brian (2006–07). In 2008, he appeared in Russ Emanuel's Chasing the Green alongside Jeremy London, Ryan Hurst, and Robert Picardo. He also appears as police officer turned psychologist Dr. Dix in the Jesse Stone mystery movies with Tom Selleck. In 2010, he appeared in the NCIS episode "Worst Nightmare," written by Steven D. Binder, as a grandfather who is not what he appears to be, and is actually a former U.S. deep-cover special-operations agent, of a child kidnapped from Marine Corps Base Quantico. Also in 2010, Devane guest starred as retired Detective Peters along with Carl Weathers in episode 6 of season 5 of Psych, Viagra Falls.

In 2012, Devane began a recurring role as Grandpa Edward Grayson on the ABC primetime soap opera Revenge. Devane also played the President of the United States in the Christopher Nolan film The Dark Knight Rises. Devane reprised his role as James Heller, now President, in the limited-run series 24: Live Another Day (2014).

Devane had a cameo role as Williams, as part of NASA, in the film Interstellar (2014), and was also part of the regular cast of the sitcom The Grinder. In 2022, he appeared in a four-episode guest arc on the Amazon Prime Video detective series Bosch: Legacy.

== Personal life ==
He married Eugenie McCabe in 1962. They lived in Sherman Oaks, Los Angeles, with their two sons. Eugenie died in 2022.

Devane's 12-year-old horse died in 1984, of what he claimed was neglect from the caretakers who boarded the horse. He filed a lawsuit for $2 million against Aramus Arabians Ranch, owned by singer Wayne Newton who was not a party to the suit.

== Filmography ==
=== Film ===
Year	Title	Role	Notes
1967	In the Country	Unknown	
1969	Gunsmith of Williamsburg	The Narrator	
1971	The Pursuit of Happiness	Pilot	
1971	The 300 Year Weekend	Tom	
1971	McCabe & Mrs. Miller	Clement Samuels, Esq	
1971	My Old Man's Place	Jimmy Pilgrim	
1971	Lady Liberty	Jock Fenner	
1972	The Irish Whiskey Rebellion	Lieutenant Ashley	
1975	Report to the Commissioner	Assistant District Attorney Jackson	
1976	Family Plot	Arthur Adamson / Edward Shoebridge	
1976	Marathon Man	Commander Peter "Janey" Janeway	
1977	The Bad News Bears in Breaking Training	Mike Leak	
1977	Rolling Thunder	Major Charles Rane	
1979	The Dark	Roy Warner	
1979	Yanks	Captain John	
1981	Honky Tonk Freeway	Mayor Kirby T. Calo	
1983	Hadley's Rebellion	Coach Ball	
1983	Testament	Tom Wetherly	
1990	Vital Signs	Dr. Chatham	
1994	Lady in Waiting (Alternate title: Hollywood Madam)	Lieutenant Barrett	
1997	Exception to the Rule	Lawrence Kellerman	
1999	Payback	Carter	
2000	Poor White Trash	Ron Lake	
2000	Space Cowboys	Flight Director Eugene "Gene" Davis	
2000	Hollow Man	Dr. Howard Kramer	
2001	Race to Space	Roger Thornhill	
2002	The Badge	The Judge	
2002	Threat of Exposure	Colonel Weldon	
2003	The Wind Effect	L.T. Porter	
2008	The Fall	Judge Stanley Seeban	
2009	The Least Among You	Alan Beckett	
2009	Chasing the Green	Victor Gatling	
2010	The River Why	"Dutch" Hines	
2010	The Kane Files: Life of Trial	Thompson	
2011	Flag of My Father	Jake	
2012	The Dark Knight Rises	The President	
2013	Bad Turn Worse	"Big Red"	
2014	50 to 1	Leonard "Doc" Blach	
2014	Interstellar	Williams	
2015	Truth	Gen. Hodges	Voice; Uncredited

=== Television ===
- N.Y.P.D. (3 episodes, 1967–1969)
- Medical Center (1 episode, 1970 "Ghetto Clinic")
- Young Dr. Kildare (1 episode, 1972)
- Gunsmoke (1 episode, 1973)
- Ironside (Episode “Down All the Way”, 1973 Character of Smiley)
- The Bait (Unsold TV Pilot, 1973)
- Mannix (1 episode, 1974)
- Hawaii Five-O (1 episode, 1974)
- The Missiles of October (TV Movie, 1974)
- Fear on Trial (TV Movie, 1975)
- Red Alert (TV Movie, 1977)
- Black Beauty (TV miniseries) (1978)
- From Here to Eternity (TV Pilot, 1979)
- From Here to Eternity (11 episodes, 1980)
- Red Flag: The Ultimate Game (TV Movie, 1981)
- The Other Victim (TV Movie, 1981)
- The Big Easy (unsold TV pilot, 1982)
- Insight (1 episode, 1982)
- Jane Doe (TV Movie, 1983)
- With Intent to Kill (aka Urge To Kill) (TV Movie, 1984)
- Timestalkers (TV Movie, 1987)
- Murder C.O.D. (TV Movie, 1990)
- A Woman Named Jackie (TV miniseries) (1991)
- Nightmare in Columbia County (aka Victim of Beauty) (TV Movie, 1991)
- Obsessed (TV Movie, 1992)
- Knots Landing (269 episodes, 1983–1993)
- Phenom (21 episodes, 1993–1994)
- Lois & Clark: The New Adventures of Superman (1 episode, 1994)
- For the Love of Nancy (TV Movie, 1994)
- Falling from the Sky: Flight 174 (TV Movie, 1995)
- Virus (TV Movie, 1995)
- Night Watch (TV Movie, 1995)
- The Monroes (8 episodes, 1995)
- The Absolute Truth (TV Movie, 1997)
- Doomsday Rock (TV Movie, 1997)
- Timecop (1 episode, 1997)
- Knots Landing: Back to the Cul-de-Sac (1997)
- Touched by an Angel (1 episode, 1997)
- Turks (13 episodes, 1999)
- Early Edition (5 episodes, 1997–1999)
- The Man Who Used To Be Me (TV Movie, 2000)
- The Michael Richards Show (7 episodes, 2000)
- Judging Amy (1 episode, 2002)
- The X-Files (1 episode, "The Truth" 2002)
- A Christmas Visitor (TV Movie, 2002)
- Monte Walsh (TV Movie, 2003)
- The West Wing (2 episodes, 2003)
- Stargate SG-1 (3 episodes, 2004)
- Crumbs (13 episodes, 2006)
- Jesse Stone: Death in Paradise (TV Movie, 2006)
- What About Brian (6 episodes, 2006–2007)
- 24 (20 episodes, 2005–2007)
- Jesse Stone: Sea Change (TV Movie, 2007)
- Stargate Continuum (TV Movie, 2008)
- Jesse Stone: Thin Ice (TV Movie, 2009)
- Jesse Stone: No Remorse (TV Movie, 2010)
- King of the Hill (1 episode, 2010)
- Psych (1 episode, 2010)
- NCIS (1 episode, 2010)
- Jesse Stone: Innocents Lost (TV Movie, 2011)
- Good Morning, Killer (TV Movie, 2011)
- Red Clover (TV Movie, 2012)
- Jesse Stone: Benefit of the Doubt (TV Movie, 2012)
- Revenge (2 episodes, 2012)
- 24: Live Another Day (12 episodes, 2014)
- The Grinder (22 episodes, 2015)
- Jesse Stone: Lost in Paradise (TV Movie, 2015)
- Bosch: Legacy (4 episodes to date as of May 11, 2022)
