= David Jacobs (writer) =

American television writer, producer, and director (1939–2023)

- Born: August 12, 1939; Baltimore, Maryland, U.S.
- Died: August 20, 2023 (aged 84); Burbank, California, U.S.
- Education: Maryland Institute College of Art
- Occupations: Television writer, producer, and director
- Years active: 1975–2005
- Notable work: Dallas; Knots Landing; Paradise
- Spouse(s): Lynn Pleshette (? - ?) (divorced) (1 child); Diana Jacobs (1977–2023; his death) (2 children)
- Children: 3

David Arnold Jacobs (August 12, 1939 – August 20, 2023) was an American television writer, producer, and director. He is most well known as the creator of the CBS primetime series Dallas, Knots Landing, and Paradise.

== Life and career ==
David Jacobs was born on August 12, 1939, in Baltimore, Maryland, the elder of two children (with a younger sister named Susan) to Melvin and Ruth Jacobs. His Jewish parents were of modest means, and Jacobs's father worked as a household appliance salesman. Jacobs was educated at Baltimore City College High School, and received a BFA from the Maryland Institute College of Art. Soon after graduation, he moved to New York City, where he worked as an illustrator and researcher for Grolier's Encyclopedia. He soon branched out as a freelance writer of nonfiction articles, the best known of which concerned the architect and inventor Buckminster Fuller. He also wrote a children's book on the great artists of the Renaissance.. In 1975 he co-wrote the non-fiction book "Police, a Precinct at Work", with Sara Ann Friedman. The book was a series of stories based upon 6 months of the authors' ride-alongs with police from NYPD's 24th precinct.

His marriage to actress Lynn Pleshette produced one child, his daughter Albyn, but ended in divorce. Later, he married his second wife Diana, with whom he had two children, Aaron and Molly. Jacobs moved to Los Angeles to be closer to his daughter, and tried his hand at screenwriting. His script for a proposed unnamed pilot mini series was later named Dallas. The mini series was so successful that the show was picked up as an on-going series and cemented his career as a writer and producer.

Jacobs battled Alzheimer's disease in later years. He died of complications from a series of infections at Providence Saint Joseph Medical Center in Burbank, California, on August 20, 2023. He was 84.

== Filmography ==
Year	Title	Creator	Writer	Producer	Director
1977	Kingston: Confidential		✓		
1977–1978	Family, season 3		✓		
1978–1979	Dallas, seasons 1–3	✓	✓		
1979	Kaz		✓		
1979	Married: The First Year	✓	✓	✓	
1979–1993	Knots Landing	✓	✓	✓	✓
1980	Secrets of Midland Heights		✓	✓	
1982	Behind the Screen		✓	✓	
1982	Chicago Story		✓		
1984	Lace			✓	
1985	Berrenger's			✓	
1986	Dallas: The Early Years		✓	✓	
1988–1991	Paradise	✓	✓	✓	✓
1991–1993	Homefront			✓	
1992–1993	Bodies of Evidence		✓	✓	
1993	The Knots Landing Block Party			✓	
1997	Knots Landing: Back to the Cul-de-Sac			✓	
1998	Four Corners			✓	
2005	Knots Landing Reunion: Together Again			✓	
