= Girlfriend (2010 film) =

- 2011 theatrical poster
- Directed by: Justin Lerner
- Written by: Justin Lerner
- Produced by: Jerad Anderson; Kristina Lauren Anderson; Justin Lerner; Shaun O'Banion
- Starring: Evan Sneider; Shannon Woodward; Amanda Plummer; Jackson Rathbone; Jerad Anderson; Darren MacDonald
- Cinematography: Quyen Tran
- Edited by: Jeff Castelluccio
- Music by: Lawrence Abrams; Jerad Anderson; Ben Graupner; Ben Johnson; Jackson Rathbone
- Production company: Wayne / Lauren Film Company
- Distributed by: Wayne/Lauren Film Company (theatrical), Strand Releasing (DVD / VOD)
- Release dates: September 12, 2010 (TIFF); July 15, 2011 (New York City)
- Running time: 94 minutes
- Country: United States
- Language: English
- Budget: $200,000 USD (estimate)

Girlfriend is a 2010 American independent drama film written and directed by Justin Lerner. The film stars newcomer Evan Sneider, along with Shannon Woodward, Amanda Plummer, Jackson Rathbone, Jerad Anderson, Darren MacDonald, and made its debut at the 2010 Toronto International Film Festival in Toronto, Ontario, Canada.

== Plot ==
Evan is a teenager with Down syndrome who resides with his mother, Celeste, in a working-class small town. Evan is shy and reserved and has spent most of his life in protected seclusion with his mother, who worries about how well he can adapt in the world on his own. But when he inherits a fortune unexpectedly, Evan sees it as an opportunity to begin taking control of his life and pursuing something he really desires---Candy, a young mother he's long admired from afar. Candy, a waitress at a local diner, has always been nice to Evan, and he feels special around her in a way that few others ever do. But her life is far from simple, as she battles to care for her son and battle the toxic reach of her abuser of a former boyfriend, Russ.

Despite Candy's hardships, Evan is determined in his quest to woo her, funding her and offering her a respite from her difficult situation with his newfound wealth. His behavior, though kind, begins to blur the lines between friendship, love, and emotional addiction. Candy, caught between gratitude and discomfort, is hesitant to accept Evan's overtures completely, knowing that their lives are far more complicated than he understands. Russ, meanwhile, continuing to dominate Candy's life, grows increasingly suspicious of Evan's presence. His rage against Evan grows, bordering on violence as he struggles to maintain his grip on Candy.

As Evan becomes more involved in Candy's life, his naive idea of love and relationships is confronted. He assumes that by giving her and her son everything, he can be rewarded with love in return, but things do not turn out that way. Candy, who is grateful for Evan's niceness, has to also consider her own history and future dreams. Meanwhile, Celeste herself in the path of heartbreak. The drama between Evan, Candy, and Russ reaches its climax, building to a series of emotional and physical confrontations that force each character to confront their flaws and limitations.

== Cast ==
- Evan Sneider as Evan
- Shannon Woodward as Candy
- Amanda Plummer as Celeste
- Jackson Rathbone as Russ
- Jerad Anderson as Kenny
- Darren MacDonald as Darren Jones
- Rachel Melvin as Actress on Television (voice)
- Blake Berris as Actor on Television (voice)
- Daniel J. Turnbull as Andy Jones
- Harrison Lees as Harrison
- Joseph Turnbull as Willie Jones
- Seth Chatfield as Jeremy
- Nate Krawshuk as Simon
- Carole Helman as Janis
- Craig Wesley Divino as Keg Master

== Production ==
=== Soundtrack ===
The film's original score features the work of The 100 Monkeys, a band that includes the film's stars Jackson Rathbone and Jerad Anderson.

== Release ==
Girlfriend premièred as an official selection at the 2010 Toronto International Film Festival, and then went on to play at the 2011 Festroia International Film Festival, 2011 Moscow International Film Festival, 2011 Galway Film Fleadh, and the 2011 Ghent International Film Festival. The film also won the Jury Prize for Best Narrative Feature and the Audience Award at the 2011 Woods Hole Film Festival, Best Feature Film and Best Director at the 2011 White Sands International Film Festival, and the Audience Award for Best US Narrative Feature (in a tie with Pariah) at the 2011 Mill Valley Film Festival.

In November 2011, Girlfriend was awarded the Audience Award at the 2011 IFP Gotham Independent Film Awards. This was the second year the Gotham Independent Film Audience Award was given out, 2010 being the first, when Waiting For Superman took the honor. The award kicked off the ceremony as the first of the evening, and was given to writer and director Justin Lerner and producers Jerad Anderson, Kristina Lauren Anderson, and Shaun O'Banion by actors Zachary Quinto and Sarah Paulson.

In April 2012, following the Gotham Independent Film Audience Award win, distributor Strand Releasing acquired the DVD and Video On Demand (VOD) rights to the film and released it on August 7, 2012.

== Reception ==
The film received mixed reviews from critics. On the review aggregator website Rotten Tomatoes, 50% of 10 critics' reviews are positive, with an average rating of 5.8/10. Metacritic, which uses a weighted average, assigned the film a score of 42 out of 100, based on 5 critics, indicating "mixed or average" reviews.

Ray Bennett from The Hollywood Reporter praised the film as "accomplished and tense" and wrote that first time actor Evan Sneider "handles scenes of tenderness, mystery, and anger with much skill. Shannon Woodward matches him." John Anderson of Variety gave a mixed review but praised the chemistry between Evan Sneider and Amanda Plummer and also called Plummer's performance "quite brilliant." Andrew O'Hehir wrote in Salon.com that the film "has tremendous heart and integrity" with an ending that is "gentle, optimistic, and just about right."

The New York Times gave a mixed review saying that some events in the film were "melodramatic" and, "while not necessarily predictable" were not a "very surprising chain of events". Slant Magazine gave the film a negative review with 1.5 stars out of a possible four and stated that "Girlfriend doesn't present us with anything life-affirming, challenging, or expectation-beating about a lead character with Down's. It's quite the opposite: The film at every turn wants us to feel increasingly worse for Evan" but admitted that the film seemed to "have its heart in the right place."

=== Awards and nominations ===
- 2011, won Gotham Independent Film Audience Award
- 2011, won Audience Award for 'Best U.S. Feature Film' at Mill Valley Film Festival (in a tie with Pariah)
- 2011, won Audience Award for 'Best of the Fest' at Woods Hole Film Festival
- 2011, won Jury Award for 'Best Narrative Feature Film' at Woods Hole Film Festival
- 2011, won 'Best Feature Film' at White Sands International Film Festival.
- 2011, won 'Best Director' (Justin Lerner) at White Sands International Film Festival.
