= Jackson Rathbone =

American actor & musician (born 1984)

- Rathbone at GalaxyCon St Louis in 2026
- Born: Monroe Jackson Rathbone V December 14, 1984 (age 41); Singapore
- Occupations: Actor; singer; musician
- Years active: 2005–present
- Spouse: Sheila Hafsadi (m. 2013)
- Children: 3
- Relatives: Monroe Jackson Rathbone II (great-grandfather)

Monroe Jackson Rathbone V (born December 14, 1984) is an American actor, singer, and musician best known for his roles as Jasper Hale in The Twilight Saga and Sokka in the live-action The Last Airbender (2010). From 2008 to 2012, he was the vocalist and occasional guitarist, bassist, drummer, and keyboardist of the funk rock band 100 Monkeys.

== Early life ==
Monroe Jackson Rathbone V was born in Singapore on December 14, 1984, the son of American parents Randee Lynn (née Brauner) and Monroe Jackson Rathbone IV. He has three sisters, including ceramic artist Kelly Rathbone. He is distantly related to Civil War general Stonewall Jackson and English actor Basil Rathbone, being descended from the Rathbone family of Liverpool. His great-grandfather, Monroe Jackson Rathbone II, was the chairman of Standard Oil, which later became Exxon. Because his father's job at Mobil Oil took the family to different places, he lived in Singapore, Norway, and Indonesia before settling in Midland, Texas.

Rathbone attended the Trinity School of Midland and started out in local theater with the Pickwick Players youth actors program, initially doing musical theater. For his junior and senior years of high school, he attended the Interlochen Arts Academy in Interlochen, Michigan, where he majored in acting. After graduation, he planned to further study acting at the Royal Conservatoire of Scotland in Glasgow, but was rejected and instead decided to move to Los Angeles to look for acting work.

== Career ==
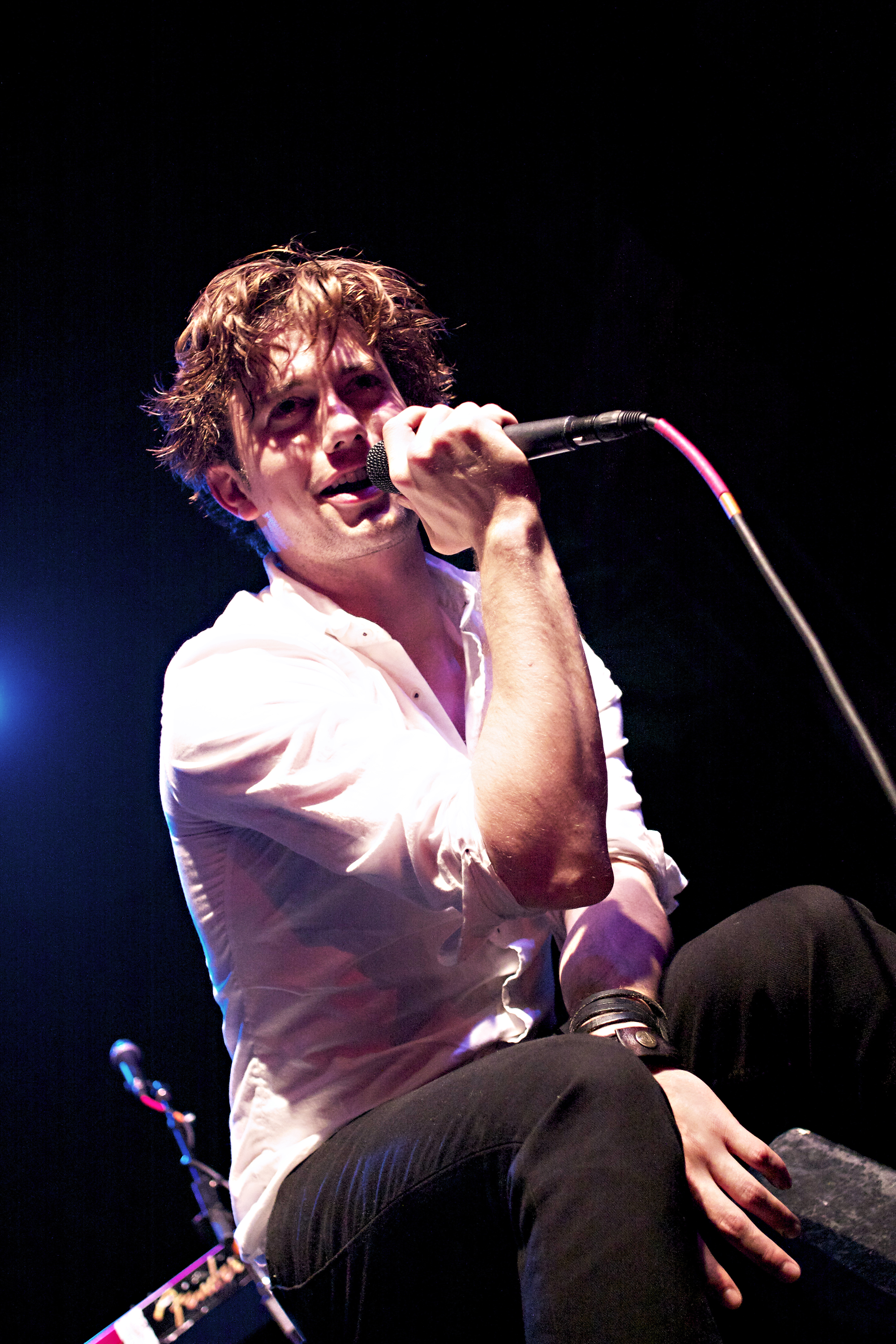
Rathbone performing with 100 Monkeys in 2011

After being in Los Angeles for a short time, Rathbone was cast in Disney 411, where he interviewed up-and-coming personalities like Hilary Duff and the sister duo Aly & AJ. He also had guest roles on The O.C. and Close to Home. His film roles include work in Molding Clay, Pray for Morning, and Travis and Henry. In 2005, he got the role of Nicholas Fiske in ABC Family's original series Beautiful People. In a 2008 interview, he stated it was his first leading role and was his most difficult role to fit into.

In 2008, he played Jasper Hale in the film Twilight, based on the best-selling novel by Stephenie Meyer. He reprised his role in the sequels to Twilight, The Twilight Saga: New Moon, The Twilight Saga: Eclipse and The Twilight Saga: Breaking Dawn – Part 1 and Part 2. In 2009, Rathbone played Jeremy in S. Darko. In addition to that role, he won kudos for his performance as a serial killer on Criminal Minds. Rathbone played the role of Sokka in The Last Airbender, a 2010 film based on the animated series.

Rathbone formerly performed in a funk band called 100 Monkeys with two friends whom he met in high school at Interlochen Arts Academy, Ben Graupner and Ben Johnson, as well as close friends Jerad Anderson and M. Lawrence Abrams ("Uncle Larry"). Jackson plays the guitar, bass, drums, keyboard, mandolin, trumpet, harmonica and is on vocals. The band released three albums in 2009. In December 2009, 100 Monkeys began a 100-city tour that took them to nearly every state in the US by mid-2010. The band continued to tour into 2011 to coincide with the release of their new album, Liquid Zoo, which was released in June. The band headed overseas for their first international dates in winter 2011.

Rathbone appeared in an episode of No Ordinary Family on November 9, 2010. In November 2010, it was reported he had been cast in the Warner Premiere and Dolphin Entertainment action comedy web series Aim High alongside Aimee Teegarden. The show in which he portrays Nick Green, a high school junior who's just starting a new school year as one of the country's 64 highly trained teenage operatives, premiered on October 18, 2011, on Facebook being the first "social series" ever created.

== Charity work ==
Rathbone is an honorary board member for Little Kids Rock, a national nonprofit that works to restore and revitalize music education in disadvantaged U.S. public schools. He has shown support for the organization in several ways, including donating a signed Twilight script for auction, visiting a Little Kids Rock classroom, and delivering instruments to students.

== Personal life ==
Rathbone married Sheila Hafsadi on September 29, 2013. Hafsadi is Iraqi-American. They reside in Alpharetta, Georgia, and have three children: a son born July 5, 2012, a daughter born May 31, 2016, and another son born January 5, 2020. His close friend and Twilight co-star Nikki Reed is the godmother of their elder son.

On September 18, 2014, Rathbone was on a JetBlue flight to Austin from Long Beach when its engine exploded. The plane returned to Long Beach for an emergency landing. There were four injured, but all passengers survived.

== Filmography ==
=== Film ===
Year	Title	Role	Notes	Ref
2005	River's End	Jimmy		
2006	Pray for Morning	Connor		
2007	Big Stan	Robbie the Hippie		
2008	Senior Skip Day	Snippy	Direct to video	
2008	Twilight	Jasper Hale		
2009	S. Darko	Jeremy Frame		
2009	Dread	Stephen Grace		
2009	Hurt	Conrad Coltrane		
2009	The Twilight Saga: New Moon	Jasper Hale		
2010	The Twilight Saga: Eclipse	Jasper Hale		
2010	The Last Airbender	Sokka		
2010	Girlfriend	Russ		
2010	Young Again	Adult Ethan	Short film	
2011	100 Monkeys: Modern Time	Red	Short film	
2011	The Twilight Saga: Breaking Dawn - Part 1	Jasper Hale		
2012	Zombie Hamlet	Shakespeare Purist	Uncredited	
2012	Cowgirls n' Angels	Justin Wood	Direct to video	
2012	The Twilight Saga: Breaking Dawn – Part 2	Jasper Hale		
2013	The Magic Bracelet	Geoff	Short film	
2013	Live at the Foxes Den	Bobby Kelly		
2014	City of Dead Men	Jacob		
2015	Pali Road	Neil Lang		
2016	100 Monkeys: The Fair	Musician	Short film	
2016	My Husband's Wife	Kyle		
2017	Horseshoe Theory	Bobbo		
2017	Justice	Thomas McCord		
2018	Samson	Rallah		
2019	The Wall of Mexico	Donovan Taylor		
2019	Do Not Reply	Brad		
2020	Until We Meet Again	Eddie Conway		
2021	Mixtape	Wes Kelley		
2022	Warhunt	Walsh		
2023	Condor's Nest	Fritz Ziegler		
2023	The Island	Phil		
2024	Books & Drinks	David Weiss		

=== Television ===
Year	Title	Role	Notes
2005	Beautiful People	Nicholas Fiske	Main role; 16 episodes
2005	Close to Home	Scott Fields	Episode: "Romeo and Juliet Murders"
2006	The O.C.	Justin Edwards	2 episodes
2007	The War at Home	Dylan	2 episodes
2007	The Valley of Light	Travis	Hallmark movie
2009	Criminal Minds	Adam Jackson	Episode: "Conflicted"
2010	No Ordinary Family	Trent Stafford	Episode: "No Ordinary Visitors"
2013	White Collar	Nate Osbourne	Episode: "Shoot the Moon"
2013	Family Guy	Stanley Kowalski	Episode: "Brian’s Play"
2013	NTSF:SD:SUV::	Jesse James	Episode: "The Great Train Stoppery"
2013	Finding Carter	Jared Peters	12 episodes
2017	The Last Ship	Giorgio	8 episodes
2022	The Guardians of Justice	Blue Scream	

=== Web ===
Year	Title	Role	Notes
2011–2013	Aim High	Nick Green	16 episodes, also executive producer
