= Dark Night of the Scarecrow =

1981 American made-for-television slasher film

- DVD cover
- Genre: Horror
- Created by: J.D. Feigelson
- Teleplay by: J.D. Feigelson
- Story by: J.D. Feigelson; Butler Handcock
- Directed by: Frank De Felitta
- Starring: Charles Durning; Robert F. Lyons; Lane Smith; Tonya Crowe; Larry Drake; Jocelyn Brando
- Theme music composer: Glenn Paxton
- Country of origin: United States
- Original language: English

Production
- Executive producer: Joe Wizan
- Producer: Bobbi Frank
- Production location: Piru, California
- Cinematography: Vincent A. Martinelli (as Vincent Martinelli)
- Editor: Skip Lusk
- Running time: 96 minutes
- Production company: Wizan Productions

Original release
- Network: CBS
- Release: October 24, 1981

Dark Night of the Scarecrow is a 1981 American Southern Gothic supernatural horror film directed by veteran novelist Frank De Felitta from a script by J.D. Feigelson. Feigelson's intent had been to make an independent feature, but his script was bought by CBS to be produced as a television film; despite this, only minor changes were made to the original teleplay.

== Plot ==
In a small town in the Deep South, the friendship between Charles Eliot "Bubba" Ritter, a large but gentle mentally challenged man, and young Marylee Williams angers some of the townspeople, especially brooding, mean-spirited postal worker Otis Hazelrigg. When Marylee is mauled by a vicious dog, Hazelrigg, promptly assuming that Bubba is responsible, forms a lynch mob with three friends: gas station attendant Skeeter Norris and farmer-cousins Philby and Harliss Hocker. Bubba's mother disguises him as a scarecrow and posts him in a nearby field, but the lynch party's bloodhounds sniff Bubba out and the helpless Bubba is gunned down by all four vigilantes. When they learn afterwards that Marylee is in fact alive thanks to Bubba rescuing her, Hazelrigg places a pitchfork in Bubba's lifeless hands to make it appear as if he were attacking them. When brought to trial, the vigilantes are subsequently released because of lack of evidence against them (and blatant perjury by Hazelrigg).

Marylee recovers from the attack, sneaks out of her room at night and goes over to the Ritter house looking for Bubba. Mrs. Ritter, unable to bring herself to tell Marylee the truth, instead tells her that Bubba has gone away. Marylee runs out of the house to look for Bubba. Mrs. Ritter goes after her and finds her sitting under the stake where Bubba had been killed, singing a favorite song of hers and Bubba's. Marylee calmly tells Mrs. Ritter that Bubba is not gone, only "playing the hiding game."

Some time later, Harliss finds a scarecrow in his field like the one Bubba was disguised as, with no indication as to who put it there. Hazelrigg suspects Sam Willock, the district attorney, of putting it there to rattle them and tells the others to keep calm and do nothing. That evening, Harliss returns home to find the scarecrow gone. Hearing noise in his barn, he investigates. While he is checking the loft, suspecting that Sam is hiding in the barn, the wood chipper below starts up again of its own accord; startled, he loses his balance, falls out of the loft into the machine and is killed.

Learning of Harliss' death, Hazelrigg, Philby and Skeeter suspect that it wasn't an accident, and that night find that the wood chipper had not run out of gasoline after Harliss had been killed but had been switched off. The next day, Hazelrigg obliquely accuses Mrs. Ritter of having engineered this supposed "accident" and implies that, with Harliss dead, Bubba has been suitably avenged, "a life for a life." She denies involvement, but says that other agencies will avenge her son, also implying that Hazelrigg is a pedophile because of his intense interest in Marylee. The scarecrow soon reappears, this time in Philby's field.

At the local church's Halloween party that night while playing hide-and-seek with the other children, Marylee is confronted by Hazelrigg, who tries to get her to tell him that Mrs. Ritter is behind the recent events. Instead, she tells him that she knows what he and his friends did to Bubba and runs from him. Hazelrigg chases after her, but is stopped by a security guard. Philby tells Hazelrigg about the scarecrow's appearance, but when Hazelrigg and the others go to Philby's field, the scarecrow has disappeared. Later that same night, Hazelrigg breaks into Mrs. Ritter's house to make her stop her supposed plot, but frightens her so badly by his violent appearance that she suffers a fatal heart attack. To cover his tracks, Hazelrigg starts a gas leak, resulting in an explosion that destroys the house. While everyone else believes the explosion was an accident, the district attorney is suspicious.

The next night, Philby is disturbed by a commotion in his hog pen; while checking it out, mysterious occurrences make him panic and try to flee in his car, which refuses to start. He is pursued across his property and hides in a grain silo, shutting the door behind him. A conveyor belt feeding into the silo is switched on, and Philby, unable to open the now-locked door of the silo, is buried under the resulting avalanche of grain and suffocates.

The next day, when Hazelrigg tells him of Philby's death, Skeeter is ready to turn himself in, but Hazelrigg is now convinced that Bubba is still alive and responsible for the recent occurrences. That night, he and Skeeter dig up Bubba's grave, supposedly to prove Hazelrigg's claim that the coffin is empty; Skeeter opens the coffin to reveal that the corpse is in fact still there and in panic tries to flee. Hazelrigg chases after Skeeter and stops him; they return to the grave to refill it, but while Skeeter is down in the grave closing the coffin lid, Hazelrigg smashes in Skeeter's skull with a shovel and fills in the grave with Skeeter in it.

Driving home in an intoxicated state, Hazelrigg sees Marylee alone in the middle of the road. Pursuing her, he crashes his van and chases her on foot into a pumpkin patch. Catching up with her, he accuses her of masterminding the murders. A plowing machine nearby starts up of its own accord, and Hazelrigg flees as the machine pursues him. Running blindly through the field, now thinking Sam is in the machine, the terrified Hazelrigg runs headlong into the scarecrow, which is now holding the pitchfork that had been planted on Bubba's corpse, and impales himself on the tines. Mortally wounded, Hazelrigg, realizing the scarecrow was, in fact, behind the strange occurrences and murders, collapses and dies. Marylee, hiding in the pumpkin patch, hears footsteps approaching; she looks up to see the scarecrow looking down at her and smiles. It bends down, presenting her with a flower, and she says "Thank you, Bubba.", revealing Bubba's spirit returned from death and possessed the scarecrow to enact revenge on his killers. Marylee then makes plans for the next day to teach Bubba a new game.

== Cast ==
- Charles Durning as Otis P. Hazelrigg
- Robert F. Lyons as Skeeter Norris
- Claude Earl Jones as Philby
- Lane Smith as Harliss Hocker
- Tonya Crowe as Marylee Williams
- Larry Drake as Charles Elliot "Bubba" Ritter
- Jocelyn Brando as Mrs. Ritter
- Tom Taylor as D.A. Sam Willock
- Richard McKenzie as Judge Henry
- Ivy Jones as Mrs. Willams
- James Tartan as Frank Williams (as Jim Tartan)
- Ed Call as Defense Attorney
- Alice Nunn as Mrs. Bunch
- John Steadman as Mr. Loomis
- David Adams as Deputy
- Ivy Bethune as Lady
- Dennis Robertson as Ray
- Jetta Scelza as Mrs. Whimberly
- Modi Frank as Waitress
- Jacqueline Scott as Mrs. Hocker [uncredited]

== Production ==
Dark Night of the Scarecrow was shot in 17 days (the original schedule called for 18 days, but a fire cost one shooting day), and all of the nocturnal scenes were actually shot at night.

Locations in Piru, California were used as primary locations, including 652 N. Main Street (Hazelrigg's post office), 699 Via Eustero (Skeeter's gas station), Center Street & Main Street (a cafe/bar), and 691 Main Street (the boarding house where Hazelrigg lived).

== Release ==
Dark Night of the Scarecrow premiered on CBS on October 24, 1981. It was later screened on 29 April 2010 as part of the Texas Frightmare Weekend.

== Home media ==
The film was released on VHS by Key Video in the mid-1980s.

The film was later released on DVD by VCI Entertainment on September 28, 2010 and on Blu-ray for the first time on October 11, 2011. VCI re-released the film on DVD on September 11, 2012. It was later released on Ultra HD Blu-ray in 2024 by VCI Entertainment.

== Reception ==
Rotten Tomatoes gives the film a 63% score based on reviews from 8 critics. Dread Central gave the film a score of 4.5 out of 5, calling it "a spooky masterpiece"; praising the film's atmosphere, characters, and subtlety. Justin Kerswell from Hysteria Lives! awarded the film 4/5 stars, calling it "a slow burning, fantastically creepy small screen tale". In his review, Kerswell praised the film's ambiguity, writing, "At times it's so understated, so well constructed, we are as unsure as the characters as to whether there really is something out there lurking in the dark or, perhaps, their growing paranoia has finally got the better of them." Angel Van Croft from HorrorNews.net gave the film a positive review, calling it "a well made movie with great acting, directing, and plenty of spooky atmosphere." Cameron McGaughy from DVD Talk offered the film similar praise, writing, "Dark Night of the Scarecrow isn't just one of the best made-for-television films ever made, it's one of the best horror films of all time... Utilizing masterful performances, locations, shots and sounds, it's a simple and subtly scary effort that relies on restraint. It stands the test of time and features an iconic image of evil that has never been more powerful, making this a classic steeped in frightful fall ambience, colors and imagery." Andrew Smith from Popcorn Pictures commended the film's well-rounded characters, cinematography, and "unsettling vibe"; stating that the film was "proof that even TV movies can be effective if the makers are intent on producing something more than standard".

The film was not without its detractors. Scott Weinberg from eFilmCritic.com awarded the film 2/5 stars, calling it "laughable junk", and criticized Durning's casting as the main villain.

== Legacy ==
Aaron Crowell, Managing Editor for HorrorHound Magazine, wrote: "With its 1981 release Dark Night of the Scarecrow was the first feature length horror film with a scarecrow as its centerpiece. In the intervening years many have copied this image, but with Dark Night of the Scarecrow writer J. D. Feigelson is credited as creator of the entire 'Killer Scarecrow' horror film subgenre".

A direct-to-video sequel, Dark Night of the Scarecrow 2, written and directed by J.D. Feigelson and starring Amber Wedding, Carol Dines, Adam Snyder, Tim Gooch and Mike VanZant, which takes place 40 years after the events of the original film, was released in 2022 on both DVD and Blu-ray by VCI Entertainment.

Vince Gilligan, the creator of Breaking Bad, credits a scene in this film with the inspiration for a visual transition shown in the Season 4 episode "Box Cutter."

== See also ==
- List of films set around Halloween
