= Shannon Woodward =

American actress

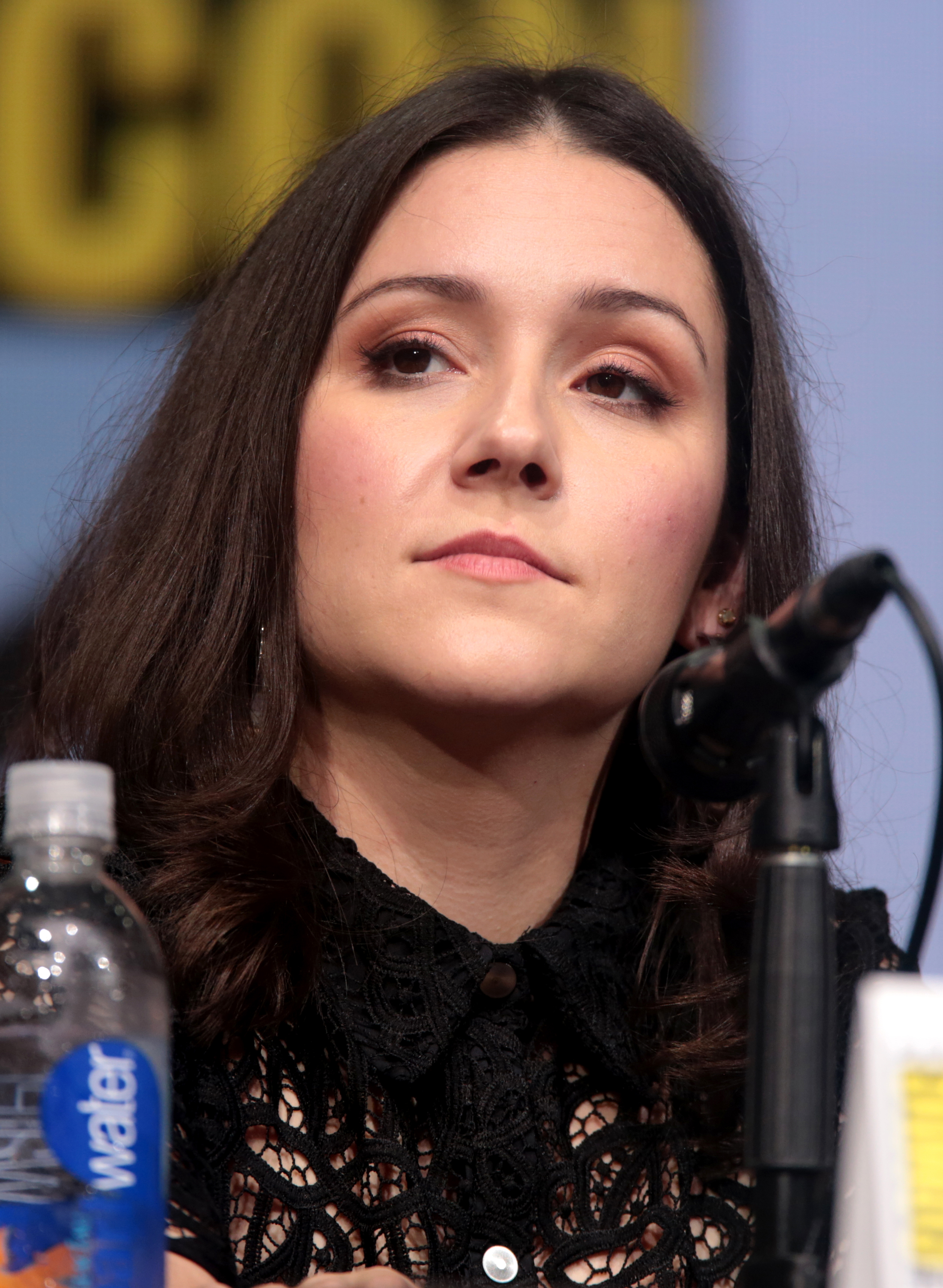
- Woodward in July 2017
- Occupation: Actress
- Years active: 1991–present

Shannon Woodward is an American actress. She is best known for her roles as Sabrina Collins on the Fox sitcom Raising Hope (2010–2014), Elsie Hughes on the HBO science-fiction thriller series Westworld (2016–2018), and the voice of Dina in the video game The Last of Us Part II (2020), for which she received a BAFTA Award for Performer in a Supporting Role nomination at the 17th British Academy Games Awards.

== Career ==
Woodward's first on-screen acting job came in 1991 when she played the occasionally recurring role of Missy on Nickelodeon's television series Clarissa Explains It All. She reprised this role twice during the show's five seasons. Woodward next appeared in made-for-television films: Family Reunion: A Relative Nightmare (1995) and Tornado! (1996). In 1997, she played an uncredited role in the CBS miniseries True Women.

Between 2000 and 2007, Woodward played a number of minor roles in various television shows including The Drew Carey Show, Grounded for Life, Malcolm in the Middle, Crossing Jordan, Without a Trace, Psych, and Boston Public.

Woodward's big-screen debut came in 2005, when she played Emma Sharp, the daughter of a Texas Ranger assigned to protect a group of cheerleaders who witnessed a murder, in the action comedy Man of the House.

In 2007, Woodward got her big break in the series The Riches, which aired for two seasons (2007–2008) on cable network FX. She played the role of Di Di Malloy, the teen daughter and middle child in an American family of Irish Travellers. After The Riches ended, Woodward played the role of Leah in the film The Haunting of Molly Hartley.

Woodward shot the 2009 pilot Limelight, about a New York City school for performing arts, but the series was not picked up. That same year, Woodward had a recurring role on the final season of NBC's ER, as Kelly Taggart, the younger sister of nurse Samantha "Sam" Taggart. She also starred in another teen thriller, The Shortcut.

In 2010, Woodward starred in the independent drama Girlfriend. She also played the lead character in the 2015 ensemble comedy-drama The Breakup Girl.

From September 2010 to April 2014, Woodward had a starring role in the FOX sitcom Raising Hope, playing Sabrina Collins, a grocery store checkout clerk who is the love interest of the series lead.

Woodward appeared in her friend Katy Perry's music video "Hot n Cold" and had a cameo role in Perry's documentary/concert film Katy Perry: Part of Me. Perry, in turn, guest-starred in a season two episode of Raising Hope.

Woodward played Lois in the 2017 film All Nighter. She was a regular in two seasons of HBO series Westworld as computer programmer Elsie Hughes.

It was announced in April 2017 that Woodward would appear in the video game The Last of Us Part II, which was released on June 19, 2020. Woodward played Dina, the main character Ellie's friend and love interest.

== Personal life ==
Woodward came out as queer in February 2021. In 2024, Woodward shared via Instagram that she was in a relationship with Ellison Barber, host of Netflix’s true crime video podcast Allegedly.

== Filmography ==
=== Film ===
Year	Title	Role	Notes
2005	Man of the House	Emma Sharp	
2005	The Quiet	Fiona	
2007	Sunny & Share Love You	Girl on the Street	
2007	The Comebacks	Emily	
2008	The Haunting of Molly Hartley	Leah	
2009	The Shortcut	Lisa	
2010	Girlfriend	Candy	
2012	Katy Perry: Part of Me	Herself	
2013	Adult World	Candace	
2014	Search Party	Tracy	
2014	You Me & Her	Anna	Short film
2015	The Breakup Girl	Claire Baker	
2016	The Veil	Jill	
2017	All Nighter	Lois	
2017	Anna & The Asteroid	Anna	Short film
2019	Jake and Kyle Get Wedding Dates	Tania Wilde	Voice, direct-to-video
2019	Ode to Joy	Liza	
2021	Happily	Carla	
2023	Jagged Mind	Alex	
2025	The Testament of Ann Lee	Mrs. Cunningham	

=== Television ===
Year	Title	Role	Notes
1991–1994	Clarissa Explains It All	Missy / Alien 3	3 episodes
1995	Family Reunion: A Relative Nightmare	Leigh Dooley	Television film
1996	Tornado!	Lucy	Television film
1997	True Women	Young Cherokee Woods (age 13)	Television film
2000	The Drew Carey Show	Girl in Cafeteria	Episode: "Be Drew to Your School"
2001	Crossing Jordan	Lucy	Episode: Pilot; uncredited
2001	Malcolm in the Middle	Tammy	Episode: "Houseboat"
2001–2002	Grounded for Life	Kristina	3 episodes
2002	Greetings from Tucson	Chrissy	Episode: "Popularity"
2003	Without a Trace	Vicki Johnson	Episode: "Sons and Daughters"
2003	Boston Public	Allison / Marianne Karr	2 episodes
2004	Medical Investigation	Danielle Johnson	Episode: "The Unclean"
2005	Quintuplets	Bailey	Episode: "Chutes and Letters"
2006	Cold Case	Raquel Montero (1994)	Episode: "Detention"
2007	Psych	Alice Bundy	Episode: "Scary Sherry: Bianca's Toast"
2007	Law & Order: Special Victims Unit	Cecilia Strayer	Episode: "Svengali"
2007–2008	The Riches	Di Di Malloy	Main role
2009	Limelight	Zoe Green	Television film
2009	Criminal Minds	Linda Jones	Episode: "Zoe's Reprise"
2009	ER	Kelly Taggart	2 episodes
2010–2014	Raising Hope	Sabrina Collins	Main Role
2016–2018	Westworld	Elsie Hughes	20 episodes
2017	The Guest Book	Marla	Episode: "Story Seven"
2017	Last Week Tonight with John Oliver	Female Forensic Scientist	Episode: "Forensic Science"
2018	Portlandia	Shannon	Episode: "Open Relationship"
2018	Drunk History	Ida Tarbell	Episode: "Underdogs"
2018–2019	An Emmy for Megan	Herself	2 episodes
2020	Robot Chicken	Barbara "Barb" Holland, Ariel	Voice, episode: "Gracie Purgatory in: That's How You Get Hemorrhoids"
2020	Animal Talking with Gary Whitta	Herself	Episode: "Selena Gomez, Cory Barlog, Laura Bailey, Ashley Johnson, Shannon Woodward"
2021	Mr. Corman	Elizabeth Corman	2 episodes
2023	The Morning Show	Jess Bennett	1 episode
2023	Scott Pilgrim Takes Off	Hollie Hawkes (Voice)	Episode: "Ramona Rents a Video"
2025	Common Side Effects	Amelia / Diane (voice)	Recurring cast member

=== Music videos ===
Year	Title	Artist	Role	Notes
2008	"Hot n Cold"	Katy Perry	Bridesmaid	
2013	"Kangaroo Court"	Capital Cities	Poodle	

=== Video games ===
Year	Title	Role	Notes
2020	The Last of Us Part II	Dina	Motion capture & voice Nominated—2020 British Academy Games Awards for Performer in a Supporting Role
2024	Riven	Ti'ana	Motion capture & voice
