= Getting Straight =

1970 US comedy-drama film by Richard Rush

- Theatrical release poster
- Directed by: Richard Rush
- Screenplay by: Robert Kaufman
- Based on: Getting Straight; 1967 novel by Ken Kolb
- Produced by: Richard Rush
- Starring: Elliott Gould; Candice Bergen
- Cinematography: László Kovács
- Edited by: Maury Winetrobe
- Music by: Ronald Stein
- Distributed by: Columbia Pictures
- Release date: May 13, 1970 (U.S.)
- Running time: 124 mins
- Country: United States
- Language: English
- Box office: $13,300,000

Getting Straight (released overseas as L' Impossibilita' di Essere Normale, translation: The Impossibility of Being Normal) is a 1970 American satirical and romantic comedy-drama motion picture directed by Richard Rush, released by Columbia Pictures.

The story centers upon student politics, protest, and relationships during the height of the counterculture era at a US university amid the turbulent times around the late 1960s, seen through the eyes of non-conformist graduate student Harry Bailey (Elliott Gould). Also featured in the cast were Candice Bergen as Bailey's girlfriend, Jeff Corey as Bailey's professor, Robert F. Lyons as his draft-avoiding friend Nick, and Harrison Ford as a fellow teaching student and his girlfriend's neighbor.

Getting Straight was released during an era of change and unrest in the United States in the late 1960s and early '70s, and was in a long line of films that dealt with these themes. Other films of this period with similar themes were Medium Cool (1969), R. P. M. (1970), and The Strawberry Statement (1970).

== Plot ==
Harry Bailey, a former student activist, Vietnam War veteran, and graduate student, returns to college to complete a master's degree so he can become a teacher. He does his best to avoid the increasing student unrest that has surfaced at his university and in the country as a whole. However, he finds this difficult as his girlfriend, Jan, is a leader in these protests.

Over time, student demonstrations bring police to the campus to quell the unrest, and the ensuing clashes lead to a heavy police presence. Harry is forced to question his changing values. At the height of the rioting, he comes to agree with Jan that "getting straight" is more important than the unquestioning acceptance of the educational establishment.

== Cast ==
- Elliott Gould as Harry Bailey
- Candice Bergen as Jan
- Robert F. Lyons as Nick
- Jeff Corey as Dr. Willhunt
- Max Julien as Ellis
- Cecil Kellaway as Dr. Kasper
- Jon Lormer as Vandenburg
- Leonard Stone as Lysander
- William Bramley as Wade Linden
- Jeannie Berlin as Judy Kramer
- John Rubinstein as Herbert
- Richard Anders as Dr. Greengrass
- Brenda Sykes as Luan
- Jenny Sullivan as Sheila
- Gregory Sierra as Garcia
- Billie Bird as Landlady
- Harrison Ford as Jake
- Elizabeth Lane as Alice Linden
- Hilary Thompson as Cynthia (credited as Hilarie Thompson)
- Irene Tedrow as Mrs. Stebbins

== Production ==
=== Original novel ===
In February 1967, Mike Frankovich, head of Columbia Pictures, announced he had bought the rights to the novel Getting Straight by Ken Kolb.

Richard Rush described the original novel as "a nice novel about a graduate student taking his orals to get his teaching credentials. The administration of the college is like a medieval torture chamber, and the oral exam is like the Salem witch trials. He barely escapes with his sanity."

The novel was published in early 1968. The Chicago Tribune called the book "very funny".

=== Richard Rush ===
Director Richard Rush had impressed with his AIP films Hells Angels on Wheels (1967) and Psych-Out (1968) and was signed to an independent deal with Columbia. They offered the book to him, and he said he would do it if they let him make a contemporary film about kids at college rebelling against the draft and the war. He wrote a treatment and they eventually agreed. Rush's signing was announced in June 1968.

"To me the whole 'revolution' is not a political revolution but a personal one", he said. "It is the result of the inability of an entire generation on a personal, individual level to accept the disparities in the morality at the foundation of our society."

Rush says the studio gave him a list of writers to do a screenplay and he picked one, but was not happy with the result. Rush then hired someone not on the list, Robert Kaufman, who Rush had known at AIP. Rush called Kaufman "a brilliant, vicious intellectual, total amoral comic. He could make me laugh. He was a bright, funny man." Kaufman signed in December 1968.

"All my films are about commitment", said Kaufman later. "Somehow. The moral was, love is better with a monster who'll make a commitment than with a nebbish who won't. "

Rush says Kolb later did some work on the script. "It was risky material because the war was still going on and students were at the barricades and Hollywood movies weren’t really addressing this stuff yet head-on", Rush says.

=== Casting ===
Elliott Gould had just made M*A*S*H and was going to make Move when Columbia came to him with Getting Straight. "Columbia said if I didn't take the part they'd drop it", he said. "I was the only actor they'd go with. I was never so flattered in my life."

Gould says when he met Rush the director asked him, "'Can you get angry?' Because I had never been in the Army, nor had I ever gone to college, nor am I an angry person. I said, 'I believe I can show you some passion and emotion for this character.' "

Gould said "it's an almost classical part, a fantastic character."

Rush had made several movies with Jack Nicholson and offered him a role but the actor had to decline when deluged with offers post-Easy Rider. "I guess I've lost my standing with him", said Nicholson of the director.

Candice Bergen was cast in July 1969.

Harrison Ford had been under contract to Columbia, which had expired. However he was brought back to the studio for a role in this film.

Richard Rush signed Max Julien to a three-picture contract over two years.

=== Filming ===
Filming started July 7, 1969 in Eugene, Oregon, with Lane Community College standing in for the fictional university.

Rush later said Gould "had complete abandon. Elliott did a hell of a job." He said the actor was "incredibly inventive, tremendously flexible" and that Bergen was "a genuine dedicated, bright human being" who made "an extraordinary breakthrough."

Candice Bergen said the film took her career in "a new direction... my first experience with democratic, communal movie making."

When filming ended Kaufman wrote "we have sought to record, with a sense of humor, the reality of today's student protest, campus riots, and establishment reprisals. We will undoubtedly be charged with sensationalism but anything less than a straightforward depiction of these events would be ludicrously false."

Rush says when he got to the location he saw it was full of glass walls. "We had to suit what was happening inside with what was happening outside, and it opened up enormous opportunities", he said. "Also, I'd never shot a riot before with tear gas and policemen beating up people. When I suddenly had the equipment to do that, with the tear gas and the paddy wagons and the helicopters, it became a different version of the movie than I had originally pictured in my head as I had written it."

Rush used a lot of rack focus on the film. He later said he did this because he felt the script was very verbal and needed to "make it visual."

Rush says "We shot the film on a very long lens, so we could peer inside and outside of the classrooms on the campus to gather relevant information, and get interesting angles in order to create a mood of tension or unpredictability. And this is where we really started using the rack focus technique. This type of shooting draws the viewer into the shot on an emotional level."

== Reception ==
=== Box office ===
The film grossed $13.3 million at the domestic box office, earning $5.1 million in US theatrical rentals. It was the 21st highest-grossing film of 1970.

The film was one of a number of movies made about campus unrest at this time, others including The Strawberry Statement, The Magic Garden of Stanley Sweetheart, The Pursuit of Happiness, The Revolutionary, Up in the Cellar, Zabriskie Point and RPM. Getting Straight was the only one that was commercially successful.

"We were one of Columbia's biggest grossers of the year, and critics were very supportive", says Rush.

=== Critical reaction ===
Howard Thompson of The New York Times wrote, "A brilliant, mercurial performance by Elliott Gould steadies and vivifies but cannot save 'Getting Straight' ... A serious-minded, freewheeling comedy, pivoting on student unrest and rebellion on the contemporary campus scene, succumbs to theatrics and, structurally, the very conventions it deplores." Also writing in The New York Times, Dwight Macdonald called it "a bad movie" that "reminds me of a grunt-and-groan wrestling match that tries by overemphasis to make the customers forget it's fixed."

However, Arthur D. Murphy of Variety declared, "'Getting Straight' is an outstanding film. It is a comprehensive, cynical, sympathetic, flip, touching and hilarious story of the middle generation—those millions who are a bit too old for protest, a bit too young for repression. Elliott Gould's third smash performance in a year, herein as a disenchanted college student-teacher, makes him an undeniable screen star. Ditto for Candice Bergen, in a role that at last befits both her dramatic and physical talents."

Gene Siskel of the Chicago Tribune gave the film one-and-a-half stars out of four and wrote that it "fails because no meaningful conflict is established until late in the film", and that every character except Bergen's was "one-dimensional, a thin symbol to be placed wherever the box office dictates." Gary Arnold of The Washington Post called the film a "thoroughly equivocal mishmash" that "politicizes everyone and everything. This includes the love affair, which is thwarted by some of the worst dialogue I've ever listened to." Richard Combs of The Monthly Film Bulletin wrote, "Perfectly maintaining the balance between acute exasperation and a vivid intellectual energy, Elliott Gould manages to endow Harry with something of the air of a prophet returned from the wilderness, certain of his personal truth although by no means certain of achieving it, and not to be goaded into becoming the spokesman for a new generation of icon levellers."

Leonard Maltin's movie guide awarded two-and-a-half stars out of four and noted that the film essentially was a "period piece" but that its "central issue of graduate student (Elliott) Gould choosing between academic double-talk and his beliefs remains relevant." Steven Scheuer, however, wrote that the film was reflective of "hippiedom alienation at its shallowest."

Stanley Kauffmann of The New Republic wrote- "Getting Straight is a very ambitious film that is too small for its britches".

John Calley of Warners wanted to hire Kaufman, Rush and Gould to make a film of Bruce Jay Friedman's Scuba Duba but no film resulted.

Rush wanted to follow the film with The Stunt Man, but that film was not made until 1980.

== See also ==
- List of American films of 1970

== Bibliography ==
- Greenspun, Roger (1970) Getting Straight New York Times, May 14, 1970. (accessed 9 July 2007)
- Maltin, Leonard (1991) Leonard Maltin's Movie and Video Guide 1992, Signet, New York.
- Scheuer, Steven H. (1990) Movies on TV and Videocassette, Bamtam Books, New York.
