= The Burning Dead =

- Film poster
- Directed by: Rene Perez
- Written by: Jeff Miller; Jason Ancona
- Produced by: Jeff Miller; Jason Ancona
- Starring: Tom Downey; Moniqua Plante; Danny Trejo
- Cinematography: Rene Perez
- Edited by: Rene Perez
- Production companies: Millman Productions; Jason Ancona Productions
- Distributed by: Uncork'd Entertainment
- Release date: March 3, 2015
- Running time: 82 minutes
- Country: United States
- Language: English

The Burning Dead (also Volcano Zombies) is a 2015 American horror film directed by Rene Perez, written by Jeff Miller and Jason Ancona, and starring Tom Downey and Moniqa Plante.

== Plot ==
Long-dead cannibals are brought back to life when a volcano erupts. A sheriff and his daughter band together with several other survivors to defeat the lava-based zombies.

== Cast ==
- Tom Downey as Sheriff Denton
- Moniqua Plante as Mindy Roberts
- Nicole Cummins as Nicole Roberts
- Kevin Norman as Ryan Jacobs
- Kyle T. Heffner as Dr. Stevens
- Julia Lehman as Eve Jones
- Tom Nagel as Deputy Tisdale
- Adam Gregor as Ranger McGee
- Jenny Lin as Photographer
- Robert F. Lyons as Old Ben
- Danny Trejo as Night Wolf

== Production ==
Perez was attracted to the project due to his desire to work with producer Jeff Miller, and he was intrigued by the possibility of directing a campy horror film, which he had never done before. Plante said that she was drawn to the film based on the campy appeal of the script. Trejo was approached after the film had financing. Lehman was cast by co-producer Mike Sikes, who she had previously worked with in Pretty Cool 2. She said that the actors had to take the story seriously despite its silliness in order to make the premise work.

Filming began around November 2013 and included Lassen Volcanic National Park among other locations. Post-production ended in September 2014. Perez estimated that it took 1.5 years between when the script was written and the film's release date.

== Release ==
The original title, Volcano Zombies, was changed to The Burning Dead for marketing reasons. Perez endorsed the change. Uncork'd Entertainment released The Burning Dead to video on demand on March 3, 2015. The DVD will be released on April 7, 2015.

== Reception ==
Dominic Cuthbert of Starburst rated it 4/10 stars and wrote that both the script and acting are terrible, but it could have been salvaged if Perez had not taken himself so seriously. Mark L. Miller of Ain't It Cool News called it an attempt to cash in the success of Sharknado, though it is even more nonsensical. Scott Foy of Dread Central rated it 1/5 stars and wrote that although The Asylum might not have made a good film with this premise, they could have done it with more flair. Ben Bussey of Brutal as Hell called it a "waste of time" that is full of filler. Michael DeFellipo of Horror Society rated it 6.8/10 and wrote, "By all means this movie isn't made to be taken seriously, so it does achieve its goal of being fun to watch. If you're a fan of SyFy Network Original Movies, then you'll get a kick out of The Burning Dead. Anyone else should probably avoid."
