= Pray for Morning =

Pray for Morning is a 2006 horror/thriller movie directed and written by Cartney Wearn.

== Plot ==
In 1984, a group of five high schoolers had broken into an abandoned hotel, as was tradition after graduation. They were all gruesomely murdered. At the insistence of one set of parents, the police brought in a psychic, as they could find no leads. The psychic said that the murderer was still in the hotel. The police searched but found no one. The psychic died in her sleep that night. The search was never continued, the murderer never found.

20 years later, six students had planned to enter the hotel. Two younger high school students found out that they were "up to something" and they "wanted in." The plan was, during the course of one night, to find all five rooms where the students were murdered. They find a severed hand in the first room and it unleashes a horrible curse. After the first two deaths, they find out that they need to find the other hand and the body and bury them together.

== Cast List ==
- Udo Kier as Edouard Leopold Edu
- Jonathon Trent as Jesse
- Jessica Stroup as Ashley
- Dennis Flanagan as Dylan
- Ashlee Turner as Lilly
- Jackson Rathbone as Connor
- Brandon Novitsky as Topher
- Kip Martain as Rand
- Rachel Veltri as Bunny
- Robert F. Lyons as William Proctor
- Peter Pasco as Robert

== Awards ==
Pray for Morning won one award at the Moondance International Film Festival in 2007. It won the Columbine Award. It was in the Film Score category, and Vincent Gillioz won.
