= Lilimae Clements =

- Knots Landing character
- Portrayed by: Julie Harris
- Duration: 1980–87
- First appearance: January 25, 1980 (Episode: Will the Circle Be Unbroken)
- Last appearance: November 19, 1987 (Episode: Flight of the Sunbirds)
- Created by: David Jacobs
In-universe information
- Occupation: Country Music singer
- Father: Joshua Patrick
- Mother: Aura Belle Wiley Patrick
- Sisters: Virginia Bullock, née Patrick; June Rush, née Patrick; Meg Patrick; Edna Patrick
- Husband: Jeremiah Clements (backstory); Jonathan J. Rush (common-law; backstory)
- Sons: Joshua Rush
- Daughters: Valene Ewing
- Grandchildren: Lucy Ewing; Betsy Ewing; Bobby Ewing II
- Aunts and uncles: Horace Patrick

Lilimae Clements (maiden name Patrick) is a fictional character from the long-running CBS soap opera, Knots Landing. She was played by Julie Harris between 1980 and 1987. Although not a series regular until season 4, Lilimae was created by producer David Jacobs as one of the series' earliest characters.

== Development ==
=== Casting ===
Harris was hired by Knots Landing in January 1980. She went on to play the character for seven years before exiting the show in 1987 as a result of budget cuts. The actress said in an interview with People magazine that she took the role because she didn't have anything to do at the time. "I had just been sick and got better." She noted that she enjoyed her time on Knots, playing a "second-rate Southern singer" appealed to her. In an interview with Jerry Buck of the Orlando Sentinel, Julie Harris said that she joined the show on advice from her agent, Ed Bondy.

== Storylines ==
Before her first appearance, a teenage Lilimae meets and marries a much older man named Jeremiah Clements (Don "Red" Barry) in Shula, Tennessee (a fictional community in real-life Johnson County). Shortly after the birth of their daughter, Valene, Lilimae abandons her husband and daughter for long periods of time to pursue her singing career, a continual event for most of Valene's childhood. When Jeremiah dies, Lilimae moves then 11-year-old Valene firstly to live with her (Lilimae's) mother, and then with Lilimae's sister June. Lilimae later meets Reverend Jonathan Rush (Albert Salmi). After a brief romance, he asks her to marry him but she refuses to be tied down. After the birth of their son, Joshua, they live together for a year until Lilimae receives a career proposal and leaves her responsibilities again. While she is on tour, her daughter, Valene, comes looking for her in search of help. Valene is pursued by oil tycoon J.R. Ewing (Larry Hagman), who wants to take her baby, Lucy, but Lilimae refuses to let her in, saying that if the producer discovers that she is a grandmother, her career will be ruined. Val frantically tries to hide the baby, but J.R. eventually gets a hold of her, causing Val to be resentful of her mother.

In 1980, Lilimae learns of Val's remarriage to J.R.'s brother, Gary Ewing (Ted Shackelford). She decides to visit the two of them in Los Angeles, California, where she is met with her daughter's hostility towards her. After Val confronts her mother, she is able to move on and work things out. In 1981, Gary and Val see a newscast featuring Lilimae, which shows her stopping a thief. They portray her as being homeless and Valene invites her to stay with the two of them. The next day, Lilimae is arrested for shoplifting, but the judge says he'll give her a slide with six months probation if Val and Gary assume responsibility for her. Shortly after, Gary has an affair with their neighbor, Abby Cunningham (Donna Mills), which Lilimae learns of (she witnesses Abby and Gary exiting a hotel after a sexual tryst), and attempts to coerce Gary into ending the affair, without Val finding out, but Val and Gary's marriage eventually ends.

In season four, Lilimae befriends Chip Roberts (Michael Sabatino), who is handling the advertising campaign for Val's book Capricorn Crude, a loosely based narrative of the Ewing family. She soon learns that Chip murdered a popular singer, Ciji Dunne (Lisa Hartman-Black), and has been fooling the entire cul-de-sac into believing his lies. In a revenge attempt, Lilimae decides to run Chip over with her car. Valene is forced to admit her into a psychiatric hospital, rather than going to jail. Upon returning home, Lilimae meets Val's new boyfriend, Ben Gibson. She makes her dislike of Ben widely known. In the sixth season, Valene finds out that she's pregnant with twins, giving Lilimae a second chance to be a grandmother. Her abandoned son, Joshua Rush (Alec Baldwin), shows up at their doorstep looking for his mother. After some persuasion by Val, Lilimae welcomes him into the family. Joshua settles into life on the cul-de-sac and marries Cathy Geary, a look-alike of Ciji.

Lilimae soon learns that Joshua is beating his wife and is in need of help. She discovers both Cathy and Joshua on top of a building, where Joshua is attempting to kill Cathy. Lilimae begins shouting at him and Joshua trips and falls over the edge. He is pronounced dead instantly. She goes through an immense period of mourning before finally moving on from Joshua's death and being a grandmother to Bobby and Betsy. In season nine, she meets Al Baker (Red Buttons), an acquaintance of neighbor Mack MacKenzie (Kevin Dobson). They eventually fall in love, but Lilimae refuses to marry him. They buy a camper and leave the cul-de-sac together to travel the country.

== Reception ==
John J. O'Connor of The New York Times wrote an article in 1995 on Harris, where he mentioned her seven years on the program. He said: "In a television landscape littered with pretty young things being adolescently silly, a Julie Harris performance can be thoroughly invigorating. Although most viewers will probably remember Ms. Harris for her seven years as Lilimae Clements on Knots Landing, theatergoers know better."
