= Tonya Crowe =

American actress

- Born: Los Angeles, California, U.S
- Occupation: Actress
- Years active: 1976—present

Tonya Crowe is an American actress, best-known for her role as Olivia Cunningham in the CBS prime time soap opera, Knots Landing.

== Life and career ==
Crowe was born in Los Angeles, California, a daughter of school principal and a real estate agent. She is best known for playing Olivia Cunningham, the daughter of Donna Mills' Abby Cunningham, in the CBS prime time soap opera, Knots Landing, a role she played from 1980 to 1990 as well as in the reunion miniseries Knots Landing: Back to the Cul-de-Sac (1997). She received three Soap Opera Digest Awards for Outstanding Actress in a Supporting Role: Prime Time, as well as Young Artist Award for Best Young Actress in a Nighttime Drama Series. Crowe received ten total Young Artist Award nominations during the 1980s for her television performances.

Crowe also had a recurring role on the ABC sitcom Who's the Boss?, and guest starred on CHiPs, Trapper John, M.D. and Seven Brides for Seven Brothers. Since leaving television, Crowe went to college and graduated from University of California, Los Angeles. She starred and wrote 2001 independent film Only in Venice.

== Filmography ==
Year	Title	Role	Notes
1976	Charlie's Angels	Young Kelly	Episode: "The Seance
1979	Women in White	Cynthia Rayburn	Miniseries
1979	The Cracker Factory	Jenny Barrett	Televisio film
1979	The Bad News Bears	Wendi	Episode: "First Base"
1980	Mother and Daughter: The Loving War	Renie, age 8	Televisio film
1980	CHiPs	Marla	Episode: "Tow Truck Lady"
1980	The Memory of Eva Ryker	Little Eva	Televisio film
1980	Joshua's World	Thorpe Torrance	Television pilot Nominated — Young Artist Award for Best Young Actress - TV Special
1980—1990	Knots Landing	Olivia Cunningham Dyer	Series regular, 153 episodes Young Artist Award for Best Young Actress in a Nighttime Drama Series (1989); Soap Opera Digest Award for Outstanding Actress in a Supporting Role: Prime Time (1988-1990); Nominated — Soap Opera Digest Award for Outstanding Youth Actor/Actress on a Daytime or Prime Time Serial (1986); Nominated — Young Artist Award for Best Young Actress in a Drama Series (1983–84); Nominated — Young Artist Award for Best Young Supporting Actress in a Daytime or Nighttime Drama (1985); Nominated — Young Artist Award for Best Young Female Superstar in Television (1988); Nominated — Young Artist Award for Best Performance by a Young Actress in a Long Running Series Comedy or Drama (1987)
1981	Trapper John, M.D.	Jenny	Episode: "Finders Keepers"
1981	Dark Night of the Scarecrow	Marylee Williams	Television film Nominated — Young Artist Award for Best Young Actress in a Television Special
1982	Seven Brides for Seven Brothers	B.J. Palmer	Episode: "Christmas Song"
1985	Call to Glory	Girl	Episodes: "JFK: Part 1" and "JFK: Part 1"
1985-1986	Who's the Boss?	Robin Fraser	3 episodes Nominated — Young Artist Award for Best Performance by a Young Actress, Guest Starring in a Television, Comedy or Drama Series
1988	A Family Again	Lindsay Foster	Television film Nominated — Young Artist Award for Best Young Actress in a Special, Pilot, Movie of the Week or Mini-Series
1997	Knots Landing: Back to the Cul-de-Sac	Olivia Cunningham Dyer	Miniseries
1997	Soldier of Fortune, Inc.	EMT	Episode: "Genesis"
2001	Only in Venice	Guinevere	Also writer
