= Horseshoe Theory =

2017 American short romantic comedy film

- Directed by: Jonathan Daniel Brown
- Written by: Jonathan Daniel Brown; Travis Harrington
- Produced by: Joe Toronto; Jon Sautter; Travis Harrington
- Starring: Amir Malaklou; Jackson Rathbone
- Cinematography: Leonidas Jaramillo
- Edited by: Jon Sautter
- Music by: Chris Gilbreath; Jackson Rathbone; Martin Noakes
- Release date: January 21, 2017 (Slamdance)
- Running time: 12 minutes
- Country: United States
- Language: English

Horseshoe Theory is a 2017 American short romantic comedy film written and directed by Jonathan Daniel Brown, co-written by Travis Harrington and produced by Joe Toronto, Jon Sautter and Travis Harrington. The film premiered at the 2017 Slamdance Film Festival in Park City, Utah where it won a special jury award.

The title is a reference to the horseshoe theory in politics.

== Plot ==
After arranging a weapons deal over the internet, a white supremacist named Bobbo and a jihadist named Abdul meet behind a diner. Over the course of an evening, they both discover they have more in common than either of the two could have realized.

== Cast ==
- Jackson Rathbone as Bobbo
- Amir Malaklou as Abdul
- Lily Mae Harrington as Waitress
- Travis Harrington as Radio Host

== Filming ==
The filming of Horseshoe Theory took place in Mojave, California, and Tarzana, Los Angeles, over two days. The film was shot digitally using the Red Dragon camera. The film's poster was designed by Kari Kilpela.

== Release ==
On January 21, 2017, Horseshoe Theory had its world premiere at the Slamdance Film Festival in Park City, Utah.

== Film festivals ==
Festival	Status	Screening dates	Awards and accolades	Filmmakers in attendance
Slamdance Film Festival	World premiere	January 21 and 23, 2017	Jury Honorable Mention Award	Jonathan Daniel Brown, Joe Toronto, Jon Sautter, Travis Harrington and Amir Malaklou
Cyberia		February 10, 2017	Official Selection	
ICE Film Festival	Ohio premiere	February 18, 2017	Official Selection	
Short.Sweet. Film Festival		March 3–5, 2017	Official Selection	
Brightside Tavern Shorts Fest	New Jersey premiere	March 3–5, 2017	Official Selection	
Fort Myers Film Festival		March 8–12, 2017	Best Short Film	
Humboldt Film Festival		April 19–22, 2017	People's Choice Award Winner	
Florida Film Festival	Florida premiere	April 21–30, 2017	Official Selection	
"Hang onto Your Shorts" Film Festival		April 21–23, 2017	Official Selection	
Riverside International Film Festival	California premiere	April 21–30, 2017	Official Selection	
SENE Film Festival	Rhode Island premiere	April 25–29, 2017	Official Selection	
Rainer Independent Film Festival	Washington premiere	May 19–21, 2017	Official Selection	
Mammoth Lakes Film Festival		May 28, 2017	Official Selection	Jonathan Daniel Brown, Joe Toronto and Travis Harrington
Pineapple Underground Film Festival	Hong Kong premiere	June 8–30, 2017	Official Selection	
