= Knots Landing =

American soap opera

- Logo used between the ninth and tenth seasons
- Genre: Soap opera
- Created by: David Jacobs
- Starring: James Houghton; Kim Lankford; Michele Lee; Constance McCashin; Don Murray; John Pleshette; Ted Shackelford; Joan Van Ark; Donna Mills; Julie Harris; Kevin Dobson; Claudia Lonow; Douglas Sheehan; William Devane; Lisa Hartman; Alec Baldwin; Teri Austin; Nicollette Sheridan; Patrick Petersen; Tonya Crowe; Michelle Phillips; Larry Riley; Stacy Galina; Kathleen Noone
- Theme music composer: Jerrold Immel
- Country of origin: United States
- Original language: English
- No. of seasons: 14
- No. of episodes: 344 (list of episodes)

Production
- Executive producers: Michael Filerman; David Jacobs
- Running time: 60 minutes
- Production companies: Roundelay Productions; Roundelay-MF Productions; Lorimar Productions; Lorimar-Telepictures; Lorimar Television

Original release
- Network: CBS
- Release: December 27, 1979 – May 13, 1993

Related
- Knots Landing: Back to the Cul-de-Sac (1997); Dallas (1978); Dallas (2012)

Knots Landing is an American primetime television soap opera that aired on CBS from December 27, 1979, to May 13, 1993. A spin-off of Dallas, it was set in a fictitious coastal suburb of Los Angeles and initially centered on the lives of four married couples living on a cul-de-sac, Seaview Circle. Throughout its 14-year run, storylines included marital strife, rape, murder, kidnapping, assassinations, drug smuggling, politics, addictions, environmental issues, corporate intrigue, and criminal investigations. By the time of its conclusion, it had become the third-longest-running primetime drama on American television after Gunsmoke and Bonanza (Note: Bonanza and Knots Landing were surpassed by Law & Order in 2004.) and the last scripted primetime drama show that debuted in the 1970s to leave the air. (Note: Dallas, which ended in 1991, was the only other scripted primetime show from the 1970s that lasted past 1986. Saturday Night Live debuted in 1975 and is still in production as of 2022. However, SNL is not traditionally included in the category of "scripted" shows, which in entertainment industry parlance means 30- to 60-minute sitcoms and dramas and excludes variety and sketch shows even if they are pre-scripted rather than improvised. In the majority of the U.S., SNL also airs later than the timeslots considered "primetime".)

Knots Landing was created by David Jacobs (one-time writer of Family and later producer of Lois & Clark: The New Adventures of Superman) in conjunction with producer Michael Filerman (who would also later co-produce Falcon Crest). Although a spin-off of Dallas, the concept predates that series, and was rebuffed by CBS in 1977, as the network wanted something more "saga-like". Jacobs then created Dallas, which the network accepted and premiered in 1978. After Dallas became a hit, Jacobs was then able to adapt Knots Landing as a spin-off series by way of incorporating the characters of Gary and Valene Ewing who were first introduced in Dallas. The series was largely inspired by a 1957 movie No Down Payment and also by the 1973 Ingmar Bergman television miniseries Scenes from a Marriage.

Though initially not as popular in the ratings as Dallas, Knots Landing ultimately outlasted it and garnered much critical acclaim. There were 344 episodes spanning 14 seasons of Knots Landing from 1979 to 1993. In 1997, much of the cast reunited for a two-part miniseries titled Knots Landing: Back to the Cul-de-Sac. In 2005, they reunited again for the non-fiction special Knots Landing Reunion: Together Again in which the cast reminisced about their time on the show. Dallas itself was revived in 2012, with Gary and Valene Ewing appearing in its second season. During nearly the entire run of the original series, Knots Landing occupied the same timeslot: Thursday nights at 10:00 p.m. For a while, it was moved to the 9:00 p.m. timeslot when Falcon Crest was moved to Thursday nights for the final four episodes of its run. When Falcon Crest ended its run, Knots Landing was moved back to its 10:00 p.m. timeslot and stayed there until it ended its run. On two other occasions, Knots Landing was also moved to Thursdays at 9:00 p.m. to make room for two short-lived dramas, Jessica Novak and Kay O'Brien.

== Backstory ==
Gary Ewing (David Ackroyd) was the middle son and black sheep of the Ewing family from Dallas. His father Jock (Jim Davis) and elder brother J. R. (Larry Hagman) had never treated him as an equal, and viewed him as a weak link. At 17, Gary ran away from home and met 15-year-old waitress Valene Clements (Joan Van Ark) and quickly married her, producing a daughter, Lucy (Charlene Tilton). The family arrived at Southfork Ranch, the Ewing homestead, and found that Gary had risen in his family's estimations: Jock liked Valene and was proud to be a grandfather, and Gary's mother Miss Ellie (Barbara Bel Geddes) was thrilled to have him home. At his parents' insistence, J. R. started including him in dealings at Ewing Oil, but J. R. tasked him with business deals doomed to fail and made it appear that Gary was at fault. The pressure led Gary into alcoholism. Unable to cope with disappointing his family, he fled Southfork, leaving Valene and Lucy behind. Without Gary in his way, J. R. persecuted Valene until she left Texas with infant Lucy. She went to Tennessee to find her mother, Lilimae Clements (Julie Harris), but Lilimae turned her away. Shortly afterward, J. R. found her and took Lucy back to Southfork to be raised by "true Ewings" and threatened Valene against returning to Texas.

Years later, youngest Ewing brother Bobby (Patrick Duffy) and his wife Pamela (Victoria Principal) found Gary working as a waiter in Las Vegas, and they convinced him to return home and visit Miss Ellie. At the same time, Lucy discovered that Valene had returned to Dallas and was working as a waitress in a diner, and began meeting with her in secret to avoid J. R.'s wrath. Lucy then engineered a meeting between her parents, which led to them reconciling and moving into Southfork together. J. R., upset and jealous that his parents were now lauding Gary's new start, saddled him with a failing company, the pressures of which led to him choosing to leave Southfork before he relapsed into drinking again. J. R. then forced Valene off the ranch again without letting her say goodbye to Lucy; J. R. pretended that Valene had abandoned her again, and taken a $5000 payoff from him.

A year later, Valene appeared at Lucy's college hoping for a reconciliation. Still thinking Valene had run out on her, Lucy rebuffed her. However, with help from Bobby, Lucy and Valene reconciled again and they maintained their relationship. Shortly afterwards, Valene revealed to Miss Ellie that she and Gary were still writing to each other. Gary (now portrayed by Ted Shackelford) returned to Dallas and mended his relationship with Jock, before marrying Valene for a second time. After they announced that they were planning to move to California, Miss Ellie bought them a newly-built house as a wedding present.

Knots Landing is officially spun off from Dallas in the third-season episode "Return Engagements".

== Series synopsis ==
=== Season 1 (1979–80) ===
Knots Landing title card (seasons 1 and 2)

In the first episode, newly remarried Gary and Val arrive in Knots Landing, California, and move into Seaview Circle, a suburban cul-de-sac. They meet their neighbors, Sid Fairgate (Don Murray), the owner of Knots Landing Motors, a Ford and Mercury new and used car dealership, and his wife Karen (Michele Lee), the parents of three children: Eric (Steve Shaw), Diana (Claudia Lonow), and Michael (Patrick Petersen). Also living on the cul-de-sac is corporate lawyer Richard Avery (John Pleshette) and his real estate agent wife Laura (Constance McCashin), who have a young son, Jason. Other neighbors include the young couple Kenny Ward (James Houghton), a record producer, and his wife Ginger (Kim Lankford), a kindergarten teacher. Early in the series, Gary becomes a salesman at Knots Landing Motors, and deals with visits from his wealthy brothers from Dallas, Bobby (guest star Patrick Duffy) and J. R. Ewing (guest star Larry Hagman). Gary and Valene get a visit from their teenage daughter Lucy (Charlene Tilton), although she decides to return to Dallas, and from Valene's estranged mother, Lilimae (Julie Harris). Sid and Karen deal with problems surrounding Sid's oldest daughter, Annie (Karen Allen), Richard and Laura deal with the circumstances surrounding Laura's rape, and Kenny and Ginger's marriage hits the rocks when Kenny starts an affair with a young singer named Sylvie (Louise Vallance). In the season finale, Gary relapses into alcoholism, endangering his marriage.

=== Season 2 (1980–81) ===
At the beginning of the second season, Sid's manipulative younger sister, Abby Cunningham (Donna Mills), a recent divorcée and the mother of two children, Olivia (Tonya Crowe) and Brian (Bobby Jacoby, later Brian Austin Green), move to Knots Landing. Abby starts working for her brother at Knots Landing Motors and immediately takes an interest in Richard, beginning a rather open affair with him, and she makes sure that Valene discovers Gary having an affair with Judy Trent (guest star Jane Elliot), the wife of a man he befriended while in Alcoholics Anonymous. In the meantime, Laura starts an affair with her boss, Scooter Warren (Allan Miller), and Abby soon dumps Richard when her ex-husband, Jeff (Barry Jenner), threatens to take her children from her. While separated from Kenny, Ginger starts a romance with the father of one of her students, although she and Kenny eventually reconcile. Near the end of the season, Valene discovers that the growth she had taken out was malignant and has to have a colonoscopy. Jeff succeeds in taking Olivia and Brian from Abby, leaving her frantic. Three criminals break into Val's house while Ginger's baby shower is going on and the women are held hostage until a swat team arrives. When Sid discovered some car parts that Gary and Abby had purchased were actually stolen, his brakes were tampered with to keep him from testifying in court. As a result, in the season finale, Sid's car plunges off a cliff.

=== Season 3 (1981–82) ===
At the start of the third season, Sid undergoes surgery but dies of his injuries. Karen becomes the head of Knots Landing Motors, subsequently firing Abby, although she was soon rehired. Meanwhile, Abby and Gary start an affair, and Ginger gives birth to a daughter, Erin Molly, and makes Karen her godmother. Karen's brother, Joe Cooper (Stephen Macht), takes a job at USC as a bookkeeper and briefly stays with the Fairgate family before leaving town. Valene's mother, Lilimae Clements, moves in with Gary and Valene, enabling Valene and Lilimae to gradually fix their estranged relationship. Laura plans to leave Richard and marry her real-estate sales boss, Scooter, but when Laura learns she is pregnant, she decides to reconcile with Richard and end her affair with Scooter. However, Richard loses his job and suffers a nervous breakdown, holds Laura hostage in their home at gunpoint. Laura subsequently sends Richard to a mental institution. After Karen passes up the opportunity to fund a methanol-powered vehicle project, Gary and Abby devote the majority of their time to making the deal without Karen's help. In the season finale, Valene discovers Gary and Abby's affair and leaves him.

=== Season 4 (1982–83) ===
In season four, Valene returns to the cul-de-sac and throws Gary out of the house, leaving him free to move in with Abby. He then inherits millions of dollars from his recently deceased father, Jock Ewing (Jim Davis). Investing money in several ways, Gary takes an interest in a beautiful younger singer named Ciji Dunne (Lisa Hartman). Valene releases her book, titled Capricorn Crude, a thinly veiled exposé of the Ewings of Dallas. With the charges dropped against Sid Fairgate's killers, Karen seeks the help of federal prosecutor Mack MacKenzie (Kevin Dobson), whom she starts dating and eventually marries mid-season. Valene's publicist, Chip Roberts (Michael Sabatino), moves in with Valene and Lilimae, and trouble starts when he dates Diana and Ciji at the same time, later getting Ciji pregnant. Ciji insists on keeping the baby, much to Chip's annoyance and anger. Ciji also became close to Laura which angered Richard, and was also romantically linked to Gary. Ciji's dead body was later discovered on the beach, and there are many suspects, most prominently Gary, Valene, Chip, Richard and Abby. Richard realises his marriage is over and leaves Knots Landing, and Kenny and Ginger move to Nashville where she starts her music career. Karen learns that Chip's real name is Tony Fenice and that he's a fugitive wanted for assault and battery on a woman in Seattle, but is too late to stop Diana leaving town with him. The season ends with Gary sitting in jail, awaiting trial for Ciji's murder.

=== Season 5 (1983–84) ===
Gary is cleared of Ciji's murder, and the police hunt for Chip who is now their prime suspect. He is eventually arrested but not before he and Diana are married, which strains her relationship with Karen who becomes so stressed that she becomes addicted to prescription painkillers. Meanwhile, Sid and Abby's uncle dies, leaving Abby and (by default) Karen a land inheritance at Lotus Point, California. Without Karen's knowledge, Abby schemes to build a resort on the land while cutting Karen out of her plans. Abby then forms a company called Apolune, a secret subsidiary of Gary's corporation, and she convinces Gary to marry her so she can share the inheritance he got from his father. Valene begins a relationship with journalist Ben Gibson (Douglas Sheehan), but after a one-night stand with Gary, she learns she is pregnant with twins. Valene decides not to tell Gary that he is the father, as he is now married to Abby, and as she had fallen in love with Ben. However, Ben could not accept that Valene was pregnant with another man's children and he and Valene break up. Abby hires a Ciji look-alike, Cathy Geary (also played by Lisa Hartman), to keep Gary distracted so he would not learn about her crooked business dealings. Politician Greg Sumner (William Devane), an old college friend of Mack's who was running for U.S. Senator, receives the endorsements of Mack and Karen, as well as Abby, who wanted to buy herself a senator. Greg hires Mack to lead his Senate Crime Commission investigating the sinister Wolfbridge Group. Abby convinces Greg to get her an illegal land variance to build on Lotus Point but, after pressure from Wolfbridge, Greg pins it on Mack in order to discredit his investigation, thus ending their friendship. While a fugitive from the police, Chip falls on a pitchfork and dies after seeing Cathy, thinking she was Ciji back from the dead. After Karen's recovery from her drug addiction, she and Diana reconcile. Wolfbridge forces Abby into making them her partners in the Lotus Point development. Mack investigates the land ownership at Lotus Point and Laura confesses that Apolune is Abby's company. Gary decides to divorce Abby as he cannot trust her. When Mack fakes Gary's death to snare Wolfbridge, Karen leaves him, believing his obsession with Wolfbridge has cost them their marriage. In the season finale, Mack tries to trick Wolfbridge leader Mark St. Clare into trying to kill Gary again, but St. Claire's assassin accidentally shoots Karen instead. Abby is kidnapped by the Wolfbridge Group when they realized they've failed.

=== Season 6 (1984–85) ===
Greg kills Mark St. Clare, who was holding Abby hostage on a boat. After being shot, Karen refuses to have risky surgery because she is afraid that she would be paralyzed or die like Sid did, but without it she only has months to live. Meanwhile, Gary and Abby reconcile and, along with Karen, they agree to become partners in Lotus Point. Lilimae's secret son and Valene's half-brother, Joshua Rush (Alec Baldwin), whom Lilimae abandoned as an infant, arrives in Knots Landing and moves in with Lilimae and Valene. He soon starts a romance with Cathy, who has moved into the cul-de-sac with Laura and her children. Abby starts running a television station, World Pacific Cable, that Ben becomes a journalist for after Gary purchased it. Joshua also works at the station and later becomes a popular televangelist. Abby is stunned to learn that Gary is the father of Valene's unborn twins, and Abby tells Scott Easton (Jack Bannon), an influential lobbyist with shady connections, about her problem. As a favor to Abby, Scott arranges to have Valene's babies kidnapped at birth, though without Abby's approval. Valene is told the babies were stillborn, although she insists she saw them alive. Her mental health deteriorates and she leaves Knots Landing and goes to Tennessee. She assumes the identity of Verna Ellers (a character from one of her books) and works as a waitress. Karen and Mack reconcile, and Karen eventually gets the operation she needs in order to make a full recovery. Gary befriends the aging millionaire Paul Galveston (Howard Duff), and Galveston offers Gary the opportunity to develop Empire Valley, a large piece of real estate. Galveston soon dies, and he leaves his millions to Greg, who is proven to have been his son. Assuming he had been left Empire Valley, Greg resigns from the Senate, but is shocked to learn that the land had been left to Gary. Greg's devious mother, Ruth (guest star Ava Gardner), comes to visit her son after Galveston's death. Ruth becomes close to Abby (since they have similar interests), but loathes Laura, who, by this time has started a relationship with Greg. Around this same time, Joshua and Cathy grow closer, and the two soon marry. Valene (still believing she is "Verna") becomes engaged to a man in Tennessee, but Gary finally finds her and brings her back to Knots Landing, where she rekindles her romance with Ben, but still believes her babies to be alive. Karen and Ben discover that Valene's doctor had paid off a nurse to assist in the kidnapping of Valene's children. Mack tracks down Valene's babies, who had been adopted illegally. Abby confides in Greg that she inadvertently caused the kidnapping of Valene's babies, but she now wants to get them back. In the season finale, Abby goes to Valene and tells her that she knows where her babies are, and the two go to the home of Sheila and Harry Fisher (Robin Ginsburg and Joe Regalbuto). Sheila disbelieves their claims that the babies were adopted illegally and shouts to warn Harry who takes off with one of the twins in his car.

=== Season 7 (1985–86) ===
After a frantic battle to expose the illegal black market adoption, Valene's children are returned to her, whom she names Betsy and Bobby. Valene and Ben agree to raise the children as theirs, and the two soon marry. Abby successfully covers her tracks in the matter by simply telling Gary that she had received a phone call for a "Mrs. Ewing" telling her where the babies could be found. Gary receives news of his brother Bobby's death and returns to Dallas for the funeral (Bobby Ewing's death was later explained as being a "dream" on Dallas at the start of its tenth season in 1986, though this was never acknowledged on Knots Landing as Bobby was never mentioned again). Empire Valley went awry when Gary learns that Galveston Industries and its partners were secretly building an underground espionage operation there. Gary subsequently blows Empire Valley up. Peter Hollister (Hunt Block) goes to work for Greg, and with the help of Sylvia Lean (guest star Ruth Roman) acting as his mother, Peter convinces Greg that he is also Paul Galveston's son, therefore making he and Greg half brothers. Jill Bennett (Teri Austin), Peter's sister, becomes Mack's new colleague, although Jill and Peter keep their relationship a secret as an effort to get revenge on the Galveston family for having wronged their family years before. Abby soon discovers that Sylvia is not Peter's mother and that Peter is not Galveston's son, therefore blackmailing Peter into paying her to keep their secret safe. In the meantime, Joshua becomes increasingly controlling and abusive towards Cathy, and in a moment of rage he tries to kill her but falls of the roof of a building and dies. Cathy soon starts an affair with Ben, who becomes her manager for her budding singing career but she later leaves town. Abby discovers that her daughter Olivia has developed a drug problem. A young woman named Paige Matheson (Nicollette Sheridan), comes to Knots Landing and explains to Mack that she is his illegitimate daughter. In the finale, Karen disappears and is being held hostage by a man in his basement.

=== Season 8 (1986–87) ===
Karen's kidnapper is revealed to be Phil Harbert (guest star Louis Giambalvo), an old friend of Greg and Mack's from law school, who had become bitter towards Mack, having blamed him for causing the death of his wife. Karen escapes and Phil is killed after being hit by a car. Ben returns to Valene, promising to make their marriage work but faces problems from Jean Hackney (Wendy Fulton), who tries to trick Ben into doing a mission for an underground organization to kill Greg. When Valene's babies are threatened, Ben reluctantly agrees to assist Jean. With Mack's help, Ben foils the plan, although Jean continues to threaten him and his family which prompts Ben to leave the country at the end of the season. Laura angrily blames Valene for not telling her about the plot to kill Greg. Laura also tells Greg that she is pregnant, but he is not enthusiastic about it, and she refuses to have an abortion. In the meantime, Paige reveals that she faked her death in order to escape the control of her wealthy grandparents, although Karen doubts the story, believing her to be an impostor. Also, Paige had developed a romantic relationship with Michael, Karen's son, but she soon tires of him and starts romancing Peter. Abby's daughter Olivia's drug addiction has worsened, eventually leading to the injuring of Lilimae in a car accident, and Abby resorts to desperate measures to get her clean. When her drug dealer beats up her younger brother Brian, Olivia finally admits to her addiction and decides to get clean. Olivia then becomes friends with Peter, and develops a crush on him, although he is interested in Paige. Peter, having become state senator with Greg's support, goes to the extreme to hide the fact that Jill is his sister, who has started a relationship with Gary. When Jill and Peter have an argument, Jill is injured in a fall from and Peter flees the scene to avoid any link to her or the accident. Paige's mother, Anne Matheson (Michelle Phillips), whom Paige had said was dead, appears and tries to rekindle her love affair with Mack. When Mack refuses her advances, she turns her attention to Greg, who also turns her down, and she therefore leaves town. At the end of the season, Abby finds Olivia standing over Peter's dead body. With both assuming the other had killed Peter, Abby frantically buries his body under the soil at Lotus Point where cement is to be poured the following day. Some weeks later, believing she had successfully hidden Peter's body, Abby is informed by Karen that there is a crack in the cement foundations and that it has to be pulled up and redone.

=== Season 9 (1987–88) ===
When Peter's body is discovered, Olivia is charged with his murder, although Abby steps in to take the blame for her daughter. It is soon learned, however, that Paige accidentally caused Peter's death, although no charges are made against her. Laura decides to make up with Valene, but then tells Greg she is dying of a brain tumor, though he refuses to accept it. Laura leaves Knots Landing to die elsewhere, thus leaving Greg with their infant child, a daughter named Meg. Overcome with grief and feeling unable to raise the child himself, Greg asks Karen and Mack to adopt Meg, which they agree to. Meanwhile, Lilimae leaves town after starting a new romance, and Abby rekindles her love affair with her old flame, Charles Scott (Michael York). Abby and Charles briefly marry, but when Abby discovers his ulterior motives about developing a Lotus Point Marina, she annuls the marriage after taking millions of dollars from him. Frank (Larry Riley) and Pat Williams (Lynne Moody) and their daughter Julie (Kent Masters-King) move into Laura's old house on the cul-de-sac. Karen and Mack are initially suspicious of them, but become their friends upon learning they are in the witness protection program. With business at Lotus Point reaching a low, Karen, Abby, and Gary agree to expand the marina to accommodate the business of Manny Vasquez (John Aprea). Paige starts working for Greg, and becomes attracted to him. Paige and Michael go on an archaeological dig in Mexico. When it is learned that Manny is selling illegal drugs through Lotus Point, Karen, Abby, and Gary try to stop him, but to no avail. Manny tells them that he will hold Paige and Michael hostage in Mexico unless they allow him to continue his dealings through Lotus Point. Gary takes an increased interest in Valene's twins, his biological children, much to the annoyance of Jill, who has moved in with Gary. Jill conceives an elaborate plan where she edits audio recordings of Ben's voice to make Valene think he was trying to contact her. In an effort to make Valene appear unstable, Jill steals the tapes, leaving Valene with no proof of Ben trying to contact her. In the season finale, Jill goes to Valene's home and, at gunpoint, she forces Valene to swallow sleeping pills, hoping it will appear that Valene has committed suicide. The following morning, Valene is found motionless on her bedroom floor.

=== Season 10 (1988–89) ===
Frank finds Valene unconscious and telephones for an ambulance. Valene survives and says that Jill had tried to kill her. While Jill has provided herself with an alibi, Valene's testimony is later proven true. With doubt on her innocence, Jill was left friendless and she thereby tied herself up and locked herself in the trunk of Gary's car, hoping to frame Gary for kidnapping her. When Jill dies in the trunk, Gary is charged with her murder, although Mack has the charges dropped when it is learned Jill had deliberately locked herself in the trunk. A con artist tried to extort money from Frank and Pat by threatening to reveal their whereabouts to the people that had threatened Pat's life years earlier. Mack halted the con artist, and used dental records from a deceased family to make him believe that the Sollars (the Williamses' original surname) were dead. Paige and Michael were eventually able to get out of Mexico, and Manny Vasquez's nephew, Harold Dyer (Paul Carafotes), kills his uncle when he tried to kill Mack. Paige seduced Greg and the two became a couple, although their relationship soon ended when Greg decided to run for mayor of Los Angeles. Realizing Paige would not make a good political wife, Greg instead marries Abby, although Paige keeps her job with Greg's company. Greg tried to regain custody of his daughter Meg from Mack and Karen, but he lost the case. Later, Mack goes through a mid-life crisis and quits his job, and thereby starts his own law practice. Following a health and safety report, the Lotus Point land has to be sold. However, it was soon revealed that Abby had falsified the report after she discovered that there was oil underneath Lotus Point, and created a company to conceal who was buying the resort from her partners. Paige exposed that the whole thing had been initiated by Abby and her cohort Ted Melcher (Robert Desiderio), which infuriated Karen, who was determined to send Abby to jail for fraud. Abby narrowly avoided being imprisoned, and agreed to donate Lotus Point to city as a public park. Abby then leaves Greg and Knots Landing, accepting a Trade Envoy job in Japan (a job Greg himself wanted after losing the run for mayor). Paige, meanwhile, finds herself caught between Greg and Ted Melcher, one of whom is a murderer.

=== Season 11 (1989–90) ===
Valene and Gary become separately involved with another divorced couple, Danny (Sam Behrens) and Amanda Waleska (Penny Peyser). Gary learns that Danny had beaten and raped Amanda, but when he tells Valene she refuses to believe him, and she ends up marrying Danny. However, when she realizes the truth, Valene tries to kick him out of her house. When Danny becomes violent, Valene takes her twins and moves in with Gary. The two rekindle their romance and eventually make plans to remarry. While drunk, Danny hits Pat Williams with his car, and she is left on life support in the hospital. When told that Pat is permanently brain dead, Frank decides to have her life support turned off. Olivia marries Harold, but they run into financial troubles when Abby cuts Olivia off financially. The couple soon make the decision to leave Knots Landing and move to Miami. Paula Vertosick (Melinda Culea) befriends Mack and almost has an affair with Mack. Michael befriends Paula and invites her to meet Karen. Karen and Paula team up to prevent an oil drilling project to occur at Lotus Point. Karen discovers that Paula is attracted to Mack. Paula starts dating Greg. Anne moves to town and starts flirting with Greg. Eric's wife Linda Fairgate (Lar Park-Lincoln) moves in with Karen and Mack, and starts an affair with Eric's younger brother Michael. Linda then divorces Eric and finds employment with the Sumner Group, where she becomes a rival of Paige's. Greg's daughter, Mary Frances (Stacy Galina), visits him after a six-year estrangement and is shot dead in her father's office, making Greg believe that he had been the intended target. Greg himself had been shot by Mary Frances' activist boyfriend, Robert Scarrow (John David Bland), although he survives. Robert blames Greg for manufacturing poisonous chemicals that cause liver cancer, and he also admits to being the one that killed Mary Frances. Now broke, Paige's mother Anne returns to Knots Landing, in an attempt to cheat Paige out of an inheritance that her grandfather left her. Anne steals Paige's identity in an effort to obtain her daughter's money, although the plan soon goes awry. Paige soon falls in love with Tom Ryan (Joseph Gian), a crooked cop, and the two plan to marry, but Tom leaves Paige at the altar after Greg blackmailed him. Karen starts presenting a television talk show, but she becomes the target of an obsessive fan by the name of Jeff Cameron (Chris Lemmon), one of the show's producers.

=== Season 12 (1990–91) ===
Jeff starts a plot to murder Karen, but he is eventually caught and imprisoned. With Greg's health on a downward spiral, his half-sister Claudia Whittaker (Kathleen Noone) comes to town along with her daughter Kate (also Stacy Galina), who bears a striking resemblance to Greg's dead daughter Mary Frances. When she realizes she is not in Greg's will, Claudia arranges for him to get a liver so he will live. Kate meets Steve Brewer (Lance Guest), a man claiming to be her brother. Steve, who had been put up for adoption by Claudia, was the product of an affair between Claudia and Paul Galveston (her mother's dead husband, and Greg's biological father - which makes him both Greg's half-brother and nephew). Kate and Steve become good friends, but Claudia, who wants Steve gone, has him framed by placing a gun in his car. Since Steve was already a felon, the gun violated his parole and he was later gunned down trying to run away from the police. Mack befriends a high school student named Jason Lochner (Thomas Wilson Brown), who was living with an abusive father. Jason later moves in with Mack and Karen, and dates Julie Williams. Frank, Julie's father, passes his lawyer bar exam and goes to work as an attorney at Mack's independent firm. Danny continues harassing Valene, and he soon assaults Gary with a baseball bat. After forcing Gary to drink alcohol, Danny puts him a car a sends it over a cliff, hoping to make his death appear accidental. However, the airbag saves Gary's life, but Danny is found dead in the Williams' swimming pool. In the investigation surrounding Danny's death, almost everyone is a suspect, although it was soon discovered that his death was accidental. Valene falls from a horse and suffers from psychiatric problems, but she soon recovers and she and Gary get married for the third time. Anne meets the scheming Italian Nick Schillace (Lorenzo Caccialanza), with whom she romances and embarks on a series of illegal schemes in an effort to obtain wealth. Their plans backfire when Nick suddenly leaves town, leaving Anne homeless. Paige and Linda continue to despise one another, a mutual disliking that is further fueled when Linda has an affair with Greg. At the end of the season, Karen furiously pursues a group of teenagers after they paintball her for fun. A high-speed car chase results in a crash, and one of the teenagers in the crash is Jason.

=== Season 13 (1991–92) ===
Kate blames Claudia for Steve's death and removes her mother from her life, but they soon reconcile when Claudia attempts suicide. After some months of living on the streets, Anne meets the shady Benny Appleman (Stuart Pankin), and the two try to scheme their way into getting money. Anne later agrees to pose nude for a magazine and she also becomes the host of a late-night advice show, which becomes a success. Linda, Eric's ex-wife, is murdered by Brian Johnston (Philip Brown), who holds the MacKenzies hostage. Jason soon leaves Knots Landing for Sweden, and, shortly thereafter, Julie decides to move away as well. Frank has a brief relationship with television producer Debbie Porter (Halle Berry), before he too leaves town. Gary invested in a project that turned energy from the ocean's tides into usable electric energy. The man behind the operation, Joseph Barringer (Mark Soper), becomes Kate's boyfriend. Paige, meanwhile, joins Gary and her new boyfriend Pierce (Bruce Greenwood) in a partnership. A former flame of Pierce's, Victoria Broyard (Marcia Cross), informs Paige that Pierce had killed his previous girlfriend, but Paige does not believe her. Paige is later shot by Pierce (who was aiming for Greg, whom he hated), temporarily paralyzing her. Pierce then kidnaps Paige, and holds her hostage on his yacht. Mack and Greg rescue her after she and Pierce fall into the water. Pierce's body is never found, and it is presumed he drowned. Alex Barth (Boyd Kestner), the nephew of the Galveston housekeeper, blackmails Claudia for refusing to allow his ailing mother to receive treatment, thus leading to her death. Claudia also takes a disliking to Joseph and she arranges for him to get another job, thus ending his romance with Kate. Gary, who had been left bankrupt after investing his money to Tidal Energy, moves back to Seaview Circle with Valene. Mary Robeson (Maree Cheatham) arrives in Knots Landing and tells Valene she is Laura's biological mother and therefore Meg's real grandmother. Valene does not believe her, and while researching Mary in Florida, Valene is kidnapped. Later, when Paige gets into her car, she is horrified to see Pierce waiting for her in the back seat.

=== Season 14 (1992–93) ===
While trying to find Valene, Gary sees the car she was in explode. Greg decides to retire from the Sumner Group, and he leaves one third of the company to Claudia, a third to Paige, and the other third to Mack and Karen in a trust for Meg. Anne reveals she is pregnant, leading to Greg marrying her, but she discovers she suffered a "hysterical pregnancy". Meanwhile, Anne's old beau Nick returns and the two rekindle their affair and their old conniving ways. Mack seeks $1 million to get Mary Robeson to stop the custody battle over Meg. Claudia gives Mack $500,000 from the Sumner Group, and gives the other half to Nick to start a restaurant. Paige demanded an audit, but Claudia cannot get the money from Nick back because he already spent it. Karen condemns Mack's handling of Mary Robeson's efforts to win custody of Meg. She leaves him and goes to New York to stay with her daughter Diana. A shady organization run by Daniel Treadwell (Daniel Gerroll) begins terrorizing everybody with its sights set on the Sumner Group. Gary starts a relationship with Kate. In the series finale, Karen returns to Mack, and the presumed dead Valene returns, revealing she kidnapped by Treadwell's people, who had threatened to harm her for coming across secretive information and that it was another captor was in the car that exploded. Treadwell's mysterious partner is revealed to be Abby, who has been orchestrating the takeover of the Sumner Group all along. However, Greg stops Abby by threatening to reveal her dirty dealings while she was in Japan. As Treadwell prepares to kill Nick, who was working for him, Treadwell himself was killed by Vanessa Hunt (Felicity Waterman). Anne offers to divorce Greg so he can resume his relationship with her daughter Paige, whom he loves. Claudia decides to leave Knots Landing for Monaco, and at the airport, she runs into Anne and Nick, who are also leaving town. In the final scenes, back at Seaview Circle, Karen, Mack, Valene, and Gary prepare a barbecue as a new couple begin moving into Frank Williams' old home. Meanwhile, Abby arrives at the gathering and reveals that she has just purchased her old house in Seaview Circle. Valene simply smiles and welcomes Abby back, before she and Gary go home. Realizing Gary and Valene are happily reunited, Abby looks at Karen and comments "Just like old times, isn't it?". In the final shot, Karen watches Abby go inside her new home, mildly concerned as to what effect her return will have on the cul-de-sac, before smiling contentedly.

== Cast and characters ==
=== Main cast ===
| Character | Actor | Seasons | | | | | | | | | | | | | | |
| Character | Actor | 1 | 2 | 3 | 4 | 5 | 6 | 7 | 8 | 9 | 10 | 11 | 12 | 13 | 14 | Reunion |
|---|---|---|---|---|---|---|---|---|---|---|---|---|---|---|---|---|
| Kenny Ward | James Houghton | Main | Main | Main | Main | | | | | | | | | | | |
| Ginger Ward | Kim Lankford | Main | Main | Main | Main | | | | | | | | | | | Guest |
| Karen Fairgate MacKenzie | Michele Lee | Main | Main | Main | Main | Main | Main | Main | Main | Main | Main | Main | Main | Main | Main | Main |
| Laura Avery Sumner | Constance McCashin | Main (Note: McCashin departs in "Noises Everywhere (Part 2)" (ep. 9.11).) | Main | Main | Main | Main | Main | Main | Main | Main | | | | | | |
| Sid Fairgate | Don Murray | Main (Note: Murray departs in "Critical Condition" (ep. 3.2).) | Main | Main | | | | | | | | | | | | |
| Richard Avery | John Pleshette | Main | Main | Main | Main | | | | | Guest | | | | | | |
| Gary Ewing | Ted Shackelford | Main | Main | Main | Main | Main | Main | Main | Main | Main | Main | Main | Main | Main | Main | Main |
| Valene Clements Ewing Gibson Waleska Ewing | Joan Van Ark | Main | Main | Main | Main | Main | Main | Main | Main | Main | Main | Main | Main | Main | Guest | Main |
| Abby Fairgate Cunningham Ewing Sumner | Donna Mills | | Main | Main | Main | Main | Main | Main | Main | Main | Main | | | | Guest | Main |
| Mack MacKenzie | Kevin Dobson | | | | Main | Main | Main | Main | Main | Main | Main | Main | Main | Main | Main | Main |
| Lilimae Clements | Julie Harris | Guest | | Recurring | Main (Note: Harris departs in "Flight of the Sunbirds" (ep. 9.9).) | Main | Main | Main | Main | Main | | | | | | |
| Diana Fairgate Roberts | Claudia Lonow | Recurring | Recurring | Recurring | Recurring | Main | Guest | | | | | | | | Recurring | Guest |
| Ben Gibson | Douglas Sheehan | | | | | Main | Main | Main | Main | | | | | | | |
| Greg Sumner | William Devane | | | | | Main (Note: Devane is added to the opening credits from "Marital Privilege" (ep. 5.4).) | Main | Main | Main | Main | Main | Main | Main | Main | Main | Main |
| Joshua Rush | Alec Baldwin | | | | | | Main (Note: Baldwin departs in "Rise and Fall" (ep. 7.10).) | Main | | | | | | | | |
| Ciji Dunne | Lisa Hartman | | | | Recurring | | | | | | | | | | | |
| Cathy Geary Rush | Lisa Hartman | | | | | Recurring | Main | Main | | | | | | | | |
| Jill Bennett | Teri Austin | | | | | | Guest | Recurring | Recurring | Recurring | Main | | | | | |
| Paige Matheson | Nicollette Sheridan | | | | | | | Guest | Recurring | Recurring | Main | Main | Main | Main | Main | Guest |
| Olivia Cunningham Dyer | Tonya Crowe | | Recurring | Recurring | Recurring | Recurring | Recurring | Recurring | Recurring | Recurring | Recurring | Main | | | | Guest |
| Michael Fairgate | Patrick Petersen | Recurring | Recurring | Recurring | Recurring | Recurring | Recurring | Recurring | Recurring | Recurring | Recurring | Main | Main | | | Guest |
| Anne Matheson | Michelle Phillips | | | | | | | | Recurring | | Guest | Recurring | Main | Main | Main | Also Starring |
| Frank Williams | Larry Riley | | | | | | | | | Recurring | Recurring | Recurring | Main | Main | | |
| Kate Whittaker | Stacy Galina | | | | | | | | | | | | Recurring | Main | Main | Also Starring |
| Claudia Whittaker | Kathleen Noone | | | | | | | | | | | | Recurring | Main | Main | |

Cast notes

=== Supporting cast ===
Throughout the show's fourteen seasons, there were a wide array of actors in supporting roles. The most notable of these include:

- Steve Shaw as Eric Fairgate (seasons 1–11), Sid and Karen's eldest son;
- Bobby Jacoby (seasons 2–5) and Brian Austin Green (seasons 6–10 and Reunion) as Brian Cunningham, Abby's son;
- Michael Sabatino as Chip Roberts (seasons 4–5), Valene's publicist who murders Ciji and marries Diana;
- Joseph Chapman as Mark St. Claire (seasons 5–6), villainous character
- Peter Fox as Tom Jezik (seasons 5–6), Wolfbridge tax worker
- Howard Duff as Paul Galveston (seasons 6 and 11), a millionaire industrialist who turns out to be Greg Sumner's biological father;
- Ava Gardner as Ruth Sumner Galveston (season 6), Greg and Claudia's wildlife photographer mother;
- Hunt Block as Peter Hollister (seasons 7–8), Jill Bennett's brother who poses as Paul's son and Greg's half-brother, eventually killed by Paige;
- Ruth Roman as Sylvia Lean (seasons 7–8), a former fling of Paul Galveston's hired by Peter to pose as his mother;
- Allen Williams as Stan Behar (seasons 7–8), a detective;
- Michael York as Charles Scott (season 9), Abby's childhood sweetheart and eventual third husband;
- Lar Park Lincoln as Linda Fairgate (seasons 9 and 11–13), Eric's wife who has an affair with Michael, and uncredited as "Sally's Friend" (Season 10), with whom Gary accidentally strikes up a friendship over the phone;
- Lynne Moody as Patricia Williams (seasons 9–11), wife of Frank and mother of Julie;
- Paul Carafotes as Harold Dyer (seasons 9–11), Olivia's mobster husband;
- Kent Masters King as Julie Williams (seasons 9–13), Frank and Pat's teenage daughter;
- Robert Desiderio as Ted Melcher (seasons 10–11), Greg's murderous campaign manager when he runs for mayor;
- Betsy Palmer as Virginia Bullock (seasons 10–12), Lilimae's sister and Valene's aunt;
- Sam Behrens as Danny Waleska (seasons 10–12), Valene's psychopathic third husband;
- Penny Peyser as Amanda Michaels (seasons 10–11), Danny's abused ex-wife and girlfriend of Gary;
- Melinda Culea as Paula Vertosick (seasons 10–11), former Forest Ranger and romance of Greg's;
- Joseph Gian as Tom Ryan (seasons 11–12 and 14), a corrupt detective who romances Paige;
- Lorenzo Caccialanza as Nick Schillace/Dimitri Pappas (seasons 12 and 14), bankrupt Italian playboy-turned-conman;
- Tracy Reed as Charlotte Anderson (season 12), Julie's English teacher and Frank's first romance after Pat's death;
- Lance Guest as Steve Brewer (season 12), Claudia's illegitimate son by Paul Galveston;
- Mark Soper as Joseph Barringer (season 13), environmentalist businessman;
- Bruce Greenwood as Pierce Lawton (seasons 13–14), Paige's unhinged lover;
- Felicity Waterman as Vanessa Hunt (seasons 13–14), Kate's bisexual tennis cohort;
- Maree Cheatham as Mary Robeson (seasons 13–14), a woman claiming to be Meg's biological grandmother.

== Knots Landing/Dallas crossovers ==
=== Episodes ===
Between seasons 1 and 4 of Knots Landing, there were nine episodes where Dallas characters appeared, played by their respective actors.

Season 1 (1979–80 season)

- Episode 1: "Pilot". Guest starring Patrick Duffy as Bobby Ewing.
- Episode 2: "Community Spirit". Guest starring Larry Hagman as J. R. Ewing.
- Episode 6: "Home is For Healing" Guest starring Charlene Tilton as Lucy Ewing.

Season 2 (1980–81 season)

- Episode 5: "Kristin". Guest starring Mary Crosby as Kristin Shepard.
- Episode 9: "A Family Matter". Guest starring Larry Hagman as J. R. Ewing.
- Episode 13: "The Loudest Word". Guest starring Patrick Duffy as Bobby Ewing.
- Episode 17: "Designs". Guest starring Larry Hagman as J. R. Ewing.

Season 4 (1982–83 season)

- Episode 2: "Daniel". Guest starring Larry Hagman as J. R. Ewing.
- Episode 6: "New Beginnings". Guest starring Larry Hagman as J. R. Ewing, Patrick Duffy as Bobby Ewing and Eric Farlow as Christopher Ewing. This episode of Knots Landing was a direct continuation of the Dallas episode "Jock's Will", which aired on the same evening.

In addition to the above, the characters of Gary and Valene Ewing appeared in the following episodes of Dallas, as listed below.

Season 2 (1978–79 season)

- Episode 1: "Reunion, Part I". Featuring David Ackroyd as Gary Ewing and Joan Van Ark as Valene Clements
- Episode 2: "Reunion, Part II". Featuring David Ackroyd as Gary Ewing and Joan Van Ark as Valene Clements

Season 3 (1979–80 season)

- Episode 4: "Secrets". Featuring Joan Van Ark as Valene Clements
- Episode 14: "Return Engagements". Featuring Ted Shackelford as Gary Ewing and Joan Van Ark as Valene Clements

Season 4 (1980–81 season)

- Episode 1: "No More Mister Nice Guy, Part I". Featuring Ted Shackelford as Gary Ewing and Joan Van Ark as Valene Ewing
- Episode 2: "No More Mister Nice Guy, Part II". Featuring Ted Shackelford as Gary Ewing
- Episode 12: "End of the Road, Part II". Featuring Ted Shackelford as Gary Ewing and Joan Van Ark as Valene Ewing

Season 5 (1981–82 season)

- Episode 8: "The Split". Featuring Ted Shackelford as Gary Ewing and Joan Van Ark as Valene Ewing
- Episode 9: "Five Dollars a Barrel". Featuring Ted Shackelford as Gary Ewing

Season 6 (1982–83 season)

- Episode 5: "Jock's Will". Featuring Ted Shackelford as Gary Ewing. This episode of Dallas was directly followed by an episode of Knots Landing on the same evening titled "New Beginnings"

Season 9 (1985–86 season)

- Episode 1: "The Family Ewing". Featuring Ted Shackelford as Gary Ewing

Season 10 (1986–87 season)

- Episode 11: "Proof Positive". No Knots Landing characters appear in this episode, but the set normally used as Karen MacKenzie's (Michele Lee) kitchen doubles as a set in a movie featuring Mandy Winger (Deborah Shelton)

Season 12 (1988–89 season)

- Episode 14: "Comings and Goings". Featuring Joan Van Ark as Valene Clements in uncredited archive footage

Season 14 (1990–91 season)

- Episode 22: "Conundrum". Featuring Ted Shackelford as Gary Ewing and Joan Van Ark as Valene Wallace

=== The Death of Bobby Ewing ===
On Dallas, the character of Bobby Ewing (Patrick Duffy) was killed off in the final episode of the 1984–85 season. The following year, Duffy decided to return to Dallas and the character of Bobby was resurrected in the infamous "shower scene" at the end of the 1985–86 season. At the start of the 1986–87 season, it was revealed that Bobby's death and all but the final scene of the 1985–86 season had been a dream of Bobby's ex-wife, Pamela Barnes Ewing (Victoria Principal).

On Knots Landing during the 1985–86 season, Bobby's death had an indelible impact on some of the characters (i.e. Gary struggling to deal with his brother's death and being comforted by his wife Abby, Abby and Greg then taking advantage of Gary's absence to control development of Empire Valley, and Valene naming her baby son after the late Bobby). When Bobby's death and the subsequent season were revealed to be a dream on Dallas, this did not get applied to the continuity of Knots Landing. Unlike the Dallas producers, the Knots Landing producers were not prepared or willing to reset their series, resulting in the producers cutting ties between the two shows and Bobby's return was simply never addressed or even mentioned afterwards. Following this, no further crossover storylines were featured on Knots Landing.

=== Dallas (2012 TV series) ===
With the 2012 continuation of Dallas, rumors began surfacing that both Joan Van Ark and Ted Shackelford would reprise their roles as Valene and Gary Ewing on the new series. Shackelford passed on the small role the producers offered him during the first season, but accepted a multi-episode role during the second. Shackelford returned to Dallas for three episodes and Van Ark returned for one. This was the first time the characters had been seen since the 1997 miniseries Knots Landing: Back to the Cul-de-Sac. Although both Shackelford and Van Ark appeared in the 1991 series finale of Dallas playing "alternative" versions of Gary and Valene (the episode depicted an alternate reality in which J. R. Ewing had never been born), there have been no real crossovers of story or characters from Knots Landing to Dallas or vice versa since the 1985–86 season of each show (which, on Dallas, turned out to be a dream had by Pam Ewing). In the 2013 Dallas storyline, it is made clear that Gary and Val still had been living together at their home in California, though had recently separated due to Gary's brief relapse into alcoholism due to financial worries. At the end of their appearances on the new series of Dallas, Gary and Val return to California together.

== Behind the scenes ==
Knots Landing was created by David Jacobs, whose original concept was a show based on "family issues and examining relationships at the middle class level". CBS initially turned down this idea, as they wanted something more "glitzy" to put on the air, with wealthier characters, which would become Dallas. Once that show became a success after the initial run as a five-episode miniseries, the producers decided to expand the roles of certain characters. They introduced Lucy Ewing's (Charlene Tilton) parents, who had not been shown on-screen until that point, in the two-part episode "The Reunion". After the success of Dallas, Jacobs presented his initial idea again and created Knots Landing, with some alterations of his original script. In an interview, Jacobs explained: " Well, that's pretty good, but you know-and then he pulled out the pages that we'd left for them a few years ago on Knots Landing, or a year before on Knots, and he said, 'Is there any way we can make this a spin-off?' I just took one of the couples and made it, you know, Val and Gary who had already been created on the parent series and putting them into the mix, but when you have four couples and you change one, you sort of have to change the dynamic all the way around. However, once I wrote the script, remarkably little changed from the script and the pilot as you would see it."

Gary Ewing was originally played by David Ackroyd on Dallas, but Ackroyd was unable to sign on for Knots Landing, and Ted Shackelford assumed the role. Joan Van Ark continued to play Val Ewing for the spin-off. Initially, it was presumed that Tilton would also be joining Knots Landing (and have Lucy move in with her parents to the Seaview Circle cul-de-sac), but the network decided to keep her on Dallas in order to keep the two shows separate. She did, however, make a guest appearance in the first-season episode "Home is for Healing".

The actors on Knots Landing had more input than actors on other 1980s primetime soaps. In 1987, the writers wanted Mack (Kevin Dobson) to have an extramarital affair with Anne (Michelle Phillips). Michele Lee, who played Mack's wife Karen, protested this to Jacobs, saying, "There has to be one stable couple on the show." The extramarital affair storyline was nixed, and Michelle Phillips, who had been signed to a contract, was written out for a couple of seasons before returning in 1990. When she did return, Anne did not pursue Mack. William Devane, who played Greg Sumner, re-wrote most of his character's dialogue, to the point where, in co-star Michele Lee's words, "most people (on set) were (probably) frightened of him". The Gary/Val/Abby triangle that provided story throughout the mid-1980s was suggested by Ted Shackelford and Joan Van Ark in 1980, and the producers hesitated for a year and a half before going through with it in 1982. The famous 1984 storyline where Valene's babies got kidnapped was originally envisioned as one of scheming Abby's plots. Donna Mills, who played Abby, acknowledged that her character was evil but did not think she was that evil. Fearing the audience would never forgive her character for kidnapping another woman's babies, she asked the writers to make the kidnappings a result of Abby's actions, but only by accident, and the writers complied. Bruce Campbell, who appeared in a 1987 episode, would later marvel at "the speed and clinical precision" of the production as opposed to the low-budget films and television series he had acted in up until this point. In particular, he wrote that Michele Lee (who directed several episodes) "ran the set like a drill seargent and laid out all the blocking."

The writing team of Bernard Lechowick and Lynn Marie Latham (the head writers from 1986 to 1991) was controversial among both fans and actors. Their humor-imbued style of writing made them the favorites of Michele Lee, while John Pleshette felt they were "awful people." Pleshette, however, was not a regular cast member during their tenure (only making a guest appearance in 1987), and harbored resentment because the writing team, who had been represented by his wife, moved to a different agency. Joan Van Ark, whose character was struck by a brain illness in season 12 and proceeded to thereafter go crazy, felt that Latham and Lechowick had turned her character into the "village idiot." Joan Van Ark's and Donna Mills' favorite Knots Landing writer was Peter Dunne, who was partly responsible for making Knots Landing a top ten show in 1984-85.

In 1987, CBS demanded that production costs be cut. This meant the firing of two regulars, Constance McCashin and Julie Harris. Season 13 saw a large ratings drop for the show after writer/producers Bernard Lechowick and Lynn Marie Latham left to create Homefront and creator David Jacobs had a health crisis and pulled back his involvement in production. Jacobs has publicly stated that the way he knew the show was in trouble was when waitresses at his favorite diner, whom he had heard gossiping about Knots Landing every Friday during past seasons, suddenly stopped discussing the show in late 1991. He attempted to save face by shutting down production on November 20, 1991, firing head writer John Romano, and replacing him with Ann Marcus. Cost cutting again plagued the series in its final season, when only 19 episodes were produced, and (with the exception of Michele Lee) regular cast members did not appear in every episode. Not wanting to compromise what he felt had been a good run, series creator David Jacobs described its end as a "mutual decision" between Knots Landing's producers and the CBS Network, saying, "We don't know if they would have picked us up anyway...but even if they had, we would have had to pare away more to survive."

The series' signature cul-de-sac, Seaview Circle, was actually Crystalaire Place in Granada Hills, California, a suburban street in Los Angeles' San Fernando Valley about 20 miles north of the Pacific Ocean. The opening credits during the first two seasons were edited in such a way to make it appear that the cul-de-sac was closer to the beach. The aerial shots as seen in the opening and end credits from 1981 to 1987, were filmed at Palos Verdes Estates, an affluent coastal area of Los Angeles.

== Music ==
The theme song, which lasted all 14 seasons was composed by Jerrold Immel. Immel, along with Craig Huxley composed the background music for the pilot. The original background music cues by Immel and Huxley were never fully abandoned by the show, and were heard right through until the final season. The early Knots Landing background music cues heavily emphasized the brass section, and were often played with a very sparse bass line accompaniment. It was the only aspect of the series ever to win an Emmy award, for the music orchestration during its 1979–80 season.

By the debut of the fourth season in 1982 the lushness of the 1980s was in full swing and background cues were changed to reflect that style. The new dramatic cues emphasized full orchestral arrangements as formerly middle-class Knots Landing became upwardly mobile. The background music of seasons 4–7 was frequently composed by either Lance Rubin or Ron Grant.

Season 8 in 1986 introduced a completely new score for the show. New wave artists and bands had taken America by storm and the new style of music cues made good use of the synthesizer instead of a full orchestra. Bruce Miller was one of the main composers during this era. Updated orchestrations of the by-then familiar Lance Rubin cues were also re-arranged to be played by the synthesizer, and the Immel/Huxley cues were similarly utilized, albeit less commonly.

In the early 1990s, soft contemporary acoustic music became popular and Knots Landing began incorporating this into its background music during season 12. Lance Rubin's music cues were mostly phased out at this point. Patrick Gleeson and Kennard Ramsey composed during this period.

== Opening credits ==
Knots Landing had five completely different styles of opening credits over its 14 years.

- (December 27, 1979 – March 26, 1981) The original opening of Knots Landing designed by Wayne Fitzgerald features a rotating aerial shot of a California beach which dissolves to a rotating aerial shot of roads and houses, gradually zooming in to a freeze-frame of the Seaview Circle cul-de-sac. The camera then zooms in to the top of each house in turn, showing a brief shot of the residents of each home. Photo credits for each of the main actors then appear superimposed over the shape of the cul-de-sac. In the pilot, however, it had the photo credits of the main actors shown superimposed over the house each of their characters live in.
- (November 12, 1981 – May 14, 1987) Knots Landing unveiled a new opening at the start of season 3. In what is probably the best-remembered introduction, the sequence designed by Gene Kraft begins with a fast-moving aerial shot of the ocean which then tilts up as it approaches the coastline, and the series title appears. The picture, except for the title, fades to black, and the title scrolls from right to left followed by a montage of clips of the show playing in small boxes. Each cast member is credited below a larger box showcasing a close-up of their character, accompanied by three or four smaller boxes showing that character in scenes with other characters.
- (September 24, 1987 – May 18, 1989) At the beginning of the ninth season, Knots Landing's producers decided to break tradition with the opening. The intro designed by Sandy Dvore now features a slow-panning shot over a painting similar to the splattered style of Jackson Pollock. As the zig-zag panning continues, the cast montage appears, featuring black-and-white shots of the actors inside of small ovular cameos. The posed cameos were dropped in the 1988–89 season in favor of color close-ups taken from episodes of the show.
- (September 28, 1989 – May 17, 1990) The eleventh season of Knots Landing saw the show unveil its fourth title sequence. The new opening designed by Castle/Bryant/Johnsen now showcases sandcastle structures of the cul-de-sac houses as well as some skyscrapers representing Los Angeles on a beach. It is the only version of the opening without pictures of the cast. The camera twists through this sandcastle community with only the actors' names appearing. From the second episode of this season, the opening splits in two. The cutting takes place during the staff credits. The main theme is adapted as well. Between the two parts of the opening is presented a summary of events in the past episodes.
- (September 13, 1990 – May 13, 1993) To redefine the show for the 1990s, Knots Landing made one final change to the opening credits by returning to the famous horizontal scrolling clips style, though with faster-moving, color-framed boxes which moved at different speeds and overlapped each other, concluding with a shot of the sandcastle models of the cul-de-sac and Los Angeles from the previous title sequence. This version was designed by Castle/Bryant/Johnsen to be "safe" for the 1990s.

== Nielsen ratings ==
Though not as popular in the ratings as its parent series, Knots Landing eventually outlasted it and garnered much critical acclaim. The series peaked during the 1983–84 season with a 20.8 rating (when it finished in 11th place) and a 20.0 rating for the 1984–85 season (finishing 9th). This can be attributed, in part, to more dramatic storylines as the series became more soap opera-like, and the gradual inclusion of newer characters to interact with the original cast. By the 1988–89 season, Knots Landing was ahead of Dallas in the ratings, though audiences for both shows by this time were less than their earlier years. Knots Landing ended in 1993, two years after Dallas ended.

| Season | Premiere | Finale | Episodes | Timeslot | Rank | Rating | Households (in millions) |
|---|---|---|---|---|---|---|---|
| 1979–80 | December 27, 1979 | March 27, 1980 | 13 | Thursday at 10:00–11:00 pm (Episodes 1–4, 6–13); Friday at 10:00–11:00 pm (Episode 5) | #30 | 20.0 | 15.3 |
| 1980–81 | November 20, 1980 | March 26, 1981 | 18 | Thursday at 10:00–11:00 pm (Episodes 1–16, 18); Thursday at 9:00–10:00 pm (Episode 17) | #28 | 19.0 | 15.2 |
| 1981–82 | November 12, 1981 | May 6, 1982 | 22 | Thursday at 9:00–10:00 pm (Episodes 1–15); Thursday at 10:00–11:00 pm (Episodes 16–22) | #43 | 15.3 | —N/a |
| 1982–83 | September 30, 1982 | March 10, 1983 | 22 | Thursday at 10:00–11:00 pm (Episodes 1–5, 7–22); Friday at 10:00–11:00 pm (Episode 6) | #20 | 18.6 | 15.5 |
| 1983–84 | September 29, 1983 | March 29, 1984 | 25 | Thursday at 10:00–11:00 pm | #11 | 20.8 | 17.4 |
| 1984–85 | October 4, 1984 | May 23, 1985 | 30 | Thursday at 10:00–11:00 pm | #9 | 20.0 | 17.4 |
| 1985–86 | September 19, 1985 | May 18, 1986 | 30 | Thursday at 10:00–11:00 pm | #17 | 16.7 | 16.8 |
| 1986–87 | September 18, 1986 | May 7, 1987 | 30 | Thursday at 9:00–10:00 pm (Episodes 1, 3–10); Thursday at 10:00–11:00 pm (Episodes 2, 11–30) | #26 | 16.8 | 14.7 |
| 1987–88 | September 24, 1987 | May 12, 1988 | 29 | Thursday at 10:00–11:00 pm | #31 | 15.8 | —N/a |
| 1988–89 | October 27, 1988 | May 18, 1989 | 28 | Thursday at 10:00–11:00 pm (Episodes 1–26, 28); Thursday at 9:00–10:00 pm (Episode 27) | #28 | 16.1 | 14.6 |
| 1989–90 | September 28, 1989 | May 11, 1990 | 29 | Thursday at 10:00–11:00 pm | #29 | 14.3 | 13.4 |
| 1990–91 | September 13, 1990 | May 16, 1991 | 27 | Thursday at 10:00–11:00 pm (Episodes 1–25, 27); Thursday at 9:00–10:00 pm (Episode 26) | #35 | 13.6 | —N/a |
| 1991–92 | September 12, 1991 | April 9, 1992 | 22 | Thursday at 10:00–11:00 pm | #47 | 12.3 | —N/a |
| 1992–93 | October 29, 1992 | May 13, 1993 | 19 | Thursday at 10:00–11:00 pm (Episodes 1–17, 19); Thursday at 9:00–10:00 pm (Episode 18) | #42 | 11.5 | —N/a |

== Reruns ==
Reruns of Knots Landing were first packaged into syndication for off-network broadcast in local markets by Lorimar in 1985. Before the show opening, each episode was preceded by a "Lorimar Presents" logo, followed by a narrated recap of the previous episode with the theme music played under. The first 190 episodes (the first eight seasons) were packaged in this manner, but only the first 160 episodes (the first seven seasons) were syndicated to local stations.

Knots Landing later appeared on the cable channel TNT in September 1992 and ran through May 1993; as with the syndicated run, only the first 160 episodes (the first seven seasons) were broadcast. TNT would later become the first network to broadcast all 344 episodes of Knots Landing during its second syndication run of the series beginning in 1995.

SOAPnet later acquired the rights to the series when it first went on the air in January 2000. Knots Landing has not been seen in United States syndication since SOAPnet quit broadcasting it in 2005.

=== International reruns ===
The UK satellite channel CBS Drama began airing the series in its entirety starting from April 1, 2013. This was the first time the show had been rerun in the UK since the early 2000s when it was shown on UK Gold. Once CBS Drama completed the series in July 2014, the channel immediately began a second round of reruns, followed by a third in 2015.

RTÉ television in Ireland broadcast the first seven seasons in an early morning weekend slot in 2011.

== Home media ==
The first season of Knots Landing was released on DVD on March 28, 2006, in Region 1. Fans of the series lobbied Warner Home Video via an online petition at www.knotslanding.net for further releases, and Warner Home Video released season two on April 14, 2009. No further seasons have yet been announced for release.

As of 08/28/2024, Knots Landing season 1 became available for purchase on AppleTV; additionally, after a week of running the series 24/7, the first five seasons were released on demand from PlexTV in the United States.

| DVD season | No. of episodes | Region 1 | Region 2 | Region 4 | Comments |
|---|---|---|---|---|---|
| Season 1 | 13 | March 28, 2006 | February 19, 2007 | June 6, 2007 | The first-season DVD box set has five single-sided discs. The Region 1 and 2 releases include commentaries by actors Ted Shackelford and Joan Van Ark. The set also includes a featurette/clip from the 2005 Together Again non-fiction reunion show in which stars Ted Shackelford and Joan Van Ark reminisce about the series. |
| Season 2 | 18 | April 14, 2009 | October 16, 2009 (Germany) | TBA | The second-season DVD box set has four single-sided discs. There is no bonus material. |

All seasons and episodes available on Tubi as of 5/13/26 free.

== International broadcasts ==
- In the United Kingdom, the series premiered on BBC1 on 26 April 1980, in a primetime Saturday night slot. Season 2 began a year later on May 8, 1981, now in a Friday night slot. Season 3 did not begin until September 16, 1983, but only the first 13 episodes of the season were shown, at which point the BBC pulled the series from its Friday night slot with no immediate plans of showing any more episodes. The BBC then brought the series back in October 1986, picking up from the middle of season 3 where they last left off, but now it was screened in the afternoon as part of their new daytime line-up. The BBC continued to screen the series in an afternoon slot until the end, though UK audiences tended to be three to four years behind US audiences. The series concluded on the BBC in January 1996.
- In Australia, the series premiered on the Seven Network on February 4, 1981 in Sydney and June 25, 1981 in Melbourne. The series ended on August 2, 1993.
- In France, the show was known as Côte Ouest (translated as West Coast) and was first shown on TF1 in 1988 with a new lyrical theme song (composed by Haim Saban and Shuki Levy and sung in French by French male vocalist Claude Vallois). From 2000, the show was rerun from beginning to end on FoxLife, a now defunct satellite channel broadcasting on CanalSat provider.
- In Germany, the show was known as Unter der Sonne Kaliforniens (translated as Under the Californian Sun). The show began airing on ZDF on January 9, 1988.
- In the Philippines, the show was formerly aired on GMA 7.
- In Sweden, the show was called JRs bror – Gary Ewing (JR's brother – Gary Ewing). The series premiered in 1988 on TV3.
- In Ireland, the show was not broadcast on terrestrial TV until 1989 (although viewers with access to BBC were able to watch earlier transmissions). RTÉ first broadcast the series daily in late 1989 as part of its early afternoon schedule. It proved to be popular and was eventually given an early evening timeslot in February 1991 when RTÉ moved the show (after showing the first nine seasons) from a daily afternoon timeslot, to a weekly primetime Thursday night slot on its sister channel Network Two (now RTÉ Two). All remaining episodes were shown without a break (the end of each season was followed by the first episode of the next season the following week) until Christmas 1993 when the final episode was broadcast followed by the retrospective Knots Landing Block Party.
- In Israel, the show aired from 1990 on The Family Channel (later on renamed as Channel 3) on Cable TV on Fridays evenings at 19:00 for the first four seasons. Later on, it aired on Sundays at 21:45 for the season-and-a-half that followed, from February 1992. In November 1992, the show was rerun from the beginning, every weekday evening at 20:45. All 14 seasons had aired by 1994. Back To The Cul-De-Sac aired as a holiday special in autumn 1997.
- In Egypt, the series would start broadcast on Egyptian Channel 2 in the early 1990s and would continue to air for several years along with its contemporary Falcon Crest.
- In Italy, the first season was named Da Dallas a Knots Landing (translated: "From Dallas to Knots Landing") though was eventually rebroadcast with the definitive name of "California". Only nine seasons were aired and 214 episodes, minus the last five episodes of the ninth season, probably dubbed, but not broadcast.
- In Spain, the series was aired by the regional channels under the FORTA umbrella. The series did not arrive in Spain until at least 1992, and initially was only aired in various regions, normally in a weekday afternoon slot accompanying Dallas which also arrived late in Spain. Neither series completed their run in Spain and neither have been rescreened there in full or in part.
- In Portugal, the series aired daily on SIC in 1993, in a mid-afternoon timeslot. Unlike other Lorimar soaps, the series was never before broadcast on RTP.
- In New Zealand, the series aired during much of the 1980s, initially in primetime, but later in the decade once a week during the afternoon on TV One, after the daytime soaps The Young and the Restless and Days of Our Lives.
- In Finland, the series was aired by a regional channel, Helsinki TV, in mid-1980.
- In Trinidad and Tobago, the series aired through most of the 1980s on TTT.
- In Venezuela, the series was on Venezolana de Television (the officially run Venezuelan TV Network), and was titled Vecinos y Amigos (Neighbors and Friends).
- In Namibia (originally known as South West Africa), the series was played on SWABC and was only shown until 1985.
- In the United Arab Emirates, the series was shown on its English-language network Dubai 33.
- In Guyana, the series was transmitted on NBTV Channel 9 and later on WRHM Channel 7. The series first aired in December 1994 (as television in Guyana didn't start until 1991) and lasted until February 1997.
- In Kenya, the series was broadcast on KBC (originally called VOK "Voice of Kenya" at the time).
- In Hong Kong, the series premiered on RTV on May 6, 1980, and aired on the channel of that name until July 24, 1982, where it later changed its name to ATV on September 24 in the same year. The show later returned to Hong Kong television on August 27, 1985, and continued airing on ATV until June 28, 1991.
- In Norway, the series first began airing on TV3 in 1988.

== Legacy ==
In the 2005 Knots Landing Reunion special, the cast along with creator David Jacobs, said that the lasting legacy of the show was their dealings with many of the issues real middle-class people were having. While its parent show Dallas was a show about the rich upper class, Knots Landing had this aspect as well but was much more about the struggles of parenting, drug addictions, spousal issues and many of the evolving problems in the 1980s and early '90s. The reunion special showed such subjects as: women's power in the workforce, the HIV/AIDS crisis and the matter of safe sex, the cocaine epidemic in the 1980s, and the ever-growing spread of crime in America (Michele Lee's character Karen alluded to this in a famous speech about not feeling safe and being happy being a Pollyanna).

Screenwriter Alan Ball declared the show had been an inspiration to him when he created the hit series Six Feet Under, describing his show as "Knots Landing set in a funeral home".

Screenwriter Marc Cherry also confirmed the show was an inspiration to him when he created the hit series Desperate Housewives, describing it as a cross between Knots Landing, American Beauty and Twin Peaks.

British writer/producer Phil Redmond stated that his long-running primetime soap opera Brookside (1982-2003), which is set in a middle-class cul-de-sac in Liverpool, was partly influenced by Knots Landing.

When asked which character from film and TV history he wished he had created, Mike Kelley, the creator of ABC's popular primetime soap opera Revenge, said: "Abby Ewing. Donna Mills, you rocked my world."

In January 2025, it was announced that a rewatch podcast was in the works from Donna Mills, Joan Van Ark, and Michele Lee. We're Knot Done Yet launched in April 2025, hosted by Mills, Van Ark, and Lee, "not only reflect[ing] on their groundbreaking Knots Landing roles, but on the lifelong friendships that blossomed on set and the incredible impact they've had on each other's lives. From behind-the-scenes stories to personal milestones over the last 40 years, they share laughs, memories, and the bond that has kept them close through it all."

== See also ==
- List of Knots Landing episodes
