= Robert F. Lyons (actor) =

American actor (born 1939)

- Born: Robert Francis Lyons; October 17, 1939 (age 86); Albany, New York, U.S.
- Occupation: Actor
- Years active: 1966–present

Robert Francis Lyons (born October 17, 1939) is an American actor of film and television. He is best known for guest starring in numerous popular television shows since the 1960s and for appearing in such films as Getting Straight (1970), Dark Night of the Scarecrow (1981), Death Wish II (1982), Murphy's Law (1986) and Platoon Leader (1988).

== Career ==
Lyons made his screen debut in the television series I Dream of Jeannie and made his film debut in Pendulum (1969), followed by Getting Straight (1970). Since then he has appeared in such films as Shoot Out (1971) (as the main villain, opposite good guy Gregory Peck), Avenging Angel (1985) and Pray for Morning (2006) and such television shows as Gunsmoke, Medical Center, Falcon Crest, Roswell and Criminal Minds. In 1999 he played Dr Lester Arnold on Days of Our Lives. In 2015 he co-starred with Danny Trejo in the zombie film The Burning Dead.

== Selected TV and filmography ==
- 1966: Days of Our Lives (TV Series) as Dr. Lester Arnold (1999)
- 1966–1973: The F.B.I (TV Series) as John Brackney / Lon Owens / Ronald Loper
- 1967: Bonanza (TV Series) as Sandy
- 1967: Gunsmoke (TV Series) as Maxwell
- 1967: The Monkees (TV Series) as Smasher
- 1968: Judd, for the Defense (TV Series) as Archie Fryell
- 1969: Pendulum as Paul Sanderson
- 1969: Land of the Giants (TV Series) as Nalor
- 1970: Getting Straight as Nick
- 1970: Ironside (TV Series) as Garvie Durko
- 1970–1972: Medical Center (TV Series) as Pete / David Drayton
- 1971: Shoot Out as Bobby Jay Jones
- 1971: The Todd Killings as Skipper Todd
- 1972: Dealing: Or the Berkeley-to-Boston Forty-Brick Lost-Bag Blues (TV Movie) as Peter
- 1974: The Disappearance of Flight 412 as Captain Cliff Riggs
- 1974: Paper Moon (TV series) as Clyde Barrow
- 1977: Black Oak Conspiracy as Harrison Hancock
- 1978: The Ghost of Flight 401 (TV Movie) as Bill Bowdish
- 1979: Death Car on the Freeway (TV Movie) as Barry Hill
- 1979–1981: The Incredible Hulk (TV Series) as Sam / Joe Conti
- 1980: Quincy M.E. (TV Series) as Bob Denvo
- 1980: Fantasy Island (TV Series) as Carl
- 1980–1981: CHiPs (TV Series) as Arnold / Toro
- 1981: Gangster Wars as Legs Diamond
- 1981: Dark Night of the Scarecrow (TV Movie) as Skeeter Norris
- 1981–1982: Falcon Crest (TV Series) as Turner Bates
- 1982: Death Wish II as Fred McKenzie
- 1982: Magnum, P.I. as Taylor Hurst
- 1983: 10 to Midnight as Nathan Zager
- 1983–1985: Matt Houston (TV Series) as Wade Kimball / Perry Brandon
- 1984: Simon & Simon (TV Series) as Frank Gaul
- 1985: Avenging Angel as Lt. Hugh Andrews
- 1985: Cease Fire as Luke
- 1985: Knight Rider (TV Series) as Jeff Cavanaugh
- 1986: Murphy's Law as Art Penney
- 1987: Murder, She Wrote (TV Series) as Steve Honig
- 1988: Platoon Leader as Sgt. Michael McNamara
- 1989: American Eagle as Rudy Argente
- 1989: Prime Suspect as Sheriff Hank Fallon
- 1994: The Dragon Gate as Jack the Drunk
- 1995: Ripper Man as Frankel
- 1996: Walker, Texas Ranger (TV Series) as Duncan McCallum
- 1996: Exit in Red as Detective Vollers
- 1997: Pensacola: Wings of Gold as Addison's Father
- 1998: Mike Hammer, Private Eye as Joe Rollins
- 1999–2000 Roswell (TV Series) as Hank Whitmore
- 1999: The Omega Code as General
- 2001: Family Law (TV Series) as Judge Christie
- 2004: Love's Enduring Promise (TV Movie) as Doc Watkins
- 2005: Silent Partner as U.S. Vice President
- 2006: Pray for Morning as Proctor
- 2006: Cold Case (TV Series) as Scott "Skiz" Stenkovic (2006)
- 2006: Cut Off as Dick
- 2009–2011: Criminal Minds (TV Series) as Bartender / Mr Donovan
- 2010: Confession as Mac
- 2011: Peach Plum Pear as Hank
- 2015: The Burning Dead as Old Ben
