= 100 Monkeys =

Funk rock band from Los Angeles, California

The 100 Monkeys
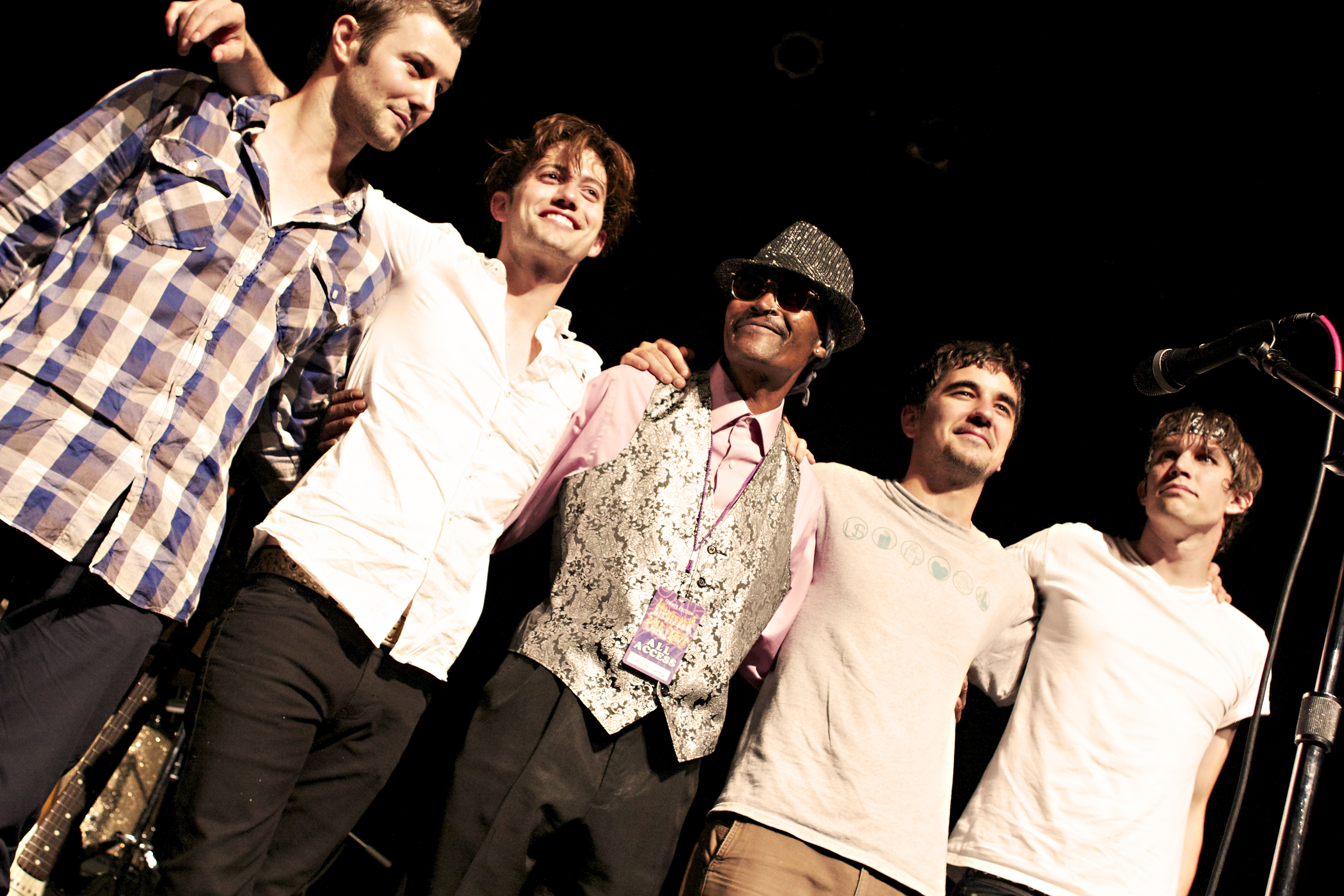
- 100 Monkeys in Indianapolis, June 29, 2011.

Background information
- Origin: Los Angeles, California, United States
- Genre: Funk Rock
- Years active: 2008–2012
- Labels: Awesome Sauce Records, Warrior Records
- Spinoffs: Pink Fuzzy Animals Mechanical People
- Past members: Jackson Rathbone; Ben Graupner; Ben Johnson; Jerad Anderson; Lawrence Abrams
- Website: The Official 100 Monkeys Road Trip! www.facebook.com/100MonkeysMusic
- = Associated Acts = Spencer Bell; The Stevedores; The Bleeding Horse Express; Jake Miller; Not A Planet; Evro; Shawn Fernando; Three Trees; Rob Coonrod; Anna Morsett

100 Monkeys was an independent funk rock band from Los Angeles, California. The members of the group, from 2008 until their disbandment in 2012, were Ben Graupner, Jackson Rathbone, Jerad Anderson, Ben Johnson, and Lawrence Abrams. The band name comes from the idea of the "hundredth monkey effect".

== History ==
The group came together in 2008 in Los Angeles, California, playing small shows at the 24K Lounge and other places in Los Angeles. Their first album, Monster De Lux, was entirely improvised and was done in one long take. Their second self-released album, Creative Control Sessions, featured popular songs "Sleeping Giants" and "Gus" and was produced by Scott Coslett. During a small tour from May through June 2009, the band played dates in PA and NY and in June released three singles of studio mastered songs – "Ugly Girl", "Smoke" and "Wasteland Too". Their first studio album, "Grape" was released in 2009. The band then toured the West Coast. In 2010, the band embarked on a 100 City Tour across the United States, an effort which has greatly increased their audience.

The band's sound has been described as funk rock by Spin. They have described the meaning behind their lyrics to be inspired by "drinking, the devil, death and women who cheat and steal." Due to their recent fame the group has been interviewed by various music magazines and television networks. Their music is said to have a blues like feel, and their performances give off a '60s-like vibe, mimicking bands such as the Beatles. Their sound has also been described by MTV.com as a blend of "Iggy Pop with the Raconteurs."

In 2010 the band also released Live And Kickin: Part Too, a documentary companion to their Live And Kickin: Part One live album.

The band signed with Warrior Records in 2011 and released their second studio album June 28, 2011, entitled Liquid Zoo. They will embark on a summer tour spanning all of North America and parts of Canada. The tour will be supported by Vancouver band The Bleeding Horse Express which has a forthcoming album produced by Rathbone. The Tour kicked off with an album release party in Cincinnati, Ohio, and will wrap up exactly two months later in San Diego, CA.

On March 4, 2012 100 Monkeys announced that Jackson Rathbone and Jerad Anderson would be taking a leave from the band. Anderson stated that he hoped to return eventually after working on some film projects for his company Wayne/Lauren Film Company, but Rathbone was suspected to be permanently replaced after the announcement of his girlfriend's pregnancy.

100 Monkeys toured the west coast during April 2012 in support for their new single, "City Of Bones", which debuted March 12, 2012.

On April 13, 2012, fans were told to click a link from 100 Monkeys Twitter account that led them to the information that former bandmate Jackson Rathbone and his lawyers had informed the band that the name "100 Monkeys" can no longer be used by remaining band members. The official website for 100 Monkeys has since been closed down and Lawrence Abrams has left the band as well, leaving Ben Johnson and Ben Graupner as the last two members of the original line up. Two new members, Matt Black and Rob Coonrod, have joined the band since it was announced that Jackson Rathbone and Jerad Anderson were leaving.

== Members ==
The group's members vary from movie producers to actors.

Ben Graupner plays trumpet, guitar, drums, keyboard, and bass guitar, and sings vocals for the band. He was born in Dallas, Texas, on February 7. He has had small roles in a few movies including Trapped in the 5150 and Devolved. He is also the lead vocalist for the band Mechanical People, which also included Ben Johnson and friend Jake Miller.

Jackson Rathbone was born in Singapore City, Singapore on December 14, 1984. He later moved to Texas with his family where he pursued his love of music. He studied acting at Interlochen Center For The Arts, in Interlochen, Michigan, during high school. He gained prominence as an actor with the popularity of the movie series Twilight and the 2010 film The Last Airbender. Jackson plays the guitar, bass, drums, keyboard, mandolin, trumpet, harmonica and is on vocals.

Jerad Anderson was born in San Diego, California, on June 4, 1981. He is a budding actor, having a guest role as Jonah Perkins in the hit ABC Family show Greek as well as several other movies and television shows. Jerad plays guitar and background vocals for the group. Like other members of the band, he also alternates between bass, keyboard, and drums. Jerad is owner of Wayne/Lauren Film Company which in 2010 produced the movie Girlfriend, starring Evan Sneider, which co-starred Anderson and Rathbone and was scored by the band.

Ben Johnson was born May 4, 1984, in Mt. Carroll, Illinois. He plays drums, bass, guitar, keyboard, and vocals for 100 Monkeys. He has produced several albums of music by Spencer Bell, a long time friend that passed from adrenal cancer in 2006.

M. Lawrence "Uncle Larry" Abrams is the band percussionist, and plays flute, bass, saxophone, and occasionally vocals. Lawrence was born in Chicago, Illinois, on July 5, 1953.

== Influence ==
The band states that their greatest influences are David Bowie and Gary Busey.

== Improv ==
100 Monkeys performs an improvised song at each concert, based upon an audience idea and chosen by Jerad Anderson. Lyrics are typically created by Jackson Rathbone in real time with all band members varying on which instruments they play.

== Discography ==
=== Albums ===
Year	Album
2009	Monster de Lux
2009	Creative Control Live
2009	Grape
2010	Live and Kickin Part One: 1. "The Fair"; 2. "Orson Brawl"; 3. "Kolpix"; 4. "Made of Gold"; 5. "Ugly Girl"; 6. "Little Black Book"; 7. "Looker"; 8. "Shock and Fight"; 9. "Grocery Store No More"; 10. "Wings on Fire"; 11. "Sleeping Giants"; 12. "LDF"; 13. "Wasteland Too"
2011	Liquid Zoo

=== Singles ===
- 2009: "Smoke"
- 2009: "Wasteland Too"
- 2009: "Ugly Girl"
- 2009: "Keep Awake"
- 2010: "Kolpix"
- 2010: "Future Radio"
- 2010: "Wandering Mind"
