= List of Dallas episodes =

Dallas is an American prime time television soap opera that revolves around the Ewings, a wealthy Texas family in the oil and cattle-ranching industries. The show was famous for its cliffhangers, including the "Who shot J.R.?" mystery and the "Dream Season".

The original miniseries (consisting of five episodes) from 1978 is now presented as "Season 1" in keeping with the initial release on DVD in 2004, although originally Season 1 officially began with the episode that aired on September 23, 1978. This article has been reformatted to list episodes by the current convention rather than original designation. Between 1978 and 1991, 357 episodes aired over 14 seasons, in addition to three made-for-television movies that aired in 1986, 1996 and 1998.

== Series overview ==
Season	Episodes	Originally released		Rank	Viewers (in ratings points)
Season	Episodes	First released	Last released	Rank	Viewers (in ratings points)
1	5	April 2, 1978	April 30, 1978	42	19.0
2	24	September 23, 1978	April 6, 1979	40	18.4
3	25	September 21, 1979	March 21, 1980	5	20.0
4	23	November 7, 1980	May 1, 1981	1	27.6
5	26	October 9, 1981	April 9, 1982	1	23.2
6	28	October 1, 1982	May 6, 1983	2	20.5
7	30	September 30, 1983	May 18, 1984	1	21.5
8	30	September 28, 1984	May 17, 1985	2	20.97
9	31	September 27, 1985	May 16, 1986	6	18.8
10	29	September 26, 1986	May 15, 1987	11	18.6
11	30	September 25, 1987	May 13, 1988	21	15.2
12	26	October 28, 1988	May 19, 1989	30	13.9
13	27	September 22, 1989	May 11, 1990	43	—N/a
14	23	November 2, 1990	May 3, 1991	61	—N/a

== Episodes ==
=== Mini series (Season 1) (1978) ===
No. overall	No. in season	Title	Directed by	Written by	Original U.S. air date	Original U.K. air date	Rating/share (households)
1	1	"Digger's Daughter"	Robert Day	David Jacobs	April 2, 1978	September 5, 1978	21.5/37
Bobby Ewing (Patrick Duffy) and Pamela Barnes Ewing (Victoria Principal) reveal to their families that they are married. This renews the longtime rivalry between the Ewings and the Barneses. J.R. (Larry Hagman) attempts to break up Bobby and Pam by recruiting her former flame: the Ewings' ranch foreman, Ray Krebbs (Steve Kanaly).
2	2	"The Lesson"	Irving J. Moore	Virginia Aldrige	April 9, 1978	September 12, 1978	15.2/26
Pam attempts to win acceptance at Southfork by intervening in Lucy's life when she discovers Lucy has been skipping school and having an affair with Ray Krebbs.
3	3	"Spy in the House"	Robert Day	Arthur Bernard Lewis	April 16, 1978	September 19, 1978	15.8/26
J.R. has suspected that Pam's marriage to Bobby was a Barnes attempt to plant a mole inside the Ewing lair. Now he may have proof.
4	4	"Winds of Vengeance"	Irving J. Moore	Camille Marchetta	April 23, 1978	Not Broadcast on the BBC	21.2/37
A hurricane threatens Southfork, but an even bigger storm is about to hit when Miss Ellie, Pam, Sue Ellen and Lucy become captives of men who are more than a little annoyed with J.R. and Ray's affairs with the women in their lives. Special Guest Star: Brian Dennehy as Luther Frick
5	5	"Barbecue"	Robert Day	David Jacobs	April 30, 1978	September 26, 1978	21.8/36
Hostility is the main course at the Ewing barbecue as Jock and Digger jab at old wounds, but Pam and Bobby use Pam's pregnancy as a truce between the prospective grandfathers. Tensions run high as J.R. and Bobby argue, which leads to an accident nobody expected. As a result, Pam's health and the future of the Ewing dynasty are in jeopardy.

=== Season 2 (1978–79) ===
No. overall	No. in season	Title	Directed by	Written by	Original U.S. air date	Original U.K. air date	Rating/share (households)
6	1	"Reunion – Part 1"	Irving J. Moore	David Jacobs	September 23, 1978	October 3, 1978	12.5/23
Bobby talks Gary into returning to Southfork after a long absence. Jimmy takes Lucy to the diner in Fort Worth where her mother Valene is working.
7	2	"Reunion – Part 2"	Irving J. Moore	David Jacobs	September 30, 1978	October 10, 1978	12.8/25
J.R pretends to help his younger brother by including him in some Ewing Oil business with a company that is expected to fail. Gary succumbs to the pressure and leaves Southfork. J.R. blackmails Valene into leaving by paying her off.
8	3	"Old Acquaintance"	Alex March	Camille Marchetta	October 7, 1978	October 17, 1978	12.9/22
Bobby's first love, Jenna Wade, re-enters his life needing his help after being exposed as the mistress of businessman Maynard Anderson. Bobby believes her daughter Charlie might be his, but Jenna will not confirm.
9	4	"Bypass"	Corey Allen	Arthur Bernard Lewis	October 14, 1978	October 24, 1978	14.3/26
Bobby doesn't like the way J.R. does business and questions his own role at Ewing Oil. Jock confronts J.R. leading to a heart attack. Bobby deals with his father's illness by joining Ray at Southfork. Jock knows J.R. is not telling him everything, and wants Bobby back at Ewing Oil. The operation goes fine, and Jock wonders about Bobby's role in the company. Bobby continues working at Southfork leaving Ewing Oil solely in J.R.'s hands.
10	5	"Black Market Baby"	Lawrence Dobkin	Darlene Craviotto	October 15, 1978	October 31, 1978	16.1/23
Sue Ellen is worried Pam will produce the next Ewing heir before her, so she decides to adopt. Sue Ellen finds a young woman named Rita who is willing to give up her baby and she unexpectedly forms a maternal relationship with her. J.R. finds out about the plan and has Rita transported out of state. He wants an heir as much as Sue Ellen, but tells her it has to be "our child, not somebody else's". Meanwhile, Bobby and Pam have their own problem when Pam is offered a job, but Bobby doesn't believe that she should work. They become at odds, but Bobby makes up by buying her a new car. NOTE: Due to low viewer ratings, with this episode, the series moves from Saturday night airings back to Sundays in the United States.
11	6	"Double Wedding"	Paul Stanley	Jim Inman and Arthur Bernard Lewis	October 21, 1978	November 7, 1978	15.1/30
Pam's ex-husband, Ed Haynes, shows up in Dallas causing conflict in Bobby and Pam's marriage. Ed was away in Vietnam when Pam got the divorce and claims he never got the papers. This would mean that he and Pam are still married. Bobby unravels the scheme by tracking down Haynes' partner and locating a copy of the annulment papers.
12	7	"Runaway"	Barry Crane	Worley Thorne	October 29, 1978	November 14, 1978	17.4/30
Lucy wants to invite her mother to her birthday party. Jock does not want Valene on the ranch so Lucy tries to explain that J.R. lied and her mother never took the bribe, but Jock stands firm. Lucy leaves and is picked up by a con man, Willie Guest, who initially includes Lucy in some of his schemes but Lucy does not cooperate and he kidnaps her. Bobby and the police track them down and Lucy returns safely.
13	8	"Election"	Barry Crane	Rena Down	November 5, 1978	November 21, 1978	15.5/26
Pam works on Cliff's campaign to run for state senator while Jock orders Bobby to work on Cliff's opponent's campaign. J.R. tricks Pam into revealing damaging information from Cliff's past that leads to a political scandal and defeat for Cliff. A furious Pam confronts Jock and J.R. and vows to make them pay for hurting her brother.
14	9	"Survival"	Irving J. Moore	D. C. Fontana, Richard Fontana	November 12, 1978	November 28, 1978	21.0/38
During a storm, J.R. and Bobby's plane crashes. The news gets to Ellie first, and worried about Jock's heart condition, she insists the news be kept from him. As J.R. and Bobby fight for survival, the Ewing women contemplate life without them in it. Miss Ellie confronts a reporter who comes to Southfork, Jock overhears the conversation and is furious that the news has been kept from him.
15	10	"Act of Love"	Corey Allen	Leonard Katzman	November 19, 1978	December 12, 1978	16.2/25
J.R. goes to Washington, D.C. for lobbying and extra curricular activities. Jock, recuperating, takes on temporary leadership duties at Ewing Oil. Sue Ellen spends more time with Cliff Barnes, then receives an important call from her doctor telling her she is pregnant. Offered a promotion at the store, Pam debates between a Paris shopping trip and Bobby's party.
16	11	"Triangle"	Vincent McEveety	Camille Marchetta	November 26, 1978	December 19, 1978	17.7/28
Ray has become serious about country singer Garnet McGee. When Jock leaves Ray some land at Southfork, he pops the question to Garnet. Garnet wants more than Ray can offer and hooks up with J.R., who negotiates a music contract for her. Coming back from Sacramento on J.Rs information about a cow for sale that is untrue Lucy tells him that J.R is after Garnet, Ray is furious and heads for Garnet’s. He finds J.R. with her and a fight begin he tells Bobby he is leaving Southfork.
17	12	"Fallen Idol"	Vincent McEveety	Arthur Bernard Lewis	December 3, 1978	December 5, 1978	21.9/35
Bobby's old friend Guzzler Bennett returns to Dallas wanting Bobby to join him in a construction venture. The plan is to build a shopping mall on Southfork. Ellie wants no part of a shopping mall and J.R. has other plans for the land. NOTE: This episode aired in the UK before the episodes "Act of Love" and "Triangle".
18	13	"Kidnapped"	Lawrence Dobkin	Camille Marchetta	December 17, 1978	January 9, 1979	22.1/38
Kidnappers going after J.R. end up taking Bobby instead. The kidnappers want to use Cliff Barnes as the go-between, but J.R. cannot stay out of it. J.R. overhears Cliff setting up a time to do the switch and he and Ray try to save Bobby.
19	14	"Home Again"	Don McDougall	Arthur Bernard Lewis	January 7, 1979	January 16, 1979	25.7/39
Ellie's brother Garrison, presumed dead, shows up at Southfork. Ellie, knowing the ranch was supposed to be his, tells the family she will be giving Southfork to Garrison. The family is not happy.
20	15	"For Love or Money"	Irving J. Moore	Leonard Katzman	January 14, 1979	January 23, 1979	19.6/30
Sue Ellen's mother and sister arrive in Dallas. Sue Ellen catches J.R. with another woman, so she moves in with her family. J.R. is not happy, but finally decides he wants his wife home, even if the baby she is carrying is not his.
21	16	"Julie's Return"	Leslie H. Martinson	Rena Down	January 26, 1979	January 30, 1979	19.9/35
Julie Grey, Jock's former secretary, arrives back in Dallas, and Jock is thrilled to spend time with her and they renew their relationship. Fearing Jock is having an affair with Julie, J.R. tells his mother. Ellie tries to stop what is going on, but Jock leaves to see Julie. Once Jock leaves, J.R. shows up at Julie's door. Julie promises to keep causing trouble for J.R., but he tells her not to count on it. NOTE: With this episode, the series moves from Sunday night airings to Fridays in the United States. Dallas will remain a Friday night fixture on the CBS Television Network for the remainder of its original run.
22	17	"The Red File – Part 1"	Leonard Katzman	Arthur Bernard Lewis	February 2, 1979	February 13, 1979	18.6/32
J.R. is not happy that Cliff is back in public office. He attempts to use Julie to get information about Cliff. She is tired of J.R. and decides she will help Cliff instead, offering him all the Ewing secrets. Cliff heads to Julie's, but does not find her. After a run in with Ames and Garr from the cartel, Julie ends up dead, having fallen from the roof of her building. J.R. uses his influence to have Cliff booked for her murder. Pam walks out of Southfork into a Hotel.
23	18	"The Red File – Part 2"	Leonard Katzman	Arthur Bernard Lewis	February 9, 1979	February 20, 1979	21.7/38
After the shock death of Julie Grey, Pam is sure that J.R. is framing Cliff so she leaves Bobby and Southfork. Bobby is determined to save his marriage and starts investigating to help Cliff.
24	19	"Sue Ellen's Sister"	Irving J. Moore	Camille Marchetta	February 16, 1979	February 27, 1979	21.1/36
Cliff gets Ewing Oil information out of Sue Ellen then uses Pam in the Barnes-Ewing feud. Meanwhile, Sue Ellen's sister Kristin visits Southfork and with Pam away she makes a play for Bobby. Lucy and J.R. both see through Kristin, Lucy discourages Kristin but J.R. encourages her.
25	20	"Call Girl"	Leslie H. Martinson	Rena Down	February 23, 1979	March 13, 1979	17.1/29
While still separated from Bobby, Pam makes friends with a model, Leanne Rees. Leanne happens to be a former prostitute and an old acquaintance of J.R., who creates a photo opportunity in which Pam looks like she too is into the world's oldest profession. Bobby finds out about J.R.'s scheme and brings Pam back to Southfork.
26	21	"Royal Marriage"	Gunnar Hellström	Camille Marchetta	March 9, 1979	March 20, 1979	21.2/37
When Lucy gets engaged to Kit Mainwaring J.R. is thrilled, the potential business merger with Mainwaring Oil could be beneficial for Ewing Oil. Unfortunately, Kit Mainwaring is gay. He eventually confesses this to Bobby and then to Lucy. Lucy is heartbroken, but stands by Kit and keeps the secret. Only she and Bobby know the truth. But, of course, J.R. knew all along.
27	22	"The Outsiders"	Dennis Donnelly	Leonard Katzman	March 16, 1979	March 27, 1979	19.2/35
Ray meets Donna Culver in a bar and begins an affair unaware that she is married to Jock's old friend Sam Culver, a powerful former politician, who Jock and J.R. enlist in their struggle against Cliff Barnes' vendetta against Ewing Oil. After her break up from Kit, Lucy turns to drugs.
28	23	"John Ewing III – Part 1"	Leonard Katzman	Camille Marchetta	March 23, 1979	April 10, 1979	23.5/43
Sue Ellen's battle with the bottle continues, despite her pregnancy. When Lucy and Sue Ellen are alone at Southfork, they have a meeting in which Sue Ellen ends up falling down the stairs. Lucy seems to have learned her lesson, but J.R. decides to put Sue Ellen, against her wishes, in a sanitarium.
29	24	"John Ewing III – Part 2"	Leonard Katzman	Arthur Bernard Lewis	April 6, 1979	April 17, 1979	23.9/42
Sue Ellen is not happy in the sanitarium. Bobby visits her and thinks that Cliff is the father of the baby punches him. She bribes a nurse for alcohol and leaves the sanitarium, and is involved in a car accident. She ends up in the hospital with the baby's life in danger. Cliff, thinking he is the father, rushes to the hospital.

=== Season 3 (1979–80) ===
No. overall	No. in season	Title	Directed by	Written by	Original U.S. air date	Original U.K. air date	Prod. code	Rating/share (households)
30	1	"Whatever Happened to Baby John?: Part 1"	Leonard Katzman	Camille Marchetta	September 21, 1979	November 17, 1979	188136	21.1/35
The happiness felt by the Ewing family on Sue Ellen's return from the hospital changes to concern when it becomes obvious she has little enthusiasm for anything, including her new baby. Bobby and Pam discover Cliff Barnes is continuing with his efforts to claim Sue Ellen and the baby as his. J.R. is surprised when two of his former business associates are paroled from jail.Baby John goes missing from the hospital.
31	2	"Whatever Happened to Baby John?: Part 2"	Leonard Katzman	Camille Marchetta	September 28, 1979	November 24, 1979	188137	21.9/38
Though Bobby thinks Cliff may have taken John Ross, this ends up not being true. J.R thinks some of his thugs may have taken the child, but they are all wrong. Pamela ends up solving the kidnapping mystery by remembering a woman, Priscilla Duncan, whom she saw several times staring at babies at the hospital. It turns out Priscilla lost her baby, and her husband ran out on her, leaving her desperate and alone, so she stole John Ross. The baby is finally returned to its natural parents, but Sue Ellen is not overly emotional about the outcome.
32	3	"The Silent Killer"	Irving J. Moore	Arthur Bernard Lewis	October 5, 1979	December 1, 1979	188139	18.5/31
Cliff Barnes flies his father, Digger, to Dallas to show him how he's getting even with the Ewings. But Digger's sudden medical problem places a cloud over Cliff, Pam, and even Sue Ellen's new baby. A doctor's examination discloses that Digger has a genetic disorder that has not only been passed to his children, Pam and Cliff, but also to their offspring, which could prove fatal to John Ewing III if Cliff is actually the father, as he firmly believes. Sue Ellen's mother Patricia Shepard and Kristin Shepard, Sue Ellen's younger sister, come to town.
33	4	"Secrets"	Leonard Katzman	Arthur Bernard Lewis	October 12, 1979	December 8, 1979	188138	21.2/35
Lucy's mother Valene visits and tries to re-establish some understanding with her daughter. Pamela, already depressed with the reality of the Barnes family genetic disorder, suddenly has to cope with the news that she is pregnant. Valene implores Bobby to urge Lucy to meet with her. Pamela tries to decide whether to tell her husband the news, as well as her horrible secret, or decide on the fate of her unborn baby alone.
34	5	"The Kristin Affair"	Irving J. Moore	Worley Thorne	October 19, 1979	December 15, 1979	188142	23.8/43
Kristin gets a summer job at Ewing Oil as she openly vies for J.R.'s attention. Bobby learns about Pam's pregnancy before she can make a decision about getting an abortion. J.R. has his hands full as he tries to consummate the biggest oil deal of his life, as well as beginning his own kind of relationship with his sister-in-law.
35	6	"The Dove Hunt"	Leonard Katzman	D. C. Fontana & Richard Fontana	October 26, 1979	December 22, 1979	188143	26.3/47
On a hunting trip in Louisiana with J.R., Bobby and Ray, Jock finds himself the target of revenge from a man he doesn't even remember. Ellie is afraid that she might be facing surgery after finding a lump on her breast. Jock and J.R. are wounded by a sniper while hunting. With their vehicle sabotaged, Bobby and Ray have to walk to town for help and, thinking he might not recover, Jock reveals a secret to J.R. that he has been hiding from Ellie since they were married.
36	7	"The Lost Child"	Irving J. Moore	Rena Down	November 2, 1979	December 29, 1979	188140	25.9/44
Bobby finds himself getting attached to Luke Middens, the young son of one of the hired hands, which only makes Pam's efforts to tell Bobby the truth about their unborn child even more difficult. Eventually, however, she is forced to confess. J.R. becomes suspicious of Sue Ellen's frequent trips to town, and when she refuses to acknowledge her activities, he hires a private detective to follow her. Pam suffers a miscarriage in a riding accident.
37	8	"Rodeo"	Leonard Katzman	Camille Marchetta	November 9, 1979	January 5, 1980	188145	22.3/39
At the annual Ewing-sponsored rodeo, Sue Ellen finds herself drawn to Dusty Farlow, a cowboy participant. Digger holds good his threat to see "his" grandson. J.R. feels threatened by Sue Ellen's sudden enthusiasm for life as she openly displays interest in Dusty. Lucy forces Ray to deal with a painful situation he tried to forget.
38	9	"Mastectomy"	Irving J. Moore	Arthur Bernard Lewis	November 16, 1979	January 12, 1980	188146	28.9/50
39	10	"Mastectomy"	Irving J. Moore	Arthur Bernard Lewis	November 16, 1979	January 12, 1980	188147	28.9/50
Ellie is afraid to tell Jock about the lump in her breast after he reveals he was married before and divorced his first wife when she became mentally ill. Her fear is Jock will leave her also if a mastectomy becomes necessary. Alan Beam continues J.R.'s plan to get Cliff out of the way. Sue Ellen keeps visiting a coffee shop with the hopes of meeting Dusty Farlow again. Ellie undergoes a lifesaving mastectomy. After undergoing the mastectomy, Ellie begins to face what life is going to be like for her. She and Jock seem to be drifting apart as her anger grows over the secret he kept from her for forty years. Digger proves himself a friend to Ellie and they have a long talk. Ellie realizes that she cannot go back in time but she must make peace with the present and the future. Lucy is cold to Ellie as she hides her fears that she will inherit breast cancer. Jock backs J.R. over Bobby in the plan to push Cliff aside. Sue Ellen meets Dusty at a hotel.
40	11	"The Heiress"	Leslie H. Martinson	Loraine Despres	November 23, 1979	January 19, 1980	188141	23.2/40
Lucy decides that Alan Beam is the man for her after she witnesses him standing up to J.R. although she doesn't know the fight was staged by Alan and J.R. to further convince Cliff of Beam's loyalty. Lucy makes an obvious play for Alan, who sees her as his ticket to riches. Pam accuses Bobby of trying to ruin her brother when she accidentally learns about J.R.'s secret Asian oil deal from Cliff.
41	12	"Ellie Saves the Day"	Gunnar Hellström	Arthur Bernard Lewis & David Michael Jacobs	November 30, 1979	January 26, 1980	188144	24.2/39
J.R. is caught from all sides when a typhoon delays the oil drilling in Asia as his bank loan becomes due. Bobby discovers that J.R. has mortgaged Southfork and he is forced to tell Jock and Ellie that they may lose everything. J.R. believes that once Cliff resigns his post as head of the Office of Land Management, the banks will extend their loan deadline. But he's crushed when the efforts of all the Ewing men seem to have failed. Ellie makes a supreme sacrifice in an effort to save Southfork.
42	13	"Mother of the Year"	Larry Hagman	Rena Down	December 14, 1979	February 2, 1980	188149	25.7/44
Sue Ellen's avoidance of John Ross becomes a source of conflict between her and J.R. and between Bobby and Pam as she starts to act like the baby belongs to her then Sue Ellen start bonding with Baby John. Seeing the pain Ellie is going through as workmen prepare to pump oil out of Southfork, Jock decides to sell the Asian oil leases even though it means losing millions. J.R., of course, tries to stop him.
43	14	"Return Engagements"	Gunnar Hellström	David Jacobs	December 20, 1979	February 9, 1980	188148	26.6/45
Ellie's sadness on the occasion of her missing son Gary's birthday quickly changes to jubilation when she learns he and Valene are both back in Dallas and plan to be remarried. Ellie plans to keep the news of the wedding a secret from J.R., who's on a business trip with Kristin, but Sue Ellen delights in giving him the news. She also tells Rudy Millington, Kristin's boyfriend, where to find her. This episode sets up Knots Landing.
44	15	"Love and Marriage"	Alexander Singer	Leonard Katzman	December 21, 1979	February 16, 1980	188150	26.5/45
J.R. decides that bringing Bobby back into Ewing Oil is the best way to keep Jock out of the office. J.R. also aims to get Pam a promotion to keep Bobby's mind off his troubled marriage. Pam is using work to hide from her own unhappiness. Ray seems to have found happiness at last when Donna Culver re-enters his life.
45	16	"Power Play"	Leslie H. Martinson	Jeff Young	January 4, 1980	February 23, 1980	188151	27.0/45
Alan Beam's "romance" with Lucy is discovered by Kristin who believes once J.R. knows about it he will quickly get rid of the ambitious young lawyer. J.R. fools everyone by encouraging Alan to follow through with his plans to marry Lucy. Lucy puts off deciding about Alan's proposal until J.R. orders her not to see him again, then she makes a startling announcement.
46	17	"Paternity Suit"	Harry Harris	Loraine Despres	January 11, 1980	March 1, 1980	188152	28.7/46
After Cliff announces he is quitting the race for Congress, Digger returns to the bottle and drunkenly tells a reporter that Cliff is really the father of Sue Ellen's baby. Jock insists the family sue Cliff, who counter sues for custody of his son. Sue Ellen, J.R. John Ross III and Cliff then take blood tests to prove once and for all who the baby's real father is. It proves to be J.R., who then embraces his son for the first time.
47	18	"Jenna's Return"	Irving J. Moore	Camille Marchetta	January 18, 1980	March 8, 1980	188153	27.2/45
Sue Ellen actively sees Dusty. Pam leaves town. An angry Bobby runs into Jenna Wade. Ray ponders if he and Donna have anything in common besides their love. J.R. gets angry and jealous of Sue Ellen's unexplained nights out. Kristin tries to take advantage of the situation to permanently enter J.R.'s life.
48	19	"Sue Ellen's Choice"	Leonard Katzman	Camille Marchetta	February 1, 1980	March 15, 1980	188154	28.6/44
Sue Ellen is being pressured by Dusty to leave J.R. Pam and Bobby's marriage continues to strain towards breaking point. Donna makes a last attempt to get Ray to change his mind about marriage. Sue Ellen makes her decision and asks J.R. for a divorce, but his reaction is not at all what she expects. Pam is surprised when Jenna visits and declares her intentions towards Bobby.
49	20	"Second Thoughts"	Irving J. Moore	Linda B. Elstad	February 8, 1980	March 22, 1980	188158	31.1/49
J.R. keeps pressuring Alan Beam to marry Lucy very soon. Cliff resigns from the OLM to run in the elections for Congress. But J.R.'s scheme to ruin him is a success and Cliff runs out of campaign money. For the moment, he is finished professionally and has nowhere to go. Bobby feels sorry for Cliff and decides to do some job hunting for him. This provokes a furious reaction from J.R.. Jock foils J.R.'s plans for Lucy and Alan by offering Alan a legal partnership in Dallas. Now J.R. tries to stop the marriage because there's no longer anything in it for him.
50	21	"Divorce, Ewing Style"	Leonard Katzman	Leonard Katzman	February 15, 1980	March 29, 1980	188155	25.4/40
Sue Ellen takes great pains to appear the perfect wife and mother in preparation for her divorce action. When J.R. realizes what she is planning, he decides to stage a strong counterattack. J.R. is furious when he learns Sue Ellen has a private detective following him on his nocturnal visits. He decides the best way to keep her from leaving with their son is to convince everyone that Sue Ellen is drinking again.
51	22	"Jock's Trial: Part I"	Irving J. Moore	Arthur Bernard Lewis	February 22, 1980	April 5, 1980	188156	23.0/36
As the new assistant district attorney, Cliff jumps at the chance to work on the investigation of a body found on Southfork. Sue Ellen fights to convince the family that she is not drinking again. Cliff's investigation unearths some new clues which tie the murder closer and closer to Jock. Sue Ellen prepares to leave J.R, and her baby she goes to Dusty's apartment and hears on the news of a plane crash and Dusty's death. Jock is arrested for murder.
52	23	"Jock's Trial: Part II"	Irving J. Moore	Arthur Bernard Lewis	February 29, 1980	April 5, 1980	188157	27.1/45
While Jock faces his murder trial, other family members are distracted with their own problems: Sue Ellen drinks to forget Dusty's death. Pam watches Digger slowly deteriorate in a hospital. J.R. fears his testimony will incriminate his father. The family hires famed criminal attorney, Scotty Demerest, only to be told that Cliff's case against Jock is dangerously incriminating. But as Digger slowly dies on his deathbed, he confesses that he was the real killer of the body found on Southfork and tells Pam that the man he killed was her biological father Hutch McKinney after he discovered Cliff and Pam's mother was having an affair.
53	24	"The Wheeler Dealer"	Alexander Singer	Barbara Searles	March 14, 1980	April 12, 1980	188159	25.7/45
With most of the family visiting Jock's first wife in a Colorado sanitarium, J.R. uses the time to try to set up an even bigger oil deal with the now profitable Asian wells. Sue Ellen and Pam deal with their separate grief in very different ways. Pam becomes determined to learn about her long-believed dead mother. Sue Ellen again seeks alcohol for her solace, which pleases J.R. since he plans to rid himself of his wife.
54	25	"A House Divided"	Irving J. Moore	Rena Down	March 21, 1980	May 26, 1980	188160	32.7/52
J.R.'s selling of the Asian oil leases before news of the fields' nationalization is made public, wipes out the fortunes of Ewing Oil's former business associates and also creates untold havoc within the family. J.R.'s business dealings also disgust Bobby so much that he and Pamela move out of Southfork. Sue Ellen decides to stop drinking and to wage her own battle against J.R.'s efforts to send her back to the sanitarium. Cliff also plans his own revenge against J.R.. Suspects are aplenty when J.R. while working late at the office, is shot. But who pulled the trigger...?

=== Season 4 (1980–81) ===
No. overall	No. in season	Title	Directed by	Written by	Original U.S. air date	Original U.K. air date	Prod. code	Rating/share (households)
55	1	"No More Mister Nice Guy: Part 1"	Leonard Katzman	Arthur Bernard Lewis	November 7, 1980	November 9, 1980	189002	38.2/61
A cleaning woman discovers J.R. sprawled across the floor of his office. He is rushed to the hospital, close to death. The Ewing family reassembles to wait for news of his fate and police search for clues and suspects in the shooting. The family hopes for J.R. to regain consciousness and be able to shed some light on the identity of his assailant.
56	2	"No More Mister Nice Guy: Part 2"	Leonard Katzman	Arthur Bernard Lewis	November 9, 1980	November 15, 1980	189003	40.0/59
As J.R. undergoes his second operation, Bobby takes over Ewing Oil with Jock's blessing. Sue Ellen tries to combat the guilt that makes her believe she may have shot her husband in a drunken stupor. Alan Beam is brought back to Dallas by the police. Cliff is taken into custody when a fired gun is found in his apartment. Marilee Stone institutes a multi-million-dollar lawsuit against the Ewings. Lucy meets a poor medical student who resists her advances.
57	3	"Nightmare"	Irving J. Moore	Linda B. Elstad	November 14, 1980	November 21, 1980	189004	35.7/56
J.R. fights to overcome the helplessness of his paralysis. Jock finds the gun used to shoot J.R., and the evidence points to someone in the immediate family. Sue Ellen tries to deal with her continuing nightmares that indicate she is the one who shot her husband. J.R.'s power is felt throughout Dallas as Cliff is suspended from his job and Bobby is frustrated in his efforts to run Ewing Oil. Sue Ellen is arrested for J.R.'s shooting when her fingerprints are discovered on the gun Jock found.
58	4	"Who Done It"	Leonard Katzman	Loraine Despres	November 21, 1980	November 22, 1980	189005	53.3/76
Sue Ellen is devastated when the Ewings abandon her, leaving her to languish in jail. After bail is mysteriously posted from an unknown source, Sue Ellen seeks solace from Kristin. She then attempts to find answers through hypnosis sessions with her psychiatrist, Dr. Ellby. These sessions lead to the answer of who shot J.R.?
59	5	"Taste of Success"	Leonard Katzman	Robert J. Shaw	November 28, 1980	November 29, 1980	189006	34.0/56
When Kristin announces that she is carrying J.R.'s baby from their affair, he makes sure all charges are dropped against her and she goes away to California to have her baby in private while receiving regular checks from J.R. via his lawyers. Bobby, Ewing Oil's new president, finds the power intoxicating, which promotes apprehension in both Pamela and J.R. Bobby works hard to buy an oil refinery – something Jock has always wanted and which J.R. could never accomplish. When J.R. learns of his brother's intention, he tries to sabotage Bobby's plan, which leads to another inevitable clash between the brothers.
60	6	"The Venezuelan Connection"	Leonard Katzman	Leah Markus	December 5, 1980	December 6, 1980	189007	37.3/62
The conflict between J.R. and Bobby escalates when Bobby refuses to step down as president of Ewing Oil. Jock finds himself caught in the middle of the conflict between his two sons but after Miss Ellie demands that Bobby stay in Dallas Jock supports Bobby. Bobby seems to be doing a better job for Ewing Oil, even making a deal for Venezuelan oil to the new refinery, but quickly discovers he's being undercut in Dallas' business community by a vengeful J.R. Pam continues to search for her mother. Lucy introduces Mitch to her friends with disastrous results.
61	7	"The Fourth Son"	Irving J. Moore	Howard Lakin	December 12, 1980	December 20, 1980	189008	35.8/60
The sinking of an oil tanker and the loss of 600,000 gallons of crude oil has J.R. delighted, but to Bobby, it is only an inconvenience. Then he discovers that the oil was not insured and the loss could total over $18,000,000 for Ewing Oil. Ray greets a very unwelcome guest, his father, whom he hasn't seen or heard from since he was a kid. Amos Krebbs has some very disturbing news for the entire Ewing family: Ray's biological father is Jock Ewing!
62	8	"Trouble at Ewing 23"	Leonard Katzman	Louis Elias	December 19, 1980	December 25, 1980	189009	33.8/56
An extortionist, threatening to blow up Ewing 23, gives J.R. an opportunity to put a halt on his fading fortunes with the company and the family by outmaneuvering Bobby. Ray has to come to grips with his new-found identity as Jock's son and face the fact that he may be losing Donna to Cliff Barnes.
63	9	"The Prodigal Mother"	Irving J. Moore	David Paulsen	January 2, 1981	January 10, 1981	189010	36.1/59
Pamela believes that she has at last found her mother. Lucy asks Mitch to marry her. J.R. closes in on what he thinks is his brother's reckless running of Ewing Oil. The woman Pam thinks is her mother dashes all hopes for a reconciliation and Pam abandons her quest. Lucy and Mitch defy all of the built-in pitfalls of their romance. J.R. stumbles onto a scheme which he intends to use to put Bobby in trouble with their father.
64	10	"Executive Wife"	Leonard Katzman	Rena Down	January 9, 1981	January 17, 1981	189011	33.9/56
J.R. encourages Jock to consummate a business deal, fully aware that the venture will conflict with Bobby's investment plans and leave Ewing Oil with a serious cash flow problem. Pam, feeling that she places a poor second to her husband's work, receives the attention she is lacking from Bobby when she meets Alex Ward. Lucy makes an announcement which is unsettling to the Ewing clan.
65	11	"End of the Road: Part I"	Irving J. Moore	Leonard Katzman	January 16, 1981	January 24, 1981	189012	33.4/55
J.R. is quick to capitalize on Bobby's rash emotional action to Jock's business deal. Mitch's sister and mother arrive for the upcoming wedding of Mitch and Lucy. J.R. takes an immediate interest in his sister, Afton, which worries Sue Ellen. Bobby finds himself in a tough position after he enters into an oil drilling agreement which will put the company back on good terms with the cartel, even though he knows that Jock has already invested its capital in the land development. J.R. delights in the bind in which his brother has placed the company and investigates a scheme of his own to make Bobby look bad in their father's eyes.
66	12	"End of the Road: Part II"	Irving J. Moore	Leonard Katzman	January 23, 1981	January 31, 1981	189013	36.4/58
Gary and Valene return for Lucy and Mitch's wedding, at which events have far more impact on the Ewing family than is apparent to the assembled guests. Sue Ellen discovers J.R. getting much too friendly with Afton and consequently makes her own play for an old boyfriend Clint Ogden. J.R. is not as delighted as he expected to be when Bobby resigns as president of Ewing Oil. Miss Ellie shocks Jock by accusing him of behavior for which she can never forgive him.
67	13	"Making of a President"	Gunnar Hellström	Arthur Bernard Lewis	January 30, 1981	February 7, 1981	189014	34.8/55
J.R. may have met his match in Leslie Stewart, a high-pressure public relations woman whom he hires to improve his tarnished image as he resumes the reins of Ewing Oil. The prospect of a national image as the all-American businessman is attractive to J.R., but even more so is Leslie, who proposes working to replace his horns with a halo. J.R. is confused by Bobby's actions after giving up the presidency of the company, as is Pam, who Sue Ellen discovers is having rendezvous with Alex. At Southfork, coolness prevails as Miss Ellie is unforgiving of Jock for his part in the recent events in the Ewing family.
68	14	"Start the Revolution With Me"	Larry Hagman	Rena Down	February 6, 1981	February 14, 1981	189015	31.6/50
J.R. takes steps to re-establish his power and increase his wealth, even if it means reshaping history and violating the laws of the land. His campaign for power puts him further under the influence of Leslie who, much to his frustration, keeps him at arms length. He also goes ahead with his plans to topple the government who confiscated his foreign oil fields even though it could lead to prison time if he is caught. Bobby's ambition to purchase a solar energy company again alienates him from Pam. Sue Ellen combats Leslie by resuming an old friendship with Clint Ogden. Cliff is disappointed by Donna. Miss Ellie is still resentful of Ray's influence with Jock.
69	15	"The Quest"	Gunnar Hellström	Robert J. Shaw	February 13, 1981	February 21, 1981	189016	30.6/52
J.R.'s conniving affects the lives of Bobby, Pam, Cliff, Donna, and Ray. J.R.'s influence seems to have no bounds as he works to make sure that Cliff does not get chosen to run for public office. When his plans backfire and draw in Bobby and Pam, he is even more pleased at what fortune has brought him, which even includes an implied promise from Leslie. Sue Ellen can't get anyone to believe that she is being followed and J.R. could not care less. So she takes matters into her own hands, which results in a shocking revelation.
70	16	"Lover, Come Back"	Irving J. Moore	Leonard Katzman	February 20, 1981	February 28, 1981	189017	34.8/58
Sue Ellen is shocked to find that Dusty Farlow is still alive but unwilling to resume their old relationship. Luck seems to follow J.R. as his foreign coup brings the cartel back to Ewing Oil. Jock has his own surprise for the family. Donna and Ray are reunited and plan to marry. Mitch discovers that Lucy has been lying to him.
71	17	"The New Mrs. Ewing"	Patrick Duffy	Linda B. Elstad	February 27, 1981	March 7, 1981	189018	30.2/52
Donna becomes the new Mrs. Ewing when she and Ray marry. The newlywed's happiness is not reflected in the rest of the Ewing family as the cold war between Jock and Miss Ellie escalates. Bobby forms a new alliance with Cliff, but his growing jealousy over Pam compels him to a confrontation with Alex Ward. Lucy is happy to win the title of "Miss Young Dallas" which again makes Mitch feel inferior. Leslie succeeds in driving a wedge between J.R. and the cartel to further her own ambitions.
72	18	"Mark of Cain"	Larry Hagman	Leah Markus	March 13, 1981	March 21, 1981	189019	32.3/55
J.R. succumbs to the cunning of Leslie, who now knows she has the head of Ewing Oil right where she wants him. Bobby is caught in the middle of Jock and Miss Ellie's feud. He is put in the same uncomfortable position while taking his new place on the Senate committee which will decide the future of Takapa. Pam enters a new phase in the relationship with her and Cliff's mother. Sue Ellen continues to seek comfort from Clint. Lucy, the new "Miss Young Dallas", makes life very difficult for Mitch.
73	19	"The Gathering Storm"	Michael Preece	Robert J. Shaw	March 27, 1981	March 28, 1981	189020	32.1/54
Discord haunts the head of the Ewing clan as Jock threatens to sell Ewing Oil if Miss Ellie divorces him and Jock orders J.R. to prepare the deal. Jock and Ellie become even more estranged when they learn Bobby is on the Senate committee investigating the Takapa development project. Lucy's "Miss Young Dallas" career is actively driving a wedge into her marriage to Mitch. Cliff gets wind of J.R.'s involvement in the Asian oil scam. Pam warns her mother about Cliff's motives. Clint urges Sue Ellen to divorce J.R..
74	20	"Ewing vs. Ewing"	Irving J. Moore	Leah Markus	April 3, 1981	April 11, 1981	189021	30.0/53
Donna and Ray try to reconcile Jock and Miss Ellie, and find there is more to their discontent than the Takapa project. Ellie has consulted an attorney regarding divorce. J.R. accelerates his efforts to sell-out Ewing Oil. Leslie's past dealings are revealed when her ex-husband shows up in Dallas. Cliff learns about his mother from Pam. Bobby stuns everyone at the Senate hearings on Takapa. Meanwhile, the differences between Mitch and Lucy grow wider.
75	21	"New Beginnings"	Irving J. Moore	Arthur Bernard Lewis	April 10, 1981	April 18, 1981	189022	30.0/54
Jock and Miss Ellie's reconciliation results in a second honeymoon for them, but it stalls J.R.'s scheme to sell Ewing Oil. WestStar Oil's Jeremy Wendell plots revenge on J.R. for reneging on their deal. Donna threatens J.R. after he sets up Ray for a falling-out with the family. Sue Ellen meets Clint's wife. Leslie earns applause from her ex-husband for manipulating J.R.. Cliff vacillates about meeting his and Pam's mother. A peaceful moment for Sue Ellen and J.R. is broken by the news that Kristin has given birth to a baby boy. (This episode marks the final appearance of Jock Ewing by actor Jim Davis, who would pass away on April 26, 1981.)
76	22	"Full Circle"	Michael Preece	Arthur Bernard Lewis	April 17, 1981	April 25, 1981	189023	31.3/56
Kristin returns and reveals another scheme. Sue Ellen meets Dusty again. Lucy moves out on Mitch. Cliff uses WestStar's help in building evidence against J.R. and hands it over to Bobby's Senate committee. J.R. consults a lawyer about gaining custody of John Ross. Rebecca and Cliff meet at last.
77	23	"Ewing-Gate"	Leonard Katzman	Leonard Katzman	May 1, 1981	May 2, 1981	189024	32.9/56
J.R. gets a security force to keep the press away from Southfork in light of the recent news of the impending investigation. Kristin comes to Ewing Oil and asks J.R. for more money, threatening to cause further scandal to the Ewings if he doesn't pay up. Sue Ellen attempts to collect John Ross from Southfork, but J.R. catches her and steals him back, threatening to kill Sue Ellen if she tries to steal him away again. Pam witnesses this and J.R. threatens to destroy her to if she doesn't stay out of his way. The Senate committee find J.R. and Ewing Oil innocent after J.R. finds the evidence the Senate committee have against him. He immediately returns to the office and sacks Louella for not warning key witness to leave the country and avoid being subpoenaed. Kristin turns up in Dallas calls someone in California and says that a certain someone is going to pay for spurning her. Sue Ellen asks Pam to kidnap John Ross and bring him to her. J.R. discovers this and orders his security guards to find Pam. Cliff arrives at Southfork that night and sees a female body floating in the pool. He jumps in, discovers she's dead and sees J.R. looking down from the broken balcony.

=== Season 5 (1981–82) ===
No. overall	No. in season	Title	Directed by	Written by	Original U.S. air date	Original U.K. air date	Prod. code	Rating/share (households)
78	1	"Missing Heir"	Irving J. Moore	Arthur Bernard Lewis	October 9, 1981	October 18, 1981	189301	31.9/52
The identity of the dead woman floating in the pool is revealed to be Kristin. The police question Cliff and J.R. who accuse each other of murdering Kristin: Cliff says he figures J.R. pushed her over the balcony into the pool; J.R. says he walked out on to the balcony and saw Cliff trying to drown her. J.R. reveals to Bobby that Pam took John Ross to Abilene and gave him to Sue Ellen. Sue Ellen is now living with Dusty and his father Clayton on the Southern Cross Ranch with John Ross. Sheriff Washburn tells J.R. that the Dallas ADA has told him about the deal that was cut when Kristin admitted to shooting him and he figures that J.R. had the best motive for wanting Kristin dead.
79	2	"Gone, But Not Forgotten"	Leonard Katzman	Arthur Bernard Lewis	October 16, 1981	October 25, 1981	189302	28.4/46
J.R. and Cliff testify at the inquest of Kristin's death. A grieving Sue Ellen takes action to put an end to her marriage. Pam becomes increasingly depressed at the fact she is childless and begins to regret taking John Ross to Sue Ellen. J.R.'s henchmen attempt to grab John Ross away from Sue Ellen at the airport. Luckily, Dusty foresaw this and his ranch hands apprehend J.R.'s men.
80	3	"Showdown at San Angelo"	Irving J. Moore	Leonard Katzman	October 23, 1981	November 1, 1981	189303	26.1/42
Sue Ellen has misgivings about building a new life with Dusty. J.R. uses Miss Ellie to gain access to the Southern Cross Ranch and his son. Ellie and Clayton meet for the first time and agree that while they're on opposite sides of the John Ross debate, the fight is not theirs. Sue Ellen denies J.R.'s offer of a quick, painless divorce in exchange for John Ross. J.R. attempts to lure John Ross away from the Southern Cross Ranch and on to the Southfork helicopter with the help of Miss Ellie, but she refuses to be part of it and gives the boy back to Sue Ellen.
81	4	"Little Boy Lost"	Leonard Katzman	Leonard Katzman	October 30, 1981	November 8, 1981	189304	24.9/41
As they prepare to do battle for temporary custody of John Ross, J.R. plans a scheme to undermine Sue Ellen's chances. Ellie warns J.R. against any mud-slinging against Sue Ellen and personally attends the hearing to ensure it doesn't happen. J.R.'s lawyer tells the judge that Sue Ellen's been providing an unfit environment for John Ross by living in sin with Dusty at the Southern Cross. Sue Ellen’s lawyer then tells the court that Dusty is impotent, which shows Sue Ellen is showing her son the purest of emotions. Faced with this, the judge has no choice but to award custody to Sue Ellen. Pam disappears from her work.
82	5	"The Sweet Smell of Revenge"	Irving J. Moore	Linda B. Elstad	November 6, 1981	November 15, 1981	189305	27.4/45
J.R. tells Jock that he has a new plan: he'll get the Farlows to throw Sue Ellen off the Southern Cross by blocking all of the oil shipments to their refineries. J.R. manages to get three of Clayton's suppliers to agree to his plan. Bobby gets the police to search for Pam. They find her on top of a tall building preparing to jump. Bobby quickly arrives at the scene and heads up to get her. He manages to grab her just in time and she is taken to hospital. Bobby receives a letter with a picture of Kristin and her baby. He is contacted by the sender who says he has more information for sale, if Bobby wants it.
83	6	"The Big Shut Down"	Leonard Katzman	Arthur Bernard Lewis	November 13, 1981	November 22, 1981	189306	29.1/50
Clayton refuses to give in to J.R.'s demands. Bobby makes arrangements to buy more information regarding the identify of the father of Kristin's baby. Pam tells Bobby that she's afraid he'll leave her for someone who can give him a family, but Bobby assures her that it will never happen. Farraday tells Bobby that he was Kristin's lover and companion in California, and that he knows where the baby is. In exchange for Bobby's cash, Farraday gives him a birth certificate and copies of the checks Kristin received in California. Bobby examines the information and finds that the checks came from Jordan Lee. Pam meets her half sister Katherine for the first time. Dusty tells Clayton he just found out that the refineries have stopped receiving oil and Clayton starts to investigate why.
84	7	"Blocked"	Irving J. Moore	Arthur Bernard Lewis	November 20, 1981	November 29, 1981	189307	29.4/51
Bobby talks to Jordan, who hesitantly admits having an affair with Kristin. However, Jordan shows Bobby the results of a blood test confirming that he couldn't be the father of Kristin's baby. Jock calls from South America and J.R. assures him that the plan is going perfectly and that John Ross will be back at Southfork when he arrives home. J.R. tells Clayton he'll sell Clayton back all of his oil as soon as he throws Sue Ellen and John Ross off the Southern Cross. Clayton refuses the offer because Sue Ellen means so much to Dusty. He then tells J.R. that the price of crude dropped heavily that morning by one dollar a barrel so far and was likely to drop further. There might not be a Ewing Oil when Jock returns.
85	8	"The Split"	Leonard Katzman	Leonard Katzman	November 27, 1981	December 6, 1981	189308	28.8/50
Ellie receives a shocking legal document from Jock which affects the future of Ewing Oil. J.R. has a confrontation with Dusty at the Cotton Bowl stadium. Lucy returns from Houston. With the family gathered, Ellie reads Jock's message which refers to a legal document dividing the voting shares of the company: Ellie gets 30, J.R. gets 20, Bobby gets 20, Gary gets 10, Ray gets 10 and John Ross gets 10. Ellie controls John Ross's shares while he is away from Southfork, J.R. gets them if he is on the ranch. Against Valene's wishes, Gary arranges to return to Southfork.
86	9	"Five Dollars a Barrel"	Irving J. Moore	Leonard Katzman	December 4, 1981	December 13, 1981	189309	27.0/44
J.R. is forced to Cliff's demands for Ewing property after Cliff buys the bank notes on J.R.'s $200 million loan and threatens foreclosure. J.R. plots unsuccessfully to acquire the voting shares belonging to Ray and Gary. Pam is allowed to leave the hospital for a brief visit to Southfork.
87	10	"Starting Over"	Leonard Katzman	Leonard Katzman	December 11, 1981	December 20, 1981	189310	28.5/45
Miss Ellie wants to help Ray out of his financial problem and uncovers J.R.'s scheme in the process. J.R. consults a broker in New York about selling Ewing stock. Sue Ellen says goodbye to Dusty. Bobby buys Kristin's baby thinking J.R. is the father. Ellie tells Donna what happened at the bank. As they pull out of the driveway in Donna's car, J.R. arrives at the ranch. Ellie gets out of the car to confront him, ruining Bobby's plan. She follows him inside and they start arguing about what he's done. Bobby arrives home with Christopher. As he stands in the hallway listening to J.R. and Ellie argue, Pam comes down the stairs, overjoyed to mistakenly find that Bobby finally managed to obtain a child they can adopt.
88	11	"Waterloo at Southfork"	Irving J. Moore	Linda B. Elstad	December 18, 1981	December 25, 1981	189311	27.4/46
J.R.'s position at Ewing Oil hangs in the balance when Miss Ellie takes matters into her own hands. An angry, determined Ellie calls the family together to vote on whether J.R. should be removed as the company's president when it looks like he will be forced to default on his loan. J.R. plots to gain custody of his son now that Sue Ellen has left the protection of the Farlow family. Bobby becomes aware of the difficulties he and Pam have ahead of them in adopting Kristin's child without Pam learning of his parentage. Ray has no choice but to pull out of the townhouse development deal, leaving Donna angered by his refusal to confide in her.
89	12	"Barbecue Two"	Leonard Katzman	Arthur Bernard Lewis	January 1, 1982	January 2, 1982	189312	29.3/44
Miss Ellie plans the annual Ewing barbecue to coincide with Jock's expected return to Southfork. J.R. and Sue Ellen find a renewed interest in each other. Cliff realizes that he may still love Sue Ellen. Lucy is annoyed when Mitch is called away by a patient. Ray gets drunk and embarrasses Donna. Clayton and Rebecca re-new their old friendship. Katherine gets attracted to Bobby. Miss Ellie's festive mood is ruined by a shocking phone call: Jock is dead.
90	13	"The Search"	Irving J. Moore	Arthur Bernard Lewis	January 8, 1982	January 9, 1982	189313	32.1/49
The Ewings are unable to accept the fact that Jock could be dead and reminisce about Jock and J.R., Bobby and Ray fly to South America to see the crash site and determine his fate. In South America, the Ewing sons find an injured man at a plane crash site who tells them the small plane he was flying in collided with a helicopter which crashed into a lake at the other side of a hill. At Southfork the Ewing women talk about Jock. Ray and Bobby dive into the lake and find pieces of a helicopter and evidence that their father was a passenger. It is J.R. who has the most trouble accepting the reality of his father's mortality.
91	14	"Denial"	Victor French	Linda B. Elstad	January 15, 1982	January 16, 1982	189314	31.1/47
Jock's death has a devastating effect on J.R., and Bobby has to cover for himself as well as his brother in running Ewing Oil. J.R. is unable to deal with even the simplest of business demands in his grief. In the meantime, the rest of the family is puzzled at Miss Ellie's calmness in dealing with her husband's death and Bobby realizes that she is refusing to accept its reality. Cliff, ecstatic at his victory over J.R., tries to renew his relationship with Sue Ellen, who is having trouble coping with her new single life. Ray and Donna's marriage begins to fall apart with Donna's continued success as a writer and Ray's increasing depression over being a failure. A drunken J.R. terrifies Sue Ellen by demanding Jock's only grandson be returned to Southfork.
92	15	"Head of the Family"	Patrick Duffy	Howard Lakin	January 22, 1982	January 23, 1982	189315	31.1/48
J.R.'s continued absence from the business and Ray's apathy toward running the ranch has Bobby busy trying to keep Ewing Oil afloat and Southfork running smoothly. Bobby asks Miss Ellie for the authority he needs to run Ewing Oil until J.R. recovers from Jock's death, but Ellie knows Bobby has all the pressures he can handle with Pam and the baby. J.R. recovers his sense of purpose when Bobby shows him that they are in danger of losing all that Jock had built up for his family. Sue Ellen and Clayton are targets of criticism because of their friendship, so Sue Ellen welcomes Cliff's attentions. While visiting Southfork with J.R., John Ross pleases him by taking his place in Jock's chair.
93	16	"The Phoenix"	Harry Harris	David Paulsen	January 29, 1982	January 30, 1982	189316	28.4/44
J.R. shows his old spirit at Ewing Oil and uses Marilee Stone in an effort to regain his standing with the cartel, vowing to make the company even stronger. Sue Ellen isn't at all pleased when J.R. takes their son to the office to show him his future, even though she is having her own troubles keeping a balance between Cliff and Clayton in her life. Ray's continued negligence at Southfork leads to confrontations with Bobby, Miss Ellie and his marriage. Cliff gets a singing job for Afton at a posh night club, but her pursuit of him makes her aware of his interest in Sue Ellen. J.R. discovers that Jock had left Ewing Oil divided among all the Ewing heirs so he shocks the family by agreeing with his mother to postpone the reading of the will. Rebecca becomes aware that Katherine is attracted to Bobby. Roger starts following Lucy.
94	17	"My Father, My Son"	Larry Hagman	Will Lorin	February 5, 1982	February 6, 1982	189317	28.4/42
J.R.'s joy at his latest cartel deal is overshadowed by his distress at Sue Ellen's friendship with Cliff, especially after he discovers the two have spent the night in Sue Ellen's apartment. His concern with Sue Ellen's involvement with Cliff prompts J.R. to set a plan in motion to break his rival, even attempting to turn Afton against him. Lucy discovers that Mitch is seeing a woman patient socially and turns to Roger for solace. Bobby tries to talk Pam into going back to work while he tries to hurry the adoption of Christopher. J.R. tries to convince Donna that she could save her marriage by having Ray give up his shares of Ewing Oil, cutting his ties with the Ewings.
95	18	"Anniversary"	Joseph Manduke	David Paulsen	February 12, 1982	February 13, 1982	189318	27.5/44
J.R. pushes his campaign to win Sue Ellen back, and at the same time is busy with plots against Ray and Cliff. After J.R. surprises Sue Ellen by observing the anniversary of their first meeting, Clayton cautions her against believing that J.R. could be changing for the better. Bobby surprises Pam with the gift of her own business, one that will enable her to work and be with their son at the same time. J.R. manipulates Donna into discovering her husband at a motel with an old girlfriend in order to persuade Ray to leave Southfork and turn his shares of Ewing Oil over to him. Roger's obsession with Lucy becomes more intense and is given impetus when Lucy comes to him after being told that Mitch has spent the night with Evelyn Michaelson.
96	19	"Adoption"	Larry Hagman	Howard Lakin	February 19, 1982	February 20, 1982	189319	29.9/48
J.R. continues to shower Sue Ellen with attention and she accepts his invitation to dinner at Southfork. The family is delighted to see Sue Ellen back at the ranch, although she is becoming aware of how sick her relationship with her former husband really is. J.R. has Ray arrested and is then able to persuade him to sign over his voting shares. Bobby and Pam are delighted at the results of the adoption hearing for Christopher. Ray and Donna discuss divorce. Lucy tries to reason with Roger, but his reaction indicates how obsessed he has become with her. Cliff discovers J.R.'s plot to get him out of Dallas and, in a confrontation, tells J.R. that he intends to marry Sue Ellen.
97	20	"The Maelstrom"	Patrick Duffy	Will Lorin	February 26, 1982	February 27, 1982	189320	30.0/49
The Ewing family celebrate the successful adoption of Christopher, but J.R. becomes suspicious and determined to find out what became of Kristin's child. He realizes that he may be a long way from getting his own son back because of Sue Ellen's anger. Ray surprises Miss Ellie and Donna with a complete turnaround from his recent behavior. Mitch asks Lucy for a divorce and she runs to Roger, flattered at his obsession and oblivious to its strange manifestations. J.R. vows to destroy Cliff. Clayton warns Sue Ellen not to turn to Cliff just to get back at J.R..
98	21	"The Prodigal"	Michael Preece	David Paulsen	March 5, 1982	March 6, 1982	189321	28.4/46
J.R. hits a new scheme to use against Cliff from a chance remark by Katherine, and sets up a plan with Marilee Stone to ruin him. In high spirits because he was able to thwart J.R.'s previous efforts to con him, Cliff is able to talk Rebecca into expanding his role at Wentworth Tool and Die; even though Katherine is very upset at this latest grab for power by her half-brother. Sue Ellen is the focus of attention because Cliff presses his courtship, much to the distress of Afton, J.R. and Clayton. Bobby meets with Farraday who tries to blackmail him. Pam warns Roger to stay away from Lucy or face the wrath of the Ewing clan. Donna discovers some disturbing facts about Jock while researching her book and turns to a reformed Ray for advice. J.R. investigates Christopher's birth, with the hope of getting a club to hold over Bobby.
99	22	"Vengeance"	Irving J. Moore	Howard Lakin	March 12, 1982	March 13, 1982	189322	27.0/44
Marilee springs J.R.'s trap on Cliff whose greed compels him to take $4,000,000 from his mother's company to invest in the scheme dangled in front of him. J.R.'s plan for revenge is largely motivated to thwart Cliff's romance with Sue Ellen. Afton tells J.R. his real rival is Clayton. Lucy leaves Southfork for a few days, hoping to resume her life with Mitch. Instead, she runs into a belligerent Roger. Bobby meets with Farraday and concedes to his blackmail with the promise that he leaves the country. Ray suggests that Donna goes to Miss Ellie with the information she has uncovered about Jock's early career. J.R. believes he has the means of forcing Bobby to turn over his shares of Ewing Oil after he sees Christopher's adoption papers.
100	23	"Blackmail"	Michael Preece	Leonard Katzman	March 19, 1982	March 20, 1982	189323	26.9/44
Bobby's worst fears are realised when Farraday is murdered; but a much worse blackmailer takes his place: J.R.. With copies of Christopher's adoption records in his possession, J.R. realizes that he is probably the real father to Christopher and now he can force Bobby to do his will so that Pam will never find out. J.R. also believes he will soon have a clear field to get Sue Ellen back, with Clayton leaving town and Cliff well on the road to ruin. Lucy fails to return to Southfork and the police are called in to find her. Donna faces Miss Ellie with her findings on Jock's early career and a deep rift is created between the two women. The police want to know about Bobby's acquaintance with Farraday.
101	24	"The Investigation"	Irving J. Moore	Bruce Shelly	March 26, 1982	March 27, 1982	189324	28.0/48
Bobby is in a difficult position when he is questioned by police about the extent of his involvement with Farraday. The family call Valene in California about Lucy. Cliff realizes he is facing ruin and tries to borrow money from Sue Ellen, which J.R. uses to try to win Sue Ellen back. Donna is distressed at Miss Ellie's continued coolness over Jock's death. Pam remembers Lucy's concern about Roger and goes to his apartment with Bobby, where they rescue her. Bobby is contacted by underworld figures.
102	25	"Acceptance"	Michael Preece	Will Lorin	April 2, 1982	April 3, 1982	189325	29.1/48
J.R. is riding high with Cliff crushed, Bobby on the ropes, Clayton out of the way and Sue Ellen accepting his attention. Cliff despairs after his mother asks him to resign from Wentworth Tool and Die because of his misuse of funds. Afton declares her love for Cliff and tries to convince him that, together, they can beat J.R.. At the same time, J.R.'s discovery of Christopher's birth has Bobby intimidated, even as Bobby undergoes the ordeal of the investigation into Farraday's underworld connections. Ray intercedes in Donna and Miss Ellie's feud and is instrumental in getting Ellie to face the reality of Jock's death. Mitch decides to leave Dallas and Lucy. A smug J.R. takes Sue Ellen to Southfork for a visit.
103	26	"Goodbye, Cliff Barnes"	Irving J. Moore	Arthur Bernard Lewis	April 9, 1982	April 10, 1982	189326	27.9/46
Cliff uses his strongest weapon against J.R., after J.R. is the apparent winner of their rivalry. Sue Ellen accepts J.R.'s offer of marriage, leaving a disappointed Clayton holding an unused engagement ring and Cliff more despondent than ever. Bobby and Pam find new evidence about Christopher's birth, making Bobby furious at J.R. for using the child as a pawn in his efforts to control Ewing Oil. Lucy resists pressing rape charges against Roger, but agrees to a pregnancy test. The celebration at Southfork over J.R. and Sue Ellen's reconciliation is spoiled by news of Cliff's suicide attempt. Rebecca threatens to use her wealth to break the entire Ewing clan. Miss Ellie blames J.R. for the escalation of the Barnes-Ewing feud and vows to remove him from the presidency of Ewing Oil. Sue Ellen blames herself for Cliff's suicide attempt. She then tells J.R. that she refuses to marry him if Cliff dies.

=== Season 6 (1982–83) ===
No. overall	No. in season	Title	Directed by	Written by	Original U.S. air date	Original U.K. air date	Rating/share (households)
104	1	"Changing of the Guard"	Michael Preece	Arthur Bernard Lewis	October 1, 1982	October 6, 1982	22.5/38
J.R. is the focus of everyone's wrath at Southfork when he is blamed by the other Ewings, as well as Afton and Rebecca, for driving Cliff to attempt suicide. Bobby has his own reasons for being furious with J.R. after being blackmailed by him over Christopher's parentage. Lucy has her own worries as she waits for the results of her pregnancy test. Miss Ellie wants J.R. out as president of Ewing Oil. J.R. meets Holly Harwood and secretly buys 25% of her company, Harwood Oil.
105	2	"Where There's a Will"	Leonard Katzman	Leonard Katzman	October 8, 1982	October 13, 1982	23.1/40
J.R. schemes to get an advance look at Jock's will after discovering his father wished to have it sealed until it can be revealed to the entire family. Still feeling guilty about Cliff, Sue Ellen visits Clayton at the Southern Cross to think about remarrying J.R.. Pam persuades Lucy to see a doctor about her pregnancy. Afton is upset when Cliff rejects her attempts to look after him. Marilee Stone offers Cliff a position with her company. Ray and Donna get some disturbing news from Kansas about Amos Krebbs. Miss Ellie considers attending the Oil Barons Ball.
106	3	"Billion Dollar Question"	Michael Preece	Arthur Bernard Lewis	October 15, 1982	October 20, 1982	20.6/32
Bobby and J.R. agree that it is time Miss Ellie went out and met old friends. When Ellie decides to attend the Oil Barons Ball, J.R. again tries to persuade her to open the will; he then tries to force Bobby towards the same goal. Donna and Ray's long-delayed honeymoon is postponed when they have to go to Kansas for Amos Krebbs' funeral. Pam's concern for Lucy's depression prompts her to tell Bobby about her condition. J.R. uses John Ross as a pawn to win Sue Ellen back. Cliff cautiously accepts Marilee's job offer.
107	4	"The Big Ball"	Leonard Katzman	Leonard Katzman	October 22, 1982	October 27, 1982	24.8/41
The Oil Barons Ball opens up a new era for Miss Ellie. Sue Ellen is shocked when Dusty shows up at the Southern Cross while she is there visiting Clayton. Lucy decides she must get on with her life and put the past behind her. Ray tries to control his rebellious young cousin Mickey while he and Donna are in Kansas. J.R. and Bobby realise that the Ewing's will be alienated from the oil cartel if Cliff works with Marilee. J.R. arranges a big surprise for Miss Ellie at the ball.
108	5	"Jock's Will"	Michael Preece	David Paulsen	October 29, 1982	November 3, 1982	28.3/47
Miss Ellie painfully decides to declare Jock legally dead and the entire Ewing clan gather at Southfork for the reading of the will. Miss Ellie discusses the procedure for declaring Jock legally dead with the family attorney. Rebecca promises to use all her power and wealth to destroy the Ewings. Pam is torn between her love for Bobby and her loyalty to Rebecca. Ray and Donna bring Mickey back to Southfork. Sue Ellen and J.R. set a date for their re-marriage. The terms of Jock's will could ruin the entire Ewing family. This episode begins a crossover with Knots Landing that concludes on "New Beginnings".
109	6	"Aftermath"	Leonard Katzman	David Paulsen	November 5, 1982	November 10, 1982	24.4/40
Ewing Oil is split down the middle as J.R. and Bobby begin their year-long battle for control of the company. Miss Ellie and Pam worry that the battle may hurt the family. Rebecca warns J.R. that she will never forget what he did to Cliff. Lucy returns to modelling. Christopher's adoption goes to its second stage. Bobby considers a Canadian oil deal. Rebecca buys an oil company for Cliff. J.R. hires corrupt police detective Harry McSween to blackmail the head of the Office of Land Management.
110	7	"Hit and Run"	Michael Preece	Howard Lakin	November 12, 1982	November 17, 1982	24.7/40
J.R. arranges a fake hit and run accident in order to blackmail Walt Driscoll, the head of the Office of Land Management, into gathering him the variance he wants. Cliff is made president of the newly underway Barnes-Wentworth Oil. Afton warns Cliff and Rebecca not to use the company as a weapon against the Ewings. Miss Ellie accepts Frank Crutcher's invitation to lunch. Donna tells Miss Ellie that she should get used to the idea of seeing other men. Lucy discusses her divorce from Mitch with her lawyer. Cliff is approached about the same Canadian oil deal that Bobby is interested in. Pam helps Bobby clinch the Canadian deal which upsets Cliff.
111	8	"The Ewing Touch"	Leonard Katzman	Howard Lakin	November 19, 1982	November 24, 1982	25.1/40
J.R. is granted his oil variance and begins full production on his wells, while Walt Driscoll has to flee Dallas when news of the variance leaks out. The oil cartel cannot understand why J.R. is pumping to capacity when there is a glut of oil in the market. Sue Ellen asks Clayton if he will give her away at her wedding to J.R.. Miss Ellie tries to make peace with Rebecca, but Rebecca wants vengeance against the Ewings. Bobby and J.R. are not pleased when Miss Ellie brings Frank Crutcher to dinner. Ray tells Mickey to straighten out. Cliff lashes out at Pam for helping Bobby win the Canadian deal. Holly confronts J.R. about his pumping at full capacity. Donna discusses dismantling the OLM now that Walt Driscoll has proved how corrupt it is. Christopher is adopted at last.
112	9	"Fringe Benefits"	Michael Preece	Will Lorin	November 26, 1982	December 1, 1982	21.5/34
Sue Ellen and Afton both contend with the lecherous advances of a refinery owner who's pitching an attractive oil deal to both Cliff and J.R.. J.R. puts Miss Ellie on the defensive when he asks what Frank Crutcher means to her. Ellie tells Frank that she thinks that they are moving too fast. Bobby learns that there will be delays in drilling in Canada. Punk meets with Bobby to see if he knows what J.R. is doing with all the oil that his wells are pumping. Sue Ellen and Pam vow to remain friends despite the war between their husbands. Afton compromises herself to help Cliff get the oil refinery. The cartel sides with Cliff in the battle against J.R.. Pam asks Bobby to forget the Ewing Oil war and leave Southfork but Bobby refuses to give up the fight.
113	10	"The Wedding"	Leonard Katzman	Will Lorin	December 3, 1982	December 8, 1982	28.3/45
The wedding of J.R. and Sue Ellen brings Cliff to Southfork and sets into motion more intrigue and excitement. Mickey and Lucy meet but do not get off on the right foot. Ellie invites Clayton to stay at Southfork as her guest. Jordon Lee tells Bobby that he had better stop J.R. or Ewing Oil will be destroyed. Ray tells Mickey to stay away from Lucy. Afton is upset that Cliff still loves Sue Ellen. Lucy asks for an out-of-town modeling assignment so she won't have to attend the wedding. Rebecca notices Clayton's attraction to Miss Ellie. Donna agrees to serve on the Texas Energy Commission. Members of the oil cartel do not attend the wedding.
114	11	"Post Nuptial"	Michael Preece	David Paulsen	December 10, 1982	December 15, 1982	26.2/40
J.R. and Sue Ellen's wedding reception turns into a fist-throwing brawl, as Cliff comes to blows with J.R.. Bobby and the oil cartel suspect that J.R. is selling oil to an embargoed nation. Cliff and Rebecca unite the cartel in a plan to convince all the refinery owners in Texas not to deal with J.R.. On their honeymoon, Sue Ellen makes J.R. give her a promise of "total commitment". Holly confesses to Bobby that J.R. owns 25% of Harwood Oil. Pam advises Lucy to seek professional help. Bobby confronts J.R. with his involvement in Harwood Oil.
115	12	"Barbecue Three"	Leonard Katzman	Arthur Bernard Lewis	December 17, 1982	December 22, 1982	26.2/43
The annual Ewing barbecue is the scene of an angry confrontation between J.R. and a group of Texas oilmen led by Cliff. Bobby continues his investigation into where J.R. is shipping oil. Mickey asks Lucy on a date, but she turns him down. J.R. announces he is opening up a chain of cut-rate gas stations that will yield him enormous profits. Bobby vows to "fight dirty" just like J.R. in order to win control of Ewing Oil. Miss Ellie wonders if Jock made the right decision in dividing the company between J.R. and Bobby. After the confrontation at the barbecue between the oil cartel and the Ewings, Miss Ellie decides that drastic action must be taken.
116	13	"Mama Dearest"	Patrick Duffy	Arthur Bernard Lewis	December 31, 1982	December 31, 1982	18.3/35
Bobby reluctantly sides with J.R. when Miss Ellie threatens court action to contest Jock's will. Cliff and the cartel discuss how to beat J.R.'s cut-rate gasoline prices. Pam decides to support Miss Ellie in the fight to overturn Jock's will. Bobby and J.R. tell Miss Ellie they oppose her plans. J.R. gains media spotlight with his gasoline prices. Donna meets with resistance from the energy commission members when she tries to withdraw J.R.'s oil variance. While he is buying a new condo Cliff ignores Afton's desire for marriage . Bobby confronts Pam about her siding against him with regards to Jock's will. NOTE: This episode, Mama Dearest, is the only episode in Dallas history that aired in the UK before it aired in the US. The episode aired on the same day in both countries, but the US timezones are 5–8 hours behind the UK timezone.
117	14	"The Ewing Blues"	David Paulsen	David Paulsen	January 7, 1983	January 12, 1983	25.7/38
Miss Ellie faces a hard decision when she must decide whether to damage Jock's memory or see her family destroyed because of his will. Pam supports Miss Ellie's determined stand, which creates a breach between her and Bobby. She finds a strong ally in Mark Graison. J.R. and Sue Ellen further alienate themselves when they go on television to defend J.R.'s position in the oil industry and in Ewing Oil. Holly realises that her deal with J.R. has put her company in an untenable position and she goes to Bobby for advice. Bobby has to reluctantly antagonise the cartel in his need to beat J.R.. Lucy is secretly amused by her feud with Mickey. Donna is discouraged when the energy commission gives in to J.R.. Ray gives her much needed support which leads to conflict with J.R..
118	15	"The Reckoning"	Bill Duke	Will Lorin	January 14, 1983	January 19, 1983	26.6/41
The hearing to overturn Jock's will causes great emotional pain for Miss Ellie as well as further setting other undercurrents in the Ewing family into motion. If Jock's latest will is ruled invalid, an earlier one will leave Ewing Oil to Ellie and Ray and Gary without their trusts. Ellie assures Ray that he will get his share of the money, but Ray says he will not accept this form of charity. J.R. attacks Pam for interfering and asks Sue Ellen to try to persuade Pam to support Bobby's position against his mother. Sue Ellen discovers Mark's obvious attraction to Pam, and J.R. sees that as a weapon to use in his fight with Bobby. Rebecca asks Cliff and the cartel to hold any action against J.R. until the court's ruling on Jock's will. Donna continues her fight with the oil commission, aware that the outcome will affect J.R.'s gasoline futures.
119	16	"A Ewing Is a Ewing"	Larry Hagman	Frank Furino	January 28, 1983	February 2, 1983	26.8/41
In the aftermath of the court's ruling on Jock's will, Miss Ellie escapes from the tension at Southfork with a trip to Galveston, where she runs into an irate Clayton. He is still smoldering from J.R.'s use of Sue Ellen to get his excess crude refined at Clayton's refinery. Cliff contrives to get a political carrot dangled in front of J.R. to get him out of Dallas. The cartel agrees to Bobby's demands for his share of the Wellington field. Bobby discovers that energy commission member George Hicks has ties with J.R.. Holly gets to know the real J.R. Ewing and they both use threats to establish a new working relationship with each other. Mark pays a surprise visit to Pam at her studio.
120	17	"Crash of '83"	Bill Duke	Howard Lakin	February 4, 1983	February 9, 1983	24.0/36
Bobby is forced to copy his brother in dirty dealing, which turns his stomach and disgusts Pam. Bobby's underhandedness is to get George Hicks to reverse his stand on J.R.'s variance with the energy commission. J.R. modestly denies he has political aspirations as he desperately searches for a refinery to continue the cheap gasoline production which is making him a popular hero. Rebecca vows to use all of the Wentworth influence to prevent him from acquiring a refinery. Cliff discovers that Afton had an affair with Bill Thurman. J.R. is upset about his mother's friendship with Clayton. Afton receives some shocking news.
121	18	"Requiem"	Larry Hagman	Linda B. Elstad	February 11, 1983	February 16, 1983	18.5/25
Cliff blames himself after the crash of the Wentworth company plane, which his mother took as a passenger in his place. Rebecca's accident is the latest episode caused indirectly by the ongoing war between Cliff and J.R.. Before Rebecca dies, she makes Pam promise to protect Cliff. Katherine flies in to join Pam and Cliff for the funeral and lashes out at Cliff for letting their mother fight his battles with the Ewings. J.R. is stunned when the energy commission rescinds his variance to pump oil and he quickly makes contact with Driscoll to establish a Caribbean oil deal. Holly tries to use the variance ruling to force J.R.'s hand in her company, but he points out that he now controls Harwood Oil. At Southfork, Pam makes a shocking announcement to Bobby.
122	19	"Legacy"	Patrick Duffy	Robert Sherman	February 18, 1983	February 23, 1983	25.8/40
Pam leaves Bobby and Southfork taking Christopher with her, to the delight of J.R. and Katherine. J.R. sees Bobby's split with Pam as an advantage to himself in their business rivalry. Katherine has her own reasons for interfering in her half-sister's life. Rebecca's Will holds surprises when it is read, with Katherine again plotting against Cliff as well as Pam. Lucy rescues Mickey from a bar-room brawl and they start to form a friendship. Donna and Ray are surprised at the cartel's attitude towards Bobby. Clayton advises Ellie to forget the family troubles and get on with her life. He tells Sue EIlen he sees qualities in Ellie he once thought he saw in her. A nervous J.R. offers Bobby a compromise.
123	20	"Brothers and Sisters"	Larry Hagman	Will Lorin	February 25, 1983	March 2, 1983	25.4/40
Bobby and Pam are the target of one another's plotting which puts a greater strain on their relationship. With Katherine pursuing Bobby and Mark pursuing Pam, the separated pair find it difficult to reach each other. Miss Ellie finds that helping Clayton find a new home in Dallas after the sale of the Southern Cross is satisfying, much to the dismay of J.R.. J.R.'s budding popularity makes Donna and Ray realise that the outcome of his and Bobby's race for Ewing Oil could affect Dave Culver's future in the Senate. Holly again goes to Bobby for advice. Lucy and Mickey reach an understanding.
124	21	"Caribbean Connection"	Patrick Duffy	Will Lorin	March 4, 1983	March 9, 1983	25.1/39
Bobby discovers evidence proving that J.R. is illegally shipping oil to an embargoed nation. As Bobby plots to put a knot in J.R.'s Caribbean connection, J.R. again considers running for public office. Sue Ellen is concerned that her past may damage his chances for election. Pam is pushed further into the path of Mark by Cliff and Katherine. Holly again goes to Bobby for advice, but J.R. forces her into doing his bidding in spite of Bobby's counsel. Mickey gets Lucy involved with his misunderstandings with Donna and Ray. Ray rushes to help Bobby pin down J.R.'s involvement in the illegal oil shipments.
125	22	"The Sting"	Larry Elikann	David Paulsen	March 11, 1983	March 16, 1983	27.7/42
Bobby springs his trap on J.R., equalizing the two brothers in the race for Ewing Oil unless J.R. can neutralize the harm done to his Caribbean deal. Katherine offers to supply information to J.R. to help in their common rivalry with Cliff, as well as Bobby. Miss Ellie realises that Bobby and Pam's split might not be temporary. Lucy puts her trust in Mickey, making him understand the reason for her past coldness. The cartel is happy to see Cliff back on his feet, which is due largely to Pam and Mark. Bobby meets Mark in Pam's hotel suite and the confrontation leads to a further rift in his and Pam's marriage. Driscoll vows revenge on J.R., as does Holly, and J.R. faces the fact that they are but two on a long list.
126	23	"Hell Hath No Fury"	Ernest Pintoff	Arthur Bernard Lewis	March 18, 1983	March 23, 1983	25.0/42
J.R. gets ready for his trip to Cuba. After suffering a $17 million loss, Holly tells Bobby that she's determined to get the Ewing brothers out of her life. Lucy enjoys modelling again and continues to see Mickey. Bobby runs into more weather problems on his Canadian deal. J.R. encourages Katherine to move in on Bobby. Holly declares a truce with J.R. and tries to seduce him. Bobby and Pam spend the night together, but when he wants her to go back to Southfork, she tells him that the night was "just a moment" and so they break up again. J.R. tries to force Driscoll to tell him the name of his contract man in the Caribbean. J.R. and Sue Ellen appear on television again where he sets the stage for his Cuban trip. Ray offers Bobby his financial support in the battle with J.R.. Bobby tells Donna and Ray that it's too late to save his marriage. Katherine urges Mark to take Pam to France. Holly tells Sue Ellen of her relationship with J.R. The State Department clears J.R.'s trip to Cuba. Sue Ellen finds proof of J.R.'s marital infidelity.
127	24	"Cuba Libre"	Robert C. Thompson	Leonard Katzman	March 25, 1983	March 30, 1983	25.1/39
J.R. finds the Ewing name doesn't mean much in Cuba when he arrives there to negotiate his and Holly's oil shipments. Before he leaves for the Caribbean, J.R. is promised an ample reward by Holly if he is able to recover their money. While J.R. is away, Sue Ellen confronts Holly to disprove his infidelity. Mickey's mother visits Southfork at Donna's invitation. Mickey is embarrassed to introduce his mother to Lucy. Katherine shows Bobby a possible way to solve his Canadian dilemma. Bobby and Cliff meet accidentally and have a confrontation about the Canadian deal as well as Bobby's troubled marriage. In the meantime, Pam and Mark enjoy the Riviera together. Miss Ellie and Clayton are the subject of much speculation. Ellie has feelings that she does not want to face.
128	25	"Tangled Web"	Nicolas Sgarro	David Paulsen	April 1, 1983	April 6, 1983	25.6/41
J.R.'s Cuban deal sets up a string of events involving Bobby, Pam, Sue Ellen and Holly. Bobby's illusions about the even race he is having with J.R. for Ewing Oil is shattered by a box of Cuban cigars. Bobby finds out that Pam is in France with Mark, where they are discovered by friends from Dallas. Ray confesses to Lil that Jock was his father. Afton defends Cliff and orders Katherine out of their house. Miss Ellie is concerned about Clayton and Sue Ellen's relationship and is not sure she believes Clayton's explanation. Sue Ellen makes a devastating discovery.
129	26	"Things Ain't Goin' Too Good at Southfork"	Gunnar Hellström	Leonard Katzman	April 15, 1983	April 20, 1983	24.0/39
Sue Ellen returns to her drinking ways after she discovers J.R. in Holly's bedroom. Sue Ellen staggers to Clayton's hotel room for help and Miss Ellie can't understand when she finds them together. Pam returns to confront Bobby and faces the decision to either help her husband in his fight for Ewing Oil, and possibly lose him forever, or not help him and perhaps lose him to Katherine. Lucy and Mickey try to help Sue Ellen, with tragic results.
130	27	"Penultimate"	Nick Havinga	Howard Lakin	April 29, 1983	May 4, 1983	22.8/38
Lucy bitterly blames Sue Ellen for the accident which has injured Mickey. The Ewing clan gathers at the emergency hospital where Sue Ellen and Mickey have been taken after the car crash on the Southfork road. Lucy is especially upset because the doctors will not let her into the room where they are treating Mickey and she lashes out at Sue Ellen for her drunken driving. Ray blames himself for bringing Mickey to Texas from his Kansas home. Clayton confronts J.R. for the actions which drove Sue Ellen back to seeking refuge in alcohol. Bobby blames Holly for the intrigue she set up which has shattered Sue Ellen's faith in J.R..
131	28	"Ewing Inferno"	Leonard Katzman	Arthur Bernard Lewis	May 6, 1983	May 11, 1983	24.4/39
Ray pressures Sheriff Washburn to find the hit-and-run driver that crashed into the car that Sue Ellen and Mickey were in. Holly wants to pay J.R. his $20 million in instalments but J.R. objects, rightly detecting Bobby's hand. J.R. gets a slap in the face from Pam during an argument over her trip to France. Mark convinces Pam to vote with Katherine and give the drill to Bobby. Mickey's condition continues to be very serious and Lil even goes as far as to say that perhaps it would have been better if he had died on the spot. J.R. tells Bobby that they should consider stopping the fight for control of Ewing Oil. Pam wants a divorce. Clayton convinces Ellie to take a break from family problems and go away with him. Katherine tries to console Bobby after he gets the news about the divorce. Ray learns that Walt Driscoll was driving the car that hit Mickey and Sue Ellen, prompting him to blame J.R. for Mickey's injuries. Ray and J.R. engage in a terrible fight causing a major fire at Southfork. J.R., Ray, Sue Ellen and John Ross are trapped as the flames engulf the ranch.

=== Season 7 (1983–84) ===
No. overall	No. in season	Title	Directed by	Written by	Original U.S. air date	Original U.K. air date	Prod. code	Rating/share (households)
132	1	"The Road Back"	Nick Havinga	Arthur Bernard Lewis	September 30, 1983	October 25, 1983	172101	27.5/44
Bobby saves J.R., Ray, Sue Ellen and John Ross from the Southfork fire. The problems that Bobby has faced because of the fire brings him and Pam together again. Sue Ellen overhears an argument between Pam and J.R. and discovers that she wasn't solely responsible for the car crash that injured Mickey. Sue Ellen tells Clayton she's off the bottle as she no longer feels guilty and decides to devote her life to raising John Ross. Ray continues to blame J.R. for Mickey's ordeal. J.R. points out that he, Bobby and Ray share the responsibility as Bobby and Ray set up the sting operation that sent Driscoll to jail, thereby helping to create the situation that made Driscoll go after J.R.. Harv Smithfield explains to J.R. and Bobby that the fight for Ewing Oil cannot end until the final audit is done according to Jock's will. At that time, one of the brothers will own 51% of the company.
133	2	"The Long Goodbye"	Leonard Katzman	Leonard Katzman	October 7, 1983	November 1, 1983	172102	23.7/28
Sue Ellen tells J.R. that she wants an open marriage, with separate bedrooms at Southfork. Bobby asks Pam to come back to him, but he is faced with having to choose between protecting Miss Ellie or preserving his marriage as Pam says she could never live at Southfork again. J.R. and Katherine are both furious about the possible reconciliation of Bobby and Pam. J.R. tells Pam that he will do everything in his power to hurt Bobby and destroy Cliff if Pam revives her marriage. Mickey is depressed when the doctor says he'll be paralysed for life.
134	3	"The Letter"	Nick Havinga	David Paulsen	October 14, 1983	November 8, 1983	172103	21.6/35
J.R. plants the seed of Pam's destruction with Katherine, who will go to any lengths to try to win Bobby. When Katherine can't talk Pam out of going back to Bobby, she decides to fake a letter from Pam about Mark which would throw a new light on a reconciliation. The letter has the effect Katherine intends. Pam meets Bobby for a date only to discover that Bobby now wants out of their marriage. John Ross becomes withdrawn due to his parents fighting, the fire at Southfork, and is taken to see a psychologist, which irritates J.R., but eventually agrees with it. At the day camp, John Ross meets his counselor, Peter Richards.
135	4	"My Brother's Keeper"	Leonard Katzman	Arthur Bernard Lewis	October 21, 1983	November 15, 1983	172104	25.3/41
J.R. and Katherine arrange it so that Pam sees Bobby with an attractive woman at a restaurant. Afton tells Pam that Katherine must have set up the whole thing, as there are too many restaurants in Dallas for it to be a coincidence. J.R. pays off a driller for having sabotaged Bobby's Canadian oil wells. J.R. later tells a hooker, Serena, that he has no intention of dividing the company with Bobby when the final audit comes through. Lucy tells Mickey that she loves him despite his paralysis and will stand by him and see he doesn't give up on himself. Pam and Bobby's divorce is made final by a judge in court. Pam is present, but Bobby is not.
136	5	"The Quality of Mercy"	Nick Havinga	Leonard Katzman	October 28, 1983	November 22, 1983	172105	24.0/40
Pam moves into her mother's house and indicates to Mark that he will be the new man in her life. Meanwhile, Bobby feels lonely and accepts an invitation from Katherine for dinner. Cliff blackmails Sly into spying on J.R. by promising to arrange an early parole release for her brother, Steve, who is serving a jail sentence for breaking and entering. Lucy confesses to Sue Ellen that she sometimes has doubts about whether she could spend the rest of her life with Mickey. But when she hears that Mickey no longer wants to see her, she bursts into his hospital room and loudly berates him and tells him that she loves him. Soon after, Mickey goes into a coma and is put on a life support machine. Ray takes Mickey's life into his own hands and unplugs the life support machine.
137	6	"Check and Mate"	Leonard Katzman	David Paulsen	November 4, 1983	November 29, 1983	172106	26.8/41
Ray is arrested for murdering Mickey and is taken to the police station where he is later visited by Donna and Bobby. Ray tells Donna that he doesn't need a lawyer as he did what he's accused of. But eventually he reluctantly agrees to Donna's pleas to get Paul Morgan to represent him. Both Lil and Lucy are in states of shock. Cliff urges Sly to continue spying on J.R. if he wants her to help her brother get his parole. He is ecstatic about scooping J.R. through Sly's information on the Murphy deal. Katherine rebuffs J.R.'s pass, and tells him that she's in love with Bobby. Sue Ellen begins to suspect that Peter, John Ross' counsellor, has a crush on her. Unexpected developments in the course of the final audit meeting bear significantly on the outcome, as the J.R./Bobby contest officially concludes with the announcement of who will control Ewing Oil.
138	7	"Ray's Trial"	Michael Preece	Arthur Bernard Lewis	November 11, 1983	December 6, 1983	172107	26.7/41
J.R. drowns his disappointment at having lost the battle for Ewing Oil. But the cartel agrees to think about his proposal to do business with him again. Meanwhile, Bobby meets an old girlfriend, Jenna Wade, who is working at Billy Bobs, and offers to drive her home. Jenna refuses Bobby's invitation as she does not want to get involved and hurt again. Bobby shows up at Pam's to pick up Christopher, where he apologises to Katherine for breaking their dinner date. Pam is more upset to hear that he was with Jenna. Ray's trial begins and three doctors, Lucy and Bobby testify. Lil is called to the stand but Ray leaps to his feet and objects strongly.
139	8	"The Oil Baron's Ball"	Leonard Katzman	Leonard Katzman	November 18, 1983	December 13, 1983	172108	27.5/43
In the courtroom, Lil admits that she asked Ray to pull out the plug of Mickey's life support system. But the judge still declares Ray guilty and passes sentence on him. Sue Ellen and J.R. make love once more, but afterwards, J.R. complains that he is being used merely as a stud. At the Oil Baron's Ball, neither Bobby nor Pam are pleased to see each other with their respective dates. Lucy goes to the Ball with John Ross's councellor Peter Richards. Later in the ladies room, there is a confrontation between Pam and Jenna with Katherine fueling the attack. Cliff is made Oil Man of the Year and on his way up to collect the award he tells J.R. that he plans to tell the true story about Jock Ewing and Digger Barnes. J.R. starts to rise from his seat.
140	9	"Morning After"	Michael Preece	David Paulsen	November 25, 1983	December 20, 1983	172109	25.3/40
Cliff announces on the podium at the Oil Baron's Ball that Digger deserved the acclaim that Jock has received as it was he that found the oil that the Ewings have been taking from the ground since. When Cliff steps down, an all-out fight starts with fists and food flying and Bobby, Mark, Ray, J.R., Cliff and Peter all participating. Jenna treats Bobby's wounds and they stay the entire night together, but do not have sex. Pam starts work at Barnes-Wentworth Oil but demands that the Barnes/Ewing feud must end. Pam and Cliff buy a new oil service company, but Pam feels that Cliff used her sex appeal to clinch the deal with Mr. Kesey. Sue Ellen and Peter have a private talk about their relationship and Sue Ellen says that nothing could happen between them for many reasons and pleads with Peter to continue seeing John Ross as his counsellor. But the next day, Peter is not at the camp. When Sue Ellen tracks him down, she insists that they must talk some more and, without warning, Peter suddenly kisses her.
141	10	"The Buck Stops Here"	Leonard Katzman	Arthur Bernard Lewis	December 2, 1983	December 27, 1983	172110	26.6/42
Sue Ellen and J.R. have a heated argument about Sue Ellen's relationship with Peter. Pam is annoyed when she discovers that Bobby, Jenna, Christopher and Charlie spent the day together. Mark angerily tells Pam he going to the rodeo and if she does not want to go she can stay at home. J.R. is determined to discover who is double-crossing him on his business deals. Katherine offers to set Jenna up for life in Houston, but Jenna refuses and tells Bobby that Katherine wants him. Bobby, Ray and Mark all participate at the rodeo. Afterwards, Tracy asks Mark to dance and Bobby and Pam dance. They each feel the tension and pain of the strong feelings they still have for each other but say nothing. Jenna feels jealous and reciprocates by giving Bobby a deep kiss in public after her ride on the mechanical bull. Pam then takes Mark and leaves. They go home and spend the night together for the first time.
142	11	"To Catch a Sly"	Michael Preece	David Paulsen	December 9, 1983	January 3, 1984	172111	27.3/42
Pam feels disturbed after her night with Mark because she still feels more attached to Bobby. When Bobby arrives to pick up Christopher, they talk about their relationship. Bobby becomes very depressed when he discovers that Pam has slept with Mark. J.R. asks Detective McSween to have all the phones in his and Cliff's office tapped. But it is J.R. himself that cleverly maneuvers Cliff out of his office and puts the electronic bug on Cliff's phone. J.R. then discovers that the spy is Sly and presents her with photos of Cliff and her together. He tells Sly that the information she will be passing on to Cliff will now be controlled by him. Sue Ellen tells Peter that they can't be friends because she is obviously too attracted to him.
143	12	"Barbecue Four"	Leonard Katzman	Arthur Bernard Lewis	December 16, 1983	January 10, 1984	172112	25.8/41
J.R. sets Cliff up through Sly when he passes on the Travis Boyd deal to Cliff. Sly discovers that Cliff had nothing to do with her brother's parole, so J.R. suggests that Sly ask Cliff for money. Cliff agrees to support her while she takes care of her brother. Jenna refuses Bobby's plea to give up her job, but accepts a dinner invitation at Southfork. At dinner, Miss Ellie and Clayton pay a surprise visit. J.R. is furious as Clayton sits down to eat in his daddy's chair. J.R. begins to form a deal by devious means with a government official called Edgar Randolph. At the annual Ewing barbecue, Pam tells Miss Ellie she still loves Bobby. Mark and Bobby call a tenuous truce. Sue Ellen and Peter kiss passionately behind one of the barns. Meanwhile in Rome, Katherine is disappointed to discover that Charlie's birth certificate names Bobby as the father. As the guests start to leave the barbecue, Clayton announces that he and Miss Ellie are engaged. J.R. is furious over the news.
144	13	"Past Imperfect"	Larry Hagman	David Paulsen	December 23, 1983	January 17, 1984	172113	24.8/41
Clayton's announcement of his impending marriage to Miss Ellie brings more than congratulations. Ellie refuses the diamond until the "problems" are worked out, including Clayton's suggestion that Ellie leave Southfork. Cliff, taking J.R.'s bait unknowingly, wants more information on Randolph, a government offshore oil leasing agent. Not wanting to be a kept woman, Jenna shows her independence by storming out when Bobby announces that he has just bought her the boutique they are visiting. Katherine investigates Jenna's past. J.R. hits a sore spot when wind of his digging into Clayton's past gets out. Sue Ellen discovers that Peter has left school.
145	14	"Peter's Principles"	Patrick Duffy	Arthur Bernard Lewis	January 6, 1984	January 24, 1984	172114	25.4/39
Sue Ellen's worry grows as Peter decides to leave school. She agrees to see him if that will keep him in school and in town. Cliff's proposal for a joint venture in offshore drilling to Jordan and Marilee goes unheeded. J.R.'s digging makes Clayton uncomfortable to the point he brings it up to Ellie. J.R. doesn't stop though and brings up Clayton's little-known sister at family cocktails. After seeing Cliff and Marilee, Afton runs to Pam for comfort. Pam, worried that Cliff's obsession with becoming an oil tycoon may start the family feud again, arranges to meet with Bobby to discuss it. Mark and Jenna think a lot more than business discussions are going on.
146	15	"Offshore Crude"	Ray Danton	David Paulsen	January 13, 1984	January 31, 1984	172115	24.2/36
Bobby and J.R. talk about Cliff's desire to compete with the Ewings and J.R. is amused, saying he is not interested in competing with Cliff. Sue Ellen tells John Ross she has found Peter. J.R. confronts Sue Ellen and she reminds him they have an open marriage. Sue Ellen tries to avoid seeing Peter, but ends up spending the day at Southfork with him and making arrangements to meet him later. J.R. slips information to Cliff through Sly that he will go into the offshore bidding alone. J.R. offers a bribe to Randolph in exchange for information about the bids. Cliff is ecstatic with the news that J.R. will enter the bidding alone if need be. He tries to convince Marilee to invest with him.
147	16	"Some Do... Some Don't"	Larry Hagman	Leonard Katzman	January 20, 1984	February 7, 1984	172116	26.2/40
Peter is able to talk Sue Ellen out of breaking off their affair, but when she is mistaken for his mother, her resolve becomes firmer. J.R. wants to have another child, which Sue Ellen refuses to do. Miss Ellie and Clayton talk about their recent trip and upcoming marriage, then they have a serious misunderstanding. Bobby wants to buy another company against J.R.'s advice. Sly again sets Cliff up. He backs off the offshore deal after Pam tells him about Marilee. Bobby and Jenna reach an agreement, even as Katherine works on Bobby and J.R. works on her. Mark mysteriously goes into the hospital.
148	17	"Eye of the Beholder"	Leonard Katzman	Leonard Katzman	January 27, 1984	February 21, 1984	172117	26.3/41
Bobby and Jenna spend the night together. Clayton confronts Miss Ellie on her brutal treatment the night before, but she insists there is nothing to discuss and tells him to leave. J.R. is shocked that Bobby went through with the Boyd deal, but decides to sign to keep the peace. Peter agrees to go to a party with Lucy, and when he comes to pick her up, Sue Ellen runs into him and is shaken. When Afton leaves to see her brother, Cliff arranges a rendezvous with Marilee. Ellie's decision not to marry Clayton pleases J.R., but he still continues digging into his past. Pam and Bobby meet for lunch after Mark cancels. Cliff gets financial information that verifies that the Ewings could invest in offshore. J.R. pushes Randolph to "unseal" the bids and reveal the information on the top bidder.
149	18	"Twelve Mile Limit"	Patrick Duffy	David Paulsen	February 3, 1984	February 28, 1984	172118	26.7/41
J.R. arranges to sell his geologist's reports on offshore tracts to Cliff, who reluctantly spends the money for them after Marilee makes it a condition for going in with him on the venture. Miss Ellie and Clayton both admit, but not to each other, that they are frightened of the intimacies their upcoming marriage will entail. J.R. gets additional reports on Clayton's past and uses Sue Ellen to substantiate them. Donna and Ray discover Randolph unconscious from an overdose of alcohol and pills. They accuse J.R. of driving him to suicide. J.R. tells Randolph that his death will not eliminate humiliation for his family. Katherine continues to try to get a line on Jenna and is distressed when she discovers that Jenna and Bobby are intimately involved. Mark asks Pam to marry him.
150	19	"Where Is Poppa?"	William F. Claxton	Arthur Bernard Lewis	February 10, 1984	March 6, 1984	172119	25.3/28
J.R. rushes to the hospital where Sue Ellen was taken in an unconscious condition after a minor accident in front of Jenna's boutique. Sue Ellen had earlier agreed to play J.R.'s loving wife at the Andersons' anniversary party. Sue Ellen miscarries a baby she didn't know she was having. Marilee agrees to a partnership with Cliff as long as the other members of the cartel don't know about it. Cliff forms a grudging respect for J.R. after discovering that his adversary had gotten information on the offshore tracts. Bobby wants Clayton to become a greater part of the family by going into offshore drilling with him. J.R. continues to harass Katherine knowing she enjoys dangerous relationships.
151	20	"When the Bough Breaks"	Nick Havinga	Leonard Katzman	February 17, 1984	March 13, 1984	172120	26.0/41
J.R. and Peter are each convinced that they fathered the child Sue Ellen lost in the accident. Bobby is having his own doubts about Charlie's parentage and realises that the subject is hanging between him and Jenna. Katherine tracks down Naldo Marchetta, Jenna's ex-husband, and pays him to confirm her suspicions about Jenna. J.R. makes Marilee have second thoughts about becoming Cliff's partner. Clayton bows out of the offshore venture with the Ewings. Mark pushes Pam for an answer to his marriage proposal. Sue Ellen tells Peter that it's over between them.
152	21	"True Confessions"	Paul Krasny	David Paulsen	February 24, 1984	March 20, 1984	172121	26.1/40
Katherine sets up a confrontation between Naldo, Jenna and Bobby about Charlie, but is not pleased with the results and Naldo's predictions. Ray and Donna look into Randolph's past and discover the secret which J.R. is using to blackmail him. Lucy asks Peter to model with her at Southfork. J.R. gets Marilee to agree to pulling out of her deal with Cliff after the winner is declared for the offshore oil leases.
153	22	"And the Winner Is..."	Nick Havinga	Arthur Bernard Lewis	March 2, 1984	March 27, 1984	172122	25.7/41
Cliff has been set up again by J.R. and his spy, Sly, and is befuddled after the bids are opened for leases on the offshore tracts: he has offered millions over J.R.'s surprisingly low bid. Randolph confesses to Ray and Donna that he gave J.R. information, which confuses them when it seems J.R. did not use the knowledge to win the leases. Miss Ellie wants a small wedding with just family and close friends, but Clayton is upset that his sister Jessica has been invited. Katherine realises that she may have outsmarted herself by getting Jenna out of Bobby's life. J.R. overhears an incriminating conversation between Sue Ellen and Peter.
154	23	"Fools Rush In"	Michael Preece	David Paulsen	March 9, 1984	April 3, 1984	172123	26.8/42
Cliff learns he must raise $260 million to complete his offshore drilling obligations. Over Afton's objections, Cliff goes to Vaughn Leland for the huge loan unaware that J.R. and Leland are conspiring against him. J.R. also plots to get Katherine married to Bobby. Miss Ellie invites Clayton's sister, Jessica, to stay at Southfork for the upcoming wedding. Charlie goes to Bobby upset over his split with her mother. J.R. hires Peter to be John Ross' private counselor; at the same time, he is having his background investigated. Pam discovers some alarming information about Mark.
155	24	"The Unexpected"	Nick Havinga	Arthur Bernard Lewis	March 16, 1984	April 10, 1984	172124	24.4/39
J.R. is especially impressed by Jessica and her present to him; her late husband's regimental sword. Ellie's hospitality appears to be wasted on both Jessica and Clayton. J.R. and Vaughn trap Cliff into signing loan papers that have the potential to destroy him. Pam makes the decision to marry Mark out of pity when she learns he's sick. A triumphant Katherine demands that J.R. give her the tapes which he has been using to blackmail her. Bobby is unable to wish Pam luck and admits to Jenna how he is torn between his feelings for Pam and his need to hold onto her and Charlie. J.R. continues with his plan to destroy Peter and teach a lesson to Sue Ellen.
156	25	"Strange Alliance"	Larry Hagman	Leonard Katzman	March 23, 1984	April 17, 1984	172125	26.0/41
J.R. and Jessica find they share the same sentiments about Ellie and Clayton's wedding plans. J.R. tells Sue Ellen that he will be happy when Clayton joins the family, but Sue Ellen is doubtful of his sincerity. Lucy's determination to find out why Peter is not interested in her makes Sue Ellen apprehensive. Pam is frightened that her marriage to Mark will make her lose Bobby forever, even as she tries to shield Mark from finding out the truth about his health. Bobby is finally able to wish Pam and Mark happiness. However, his own future is clouded as Jenna tells him she will not wait forever for him. Sly continues to lead Cliff on and J.R. has Vaughn to put Cliff farther out on a financial limb. J.R. makes plans to frame Peter.
157	26	"Blow Up"	Patrick Duffy	David Paulsen	April 6, 1984	April 24, 1984	172126	26.3/43
Mark is so proud of Pam that he wants all his friends to witness their wedding. Pam is concerned about his health. J.R. and Jessica conspire to sabotage Miss Ellie and Clayton's wedding. Jenna and Bobby agree to try a fresh start. J.R. tries to buy Wentworth oil fields from Katherine, but she offers to sell to Bobby instead. Cliff's wells keep coming in dry and he can't understand why he needs to put up so much collateral to borrow more money. He tries to turn to Mark for help but Pam won't let him. J.R. decides its time to put the screws on Peter after Sue Ellen has a nasty scene with a drunken Lucy. Donna becomes suspicious of Jessica.
158	27	"Turning Point"	Gwen Arner	Arthur Bernard Lewis	April 13, 1984	May 1, 1984	172127	24.9/41
Clayton tries to stop his sister from conspiring with J.R., to no avail. Pam finally gives in to Mark and agrees to a big wedding. J.R. is furious with Katherine for dealing with Bobby on the sale of some Wentworth properties. Afton realises that Cliff is in big trouble when he tries to rifle her bank account. Cliff has to sell off some of his assets to get cash for his drilling without knowing that J.R. is the buyer and is pulling strings in the background. J.R. gets Peter arrested when cocaine is found in his car by the police. Jessica has an unusual reaction to Clayton's friendship with Ray.
159	28	"Love Stories"	Michael Preece	Leonard Katzman	May 4, 1984	May 8, 1984	172128	23.8/40
Bobby proposes marriage to Jenna and she accepts. J.R. sets Katherine up and she confesses her affair with J.R. to Bobby, who recognises her deceit. J.R. pretends he is concerned over Peter's arrest. Jessica attacks Clayton for selling the Southern Cross and leaving Dusty without a heritage. Cliff realises he is about to lose everything he owns. Mark discovers the truth about his health. Clayton pushes Miss Ellie to marry before J.R. and Jessica can interfere.
160	29	"Hush, Hush, Sweet Jessie"	Gwen Arner	David Paulsen	May 11, 1984	May 15, 1984	172129	24.4/43
J.R.'s snooping into Clayton and Jessica's past makes him realise that his mother may be in grave and immediate danger. The concern of the Ewings for Miss Ellie's safety increases after it is learned that she never arrived at a fashion show she was to attend with Jessica and Donna. Mark's death affects the Ewings in a variety of ways and Bobby and Jenna face Pam's need for Bobby's help. Katherine buys Cliff's share of Wentworth Tool & Die so he can continue his offshore drilling. Pam discovers Katherine's duplicity in her relationship with Bobby. Clayton makes a shocking revelation about Dusty's real mother. The Ewings fear Ellie is in serious trouble when Donna arrives to inform that she was attacked by Jessica and Ellie has been kidnapped by her.
161	30	"End Game"	Leonard Katzman	Arthur Bernard Lewis	May 18, 1984	May 22, 1984	172130	26.0/45
Tensions rise at Southfork as the search for Miss Ellie and Jessica continues. Bobby confronts J.R. over his plotting with Jessica to stop the wedding. Cliff seeks Jordan Lee's help in getting another crew for his offshore drilling. Ellie is rescued from Jessica's clutches. Pam learns that Jenna and Bobby will be getting married and she leaves Dallas with Christopher without telling anyone where she is going. Clayton and Miss Ellie marry and go on a Mediterranean cruise for their honeymoon. Katherine has an angry confrontation with Bobby after he rejects her again. J.R. reveals to Cliff that he set him up and that he is about to lose everything. Cliff gets drunk and Afton walks out of the apartment and he vows revenge against J.R. Donna receives a call that Edgar Randolph is back in Dallas looking to settle his score with J.R. After revealing his scheme to frame Peter, J.R. blackmails Sue Ellen into moving back into his bedroom but a furious Peter threatens to kill him. Cliff finally strikes oil on his offshore tract but he can't be found to be told the news. At night, an unknown assailant walks into the Ewing Oil offices and fires three bullets into the back of J.R.'s chair; but it's Bobby who has been shot...

=== Season 8 (1984–85) ===
No. overall	No. in season	Title	Directed by	Written by	Original U.S. air date	Original U.K. air date	Prod. code	Rating/share (households)
162	1	"Killer at Large"	Leonard Katzman	Arthur Bernard Lewis	September 28, 1984	November 7, 1984	173101	26.4/44
Afton discovers Bobby's body in J.R.'s office and calls an ambulance. J.R. is not worried when Ray tells him that Randolph is back in Dallas. When he learns about Bobby's shooting, J.R. assumes that he was the target, not Bobby. Cliff learns that he has struck oil. Katherine is in shock when she hears Bobby is recovering. Bobby is left blind by the bullet wound. Marilee is angry at J.R. because he talked her out of partnering with Cliff. Randolph tries to shoot J.R. but misses and he is then taken into custody as the suspected shooter, but when he is cleared by police, Bobby and J.R. realize that the real shooter is still at large.
163	2	"Battle Lines"	Nick Havinga	Arthur Bernard Lewis	October 5, 1984	November 14, 1984	173102	24.7/21
Bobby tells Donna and Ray that his office phone was bugged. Bobby tells Jenna that he won't marry her unless he regains his sight. Cliff tells Sly that he wants her to continue spying on J.R., but Sly goes back and reports everything to J.R. for whom she is really spying. Pam tells Bobby that Katherine wrote the letter that prompted their divorce. Donna moves into Bobby's office to handle his interests while he's in the hospital, which makes J.R. furious. Clayton learns of Bobby's shooting but promises not to tell Miss Ellie until they come back from their honeymoon. Cliff is arrested for the attempted murder of Bobby after the police find the gun in his townhouse.
164	3	"If at First You Don't Succeed"	Leonard Katzman	David Paulsen	October 12, 1984	November 21, 1984	173103	24.0/37
J.R. tells Bobby about Cliff's arrest and confesses that he set up Cliff and Randolph. Pam tells J.R. she plans to help Cliff ruin him. Bobby decides to have risky surgery to restore his vision. Lucy gets a waitress job at The Hot Biscuit, as the owner remembers Valene. Mandy Winger identifies Cliff in a police lineup as the man she was with at the time of Bobby's shooting. Katherine reacts strongly to a radio report that Cliff was cleared of charges. Harv Smithfield informs the Ewings that Jock's estranged brother, Jason Ewing, has died of an apparent heart attack in Alaska. Katherine enters Bobby's hospital room to give him an injection.
165	4	"Jamie"	Nick Havinga	David Paulsen	October 19, 1984	November 28, 1984	173104	24.6/40
Katherine is just about to give Bobby a fatal injection when he wakes up and begins to scream. The noise brings J.R. back into Bobby's room where he is able to stop Katherine from killing Bobby. Katherine admits to having tried to kill Bobby and is hauled off to jail. Bobby's sight returns and a week later he is back at Ewing Oil. Donna tells Bobby she's invested some of her own money in a small oil company, but hasn't told Ray yet. J.R. explains why he bugged Bobby's phone. Ray discovers Lucy's waitress job at the restaurant, but she swears him to secrecy. Jamie Ewing comes to Southfork and announces that she's the daughter of Jock's recently deceased brother.
166	5	"Family"	Leonard Katzman	Leonard Katzman	October 26, 1984	December 5, 1984	173105	25.9/42
Jamie tells the Ewings that her father died penniless and that she also has a brother. J.R. wants proof that Jamie is really a Ewing. Bobby tells J.R. that he can't get Pam off his mind. Cliff agrees to consider an offer by Jeremy Wendell that involves WestStar's acquisition of Barnes-Wentworth Oil. Jenna is puzzled when Jamie tells her that Jason liked Jenna's father, which contradicts Jenna's impression that the two men hated each other. Pam and Jackie are mystified when they spot Mark's car outside the Barnes-Wentworth offices.
167	6	"Shadow of a Doubt"	Nick Havinga	Leonard Katzman	November 2, 1984	December 12, 1984	173106	27.1/43
Wanting to prevent a powerful union between WestStar and Barnes-Wentworth, J.R. tells Sly to confirm Cliff's mistaken suspicions that he is behind the offer. Pam learns that the preservation of Mark's possessions is required until his estate is settled. Bobby is ready to make wedding plans with Jenna. Cliff rejects Wendell's offer. Pam receives flowers with a card saying that they are from Mark, which makes her believe he is indeed alive. Or is he? NOTE: This episode was filmed at Schlitterbahn in New Braunfels, Texas.
168	7	"Homecoming"	Gwen Arner	Arthur Bernard Lewis	November 9, 1984	December 19, 1984	173107	26.2/42
J.R. complains to Bobby about losing three employees to Barnes-Wentworth Oil and expresses concern about the potentially formidable Cliff/Pam alliance. Bobby wants to take down Jock's portrait at Southfork before Miss Ellie and Clayton return from their honeymoon, but J.R. disagrees saying it would dishonor Jock's memory. Pam hires a salvage specialist to search the plane wreckage in hopes of determining Mark's fate. Miss Ellie and Clayton return home. Pam decides to go out with Dave Straton, although she still thinks he is more concerned with the WestStar merger. Eddie Cronin, a customer at the restaurant where Lucy works, discovers that Lucy is a Ewing. Miss Ellie begins to realize that Clayton is sensitive to the symbols of her life with Jock.
169	8	"Oil Baron's Ball III"	Michael Preece	David Paulsen	November 16, 1984	December 26, 1984	173108	26.5/43
Unable to handle her role as J.R.'s spy, Sly requests a few months off from work. Bobby fails to persuade Pam to abandon the salvage mission and accept Mark's death. Miss Ellie treats Clayton to a night at a hotel and later surprises him with new bedroom furniture. Clayton admits he feels uncomfortable at Southfork with the shadow of Jock's memory. Cliff fears Pam is headed for a nervous breakdown. J.R. spots Mandy at the Oil Baron's Ball and wants to meet her. He is later surprised to see Mandy with Cliff. J.R. announces that Bobby and Jenna will marry in a month and Pam is devastated by the news.
170	9	"Shadows"	Gwen Arner	David Paulsen	November 23, 1984	January 2, 1985	173109	22.6/38
When Bobby verbally attacks J.R. for announcing the wedding date at the Oil Baron's Ball, J.R. swears it wasn't his intention to embarrass Pam. Miss Ellie sees that Clayton is still uneasy about Jock. J.R. hires a private detective to investigate Mandy. Donna suggests that Miss Ellie remove Jock's portrait. She does, saying it now belongs at Ewing Oil. Lucy agrees to go on a date with Eddie. Jenna sees Naldo outside her house.
171	10	"Charlie"	Michael Preece	Leonard Katzman	November 30, 1984	January 9, 1985	173110	25.9/41
Bobby advises Jenna to tell Charlie that Naldo Marchetta is her father. Jamie promises Sue Ellen that she will consider taking a job at Ewing Oil. Cliff is convinced that J.R. and Wendell have joined forces to ruin him. Ray tells Donna about Lucy's job as a waitress. Charlie disappears and Marchetta is under suspicion. J.R. introduces himself to Mandy. Cliff, hearing that J.R. has made a pass at Mandy, encourages her to accept J.R.'s advances and spy for him. Ray finds Charlie asleep in her horse's stall. Charlie later tells Jenna and Bobby that she was confused when she saw her birth certificate naming Bobby as her father.
172	11	"Barbecue Five"	Gwen Arner	Arthur Bernard Lewis	December 7, 1984	January 16, 1985	173111	24.7/38
With Cliff's approval, Mandy keeps a lunch date with J.R.. Pam visits Mandy's psychic who states that Mark is alive. Cliff confronts Wendell regarding the deal with J.R., but Wendell suggests that Cliff is paranoid and denies that J.R. was behind the merger offer. Marchetta announces that he intends to re-marry Jenna. Ray goes to the barbecue alone when Donna's business matters prevent her from attending. J.R. is pleased when he realizes that Mandy has provided a new "pipeline" to Cliff's head. When J.R. orders Jamie off the ranch, she produces a legal document stating that Ewing Oil is jointly owned by her father, Jock and Digger Barnes. Bobby gives Jenna an engagement ring week before the wedding.
173	12	"Do You Take This Woman..."	Michael Preece	Leonard Katzman	December 14, 1984	January 23, 1985	173112	25.2/39
Eddie seduces Lucy in a deserted stable. J.R. and Bobby decide to buy the WestStar fields after reading a favorable report. J.R. tells Mandy he hopes Cliff becomes preoccupied with proving Jamie's document is legal so he can move in and destroy Barnes-Wentworth Oil. Mandy passes on J.R.'s thoughts to Cliff. Jenna is panic stricken when she learns that Marchetta has picked up Charlie from school. Jenna doesn't show up for her wedding ceremony. Later, Bobby and J.R. find a note at Jenna's house saying that she can't marry Bobby because she loves someone else.
174	13	"Deja Vu"	Leonard Katzman	David Paulsen	December 21, 1984	January 30, 1985	173113	23.0/37
J.R. and Bobby plan to search for Jenna, who they believe has run away with Marchetta. Cliff tells Mandy that he doesn't want Bobby and Pam to reconcile any more than J.R. does. Pam must hide her happiness at the news of Bobby's cancelled wedding. Cliff and J.R. agree to work individually to keep Pam and Bobby apart. Marchetta tells Jenna that Charlie is on a plane to Rome and that she now must do what he says if she wants to get her back. J.R. pays off a charter pilot, Gerald Kane, to mislead Pam into searching for Mark in the Caribbean. Jenna and Marchetta marry as Bobby looks on from across the street.
175	14	"Odd Man Out"	Larry Hagman	Arthur Bernard Lewis	December 28, 1984	February 6, 1985	173114	24.5/38
J.R. tries to console Bobby about Jenna's marriage to Marchetta. Mandy tells Cliff that she likes J.R. and pretends to be teasing though she really may be serious. J.R. tells Bobby that Pam doesn't care about him because she's obsessed with finding Mark. Jenna, being held captive by Marchetta, tries to call Bobby for help. Jenna follows Marchetta into a dimly lit room and a man's hand goes over her face. A dazed Jenna, with gun in hand is cornered by police as she spots Marchetta, who lies dead on the floor nearby. NOTE: Following the broadcast of this episode in the UK, the BBC pulled their broadcasts of season 8 episodes for seven weeks due to Thames Television of ITV having bought the rights for season 9 by outbidding the BBC. The BBC then threatened to broadcast the remaining 16 episodes of season 8 directly up against ITV's season 9 episode transmissions. The controversy resulted in many questions about the issue in the British parliament. The BBC eventually relented and resumed their transmission of the remaining season 8 episodes, while the British government put heavy pressure on Thames Television to sell their rights to season 9 to the BBC at a loss, which was eventually done when Thames Television were ordered to do so by the Independent Broadcasting Authority.
176	15	"Lockup in Laredo"	Patrick Duffy	David Paulsen	January 4, 1985	March 27, 1985	173115	26.3/38
The Ewings are informed that Jenna has been arrested in Laredo for murdering Marchetta. Bobby visits Jenna who tells him that Charlie may be in Rome. Jenna pleads not guilty to the murder charge, but the judge refuses to release her on bail. Pam continues to search the clinics in the Caribbean for Mark. Eddie agrees to consider Lucy's suggestion that they become partners in a construction project. Jenna's attorney, Scotty Demerest, questions her and she says she may have been chloroformed. Jamie sees J.R. cuddling with Serena during lunch. Sue Ellen hears Jamie blasting J.R. for his behavior with Serena and JR tells Jamie to leave Southfork, and Jamie announces that she may use her document dividing Ewing Oil after all.
177	16	"Winds of War"	Leonard Katzman	Leonard Katzman	January 11, 1985	April 3, 1985	173116	27.8/41
Demerest tells Bobby that a full set of Jenna's fingerprints were found on the gun that killed Marchetta. Marchetta's accomplice, Veronica, calls and arranges to meet Bobby in California to discuss Charlie's release. Bobby later learns that she wants $50,000 and he agrees to pay it. An entry in Sam Culver's journal indicates that an agreement was signed dividing ownership of Ewing Oil between Jock, Digger and Jason. Sue Ellen tells J.R. that she wants them to have separate bedrooms again. Cliff realises that J.R. has been wooing Mandy in order to transmit false information to him. Cliff wins over Jamie who agrees to help him defeat J.R..
178	17	"Bail Out"	Michael Preece	David Paulsen	January 25, 1985	April 10, 1985	173117	26.1/39
Mandy hangs up on J.R. as he tries to make a date with her. She later confronts J.R. for using her against Cliff, but J.R. reminds her that she's guilty of the same crime. Jenna is released on bail and moves into the Southfork guest bedroom. Bobby wants to quietly marry her but Jenna can't think of marriage until the trial is over. Eddie is upset by Ray's suggestions for the apartment building specs. Pam confesses that she was only going to marry Mark because he was terminally ill. Gerald Kane meets with Pam to tell her that J.R. paid him to trick her into looking for Mark.
179	18	"Legacy of Hate"	Robert Becker	Arthur Bernard Lewis	February 1, 1985	April 17, 1985	173118	26.2/39
Pam joins forces with Cliff and Jamie to destroy Ewing Oil. Bobby is concerned by his rekindled feelings for Pam. Mandy feels guilty over sleeping with J.R. and continuing to spy for Cliff. Cliff's lawyer feels the document will withstand scrutiny in the trial to divide Ewing Oil. Lucy is blinded by her desire to please Eddie. Mandy decides she doesn't want anything to do with Cliff or J.R.. Bobby, J.R. and Miss Ellie are served with summons to a hearing attempting to freeze all Ewing Oil assets.
180	19	"Sins of the Fathers"	Larry Hagman	Leonard Katzman	February 8, 1985	April 24, 1985	173119	25.0/38
Mandy is still not sure that she's over Cliff, but tells J.R. not to call her for a few days. Cliff wins a small victory when the judge temporarily grants an injunction against Ewing Oil. A worried J.R. meets with Carl Hardesty, who previously set up dummy holding corporations for him. Cliff's victory is short-lived when the judge rescinds the injunction. Demerest tells Bobby and Jenna that Jenna's prints were on the murder weapon. Brindle gives Cliff Digger's copy of the document confirming that Jock gave Digger one-third of Ewing Oil.
181	20	"The Brothers Ewing"	Patrick Duffy	David Paulsen	February 15, 1985	May 1, 1985	173120	25.0/38
Cliff basks in the triumph of acquiring Digger's copy of the document. J.R. craves compassion from Sue Ellen, but she has no sympathy for him. Ray escorts Brindle to the airport with instructions from J.R. to call if he remembers anything else about the agreement. Pam convinces Sue Ellen to join her in Hong Kong, where Pam will continue her search for Mark. Eddie tells Betty that Lucy is just a nice kid with a lot of money.
182	21	"Shattered Dreams"	Nick Havinga	Arthur Bernard Lewis	February 22, 1985	May 8, 1985	173121	25.8/41
J.R. confides in Mandy about the hurt he feels due to the split amongst the family. Donna and Ray argue over J.R.'s tactics to save Ewing Oil. A frightened Veronica Robinson agrees to testify at Jenna's trial. Pam confesses that she still has strong feelings for Bobby. J.R. meets with Conrad Buckhouser about converting some of his assets to cash which will be placed in a Swiss bank account. Lucy is shocked when she learns that Eddie is romancing both her and Betty. Cliff tries to win points with Jamie by offering her a job at Barnes-Wentworth Oil. Bobby and Jenna discover the dead body of Veronica in the airplane lavatory.
183	22	"Dead Ends"	Michael Preece	Leonard Katzman	March 1, 1985	May 15, 1985	173122	22.6/37
Pam and Sue Ellen take in all the local colour at a Hong Kong outdoor market during their search for Mark. Jamie is hired at Barnes-Wentworth Oil as a resident expert on cold-weather drilling. Pam learns that the patient, who she believes is Mark, doesn't want to see anyone. Eddie apologizes for hurting Lucy. Donna tries to understand Ray's motivation for throwing in with J.R. J.R. and Cliff come to blows over Mandy at the Oil Barons Club. Donna strikes oil.
184	23	"Trial and Error"	Larry Hagman	David Paulsen	March 8, 1985	May 22, 1985	173123	22.4/35
During her trial, the D.A. promises to put Jenna behind bars for her crime. Pam suspects J.R. is behind her wild goose chase to Hong Kong. Bobby receives a subpoena to testify for the prosecution. Pam finally accepts the fact that Mark is dead. Due to the building pressures at home, Donna tells Miss Ellie that she's decided to move out of her house.
185	24	"The Verdict"	Patrick Duffy	David Paulsen	March 15, 1985	June 5, 1985	173124	22.7/36
Bobby prepares for his trip to L.A. to convince Veronica's sister to testify for Jenna. Ewing 17 has been shut down by the Texas Energy Commission due to the oil seepage into the drinking water. Ray attempts to convince Donna to come home. Veronica's sister gives Bobby a letter to read in court. J.R. welcomes Sue Ellen home, but realizes things are still strained between them. Jenna is found innocent of murder, but guilty of manslaughter.
186	25	"Sentences"	Michael Preece	Arthur Bernard Lewis	March 29, 1985	June 12, 1985	173125	23.0/37
Bobby vows to get Jenna out of jail. J.R. blackmails a member of the Texas Energy Commission to guarantee his future cooperation with them. Cliff and Jamie admit their mutual attraction. When Jenna is sentenced to seven years, Bobby comes forward and says he's Charlie's father to prevent her from becoming a ward of the state. Sue Ellen is humiliated by J.R.'s public flaunting of his affair with Mandy. Sue Ellen threatens to divorce J.R.. J.R. tells an upset Pam that Bobby claimed to be Charlie's father as a precautionary measure. Cliff is furious when he learns that his Tract 340 has been shut down due to leakages. Jenna tells Bobby she wants him to be free.
187	26	"Terms of Estrangement"	Alexander Singer	Peter Dunne	April 12, 1985	June 19, 1985	173126	22.1/36
J.R. plans to reunite Pam and Bobby, hoping that she would no longer side with Cliff in the fight against Ewing Oil. J.R. is upset when he sees Mandy giving her phone number to someone. While viewing a tape from Veronica's flight, Bobby, Ray and Norman notice a man putting drugs in her drink. J.R. agrees to meet a man who says he has valuable information about the Ewing Oil lawsuit, but he wants 10 percent of Ewing Oil in return for the information. J.R. insults Sue Ellen which only makes her more determined to survive in the marriage. Cliff gives Jamie an engagement ring. Lucy receives an answer to her letter from Mitch. Jenna's case is re-opened. Jamie's brother Jack comes to Dallas.
188	27	"The Ewing Connection"	Nick Havinga	Arthur Bernard Lewis	April 19, 1985	June 26, 1985	173127	21.1/35
J.R. presents the deal to be made with Jack to Bobby and Ray. If his information is valid, Bobby and J.R. will split Jack's request for 10 percent of Ewing Oil. Lucy is excited about her visit to see Mitch. Jack reveals himself to J.R., Bobby and Ray as Jason's son. Donna tells Miss Ellie that divorce is the only answer for her and Ray. John Ross stays home from school with a slight temperature. Later, when he passes out, Ray, Clayton and Miss Ellie rush him to the hospital. The diagnosis is appendicitis. J.R. verbally abuses Sue Ellen for being a bad mother and she turns to her alcohol for comfort.
189	28	"Deeds and Misdeeds"	Michael Preece	David Paulsen	May 3, 1985	July 3, 1985	173128	21.4/36
J.R. is secretly pleased that Sue Ellen is drinking again.Donna finds out she is pregnant. Pam loans Cliff money when he has a cash flow problem after his wells are shut down. J.R. assures Mandy that Sue Ellen will soon be out of his life and Southfork. Jack tells the Ewings that a man named Windham can verify that Cliff and Jamie have no legal claim to Ewing Oil. Cliff and Jamie are married by a Justice of the Peace. Lucy and Mitch reflect on why their marriage failed. Donna doesn't get the chance to tell Ray that she's pregnant.
190	29	"Deliverance"	Nick Havinga	Peter Dunne	May 10, 1985	July 10, 1985	173129	22.6/38
Bobby and a police detective interrogate the uncooperative hit man who maintains his innocence. J.R. deliberately fuels Cliff's determination to proceed with the lawsuit. Cliff suspects that J.R. and Jack are working together. Pam and Bobby declare their love for each other. Donna and Ray have another fight and she doesn't tell him that she's pregnant. Bobby formulates a plan to make the killer confess. Mitch asks Lucy to move in with him. A decision is rendered regarding Ewing Oil. J.R. wants to institutionalize Sue Ellen for her drinking problem.
191	30	"Swan Song"	Leonard Katzman	Leonard Katzman	May 17, 1985	July 17, 1985	173130	27.5/46
Sue Ellen gets drunk at the Ewing victory party. Donna tells Ray about her pregnancy. J.R. reassures Mandy that the problem with Sue Ellen will be resolved. Bobby is confused about who he should marry. Sue Ellen assures Clayton and Miss Ellie that she has stopped drinking. Mitch and Lucy re-marry. Cliff considers an annulment of his marriage to Jamie. Dusty re-appears. J.R. asks Sue Ellen to agree to end their marriage. Bobby proposes to Pam, and she accepts. Jamie surprises Cliff during their conversation about an annulment. As Bobby leaves Pam's house, a car drives straight towards her; Bobby pushes Pam out of the way and the car hits him; the car crashes and the driver is revealed to be Katherine Wentworth, who is dead. With Pam, Jenna, J.R., Miss Ellie, Clayton, Ray and Donna at his hospital bedside, Bobby dies of massive internal injuries.

=== Season 9 (1985–86) ===
No. overall	No. in season	Title	Directed by	Written by	Original U.S. air date	Original U.K. air date	Prod. code	Rating/share (households)
192	1	"The Family Ewing"	Nick Havinga	Leonard Katzman	September 27, 1985	March 5, 1986	174101	23.9/38
The Ewings gather at Southfork to mourn Bobby. Cliff and Jamie try to comfort Pam, who blames herself for Bobby's death and frets one day Christopher will blame her as well. Miss Ellie decides to bury Bobby on a beautiful green hill overlooking Southfork near a tree house Jock built for him. Gary returns to Southfork and provides a shoulder for Ellie to lean on. Sue Ellen goes on a bender after J.R. insults her for not being there when Bobby said goodbye to everyone on his deathbed. Dusty wants to take care of Sue Ellen, and J.R. seems more than happy to get Sue Ellen out of his life. Pam tries her best to explain what happened to Christopher, as J.R. does to John Ross as well. Ellie tries to explain to Sue Ellen that she is an alcoholic, and that Dusty cannot offer her the kind of help she needs. Dusty, however, takes extraordinary measures to stop one of her binges. Bobby’s funeral is a small family event. Most of the family members move away and return to the house, leaving J.R. alone with the casket to say a personal and emotional final goodbye to his brother. NOTE: In February 1985 in the UK, the BBC pulled their broadcasts of season 8 episodes due to Thames Television of ITV having bought the rights for season 9 by outbidding the BBC. The BBC then threatened to broadcast the remaining 16 episodes of season 8 directly up against ITV's season 9 episode transmissions. The controversy resulted in many questions being asked about the issue in the British parliament. The BBC eventually relented and resumed their transmission of the remaining season 8 episodes after seven weeks off the air. Ultimately, numerous other ITV franchises, particularly Granada Television and Yorkshire Television were not happy with the deal, and thus complained to the regulatory Independent Broadcasting Authority. This eventually resulted in Thames Television backing down on their plans, and compelled to sell (season nine, the dream season) back to the BBC, at a financial loss. Dallas continued to be broadcast on the BBC, being shown on BBC1 until the end of the series run in 1991. The controversy was the main reason for the BBC transmissions of season 9 episodes in the UK being many months further behind the US broadcasts on CBS than usual.
193	2	"Rock Bottom"	Michael Preece	Joel J. Feigenbaum	September 27, 1985	March 5, 1986	174102	23.9/38
Sue Ellen has a sudden change of heart about leaving Southfork when she leaves Bobby‘s funeral. She tells Dusty it was a mistake for her to walk out and that she plans to go back. J.R. is not impressed with her return and his harsh rejection turns her, once again, to alcohol. Bobby’s will is read to the family and it is discovered that he left his share of Ewing Oil to Christopher, in Pam’s trust. J.R. can’t believe he may have to be in partnership with Pam, while Cliff wants nothing more than to arrange for Pam to sell the shares to him. While in a bar, a drunk Sue Ellen attracts a man who volunteers to take her home and then robs her of her Mercedes. The next morning, without her purse, identification, or any sense of herself, Sue Ellen wanders through an unfamiliar part of town. A bag lady offers her a drink, but Sue Ellen disdainfully rejects the offer. Mandy worries about the fact that J.R. is still a married man. Clayton and Ellie fear about Sue Ellen and go off to look for her. Sue Ellen returns to the bag lady she once shunned and now greedily shares her bottle of cheap wine.
194	3	"Those Eyes"	Nick Havinga	Peter Dunne	October 4, 1985	March 12, 1986	174103	23.8/37
Clayton and Miss Ellie intensify their search for Sue Ellen, who Ellie feels very strongly must be in trouble. J.R. tries to buy Christopher’s Ewing Oil shares while Jeremy Wendell of Weststar Oil works with Cliff to convince Pam to sell her Ewing Oil shares to them. Pam is truly torn between wanting to do the right thing for Christopher and wondering what Bobby would want her to do. Clayton and Ellie finally find Sue Ellen. She has been moved from the city drunk tank to a detoxification ward. Dusty comes to the detox ward and gives Sue Ellen some gentle assurance. J.R. arrives and he and Dusty exchange punches while Sue Ellen, traumatized, begins to scream and quake all over. Miss Ellie convinces J.R. to commit Sue Ellen to a sanitarium.
195	4	"Resurrection"	Michael Preece	Hollace White & Stephanie Garman	October 11, 1985	March 19, 1986	174104	21.8/36
Miss Ellie begins to wonder if she too should sell her shares of Ewing Oil to Weststar. Although she doesn’t want the family business to come to an end, she also does not want a repeat of the struggle for control that tore Bobby and J.R. apart after Jock’s death. Sue Ellen discovers that she has no choice but to join an alcoholics program at the clinic. Dusty bribes an attendant at the clinic Sue Ellen is in to let him see her. Clayton warns Dusty that his involvement with Sue Ellen is poorly timed, but Dusty seems very determined to make it work out this time. Sue Ellen is tempted when an attendant at the clinic offers her a drink, for a price. Although she is tempted, she ferociously rings for someone to come help her. Cliff continues to pressure Pam to sell to Wendell. Unable to deal with the business or the decisions she needs to make, Pam runs from the house and gets quite a shock when she runs into Mark Graison.
196	5	"Saving Grace"	Nick Havinga	Joel J. Feigenbaum	October 18, 1985	March 26, 1986	174105	22.3/36
Pam is stunned at seeing Mark. Mark tells Pam that there's no cure for his blood disease, but he's in remission. He tells her that he staged his death in order to spare her and search for a cure. J.R. is annoyed when his private investigator doesn't find any dirt on Jack so he instructs the detective to investigate Wendell. Cliff gets two weeks to firm up Jack and Pam's commitments to sell Ewing Oil shares to Wendell. Sue Ellen gets a stark report on her future and she decides to commit totally to rehab. Mandy listens to a seductive message J.R. leaves on her phone, but tells herself she can't pick up where they left off. Cliff and Jamie are stunned when Pam stops by with Mark. Ray cautions Jack not to trust J.R.. Ellie asks Dusty to stay away from Sue Ellen until she's recovered. Sue Ellen vows to beat her addiction, even when she learns that J.R. refuses to help her. Jack is awakened by an intruder who steals his passport. Mark attacks J.R. after he discovers J.R. sent Pam on a wild goose chase looking for him, and vows to ruin Ewing Oil.
197	6	"Mothers"	Michael Preece	Hollace White & Stephanie Garman	October 25, 1985	April 2, 1986	174106	22.7/37
J.R. nominates Bobby for the man of the year award at the Oil Baron's Ball. Cliff learns of the break-in at Jack's and wonders what he has to hide. Dusty tells Clayton and Ellie that he's going to Cheyenne for his divorce hearing but plans to come back for Sue Ellen. Mark explains to Kenderson that he decided to reenter Pam's life because she was in trouble. He says he has been honest with her about his condition. Kenderson agrees to head a blood disease research center that Mark wants to found. Sue Ellen discusses her parents and J.R. with her therapist who wants her to concentrate on the future. Sue Ellen's mother arrives for a short stay at Southfork. Ellie tells Clayton that Patricia has never been anything but trouble for Sue Ellen and everybody else. Sue Ellen takes pleasure in helping a fellow patient. Mark agrees to meet with Wendell to discuss his offer. An unseen photographer takes pictures of Jenna, Charlie and Jack then Jack by himself. Ellie advises Ray to make his own decision about selling his shares. Jack tells Ray he's attracted to Jenna but Ray warns it will take her a while to get over Bobby. Ray also reminds Jack that their third option with the sale is to simply side with whatever Miss Ellie decides to do. Patricia tells Sue Ellen she plans to stay in Dallas to help Sue Ellen regain her life. J.R. finds out that Mandy moved out of her apartment. Pam explains to J.R. that she decided to take Wendell's offer because it seems the better long-term interest for Christopher. J.R. feels utterly defeated. Ellie tells Clayton she's decided to sell to Wendell. Ellie goes to Ewing Oil and hears J.R. talking aloud to Bobby. She's disturbed to hear him say he's taking John Ross and leaving Dallas.
198	7	"The Wind of Change"	Corey Allen	Peter Dunne	November 1, 1985	April 9, 1986	174107	23.5/38
Miss Ellie and Pam make their final decisions on the Weststar offer; Donna and Ray get bad news about her pregnancy; Sue Ellen continues to progress in her recovery; Jack woos Jenna further; Mandy shows up at the Oil Baron's Ball
199	8	"Quandary"	Michael Preece	Joel J. Feigenbaum	November 8, 1985	April 16, 1986	174108	22.7/36
Ray and Donna investigate options to deal with their baby's condition; Dusty claims he's staying in Dallas; J.R. immediately seeks to find a way to rid himself of Pam; Cliff wants Jamie back; Angelica Nero wines and dines the town's oilmen.
200	9	"Close Encounters"	Corey Allen	Hollace White & Stephanie Garman	November 15, 1985	April 23, 1986	174109	23.1/35
Angelica attends a Southfork Rodeo; Sue Ellen's mother warns her away from Dusty; J.R. offers Jack a job at Ewing Oil. Donna is rushed to the hospital, with her and the baby's life at risk.
201	10	"Suffer the Little Children"	Michael Preece	Leonard Katzman	November 22, 1985	April 30, 1986	174110	22.0/33
Cliff tries to repair his relationships with Jamie and Pam; Sue Ellen renews the custody battle with J.R., who's busy discovering Angelica's past.
202	11	"The Prize"	Corey Allen	Hollace White & Stephanie Garman	November 29, 1985	May 7, 1986	174111	21.4/34
John Ross runs away as the custody fight comes to a close; Angelica tries to rush her deal with Ewing Oil, while J.R. continues to investigate her motives.
203	12	"En Passant"	Michael Preece	Peter Dunne & Joel J. Feigenbaum	December 6, 1985	May 14, 1986	174112	22.0/35
J.R. appeals his loss of John Ross' custody; Donna and Ray deal with the loss of their baby in very different ways; J.R.'s kidnapped detective is used by Angelica and Nicholas to further the Marinos venture; Sue Ellen and her mother argue over her future.
204	13	"Goodbye, Farewell, and Amen"	Linda Day	Will Lorin	December 13, 1985	May 21, 1986	174113	22.6/35
J.R. hopes to trick Sue Ellen into giving up custody; Jenna breaks things off with Jack; Pam wants to vacation with Mark; Clayton makes a deal without Miss Ellie's knowledge.
205	14	"Curiosity Killed the Cat"	Larry Hagman	Deanne Barkley	December 20, 1985	May 28, 1986	174114	21.1/35
Clayton shields Miss Ellie from his financial pinch; Ray and Donna move into Southfork; Cliff tries to tell Mandy that J.R. doesn't care about her; Jack goes missing.
206	15	"The Missing Link"	Linda Day	Bill Taub	January 3, 1986	June 11, 1986	174115	21.9/33
Pam seeks answers about the emerald from Matt Cantrell; Mandy double-crosses J.R.; Jack is still missing, and his presence is needed more than ever; Sue Ellen starts working.
207	16	"Twenty-Four Hours"	Robert Becker	Hollace White & Stephanie Garman	January 10, 1986	June 25, 1986	174116	22.1/34
The search for Jack takes new urgency as Jamie lies near death; Donna starts working with those suffering from Down Syndrome; Angelica reveals why Jack is so important to her; Pam seeks a way to work with Mark.
208	17	"The Deadly Game"	Larry Hagman	Bill Taub	January 17, 1986	July 2, 1986	174117	23.2/36
Jamie slowly recovers at the hospital; J.R. recruits Marilee Stone into the Marinos deal; Clayton's problems ease, not knowing Miss Ellie is the source; Pam arranges for a visit to Mark's Colombian emerald mine.
209	18	"Blame It on Bogota"	Robert Becker	Peter Dunne	January 24, 1986	July 9, 1986	174118	22.0/34
J.R. and Cantrell continue their plot to set up Pam; Angelica grows unhappy over the profit-sharing arrangement from the Marinos deal; Mark feels he and Pam may not have a future.
210	19	"Shadow Games"	Roy Campanella II	Joel J. Feigenbaum	January 31, 1986	July 16, 1986	174119	20.9/33
Pam and Matt get to Colombia; Sue Ellen's newfound stability makes J.R. reevaluate her; Clayton finds out Miss Ellie bailed him out; Donna confides to Miss Ellie that her baby would've been born with mental retardation; Jenna becomes increasingly despondent over Bobby's death.
211	20	"Missing"	Michael A. Hoey	Leonard Katzman	February 7, 1986	July 23, 1986	174120	22.2/34
J.R. and local authorities try to locate Pam, who has disappeared in Colombia; Jack succumbs to Grace's wiles; Mandy stops working for Cliff.
212	21	"Dire Straits"	Bruce Bilson	Joel J. Feigenbaum & Peter Dunne	February 14, 1986	July 30, 1986	174121	21.0/32
Mark and Cliff work to secure Pam's release; Jenna sinks deeper into depression; Donna grows close to a child with mental retardation; J.R. thinks he understands Dimitri; Mandy confesses her treachery.
213	22	"Overture"	Corey Allen	Hollace White & Stephanie Garman	February 21, 1986	August 6, 1986	174122	20.8/32
J.R. shows an increasingly active interest in reconciling with Sue Ellen; Jenna begins to realize she can't deal with her grief over Bobby alone; Pam wants to explore the emerald mine; Ray takes interest in a deaf foster child named Tony.
214	23	"Sitting Ducks"	Linda Day	Susan Howard	February 28, 1986	August 13, 1986	174123	20.6/34
J.R. grows more suspicious of Angelica and the Marinos deal; Pam must defend her job at Ewing Oil; Lucy's wedding rattles Jenna; Ray continues to grow fond of an orphaned deaf boy.
215	24	"Masquerade"	Larry Hagman	Leonard Katzman	March 7, 1986	August 20, 1986	174124	20.9/33
J.R. and Jack are unaware of the danger they're in at the Martinique conference; Pam questions her role at Ewing Oil; Jenna nears a total mental breakdown.
216	25	"Just Desserts"	Linda Gray	Peter Dunne & Joel J. Feigenbaum	March 14, 1986	August 27, 1986	174125	19.9/31
Angelica disappears in the aftermath of the assassination attempt; Jenna plans to leave Dallas; Ray talks to Donna about adopting; Pam makes a decision regarding her employment at Ewing Oil.
217	26	"Nothing's Ever Perfect"	Bruce Bilson	Leonard Katzman	March 21, 1986	September 3, 1986	174126	19.4/32
Having regained control of Ewing Oil, J.R. sets his sights firmly on Sue Ellen; Ray and Donna start adoption procedures; Angelica plots revenge; Jenna second-guesses leaving Southfork.
218	27	"J.R. Rising"	Linda Day	Joel J. Feigenbaum & Peter Dunne	April 4, 1986	September 10, 1986	174127	19.8/32
J.R. tries to get a bigger piece of the Marinos deal; Ray's manslaughter conviction hampers the adoption proceedings; Matt makes an emerald strike; Angelica comes back to the United States.
219	28	"Serendipity"	Bruce Bilson	Leonard Katzman	April 11, 1986	September 17, 1986	174128	20.0/33
Cliff thinks J.R.'s set him and the cartel up for failure in the Marinos deal; Donna and Ray work on Tony's reluctance to be adopted; Jamie fears a new Barnes/Ewing feud is brewing; Angelica makes a beeline for Dallas.
220	29	"Thrice in a Lifetime"	Jerry Jameson	Joel J. Feigenbaum & Peter Dunne	May 2, 1986	September 24, 1986	174129	19.7/34
The cartel is ready to join Cliff to battle J.R.; Pam and Mark make wedding preparations; Angelica moves forward with her revenge scheme; the Krebbs meet more obstacles in their quest to adopt Tony.
221	30	"Hello, Goodbye, Hello"	Nick Havinga	Leonard Katzman	May 9, 1986	October 1, 1986	174130	18.6/32
New ranch hand Ben Stivers prompts suspicion from Clayton and Punk; J.R. gets valuable information against Mark Graison, but finds Ewing Oil in danger; Ray and Donna get a hearing in their adoption case; Angelica gets closer to her revenge.
222	31	"Blast from the Past"	Michael Preece	Joel J. Feigenbaum & Peter Dunne	May 16, 1986	October 8, 1986	174131	24.9/42
J.R. pledges himself anew to Sue Ellen; Angelica brings her revenge plot to fruition; Ray and Donna learn they are allowed to adopt Tony; Pam and Mark are married, but she awakens to a surprise in her shower. Note: All events in these season 9 episodes, plus the events of the latter part of the season 8 finale, are a dream by Pam, so thus all the events in this season did not actually happen in the Dallas universe. This episode also carries the strange and obvious credit “Starring Patrick Duffy as...” (with the space under where his character name might have been seen left blank for purposes of the cliffhanger). For its twist, the episode was ranked as #4 as part of the "Top 100 Most Unexpected Moments in TV History" by TV Guide and TV Land.

=== Season 10 (1986–87) ===
No. overall	No. in season	Title	Directed by	Written by	Original U.S. air date	Original U.K. air date	Prod. code	Rating/share (households)
223	1	"Return to Camelot"	Leonard Katzman	Leonard Katzman & Mitchell Wayne Katzman	September 26, 1986	October 22, 1986	175101	26.5/44
224	2	"Return to Camelot"	Leonard Katzman	Leonard Katzman & Mitchell Wayne Katzman	September 26, 1986	October 22, 1986	175101	26.5/44
Pam finds Bobby in the shower; his death and all the events of the previous season are revealed as Pam's dream. Prices of oil are sinking because OPEC is exporting much cheap oil to the country. Ewing Oil and the other companies have to shut down some smaller wells. Bobby tells both Jenna and Charlie that he is going to marry Pam again. J.R. and Cliff are both quite unhappy with that. Cliff presented to the cartel an idea about creating a lobbying group in D.C. to enforce higher taxes on imported oil. He said the idea was his, but in fact, it was Jamie's. J.R. offers Jack to buy off his 10% of Ewing Oil. Ray bought a new house for him and Donna, but she didn't like the idea of them getting back together even though she still loves him. J.R. offers to Donna a head position of the lobbyist group and she agreed. One of Ewing 12 wells was blown up. Jenna and Charlie move out of Southfork into a house in Braddock. Ray and Clayton hired a new ranch foreman, Wes Parmalee. The fire at Ewing 12 is controlled and the field is shut down. Mandy and Sue Ellen meet. Sue Ellen swore to herself never to drink again and she hired a man to stalk Mandy and J.R. Wes has a picture of young Miss Ellie.
225	3	"Pari Per Sue"	Michael Preece	David Paulsen	October 3, 1986	October 29, 1986	175102	21.6/34
Jeremy Wendell offers to buy Ewing Oil, J.R. and Bobby decline the offer. J.R. argued with Jack and almost kicked him out of the visit at Southfork. Mandy is scared, as she noticed the man Sue Ellen hired and she thinks he is trying to kill her. Cliff wants to buy Jack's share of Ewing Oil. Sue Ellen bought a Valentines Lingerie Shop with the owner Mr Valentine getting 10%.
226	4	"Once and Future King"	Leonard Katzman	Calvin Clements, Jr.	October 10, 1986	November 5, 1986	175103	19.5/32
Cliff is not satisfied with Donna as the head of the group and he tries to get a man on her position, but Bobby stands up for her and convinced the other oilmen to do the same thing. Cliff gives Jack a check for $500,000 to make sure that if he one day decides to sell his share of Ewing Oil, Cliff would be the first to buy it. Sue Ellen is starting a campaign for her Valentine Lingerie Shop and wants to hire Mandy to model for her. Cliff and Jamie had one of their fights again. The wife of the man who blew up one of the wells came to Bobby begging him to stop the trial against him. Miss Ellie has a feeling that she and Wes met before. Donna left for D.C.. Pamela convinced Bobby to talk to the man who blew up the wells, but when they arrive to the town, he was found dead in jail. J.R. found out about the private detective. Miss Ellie came to Wes' bunkhouse and found Jock's buckle, knife and letters within Wes' things. He told her that those things always belonged to him, hinting he's Jock.
227	5	"Enigma"	Michael Preece	Leah Markus	October 17, 1986	November 12, 1986	175104	22.1/36
Miss Ellie orders Wes off of Southfork and rejects his claims. Ray tracks Wes down, looking for answers. Miss Ellie reveals Wes' story to Jock's closest friend Punk Anderson. J.R., furious with Sue Ellen for having him and Mandy followed, offers her a divorce. J.R. and Mandy fall unwittingly into Sue Ellen's plot as her Lingerie Company employs a sexy model. J.R. and Bobby are shocked when they turn to the Cattlemen's Bank for a multimillion dollar loan. Donna is in Washington, lobbying to assist the oil industry. She is puzzled when she calls Ray and Jenna answers the phone. J.R. continues trying to raise the price of oil.
228	6	"Trompe L'Oeil"	Leonard Katzman	Leonard Katzman	October 24, 1986	November 19, 1986	175105	20.3/33
Clayton warns Wes that he will fight to keep him off Southfork and away from Ellie. J.R. and Bobby are convinced that Wes' claims are false until he pays them a visit at Ewing Oil. Ellie keeps her mind off of Wes by helping Pam plan her wedding. Sue Ellen's plan to get even with J.R. goes better than she expected. The unexpected arrival of his ex-wife shakes Jack's contemplation of riches from his ten percent share of Ewing Oil. With fifty percent of Ewing Oil as a guarantee, J.R. and Bobby start expanding the business. J.R.'s meeting with B.D. Calhoun leaves him confident that oil prices will rise again.
229	7	"Territorial Imperative"	Michael Preece	David Paulsen	October 31, 1986	November 26, 1986	175106	20.5/33
Sue Ellen's company, Valentine, is a huge success. April meets J.R. who advises her that the 10% of Ewing Oil is not worth that much due to the price slump. Wes visits Ellie at Southfork & tells her things only she and he knows about their second honeymoon. Cliff offers April Stevens to buy Ewing Oil if she manages to get her share off Jake. Pam & Bobby as well as Christopher catch Charlie hanging around with a nasty crowd & by force takes her home. Jenna tells Pam & Bobby to keep out of their lives. Ellie is worried about Wes & tells over lunch Mavis that she senses something about Wes that stops her dismissing him as a hoax. Ray denies to Donna that he is sleeping with Jenna & tells her its none of her business. Donna tells Ray that she still loves him but cannot to return to him into his new home. J.R. is getting annoyed at the attraction Mandy is creating with her new modelling. Sue Ellen visits Wes & offers him help to stay. Jenna gets shocking & upsetting results from her doctor.
230	8	"The Second Time Around"	Leonard Katzman	Calvin Clements, Jr.	November 7, 1986	December 3, 1986	175107	21.6/34
Wes agrees to go under medical investigation. Bobby and Pam's wedding day arrives, with Ray making a startling announcement that Jenna's pregnant with Bobby's baby. Jamie attends the wedding with Jack and is shocked to see Cliff arrive with April. Wes shows up and refuses to leave until Ellie agrees to meet him later.
231	9	"Bells Are Ringing"	Michael Preece	Leah Markus	November 14, 1986	December 10, 1986	175108	23.7/37
Pam and Bobby's bliss is shattered by an outburst from Ray on their wedding day. J.R. uses the outburst as a last attempt to get Jenna to the wedding. Banks' fears over Wes' claim make them freeze Ewing Oil's credit. April plots against Jack. J.R. continues his scheme to raise the price of oil.
232	10	"Who's Who at the Oil Baron's Ball?"	Leonard Katzman	David Paulsen	November 21, 1986	December 17, 1986	175109	21.5/34
Disagreement continue between Miss Ellie and Clayton over Wes Parmalee. Clayton feels he has to fight both Parmalee and Jock's ghost. A Hollywood producer named Bruce Harvey expresses an interest in Mandy Winger. J.R. is concerned about Bobby's situation, with Jenna's baby on the way. The C.I.A. warns J.R. against associating with B.D. Calhoun. Cliff invites April to the Oil Baron's Ball. Ray tells Donna that the fate of Jenna's baby should be entirely her choice. J.R. wants April to sell him 5 percent of Ewing Oil. Cliff wants his $500,000 back from Jack. Parmalee's x-ray offer more surprise for J.R. and Bobby. Pam and Bobby meet April Stevens. Jenna and Ray stay away from the Oil Baron's Ball. At the ball, Parmalee shocks the oil community by claiming he's Jock Ewing. Parmalee agrees to take a lie-detector test. Clayton threatens to kill Parmalee.
233	11	"Proof Positive"	Michael Preece	Calvin Clements, Jr.	November 28, 1986	December 24, 1986	175110	21.1/35
Wes makes a stunning disclosure at the Oil Baron's Ball. After he is confronted by J.R., Clayton, and Bobby, Wes agrees to take a lie detector test in order to prove he is Jock. Ellie requests another secret meeting with Wes. Clayton arrives at a disturbing conclusion. April plots to cash in on her former marriage to Jack. Pam makes an unsettling proposition she wants to buy Jenna's baby. Sue Ellen forces a showdown with J.R. Jamie reaches a decision about her marriage to Cliff. NOTE: The set featured in the test screening for Mandy's film is the set for Mack (Kevin Dobson) and Karen MacKenzie's (Michele Lee) kitchen on spin-off series Knots Landing.
234	12	"Something Old, Something New"	Leonard Katzman	Leah Markus	December 5, 1986	December 31, 1986	175111	21.9/34
With the evidence mounting that Wes Parmalee is really Jock, Bobby leaves for South America in search of information to disprove the claim. Bobby faces the grim duty of retracing Jock's accident in South America. J.R. pressures a confused Miss Ellie to declare Parmalee a fraud. Sue Ellen cashes in on her plot to get back at J.R. and Mandy learns who the benefactor of her good fortune has been. Donna continues her lobbying duties in Washington D.C. J.R. attempts to abort his plan with B.D. Calhoun to raise the price of oil. Miss Ellie reluctantly meets Parmalee for dinner.
235	13	"Bar-B-Cued"	Michael Preece	David Paulsen	December 12, 1986	January 7, 1987	175112	20.8/33
Bobby returns from South America with evidence regarding Wes Parmalee, but it's an unexpected and uninvited guest who provides Miss Ellie with the shocking truth. J.R. and Clayton grow closer as a result of the Parmalee calamity. Pam seals her business deal with Cliff before he is cornered into paying for Jamie's service as oil consultant. Parmalee has interesting encounters with both Jeremy Wendell and April Stevens. J.R. receives reassuring news concerning B.D. Calhoun and the Middle East. Jack gives Jamie an unusual gift. Donna has a brief but intriguing meeting with an important senator in her efforts for the oil lobby. Cliff provides further sparks at the barbecue.
236	14	"The Fire Next Time"	Patrick Duffy	David Paulsen	December 19, 1986	January 14, 1987	175113	21.2/34
An angry Clayton goes on a manhunt. Miss Ellie seeks the aid of her sons in calming her furious husband. J.R., confident that the Middle East situation is at rest, learns some frightening news concerning B.D. Calhoun. Donna returns to Dallas with a decision about her marriage to Ray she hands him divorce papers. Jeremy Wendell approaches Cliff with a devious business proposition
237	15	"So Shall Ye Reap"	Jerry Jameson	Leonard Katzman	January 2, 1987	January 21, 1987	175114	21.8/32
Threatened by B.D. Calhoun's menacing presence, J.R. takes the necessary steps to rid himself of the mercenary. Pam's suspicious investigation into some of Cliff's business "deals" prompts him into reconsidering Jeremy Wendell's proposition. Jenna attempts to sever more ties to Bobby by selling her boutique and giving Bobby a cheque which he tells Pam he going to put in a Trust Fund for Jenna and his baby. April Stevens eyes a fortuitous opportunity when she "accidentally" runs into Ewing Oil nemesis, Jeremy Wendell. Donna decides to move off of Southfork.
238	16	"Tick, Tock"	Patrick Duffy	Mitchell Wayne Katzman	January 9, 1987	January 28, 1987	175115	23.1/36
Sue Ellen is unsuspecting when Calhoun, whom she knows as Peter Duncan, "accidentally" bumps into her and Pam. Ray feels the frustration of losing his wife and his unborn child. Pam's increasing overprotective nature around Christopher concerns Bobby. Jeremy Wendell pursues his plan to ruin Ewing Oil. Ray and Clayton, in an effort to forget their troubles, resume their work together in the horse cutting business.
239	17	"Night Visitor"	Larry Hagman	Calvin Clements, Jr.	January 23, 1987	February 4, 1987	175116	22.3/34
Ewing Oil makes a financial comeback as Bobby and J.R. secure important deals, but J.R. is too overcome with anxiety about B.D. Calhoun to savor the success. Bobby becomes suspicious when J.R. acts overly concerned about Southfork's security system. Cliff reluctantly goes through with Jeremy Wendell's plan to undermine Ewing Oil. April Stevens continues her ploy to get her 5 percent share of the company. Ray and Jenna's friendship is put on hold while he decides to pursue a custody case with Donna for his unborn child, but she is unexpectedly rushed to the hospital in Washington D.C. with excruciating stomach pains. Sue Ellen has another inauspicious run-in with "Peter Duncan".
240	18	"Cat and Mouse"	Michael Preece	Leah Markus	January 30, 1987	February 11, 1987	175117	21.2/34
Donna is in hospital with an appendicitis gets a visit from Ray and Andrew Dowling. Ray is getting concerned about the relationship Donna has with Andrew Dowling. Ray is advised by his lawyer to stop seeing Jenna till his divorce is over. Meanwhile, Charlie & Jenna are missing Ray, but Jenna is unable to explain to Charlie why they can't see him. No one at first shares Pam's concern that Sue Ellen didn't call to say she wasn't coming home for dinner. While J.R. skips family dinner to spend time with April. In the morning Bobby calls the police to report Sue Ellen as missing. J.R. then suddenly arrives home and moments later Sue Ellen. The family suspect her to have started drinking again. J.R. confronts Sue Ellen with photos of her & Calhoun in bed together. Sue Ellen denies the affair & suspects that she must have been drugged by Calhoun. J.R. admits to Bobby about his dealings with Calhoun. Bobby enlarges the photos of Calhoun & Sue Ellen and so names the hotel Calhoun is staying at. Cliff reluctantly tricks Pam in telling him which company Ewing Oil is bidding to buy & passes the information to Jeremy Wendell. Cliff gets drunk with guilt. Clayton continues his unsuccessful hunt for Wes. Bobby & J.R. find a video message from Calhoun waiting for them at the hotel. NOTE: Cliff's one-night stand is played by Brenda Strong, who would go on the play Ann Ewing in the TNT continuation of Dallas.
241	19	"High Noon for Calhoun"	David Paulsen	David Paulsen	February 6, 1987	February 18, 1987	175118	21.6/34
Fearing for the safety of their families, J.R. and Bobby send Sue Ellen, Pam, John Ross and Christopher off to California to escape the menacing threat of B.D. Calhoun. But when the mercenary locates them, J.R. is forced into a deadly showdown with the terrorist. April experiences loneliness pangs. Cliff throws himself into a precarious deal and is frantic when Pam isn't there to back him up financially. Andrew Dowling continues to entertain Donna. Miss Ellie and Clayton enjoy a private weekend away from Southfork. Meanwhile in California Calhoun kidnaps John Ross, and plays a game of cat and mouse with J.R. The situation comes to a head when J.R. is shot and Calhoun turns the gun on John Ross, J.R. must watch his son die. Bobby and Ray come to the rescue killing Calhoun.
242	20	"Olio"	Steve Kanaly	Leonard Katzman	February 13, 1987	March 11, 1987	175119	19.5/32
J.R. pays an emotional price for his involvement with B.D. Calhoun, but he may face a bigger danger with the law for toiling with the terrorist. Despite her growing relationship with Andrew Dowling, Donna feels stifled in her efforts for the oil lobby. Bobby takes temporary charge of Ewing Oil, but it's J.R. who's doing the dirty work through April Stevens. Ray attempts to explain to Charlie why he has to stay away from her and Jenna. Pam and Cliff lock horns over her loyalties. Everyone at Southfork receives numbing news from California: Jamie is dead.
243	21	"A Death in the Family"	Michael Preece	Mitchell Wayne Katzman	February 20, 1987	March 18, 1987	175120	19.5/30
J.R. and April continue their quiet search for Jack. Sue Ellen shuts down her Los Angeles lingerie operation but finds a new "Valentine Girl" for the Dallas store. Christopher and John Ross play a potentially deadly game. Ray considers playing dirty in his divorce suit with Donna. Sue Ellen and J.R. renew their love for each other.
244	22	"Revenge of the Nerd"	Linda Gray	Calvin Clements, Jr.	February 27, 1987	March 25, 1987	175121	19.6/30
Jamie's death in a cliff fall leaves her husband holding a percentage of Ewing Oil. Furious at Cliff's disturbing news, J.R. divides the Southfork house by accusing Pam of scheming with her brother to ruin Ewing Oil. Sue Ellen offers an interesting solution to Pam's predicament. April desperately seeks comfort from the men in her life. Ray arrives at a painful resolution in his custody battle with Donna over their unborn child. Miss Ellie explodes over the strife at Southfork. B.D. Calhoun continues to plague J.R.
245	23	"The Ten Percent Solution"	Michael Preece	Susan Howard Chrane	March 13, 1987	April 1, 1987	175122	18.6/30
J.R. deviously schemes to frame Cliff for Jamie's death. While secretly maneuvering to secure the ten percent of Ewing Oil, J.R. also orchestrates a meeting between April and a friendly judge who may be helpful to their cause. Pam gets suspicious of Cliff's dealings with Jeremy Wendell. Cliff desperately attempts to raise money to back a Wendell loan. Donna brushes off the persistent Andrew Dowling. Nancy, an angry widow of a former Ewing employee plots revenge on the family.
246	24	"Some Good, Some Bad"	Larry Hagman	Louella Lee Caraway	March 20, 1987	April 8, 1987	175123	19.2/31
Jack Ewing comes to Bobby and J.R.'s aid in their quest for the ten percent of Ewing Oil. Jeremy Wendell reveals Cliff's underhanded business dealings to Pam, but not before both she and Bobby come to her brother's defense for allegedly murdering Jamie. Bobby, attempting to clear the air between him and Ray, gets a shock when he visits Ray's house. J.R. asks a wary Sue Ellen to move back in to their bedroom. Ray and Jenna reach an understanding.
247	25	"War and Peace"	Dwight Adair	Leah Markus	April 3, 1987	April 15, 1987	175124	20.0/32
Pam moves out of her office at Barnes-Wentworth. The trial to determine the fate of the ten percent of Ewing Oil is held and the judge delivers an unexpected verdict. With business lagging at Valentine Lingerie, Sue Ellen realizes she may need to get Mandy back modelling for the company. Nancy goes to a local newspaper with the story about the Ewings' involvement with terrorists, but they need proof before running the story. Donna has a baby girl and she calls her Margaret
248	26	"Ruthless People"	Patrick Duffy	Mitchell Wayne Katzman	April 10, 1987	April 22, 1987	175125	18.6/32
Double-crossed by J.R. and April, Jeremy Wendell vows revenge on Ewing Oil and he may have found it in a small Texas newspaper. A banner headline implicating J.R. in terrorism activities not only provides Wendell with ammunition, but outrages Miss Ellie and the rest of the Ewings. Mandy returns to be Sue Ellen's "Valentine Lingerie" girl but she has designs on doing much more. Ray goes to Washington, D.C., to see his daughter and reaches an understanding with Donna and Andrew Dowling. An expectant Jenna ponders her living situation.
249	27	"The Dark at the End of the Tunnel"	Larry Hagman	Calvin Clements, Jr.	May 1, 1987	May 6, 1987	175126	18.8/32
Tired of J.R.'s underhanded business tactics, Bobby, Ray and Miss Ellie "sell out" their shares of Ewing Oil to J.R. News from Washington hurls the Southfork family members into angry turmoil. Sue Ellen cautiously hatches a plot to test J.R.'s supposed loyalty. Pam finally confronts Jenna and informs her a new time is coming. A very wealthy April Stevens reciprocates on past feelings of humiliation.
250	28	"Two-Fifty"	Michael Preece	Leonard Katzman	May 8, 1987	May 13, 1987	175127	18.3/32
Miss Ellie is distraught over the fate of both Clayton and Ewing Oil. J.R. desperately scrambles to defend himself and the company against the justice department charges. Jeremy Wendell continues to coerce Alfred and Mrs. Scottfield into cooperating against the Ewings. Mandy reveals the true reason for her return to Dallas. Bobby unexpectedly bumps into a very expectant Jenna. Andrew Dowling agrees to help Bobby investigate the chances of saving Ewing Oil. Pam attempts to serve warning to Cliff about the impending demise of Ewing Oil, but he is wary of her loyalties.
251	29	"Fall of the House of Ewing"	Leonard Katzman	David Paulsen	May 15, 1987	May 20, 1987	175128	29.5/37
Jenna gives birth to a baby boy she calls Lucas; Christopher learns of his adoption; J.R. and Bobby continue negotiations with the Justice Department; Mrs. Scottfield and Jeremy Wendell reveal their plans; Sue Ellen and Mandy fight over J.R. J.R. loses Ewing Oil when the Justice Department shuts the company down. Pam receives wonderful medical news, and races to get home to tell Bobby, but crashes her car into a fuel truck which explodes in a fiery finale.

=== Season 11 (1987–88) ===
No. overall	No. in season	Title	Directed by	Written by	Original U.S. air date	Original U.K. air date	Prod. code	Rating/share (households)
252	1	"After the Fall: Ewing Rise"	Leonard Katzman	Arthur Bernard Lewis	September 25, 1987	December 2, 1987	176101	16.9/31
Pam is rushed to the hospital with third-degree burns, leaving Bobby grief-stricken; J.R. starts JRE Industries; Jenna enjoys her new baby Lucas and Ray buys a family car. Cliff worries he's let down the memory of Digger.
253	2	"After the Fall: Digger Redux"	Michael Preece	David Paulsen	September 25, 1987	December 9, 1987	176102	16.9/31
Cliff meets Dandy Dandridge, who reminds him of Digger; J.R. obtains Pam's will to plan in case she dies, while April lends Bobby her support; Sue Ellen is approached with help for her business; Miss Ellie feels Clayton is overexerting himself.
254	3	"The Son Also Rises"	Leonard Katzman	Leah Markus	October 2, 1987	December 16, 1987	176103	17.0/30
Desperate to see his mother, Christopher runs away; Charlie wants Jenna and Ray to marry; J.R. meets Casey Denault, a potential business partner; Clayton continues to quarrel with Miss Ellie about his activity level.
255	4	"Gone with the Wind"	Michael Preece	Mitchell Wayne Katzman	October 9, 1987	December 23, 1987	176104	20.2/35
Ray pressures Jenna to allow Bobby to be a part of Lucas's life; J.R. uses Casey to help him rebuild his company; Nicholas tells Sue Ellen that she needs to expand Valentine Lingerie nationally in order for the company to be successful and the two of them travel to L.A. to look at office space; tired of watching Clayton endanger his health, Miss Ellie asks him to leave Southfork; Pam's bandages are removed.
256	5	"The Lady Vanishes"	Leonard Katzman	Leonard Katzman	October 16, 1987	December 30, 1987	176105	17.7/30
Bobby arrives at the hospital to find that Pam has disappeared; Bobby suspects Katherine may have kidnapped Pam and he and Cliff hire a private investigator to find her; Serena, a former madam and mistress of J.R.'s, comes to Dallas to ask for J.R.'s help for a friend of hers named Walter Hicks, Hicks owns a drilling equipment company and has a 5 million dollar loan due soon for 20 million dollars of inventory he can't sell due to a lull in drilling; in L.A., Nicholas tries convinces Sue Ellen to buy Secret Hours, a lingerie company with coast-to-coast distribution.
257	6	"Tough Love"	Michael Preece	Arthur Bernard Lewis	October 23, 1987	January 6, 1988	176106	18.2/31
The news that Pam has left devastates both Bobby and Cliff; J.R. secretly takes over Walter's loan from the bank and then forecloses on the loan, cheaply acquiring the inventory; after being left by Walter, Serena is nearly forced back into prostitution until J.R. hires her to dig up dirt on Wilson Cryder, the new head of WestStar; Dandy tells Cliff he owns some land which he believes is loaded with oil; Sue Ellen doesn't have enough money to successfully expand her company, so Nicholas finds her a potential partner; a mysterious blond woman takes an interest in Bobby and Christopher.
258	7	"Last Tango in Dallas"	Jerry Jameson	David Paulsen	October 30, 1987	January 13, 1988	176107	16.9/28
With Pam gone, Charlie is concerned that Jenna will leave Ray for Bobby; the mysterious blond woman introduces herself to Bobby and Christopher as Lisa Alden and tells them that she recently moved to Dallas; Sue Ellen decides not to partner with April and buys Secret Hours on her own; Dandy tells Cliff his land has been tested before with poor results, but Dandy convinces Cliff to go ahead with drilling anyway; Pam sends Bobby a Power of Attorney document giving him control of her Wentworth stock; J.R. learns of the POA document from the PI he hired to find Pam; At the Oil Barons Ball Ray has a question for Jenna; Clayton has chest pains.
259	8	"Mummy's Revenge"	Michael Preece	Mitchell Wayne Katzman	November 6, 1987	January 20, 1988	176108	17.3/29
Cliff discovers that Dandy owes years of back-taxes on his land and pays it off acquiring the deed; after hearing that Jenna turned down Ray's proposal, Charlie believes that it's because she is still in love with Bobby and Ray leaves to go Washington to see his daughter; Clayton has an angioplasty; Casey has his hands full with an overly amorous Marilee Stone; Lisa continues to try to get closer to Bobby and Christopher; J.R. has upsetting news for Bobby.April is bored she does not know what to do with all the money she has now.
260	9	"Hustling"	Jerry Jameson	Leah Markus	November 13, 1987	January 27, 1988	176109	17.3/29
Cliff continues to sink money into drilling on Dandy's land with no results; J.R. arranges an 'accidental' meeting with Kimberly Cryder, wife of Wilson Cryder; Bobby signs Pam's divorce papers; Casey dreams of one day making big deals for himself and not other people; while speaking with April, Nicholas is approached by a man who believes Nicholas is Joseph Lombardi from Bensonhurst, Nicholas denies this, but later, an intrigued April hires a PI to investigate Joseph Lombardi.Jenna asks Ray to marry her.
261	10	"Bedtime Stories"	Michael Preece	Leonard Katzman	November 20, 1987	February 3, 1988	176110	15.7/25
Bobby decides on a name for his company, Petro Group Dallas; Ray and Jenna announce their engagement; Nicholas is upset that J.R. went to his boss about the way Nicholas is handling Sue Ellen's account; Bobby tells Lisa that he and Christopher need to stop seeing her because Bobby is concerned Christopher is getting too attached to Lisa so soon after Pam leaving; Nicholas calls his father to warn him that someone from the old neighborhood may have recognized him in Dallas; J.R. approaches Bobby with a plan to destroy WestStar Oil; the reason for Lisa's interest in Bobby and Christopher is revealed; J.R. continues to seduce Kimberly Cryder, but she may not be quite the pawn he had imagined.
262	11	"Lovers and Other Liars"	Jerry Jameson	Arthur Bernard Lewis	November 27, 1987	February 10, 1988	176111	15.7/27
Dandy is upset that Cliff has stopped drilling on his land and later, at gunpoint, forces the crew back to work; J.R. urges April to secretly and slowly buy WestStar stock; Lisa disobeys Bobby's wishes and arranges to meet Christopher; Sue Ellen spies J.R. up to old tricks again; J.R. learns that the largest shareholder of WestStar stock is Dr. Herbert Styles and that he has an unexpected connection to Kimberly.
263	12	"Brothers and Sons"	Michael Preece	David Paulsen	December 4, 1987	February 17, 1988	176112	16.7/28
The land in east Texas may not contain oil, but it does have a lot of natural gas; Bobby rediscovers his passion for the oil business; Jenna isn't happy with Ray's choice for his best man; J.R. tells Casey about a company he wants Casey to acquire for JRE, but Casey considers buying the company for himself; April continues to dig into Nicholas' past; Ray and Jenna's wedding day arrives; Christopher learns he has a new half-brother; Sue Ellen meets Kimberly; Lisa shows up at the Ewing barbecue with legal papers for Bobby.
264	13	"Brother, Can You Spare a Child?"	Patrick Duffy	Leah Markus	December 11, 1987	February 24, 1988	176113	15.9/27
Nicholas comforts April when she is upset over not being invited the annual Ewing barbecue; Miss Ellie becomes involved in a project for the DOA, leaving Clayton feeling bored; Cliff talks to Miss Ellie about the history between the Barnes and the Ewings; Christopher feels that Bobby doesn't want him anymore, now that he has a biological son; Sue Ellen arranges a dinner date with herself and J.R. and Kimberly and Wilson Cryder; Casey swindles J.R. by buying Brinker Oil for the cartel he has formed and lies to J.R. about not being able to acquire the company for JRE; Lisa threatens to reveal that Bobby bought Christopher from her brother, then confesses feeling guilty to a surprising partner.
265	14	"Daddy's Little Darlin"	Larry Hagman	Mitchell Wayne Katzman	December 18, 1987	March 2, 1988	176114	14.7/25
Bobby warns Sue Ellen that his custody suit could rehash a lot of old Ewing dirty laundry; J.R. inadvertently learns from one of Casey's cartel members that Casey cheated him out of Brinker Oil and then sets Casey up to buy a worthless piece of property from him; Cliff tries to buy off Lisa; Clayton is intrigued by a portrait he sees at a gallery; Bobby asks April out to dinner; J.R. meets Dr. Herbert Styles who makes him an interesting proposal.
266	15	"It's Me Again"	Leonard Katzman	Leonard Katzman	January 8, 1988	March 9, 1988	176115	17.6/28
J.R. tells Kimberly that he will divorce Sue Ellen and marry her, but she has to divorce Wilson first; Nicholas tells Sue Ellen that he is withdrawing from her account; at J.R. request, Lisa makes friends with Cliff and learns that a farmer will not give Cliff the Right Of Way across his land to attach Cliff's natural gas pipeline to the main line meaning Cliff can't sell his natural gas; Jenna tells Bobby that she still loves him; the man that recognized Nicholas returns to April's restaurant and she questions him about Joseph Lombardi; Clayton meets Laurel Ellis, the woman in the painting he purchased; Ray catches Charlie in the barn with her boyfriend Randy (Brad Pitt); with Sly's help, J.R. buys the farmland Cliff needs.
267	16	"Marriage on the Rocks"	Larry Hagman	Arthur Bernard Lewis	January 15, 1988	March 16, 1988	176116	16.8/27
Ray wants to be a father to Charlie, but she's not interested; J.R. goes to Cliff with a proposal to bring down WestStar; Nicholas tells Sue Ellen that J.R. has had both April and Sly buying WestStar stock; after hearing that Kimberly has started divorce proceedings against Wilson, J.R. talks to a lawyer about his chances for custody of John Ross should he divorce Sue Ellen; Bobby feels betrayed when he sees Cliff having dinner with Lisa; J.R. gives Nicholas his permission to have an affair with Sue Ellen.
268	17	"Anniversary Waltz"	David Paulsen	David Paulsen	January 22, 1988	March 23, 1988	176117	17.2/28
J.R. forgives Casey for his betrayal; Nicholas tells Sue Ellen that he doesn't want her to be with him only to get revenge against J.R.; Cliff agrees to J.R.'s proposal and signs over to J.R. the voting rights for the WestStar stock he has bought in return for the Right Of Way over the farmland J.R. purchased; while Miss Ellie works on her DOA project, Clayton continues to spend time with Laurel; Jenna gets upset with Charlie and slaps her; Bobby realizes the truth about J.R.'s involvement with Lisa.
269	18	"Brotherly Love"	Linda Gray	Leah Markus	February 5, 1988	March 30, 1988	176118	18.6/30
Bobby learns that he may be able to get the Ewing Oil name back again; J.R. tells Lisa that he doesn't need her anymore and to leave Dallas; Casey asks Sly out for a date; when Cliff gets his natural gas pipeline hooked up he wants to celebrate, but instead he finds out how empty his life really is; Kimberly is getting tired of waiting for J.R. to leave Sue Ellen.
270	19	"The Best Laid Plans"	Patrick Duffy	Mitchell Wayne Katzman	February 12, 1988	April 6, 1988	176119	17.5/29
Laurel tells Clayton that he should get back to the man he used to be; Sue Ellen questions Nicholas about J.R.'s ability to take control of WestStar; April is concerned Bobby won't want to see her if he found out about her past relationship with J.R.; Sue Ellen joins forces with Bobby to ensure J.R. never gets Ewing Oil back; J.R. sets Sue Ellen up to catch him with Kimberly; Miss Ellie sees something upsetting; Charlie asks for Bobby's help in dealing with Ray and Jenna, but Ray resents Bobby's interference.
271	20	"Farlow's Follies"	Steve Kanaly	Louella Lee Caraway	February 19, 1988	April 13, 1988	176120	17.1/27
Ray, Jenna and Charlie agree to put aside their recent difficulties; Clayton decides to go back to work; Sue Ellen's unwillingness to give J.R. a divorce is putting his plan to take over WestStar in jeopardy; Bobby travels to Washington to see about getting back the Ewing Oil name and meets Kay Lloyd, one of Senator Dowling's staff members; Miss Ellie spies Clayton with Laurel again and believes he is having an affair; April reveals a secret to Bobby.
272	21	"Malice in Dallas"	Larry Hagman	Arthur Bernard Lewis	February 26, 1988	April 20, 1988	176121	16.6/27
Lisa returns to Dallas and renews the custody fight for Christopher; Charlie is skipping school and failing her classes, so Jenna and Ray consider sending her away to boarding school; Clayton isn't having an affair, but more suspicious circumstances convince Miss Ellie that her marriage is in serious trouble and she tells Mavis about her fears about Clayton; April warns Nicholas that there may be people after him and he visits his parents to tell them that they may have been found out; Kimberly is afraid J.R. won't marry her if he can control of WestStar without her and takes steps to ensure that can't happen; a verdict is rendered in the custody trial.
273	22	"Crime Story"	Patrick Duffy	David Paulsen	March 4, 1988	April 27, 1988	176122	16.3/27
Lisa goes to Southfork to say goodbye to Christopher; Casey informs J.R. about his meeting with Kimberley; Sue Ellen tells J.R. that she knows exactly what he's been up to; April is frightened when the men looking for Nicholas contact her; Laurel's friend David tries to blackmail Clayton for $50,000 to keep his silence regarding Clayton's alleged affair with Laurel; Bobby continues to get closer to Kay and later tells April that he doesn't think that their relationship should go any further.
274	23	"To Have and to Hold"	Larry Hagman	Leah Markus	March 11, 1988	May 4, 1988	176123	15.3/26
Two men come April's apartment to 'talk' to her about Joey Lombardi and she tells them that Joey Lombardi is now Nicholas Pearce and where to find him; because of J.R. the price of WestStar stock is dropping and J.R. asks Ray buy some stock to help him take control of the company, but Ray refuses; Ray and Jenna tell Charlie that they want to send her to a Swiss boarding school and she is not happy about it; the mob men are looking for Nicholas' father and Nicholas sets up a ruse to make them believe his parents are dead; Casey opens up to Sly about his father's business dealings with J.R. and his own ambitions; Miss Ellie finally reveals to Clayton her suspicion that he is having an affair.
275	24	"Dead Reckoning"	David Paulsen	Mitchell Wayne Katzman	March 18, 1988	May 11, 1988	176124	14.6/24
Despite Clayton's vow that he is not having an affair, Miss Ellie tells him that she cannot trust him and asks him to leave Southfork; Jenna decides to accompany Charlie to Switzerland to help her adjust to her new boarding school; Cliff is becoming more and more agitated over all of the money he is losing due to the drop in the price of the WestStar stock J.R. made him buy and he begins to take tranquilizers to help him sleep; an enraged Clayton assaults David after hearing that David lied to Miss Ellie about Clayton having an affair with Laurel; Casey is becoming increasingly tired of working for J.R., but he lacks the money or the connections to really make it big.
276	25	"Never Say Never"	Cliff Fenneman	Leonard Katzman	April 1, 1988	May 18, 1988	176125	16.2/28
David is dead and Clayton is arrested for murder; Miss Ellie stands by Clayton, but lets him know it's mostly for appearances; with Jenna and Charlie in Switzerland, Ray is feeling lonely in his big empty house, until he meets Connie; Casey goes to Cliff and tells him that they have a lot in common because the way Jock treated Digger is exactly the way J.R. treated Casey's father; Cliff begins to overuse the tranquilizers; Bobby is upset when a senator he meets in Washington asks for a bribe in return for his help to get the right to use the Ewing name back for Bobby; concerned about the added stress the fight for WestStar is putting on the already frail health of her father, Kimberly goes to J.R. and informs him that she will convince her father to back J.R., however, J.R. is not interested in a truce, he wants a total surrender.
277	26	"Last of the Good Guys"	Michael Preece	Arthur Bernard Lewis	April 8, 1988	May 25, 1988	176126	16.2/28
Clayton informs Miss Ellie that he doesn't want to continue living at Southfork if it's just for show, but Miss Ellie doesn't want Clayton to leave, she just needs more time; J.R. sets his sights on Laurel; Ray sleeps with Connie, but immediately regrets it; Sue Ellen asks Nicholas to buy her a large amount of WestStar stock; Casey realizes that J.R. will never let him out from under his thumb, so he tries to make a business deal with Cliff; J.R. gets proof that Clayton didn't kill David and he's willing to use it, for a price; Kimberly is surprised to get Sue Ellen's support in the battle for WestStar, but the fight may cost Kimberly something more dear to her.
278	27	"Top Gun"	Michael Preece	David Paulsen	April 15, 1988	June 1, 1988	176127	16.8/30
Cliff's abuse of tranquilizers is becoming more and more apparent; Bobby is told that he will never get back the Ewing Oil name; Kimberly blames J.R. for her father's death; Nicholas finally confides in Sue Ellen about his past; Connie is not willing to let go of Ray; Bobby is having a difficult time accepting the demands of Kay's career; Clayton is disgusted to learn that J.R. blackmailed Laurel into bed in return for getting the murder charges dropped. The shareholders at WestStar elect a new Chairman of the Board and J.R. expects to be elected, using the voting rights from April, Cliff and Sly, but is stunned when Sue Ellen arrives at the meeting as a secret shareholder and votes against J.R., preventing him from taking over WestStar.
279	28	"Pillow Talk"	Dwight Adair	Leah Markus	April 29, 1988	June 8, 1988	176128	15.6/27
J.R. is furious with Sue Ellen for siding with Kimberly and voting Jeremy Wendell back as Chairman of WestStar; Sue Ellen leaves Southfork, but J.R. prevents her from taking John Ross; Ray orders a very unstable Connie to stay away from him; J.R. informs Casey that he no longer needs his services; Miss Ellie wants Clayton to be co-owner of Southfork.
280	29	"Things Ain't Goin' Too Good at Southfork, Again"	Linda Gray	Mitchell Wayne Katzman	May 6, 1988	June 15, 1988	176129	15.6/28
A psychotic Connie tries to stab Ray; Jenna is frightened at what she finds when she returns home from Europe; Cliff informs J.R. that he has sold his natural gas field and his WestStar stock to Jeremy Wendell; Miss Ellie is angry with J.R. for keeping John Ross away from Sue Ellen; Bobby gets the right to use the Ewing Oil name; J.R. is furious after learning that Clayton is now co-owner of Southfork and leaves the ranch; Cliff agrees to give Casey a chance; Bobby and Kay decide to end their relationship because neither is willing to give up their career and move; Lucy returns home.
281	30	"The Fat Lady Singeth"	Leonard Katzman	Leonard Katzman	May 13, 1988	June 22, 1988	176130	17.3/30
Lucy takes a liking to Casey after he tells her that he hates J.R.; J.R. blackmails Jeremy Wendell and re-acquires the former Ewing Oil assets from WestStar; Jordan Lee tells Cliff that he saw Pam; Jenna forgives Ray and they decide to leave Dallas; a confrontation over John Ross between Nicholas, Sue Ellen and J.R. has a tragic ending. During the fight, J.R. throws Nicholas over the balcony and Sue Ellen retaliates by shooting J.R.

=== Season 12 (1988–89) ===
No. overall	No. in season	Title	Directed by	Written by	Original U.S. air date	Original U.K. air date	Prod. code	U.S. viewers (millions)
282	1	"Carousel"	Michael Preece	Leonard Katzman	October 28, 1988	January 4, 1989	177101	25.3
Sue Ellen is disappointed to learn that J.R. isn't dead; Cliff is overjoyed at the thought of seeing Pam again, until she makes it clear to him that she wants nothing to do with any part of her former life in Dallas; J.R. tries to make his condition appear worse than it is in order to manipulate Bobby into partnering with him; Lucy inadvertently finds out where John Ross is and reunites him with Sue Ellen; a drought in Dallas is threatening the cattle herd at Southfork; Cliff lies to Bobby about seeing Pam; Carter McKay arrives in Dallas and is interested in buying Ray's house; Bobby agrees to a conditional partnership with J.R.
283	2	"No Greater Love"	Russ Mayberry	Simon Masters	November 4, 1988	January 11, 1989	177102	23.1
John Ross asks Sue Ellen why she shot his dad; upon learning that it will increase his chances of getting full custody of John Ross, J.R. moves back into Southfork; both Clayton and Cliff make appealing business proposals to Bobby; John Ross isn't very happy living in Sue Ellen's new house and it doesn't go unnoticed by Sue Ellen; Mitch arrives at Southfork to work things out with Lucy, but it doesn't go well; After she sees Bobby with another woman, April is jealous and blurts out the truth about Cliff's meeting with Pam; Carter McKay moves into the Krebbs' place; Sue Ellen agrees to let John Ross live at Southfork, but only if J.R. signs over full custody to her.
284	3	"The Call of the Wild"	Michael Preece	Jonathan Hales	November 11, 1988	January 18, 1989	177103	20.4
The drought continues; Sue Ellen is determined to get back at J.R.; Casey returns to Dallas, ecstatic, after having struck oil on the 'worthless' dust field J.R. gave to his father; stung over Pam's rejection, a depressed Cliff is intent on getting out of the oil business; while on a hunting trip with Bobby and the boys, J.R. meets and becomes infatuated with Cally Harper.
285	4	"Out of the Frying Pan"	Russ Mayberry	Mitchell Wayne Katzman	November 18, 1988	January 25, 1989	177104	21.6
Cliff sells Barnes-Wentworth Oil to Jeremy Wendell; Casey romances Lucy; Miss Ellie suggests that Bobby ask Cliff to be a partner in Ewing Oil; Cally's brothers catch her in bed with J.R.; Bobby tries to apologize to April, but she's too hurt by his rejection to accept; Sue Ellen is frustrated to learn that J.R. hasn't been spending much time with John Ross; J.R. is charged and convicted of rape and sent to a backwoods penal camp.
286	5	"Road Work"	Michael Preece	Arthur Bernard Lewis	December 2, 1988	February 1, 1989	177105	22.3
Believing it to be due to a woman, the Ewings aren't very concerned about J.R.'s prolonged absence; Sue Ellen teams up with Jeremy Wendell against J.R.; Cliff agrees to join Ewing Oil and he and Bobby go to a pool hall to celebrate, while there Bobby meets Tracey Lawton, who is hustling another one of the patrons; Casey's relationship with Lucy isn't progressing as quickly as he'd like; Clayton is infuriated after discovering that Carter McKay has dammed his part of the river that runs through Southfork, leaving the cattle on Southfork with no water; J.R. repeatedly tries to find a way out of the penal camp, but he only ends up worse off than before.
287	6	"War and Love and the Whole Damned Thing"	Russ Mayberry	Leonard Katzman	December 9, 1988	February 8, 1989	177106	21.8
Ray returns to Southfork; the Ewings blow up Carter McKay's dam; Sue Ellen and Jeremy Wendell plot J.R.'s downfall, but she has to sell her WestStar stock to Jeremy in order to raise the necessary funds; tensions continue to mount between the Ewings and Carter McKay; Sue Ellen's divorce from J.R. becomes final; Bobby runs into Tracey Lawton again; Lucy asks Casey to be patient with her need to take their relationship slow; Cliff officially joins Ewing Oil; after the guard J.R. bribed to release him turns him over to Cally's brothers, J.R. is forced to make a choice he may later regret.
288	7	"Showdown at the Ewing Corral"	Michael Preece	Mitchell Wayne Katzman	December 16, 1988	February 15, 1989	177107	20.8
Jeremy lets Sue Ellen know that he is interested in having more than just a business relationship with her; J.R. is able to escape from the Harpers and return to Dallas; Carter has his ranch foreman, Hughes, try to threaten and then bribe the Southfork ranch hands into leaving; Tracey tells Bobby about her previous marriage; Cliff gleefully tells J.R. that he is now a partner in Ewing Oil; Carter is shocked to see Tracey with Bobby; Miss Ellie stands up to Carter when he tells her that she will have to sell a piece of Southfork to him in order to make the trouble between them go away. NOTE: The trailer for this episode, featured at the end of the previous episode, features a scene with J.R. attempting to flee the Harper house and being confronted by an angry Rottweiler. However, no such scene appears.
289	8	"Deception"	Irving J. Moore	Arthur Bernard Lewis	January 6, 1989	February 22, 1989	445008	22.6
Jeremy advises Sue Ellen to use whatever she has to, including John Ross, to get revenge on J.R.; the Ewings learn that the Southfork land that Carter McKay wants to buy is Section 40, the area that has large oil deposits; Casey convinces Lucy to invest in his company Denault Inc., he then transfers most of that money to his other company with April; April learns from J.R. that Casey's oil strike in Oklahoma was nowhere near as big as he told her; Carter is rattled when he discovers the man Tracey is seeing is Bobby Ewing; the connection between Carter and Tracey is revealed.
290	9	"Counter Attack"	Michael Preece	Leonard Katzman	January 13, 1989	March 1, 1989	445009	20.9
J.R. has nightmares over his recent ordeal with the Harpers; knowing that Casey doesn't have the funds to do it, April talks to him about each of them investing more money into their company; not wanting her revenge on J.R. to extend to the rest of the Ewings, Sue Ellen ends her association with Jeremy Wendell; after Christopher ends up in the middle of a gunfight between Bobby, Ray and McKay's men, the Ewings go on the attack; Bobby is shocked to learn that Tracey's father is Carter McKay.
291	10	"The Sting"	Irving J. Moore	Mitchell Wayne Katzman	January 20, 1989	March 8, 1989	445010	23.2
Hoping to end all of the fighting, Miss Ellie agrees to sell Section 40 to Carter McKay; Carter refuses to sign Section 40 over to Jeremy Wendell until he lives up to his end of their deal; after April and Lucy expose Casey's lies concerning his oil strike, J.R. offers to be a silent partner with April in a new oil company; Cliff begins dating Tammy Miller; Ray says goodbye to Southfork and the Ewings; in order to raise the money to buy Section 40, Jeremy must sell all of his WestStar stock; while Carter gets a visit from an old friend, J.R. gets one from someone he hoped to never see again.
292	11	"The Two Mrs. Ewings"	Michael Preece	Arthur Bernard Lewis	January 27, 1989	March 15, 1989	445011	23.3
Cally is desperate to have J.R. accept her as his wife; a visit from Bruce Harvey, the movie producer Sue Ellen used to lure Mandy Winger out of Dallas, starts Sue Ellen thinking about buying a movie studio; John Ross doesn't like having a new step-mother; J.R. overhears Cliff tell Bobby about a very lucrative deal, then J.R. gets April to purchase it for their company; Sue Ellen meets the new Mrs. J.R. Ewing; with Jeremy Wendell arrested, Carter McKay is announced as the new Chairman of WestStar.
293	12	"The Switch"	Irving J. Moore	Leonard Katzman	February 3, 1989	March 22, 1989	445012	23.5
Cally makes a friend at Southfork; due to her feelings for Bobby, Tammy and Cliff end their relationship; Tracey agrees to work for her father at WestStar; an unexpected source gives Cally advice on how to get J.R.'s attention; John Ross threatens Cally with forcing J.R. to make a choice between the two of them; J.R. gets word that Nicholas' mob-connected father is looking into his son's death.
294	13	"He-e-ere's Papa!"	Patrick Duffy	Louella Lee Caraway	February 10, 1989	March 29, 1989	445013	22.3
Carter has Tracey learn all she can about the history of WestStar Oil; J.R. has a long talk with Joseph Lombardi concerning the events that lead to Nicholas' death; John Ross believes that Cally is standing in the way of his parents getting back together; Cliff talks to Bobby about selling some old Ewing Oil properties, but those properties are controlled by J.R.; Sue Ellen has the opportunity to get rid of J.R. once and for all.
295	14	"Comings and Goings"	Larry Hagman	Mitchell Wayne Katzman	February 17, 1989	April 5, 1989	445014	22.9
Sue Ellen is introduced to Don Lockwood, the man that is to write and direct the uncomplimentary movie she wants to make about J.R., she then enlists Lucy's help in providing material for the movie; Carter's recently detoxed son, Tommy, arrives in Dallas, but he may not be as clean as he claims to be; J.R. is willing to make Cliff's profitable deal and sell the properties he controls, but only if Bobby agrees to allow J.R. back into the oil side of Ewing Oil; Cally rescues John Ross after he almost drowns in the pool;
296	15	"Country Girl"	Patrick Duffy	Arthur Bernard Lewis	February 24, 1989	April 12, 1989	445015	25.9
J.R. plans to double-cross Bobby and Cliff concerning the sale of the Ewing properties; Carter finds drugs hidden in Tommy's bedroom; Cally is finally making progress in getting John Ross to like her; Miss Ellie demands J.R. either accept Cally as his wife or divorce her; Tracey is worried about her brother after April catches Tommy's eye; Bobby is suspicious of Tommy's behaviour; Sue Ellen gives Don her diaries to read to help him in writing the movie; Cally tells J.R. that she is having his child.
297	16	"Wedding Belle Blues"	Larry Hagman	Howard Lakin	February 24, 1989	April 19, 1989	445016	25.9
With storm clouds overhead, J.R. and Cally get married; Sue Ellen asks Don to escort her to the wedding so that he can get a feel for Southfork; Cliff gets evidence that J.R. is attempting to sell the Ewing properties to another company, but he doesn't know that J.R. and April own that company; a violent storm forces Sue Ellen, Don, Cliff, April and the McKays to seek refuge at Southfork for the night; April is unsettled by Tommy's actions; when Cally tells J.R. that she lied about being pregnant, J.R. realizes she may be a more fitting Ewing bride than he believed.
298	17	"The Way We Were"	Patrick Duffy	Louella Lee Caraway	March 3, 1989	April 26, 1989	445017	23.0
Tommy receives a shipment of cocaine from South America, then when Tommy can't get an import license due to his criminal record, Tracey agrees to get the license for him, not knowing that he plans to use it to import drugs; April tells Bobby that she wants them to be friends again, even if they are rivals in the oil business; Tommy admits to J.R. that he blames Carter for his mother's death; Don kisses Sue Ellen after she tells him about a painful part of her past.
299	18	"The Serpent's Tooth"	Larry Hagman	Story by : Mitchell Wayne Katzman; Teleplay by : Arthur Bernard Lewis & Howard Lakin	March 10, 1989	May 3, 1989	445018	19.4
Needing more money for his 'business', Tommy offers to sell information about an important European deal Carter is working on for WestStar to J.R.; Christopher feels left out now that John Ross has accepted Cally as his step-mother; Sue Ellen and Don have an argument over the script for the movie; with his relationship with Tracey having reached a standstill, Bobby starts spending more time with his new friend April; J.R. thinks that he finally has what he needs to get Bobby to allow him back completely into Ewing Oil.
300	19	"Three Hundred"	Patrick Duffy	Leonard Katzman	March 17, 1989	May 10, 1989	445019	19.0
Bobby catches J.R. poking his nose into the company's oil business, then after he confronts J.R., the two of them get trapped in the elevator at Ewing Oil; Sue Ellen begins to wonder if hurting J.R. is worth possibly hurting the rest of the Ewing family; Tommy apologizes to April for his behaviour at Southfork the night of J.R. and Cally's wedding, but later he gets angry with her when she again rejects his overly aggressive advances; stuck in the elevator all night, Bobby and J.R. have a long talk about Ewing Oil, J.R. tells Bobby about WestStar's European deal and Bobby agrees to make J.R. a full partner in Ewing Oil.
301	20	"April Showers"	Irving J. Moore	Howard Lakin	March 31, 1989	May 17, 1989	445020	20.5
Cliff doesn't react well when Bobby tells him that he has decided to make J.R. a full partner at Ewing Oil, that is until he hears about the European deal; Sue Ellen and Don go to L.A. to cast roles for the movie; Cally is determined to improve herself believing that it will make her a more suitable wife for J.R.; Bobby and Tracey realize their relationship isn't moving forward and call it quits; desperate for more money and high on cocaine, Tommy trashes April's apartment and assaults her; Bobby attacks Tommy; Carter vows revenge on Bobby for hurting both of his children.
302	21	"And Away We Go!"	Steve Kanaly	Arthur Bernard Lewis	April 7, 1989	May 24, 1989	445021	20.4
Fearful of both the police and his South American drug suppliers, Tommy flees Dallas; J.R. continues with his plan to manipulate Ewing Oil into the European deal; Tracey tells Bobby she's leaving Dallas to try to find Tommy; Cliff is pleasantly surprised to find that his ex-girlfriend Afton Cooper has returned to Dallas, but she's worried that Cliff is still the same work-obsessed man he was when she left; Bobby, J.R. and Cally leave for Europe to complete the deal for Ewing Oil.
303	22	"Yellow Brick Road"	Cliff Fenneman	Leonard Katzman	April 14, 1989	May 31, 1989	445022	20.8
Bobby, J.R., and Cally arrive in Salzburg, Austria where they are befriended by an American couple secretly working for Carter McKay; Don gives Sue Ellen a finished copy of the manuscript for her movie; Miss Ellie is worried when Clayton doesn't return after leaving Southfork early in the morning; Bobby receives a mysterious letter requesting a meeting with him and is surprised to see who it is from; Miss Ellie is alarmed to hear that Clayton was thrown from his horse and, as a result, he has partial amnesia and doesn't remember her; Cliff is shocked when he goes to visit Afton, but instead meets her daughter, Pamela Rebecca Cooper; J.R. and Bobby meet with the head of the European consortium, however, the offer he gives them may be more than they are willing to make.
304	23	"The Sound of Money"	Irving J. Moore	Arthur Bernard Lewis	April 28, 1989	June 7, 1989	445023	19.0
J.R. and Bobby reject Herr Brundin's offer to buy Ewing Oil and suspect Carter McKay was behind it, however, Brundin is still interested in making a deal the Ewings; J.R. is having a tough time keeping up with Cally's youthful energy; Afton is angry with Cliff for going to her home uninvited and is reluctant to talk about her daughter, but when Cliff insinuates that Pamela is his child by expressing concern that she may have the fatal genetic condition that runs in his family, Afton tells Cliff that he is not Pamela's father; Clayton doesn't remember the last 20 years of his life and has a hard time believing Miss Ellie when she tells him that he sold the Southern Cross Ranch; Sue Ellen considers telling Miss Ellie that she is making a movie about her marriage to J.R. after realizing that Miss Ellie may learn some rather disturbing secrets her son has kept from her; while in Vienna, J.R. runs into an old flame.
305	24	"The Great Texas Waltz"	Linda Gray	Howard Lakin	May 5, 1989	June 14, 1989	445024	19.0
J.R. tells Bobby that Vanessa Beaumont is the one woman that ever broke his heart; Carter asks April to talk Bobby out of going after the European deal saying that if the Ewings steal this deal from him it will lead to all out war; Cliff hires a private investigator to look into the birth of Afton's daughter; after a romantic evening at a Viennese ball, Bobby and April make love; Sue Ellen wants Don and John Ross to get to know each other, but John Ross isn't interested in having another step-parent; Clayton finds that every part of his life in San Angelo is gone; Vanessa warns J.R. that the European consortium is not as it appears and that J.R. and Bobby must to go to Moscow to find the answers they need.
306	25	"Mission to Moscow"	Michael Preece	Leonard Katzman	May 12, 1989	June 21, 1989	445025	18.8
In Moscow, J.R. and Bobby learn that the European consortium is merely a front for OPEC and decide to pull out of the deal rather than put their oil at the control of the Arabs; Miss Ellie begins to despair that Clayton will never remember their life together, but Clayton's memory returns after Miss Ellie suffers a minor accident; Cliff's private investigator gives him evidence which insinuates that Cliff is the father of Afton's daughter, but when Cliff goes to confront Afton with it he is told that she has left town; J.R. and Bobby try to warn Carter about dealing with the consortium; as production of the movie nears completion, Sue Ellen and Don have to deal with how that will affect their relationship.
307	26	"Reel Life"	Irving J. Moore	Arthur Bernard Lewis & Howard Lakin	May 19, 1989	June 28, 1989	445026	19.6
Having returned to Dallas with Bobby, J.R. and Cally, April begins receiving unsettling, anonymous phone calls which Bobby believes are from Tommy McKay; Cliff goes to Baton Rouge in an effort to track down Afton; with production of the movie completed, Don asks Sue Ellen to move to London with him; Miss Ellie receives a letter intended for Jock which contains a mysterious note and a key; Sue Ellen shows J.R. a rough cut of the movie which alarms him. She then informs him that she has no plans to release it unless J.R. ever steps out of line and does something to hurt her or John Ross. Knowing the film will truly ruin him, J.R. watches helplessly as his ex-wife leaves Dallas.

=== Season 13 (1989–90) ===
No. overall	No. in season	Title	Directed by	Written by	Original U.S. air date	Original U.K. air date	Prod. code	U.S. viewers (millions)
308	1	"Phantom of the Oil Rig"	Irving J. Moore	Howard Lakin	September 22, 1989	January 3, 1990	445601	18.2
Due to the European deal, WestStar's oil supply is spread too thin to meet the needs of their Texas based customers, so Bobby and J.R. attempt to make deals with these refineries for Ewing Oil, but they disagree about having to drop some of their old customers to get new ones; Miss Ellie and Clayton learn that the key likely fits a deposit box from a bank somewhere in New England; Cliff's obsession with finding Afton causes him to neglect his duties at Ewing Oil; Tommy returns to Dallas and denies making the phone calls to April; Tommy asks his father for forgiveness and Carter agrees to allow Tommy to work at WestStar, but Tommy's repentance isn't as real as it seems; April's sister Michelle comes to town; J.R. learns it may be more difficult to outmaneuver Carter McKay than he thought.
309	2	"The Leopard's Spots"	Michael Preece	Leonard Katzman	September 22, 1989	January 5, 1990	445602	18.2
Unaware that J.R. has already secretly made a deal with a refinery for more crude than Ewing Oil can supply, Bobby makes a deal with another refinery that will use all of Ewing Oil's reserves meaning that J.R. is all but guaranteed to be in breach of contract on his deal; Miss Ellie and Clayton track down the deposit box, but its contents only leads them on another search; a gallery owner expresses an interest in Cally's paintings as well as an interest in Cally; desperate for crude to meet the terms of his deal, J.R. cuts production at the Ewing Refinery, diverting the crude to the other refinery and then claims it was Bobby's decision; Cliff finally locates Afton in Charleston, S.C. and overhears her say that her ex-husband is really the father of her daughter, however after Cliff leaves Afton is relieved that Cliff will never learn the truth; Tommy obtains a bomb concealed in a briefcase and later makes a veiled remark to Carter about how he hopes to take care of Bobby Ewing.
310	3	"Cry Me a River of Oil"	Dwight Adair	Lisa Seidman	September 29, 1989	January 10, 1990	445603	17.5
Bobby finds out about the deal J.R. made behind his back and he lets J.R. know that he alone will be responsible for any penalties should he breach the contract; April warns Michelle to stay away from Cliff, but when Michelle intercepts Cliff's message to April arranging a dinner date she decides to show up in April's place; Cally is shocked to learn of J.R. and April's prior relationship and, while she forgives J.R. for not telling her, she begins to question the sincerity of April's friendship; when Herr Brundin comes to Dallas to finalize the deal with WestStar, Tommy expresses his disgust that Brundin lied to Carter about aspects of the deal, Tommy meets Brundin out on the street and pushes him into the path of an oncoming truck, killing Brundin; J.R. is able to find some of the oil he needs, but he can't get it shipped to Dallas soon enough, so a tanker owner suggests J.R. buy his own tanker.
311	4	"Ka-Booooom!"	Michael Preece	Louella Lee Caraway	October 6, 1989	January 17, 1990	445604	17.5
J.R. buys an unseaworthy tanker; wanting to end any association with J.R., April decides to sell the land that she and J.R. bought out from under Ewing Oil to Bobby, Bobby declines the offer and doesn't want Cliff to know, Michelle overhears this and tells Cliff; Rose Daniels visits Carter and Tommy takes an immediate disliking to her, believing her to be an opportunistic gold-digger; Tommy's bomb explodes.
312	5	"Sunrise, Sunset"	Dwight Adair	Howard Lakin	October 13, 1989	January 24, 1990	445605	17.9
Bobby suspects Tommy is behind the bomb and when Tommy inadvertently confirms his suspicions, Bobby informs Carter, Carter confronts Tommy and they struggle and Tommy is shot and killed; J.R. celebrates after his tanker finally arrives and he has enough oil to satisfy the terms of his deal; Alex Barton, the gallery owner, rents a studio for Cally to paint in and tells her that professionally, he wants to promote her as Cally Harper; J.R. mentions to Michelle that whoever gets Cliff Barnes to leave Ewing Oil will win the undying gratitude of him and his wallet; Carter is hit hard by Tommy's death and begins to revert to old behaviour; James Beaumont, Vanessa Beaumont's son, arrives in Dallas to see J.R.; April proposes to Bobby.
313	6	"Pride and Prejudice"	Michael Preece	Leonard Katzman	October 20, 1989	January 31, 1990	445606	18.9
Clayton and Miss Ellie continue their search in Pride, Texas, the place where Jock made his first oil strike and which is now nearly deserted; James gathers information about J.R. and Ewing Oil; J.R. and James have a bumpy first meeting, but afterwards quickly bond; Bobby wonders where his little boy went when Christopher becomes interested in a girl; Vanessa arrives in Dallas to take James home.
314	7	"Fathers and Other Strangers"	Irving J. Moore	Lisa Seidman	November 3, 1989	February 7, 1990	445607	18.0
Bobby tries to have 'the talk' with Christopher; having already pumped Kendall for information about J.R., James flirts with Sly and asks her more questions; Bobby and Cliff argue about Cliff's role at Ewing Oil; Miss Ellie and Clayton's search comes to a surprising end in Montana; J.R. gloats after hearing that a WestStar tanker is leaking oil in the Gulf; wanting a big cheque from J.R., Michelle is determined to convince Cliff to leave Ewing Oil; after J.R. speaks poorly of Ray because he is Jock's illegitimate son, James makes a toast to J.R. Ewing, his father.
315	8	"Black Tide"	Michael Preece	Howard Lakin	November 10, 1989	February 14, 1990	445608	17.7
While J.R. is thrilled with the news that James is his son, Cally believes that Vanessa wants to use this to steal J.R. away from her; Carter is enraged after hearing that the WestStar tanker started leaking oil because it was rammed by J.R.'s tanker and wants to blame the entire situation on Ewing Oil; Michelle finally convinces Cliff to leave Ewing Oil and Bobby feels betrayed when Cliff announces at a WestStar press conference that he has left Ewing Oil and that he will be heading a committee to investigate the spill; when Michelle meets with J.R. to collect her cheque for getting Cliff out of Ewing Oil, J.R. refuses to pay her; James tells Vanessa that if she wants J.R. she should fight for him, but she decides to return to Vienna; in return for getting Cliff to head up the committee going after Ewing Oil, Carter promises Michelle that at any time he will grant her one favor, regardless of what it is; James moves into Southfork.
316	9	"Daddy's Dearest"	Irving J. Moore	Mitchell Wayne Katzman	November 17, 1989	February 21, 1990	445609	17.7
John Ross returns from England to find that he is no longer J.R.'s eldest son; April throws Michelle out of her apartment, so Michelle moves in with Cliff; James moves into Cliff's old office at Ewing Oil; Carter serves Bobby with papers to sue Ewing Oil for damages relating to the oil spill and if successful the suit has the potential to put Ewing Oil out of business; Bobby and J.R. try to keep Cliff from heading the committee investigating the spill; James and Michelle meet and there is an instant attraction; Cliff is appointed to head the committee and has plans to use it as a springboard to the governor's office and secures Carter's support for his political aspirations.
317	10	"Hell's Fury"	Patrick Duffy	Lisa Seidman	December 1, 1989	February 28, 1990	445610	18.1
With some encouragement from James, Michelle agrees to spy on Cliff for J.R.; wanting to please J.R., John Ross tries to get know his new brother, but Christopher quickly realizes that while two is company, three is a crowd; while Bobby tries to discover the true cause of the tanker collision, J.R. reverts to his usual tactics to ensure that the committee rules in Ewing Oil's favor; knowing that James wants Cally out of J.R.'s life, Michelle lies to Cally about having an affair with J.R.; Bobby is shocked when Kay Lloyd, his former girlfriend from Washington, D.C., shows up in Dallas to inform him that if the investigative committee rules against Ewing Oil, the Justice Department may revoke his charter for Ewing Oil.
318	11	"Cally On a Hot Tin Roof"	Larry Hagman	Howard Lakin	December 8, 1989	March 7, 1990	445611	18.4
Cally accuses J.R. of having an affair with Michelle and confesses that, in retaliation, she spent the night with Alex Barton; April is jealous of Kay's past relationship with Bobby; J.R. threatens Alex to leave Dallas; J.R. seduces one of the committee members, Diana Farrington, to get her vote to protect Ewing Oil, later he throws his fling in Cally's face and she tells J.R. she lied about sleeping with Alex, J.R. doesn't believe her at first, but when Alex confirms that it's true, J.R. rushes home and is stunned by what he finds in his bedroom.
319	12	"Sex, Lies and Videotape"	Cliff Fenneman	Leonard Katzman	December 15, 1989	March 14, 1990	445612	20.5
The paramedics manage to revive Cally; Bobby is forced to sell three of Ewing Oil's best fields in order to pay for the clean up of the spill and is surprised to learn that the unknown buyer didn't take advantage of his situation and instead paid the full asking price; Carter tracks down Rose Daniels and asks her to come back to Dallas to be with him, but he has an ulterior motive; April rents office space for her oil company; although he and Cally have reconciled, J.R. sleeps with Diana Farrington again telling James that he is doing it strictly for Ewing Oil, but afterwards he feels guilty about betraying Cally and James is disgusted that J.R. would so callously cheat on his wife; wanting Cliff to suppress any information detrimental to WestStar that the investigation may find, Carter blackmails Cliff with a video of Cliff sleeping with Carter's new wife, Rose; Bobby tells April he wants to marry her.
320	13	"A Tale of Two Cities"	Leonard Katzman	Arthur Bernard Lewis	January 5, 1990	March 21, 1990	445613	18.9
Cally has a very successful gallery showing; even though Michelle and Cliff aren't romantically involved, James tells Michelle that he'd like to rent her own apartment so that he doesn't feel like they are sneaking around; Cliff tells Michelle about the video Carter is using to blackmail him and then Michelle informs Bobby; a series of events leads Michelle to believe that James cheated on her with Diana Farrington; Cliff gets information that suggests that the tanker collision was not Ewing Oil's fault, but merely an accident.
321	14	"Judgment Day"	Patrick Duffy	Amy Tebo	January 12, 1990	March 28, 1990	445614	18.9
Cliff struggles with the choice between telling the truth or letting Ewing Oil take full blame for the tanker collision; Michelle tells J.R. that she will no longer be his spy and confesses her deception to Cliff; confident of a guilty verdict against Ewing Oil, Carter offers to buy the company from Bobby before the committee announces its decision and the Justice Department revokes Ewing Oil's charter; Cliff renders the committee's decision.
322	15	"Unchain My Heart"	Irving J. Moore	Jackie Zabel & Bryce Zabel	January 19, 1990	April 4, 1990	445615	18.4
While out celebrating their engagement, Bobby learns that it was April who bought the three Ewing Oil fields and he is initially upset that she went behind his back, but by the time Bobby apologizes, April has already sold them, unknowingly, to Carter McKay; James finally convinces Michelle that he didn't sleep with Diana Farrington; on a high after the committee's verdict cleared Ewing Oil, J.R. is determined to get oil out of the reportedly dry field Jock first struck oil on years ago; Cliff is approached by Stephanie Rogers, who offers to make all his political aspirations come true; Bobby sees a woman he thinks could be Pam.
323	16	"I Dream of Jeanne"	Cliff Fenneman	Lisa Seidman	February 2, 1990	April 11, 1990	445616	17.9
Bobby learns that the woman he believed to be Pam is named Jeanne O'Brien; mistrustful of Stephanie's motives for helping him, Cliff has her investigated for a connection to J.R.; James attempts to get financing for a business venture, but finds it difficult without the Ewing name attached; Cally begins to feel that J.R. is putting Ewing Oil ahead of their marriage; J.R. travels to Oklahoma to locate an old friend of Jock's who he thinks can help him find oil on his dry field; being around Jeanne makes Bobby think of old memories of his life with Pam.
324	17	"After Midnight"	Ken Kercheval	Howard Lakin	February 9, 1990	April 18, 1990	445617	18.3
Bobby begins dating Jeanne, the Pam lookalike (but is it Jeanne he wants? Or Pam? Or does he still want April?); April is hurt when she sees Bobby out on a date with Jeanne; J.R.'s obsession with finding oil finally pays off; Michelle and April wants to open a singles complex, but the owner of the property they want won't sell, so Michelle decides to cash in on the favor Carter promised her and asks him to convince the owner to sell; James tries to become a partner in a lucrative deal, but the daughter of his partner plans to wreck his chances for a partnership unless James gives her what she wants – and what she wants is James.
325	18	"The Crucible"	Larry Hagman	Leonard Katzman	February 16, 1990	April 25, 1990	445618	17.2
J.R. puts a quick end to James' prospective business deal, angering James; Jeanne tells Bobby she's fine indulging Bobby's memories of Pam; Stephanie is doing an excellent job keeping Cliff's name in the public eye; Cally and Michelle get into an argument; J.R. and Cally's marriage continues to deteriorate; Carter comes through for Michelle; Bobby ends his relationship with Jeanne and finally says goodbye to Pam.
326	19	"Dear Hearts and Gentle People"	Irving J. Moore	Louella Lee Caraway	February 23, 1990	May 2, 1990	445619	17.6
Bobby tries to convince April to give him another chance; Miss Ellie and Clayton become involved in a murder mystery; Stephanie succeeds in getting Cliff appointed to the Oil Regulatory Commission; J.R. wants to put an end to Cliff's rise up the political ladder and decides the best way to accomplish that is by bringing down Stephanie; Cally considers leaving J.R., but feels she has nowhere to go, however, as far as J.R. is concerned their marriage is over.
327	20	"Paradise Lost"	Patrick Duffy	Lisa Seidman	March 9, 1990	May 9, 1990	445620	15.0
James and Michelle discover that the property they bought for the single's complex isn't zoned properly for their needs and they have to bring Carter McKay in on the deal in order to get the necessary clout to complete the project; J.R. offers Cally a fake apology, setting in motion his plan to make Cally leave him; J.R. learns that Stephanie is going through a divorce and tries to dig up some dirt on her from her soon-to-be ex-husband; Miss Ellie and Clayton believe they have solved the crime, now they need proof; Bobby tells April that he has done all he can do to prove his love for her and that the next move is up to her.
328	21	"Will Power"	Larry Hagman	Ken Horton	March 16, 1990	May 16, 1990	445621	15.4
Miss Ellie and Clayton continue to investigate the murders and make a gruesome discovery; April comes to a decision about her relationship with Bobby; construction of April and Michelle's single's complex hits a major roadblock; Cally gets a bleak view of the future of her marriage after appearing on a TV talk show featuring women who married older men; J.R. believes he has found the information he needs to take down Stephanie.
329	22	"The Smiling Cobra"	Cliff Fenneman	Howard Lakin	March 30, 1990	May 23, 1990	445622	17.4
J.R. is secretly behind the demolition order for April and Michelle's complex; Michelle is upset when April tells her that she is no longer interested in pursuing the project, and instead wants to focus on her future with Bobby; J.R. learns that James' support is the only thing keeping Cally at Southfork; Bobby and April set a wedding date; James is angry when he learns that the only reason J.R. wrecked the complex project was to ruin James' relationship with Michelle; J.R. finally pushes Cally to leave Southfork, but he is forced to ask her to stay when he sees how much her leaving hurts John Ross.
330	23	"Jessica Redux"	Irving J. Moore	Leonard Katzman	April 6, 1990	June 6, 1990	445623	15.6
Following the latest murder, Clayton and Miss Ellie realize that Clayton was the intended target; concerned that J.R. will use Stephanie to sabotage his rising political career, Cliff demands Stephanie not see J.R. anymore, but Stephanie doesn't like being told what to do; still believing in Michelle's idea even without April's participation, James purchases a restaurant for Michelle; Bobby asks Cliff to be his best man; Michelle is elated when J.R. tells her that James said he was going to marry Michelle, but is heartbroken when James tells her he only said it to annoy J.R.; thinking Clayton's psychopathic sister Jessica may have information regarding the murders, Clayton and Miss Ellie attempt to see her at the sanitarium, but are shocked to learn that she has been released; Cliff fires Stephanie after seeing her having dinner with J.R.; believing she has no future with James or in Dallas, Michelle accepts a high paying job in the Caribbean, but what she doesn't know is that J.R. is behind the offer; Jessica comes after Clayton.
331	24	"Family Plot"	Patrick Duffy	Lisa Seidman	April 13, 1990	June 29, 1990	445624	16.8
Jessica is interrupted before she can attack Clayton; J.R. uses the information he discovered to blackmail Stephanie; James realizes J.R. got Michelle out of town; J.R. calls Sue Ellen and arranges for her to persuade John Ross to visit London, believing it will make it easier for him to get rid of Cally; Stephanie puts an abrupt end to Cliff's gubernatorial aspirations; Jessica makes a full confession; Cally is upset when James tells her he is leaving Southfork; Jessica ends up with the voting rights for 25% of WestStar stock and Clayton intends to go to court to get control of them; after learning the lengths J.R. has gone to get Cally to leave him, Cally and James decide to turn the tables on him.
332	25	"The Southfork Wedding Jinx"	Irving J. Moore	Howard Lakin	April 27, 1990	June 29, 1990	445625	16.2
Putting their plan into motion, Cally tells J.R. that she accepts full blame for their problems and that from now on she won't question where or with whom he has been and James tells J.R. that he was perfectly right to get Michelle out of his life; Cliff meets Liz Adams, an old friend of Bobby's, who was recently left an oil company by her deceased brother; J.R. is not happy when he hears that Clayton intends to form a partnership with Carter McKay if he gets the voting rights to the WestStar stock; Cally reveals to April that she is pregnant and while she wants to leave J.R., she doesn't know if she could deprive her child of knowing its father, especially since she never got to know her parents; Bobby and April get married; as Bobby and April leave for their honeymoon. A mass exodus occurs: Miss Ellie and Clayton leave for a trip to the Orient, John Ross and Christopher go to visit Sue Ellen in London and Lucy moves to Italy; hoping to convince Jessica to sign the WestStar voting rights over to him, J.R. has himself committed to the sanitarium, but not before telling Cally that she has one week to get out of Dallas and out of his life.
333	26	"Three, Three, Three: Part I"	Leonard Katzman	Leonard Katzman	May 4, 1990	July 6, 1990	445626	17.1
James urges Cally to hire a divorce lawyer who then advises Cally to locate J.R. so that she can serve him with divorce papers before he serves her; Cliff tries to convince Liz to move to Dallas and when he introduces her to Carter it's clear that they have a history; in the sanitarium, J.R. has a lot of roadblocks to deal with in trying to see Jessica. NOTE: Mitch Pileggi, who appeared in this episode as Morrissey, would go on to play Harris Ryland in the TNT continuation of Dallas.
334	27	"Three, Three, Three: Part II"	Leonard Katzman	Leonard Katzman	May 11, 1990	July 6, 1990	445627	17.3
Liz tells Cliff that she thought that she recognized Carter McKay as someone she knew a long time ago in New York, but that his name wasn't Carter McKay; James and Cally learn that J.R. had himself committed to the sanitarium and then obtain his release papers by blackmailing the lawyer he had entrusted them to; when J.R. finally gets to see Jessica, he manipulates her into signing control of the WestStar stock over to him; James blackmails J.R. into signing a property settlement for Cally, but then refuses to have J.R. released from the sanitarium.

=== Season 14 (1990–91) ===
No. overall	No. in season	Title	Directed by	Written by	Original U.S. air date	Original U.K. air date	Prod. code	U.S. viewers (millions)
335	1	"April in Paris"	Leonard Katzman	Leonard Katzman	November 2, 1990	May 5, 1991	446151	17.2
Cally doesn't like hearing that James left J.R. in the sanitarium; while honeymooning in Paris, Bobby and April meet Sheila Foley, the widow of a Texas oilman who committed suicide when his company went bankrupt due to OPEC flooding the market with cheap oil; some of the patients at the sanitarium unknowingly destroy the document giving J.R. control of the WestStar stock and J.R. is frustrated to learn that Jessica has been transferred to another institution; Bobby and April are surprised to see Jordan Lee in Paris; having already made enemies in the sanitarium, J.R. is desperate to get out; Sheila kidnaps April and tells Bobby that she will be taking her place.
336	2	"Charade"	Irving J. Moore	Howard Lakin	November 9, 1990	May 12, 1991	446152	15.2
With little choice, Bobby is forced to agree to Sheila's terms; James loses a fortune, not to mention the nightclub he bought for Michelle to run, in a high-stakes poker game; still stuck in the sanitarium, J.R. manages to solve one of his problems; Liz's past is catching up with her; James is determined to prove that he is nothing like his father; things get more confusing for Bobby as he tries to get help finding April.
337	3	"One Last Kiss"	Leonard Katzman	Lisa Seidman	November 16, 1990	May 19, 1991	446153	15.2
At the sanitarium, J.R. finally manages to get a message to Sly, but then his doctor decides to start him on drug therapy; in Paris, Bobby is able to find where the kidnappers are holding April, but fails in his attempt to rescue her; Cally agrees to have J.R. released from the sanitarium, but first J.R. must agree to leave her alone following the divorce; J.R. fires Sly for allowing James to dupe her out of his release papers; Sheila reveals to Bobby that in order to gain access to an important oil conference with OPEC members in attendance, she needed to be, or pretend to be, the wife of an oilman; Bobby is shocked to learn that Jordan is a part of the kidnapping conspiracy.
338	4	"Terminus"	Irving J. Moore	Mitchell Wayne Katzman	November 23, 1990	May 26, 1991	446154	15.2
Sly is initially angry with James, blaming him for J.R. firing her, but then considers turning on J.R. when James suggests she use some of the dirt she has on J.R.; J.R. calls London to speak with John Ross and learns that Sue Ellen is now Mrs. Don Lockwood; Carter goes to Cliff offering his political support in return for a favor, but Cliff turns him down saying he doesn't need Carter's influence; Jordan pays the price for agreeing to help Bobby; Liz's criminal ex-boyfriend, Johnny, tracks her down in Dallas; J.R. is intent on destroying James and making him beg for forgiveness; gunfire erupts at the oil conference and someone is shot.
339	5	"Tunnel of Love"	Michael Preece	Howard Lakin	November 30, 1990	June 2, 1991	446155	15.3
Dallas reels from the news of April's death; heartbroken and alone, Bobby wanders the streets of Paris; Cliff asks Liz to marry him, but when she learns that Johnny was responsible for her brother's death, she is given the choice to marry Cliff or finally bring Johnny to justice; April's death leads James to try to make peace with J.R., but J.R. is not willing to listen; Liz rejects Cliff's proposal and ends their relationship; Bobby buys a detective agency and makes finding Sheila Foley their sole purpose; J.R. witnesses a public argument between Carter and a love-starved Rose and seizes the opportunity to gain some control over WestStar by giving Rose what she wants; Cliff is warned to never see Liz again; Bobby blames the oil business for April's death.
340	6	"Heart and Soul"	Nick Havinga	Lisa Seidman	December 7, 1990	June 9, 1991	446156	14.9
Michelle returns to Dallas furious that Bobby had April buried in Paris; Clayton also returns to Dallas, without Miss Ellie, to settle matters concerning the WestStar shares; not wanting to inadvertently hurt Bobby, Sly has a change of heart concerning her plan with James to get back at J.R.; however, James is as determined as ever to go ahead with the plan and takes Sly's records of J.R.'s misdeeds over the years; after Bobby tells Clayton to stay out of the oil business and just enjoy the rest of his life, Clayton offers the voting rights to the WestStar stock to Carter, so long as WestStar doesn't go after Ewing Oil; Cliff reacts badly when he sees Liz having dinner with Johnny; J.R. uses their indiscretion to blackmail Rose into bugging Carter's office at WestStar; Johnny tells Carter that he is going to take over WestStar; when Vanessa shows up at Ewing Oil, J.R. tells her that this time he's not letting her go; Johnny is found shot dead.
341	7	"The Fabulous Ewing Boys"	Michael Preece	Leonard Katzman	December 14, 1990	June 16, 1991	446157	14.8
J.R. apologizes to Sly for firing her and after she confesses that she gave James the information about J.R., he forgives her and hires her back; Carter threatens Rose to give him an alibi for the time of Johnny's murder; when Liz can't find Cliff, she wonders if he skipped town after killing Johnny; Vanessa is disappointed to learn that J.R. and James are not getting along; J.R. tells Vanessa that she is the one woman that he would be faithful to; during a conversation with Vanessa, Cally accidentally reveals that she is pregnant with J.R.'s child and she begs Vanessa not to tell J.R.; Michelle makes amends with Bobby; Bobby receives word that Sheila Foley has been found and then stuns J.R. by saying that he plans to sell Ewing Oil.
342	8	"The Odessa File"	Nick Havinga	Howard Lakin	December 21, 1990	June 23, 1991	446158	14.6
Carter tells Rose that the night of Johnny's murder he was in a top-secret meeting where he hoped to make a deal to sell his shares of WestStar; the Ewing lawyer informs J.R. that if Bobby wants to sell Ewing Oil, there is nothing J.R. can do to stop him and the Justice Department won't allow J.R. to own the company himself; Bobby is shocked to learn that the woman he met in Paris is not the real Sheila Foley; Rose confesses to Carter; J.R. tries to find someone who will buy Ewing Oil and then turn control of the company over to him, but when none of his friends are either rich or interested enough to do it, he attempts to make a deal with Carter in return for a tape J.R. has of Carter threatening Johnny; Bobby meets with LeeAnn De La Vega, a prospective buyer for Ewing Oil; J.R. asks Vanessa to marry him when his divorce is final; J.R. arrives too late to stop Bobby from selling Ewing Oil to LeeAnn.
343	9	"Sail On"	Michael Preece	Lisa Seidman	January 4, 1991	June 30, 1991	446159	16.8
Cliff's suspected involvement in Johnny's murder is putting his political future in jeopardy, ruining his relationship with Liz and causing him to drink; LeeAnn is out for revenge against J.R. and is disappointed when he doesn't recognize her; J.R. and Cally's divorce becomes final; Carter demands Rose do whatever she has to in order to get the tapes back from J.R.; at J.R. and Vanessa's engagement party, with Cally in attendance, James announces that Cally is pregnant with J.R.'s child; tired of being mistreated, Rose leaves Carter; Carter is arrested for Johnny's murder; Cally tells J.R. that James is the father of her child.
344	10	"Lock, Stock and Jock"	Nick Havinga	Mitchell Wayne Katzman	January 11, 1991	July 7, 1991	446160	16.5
J.R. confronts James with Cally's claim that James is the father of her baby and James, wanting to stick it to J.R., doesn't deny the accusation; with the threat of suspicion for Johnny's murder removed from their heads, Liz asks Cliff to propose to her again; the sale of Ewing Oil becomes final and after J.R. gets over the shock of seeing the Ewing Oil name gone, he accepts LeeAnn's offer to run the company in her absence in return for a small ownership of the company; LeeAnn tells Michelle that she met J.R. in college, became pregnant and after J.R. refused to marry her, she had an abortion that nearly killed her; J.R. asks Sly to keep working for LeeAnn so that she can spy on her; Carter gives the police his true alibi for the night of Johnny's murder, but the woman he was with refuses to corroborate his story; Bobby asks Liz to use her contacts to help him find the fake Sheila Foley; LeeAnn flirts with J.R. with the hope of ruining his relationship with Vanessa.
345	11	"'S' Is for Seduction"	Michael Preece	Howard Lakin	January 18, 1991	July 21, 1991	446161	14.4
LeeAnn reveals to Michelle that there is another aspect of her former relationship with J.R. that she hasn't told Michelle, but it is too painful to talk about; Liz tells Bobby that the fake Sheila Foley's real name is Hilary Taylor; during a conversation with Vanessa, Michelle embellishes her relationship with James, blames J.R. for breaking them up and lists numerous other ways J.R. hurt James; Carter's trial gets underway and later, he is eventually found guilty; when Vanessa expresses misgivings over LeeAnn possible feelings for J.R., J.R. dismisses her concern; Bobby learns that Hilary Taylor has a daughter; Cliff makes a confession.
346	12	"Designing Women"	Irving J. Moore	Lisa Seidman	February 1, 1991	July 28, 1991	446162	15.1
LeeAnn continues to play games with J.R. and dangles the possibility of getting Ewing Oil back in front of him; in the light of Cliff's confession to Johnny's murder, the DA, wanting to save face with the taxpayers for convicting an innocent man, manipulates evidence to have a mistrial declared and Carter is set free; realizing that her suspicions of J.R.'s fidelity are ruining their relationship, Vanessa ends her engagement to J.R. and returns to Vienna; with his name tarnished due to the trial, Carter is determined to find out who really killed Johnny; Bobby is having trouble letting go of the life he could have had with April; when J.R. informs LeeAnn that Vanessa has left and that he is now free to be with her, LeeAnn reveals their past connection and, before leaving, tells a stunned J.R. that Michelle is the new owner of what used to be Ewing Oil.
347	13	"90265"	Leonard Katzman	Leonard Katzman	February 8, 1991	August 4, 1991	446163	16.1
Michelle's first act as the new owner of the former Ewing Oil is to fire J.R., Sly and Phyllis; Bobby discovers that Jory Taylor, Hilary's daughter, is living in Malibu; J.R. laments that with Ewing Oil gone and Southfork practically empty, he feels all alone; depressed, he visits Sly at her apartment, and they wind up in bed together; as a further way to annoy J.R., Michelle convinces a somewhat reluctant James to marry her; J.R. asks James to move back to Southfork, but is livid when James moves in with his new wife; in order to get close to Jory to get information about Hilary, Bobby rents the beach house next to Jory's and lies about his last name; when he goes to his old office, J.R. is surprised to see the Ewing Oil name back on the wall, but disgusted when James announces that he is co-owner.
348	14	"Smooth Operator"	Larry Hagman	Lisa Seidman	February 15, 1991	August 11, 1991	446164	14.9
Hoping to gain an ally in getting revenge against LeeAnn, J.R. speaks with her sister-in-law who blames LeeAnn for over-working her brother to the point of death by a heart attack; Michelle wishes her marriage to James was a real marriage, but to James it is nothing more than a business arrangement; Jory opens up to Bobby about Hilary; when J.R. sees that a little kindness is changing James opinion of him and annoying Michelle, J.R. decides to give James the father he's always wanted; the boyfriend of one of Jory's roommates brings trouble to Bobby and Jory; J.R. sets up a plan to force Liz to sell her oil company to him.
349	15	"Win Some, Lose Some"	Patrick Duffy	Mitchell Wayne Katzman	March 1, 1991	August 18, 1991	446165	14.3
In order to secure an appointment for Cliff, Liz is compelled to sell her company to J.R.; when Jory is kidnapped, Bobby is forced to choose between saving Jory or capturing Hilary; Michelle attempts to seduce J.R. to show James that J.R. hasn't changed, but J.R. is more concerned about keeping his son; Cliff learns to whom Liz sold her company and why and his paranoia about being beaten by J.R. wrecks their relationship; Cliff wants revenge against J.R. and asks Michelle to help; Jory learns that Bobby only used her to find her mother, but Bobby won't hurt her by telling her why.
350	16	"Fathers and Sons and Fathers and Sons"	Larry Hagman	Arthur Bernard Lewis	March 8, 1991	August 25, 1991	446166	12.9
John Ross and Christopher are enjoying watching the joke that is James and Michelle's marriage; when Liz catches Cliff with another woman she realizes that there is no hope to salvage their engagement; Carter learns that Cliff was the one that murdered Johnny; Bobby decides to give up looking for Hilary and instead devote his time to being a good father to Christopher; the Ewing men participate in a cattle drive; J.R. meets a woman who claims to be James' wife and that he is the father of her son.
351	17	"When the Wind Blows"	Patrick Duffy	Louella Lee Caraway	March 29, 1991	September 1, 1991	446167	14.8
J.R. doesn't tell James about Deborah Lynn, the woman that claims to be his wife, and then worries that if James isn't legally married to Michelle, he will lose his 50% ownership of Ewing Oil; Carter wants Cliff to resign as Energy Czar and threatens to expose Cliff as Johnny's murderer; Bobby enjoys showing Christopher what he knows about cattle ranching; while J.R. starts to bond with his grandson, he tries to keep James and Deborah Lynn apart, at least until James can secure his shares of Ewing Oil; Bobby tries to be a friend to Cliff, but Cliff pushes him away; just as both J.R. and Michelle feel that they are going to have what they want, Deborah Lynn pushes her way into Southfork and announces to James that they are still married.
352	18	"Those Darned Ewings"	Dwight Adair	Ken Horton	April 5, 1991	September 8, 1991	446168	14.6
Jory comes to Dallas to tell Bobby that her mother has told her all about what happened in Paris; James and J.R. quickly fall in love with Jimmy, but John Ross is jealous of all the attention given his new nephew; J.R. realizes he may have to choose between losing Jimmy or losing Ewing Oil; wanting James to leave Michelle, Cliff tells James that there is nothing more important to a man than his son; James finally informs J.R. that he is the father of Cally's baby.
353	19	"Farewell, My Lovely"	Patrick Duffy	Lisa Seidman	April 12, 1991	September 15, 1991	446169	16.1
James tells J.R. to leave Cally and her baby alone and threatens J.R. with losing both James and Ewing Oil, but that doesn't deter J.R.; J.R. is elated when Clayton arrives with news that he is giving J.R. the voting rights to the WestStar stock, but then is angered after Clayton announces that Miss Ellie has deeded Southfork to Bobby; jealous of Jimmy and feeling neglected, John Ross tells Christopher that he wants to leave Southfork and live with Sue Ellen in London; J.R.'s detective locates Cally, but when he sees that she has found love again and is happy, he decides to leave her be; J.R. tells James that he doesn't care about Ewing Oil anymore and offers James the chance to work with him at his new company; James chooses to be with Jimmy and Deborah Lynn.
354	20	"Some Leave, Some Get Carried Out"	Leonard Katzman	Leonard Katzman	April 19, 1991	September 22, 1991	446170	16.1
Michelle is heartbroken after James tells her he is ending their marriage; Cliff seizes the opportunity to convince Michelle to sell him 50% of Ewing Oil and Michelle cons Cliff into paying what she paid for the whole company, but Cliff takes advantage of a drunken Michelle and gets her to marry him; after hearing J.R. forget his name when referring to 'his boys', John Ross has had enough and decides to move to London with Sue Ellen; tired of J.R. trying to control their lives, James and Deborah Lynn take Jimmy and move to Deborah Lynn's hometown; Hilary comes to Dallas to turn herself in and begs Jory not to abandon her; hungover and blaming J.R. for the end of her marriage to James, Michelle takes Cliff's gun, goes to Southfork and shoots someone.
355	21	"The Decline and Fall of the Ewing Empire"	Ken Kercheval	Lisa Seidman	April 26, 1991	September 29, 1991	446171	16.8
Michelle is arrested for killing Hilary; J.R. promises to get Michelle freed, but, in return, Michelle makes J.R. buy her 50% of Ewing Oil for what she paid for the whole company; J.R. is then shocked to find that he is equal partners with Cliff in the company, so when a couple of WestStar executives offer their support for J.R. to become the new Chairman of WestStar, he agrees to sell his 50% of Ewing Oil to Cliff; Carter surprises J.R. with the news that Dusty has sold him his shares of WestStar, the same ones to which J.R. had the voting rights; having lost Ewing Oil and WestStar and feeling abandoned by his family, J.R. becomes despondent and removes Jock's gun from his nightstand.
356	22	"Conundrum"	Leonard Katzman	Leonard Katzman	May 3, 1991	October 6, 1991	446172	33.3
357	23	"Conundrum"	Leonard Katzman	Leonard Katzman	May 3, 1991	October 6, 1991	446172	33.3
Feeling he has lost everyone and everything he cares about and nearing the point of suicide, J.R. is visited by Adam, who takes him on an It's a Wonderful Life-style journey to see what would have become of the Ewings had he never existed. J.R. continues his journey with Adam, seeing how the Ewing family would have evolved if he'd never existed; Bobby nears J.R.'s room as a gunshot rings out... In 2011, the whole two-part finale was ranked #13 on the TV Guide Network special, TV's Most Unforgettable Finales.

=== Telefilms and reunions ===
No.	Title	Directed by	Written by	Original release date	U.S. viewers (millions)	Rating/share (households)
1	"Dallas: The Early Years"	Larry Elikann	David Jacobs	March 23, 1986	N/A	21.3/33
2	"Dallas: J.R. Returns"	Leonard Katzman	Story by : Arthur Bernard Lewis; Teleplay by : Arthur Bernard Lewis and Leonard Katzman	November 15, 1996	19.20	13.4/23
3	"Dallas: War of the Ewings"	Michael Preece	Story by : Arthur Bernard Lewis; Teleplay by : Arthur Bernard Lewis and Julie Sayres	April 24, 1998	11.00	7.8/14

Non-fiction Specials

No.	Title	Directed by	Written by	Original release date	U.S. viewers (millions)
1	"Dallas Reunion: The Return to Southfork"	Michael Dempsey	Stephen Pouliot	November 7, 2004	12.73
2	"Bring Back... Dallas"	Simon Tucker & Simon Urwin	Unknown	July 7, 2007	N/A

== Ratings ==
Dallas (1978) : U.S. viewers per episode (millions)

Season	Episode number																															Average
Season	1	2	3	4	5	6	7	8	9	10	11	12	13	14	15	16	17	18	19	20	21	22	23	24	25	26	27	28	29	30	31	Average
1	21.5	15.2	15.8	21.2	21.8	–																										19.0
2	12.5	12.8	12.9	14.3	16.1	15.1	17.4	15.5	21.0	16.2	17.7	21.9	22.1	25.7	19.6	19.9	18.6	21.7	21.1	17.1	21.2	19.2	23.5	23.9	–							18.4
3	21.1	21.9	18.5	21.2	23.8	26.3	25.9	22.3	28.9	28.9	23.2	24.2	25.7	26.6	26.5	27.0	28.7	27.2	28.6	31.1	25.4	23.0	27.1	25.7	32.7	–						25.0
4	38.2	40.0	35.7	53.3	34.0	37.3	35.8	33.8	36.1	33.9	33.4	36.4	34.8	31.6	30.6	34.8	30.2	32.3	32.1	30.0	30.0	31.3	32.9	–								33.4
5	31.9	28.4	26.1	24.9	27.4	29.1	29.4	28.8	27.0	28.5	27.4	29.3	32.1	31.1	31.1	28.4	28.4	27.5	29.9	30.0	28.4	27.0	26.9	28.0	29.1	27.9	–					28.4
6	22.5	23.1	20.6	24.8	28.3	24.4	24.7	25.1	21.5	28.3	26.2	26.2	18.3	25.7	26.6	26.8	24.0	18.5	25.8	25.4	25.1	27.7	25.0	25.1	25.6	24.0	22.8	24.4	–			24.6
7	27.5	23.7	21.6	25.3	24.0	26.8	26.7	27.5	25.3	26.6	27.3	25.8	24.8	25.4	24.2	26.2	26.3	26.7	25.3	26.0	26.1	25.7	26.8	24.4	26.0	26.3	24.9	23.8	24.4	26.0	–	25.6
8	26.4	24.7	24.0	24.6	25.9	27.1	26.2	26.5	22.6	25.9	24.7	25.2	23.0	24.5	26.3	27.8	26.1	26.2	25.0	25.0	25.8	22.6	22.4	22.7	23.0	22.1	21.1	21.4	22.6	27.5	–	24.6
9	23.9	23.9	23.8	21.8	22.3	22.7	23.5	22.7	23.1	22.0	21.4	22.0	22.6	21.1	21.9	22.1	23.2	22.0	20.9	22.2	21.0	20.8	20.6	20.9	19.9	19.4	19.8	20.0	19.7	18.6	24.9	21.8
10	26.5	26.5	21.6	19.5	22.1	20.3	20.5	21.6	23.7	21.5	21.1	21.9	20.8	21.2	21.8	23.1	22.3	21.2	21.6	19.5	19.5	19.6	18.6	19.2	20.0	18.6	18.8	18.3	21.5	–		21.1
11	16.9	16.9	17.0	20.2	17.7	18.2	16.9	17.3	17.3	15.7	15.7	16.7	15.9	14.7	17.6	16.8	17.2	18.6	17.5	17.1	16.6	16.3	15.3	14.6	16.2	16.2	16.8	15.6	15.6	17.3	–	16.7
12	25.3	23.1	20.4	21.6	22.3	21.8	20.8	22.6	20.9	23.2	23.3	23.5	22.3	22.9	25.9	25.9	23.0	19.4	19.0	20.5	20.4	20.8	19.0	19.0	18.8	19.6	–					21.7
13	18.2	18.2	17.5	17.5	17.9	18.9	18.0	17.7	17.7	18.1	18.4	20.5	18.9	18.9	18.4	17.9	18.3	17.2	17.6	15.0	15.4	17.4	15.6	16.8	16.2	17.1	17.3	–				17.7
14	17.2	15.2	15.2	15.2	15.3	14.9	14.8	14.6	16.8	16.5	14.4	15.1	16.1	14.9	14.3	12.9	14.8	14.6	16.1	16.1	16.8	33.3	33.3	–								16.9

Audience measurement performed by Nielsen Media Research
