= Dallas season 6 =

Dallas
- Season 6
- DVD cover
- No. of episodes: 28

Release
- Original network: CBS
- Original release: October 1, 1982 – May 6, 1983

Season chronology
- ← Previous; Season 5 Next → Season 7

The sixth season of the television series Dallas aired on CBS during the 1982–83 TV season.

== Cast ==
=== Starring ===
In alphabetical order:

- Barbara Bel Geddes as Miss Ellie Ewing (28 episodes)
- Patrick Duffy as Bobby Ewing (28 episodes)
- Linda Gray as Sue Ellen Ewing (28 episodes)
- Larry Hagman as J. R. Ewing (28 episodes)
- Susan Howard as Donna Culver Krebbs (28 episodes)
- Steve Kanaly as Ray Krebbs (28 episodes)
- Ken Kercheval as Cliff Barnes (28 episodes)
- Victoria Principal as Pamela Barnes Ewing (28 episodes)
- Charlene Tilton as Lucy Ewing Cooper (26 episodes)

=== Also starring ===
- Audrey Landers as Afton Cooper (26 episodes)
- Howard Keel as Clayton Farlow (24 episodes)
- Priscilla Pointer as Rebecca Barnes Wentworth (18 episodes)
- John Beck as Mark Graison (13 episodes)
- Jared Martin as Steven "Dusty" Farlow (1 episode)

=== Special guest stars ===
- Dale Robertson as Frank Crutcher (5 episodes)
- E. J. André as Eugene Bullock (3 episodes)
- Nicholas Hammond as Bill Johnson (3 episodes)
- Donald Moffat as Brooks Oliver (3 episodes)
- Barry Corbin as Sheriff Fenton Washburn (2 episodes)
- Henry Darrow as Garcia (2 episodes)

=== Notable guest stars ===
Morgan Brittany (Katherine Wentworth) and Morgan Woodward (Punk Anderson) continue to appear, and among the actors to debut during the season are Lois Chiles (Holly Harwood), Timothy Patrick Murphy (Mickey Trotter), Roseanna Christiansen (Teresa), Danone Simpson (Kendall Chapman), Alice Hirson (Mavis Anderson), Kenneth Kimmins (Thornton McLeish), Kate Reid (Lil Trotter), Eric Farlow (Christopher Ewing), and Mary Armstrong (nanny Louise).

John Anderson appears in two episodes as Richard McIntyre - he will return as a "special guest star" during season 11, playing Dr. Herbert Styles. Additionally, Ben Piazza (Walt Discoll) appears in a major story-arc, but won't return for future seasons, and Knots Landing's Ted Shackelford (Gary Ewing) appears in one episode.

John Larroquette also appears in two episodes as Lucy Ewing's divorce attorney Phillip Colton.

== Crew ==
The season's episode writers include showrunner Leonard Katzman, the returning Arthur Bernard Lewis, David Paulsen, Howard Lakin, Will Lorin, Linda B. Elstad, and new additions Frank Furino and Robert Sherman.

Philip Capice serves as executive producer, Katzman as producer, Cliff Fenneman as associate producer, and writer Arthur Bernard Lewis as supervising producer. Writer David Paulsen, who joined the series for season four, takes on the duty of the show's story editor.

== DVD release ==
Season six was released by Warner Bros. Home Video, on a Region 1 DVD box set of five double-sided DVDs, on January 30, 2007. In addition to the 28 episodes, it also includes the featurette "Power and Influence: The Dallas Legacy".

== Knots Landing ==
After a one year-absence, the Dallas cast returned to appear in spinoff series Knots Landing, now on its fourth year: first J.R. (Larry Hagman) appeared alone in Daniel (airing October 7, 1982), and then he returned alongside Bobby (Patrick Duffy) and baby Christopher (Eric Farlow) in New Beginnings (October 29, 1982) - the last time any Dallas character appeared in Knots Landing.

== Episodes ==
No. overall	No. in season	Title	Directed by	Written by	Original U.S. air date	Original U.K. air date	Rating/share (households)
104	1	"Changing of the Guard"	Michael Preece	Arthur Bernard Lewis	October 1, 1982	October 6, 1982	22.5/38
J.R. is the focus of everyone's wrath at Southfork when he is blamed by the other Ewings, as well as Afton and Rebecca, for driving Cliff to attempt suicide. Bobby has his own reasons for being furious with J.R. after being blackmailed by him over Christopher's parentage. Lucy has her own worries as she waits for the results of her pregnancy test. Miss Ellie wants J.R. out as president of Ewing Oil. J.R. meets Holly Harwood and secretly buys 25% of her company, Harwood Oil.
105	2	"Where There's a Will"	Leonard Katzman	Leonard Katzman	October 8, 1982	October 13, 1982	23.1/40
J.R. schemes to get an advance look at Jock's will after discovering his father wished to have it sealed until it can be revealed to the entire family. Still feeling guilty about Cliff, Sue Ellen visits Clayton at the Southern Cross to think about remarrying J.R.. Pam persuades Lucy to see a doctor about her pregnancy. Afton is upset when Cliff rejects her attempts to look after him. Marilee Stone offers Cliff a position with her company. Ray and Donna get some disturbing news from Kansas about Amos Krebbs. Miss Ellie considers attending the Oil Barons Ball.
106	3	"Billion Dollar Question"	Michael Preece	Arthur Bernard Lewis	October 15, 1982	October 20, 1982	20.6/32
Bobby and J.R. agree that it is time Miss Ellie went out and met old friends. When Ellie decides to attend the Oil Barons Ball, J.R. again tries to persuade her to open the will; he then tries to force Bobby towards the same goal. Donna and Ray's long-delayed honeymoon is postponed when they have to go to Kansas for Amos Krebbs' funeral. Pam's concern for Lucy's depression prompts her to tell Bobby about her condition. J.R. uses John Ross as a pawn to win Sue Ellen back. Cliff cautiously accepts Marilee's job offer.
107	4	"The Big Ball"	Leonard Katzman	Leonard Katzman	October 22, 1982	October 27, 1982	24.8/41
The Oil Barons Ball opens up a new era for Miss Ellie. Sue Ellen is shocked when Dusty shows up at the Southern Cross while she is there visiting Clayton. Lucy decides she must get on with her life and put the past behind her. Ray tries to control his rebellious young cousin Mickey while he and Donna are in Kansas. J.R. and Bobby realise that the Ewing's will be alienated from the oil cartel if Cliff works with Marilee. J.R. arranges a big surprise for Miss Ellie at the ball.
108	5	"Jock's Will"	Michael Preece	David Paulsen	October 29, 1982	November 3, 1982	28.3/47
Miss Ellie painfully decides to declare Jock legally dead and the entire Ewing clan gather at Southfork for the reading of the will. Miss Ellie discusses the procedure for declaring Jock legally dead with the family attorney. Rebecca promises to use all her power and wealth to destroy the Ewings. Pam is torn between her love for Bobby and her loyalty to Rebecca. Ray and Donna bring Mickey back to Southfork. Sue Ellen and J.R. set a date for their re-marriage. The terms of Jock's will could ruin the entire Ewing family. This episode begins a crossover with Knots Landing that concludes on "New Beginnings".
109	6	"Aftermath"	Leonard Katzman	David Paulsen	November 5, 1982	November 10, 1982	24.4/40
Ewing Oil is split down the middle as J.R. and Bobby begin their year-long battle for control of the company. Miss Ellie and Pam worry that the battle may hurt the family. Rebecca warns J.R. that she will never forget what he did to Cliff. Lucy returns to modelling. Christopher's adoption goes to its second stage. Bobby considers a Canadian oil deal. Rebecca buys an oil company for Cliff. J.R. hires corrupt police detective Harry McSween to blackmail the head of the Office of Land Management.
110	7	"Hit and Run"	Michael Preece	Howard Lakin	November 12, 1982	November 17, 1982	24.7/40
J.R. arranges a fake hit and run accident in order to blackmail Walt Driscoll, the head of the Office of Land Management, into gathering him the variance he wants. Cliff is made president of the newly underway Barnes-Wentworth Oil. Afton warns Cliff and Rebecca not to use the company as a weapon against the Ewings. Miss Ellie accepts Frank Crutcher's invitation to lunch. Donna tells Miss Ellie that she should get used to the idea of seeing other men. Lucy discusses her divorce from Mitch with her lawyer. Cliff is approached about the same Canadian oil deal that Bobby is interested in. Pam helps Bobby clinch the Canadian deal which upsets Cliff.
111	8	"The Ewing Touch"	Leonard Katzman	Howard Lakin	November 19, 1982	November 24, 1982	25.1/40
J.R. is granted his oil variance and begins full production on his wells, while Walt Driscoll has to flee Dallas when news of the variance leaks out. The oil cartel cannot understand why J.R. is pumping to capacity when there is a glut of oil in the market. Sue Ellen asks Clayton if he will give her away at her wedding to J.R.. Miss Ellie tries to make peace with Rebecca, but Rebecca wants vengeance against the Ewings. Bobby and J.R. are not pleased when Miss Ellie brings Frank Crutcher to dinner. Ray tells Mickey to straighten out. Cliff lashes out at Pam for helping Bobby win the Canadian deal. Holly confronts J.R. about his pumping at full capacity. Donna discusses dismantling the OLM now that Walt Driscoll has proved how corrupt it is. Christopher is adopted at last.
112	9	"Fringe Benefits"	Michael Preece	Will Lorin	November 26, 1982	December 1, 1982	21.5/34
Sue Ellen and Afton both contend with the lecherous advances of a refinery owner who's pitching an attractive oil deal to both Cliff and J.R.. J.R. puts Miss Ellie on the defensive when he asks what Frank Crutcher means to her. Ellie tells Frank that she thinks that they are moving too fast. Bobby learns that there will be delays in drilling in Canada. Punk meets with Bobby to see if he knows what J.R. is doing with all the oil that his wells are pumping. Sue Ellen and Pam vow to remain friends despite the war between their husbands. Afton compromises herself to help Cliff get the oil refinery. The cartel sides with Cliff in the battle against J.R.. Pam asks Bobby to forget the Ewing Oil war and leave Southfork but Bobby refuses to give up the fight.
113	10	"The Wedding"	Leonard Katzman	Will Lorin	December 3, 1982	December 8, 1982	28.3/45
The wedding of J.R. and Sue Ellen brings Cliff to Southfork and sets into motion more intrigue and excitement. Mickey and Lucy meet but do not get off on the right foot. Ellie invites Clayton to stay at Southfork as her guest. Jordon Lee tells Bobby that he had better stop J.R. or Ewing Oil will be destroyed. Ray tells Mickey to stay away from Lucy. Afton is upset that Cliff still loves Sue Ellen. Lucy asks for an out-of-town modeling assignment so she won't have to attend the wedding. Rebecca notices Clayton's attraction to Miss Ellie. Donna agrees to serve on the Texas Energy Commission. Members of the oil cartel do not attend the wedding.
114	11	"Post Nuptial"	Michael Preece	David Paulsen	December 10, 1982	December 15, 1982	26.2/40
J.R. and Sue Ellen's wedding reception turns into a fist-throwing brawl, as Cliff comes to blows with J.R.. Bobby and the oil cartel suspect that J.R. is selling oil to an embargoed nation. Cliff and Rebecca unite the cartel in a plan to convince all the refinery owners in Texas not to deal with J.R.. On their honeymoon, Sue Ellen makes J.R. give her a promise of "total commitment". Holly confesses to Bobby that J.R. owns 25% of Harwood Oil. Pam advises Lucy to seek professional help. Bobby confronts J.R. with his involvement in Harwood Oil.
115	12	"Barbecue Three"	Leonard Katzman	Arthur Bernard Lewis	December 17, 1982	December 22, 1982	26.2/43
The annual Ewing barbecue is the scene of an angry confrontation between J.R. and a group of Texas oilmen led by Cliff. Bobby continues his investigation into where J.R. is shipping oil. Mickey asks Lucy on a date, but she turns him down. J.R. announces he is opening up a chain of cut-rate gas stations that will yield him enormous profits. Bobby vows to "fight dirty" just like J.R. in order to win control of Ewing Oil. Miss Ellie wonders if Jock made the right decision in dividing the company between J.R. and Bobby. After the confrontation at the barbecue between the oil cartel and the Ewings, Miss Ellie decides that drastic action must be taken.
116	13	"Mama Dearest"	Patrick Duffy	Arthur Bernard Lewis	December 31, 1982	December 31, 1982	18.3/35
Bobby reluctantly sides with J.R. when Miss Ellie threatens court action to contest Jock's will. Cliff and the cartel discuss how to beat J.R.'s cut-rate gasoline prices. Pam decides to support Miss Ellie in the fight to overturn Jock's will. Bobby and J.R. tell Miss Ellie they oppose her plans. J.R. gains media spotlight with his gasoline prices. Donna meets with resistance from the energy commission members when she tries to withdraw J.R.'s oil variance. While he is buying a new condo Cliff ignores Afton's desire for marriage . Bobby confronts Pam about her siding against him with regards to Jock's will. NOTE: This episode, Mama Dearest, is the only episode in Dallas history that aired in the UK before it aired in the US. The episode aired on the same day in both countries, but the US timezones are 5–8 hours behind the UK timezone.
117	14	"The Ewing Blues"	David Paulsen	David Paulsen	January 7, 1983	January 12, 1983	25.7/38
Miss Ellie faces a hard decision when she must decide whether to damage Jock's memory or see her family destroyed because of his will. Pam supports Miss Ellie's determined stand, which creates a breach between her and Bobby. She finds a strong ally in Mark Graison. J.R. and Sue Ellen further alienate themselves when they go on television to defend J.R.'s position in the oil industry and in Ewing Oil. Holly realises that her deal with J.R. has put her company in an untenable position and she goes to Bobby for advice. Bobby has to reluctantly antagonise the cartel in his need to beat J.R.. Lucy is secretly amused by her feud with Mickey. Donna is discouraged when the energy commission gives in to J.R.. Ray gives her much needed support which leads to conflict with J.R..
118	15	"The Reckoning"	Bill Duke	Will Lorin	January 14, 1983	January 19, 1983	26.6/41
The hearing to overturn Jock's will causes great emotional pain for Miss Ellie as well as further setting other undercurrents in the Ewing family into motion. If Jock's latest will is ruled invalid, an earlier one will leave Ewing Oil to Ellie and Ray and Gary without their trusts. Ellie assures Ray that he will get his share of the money, but Ray says he will not accept this form of charity. J.R. attacks Pam for interfering and asks Sue Ellen to try to persuade Pam to support Bobby's position against his mother. Sue Ellen discovers Mark's obvious attraction to Pam, and J.R. sees that as a weapon to use in his fight with Bobby. Rebecca asks Cliff and the cartel to hold any action against J.R. until the court's ruling on Jock's will. Donna continues her fight with the oil commission, aware that the outcome will affect J.R.'s gasoline futures.
119	16	"A Ewing Is a Ewing"	Larry Hagman	Frank Furino	January 28, 1983	February 2, 1983	26.8/41
In the aftermath of the court's ruling on Jock's will, Miss Ellie escapes from the tension at Southfork with a trip to Galveston, where she runs into an irate Clayton. He is still smoldering from J.R.'s use of Sue Ellen to get his excess crude refined at Clayton's refinery. Cliff contrives to get a political carrot dangled in front of J.R. to get him out of Dallas. The cartel agrees to Bobby's demands for his share of the Wellington field. Bobby discovers that energy commission member George Hicks has ties with J.R.. Holly gets to know the real J.R. Ewing and they both use threats to establish a new working relationship with each other. Mark pays a surprise visit to Pam at her studio.
120	17	"Crash of '83"	Bill Duke	Howard Lakin	February 4, 1983	February 9, 1983	24.0/36
Bobby is forced to copy his brother in dirty dealing, which turns his stomach and disgusts Pam. Bobby's underhandedness is to get George Hicks to reverse his stand on J.R.'s variance with the energy commission. J.R. modestly denies he has political aspirations as he desperately searches for a refinery to continue the cheap gasoline production which is making him a popular hero. Rebecca vows to use all of the Wentworth influence to prevent him from acquiring a refinery. Cliff discovers that Afton had an affair with Bill Thurman. J.R. is upset about his mother's friendship with Clayton. Afton receives some shocking news.
121	18	"Requiem"	Larry Hagman	Linda B. Elstad	February 11, 1983	February 16, 1983	18.5/25
Cliff blames himself after the crash of the Wentworth company plane, which his mother took as a passenger in his place. Rebecca's accident is the latest episode caused indirectly by the ongoing war between Cliff and J.R.. Before Rebecca dies, she makes Pam promise to protect Cliff. Katherine flies in to join Pam and Cliff for the funeral and lashes out at Cliff for letting their mother fight his battles with the Ewings. J.R. is stunned when the energy commission rescinds his variance to pump oil and he quickly makes contact with Driscoll to establish a Caribbean oil deal. Holly tries to use the variance ruling to force J.R.'s hand in her company, but he points out that he now controls Harwood Oil. At Southfork, Pam makes a shocking announcement to Bobby.
122	19	"Legacy"	Patrick Duffy	Robert Sherman	February 18, 1983	February 23, 1983	25.8/40
Pam leaves Bobby and Southfork taking Christopher with her, to the delight of J.R. and Katherine. J.R. sees Bobby's split with Pam as an advantage to himself in their business rivalry. Katherine has her own reasons for interfering in her half-sister's life. Rebecca's Will holds surprises when it is read, with Katherine again plotting against Cliff as well as Pam. Lucy rescues Mickey from a bar-room brawl and they start to form a friendship. Donna and Ray are surprised at the cartel's attitude towards Bobby. Clayton advises Ellie to forget the family troubles and get on with her life. He tells Sue EIlen he sees qualities in Ellie he once thought he saw in her. A nervous J.R. offers Bobby a compromise.
123	20	"Brothers and Sisters"	Larry Hagman	Will Lorin	February 25, 1983	March 2, 1983	25.4/40
Bobby and Pam are the target of one another's plotting which puts a greater strain on their relationship. With Katherine pursuing Bobby and Mark pursuing Pam, the separated pair find it difficult to reach each other. Miss Ellie finds that helping Clayton find a new home in Dallas after the sale of the Southern Cross is satisfying, much to the dismay of J.R.. J.R.'s budding popularity makes Donna and Ray realise that the outcome of his and Bobby's race for Ewing Oil could affect Dave Culver's future in the Senate. Holly again goes to Bobby for advice. Lucy and Mickey reach an understanding.
124	21	"Caribbean Connection"	Patrick Duffy	Will Lorin	March 4, 1983	March 9, 1983	25.1/39
Bobby discovers evidence proving that J.R. is illegally shipping oil to an embargoed nation. As Bobby plots to put a knot in J.R.'s Caribbean connection, J.R. again considers running for public office. Sue Ellen is concerned that her past may damage his chances for election. Pam is pushed further into the path of Mark by Cliff and Katherine. Holly again goes to Bobby for advice, but J.R. forces her into doing his bidding in spite of Bobby's counsel. Mickey gets Lucy involved with his misunderstandings with Donna and Ray. Ray rushes to help Bobby pin down J.R.'s involvement in the illegal oil shipments.
125	22	"The Sting"	Larry Elikann	David Paulsen	March 11, 1983	March 16, 1983	27.7/42
Bobby springs his trap on J.R., equalizing the two brothers in the race for Ewing Oil unless J.R. can neutralize the harm done to his Caribbean deal. Katherine offers to supply information to J.R. to help in their common rivalry with Cliff, as well as Bobby. Miss Ellie realises that Bobby and Pam's split might not be temporary. Lucy puts her trust in Mickey, making him understand the reason for her past coldness. The cartel is happy to see Cliff back on his feet, which is due largely to Pam and Mark. Bobby meets Mark in Pam's hotel suite and the confrontation leads to a further rift in his and Pam's marriage. Driscoll vows revenge on J.R., as does Holly, and J.R. faces the fact that they are but two on a long list.
126	23	"Hell Hath No Fury"	Ernest Pintoff	Arthur Bernard Lewis	March 18, 1983	March 23, 1983	25.0/42
J.R. gets ready for his trip to Cuba. After suffering a $17 million loss, Holly tells Bobby that she's determined to get the Ewing brothers out of her life. Lucy enjoys modelling again and continues to see Mickey. Bobby runs into more weather problems on his Canadian deal. J.R. encourages Katherine to move in on Bobby. Holly declares a truce with J.R. and tries to seduce him. Bobby and Pam spend the night together, but when he wants her to go back to Southfork, she tells him that the night was "just a moment" and so they break up again. J.R. tries to force Driscoll to tell him the name of his contract man in the Caribbean. J.R. and Sue Ellen appear on television again where he sets the stage for his Cuban trip. Ray offers Bobby his financial support in the battle with J.R.. Bobby tells Donna and Ray that it's too late to save his marriage. Katherine urges Mark to take Pam to France. Holly tells Sue Ellen of her relationship with J.R. The State Department clears J.R.'s trip to Cuba. Sue Ellen finds proof of J.R.'s marital infidelity.
127	24	"Cuba Libre"	Robert C. Thompson	Leonard Katzman	March 25, 1983	March 30, 1983	25.1/39
J.R. finds the Ewing name doesn't mean much in Cuba when he arrives there to negotiate his and Holly's oil shipments. Before he leaves for the Caribbean, J.R. is promised an ample reward by Holly if he is able to recover their money. While J.R. is away, Sue Ellen confronts Holly to disprove his infidelity. Mickey's mother visits Southfork at Donna's invitation. Mickey is embarrassed to introduce his mother to Lucy. Katherine shows Bobby a possible way to solve his Canadian dilemma. Bobby and Cliff meet accidentally and have a confrontation about the Canadian deal as well as Bobby's troubled marriage. In the meantime, Pam and Mark enjoy the Riviera together. Miss Ellie and Clayton are the subject of much speculation. Ellie has feelings that she does not want to face.
128	25	"Tangled Web"	Nicolas Sgarro	David Paulsen	April 1, 1983	April 6, 1983	25.6/41
J.R.'s Cuban deal sets up a string of events involving Bobby, Pam, Sue Ellen and Holly. Bobby's illusions about the even race he is having with J.R. for Ewing Oil is shattered by a box of Cuban cigars. Bobby finds out that Pam is in France with Mark, where they are discovered by friends from Dallas. Ray confesses to Lil that Jock was his father. Afton defends Cliff and orders Katherine out of their house. Miss Ellie is concerned about Clayton and Sue Ellen's relationship and is not sure she believes Clayton's explanation. Sue Ellen makes a devastating discovery.
129	26	"Things Ain't Goin' Too Good at Southfork"	Gunnar Hellström	Leonard Katzman	April 15, 1983	April 20, 1983	24.0/39
Sue Ellen returns to her drinking ways after she discovers J.R. in Holly's bedroom. Sue Ellen staggers to Clayton's hotel room for help and Miss Ellie can't understand when she finds them together. Pam returns to confront Bobby and faces the decision to either help her husband in his fight for Ewing Oil, and possibly lose him forever, or not help him and perhaps lose him to Katherine. Lucy and Mickey try to help Sue Ellen, with tragic results.
130	27	"Penultimate"	Nick Havinga	Howard Lakin	April 29, 1983	May 4, 1983	22.8/38
Lucy bitterly blames Sue Ellen for the accident which has injured Mickey. The Ewing clan gathers at the emergency hospital where Sue Ellen and Mickey have been taken after the car crash on the Southfork road. Lucy is especially upset because the doctors will not let her into the room where they are treating Mickey and she lashes out at Sue Ellen for her drunken driving. Ray blames himself for bringing Mickey to Texas from his Kansas home. Clayton confronts J.R. for the actions which drove Sue Ellen back to seeking refuge in alcohol. Bobby blames Holly for the intrigue she set up which has shattered Sue Ellen's faith in J.R..
131	28	"Ewing Inferno"	Leonard Katzman	Arthur Bernard Lewis	May 6, 1983	May 11, 1983	24.4/39
Ray pressures Sheriff Washburn to find the hit-and-run driver that crashed into the car that Sue Ellen and Mickey were in. Holly wants to pay J.R. his $20 million in instalments but J.R. objects, rightly detecting Bobby's hand. J.R. gets a slap in the face from Pam during an argument over her trip to France. Mark convinces Pam to vote with Katherine and give the drill to Bobby. Mickey's condition continues to be very serious and Lil even goes as far as to say that perhaps it would have been better if he had died on the spot. J.R. tells Bobby that they should consider stopping the fight for control of Ewing Oil. Pam wants a divorce. Clayton convinces Ellie to take a break from family problems and go away with him. Katherine tries to console Bobby after he gets the news about the divorce. Ray learns that Walt Driscoll was driving the car that hit Mickey and Sue Ellen, prompting him to blame J.R. for Mickey's injuries. Ray and J.R. engage in a terrible fight causing a major fire at Southfork. J.R., Ray, Sue Ellen and John Ross are trapped as the flames engulf the ranch.
