= Dallas season 8 =

Dallas
- Season 8
- DVD cover
- No. of episodes: 30

Release
- Original network: CBS
- Original release: September 28, 1984 – May 17, 1985

Season chronology
- ← Previous; Season 7 Next → Season 9

The eighth season of the television series Dallas aired on CBS during the 1984–85 TV season.

== Cast ==
=== Starring ===
In alphabetical order:

- Patrick Duffy as Bobby Ewing (30 episodes)
- Linda Gray as Sue Ellen Ewing (30 episodes)
- Larry Hagman as J. R. Ewing (30 episodes)
- Susan Howard as Donna Culver Krebbs (29 episodes)
- Steve Kanaly as Ray Krebbs (30 episodes)
- Howard Keel as Clayton Farlow (26 episodes)
- Ken Kercheval as Cliff Barnes (30 episodes)
- Priscilla Beaulieu Presley as Jenna Wade (29 episodes)
- Victoria Principal as Pamela Barnes Ewing (30 episodes)
- Donna Reed as Miss Ellie Ewing Farlow (24 episodes), billed under "Also starring" status for her first episode
- Charlene Tilton as Lucy Ewing Cooper (30 episodes)

=== Also starring ===
- Jenilee Harrison as Jamie Ewing Barnes (27 episodes)
- Deborah Shelton as Mandy Winger (27 episodes)
- Morgan Brittany as Katherine Wentworth (5 episodes), billed under "Special guest star" status for her final episode
- Dack Rambo as Jack Ewing (5 episodes)
- Leigh McCloskey as Mitch Cooper (4 episodes)
- Jared Martin as Steven "Dusty" Farlow (2 episodes)
- Audrey Landers as Afton Cooper (1 episode)

=== Special guest stars ===
- Stephen Elliott as Scotty Demarest (11 episodes)
- Daniel Pilon as Naldo Marchetta (7 episodes)

=== Notable guest stars ===
In addition to several guest actors continuing to appear on the show, Burke Byrnes (Pete Adams) is added to the cast, and William Smithers (Jeremy Wendell) returns after a two-year absence. Sarah Cunningham also returns after four years, as Cliff and Pam's aunt, Maggie Monohan. Additionally Fredric Lehne (Eddie Cronin) and Kathleen York (Betty) appear in a major story-arc, although neither of them will return for subsequent seasons.

== Crew ==
Showrunner Leonard Katzman, Arthur Bernard Lewis and David Paulsen remain the core writers, although Peter Dunne, in preparation for taking over showrunning duties during the following season, writes two episodes in place of Leonard Katzman.

For the fourth consecutive year, the production team remains the same: Philip Capice serves as executive producer, Katzman as producer, Cliff Fenneman as associate producer, and writer Arthur Bernard Lewis as supervising producer. After two years as story editor, writer David Paulsen is now billed executive story editor.

== DVD release ==
The eighth season of Dallas' was released by Warner Bros. Home Video, on a Region 1 DVD box set of five double-sided DVDs, on February 12, 2008. In addition to the 30 episodes, it also includes the featurette "Dallas Makeover: Travilla Style".

== Episodes ==
No. overall	No. in season	Title	Directed by	Written by	Original U.S. air date	Original U.K. air date	Prod. code	Rating/share (households)
162	1	"Killer at Large"	Leonard Katzman	Arthur Bernard Lewis	September 28, 1984	November 7, 1984	173101	26.4/44
Afton discovers Bobby's body in J.R.'s office and calls an ambulance. J.R. is not worried when Ray tells him that Randolph is back in Dallas. When he learns about Bobby's shooting, J.R. assumes that he was the target, not Bobby. Cliff learns that he has struck oil. Katherine is in shock when she hears Bobby is recovering. Bobby is left blind by the bullet wound. Marilee is angry at J.R. because he talked her out of partnering with Cliff. Randolph tries to shoot J.R. but misses and he is then taken into custody as the suspected shooter, but when he is cleared by police, Bobby and J.R. realize that the real shooter is still at large.
163	2	"Battle Lines"	Nick Havinga	Arthur Bernard Lewis	October 5, 1984	November 14, 1984	173102	24.7/21
Bobby tells Donna and Ray that his office phone was bugged. Bobby tells Jenna that he won't marry her unless he regains his sight. Cliff tells Sly that he wants her to continue spying on J.R., but Sly goes back and reports everything to J.R. for whom she is really spying. Pam tells Bobby that Katherine wrote the letter that prompted their divorce. Donna moves into Bobby's office to handle his interests while he's in the hospital, which makes J.R. furious. Clayton learns of Bobby's shooting but promises not to tell Miss Ellie until they come back from their honeymoon. Cliff is arrested for the attempted murder of Bobby after the police find the gun in his townhouse.
164	3	"If at First You Don't Succeed"	Leonard Katzman	David Paulsen	October 12, 1984	November 21, 1984	173103	24.0/37
J.R. tells Bobby about Cliff's arrest and confesses that he set up Cliff and Randolph. Pam tells J.R. she plans to help Cliff ruin him. Bobby decides to have risky surgery to restore his vision. Lucy gets a waitress job at The Hot Biscuit, as the owner remembers Valene. Mandy Winger identifies Cliff in a police lineup as the man she was with at the time of Bobby's shooting. Katherine reacts strongly to a radio report that Cliff was cleared of charges. Harv Smithfield informs the Ewings that Jock's estranged brother, Jason Ewing, has died of an apparent heart attack in Alaska. Katherine enters Bobby's hospital room to give him an injection.
165	4	"Jamie"	Nick Havinga	David Paulsen	October 19, 1984	November 28, 1984	173104	24.6/40
Katherine is just about to give Bobby a fatal injection when he wakes up and begins to scream. The noise brings J.R. back into Bobby's room where he is able to stop Katherine from killing Bobby. Katherine admits to having tried to kill Bobby and is hauled off to jail. Bobby's sight returns and a week later he is back at Ewing Oil. Donna tells Bobby she's invested some of her own money in a small oil company, but hasn't told Ray yet. J.R. explains why he bugged Bobby's phone. Ray discovers Lucy's waitress job at the restaurant, but she swears him to secrecy. Jamie Ewing comes to Southfork and announces that she's the daughter of Jock's recently deceased brother.
166	5	"Family"	Leonard Katzman	Leonard Katzman	October 26, 1984	December 5, 1984	173105	25.9/42
Jamie tells the Ewings that her father died penniless and that she also has a brother. J.R. wants proof that Jamie is really a Ewing. Bobby tells J.R. that he can't get Pam off his mind. Cliff agrees to consider an offer by Jeremy Wendell that involves WestStar's acquisition of Barnes-Wentworth Oil. Jenna is puzzled when Jamie tells her that Jason liked Jenna's father, which contradicts Jenna's impression that the two men hated each other. Pam and Jackie are mystified when they spot Mark's car outside the Barnes-Wentworth offices.
167	6	"Shadow of a Doubt"	Nick Havinga	Leonard Katzman	November 2, 1984	December 12, 1984	173106	27.1/43
Wanting to prevent a powerful union between WestStar and Barnes-Wentworth, J.R. tells Sly to confirm Cliff's mistaken suspicions that he is behind the offer. Pam learns that the preservation of Mark's possessions is required until his estate is settled. Bobby is ready to make wedding plans with Jenna. Cliff rejects Wendell's offer. Pam receives flowers with a card saying that they are from Mark, which makes her believe he is indeed alive. Or is he? NOTE: This episode was filmed at Schlitterbahn in New Braunfels, Texas.
168	7	"Homecoming"	Gwen Arner	Arthur Bernard Lewis	November 9, 1984	December 19, 1984	173107	26.2/42
J.R. complains to Bobby about losing three employees to Barnes-Wentworth Oil and expresses concern about the potentially formidable Cliff/Pam alliance. Bobby wants to take down Jock's portrait at Southfork before Miss Ellie and Clayton return from their honeymoon, but J.R. disagrees saying it would dishonor Jock's memory. Pam hires a salvage specialist to search the plane wreckage in hopes of determining Mark's fate. Miss Ellie and Clayton return home. Pam decides to go out with Dave Straton, although she still thinks he is more concerned with the WestStar merger. Eddie Cronin, a customer at the restaurant where Lucy works, discovers that Lucy is a Ewing. Miss Ellie begins to realize that Clayton is sensitive to the symbols of her life with Jock.
169	8	"Oil Baron's Ball III"	Michael Preece	David Paulsen	November 16, 1984	December 26, 1984	173108	26.5/43
Unable to handle her role as J.R.'s spy, Sly requests a few months off from work. Bobby fails to persuade Pam to abandon the salvage mission and accept Mark's death. Miss Ellie treats Clayton to a night at a hotel and later surprises him with new bedroom furniture. Clayton admits he feels uncomfortable at Southfork with the shadow of Jock's memory. Cliff fears Pam is headed for a nervous breakdown. J.R. spots Mandy at the Oil Baron's Ball and wants to meet her. He is later surprised to see Mandy with Cliff. J.R. announces that Bobby and Jenna will marry in a month and Pam is devastated by the news.
170	9	"Shadows"	Gwen Arner	David Paulsen	November 23, 1984	January 2, 1985	173109	22.6/38
When Bobby verbally attacks J.R. for announcing the wedding date at the Oil Baron's Ball, J.R. swears it wasn't his intention to embarrass Pam. Miss Ellie sees that Clayton is still uneasy about Jock. J.R. hires a private detective to investigate Mandy. Donna suggests that Miss Ellie remove Jock's portrait. She does, saying it now belongs at Ewing Oil. Lucy agrees to go on a date with Eddie. Jenna sees Naldo outside her house.
171	10	"Charlie"	Michael Preece	Leonard Katzman	November 30, 1984	January 9, 1985	173110	25.9/41
Bobby advises Jenna to tell Charlie that Naldo Marchetta is her father. Jamie promises Sue Ellen that she will consider taking a job at Ewing Oil. Cliff is convinced that J.R. and Wendell have joined forces to ruin him. Ray tells Donna about Lucy's job as a waitress. Charlie disappears and Marchetta is under suspicion. J.R. introduces himself to Mandy. Cliff, hearing that J.R. has made a pass at Mandy, encourages her to accept J.R.'s advances and spy for him. Ray finds Charlie asleep in her horse's stall. Charlie later tells Jenna and Bobby that she was confused when she saw her birth certificate naming Bobby as her father.
172	11	"Barbecue Five"	Gwen Arner	Arthur Bernard Lewis	December 7, 1984	January 16, 1985	173111	24.7/38
With Cliff's approval, Mandy keeps a lunch date with J.R.. Pam visits Mandy's psychic who states that Mark is alive. Cliff confronts Wendell regarding the deal with J.R., but Wendell suggests that Cliff is paranoid and denies that J.R. was behind the merger offer. Marchetta announces that he intends to re-marry Jenna. Ray goes to the barbecue alone when Donna's business matters prevent her from attending. J.R. is pleased when he realizes that Mandy has provided a new "pipeline" to Cliff's head. When J.R. orders Jamie off the ranch, she produces a legal document stating that Ewing Oil is jointly owned by her father, Jock and Digger Barnes. Bobby gives Jenna an engagement ring week before the wedding.
173	12	"Do You Take This Woman..."	Michael Preece	Leonard Katzman	December 14, 1984	January 23, 1985	173112	25.2/39
Eddie seduces Lucy in a deserted stable. J.R. and Bobby decide to buy the WestStar fields after reading a favorable report. J.R. tells Mandy he hopes Cliff becomes preoccupied with proving Jamie's document is legal so he can move in and destroy Barnes-Wentworth Oil. Mandy passes on J.R.'s thoughts to Cliff. Jenna is panic stricken when she learns that Marchetta has picked up Charlie from school. Jenna doesn't show up for her wedding ceremony. Later, Bobby and J.R. find a note at Jenna's house saying that she can't marry Bobby because she loves someone else.
174	13	"Deja Vu"	Leonard Katzman	David Paulsen	December 21, 1984	January 30, 1985	173113	23.0/37
J.R. and Bobby plan to search for Jenna, who they believe has run away with Marchetta. Cliff tells Mandy that he doesn't want Bobby and Pam to reconcile any more than J.R. does. Pam must hide her happiness at the news of Bobby's cancelled wedding. Cliff and J.R. agree to work individually to keep Pam and Bobby apart. Marchetta tells Jenna that Charlie is on a plane to Rome and that she now must do what he says if she wants to get her back. J.R. pays off a charter pilot, Gerald Kane, to mislead Pam into searching for Mark in the Caribbean. Jenna and Marchetta marry as Bobby looks on from across the street.
175	14	"Odd Man Out"	Larry Hagman	Arthur Bernard Lewis	December 28, 1984	February 6, 1985	173114	24.5/38
J.R. tries to console Bobby about Jenna's marriage to Marchetta. Mandy tells Cliff that she likes J.R. and pretends to be teasing though she really may be serious. J.R. tells Bobby that Pam doesn't care about him because she's obsessed with finding Mark. Jenna, being held captive by Marchetta, tries to call Bobby for help. Jenna follows Marchetta into a dimly lit room and a man's hand goes over her face. A dazed Jenna, with gun in hand is cornered by police as she spots Marchetta, who lies dead on the floor nearby. NOTE: Following the broadcast of this episode in the UK, the BBC pulled their broadcasts of season 8 episodes for seven weeks due to Thames Television of ITV having bought the rights for season 9 by outbidding the BBC. The BBC then threatened to broadcast the remaining 16 episodes of season 8 directly up against ITV's season 9 episode transmissions. The controversy resulted in many questions about the issue in the British parliament. The BBC eventually relented and resumed their transmission of the remaining season 8 episodes, while the British government put heavy pressure on Thames Television to sell their rights to season 9 to the BBC at a loss, which was eventually done when Thames Television were ordered to do so by the Independent Broadcasting Authority.
176	15	"Lockup in Laredo"	Patrick Duffy	David Paulsen	January 4, 1985	March 27, 1985	173115	26.3/38
The Ewings are informed that Jenna has been arrested in Laredo for murdering Marchetta. Bobby visits Jenna who tells him that Charlie may be in Rome. Jenna pleads not guilty to the murder charge, but the judge refuses to release her on bail. Pam continues to search the clinics in the Caribbean for Mark. Eddie agrees to consider Lucy's suggestion that they become partners in a construction project. Jenna's attorney, Scotty Demerest, questions her and she says she may have been chloroformed. Jamie sees J.R. cuddling with Serena during lunch. Sue Ellen hears Jamie blasting J.R. for his behavior with Serena and JR tells Jamie to leave Southfork, and Jamie announces that she may use her document dividing Ewing Oil after all.
177	16	"Winds of War"	Leonard Katzman	Leonard Katzman	January 11, 1985	April 3, 1985	173116	27.8/41
Demerest tells Bobby that a full set of Jenna's fingerprints were found on the gun that killed Marchetta. Marchetta's accomplice, Veronica, calls and arranges to meet Bobby in California to discuss Charlie's release. Bobby later learns that she wants $50,000 and he agrees to pay it. An entry in Sam Culver's journal indicates that an agreement was signed dividing ownership of Ewing Oil between Jock, Digger and Jason. Sue Ellen tells J.R. that she wants them to have separate bedrooms again. Cliff realises that J.R. has been wooing Mandy in order to transmit false information to him. Cliff wins over Jamie who agrees to help him defeat J.R..
178	17	"Bail Out"	Michael Preece	David Paulsen	January 25, 1985	April 10, 1985	173117	26.1/39
Mandy hangs up on J.R. as he tries to make a date with her. She later confronts J.R. for using her against Cliff, but J.R. reminds her that she's guilty of the same crime. Jenna is released on bail and moves into the Southfork guest bedroom. Bobby wants to quietly marry her but Jenna can't think of marriage until the trial is over. Eddie is upset by Ray's suggestions for the apartment building specs. Pam confesses that she was only going to marry Mark because he was terminally ill. Gerald Kane meets with Pam to tell her that J.R. paid him to trick her into looking for Mark.
179	18	"Legacy of Hate"	Robert Becker	Arthur Bernard Lewis	February 1, 1985	April 17, 1985	173118	26.2/39
Pam joins forces with Cliff and Jamie to destroy Ewing Oil. Bobby is concerned by his rekindled feelings for Pam. Mandy feels guilty over sleeping with J.R. and continuing to spy for Cliff. Cliff's lawyer feels the document will withstand scrutiny in the trial to divide Ewing Oil. Lucy is blinded by her desire to please Eddie. Mandy decides she doesn't want anything to do with Cliff or J.R.. Bobby, J.R. and Miss Ellie are served with summons to a hearing attempting to freeze all Ewing Oil assets.
180	19	"Sins of the Fathers"	Larry Hagman	Leonard Katzman	February 8, 1985	April 24, 1985	173119	25.0/38
Mandy is still not sure that she's over Cliff, but tells J.R. not to call her for a few days. Cliff wins a small victory when the judge temporarily grants an injunction against Ewing Oil. A worried J.R. meets with Carl Hardesty, who previously set up dummy holding corporations for him. Cliff's victory is short-lived when the judge rescinds the injunction. Demerest tells Bobby and Jenna that Jenna's prints were on the murder weapon. Brindle gives Cliff Digger's copy of the document confirming that Jock gave Digger one-third of Ewing Oil.
181	20	"The Brothers Ewing"	Patrick Duffy	David Paulsen	February 15, 1985	May 1, 1985	173120	25.0/38
Cliff basks in the triumph of acquiring Digger's copy of the document. J.R. craves compassion from Sue Ellen, but she has no sympathy for him. Ray escorts Brindle to the airport with instructions from J.R. to call if he remembers anything else about the agreement. Pam convinces Sue Ellen to join her in Hong Kong, where Pam will continue her search for Mark. Eddie tells Betty that Lucy is just a nice kid with a lot of money.
182	21	"Shattered Dreams"	Nick Havinga	Arthur Bernard Lewis	February 22, 1985	May 8, 1985	173121	25.8/41
J.R. confides in Mandy about the hurt he feels due to the split amongst the family. Donna and Ray argue over J.R.'s tactics to save Ewing Oil. A frightened Veronica Robinson agrees to testify at Jenna's trial. Pam confesses that she still has strong feelings for Bobby. J.R. meets with Conrad Buckhouser about converting some of his assets to cash which will be placed in a Swiss bank account. Lucy is shocked when she learns that Eddie is romancing both her and Betty. Cliff tries to win points with Jamie by offering her a job at Barnes-Wentworth Oil. Bobby and Jenna discover the dead body of Veronica in the airplane lavatory.
183	22	"Dead Ends"	Michael Preece	Leonard Katzman	March 1, 1985	May 15, 1985	173122	22.6/37
Pam and Sue Ellen take in all the local colour at a Hong Kong outdoor market during their search for Mark. Jamie is hired at Barnes-Wentworth Oil as a resident expert on cold-weather drilling. Pam learns that the patient, who she believes is Mark, doesn't want to see anyone. Eddie apologizes for hurting Lucy. Donna tries to understand Ray's motivation for throwing in with J.R. J.R. and Cliff come to blows over Mandy at the Oil Barons Club. Donna strikes oil.
184	23	"Trial and Error"	Larry Hagman	David Paulsen	March 8, 1985	May 22, 1985	173123	22.4/35
During her trial, the D.A. promises to put Jenna behind bars for her crime. Pam suspects J.R. is behind her wild goose chase to Hong Kong. Bobby receives a subpoena to testify for the prosecution. Pam finally accepts the fact that Mark is dead. Due to the building pressures at home, Donna tells Miss Ellie that she's decided to move out of her house.
185	24	"The Verdict"	Patrick Duffy	David Paulsen	March 15, 1985	June 5, 1985	173124	22.7/36
Bobby prepares for his trip to L.A. to convince Veronica's sister to testify for Jenna. Ewing 17 has been shut down by the Texas Energy Commission due to the oil seepage into the drinking water. Ray attempts to convince Donna to come home. Veronica's sister gives Bobby a letter to read in court. J.R. welcomes Sue Ellen home, but realizes things are still strained between them. Jenna is found innocent of murder, but guilty of manslaughter.
186	25	"Sentences"	Michael Preece	Arthur Bernard Lewis	March 29, 1985	June 12, 1985	173125	23.0/37
Bobby vows to get Jenna out of jail. J.R. blackmails a member of the Texas Energy Commission to guarantee his future cooperation with them. Cliff and Jamie admit their mutual attraction. When Jenna is sentenced to seven years, Bobby comes forward and says he's Charlie's father to prevent her from becoming a ward of the state. Sue Ellen is humiliated by J.R.'s public flaunting of his affair with Mandy. Sue Ellen threatens to divorce J.R.. J.R. tells an upset Pam that Bobby claimed to be Charlie's father as a precautionary measure. Cliff is furious when he learns that his Tract 340 has been shut down due to leakages. Jenna tells Bobby she wants him to be free.
187	26	"Terms of Estrangement"	Alexander Singer	Peter Dunne	April 12, 1985	June 19, 1985	173126	22.1/36
J.R. plans to reunite Pam and Bobby, hoping that she would no longer side with Cliff in the fight against Ewing Oil. J.R. is upset when he sees Mandy giving her phone number to someone. While viewing a tape from Veronica's flight, Bobby, Ray and Norman notice a man putting drugs in her drink. J.R. agrees to meet a man who says he has valuable information about the Ewing Oil lawsuit, but he wants 10 percent of Ewing Oil in return for the information. J.R. insults Sue Ellen which only makes her more determined to survive in the marriage. Cliff gives Jamie an engagement ring. Lucy receives an answer to her letter from Mitch. Jenna's case is re-opened. Jamie's brother Jack comes to Dallas.
188	27	"The Ewing Connection"	Nick Havinga	Arthur Bernard Lewis	April 19, 1985	June 26, 1985	173127	21.1/35
J.R. presents the deal to be made with Jack to Bobby and Ray. If his information is valid, Bobby and J.R. will split Jack's request for 10 percent of Ewing Oil. Lucy is excited about her visit to see Mitch. Jack reveals himself to J.R., Bobby and Ray as Jason's son. Donna tells Miss Ellie that divorce is the only answer for her and Ray. John Ross stays home from school with a slight temperature. Later, when he passes out, Ray, Clayton and Miss Ellie rush him to the hospital. The diagnosis is appendicitis. J.R. verbally abuses Sue Ellen for being a bad mother and she turns to her alcohol for comfort.
189	28	"Deeds and Misdeeds"	Michael Preece	David Paulsen	May 3, 1985	July 3, 1985	173128	21.4/36
J.R. is secretly pleased that Sue Ellen is drinking again.Donna finds out she is pregnant. Pam loans Cliff money when he has a cash flow problem after his wells are shut down. J.R. assures Mandy that Sue Ellen will soon be out of his life and Southfork. Jack tells the Ewings that a man named Windham can verify that Cliff and Jamie have no legal claim to Ewing Oil. Cliff and Jamie are married by a Justice of the Peace. Lucy and Mitch reflect on why their marriage failed. Donna doesn't get the chance to tell Ray that she's pregnant.
190	29	"Deliverance"	Nick Havinga	Peter Dunne	May 10, 1985	July 10, 1985	173129	22.6/38
Bobby and a police detective interrogate the uncooperative hit man who maintains his innocence. J.R. deliberately fuels Cliff's determination to proceed with the lawsuit. Cliff suspects that J.R. and Jack are working together. Pam and Bobby declare their love for each other. Donna and Ray have another fight and she doesn't tell him that she's pregnant. Bobby formulates a plan to make the killer confess. Mitch asks Lucy to move in with him. A decision is rendered regarding Ewing Oil. J.R. wants to institutionalize Sue Ellen for her drinking problem.
191	30	"Swan Song"	Leonard Katzman	Leonard Katzman	May 17, 1985	July 17, 1985	173130	27.5/46
Sue Ellen gets drunk at the Ewing victory party. Donna tells Ray about her pregnancy. J.R. reassures Mandy that the problem with Sue Ellen will be resolved. Bobby is confused about who he should marry. Sue Ellen assures Clayton and Miss Ellie that she has stopped drinking. Mitch and Lucy re-marry. Cliff considers an annulment of his marriage to Jamie. Dusty re-appears. J.R. asks Sue Ellen to agree to end their marriage. Bobby proposes to Pam, and she accepts. Jamie surprises Cliff during their conversation about an annulment. As Bobby leaves Pam's house, a car drives straight towards her; Bobby pushes Pam out of the way and the car hits him; the car crashes and the driver is revealed to be Katherine Wentworth, who is dead. With Pam, Jenna, J.R., Miss Ellie, Clayton, Ray and Donna at his hospital bedside, Bobby dies of massive internal injuries.
