= Dallas season 7 =

Dallas
- Season 7
- DVD cover
- No. of episodes: 30

Release
- Original network: CBS
- Original release: September 30, 1983 – May 18, 1984

Season chronology
- ← Previous; Season 6 Next → Season 8

The seventh season of the television series Dallas aired on CBS during the 1983–84 TV season.

== Cast ==
=== Starring ===
In alphabetical order:

- Barbara Bel Geddes as Miss Ellie Ewing Farlow (19 episodes)
- Patrick Duffy as Bobby Ewing (30 episodes)
- Linda Gray as Sue Ellen Ewing (30 episodes)
- Larry Hagman as J. R. Ewing (30 episodes)
- Susan Howard as Donna Culver Krebbs (28 episodes)
- Steve Kanaly as Ray Krebbs (28 episodes)
- Ken Kercheval as Cliff Barnes (30 episodes)
- Victoria Principal as Pamela Barnes Ewing (30 episodes)
- Charlene Tilton as Lucy Ewing Cooper (29 episodes)

=== Also starring ===
- Morgan Brittany as Katherine Wentworth (29 episodes)
- John Beck as Mark Graison (26 episodes)
- Audrey Landers as Afton Cooper (25 episodes)
- Priscilla Beaulieu Presley as Jenna Wade (24 episodes), billed under "Guest star" status for her first seven episodes
- Howard Keel as Clayton Farlow (22 episodes)
- Timothy Patrick Murphy as Mickey Trotter (6 episodes)

=== Special guest star ===
- Christopher Atkins as Peter Richards (27 episodes)

=== Notable guest stars ===
Omri Katz joins the supporting cast as the second actor to play John Ross Ewing III, and Alexis Smith (Lady Jessica Montford), Glenn Corbett (Paul Morgan), Barry Jenner (Dr. Jerry Kenderson), Martin E. Brooks (Edgar Randolph), Daniel Pilon (Naldo Marchetta), Bill Morey (Leo Wakefield), Shalane McCall (Charlie Wade), Pat Colbert (Oil Baron's Club hostess Dora Mae), Anne Lucas (Oil Baron's Club waitress Cassie) Marina Rice (Pam's maid Angela), and Tony Garcia (the longest serving actor to portray Southfork servant Raoul) are also added. Barry Corbin also appears again for one episode as Sheriff Fenton Washburn.

== Crew ==
The number of writers employed on this season is dramatically decreased from previously, with only three active writers throughout the season: showrunner Leonard Katzman, and longtime Dallas writers Arthur Bernard Lewis and David Paulsen.

The production team remains the same for the third consecutive year: Philip Capice serves as executive producer, Katzman as producer, Cliff Fenneman as associate producer, and writer Arthur Bernard Lewis as supervising producer. Additionally, writer David Paulsen continues as story editor.

== DVD release ==
Dallas' season seven was released by Warner Bros. Home Video, on a Region 1 DVD box set of five double-sided DVDs, on July 31, 2007. In addition to the 30 episodes, it also includes the featurette "The Music of Dallas".

== Episodes ==
No. overall	No. in season	Title	Directed by	Written by	Original U.S. air date	Original U.K. air date	Prod. code	Rating/share (households)
132	1	"The Road Back"	Nick Havinga	Arthur Bernard Lewis	September 30, 1983	October 25, 1983	172101	27.5/44
Bobby saves J.R., Ray, Sue Ellen and John Ross from the Southfork fire. The problems that Bobby has faced because of the fire brings him and Pam together again. Sue Ellen overhears an argument between Pam and J.R. and discovers that she wasn't solely responsible for the car crash that injured Mickey. Sue Ellen tells Clayton she's off the bottle as she no longer feels guilty and decides to devote her life to raising John Ross. Ray continues to blame J.R. for Mickey's ordeal. J.R. points out that he, Bobby and Ray share the responsibility as Bobby and Ray set up the sting operation that sent Driscoll to jail, thereby helping to create the situation that made Driscoll go after J.R.. Harv Smithfield explains to J.R. and Bobby that the fight for Ewing Oil cannot end until the final audit is done according to Jock's will. At that time, one of the brothers will own 51% of the company.
133	2	"The Long Goodbye"	Leonard Katzman	Leonard Katzman	October 7, 1983	November 1, 1983	172102	23.7/28
Sue Ellen tells J.R. that she wants an open marriage, with separate bedrooms at Southfork. Bobby asks Pam to come back to him, but he is faced with having to choose between protecting Miss Ellie or preserving his marriage as Pam says she could never live at Southfork again. J.R. and Katherine are both furious about the possible reconciliation of Bobby and Pam. J.R. tells Pam that he will do everything in his power to hurt Bobby and destroy Cliff if Pam revives her marriage. Mickey is depressed when the doctor says he'll be paralysed for life.
134	3	"The Letter"	Nick Havinga	David Paulsen	October 14, 1983	November 8, 1983	172103	21.6/35
J.R. plants the seed of Pam's destruction with Katherine, who will go to any lengths to try to win Bobby. When Katherine can't talk Pam out of going back to Bobby, she decides to fake a letter from Pam about Mark which would throw a new light on a reconciliation. The letter has the effect Katherine intends. Pam meets Bobby for a date only to discover that Bobby now wants out of their marriage. John Ross becomes withdrawn due to his parents fighting, the fire at Southfork, and is taken to see a psychologist, which irritates J.R., but eventually agrees with it. At the day camp, John Ross meets his counselor, Peter Richards.
135	4	"My Brother's Keeper"	Leonard Katzman	Arthur Bernard Lewis	October 21, 1983	November 15, 1983	172104	25.3/41
J.R. and Katherine arrange it so that Pam sees Bobby with an attractive woman at a restaurant. Afton tells Pam that Katherine must have set up the whole thing, as there are too many restaurants in Dallas for it to be a coincidence. J.R. pays off a driller for having sabotaged Bobby's Canadian oil wells. J.R. later tells a hooker, Serena, that he has no intention of dividing the company with Bobby when the final audit comes through. Lucy tells Mickey that she loves him despite his paralysis and will stand by him and see he doesn't give up on himself. Pam and Bobby's divorce is made final by a judge in court. Pam is present, but Bobby is not.
136	5	"The Quality of Mercy"	Nick Havinga	Leonard Katzman	October 28, 1983	November 22, 1983	172105	24.0/40
Pam moves into her mother's house and indicates to Mark that he will be the new man in her life. Meanwhile, Bobby feels lonely and accepts an invitation from Katherine for dinner. Cliff blackmails Sly into spying on J.R. by promising to arrange an early parole release for her brother, Steve, who is serving a jail sentence for breaking and entering. Lucy confesses to Sue Ellen that she sometimes has doubts about whether she could spend the rest of her life with Mickey. But when she hears that Mickey no longer wants to see her, she bursts into his hospital room and loudly berates him and tells him that she loves him. Soon after, Mickey goes into a coma and is put on a life support machine. Ray takes Mickey's life into his own hands and unplugs the life support machine.
137	6	"Check and Mate"	Leonard Katzman	David Paulsen	November 4, 1983	November 29, 1983	172106	26.8/41
Ray is arrested for murdering Mickey and is taken to the police station where he is later visited by Donna and Bobby. Ray tells Donna that he doesn't need a lawyer as he did what he's accused of. But eventually he reluctantly agrees to Donna's pleas to get Paul Morgan to represent him. Both Lil and Lucy are in states of shock. Cliff urges Sly to continue spying on J.R. if he wants her to help her brother get his parole. He is ecstatic about scooping J.R. through Sly's information on the Murphy deal. Katherine rebuffs J.R.'s pass, and tells him that she's in love with Bobby. Sue Ellen begins to suspect that Peter, John Ross' counsellor, has a crush on her. Unexpected developments in the course of the final audit meeting bear significantly on the outcome, as the J.R./Bobby contest officially concludes with the announcement of who will control Ewing Oil.
138	7	"Ray's Trial"	Michael Preece	Arthur Bernard Lewis	November 11, 1983	December 6, 1983	172107	26.7/41
J.R. drowns his disappointment at having lost the battle for Ewing Oil. But the cartel agrees to think about his proposal to do business with him again. Meanwhile, Bobby meets an old girlfriend, Jenna Wade, who is working at Billy Bobs, and offers to drive her home. Jenna refuses Bobby's invitation as she does not want to get involved and hurt again. Bobby shows up at Pam's to pick up Christopher, where he apologises to Katherine for breaking their dinner date. Pam is more upset to hear that he was with Jenna. Ray's trial begins and three doctors, Lucy and Bobby testify. Lil is called to the stand but Ray leaps to his feet and objects strongly.
139	8	"The Oil Baron's Ball"	Leonard Katzman	Leonard Katzman	November 18, 1983	December 13, 1983	172108	27.5/43
In the courtroom, Lil admits that she asked Ray to pull out the plug of Mickey's life support system. But the judge still declares Ray guilty and passes sentence on him. Sue Ellen and J.R. make love once more, but afterwards, J.R. complains that he is being used merely as a stud. At the Oil Baron's Ball, neither Bobby nor Pam are pleased to see each other with their respective dates. Lucy goes to the Ball with John Ross's councellor Peter Richards. Later in the ladies room, there is a confrontation between Pam and Jenna with Katherine fueling the attack. Cliff is made Oil Man of the Year and on his way up to collect the award he tells J.R. that he plans to tell the true story about Jock Ewing and Digger Barnes. J.R. starts to rise from his seat.
140	9	"Morning After"	Michael Preece	David Paulsen	November 25, 1983	December 20, 1983	172109	25.3/40
Cliff announces on the podium at the Oil Baron's Ball that Digger deserved the acclaim that Jock has received as it was he that found the oil that the Ewings have been taking from the ground since. When Cliff steps down, an all-out fight starts with fists and food flying and Bobby, Mark, Ray, J.R., Cliff and Peter all participating. Jenna treats Bobby's wounds and they stay the entire night together, but do not have sex. Pam starts work at Barnes-Wentworth Oil but demands that the Barnes/Ewing feud must end. Pam and Cliff buy a new oil service company, but Pam feels that Cliff used her sex appeal to clinch the deal with Mr. Kesey. Sue Ellen and Peter have a private talk about their relationship and Sue Ellen says that nothing could happen between them for many reasons and pleads with Peter to continue seeing John Ross as his counsellor. But the next day, Peter is not at the camp. When Sue Ellen tracks him down, she insists that they must talk some more and, without warning, Peter suddenly kisses her.
141	10	"The Buck Stops Here"	Leonard Katzman	Arthur Bernard Lewis	December 2, 1983	December 27, 1983	172110	26.6/42
Sue Ellen and J.R. have a heated argument about Sue Ellen's relationship with Peter. Pam is annoyed when she discovers that Bobby, Jenna, Christopher and Charlie spent the day together. Mark angerily tells Pam he going to the rodeo and if she does not want to go she can stay at home. J.R. is determined to discover who is double-crossing him on his business deals. Katherine offers to set Jenna up for life in Houston, but Jenna refuses and tells Bobby that Katherine wants him. Bobby, Ray and Mark all participate at the rodeo. Afterwards, Tracy asks Mark to dance and Bobby and Pam dance. They each feel the tension and pain of the strong feelings they still have for each other but say nothing. Jenna feels jealous and reciprocates by giving Bobby a deep kiss in public after her ride on the mechanical bull. Pam then takes Mark and leaves. They go home and spend the night together for the first time.
142	11	"To Catch a Sly"	Michael Preece	David Paulsen	December 9, 1983	January 3, 1984	172111	27.3/42
Pam feels disturbed after her night with Mark because she still feels more attached to Bobby. When Bobby arrives to pick up Christopher, they talk about their relationship. Bobby becomes very depressed when he discovers that Pam has slept with Mark. J.R. asks Detective McSween to have all the phones in his and Cliff's office tapped. But it is J.R. himself that cleverly maneuvers Cliff out of his office and puts the electronic bug on Cliff's phone. J.R. then discovers that the spy is Sly and presents her with photos of Cliff and her together. He tells Sly that the information she will be passing on to Cliff will now be controlled by him. Sue Ellen tells Peter that they can't be friends because she is obviously too attracted to him.
143	12	"Barbecue Four"	Leonard Katzman	Arthur Bernard Lewis	December 16, 1983	January 10, 1984	172112	25.8/41
J.R. sets Cliff up through Sly when he passes on the Travis Boyd deal to Cliff. Sly discovers that Cliff had nothing to do with her brother's parole, so J.R. suggests that Sly ask Cliff for money. Cliff agrees to support her while she takes care of her brother. Jenna refuses Bobby's plea to give up her job, but accepts a dinner invitation at Southfork. At dinner, Miss Ellie and Clayton pay a surprise visit. J.R. is furious as Clayton sits down to eat in his daddy's chair. J.R. begins to form a deal by devious means with a government official called Edgar Randolph. At the annual Ewing barbecue, Pam tells Miss Ellie she still loves Bobby. Mark and Bobby call a tenuous truce. Sue Ellen and Peter kiss passionately behind one of the barns. Meanwhile in Rome, Katherine is disappointed to discover that Charlie's birth certificate names Bobby as the father. As the guests start to leave the barbecue, Clayton announces that he and Miss Ellie are engaged. J.R. is furious over the news.
144	13	"Past Imperfect"	Larry Hagman	David Paulsen	December 23, 1983	January 17, 1984	172113	24.8/41
Clayton's announcement of his impending marriage to Miss Ellie brings more than congratulations. Ellie refuses the diamond until the "problems" are worked out, including Clayton's suggestion that Ellie leave Southfork. Cliff, taking J.R.'s bait unknowingly, wants more information on Randolph, a government offshore oil leasing agent. Not wanting to be a kept woman, Jenna shows her independence by storming out when Bobby announces that he has just bought her the boutique they are visiting. Katherine investigates Jenna's past. J.R. hits a sore spot when wind of his digging into Clayton's past gets out. Sue Ellen discovers that Peter has left school.
145	14	"Peter's Principles"	Patrick Duffy	Arthur Bernard Lewis	January 6, 1984	January 24, 1984	172114	25.4/39
Sue Ellen's worry grows as Peter decides to leave school. She agrees to see him if that will keep him in school and in town. Cliff's proposal for a joint venture in offshore drilling to Jordan and Marilee goes unheeded. J.R.'s digging makes Clayton uncomfortable to the point he brings it up to Ellie. J.R. doesn't stop though and brings up Clayton's little-known sister at family cocktails. After seeing Cliff and Marilee, Afton runs to Pam for comfort. Pam, worried that Cliff's obsession with becoming an oil tycoon may start the family feud again, arranges to meet with Bobby to discuss it. Mark and Jenna think a lot more than business discussions are going on.
146	15	"Offshore Crude"	Ray Danton	David Paulsen	January 13, 1984	January 31, 1984	172115	24.2/36
Bobby and J.R. talk about Cliff's desire to compete with the Ewings and J.R. is amused, saying he is not interested in competing with Cliff. Sue Ellen tells John Ross she has found Peter. J.R. confronts Sue Ellen and she reminds him they have an open marriage. Sue Ellen tries to avoid seeing Peter, but ends up spending the day at Southfork with him and making arrangements to meet him later. J.R. slips information to Cliff through Sly that he will go into the offshore bidding alone. J.R. offers a bribe to Randolph in exchange for information about the bids. Cliff is ecstatic with the news that J.R. will enter the bidding alone if need be. He tries to convince Marilee to invest with him.
147	16	"Some Do... Some Don't"	Larry Hagman	Leonard Katzman	January 20, 1984	February 7, 1984	172116	26.2/40
Peter is able to talk Sue Ellen out of breaking off their affair, but when she is mistaken for his mother, her resolve becomes firmer. J.R. wants to have another child, which Sue Ellen refuses to do. Miss Ellie and Clayton talk about their recent trip and upcoming marriage, then they have a serious misunderstanding. Bobby wants to buy another company against J.R.'s advice. Sly again sets Cliff up. He backs off the offshore deal after Pam tells him about Marilee. Bobby and Jenna reach an agreement, even as Katherine works on Bobby and J.R. works on her. Mark mysteriously goes into the hospital.
148	17	"Eye of the Beholder"	Leonard Katzman	Leonard Katzman	January 27, 1984	February 21, 1984	172117	26.3/41
Bobby and Jenna spend the night together. Clayton confronts Miss Ellie on her brutal treatment the night before, but she insists there is nothing to discuss and tells him to leave. J.R. is shocked that Bobby went through with the Boyd deal, but decides to sign to keep the peace. Peter agrees to go to a party with Lucy, and when he comes to pick her up, Sue Ellen runs into him and is shaken. When Afton leaves to see her brother, Cliff arranges a rendezvous with Marilee. Ellie's decision not to marry Clayton pleases J.R., but he still continues digging into his past. Pam and Bobby meet for lunch after Mark cancels. Cliff gets financial information that verifies that the Ewings could invest in offshore. J.R. pushes Randolph to "unseal" the bids and reveal the information on the top bidder.
149	18	"Twelve Mile Limit"	Patrick Duffy	David Paulsen	February 3, 1984	February 28, 1984	172118	26.7/41
J.R. arranges to sell his geologist's reports on offshore tracts to Cliff, who reluctantly spends the money for them after Marilee makes it a condition for going in with him on the venture. Miss Ellie and Clayton both admit, but not to each other, that they are frightened of the intimacies their upcoming marriage will entail. J.R. gets additional reports on Clayton's past and uses Sue Ellen to substantiate them. Donna and Ray discover Randolph unconscious from an overdose of alcohol and pills. They accuse J.R. of driving him to suicide. J.R. tells Randolph that his death will not eliminate humiliation for his family. Katherine continues to try to get a line on Jenna and is distressed when she discovers that Jenna and Bobby are intimately involved. Mark asks Pam to marry him.
150	19	"Where Is Poppa?"	William F. Claxton	Arthur Bernard Lewis	February 10, 1984	March 6, 1984	172119	25.3/28
J.R. rushes to the hospital where Sue Ellen was taken in an unconscious condition after a minor accident in front of Jenna's boutique. Sue Ellen had earlier agreed to play J.R.'s loving wife at the Andersons' anniversary party. Sue Ellen miscarries a baby she didn't know she was having. Marilee agrees to a partnership with Cliff as long as the other members of the cartel don't know about it. Cliff forms a grudging respect for J.R. after discovering that his adversary had gotten information on the offshore tracts. Bobby wants Clayton to become a greater part of the family by going into offshore drilling with him. J.R. continues to harass Katherine knowing she enjoys dangerous relationships.
151	20	"When the Bough Breaks"	Nick Havinga	Leonard Katzman	February 17, 1984	March 13, 1984	172120	26.0/41
J.R. and Peter are each convinced that they fathered the child Sue Ellen lost in the accident. Bobby is having his own doubts about Charlie's parentage and realises that the subject is hanging between him and Jenna. Katherine tracks down Naldo Marchetta, Jenna's ex-husband, and pays him to confirm her suspicions about Jenna. J.R. makes Marilee have second thoughts about becoming Cliff's partner. Clayton bows out of the offshore venture with the Ewings. Mark pushes Pam for an answer to his marriage proposal. Sue Ellen tells Peter that it's over between them.
152	21	"True Confessions"	Paul Krasny	David Paulsen	February 24, 1984	March 20, 1984	172121	26.1/40
Katherine sets up a confrontation between Naldo, Jenna and Bobby about Charlie, but is not pleased with the results and Naldo's predictions. Ray and Donna look into Randolph's past and discover the secret which J.R. is using to blackmail him. Lucy asks Peter to model with her at Southfork. J.R. gets Marilee to agree to pulling out of her deal with Cliff after the winner is declared for the offshore oil leases.
153	22	"And the Winner Is..."	Nick Havinga	Arthur Bernard Lewis	March 2, 1984	March 27, 1984	172122	25.7/41
Cliff has been set up again by J.R. and his spy, Sly, and is befuddled after the bids are opened for leases on the offshore tracts: he has offered millions over J.R.'s surprisingly low bid. Randolph confesses to Ray and Donna that he gave J.R. information, which confuses them when it seems J.R. did not use the knowledge to win the leases. Miss Ellie wants a small wedding with just family and close friends, but Clayton is upset that his sister Jessica has been invited. Katherine realises that she may have outsmarted herself by getting Jenna out of Bobby's life. J.R. overhears an incriminating conversation between Sue Ellen and Peter.
154	23	"Fools Rush In"	Michael Preece	David Paulsen	March 9, 1984	April 3, 1984	172123	26.8/42
Cliff learns he must raise $260 million to complete his offshore drilling obligations. Over Afton's objections, Cliff goes to Vaughn Leland for the huge loan unaware that J.R. and Leland are conspiring against him. J.R. also plots to get Katherine married to Bobby. Miss Ellie invites Clayton's sister, Jessica, to stay at Southfork for the upcoming wedding. Charlie goes to Bobby upset over his split with her mother. J.R. hires Peter to be John Ross' private counselor; at the same time, he is having his background investigated. Pam discovers some alarming information about Mark.
155	24	"The Unexpected"	Nick Havinga	Arthur Bernard Lewis	March 16, 1984	April 10, 1984	172124	24.4/39
J.R. is especially impressed by Jessica and her present to him; her late husband's regimental sword. Ellie's hospitality appears to be wasted on both Jessica and Clayton. J.R. and Vaughn trap Cliff into signing loan papers that have the potential to destroy him. Pam makes the decision to marry Mark out of pity when she learns he's sick. A triumphant Katherine demands that J.R. give her the tapes which he has been using to blackmail her. Bobby is unable to wish Pam luck and admits to Jenna how he is torn between his feelings for Pam and his need to hold onto her and Charlie. J.R. continues with his plan to destroy Peter and teach a lesson to Sue Ellen.
156	25	"Strange Alliance"	Larry Hagman	Leonard Katzman	March 23, 1984	April 17, 1984	172125	26.0/41
J.R. and Jessica find they share the same sentiments about Ellie and Clayton's wedding plans. J.R. tells Sue Ellen that he will be happy when Clayton joins the family, but Sue Ellen is doubtful of his sincerity. Lucy's determination to find out why Peter is not interested in her makes Sue Ellen apprehensive. Pam is frightened that her marriage to Mark will make her lose Bobby forever, even as she tries to shield Mark from finding out the truth about his health. Bobby is finally able to wish Pam and Mark happiness. However, his own future is clouded as Jenna tells him she will not wait forever for him. Sly continues to lead Cliff on and J.R. has Vaughn to put Cliff farther out on a financial limb. J.R. makes plans to frame Peter.
157	26	"Blow Up"	Patrick Duffy	David Paulsen	April 6, 1984	April 24, 1984	172126	26.3/43
Mark is so proud of Pam that he wants all his friends to witness their wedding. Pam is concerned about his health. J.R. and Jessica conspire to sabotage Miss Ellie and Clayton's wedding. Jenna and Bobby agree to try a fresh start. J.R. tries to buy Wentworth oil fields from Katherine, but she offers to sell to Bobby instead. Cliff's wells keep coming in dry and he can't understand why he needs to put up so much collateral to borrow more money. He tries to turn to Mark for help but Pam won't let him. J.R. decides its time to put the screws on Peter after Sue Ellen has a nasty scene with a drunken Lucy. Donna becomes suspicious of Jessica.
158	27	"Turning Point"	Gwen Arner	Arthur Bernard Lewis	April 13, 1984	May 1, 1984	172127	24.9/41
Clayton tries to stop his sister from conspiring with J.R., to no avail. Pam finally gives in to Mark and agrees to a big wedding. J.R. is furious with Katherine for dealing with Bobby on the sale of some Wentworth properties. Afton realises that Cliff is in big trouble when he tries to rifle her bank account. Cliff has to sell off some of his assets to get cash for his drilling without knowing that J.R. is the buyer and is pulling strings in the background. J.R. gets Peter arrested when cocaine is found in his car by the police. Jessica has an unusual reaction to Clayton's friendship with Ray.
159	28	"Love Stories"	Michael Preece	Leonard Katzman	May 4, 1984	May 8, 1984	172128	23.8/40
Bobby proposes marriage to Jenna and she accepts. J.R. sets Katherine up and she confesses her affair with J.R. to Bobby, who recognises her deceit. J.R. pretends he is concerned over Peter's arrest. Jessica attacks Clayton for selling the Southern Cross and leaving Dusty without a heritage. Cliff realises he is about to lose everything he owns. Mark discovers the truth about his health. Clayton pushes Miss Ellie to marry before J.R. and Jessica can interfere.
160	29	"Hush, Hush, Sweet Jessie"	Gwen Arner	David Paulsen	May 11, 1984	May 15, 1984	172129	24.4/43
J.R.'s snooping into Clayton and Jessica's past makes him realise that his mother may be in grave and immediate danger. The concern of the Ewings for Miss Ellie's safety increases after it is learned that she never arrived at a fashion show she was to attend with Jessica and Donna. Mark's death affects the Ewings in a variety of ways and Bobby and Jenna face Pam's need for Bobby's help. Katherine buys Cliff's share of Wentworth Tool & Die so he can continue his offshore drilling. Pam discovers Katherine's duplicity in her relationship with Bobby. Clayton makes a shocking revelation about Dusty's real mother. The Ewings fear Ellie is in serious trouble when Donna arrives to inform that she was attacked by Jessica and Ellie has been kidnapped by her.
161	30	"End Game"	Leonard Katzman	Arthur Bernard Lewis	May 18, 1984	May 22, 1984	172130	26.0/45
Tensions rise at Southfork as the search for Miss Ellie and Jessica continues. Bobby confronts J.R. over his plotting with Jessica to stop the wedding. Cliff seeks Jordan Lee's help in getting another crew for his offshore drilling. Ellie is rescued from Jessica's clutches. Pam learns that Jenna and Bobby will be getting married and she leaves Dallas with Christopher without telling anyone where she is going. Clayton and Miss Ellie marry and go on a Mediterranean cruise for their honeymoon. Katherine has an angry confrontation with Bobby after he rejects her again. J.R. reveals to Cliff that he set him up and that he is about to lose everything. Cliff gets drunk and Afton walks out of the apartment and he vows revenge against J.R. Donna receives a call that Edgar Randolph is back in Dallas looking to settle his score with J.R. After revealing his scheme to frame Peter, J.R. blackmails Sue Ellen into moving back into his bedroom but a furious Peter threatens to kill him. Cliff finally strikes oil on his offshore tract but he can't be found to be told the news. At night, an unknown assailant walks into the Ewing Oil offices and fires three bullets into the back of J.R.'s chair; but it's Bobby who has been shot...
