= Dallas season 10 =

Dallas
- Season 10
- DVD cover
- No. of episodes: 29

Release
- Original network: CBS
- Original release: September 26, 1986 – May 15, 1987

Season chronology
- ← Previous; Season 9 Next → Season 11

The tenth season of the television series Dallas aired on CBS during the 1986–87 TV season.

== Cast ==
=== Starring ===
In alphabetical order:

- Barbara Bel Geddes as Miss Ellie Ewing Farlow (28 episodes)
- Patrick Duffy as Bobby Ewing (29 episodes)
- Linda Gray as Sue Ellen Ewing (29 episodes)
- Larry Hagman as J. R. Ewing (29 episodes)
- Susan Howard as Donna Culver Krebbs (29 episodes)
- Steve Kanaly as Ray Krebbs (29 episodes)
- Howard Keel as Clayton Farlow (29 episodes)
- Ken Kercheval as Cliff Barnes (29 episodes)
- Priscilla Beaulieu Presley as Jenna Wade (24 episodes)
- Victoria Principal as Pamela Barnes Ewing (29 episodes)
- Dack Rambo as Jack Ewing (15 episodes), erroneously uncredited for Episode 9

=== Also starring ===
- Sheree J. Wilson as April Stevens (24 episodes)
- Deborah Shelton as Mandy Winger (15 episodes)
- Steve Forrest as Wes Parmalee (12 episodes)
- Jenilee Harrison as Jamie Ewing Barnes (12 episodes)

=== Special guest star ===
- Stephen Elliott as Scotty Demarest (2 episodes)

=== Notable guest stars ===
Longtime major guest star William Smithers (Jeremy Wendell) continues to appear, and Derek McGrath (Oswald Valentine) and Jonathan Goldsmith (Bruce Harvey) both join the cast.

Additionally, Hunter von Leer (B.D. Calhoun), J.A. Preston (Leo Daltry), Jim McMullan (Andrew Dowling), Josef Rainer (Mr. Barton), Karen Carlson (Nancy Scotfield) and Frederick Coffin (Alfred Simpson) all join the series for major story arcs, although they won't return for later seasons.

== Crew ==
For the second year in a row, Dallas' creative team goes through major changes for season 10. Only associate producer Cliff Fenneman survives the transition from season 9 to season 10. Former writer/story editor David Paulsen replaces James H. Brown as producer and newcomer Calvin Clements, Jr. is appointed supervising producer. Former producer (to the end of season 8) Leonard Katzman returns as showrunner, but now promoted to executive producer, replacing veteran Philip Capice. Katzman's son Mitchell Wayne Katzman joins the team as the new story editor. Leah Markus, who wrote for season 4, joins as story consultant.

Writers for the season include Leonard Katzman, David Paulsen, Leah Markus, Mitchell Wayne Katzman, Calvin Clements, Jr., and Louella Lee Caraway. Series star Susan Howard also writes one more episode before leaving the series, both as a writer and as an actress, at the end of the season.

== DVD release ==
Season ten of Dallas was released by Warner Bros. Home Video, on a Region 1 DVD box set of three double-sided DVDs, on January 13, 2009. Unlike the previous Dallas DVD box sets (but like the subsequent) it does not include any extras, besides the 29 episodes.

== Episodes ==
No. overall	No. in season	Title	Directed by	Written by	Original U.S. air date	Original U.K. air date	Prod. code	Rating/share (households)
223	1	"Return to Camelot"	Leonard Katzman	Leonard Katzman & Mitchell Wayne Katzman	September 26, 1986	October 22, 1986	175101	26.5/44
224	2	"Return to Camelot"	Leonard Katzman	Leonard Katzman & Mitchell Wayne Katzman	September 26, 1986	October 22, 1986	175101	26.5/44
Pam finds Bobby in the shower; his death and all the events of the previous season are revealed as Pam's dream. Prices of oil are sinking because OPEC is exporting much cheap oil to the country. Ewing Oil and the other companies have to shut down some smaller wells. Bobby tells both Jenna and Charlie that he is going to marry Pam again. J.R. and Cliff are both quite unhappy with that. Cliff presented to the cartel an idea about creating a lobbying group in D.C. to enforce higher taxes on imported oil. He said the idea was his, but in fact, it was Jamie's. J.R. offers Jack to buy off his 10% of Ewing Oil. Ray bought a new house for him and Donna, but she didn't like the idea of them getting back together even though she still loves him. J.R. offers to Donna a head position of the lobbyist group and she agreed. One of Ewing 12 wells was blown up. Jenna and Charlie move out of Southfork into a house in Braddock. Ray and Clayton hired a new ranch foreman, Wes Parmalee. The fire at Ewing 12 is controlled and the field is shut down. Mandy and Sue Ellen meet. Sue Ellen swore to herself never to drink again and she hired a man to stalk Mandy and J.R. Wes has a picture of young Miss Ellie.
225	3	"Pari Per Sue"	Michael Preece	David Paulsen	October 3, 1986	October 29, 1986	175102	21.6/34
Jeremy Wendell offers to buy Ewing Oil, J.R. and Bobby decline the offer. J.R. argued with Jack and almost kicked him out of the visit at Southfork. Mandy is scared, as she noticed the man Sue Ellen hired and she thinks he is trying to kill her. Cliff wants to buy Jack's share of Ewing Oil. Sue Ellen bought a Valentines Lingerie Shop with the owner Mr Valentine getting 10%.
226	4	"Once and Future King"	Leonard Katzman	Calvin Clements, Jr.	October 10, 1986	November 5, 1986	175103	19.5/32
Cliff is not satisfied with Donna as the head of the group and he tries to get a man on her position, but Bobby stands up for her and convinced the other oilmen to do the same thing. Cliff gives Jack a check for $500,000 to make sure that if he one day decides to sell his share of Ewing Oil, Cliff would be the first to buy it. Sue Ellen is starting a campaign for her Valentine Lingerie Shop and wants to hire Mandy to model for her. Cliff and Jamie had one of their fights again. The wife of the man who blew up one of the wells came to Bobby begging him to stop the trial against him. Miss Ellie has a feeling that she and Wes met before. Donna left for D.C.. Pamela convinced Bobby to talk to the man who blew up the wells, but when they arrive to the town, he was found dead in jail. J.R. found out about the private detective. Miss Ellie came to Wes' bunkhouse and found Jock's buckle, knife and letters within Wes' things. He told her that those things always belonged to him, hinting he's Jock.
227	5	"Enigma"	Michael Preece	Leah Markus	October 17, 1986	November 12, 1986	175104	22.1/36
Miss Ellie orders Wes off of Southfork and rejects his claims. Ray tracks Wes down, looking for answers. Miss Ellie reveals Wes' story to Jock's closest friend Punk Anderson. J.R., furious with Sue Ellen for having him and Mandy followed, offers her a divorce. J.R. and Mandy fall unwittingly into Sue Ellen's plot as her Lingerie Company employs a sexy model. J.R. and Bobby are shocked when they turn to the Cattlemen's Bank for a multimillion dollar loan. Donna is in Washington, lobbying to assist the oil industry. She is puzzled when she calls Ray and Jenna answers the phone. J.R. continues trying to raise the price of oil.
228	6	"Trompe L'Oeil"	Leonard Katzman	Leonard Katzman	October 24, 1986	November 19, 1986	175105	20.3/33
Clayton warns Wes that he will fight to keep him off Southfork and away from Ellie. J.R. and Bobby are convinced that Wes' claims are false until he pays them a visit at Ewing Oil. Ellie keeps her mind off of Wes by helping Pam plan her wedding. Sue Ellen's plan to get even with J.R. goes better than she expected. The unexpected arrival of his ex-wife shakes Jack's contemplation of riches from his ten percent share of Ewing Oil. With fifty percent of Ewing Oil as a guarantee, J.R. and Bobby start expanding the business. J.R.'s meeting with B.D. Calhoun leaves him confident that oil prices will rise again.
229	7	"Territorial Imperative"	Michael Preece	David Paulsen	October 31, 1986	November 26, 1986	175106	20.5/33
Sue Ellen's company, Valentine, is a huge success. April meets J.R. who advises her that the 10% of Ewing Oil is not worth that much due to the price slump. Wes visits Ellie at Southfork & tells her things only she and he knows about their second honeymoon. Cliff offers April Stevens to buy Ewing Oil if she manages to get her share off Jack. Pam & Bobby as well as Christopher catch Charlie hanging around with a nasty crowd & by force takes her home. Jenna tells Pam & Bobby to keep out of their lives. Ellie is worried about Wes & tells over lunch Mavis that she senses something about Wes that stops her dismissing him as a hoax. Ray denies to Donna that he is sleeping with Jenna & tells her its none of her business. Donna tells Ray that she still loves him but cannot to return to him into his new home. J.R. is getting annoyed at the attraction Mandy is creating with her new modelling. Sue Ellen visits Wes & offers him help to stay. Jenna gets shocking & upsetting results from her doctor.
230	8	"The Second Time Around"	Leonard Katzman	Calvin Clements, Jr.	November 7, 1986	December 3, 1986	175107	21.6/34
Wes agrees to go under medical investigation. Bobby and Pam's wedding day arrives, with Ray making a startling announcement that Jenna's pregnant with Bobby's baby. Jamie attends the wedding with Jack and is shocked to see Cliff arrive with April. Wes shows up and refuses to leave until Ellie agrees to meet him later.
231	9	"Bells Are Ringing"	Michael Preece	Leah Markus	November 14, 1986	December 10, 1986	175108	23.7/37
Pam and Bobby's bliss is shattered by an outburst from Ray on their wedding day. J.R. uses the outburst as a last attempt to get Jenna to the wedding. Banks' fears over Wes' claim make them freeze Ewing Oil's credit. April plots against Jack. J.R. continues his scheme to raise the price of oil.
232	10	"Who's Who at the Oil Baron's Ball?"	Leonard Katzman	David Paulsen	November 21, 1986	December 17, 1986	175109	21.5/34
Disagreement continue between Miss Ellie and Clayton over Wes Parmalee. Clayton feels he has to fight both Parmalee and Jock's ghost. A Hollywood producer named Bruce Harvey expresses an interest in Mandy Winger. J.R. is concerned about Bobby's situation, with Jenna's baby on the way. The C.I.A. warns J.R. against associating with B.D. Calhoun. Cliff invites April to the Oil Baron's Ball. Ray tells Donna that the fate of Jenna's baby should be entirely her choice. J.R. wants April to sell him 5 percent of Ewing Oil. Cliff wants his $500,000 back from Jack. Parmalee's x-ray offer more surprise for J.R. and Bobby. Pam and Bobby meet April Stevens. Jenna and Ray stay away from the Oil Baron's Ball. At the ball, Parmalee shocks the oil community by claiming he's Jock Ewing. Parmalee agrees to take a lie-detector test. Clayton threatens to kill Parmalee.
233	11	"Proof Positive"	Michael Preece	Calvin Clements, Jr.	November 28, 1986	December 24, 1986	175110	21.1/35
Wes makes a stunning disclosure at the Oil Baron's Ball. After he is confronted by J.R., Clayton, and Bobby, Wes agrees to take a lie detector test in order to prove he is Jock. Ellie requests another secret meeting with Wes. Clayton arrives at a disturbing conclusion. April plots to cash in on her former marriage to Jack. Pam makes an unsettling proposition she wants to buy Jenna's baby. Sue Ellen forces a showdown with J.R. Jamie reaches a decision about her marriage to Cliff. NOTE: The set featured in the test screening for Mandy's film is the set for Mack (Kevin Dobson) and Karen MacKenzie's (Michele Lee) kitchen on spin-off series Knots Landing.
234	12	"Something Old, Something New"	Leonard Katzman	Leah Markus	December 5, 1986	December 31, 1986	175111	21.9/34
With the evidence mounting that Wes Parmalee is really Jock, Bobby leaves for South America in search of information to disprove the claim. Bobby faces the grim duty of retracing Jock's accident in South America. J.R. pressures a confused Miss Ellie to declare Parmalee a fraud. Sue Ellen cashes in on her plot to get back at J.R. and Mandy learns who the benefactor of her good fortune has been. Donna continues her lobbying duties in Washington D.C. J.R. attempts to abort his plan with B.D. Calhoun to raise the price of oil. Miss Ellie reluctantly meets Parmalee for dinner.
235	13	"Bar-B-Cued"	Michael Preece	David Paulsen	December 12, 1986	January 7, 1987	175112	20.8/33
Bobby returns from South America with evidence regarding Wes Parmalee, but it's an unexpected and uninvited guest who provides Miss Ellie with the shocking truth. J.R. and Clayton grow closer as a result of the Parmalee calamity. Pam seals her business deal with Cliff before he is cornered into paying for Jamie's service as oil consultant. Parmalee has interesting encounters with both Jeremy Wendell and April Stevens. J.R. receives reassuring news concerning B.D. Calhoun and the Middle East. Jack gives Jamie an unusual gift. Donna has a brief but intriguing meeting with an important senator in her efforts for the oil lobby. Cliff provides further sparks at the barbecue.
236	14	"The Fire Next Time"	Patrick Duffy	David Paulsen	December 19, 1986	January 14, 1987	175113	21.2/34
An angry Clayton goes on a manhunt. Miss Ellie seeks the aid of her sons in calming her furious husband. J.R., confident that the Middle East situation is at rest, learns some frightening news concerning B.D. Calhoun. Donna returns to Dallas with a decision about her marriage to Ray she hands him divorce papers. Jeremy Wendell approaches Cliff with a devious business proposition
237	15	"So Shall Ye Reap"	Jerry Jameson	Leonard Katzman	January 2, 1987	January 21, 1987	175114	21.8/32
Threatened by B.D. Calhoun's menacing presence, J.R. takes the necessary steps to rid himself of the mercenary. Pam's suspicious investigation into some of Cliff's business "deals" prompts him into reconsidering Jeremy Wendell's proposition. Jenna attempts to sever more ties to Bobby by selling her boutique and giving Bobby a cheque which he tells Pam he going to put in a Trust Fund for Jenna and his baby. April Stevens eyes a fortuitous opportunity when she "accidentally" runs into Ewing Oil nemesis, Jeremy Wendell. Donna decides to move off of Southfork.
238	16	"Tick, Tock"	Patrick Duffy	Mitchell Wayne Katzman	January 9, 1987	January 28, 1987	175115	23.1/36
Sue Ellen is unsuspecting when Calhoun, whom she knows as Peter Duncan, "accidentally" bumps into her and Pam. Ray feels the frustration of losing his wife and his unborn child. Pam's increasing overprotective nature around Christopher concerns Bobby. Jeremy Wendell pursues his plan to ruin Ewing Oil. Ray and Clayton, in an effort to forget their troubles, resume their work together in the horse cutting business.
239	17	"Night Visitor"	Larry Hagman	Calvin Clements, Jr.	January 23, 1987	February 4, 1987	175116	22.3/34
Ewing Oil makes a financial comeback as Bobby and J.R. secure important deals, but J.R. is too overcome with anxiety about B.D. Calhoun to savor the success. Bobby becomes suspicious when J.R. acts overly concerned about Southfork's security system. Cliff reluctantly goes through with Jeremy Wendell's plan to undermine Ewing Oil. April Stevens continues her ploy to get her 5 percent share of the company. Ray and Jenna's friendship is put on hold while he decides to pursue a custody case with Donna for his unborn child, but she is unexpectedly rushed to the hospital in Washington D.C. with excruciating stomach pains. Sue Ellen has another inauspicious run-in with "Peter Duncan".
240	18	"Cat and Mouse"	Michael Preece	Leah Markus	January 30, 1987	February 11, 1987	175117	21.2/34
Donna is in hospital with an appendicitis gets a visit from Ray and Andrew Dowling. Ray is getting concerned about the relationship Donna has with Andrew Dowling. Ray is advised by his lawyer to stop seeing Jenna till his divorce is over. Meanwhile, Charlie & Jenna are missing Ray, but Jenna is unable to explain to Charlie why they can't see him. No one at first shares Pam's concern that Sue Ellen didn't call to say she wasn't coming home for dinner. While J.R. skips family dinner to spend time with April. In the morning Bobby calls the police to report Sue Ellen as missing. J.R. then suddenly arrives home and moments later Sue Ellen. The family suspect her to have started drinking again. J.R. confronts Sue Ellen with photos of her & Calhoun in bed together. Sue Ellen denies the affair & suspects that she must have been drugged by Calhoun. J.R. admits to Bobby about his dealings with Calhoun. Bobby enlarges the photos of Calhoun & Sue Ellen and so names the hotel Calhoun is staying at. Cliff reluctantly tricks Pam in telling him which company Ewing Oil is bidding to buy & passes the information to Jeremy Wendell. Cliff gets drunk with guilt. Clayton continues his unsuccessful hunt for Wes. Bobby & J.R. find a video message from Calhoun waiting for them at the hotel. NOTE: Cliff's one-night stand is played by Brenda Strong, who would go on the play Ann Ewing in the TNT continuation of Dallas.
241	19	"High Noon for Calhoun"	David Paulsen	David Paulsen	February 6, 1987	February 18, 1987	175118	21.6/34
Fearing for the safety of their families, J.R. and Bobby send Sue Ellen, Pam, John Ross and Christopher off to California to escape the menacing threat of B.D. Calhoun. But when the mercenary locates them, J.R. is forced into a deadly showdown with the terrorist. April experiences loneliness pangs. Cliff throws himself into a precarious deal and is frantic when Pam isn't there to back him up financially. Andrew Dowling continues to entertain Donna. Miss Ellie and Clayton enjoy a private weekend away from Southfork. Meanwhile in California Calhoun kidnaps John Ross, and plays a game of cat and mouse with J.R. The situation comes to a head when J.R. is shot and Calhoun turns the gun on John Ross, J.R. must watch his son die. Bobby and Ray come to the rescue killing Calhoun.
242	20	"Olio"	Steve Kanaly	Leonard Katzman	February 13, 1987	March 11, 1987	175119	19.5/32
J.R. pays an emotional price for his involvement with B.D. Calhoun, but he may face a bigger danger with the law for toiling with the terrorist. Despite her growing relationship with Andrew Dowling, Donna feels stifled in her efforts for the oil lobby. Bobby takes temporary charge of Ewing Oil, but it's J.R. who's doing the dirty work through April Stevens. Ray attempts to explain to Charlie why he has to stay away from her and Jenna. Pam and Cliff lock horns over her loyalties. Everyone at Southfork receives numbing news from California: Jamie is dead.
243	21	"A Death in the Family"	Michael Preece	Mitchell Wayne Katzman	February 20, 1987	March 18, 1987	175120	19.5/30
J.R. and April continue their quiet search for Jack. Sue Ellen shuts down her Los Angeles lingerie operation but finds a new "Valentine Girl" for the Dallas store. Christopher and John Ross play a potentially deadly game. Ray considers playing dirty in his divorce suit with Donna. Sue Ellen and J.R. renew their love for each other.
244	22	"Revenge of the Nerd"	Linda Gray	Calvin Clements, Jr.	February 27, 1987	March 25, 1987	175121	19.6/30
Jamie's death in a cliff fall leaves her husband holding a percentage of Ewing Oil. Furious at Cliff's disturbing news, J.R. divides the Southfork house by accusing Pam of scheming with her brother to ruin Ewing Oil. Sue Ellen offers an interesting solution to Pam's predicament. April desperately seeks comfort from the men in her life. Ray arrives at a painful resolution in his custody battle with Donna over their unborn child. Miss Ellie explodes over the strife at Southfork. B.D. Calhoun continues to plague J.R.
245	23	"The Ten Percent Solution"	Michael Preece	Susan Howard Chrane	March 13, 1987	April 1, 1987	175122	18.6/30
J.R. deviously schemes to frame Cliff for Jamie's death. While secretly maneuvering to secure the ten percent of Ewing Oil, J.R. also orchestrates a meeting between April and a friendly judge who may be helpful to their cause. Pam gets suspicious of Cliff's dealings with Jeremy Wendell. Cliff desperately attempts to raise money to back a Wendell loan. Donna brushes off the persistent Andrew Dowling. Nancy, an angry widow of a former Ewing employee plots revenge on the family.
246	24	"Some Good, Some Bad"	Larry Hagman	Louella Lee Caraway	March 20, 1987	April 8, 1987	175123	19.2/31
Jack Ewing comes to Bobby and J.R.'s aid in their quest for the ten percent of Ewing Oil. Jeremy Wendell reveals Cliff's underhanded business dealings to Pam, but not before both she and Bobby come to her brother's defense for allegedly murdering Jamie. Bobby, attempting to clear the air between him and Ray, gets a shock when he visits Ray's house. J.R. asks a wary Sue Ellen to move back in to their bedroom. Ray and Jenna reach an understanding.
247	25	"War and Peace"	Dwight Adair	Leah Markus	April 3, 1987	April 15, 1987	175124	20.0/32
Pam moves out of her office at Barnes-Wentworth. The trial to determine the fate of the ten percent of Ewing Oil is held and the judge delivers an unexpected verdict. With business lagging at Valentine Lingerie, Sue Ellen realizes she may need to get Mandy back modelling for the company. Nancy goes to a local newspaper with the story about the Ewings' involvement with terrorists, but they need proof before running the story. Donna has a baby girl and she calls her Margaret
248	26	"Ruthless People"	Patrick Duffy	Mitchell Wayne Katzman	April 10, 1987	April 22, 1987	175125	18.6/32
Double-crossed by J.R. and April, Jeremy Wendell vows revenge on Ewing Oil and he may have found it in a small Texas newspaper. A banner headline implicating J.R. in terrorism activities not only provides Wendell with ammunition, but outrages Miss Ellie and the rest of the Ewings. Mandy returns to be Sue Ellen's "Valentine Lingerie" girl but she has designs on doing much more. Ray goes to Washington, D.C., to see his daughter and reaches an understanding with Donna and Andrew Dowling. An expectant Jenna ponders her living situation.
249	27	"The Dark at the End of the Tunnel"	Larry Hagman	Calvin Clements, Jr.	May 1, 1987	May 6, 1987	175126	18.8/32
Tired of J.R.'s underhanded business tactics, Bobby, Ray and Miss Ellie "sell out" their shares of Ewing Oil to J.R. News from Washington hurls the Southfork family members into angry turmoil. Sue Ellen cautiously hatches a plot to test J.R.'s supposed loyalty. Pam finally confronts Jenna and informs her a new time is coming. A very wealthy April Stevens reciprocates on past feelings of humiliation.
250	28	"Two-Fifty"	Michael Preece	Leonard Katzman	May 8, 1987	May 13, 1987	175127	18.3/32
Miss Ellie is distraught over the fate of both Clayton and Ewing Oil. J.R. desperately scrambles to defend himself and the company against the justice department charges. Jeremy Wendell continues to coerce Alfred and Mrs. Scottfield into cooperating against the Ewings. Mandy reveals the true reason for her return to Dallas. Bobby unexpectedly bumps into a very expectant Jenna who goes into labor. Andrew Dowling agrees to help Bobby investigate the chances of saving Ewing Oil. Pam attempts to serve warning to Cliff about the impending demise of Ewing Oil, but he is wary of her loyalties.
251	29	"Fall of the House of Ewing"	Leonard Katzman	David Paulsen	May 15, 1987	May 20, 1987	175128	29.5/37
Jenna gives birth to a baby boy she calls Lucas; Christopher learns of his adoption; J.R. and Bobby continue negotiations with the Justice Department; Mrs. Scottfield and Jeremy Wendell reveal their plans; Sue Ellen and Mandy fight over J.R. J.R. loses Ewing Oil when the Justice Department shuts the company down. Pam receives wonderful medical news, and races to get home to tell Bobby, but crashes her car into a fuel truck which explodes in a fiery finale.
