= Dallas season 12 =

Dallas
- Season 12
- DVD cover
- No. of episodes: 26

Release
- Original network: CBS
- Original release: October 28, 1988 – May 19, 1989

Season chronology
- ← Previous; Season 11 Next → Season 13

The twelfth season of the television series Dallas aired on CBS during the 1988–89 TV season.

== Cast ==
=== Starring ===
In alphabetical order:

- Barbara Bel Geddes as Miss Ellie Ewing Farlow (20 episodes)
- Patrick Duffy as Bobby Ewing (26 episodes)
- Linda Gray as Sue Ellen Ewing (26 episodes)
- Larry Hagman as J. R. Ewing (26 episodes)
- Steve Kanaly as Ray Krebbs (5 episodes)
- Howard Keel as Clayton Farlow (22 episodes)
- Ken Kercheval as Cliff Barnes (25 episodes)
- Charlene Tilton as Lucy Ewing Cooper (20 episodes)
- Sheree J. Wilson as April Stevens (24 episodes)

=== Also starring ===
- George Kennedy as Carter McKay (26 episodes)
- Cathy Podewell as Cally Harper Ewing (21 episodes)
- Beth Toussaint as Tracey Lawton (16 episodes)
- Ian McShane as Don Lockwood (13 episodes)
- William Smithers as Jeremy Wendell (8 episodes)
- Andrew Stevens as Casey Denault (7 episodes)
- Audrey Landers as Afton Cooper Van Buren (6 episodes)
- Leigh Taylor-Young as Kimberly Cryder (1 episode)

=== Notable guest stars ===
Leigh McCloskey returns as Mitch Cooper an episode, without being credited as "also starring" - making him the only Dallas example of a billing demotion from also starring status to guest star. Gayle Hunnicutt joins the cast as Vanessa Beaumont for three episodes, while other additions to the cast include Jeri Gaile (Rose Daniels McKay), J. Eddie Peck (Tommy McKay), John Hoge (Detective Ratagan) and Gunnar Hellström (Rolf Brundin).

Margaret Michaels makes one appearance as former main character Pamela Barnes Ewing, and Jenna Pangburn appears in two episodes as Pamela Rebecca Cooper, a character played by Deborah Kellner in the 1996 television film Dallas: J.R. Returns and Julie Gonzalo in the 2012 Dallas revival series.

Although Dallas has had no crossovers with its spin-off series Knots Landing since the ninth series, Joan Van Ark features in uncredited archive footage as Valene Clements in the episode "Comings and Goings".

== DVD release ==
The twelfth season of Dallas' was released by Warner Bros. Home Video, on a Region 1 DVD box set of three double-sided DVDs, on January 19, 2010. Like the other DVD sets of the show's last five seasons, it does not include any extras.

== Episodes ==
No. overall	No. in season	Title	Directed by	Written by	Original U.S. air date	Original U.K. air date	Prod. code	U.S. viewers (millions)
282	1	"Carousel"	Michael Preece	Leonard Katzman	October 28, 1988	January 4, 1989	177101	25.3
Sue Ellen is disappointed to learn that J.R. isn't dead; Cliff is overjoyed at the thought of seeing Pam again, until she makes it clear to him that she wants nothing to do with any part of her former life in Dallas; J.R. tries to make his condition appear worse than it is in order to manipulate Bobby into partnering with him; Lucy inadvertently finds out where John Ross is and reunites him with Sue Ellen; a drought in Dallas is threatening the cattle herd at Southfork; Cliff lies to Bobby about seeing Pam; Carter McKay arrives in Dallas and is interested in buying Ray's house; Bobby agrees to a conditional partnership with J.R.
283	2	"No Greater Love"	Russ Mayberry	Simon Masters	November 4, 1988	January 11, 1989	177102	23.1
John Ross asks Sue Ellen why she shot his dad; upon learning that it will increase his chances of getting full custody of John Ross, J.R. moves back into Southfork; both Clayton and Cliff make appealing business proposals to Bobby; John Ross isn't very happy living in Sue Ellen's new house and it doesn't go unnoticed by Sue Ellen; Mitch arrives at Southfork to work things out with Lucy, but it doesn't go well; After she sees Bobby with another woman, April is jealous and blurts out the truth about Cliff's meeting with Pam; Carter McKay moves into the Krebbs' place; Sue Ellen agrees to let John Ross live at Southfork, but only if J.R. signs over full custody to her.
284	3	"The Call of the Wild"	Michael Preece	Jonathan Hales	November 11, 1988	January 18, 1989	177103	20.4
The drought continues; Sue Ellen is determined to get back at J.R.; Casey returns to Dallas, ecstatic, after having struck oil on the 'worthless' dust field J.R. gave to his father; stung over Pam's rejection, a depressed Cliff is intent on getting out of the oil business; while on a hunting trip with Bobby and the boys, J.R. meets and becomes infatuated with Cally Harper.
285	4	"Out of the Frying Pan"	Russ Mayberry	Mitchell Wayne Katzman	November 18, 1988	January 25, 1989	177104	21.6
Cliff sells Barnes-Wentworth Oil to Jeremy Wendell; Casey romances Lucy; Miss Ellie suggests that Bobby ask Cliff to be a partner in Ewing Oil; Cally's brothers catch her in bed with J.R.; Bobby tries to apologize to April, but she's too hurt by his rejection to accept; Sue Ellen is frustrated to learn that J.R. hasn't been spending much time with John Ross; J.R. is charged and convicted of rape and sent to a backwoods penal camp.
286	5	"Road Work"	Michael Preece	Arthur Bernard Lewis	December 2, 1988	February 1, 1989	177105	22.3
Believing it to be due to a woman, the Ewings aren't very concerned about J.R.'s prolonged absence; Sue Ellen teams up with Jeremy Wendell against J.R.; Cliff agrees to join Ewing Oil and he and Bobby go to a pool hall to celebrate, while there Bobby meets Tracey Lawton, who is hustling another one of the patrons; Casey's relationship with Lucy isn't progressing as quickly as he'd like; Clayton is infuriated after discovering that Carter McKay has dammed his part of the river that runs through Southfork, leaving the cattle on Southfork with no water; J.R. repeatedly tries to find a way out of the penal camp, but he only ends up worse off than before.
287	6	"War and Love and the Whole Damned Thing"	Russ Mayberry	Leonard Katzman	December 9, 1988	February 8, 1989	177106	21.8
Ray returns to Southfork; the Ewings blow up Carter McKay's dam; Sue Ellen and Jeremy Wendell plot J.R.'s downfall, but she has to sell her WestStar stock to Jeremy in order to raise the necessary funds; tensions continue to mount between the Ewings and Carter McKay; Sue Ellen's divorce from J.R. becomes final; Bobby runs into Tracey Lawton again; Lucy asks Casey to be patient with her need to take their relationship slow; Cliff officially joins Ewing Oil; after the guard J.R. bribed to release him turns him over to Cally's brothers, J.R. is forced to make a choice he may later regret.
288	7	"Showdown at the Ewing Corral"	Michael Preece	Mitchell Wayne Katzman	December 16, 1988	February 15, 1989	177107	20.8
Jeremy lets Sue Ellen know that he is interested in having more than just a business relationship with her; J.R. is able to escape from the Harpers and return to Dallas; Carter has his ranch foreman, Hughes, try to threaten and then bribe the Southfork ranch hands into leaving; Tracey tells Bobby about her previous marriage; Cliff gleefully tells J.R. that he is now a partner in Ewing Oil; Carter is shocked to see Tracey with Bobby; Miss Ellie stands up to Carter when he tells her that she will have to sell a piece of Southfork to him in order to make the trouble between them go away. NOTE: The trailer for this episode, featured at the end of the previous episode, features a scene with J.R. attempting to flee the Harper house and being confronted by an angry Rottweiler. However, no such scene appears.
289	8	"Deception"	Irving J. Moore	Arthur Bernard Lewis	January 6, 1989	February 22, 1989	445008	22.6
Jeremy advises Sue Ellen to use whatever she has to, including John Ross, to get revenge on J.R.; the Ewings learn that the Southfork land that Carter McKay wants to buy is Section 40, the area that has large oil deposits; Casey convinces Lucy to invest in his company Denault Inc., he then transfers most of that money to his other company with April; April learns from J.R. that Casey's oil strike in Oklahoma was nowhere near as big as he told her; Carter is rattled when he discovers the man Tracey is seeing is Bobby Ewing; the connection between Carter and Tracey is revealed.
290	9	"Counter Attack"	Michael Preece	Leonard Katzman	January 13, 1989	March 1, 1989	445009	20.9
J.R. has nightmares over his recent ordeal with the Harpers; knowing that Casey doesn't have the funds to do it, April talks to him about each of them investing more money into their company; not wanting her revenge on J.R. to extend to the rest of the Ewings, Sue Ellen ends her association with Jeremy Wendell; after Christopher ends up in the middle of a gunfight between Bobby, Ray and McKay's men, the Ewings go on the attack; Bobby is shocked to learn that Tracey's father is Carter McKay.
291	10	"The Sting"	Irving J. Moore	Mitchell Wayne Katzman	January 20, 1989	March 8, 1989	445010	23.2
Hoping to end all of the fighting, Miss Ellie agrees to sell Section 40 to Carter McKay; Carter refuses to sign Section 40 over to Jeremy Wendell until he lives up to his end of their deal; after April and Lucy expose Casey's lies concerning his oil strike, J.R. offers to be a silent partner with April in a new oil company; Cliff begins dating Tammy Miller; Ray says goodbye to Southfork and the Ewings; in order to raise the money to buy Section 40, Jeremy must sell all of his WestStar stock; while Carter gets a visit from an old friend, J.R. gets one from someone he hoped to never see again.
292	11	"The Two Mrs. Ewings"	Michael Preece	Arthur Bernard Lewis	January 27, 1989	March 15, 1989	445011	23.3
Cally is desperate to have J.R. accept her as his wife; a visit from Bruce Harvey, the movie producer Sue Ellen used to lure Mandy Winger out of Dallas, starts Sue Ellen thinking about buying a movie studio; John Ross doesn't like having a new step-mother; J.R. overhears Cliff tell Bobby about a very lucrative deal, then J.R. gets April to purchase it for their company; Sue Ellen meets the new Mrs. J.R. Ewing; with Jeremy Wendell arrested, Carter McKay is announced as the new Chairman of WestStar.
293	12	"The Switch"	Irving J. Moore	Leonard Katzman	February 3, 1989	March 22, 1989	445012	23.5
Cally makes a friend at Southfork; due to her feelings for Bobby, Tammy and Cliff end their relationship; Tracey agrees to work for her father at WestStar; an unexpected source gives Cally advice on how to get J.R.'s attention; John Ross threatens Cally with forcing J.R. to make a choice between the two of them; J.R. gets word that Nicholas' mob-connected father is looking into his son's death.
294	13	"He-e-ere's Papa!"	Patrick Duffy	Louella Lee Caraway	February 10, 1989	March 29, 1989	445013	22.3
Carter has Tracey learn all she can about the history of WestStar Oil; J.R. has a long talk with Joseph Lombardi concerning the events that lead to Nicholas' death; John Ross believes that Cally is standing in the way of his parents getting back together; Cliff talks to Bobby about selling some old Ewing Oil properties, but those properties are controlled by J.R.; Sue Ellen has the opportunity to get rid of J.R. once and for all.
295	14	"Comings and Goings"	Larry Hagman	Mitchell Wayne Katzman	February 17, 1989	April 5, 1989	445014	22.9
Sue Ellen is introduced to Don Lockwood, the man that is to write and direct the uncomplimentary movie she wants to make about J.R., she then enlists Lucy's help in providing material for the movie; Carter's recently detoxed son, Tommy, arrives in Dallas, but he may not be as clean as he claims to be; J.R. is willing to make Cliff's profitable deal and sell the properties he controls, but only if Bobby agrees to allow J.R. back into the oil side of Ewing Oil; Cally rescues John Ross after he almost drowns in the pool;
296	15	"Country Girl"	Patrick Duffy	Arthur Bernard Lewis	February 24, 1989	April 12, 1989	445015	25.9
J.R. plans to double-cross Bobby and Cliff concerning the sale of the Ewing properties; Carter finds drugs hidden in Tommy's bedroom; Cally is finally making progress in getting John Ross to like her; Miss Ellie demands J.R. either accept Cally as his wife or divorce her; Tracey is worried about her brother after April catches Tommy's eye; Bobby is suspicious of Tommy's behaviour; Sue Ellen gives Don her diaries to read to help him in writing the movie; Cally tells J.R. that she is having his child.
297	16	"Wedding Belle Blues"	Larry Hagman	Howard Lakin	February 24, 1989	April 19, 1989	445016	25.9
With storm clouds overhead, J.R. and Cally get married; Sue Ellen asks Don to escort her to the wedding so that he can get a feel for Southfork; Cliff gets evidence that J.R. is attempting to sell the Ewing properties to another company, but he doesn't know that J.R. and April own that company; a violent storm forces Sue Ellen, Don, Cliff, April and the McKays to seek refuge at Southfork for the night; April is unsettled by Tommy's actions; when Cally tells J.R. that she lied about being pregnant, J.R. realizes she may be a more fitting Ewing bride than he believed.
298	17	"The Way We Were"	Patrick Duffy	Louella Lee Caraway	March 3, 1989	April 26, 1989	445017	23.0
Tommy receives a shipment of cocaine from South America, then when Tommy can't get an import license due to his criminal record, Tracey agrees to get the license for him, not knowing that he plans to use it to import drugs; April tells Bobby that she wants them to be friends again, even if they are rivals in the oil business; Tommy admits to J.R. that he blames Carter for his mother's death; Don kisses Sue Ellen after she tells him about a painful part of her past.
299	18	"The Serpent's Tooth"	Larry Hagman	Story by : Mitchell Wayne Katzman; Teleplay by : Arthur Bernard Lewis & Howard Lakin	March 10, 1989	May 3, 1989	445018	19.4
Needing more money for his 'business', Tommy offers to sell information about an important European deal Carter is working on for WestStar to J.R.; Christopher feels left out now that John Ross has accepted Cally as his step-mother; Sue Ellen and Don have an argument over the script for the movie; with his relationship with Tracey having reached a standstill, Bobby starts spending more time with his new friend April; J.R. thinks that he finally has what he needs to get Bobby to allow him back completely into Ewing Oil.
300	19	"Three Hundred"	Patrick Duffy	Leonard Katzman	March 17, 1989	May 10, 1989	445019	19.0
Bobby catches J.R. poking his nose into the company's oil business, then after he confronts J.R., the two of them get trapped in the elevator at Ewing Oil; Sue Ellen begins to wonder if hurting J.R. is worth possibly hurting the rest of the Ewing family; Tommy apologizes to April for his behaviour at Southfork the night of J.R. and Cally's wedding, but later he gets angry with her when she again rejects his overly aggressive advances; stuck in the elevator all night, Bobby and J.R. have a long talk about Ewing Oil, J.R. tells Bobby about WestStar's European deal and Bobby agrees to make J.R. a full partner in Ewing Oil.
301	20	"April Showers"	Irving J. Moore	Howard Lakin	March 31, 1989	May 17, 1989	445020	20.5
Cliff doesn't react well when Bobby tells him that he has decided to make J.R. a full partner at Ewing Oil, that is until he hears about the European deal; Sue Ellen and Don go to L.A. to cast roles for the movie; Cally is determined to improve herself believing that it will make her a more suitable wife for J.R.; Bobby and Tracey realize their relationship isn't moving forward and call it quits; desperate for more money and high on cocaine, Tommy trashes April's apartment and assaults her; Bobby attacks Tommy; Carter vows revenge on Bobby for hurting both of his children.
302	21	"And Away We Go!"	Steve Kanaly	Arthur Bernard Lewis	April 7, 1989	May 24, 1989	445021	20.4
Fearful of both the police and his South American drug suppliers, Tommy flees Dallas; J.R. continues with his plan to manipulate Ewing Oil into the European deal; Tracey tells Bobby she's leaving Dallas to try to find Tommy; Cliff is pleasantly surprised to find that his ex-girlfriend Afton Cooper has returned to Dallas, but she's worried that Cliff is still the same work-obsessed man he was when she left; Bobby, J.R. and Cally leave for Europe to complete the deal for Ewing Oil.
303	22	"Yellow Brick Road"	Cliff Fenneman	Leonard Katzman	April 14, 1989	May 31, 1989	445022	20.8
Bobby, J.R., and Cally arrive in Salzburg, Austria where they are befriended by an American couple secretly working for Carter McKay; Don gives Sue Ellen a finished copy of the manuscript for her movie; Miss Ellie is worried when Clayton doesn't return after leaving Southfork early in the morning; Bobby receives a mysterious letter requesting a meeting with him and is surprised to see who it is from; Miss Ellie is alarmed to hear that Clayton was thrown from his horse and, as a result, he has partial amnesia and doesn't remember her; Cliff is shocked when he goes to visit Afton, but instead meets her daughter, Pamela Rebecca Cooper; J.R. and Bobby meet with the head of the European consortium, however, the offer he gives them may be more than they are willing to make.
304	23	"The Sound of Money"	Irving J. Moore	Arthur Bernard Lewis	April 28, 1989	June 7, 1989	445023	19.0
J.R. and Bobby reject Herr Brundin's offer to buy Ewing Oil and suspect Carter McKay was behind it, however, Brundin is still interested in making a deal the Ewings; J.R. is having a tough time keeping up with Cally's youthful energy; Afton is angry with Cliff for going to her home uninvited and is reluctant to talk about her daughter, but when Cliff insinuates that Pamela is his child by expressing concern that she may have the fatal genetic condition that runs in his family, Afton tells Cliff that he is not Pamela's father; Clayton doesn't remember the last 20 years of his life and has a hard time believing Miss Ellie when she tells him that he sold the Southern Cross Ranch; Sue Ellen considers telling Miss Ellie that she is making a movie about her marriage to J.R. after realizing that Miss Ellie may learn some rather disturbing secrets her son has kept from her; while in Vienna, J.R. runs into an old flame.
305	24	"The Great Texas Waltz"	Linda Gray	Howard Lakin	May 5, 1989	June 14, 1989	445024	19.0
J.R. tells Bobby that Vanessa Beaumont is the one woman that ever broke his heart; Carter asks April to talk Bobby out of going after the European deal saying that if the Ewings steal this deal from him it will lead to all out war; Cliff hires a private investigator to look into the birth of Afton's daughter; after a romantic evening at a Viennese ball, Bobby and April make love; Sue Ellen wants Don and John Ross to get to know each other, but John Ross isn't interested in having another step-parent; Clayton finds that every part of his life in San Angelo is gone; Vanessa warns J.R. that the European consortium is not as it appears and that J.R. and Bobby must to go to Moscow to find the answers they need.
306	25	"Mission to Moscow"	Michael Preece	Leonard Katzman	May 12, 1989	June 21, 1989	445025	18.8
In Moscow, J.R. and Bobby learn that the European consortium is merely a front for OPEC and decide to pull out of the deal rather than put their oil at the control of the Arabs; Miss Ellie begins to despair that Clayton will never remember their life together, but Clayton's memory returns after Miss Ellie suffers a minor accident; Cliff's private investigator gives him evidence which insinuates that Cliff is the father of Afton's daughter, but when Cliff goes to confront Afton with it he is told that she has left town; J.R. and Bobby try to warn Carter about dealing with the consortium; as production of the movie nears completion, Sue Ellen and Don have to deal with how that will affect their relationship.
307	26	"Reel Life"	Irving J. Moore	Arthur Bernard Lewis & Howard Lakin	May 19, 1989	June 28, 1989	445026	19.6
Having returned to Dallas with Bobby, J.R. and Cally, April begins receiving unsettling, anonymous phone calls which Bobby believes are from Tommy McKay; Cliff goes to Baton Rouge in an effort to track down Afton; with production of the movie completed, Don asks Sue Ellen to move to London with him; Miss Ellie receives a letter intended for Jock which contains a mysterious note and a key; Sue Ellen shows J.R. a rough cut of the movie which alarms him. She then informs him that she has no plans to release it unless J.R. ever steps out of line and does something to hurt her or John Ross. Knowing the film will truly ruin him, J.R. watches helplessly as his ex-wife leaves Dallas.
