= Dallas season 11 =

Dallas
- Season 11
- DVD cover
- No. of episodes: 30

Release
- Original network: CBS
- Original release: September 25, 1987 – May 13, 1988

Season chronology
- ← Previous; Season 10 Next → Season 12

The eleventh season of the television series Dallas aired on CBS during the 1987–88 TV season.

== Cast ==
=== Starring ===
In alphabetical order:

- Barbara Bel Geddes as Miss Ellie Ewing Farlow (30 episodes)
- Patrick Duffy as Bobby Ewing (30 episodes)
- Linda Gray as Sue Ellen Ewing (30 episodes)
- Larry Hagman as J. R. Ewing (30 episodes)
- Steve Kanaly as Ray Krebbs (30 episodes)
- Howard Keel as Clayton Farlow (30 episodes)
- Ken Kercheval as Cliff Barnes (30 episodes)
- Priscilla Beaulieu Presley as Jenna Wade Krebbs (27 episodes)

=== Also starring ===
- Jack Scalia as Nicholas Pearce (28 episodes)
- Sheree J. Wilson as April Stevens (28 episodes)
- Andrew Stevens as Casey Denault (26 episodes)
- Leigh Taylor-Young as Kimberly Cryder (19 episodes), billed under "Special Guest Star" status for her first three episodes
- Bert Remsen as Harrison "Dandy" Dandridge (10 episodes)
- Karen Kopins as Kay Lloyd (9 episodes), billed under "Guest Star" status for her first three episodes
- William Smithers as Jeremy Wendell (4 episodes)
- Morgan Brittany as Katherine Wentworth (2 episodes), billed under "Special Guest Star" status for her first appearance
- Charlene Tilton as Lucy Ewing Cooper (2 episodes)

=== Special guest stars ===
- Annabel Schofield as Laurel Ellis (11 episodes)
- John Anderson as Dr. Herbert Styles (7 episodes)
- Howard Duff as Senator Henry Harrison O'Dell (2 episodes)

=== Notable guest stars ===
John Calvin, known for co-starring in Tales of the Gold Monkey and The Paul Lynde Show, appeared in six episodes as Kimberly Cryder's husband Wilson.

Minor recurring actors Deborah Marie Taylor (Oil Barons Club waitress Debbie) and Linda Gray's daughter Kehly Sloane (Sue Ellen's secretary Kelly) join the cast. Amy Stoch (Lisa Alden) appears in a major story-arc, but won't appear in later seasons.

Also - future series star Kimberly Foster, who will portray Michelle Stevens for the final two seasons of the show, makes a minor appearance as an unnamed character in one episode.

A young Brad Pitt appears as a co-star in four episodes of the series playing the role of Randy, the boyfriend of Jenna's daughter Charlie.

== Crew ==
Unlike previous two seasons, season eleven doesn't bring any major changes among the production team. Executive producer Leonard Katzman remains, as do producer David Paulsen, associate producer Cliff Fenneman, story editor Mitchell Wayne Katzman and story consultant Leah Markus. Arthur Bernard Lewis, who departed at the end of season 8, returns to his former position as supervising producer.

Most of the season's writers are as per the previous season: showrunner Leonard Katzman, David Paulsen, Mitchell Wayne Katzman, Leah Markus and Louella Lee Caraway are joined by the returning Arthur Bernard Lewis.

== DVD release ==
The eleventh season of Dallas' was released by Warner Bros. Home Video, on a Region 1 DVD box set of three double-sided DVDs, on April 21, 2009. Like the other DVD sets of the show's last five seasons, it does not include any extras.

== Episodes ==
No. overall	No. in season	Title	Directed by	Written by	Original U.S. air date	Original U.K. air date	Prod. code	Rating/share (households)
252	1	"After the Fall: Ewing Rise"	Leonard Katzman	Arthur Bernard Lewis	September 25, 1987	December 2, 1987	176101	16.9/31
Pam is rushed to the hospital with third-degree burns, leaving Bobby grief-stricken; J.R. starts JRE Industries; Jenna enjoys her new baby Lucas and Ray buys a family car. Cliff worries he's let down the memory of Digger.
253	2	"After the Fall: Digger Redux"	Michael Preece	David Paulsen	September 25, 1987	December 9, 1987	176102	16.9/31
Cliff meets Dandy Dandridge, who reminds him of Digger; J.R. obtains Pam's will to plan in case she dies, while April lends Bobby her support; Sue Ellen is approached with help for her business; Miss Ellie feels Clayton is overexerting himself.
254	3	"The Son Also Rises"	Leonard Katzman	Leah Markus	October 2, 1987	December 16, 1987	176103	17.0/30
Desperate to see his mother, Christopher runs away; Charlie wants Jenna and Ray to marry; J.R. meets Casey Denault, a potential business partner; Clayton continues to quarrel with Miss Ellie about his activity level.
255	4	"Gone with the Wind"	Michael Preece	Mitchell Wayne Katzman	October 9, 1987	December 23, 1987	176104	20.2/35
Ray pressures Jenna to allow Bobby to be a part of Lucas's life; J.R. uses Casey to help him rebuild his company; Nicholas tells Sue Ellen that she needs to expand Valentine Lingerie nationally in order for the company to be successful and the two of them travel to L.A. to look at office space; tired of watching Clayton endanger his health, Miss Ellie asks him to leave Southfork; Pam's bandages are removed; Katherine comes back to Dallas.
256	5	"The Lady Vanishes"	Leonard Katzman	Leonard Katzman	October 16, 1987	December 30, 1987	176105	17.7/30
Bobby arrives at the hospital to find that Pam has disappeared; Bobby suspects Katherine may have kidnapped Pam and he and Cliff hire a private investigator to find her; Serena, a former madam and mistress of J.R.'s, comes to Dallas to ask for J.R.'s help for a friend of hers named Walter Hicks, Hicks owns a drilling equipment company and has a 5 million dollar loan due soon for 20 million dollars of inventory he can't sell due to a lull in drilling; in L.A., Nicholas tries convinces Sue Ellen to buy Secret Hours, a lingerie company with coast-to-coast distribution.
257	6	"Tough Love"	Michael Preece	Arthur Bernard Lewis	October 23, 1987	January 6, 1988	176106	18.2/31
The news that Pam has left devastates both Bobby and Cliff; J.R. secretly takes over Walter's loan from the bank and then forecloses on the loan, cheaply acquiring the inventory; after being left by Walter, Serena is nearly forced back into prostitution until J.R. hires her to dig up dirt on Wilson Cryder, the new head of WestStar; Dandy tells Cliff he owns some land which he believes is loaded with oil; Sue Ellen doesn't have enough money to successfully expand her company, so Nicholas finds her a potential partner; a mysterious blond woman takes an interest in Bobby and Christopher.
258	7	"Last Tango in Dallas"	Jerry Jameson	David Paulsen	October 30, 1987	January 13, 1988	176107	16.9/28
With Pam gone, Charlie is concerned that Jenna will leave Ray for Bobby; the mysterious blond woman introduces herself to Bobby and Christopher as Lisa Alden and tells them that she recently moved to Dallas; Sue Ellen decides not to partner with April and buys Secret Hours on her own; Dandy tells Cliff his land has been tested before with poor results, but Dandy convinces Cliff to go ahead with drilling anyway; Pam sends Bobby a Power of Attorney document giving him control of her Wentworth stock; J.R. learns of the POA document from the PI he hired to find Pam; At the Oil Barons Ball Ray pops the question to Jenna; Clayton has chest pains.
259	8	"Mummy's Revenge"	Michael Preece	Mitchell Wayne Katzman	November 6, 1987	January 20, 1988	176108	17.3/29
Cliff discovers that Dandy owes years of back-taxes on his land and pays it off acquiring the deed; after hearing that Jenna turned down Ray's proposal, Charlie believes that it's because she is still in love with Bobby and Ray leaves to go Washington to see his daughter; Clayton has an angioplasty; Casey has his hands full with an overly amorous Marilee Stone; Lisa continues to try to get closer to Bobby and Christopher; J.R. has upsetting news for Bobby.April is bored she does not know what to do with all the money she has now.
260	9	"Hustling"	Jerry Jameson	Leah Markus	November 13, 1987	January 27, 1988	176109	17.3/29
Cliff continues to sink money into drilling on Dandy's land with no results; J.R. arranges an 'accidental' meeting with Kimberly Cryder, wife of Wilson Cryder; Bobby signs Pam's divorce papers; Casey dreams of one day making big deals for himself and not other people; while speaking with April, Nicholas is approached by a man who believes Nicholas is Joseph Lombardi from Bensonhurst, Nicholas denies this, but later, an intrigued April hires a PI to investigate Joseph Lombardi.Jenna asks Ray to marry her.
261	10	"Bedtime Stories"	Michael Preece	Leonard Katzman	November 20, 1987	February 3, 1988	176110	15.7/25
Bobby decides on a name for his company, Petro Group Dallas; Ray and Jenna announce their engagement; Nicholas is upset that J.R. went to his boss about the way Nicholas is handling Sue Ellen's account; Bobby tells Lisa that he and Christopher need to stop seeing her because Bobby is concerned Christopher is getting too attached to Lisa so soon after Pam leaving; Nicholas calls his father to warn him that someone from the old neighborhood may have recognized him in Dallas; J.R. approaches Bobby with a plan to destroy WestStar Oil; the reason for Lisa's interest in Bobby and Christopher is revealed; J.R. continues to seduce Kimberly Cryder, but she may not be quite the pawn he had imagined.
262	11	"Lovers and Other Liars"	Jerry Jameson	Arthur Bernard Lewis	November 27, 1987	February 10, 1988	176111	15.7/27
Dandy is upset that Cliff has stopped drilling on his land and later, at gunpoint, forces the crew back to work; J.R. urges April to secretly and slowly buy WestStar stock; Lisa disobeys Bobby's wishes and arranges to meet Christopher; Sue Ellen spies J.R. up to old tricks again; J.R. learns that the largest shareholder of WestStar stock is Dr. Herbert Styles and that he has an unexpected connection to Kimberly.
263	12	"Brothers and Sons"	Michael Preece	David Paulsen	December 4, 1987	February 17, 1988	176112	16.7/28
The land in east Texas may not contain oil, but it does have a lot of natural gas; Bobby rediscovers his passion for the oil business; Jenna isn't happy with Ray's choice for his best man; J.R. tells Casey about a company he wants Casey to acquire for JRE, but Casey considers buying the company for himself; April continues to dig into Nicholas' past; Ray and Jenna's wedding day arrives; Christopher learns he has a new half-brother; Sue Ellen meets Kimberly; Lisa shows up at the Ewing barbecue with legal papers for Bobby.
264	13	"Brother, Can You Spare a Child?"	Patrick Duffy	Leah Markus	December 11, 1987	February 24, 1988	176113	15.9/27
Nicholas comforts April when she is upset over not being invited the annual Ewing barbecue; Miss Ellie becomes involved in a project for the DOA, leaving Clayton feeling bored; Cliff talks to Miss Ellie about the history between the Barnes and the Ewings; Christopher feels that Bobby doesn't want him anymore, now that he has a biological son; Sue Ellen arranges a dinner date with herself and J.R. and Kimberly and Wilson Cryder; Casey swindles J.R. by buying Brinker Oil for the cartel he has formed and lies to J.R. about not being able to acquire the company for JRE; Lisa threatens to reveal that Bobby bought Christopher from her brother, then confesses feeling guilty to a surprising partner.
265	14	"Daddy's Little Darlin"	Larry Hagman	Mitchell Wayne Katzman	December 18, 1987	March 2, 1988	176114	14.7/25
Bobby warns Sue Ellen that his custody suit could rehash a lot of old Ewing dirty laundry; J.R. inadvertently learns from one of Casey's cartel members that Casey cheated him out of Brinker Oil and then sets Casey up to buy a worthless piece of property from him; Cliff tries to buy off Lisa; Clayton is intrigued by a portrait he sees at a gallery; Bobby asks April out to dinner; J.R. meets Dr. Herbert Styles who makes him an interesting proposal.
266	15	"It's Me Again"	Leonard Katzman	Leonard Katzman	January 8, 1988	March 9, 1988	176115	17.6/28
J.R. tells Kimberly that he will divorce Sue Ellen and marry her, but she has to divorce Wilson first; Nicholas tells Sue Ellen that he is withdrawing from her account; at J.R. request, Lisa makes friends with Cliff and learns that a farmer will not give Cliff the Right Of Way across his land to attach Cliff's natural gas pipeline to the main line meaning Cliff can't sell his natural gas; Jenna tells Bobby that she still loves him; the man that recognized Nicholas returns to April's restaurant and she questions him about Joseph Lombardi; Clayton meets Laurel Ellis, the woman in the painting he purchased; Ray catches Charlie in the barn with her boyfriend Randy (Brad Pitt); with Sly's help, J.R. buys the farmland Cliff needs.
267	16	"Marriage on the Rocks"	Larry Hagman	Arthur Bernard Lewis	January 15, 1988	March 16, 1988	176116	16.8/27
Ray wants to be a father to Charlie, but she's not interested; J.R. goes to Cliff with a proposal to bring down WestStar; Nicholas tells Sue Ellen that J.R. has had both April and Sly buying WestStar stock; after hearing that Kimberly has started divorce proceedings against Wilson, J.R. talks to a lawyer about his chances for custody of John Ross should he divorce Sue Ellen; Bobby feels betrayed when he sees Cliff having dinner with Lisa; J.R. gives Nicholas his permission to have an affair with Sue Ellen.
268	17	"Anniversary Waltz"	David Paulsen	David Paulsen	January 22, 1988	March 23, 1988	176117	17.2/28
J.R. forgives Casey for his betrayal; Nicholas tells Sue Ellen that he doesn't want her to be with him only to get revenge against J.R.; Cliff agrees to J.R.'s proposal and signs over to J.R. the voting rights for the WestStar stock he has bought in return for the Right Of Way over the farmland J.R. purchased; while Miss Ellie works on her DOA project, Clayton continues to spend time with Laurel; Jenna gets upset with Charlie and slaps her; Bobby realizes the truth about J.R.'s involvement with Lisa.
269	18	"Brotherly Love"	Linda Gray	Leah Markus	February 5, 1988	March 30, 1988	176118	18.6/30
Bobby learns that he may be able to get the Ewing Oil name back again; J.R. tells Lisa that he doesn't need her anymore and to leave Dallas; Casey asks Sly out for a date; when Cliff gets his natural gas pipeline hooked up he wants to celebrate, but instead he finds out how empty his life really is; Kimberly is getting tired of waiting for J.R. to leave Sue Ellen.
270	19	"The Best Laid Plans"	Patrick Duffy	Mitchell Wayne Katzman	February 12, 1988	April 6, 1988	176119	17.5/29
Laurel tells Clayton that he should get back to the man he used to be; Sue Ellen questions Nicholas about J.R.'s ability to take control of WestStar; April is concerned Bobby won't want to see her if he found out about her past relationship with J.R.; Sue Ellen joins forces with Bobby to ensure J.R. never gets Ewing Oil back; J.R. sets Sue Ellen up to catch him with Kimberly; Miss Ellie sees something upsetting; Charlie asks for Bobby's help in dealing with Ray and Jenna, but Ray resents Bobby's interference.
271	20	"Farlow's Follies"	Steve Kanaly	Louella Lee Caraway	February 19, 1988	April 13, 1988	176120	17.1/27
Ray, Jenna and Charlie agree to put aside their recent difficulties; Clayton decides to go back to work; Sue Ellen's unwillingness to give J.R. a divorce is putting his plan to take over WestStar in jeopardy; Bobby travels to Washington to see about getting back the Ewing Oil name and meets Kay Lloyd, one of Senator Dowling's staff members; Miss Ellie spies Clayton with Laurel again and believes he is having an affair; April reveals a secret to Bobby.
272	21	"Malice in Dallas"	Larry Hagman	Arthur Bernard Lewis	February 26, 1988	April 20, 1988	176121	16.6/27
Lisa returns to Dallas and renews the custody fight for Christopher; Charlie is skipping school and failing her classes, so Jenna and Ray consider sending her away to boarding school; Clayton isn't having an affair, but more suspicious circumstances convince Miss Ellie that her marriage is in serious trouble and she tells Mavis about her fears about Clayton; April warns Nicholas that there may be people after him and he visits his parents to tell them that they may have been found out; Kimberly is afraid J.R. won't marry her if he can control of WestStar without her and takes steps to ensure that can't happen; a verdict is rendered in the custody trial.
273	22	"Crime Story"	Patrick Duffy	David Paulsen	March 4, 1988	April 27, 1988	176122	16.3/27
Lisa goes to Southfork to say goodbye to Christopher; Casey informs J.R. about his meeting with Kimberley; Sue Ellen tells J.R. that she knows exactly what he's been up to; April is frightened when the men looking for Nicholas contact her; Laurel's friend David tries to blackmail Clayton for $50,000 to keep his silence regarding Clayton's alleged affair with Laurel; Bobby continues to get closer to Kay and later tells April that he doesn't think that their relationship should go any further.
274	23	"To Have and to Hold"	Larry Hagman	Leah Markus	March 11, 1988	May 4, 1988	176123	15.3/26
Two men come April's apartment to 'talk' to her about Joey Lombardi and she tells them that Joey Lombardi is now Nicholas Pearce and where to find him; because of J.R. the price of WestStar stock is dropping and J.R. asks Ray buy some stock to help him take control of the company, but Ray refuses; Ray and Jenna tell Charlie that they want to send her to a Swiss boarding school and she is not happy about it; the mob men are looking for Nicholas' father and Nicholas sets up a ruse to make them believe his parents are dead; Casey opens up to Sly about his father's business dealings with J.R. and his own ambitions; Miss Ellie finally reveals to Clayton her suspicion that he is having an affair.
275	24	"Dead Reckoning"	David Paulsen	Mitchell Wayne Katzman	March 18, 1988	May 11, 1988	176124	14.6/24
Despite Clayton's vow that he is not having an affair, Miss Ellie tells him that she cannot trust him and asks him to leave Southfork; Jenna decides to accompany Charlie to Switzerland to help her adjust to her new boarding school; Cliff is becoming more and more agitated over all of the money he is losing due to the drop in the price of the WestStar stock J.R. made him buy and he begins to take tranquilizers to help him sleep; an enraged Clayton assaults David after hearing that David lied to Miss Ellie about Clayton having an affair with Laurel; Casey is becoming increasingly tired of working for J.R., but he lacks the money or the connections to really make it big.
276	25	"Never Say Never"	Cliff Fenneman	Leonard Katzman	April 1, 1988	May 18, 1988	176125	16.2/28
David is dead and Clayton is arrested for murder; Miss Ellie stands by Clayton, but lets him know it's mostly for appearances; with Jenna and Charlie in Switzerland, Ray is feeling lonely in his big empty house, until he meets Connie; Casey goes to Cliff and tells him that they have a lot in common because the way Jock treated Digger is exactly the way J.R. treated Casey's father; Cliff begins to overuse the tranquilizers; Bobby is upset when a senator he meets in Washington asks for a bribe in return for his help to get the right to use the Ewing name back for Bobby; concerned about the added stress the fight for WestStar is putting on the already frail health of her father, Kimberly goes to J.R. and informs him that she will convince her father to back J.R., however, J.R. is not interested in a truce, he wants a total surrender.
277	26	"Last of the Good Guys"	Michael Preece	Arthur Bernard Lewis	April 8, 1988	May 25, 1988	176126	16.2/28
Clayton informs Miss Ellie that he doesn't want to continue living at Southfork if it's just for show, but Miss Ellie doesn't want Clayton to leave, she just needs more time; J.R. sets his sights on Laurel; Ray sleeps with Connie, but immediately regrets it; Sue Ellen asks Nicholas to buy her a large amount of WestStar stock; Casey realizes that J.R. will never let him out from under his thumb, so he tries to make a business deal with Cliff; J.R. gets proof that Clayton didn't kill David and he's willing to use it, for a price; Kimberly is surprised to get Sue Ellen's support in the battle for WestStar, but the fight may cost Kimberly something more dear to her.
278	27	"Top Gun"	Michael Preece	David Paulsen	April 15, 1988	June 1, 1988	176127	16.8/30
Cliff's abuse of tranquilizers is becoming more and more apparent; Bobby is told that he will never get back the Ewing Oil name; Kimberly blames J.R. for her father's death; Nicholas finally confides in Sue Ellen about his past; Connie is not willing to let go of Ray; Bobby is having a difficult time accepting the demands of Kay's career; Clayton is disgusted to learn that J.R. blackmailed Laurel into bed in return for getting the murder charges dropped. The shareholders at WestStar elect a new Chairman of the Board and J.R. expects to be elected, using the voting rights from April, Cliff and Sly, but is stunned when Sue Ellen arrives at the meeting as a secret shareholder and votes against J.R., preventing him from taking over WestStar.
279	28	"Pillow Talk"	Dwight Adair	Leah Markus	April 29, 1988	June 8, 1988	176128	15.6/27
J.R. is furious with Sue Ellen for siding with Kimberly and voting Jeremy Wendell back as Chairman of WestStar; Sue Ellen leaves Southfork, but J.R. prevents her from taking John Ross; Ray orders a very unstable Connie to stay away from him; J.R. informs Casey that he no longer needs his services; Miss Ellie wants Clayton to be co-owner of Southfork.
280	29	"Things Ain't Goin' Too Good at Southfork, Again"	Linda Gray	Mitchell Wayne Katzman	May 6, 1988	June 15, 1988	176129	15.6/28
A psychotic Connie tries to stab Ray; Jenna is frightened at what she finds when she returns home from Europe; Cliff informs J.R. that he has sold his natural gas field and his WestStar stock to Jeremy Wendell; Miss Ellie is angry with J.R. for keeping John Ross away from Sue Ellen; Bobby gets the right to use the Ewing Oil name; J.R. is furious after learning that Clayton is now co-owner of Southfork and leaves the ranch; Cliff agrees to give Casey a chance; Bobby and Kay decide to end their relationship because neither is willing to give up their career and move; Lucy returns home.
281	30	"The Fat Lady Singeth"	Leonard Katzman	Leonard Katzman	May 13, 1988	June 22, 1988	176130	17.3/30
Lucy takes a liking to Casey after he tells her that he hates J.R.; J.R. blackmails Jeremy Wendell and re-acquires the former Ewing Oil assets from WestStar; Jordan Lee tells Cliff that he saw Pam; Jenna forgives Ray and they decide to leave Dallas; a confrontation over John Ross between Nicholas, Sue Ellen and J.R. has a tragic ending. During the fight, J.R. throws Nicholas over the balcony and Sue Ellen retaliates by shooting J.R.
