= Jack Ewing =

- Dallas character
- Portrayed by: Dack Rambo
- Duration: 1985–87
- First appearance: April 12, 1985; Terms of Estrangement
- Last appearance: April 3, 1987; War and Peace
In-universe information
- Occupation: Shareholder of Ewing Oil
- Family: Ewing
- Parents: Jason Ewing; Nancy Shaw Ewing
- Siblings: Jamie Ewing
- Spouse: April Stevens (divorced)
- Grandparents: Leander Ewing
- Aunts and uncles: Jock Ewing
- First cousins: J.R. Ewing; Gary Ewing; Bobby Ewing; Ray Krebbs

Jack Ewing is a character that appeared in the popular American television series Dallas, played by Dack Rambo from 1985 to 1987.

== Background ==
Jack was born in Alaska in 1951, to Jason and Nancy Ewing. He had a younger sister named Jamie Ewing. Jack married and divorced April Stevens before his arrival in Dallas.

== Storylines ==
Jack arrived in Dallas to help his cousins, J.R. Ewing and Bobby Ewing, stop Cliff Barnes and Jamie Ewing from splitting up Ewing Oil. (Jamie had turned up in Dallas with a document which stated that Jock Ewing, Jason Ewing and Digger Barnes had equally split the company up between them in the 1930s). He had information that proved Jock bought his partners' shares a while later. For his help, Jack was given 10% shares in Ewing Oil (5% from J.R. and 5% from Bobby). Jack took them to Wally Wyndam, who told them of some documents that were held by Jock's first wife Amanda. During the trial, the documents proved that Jock did in fact own 100% of Ewing Oil.

During the 1985–86 "Dream Season" [Season 9], Jack started spending time at Ewing Oil helping his cousin J.R. out and acting as a go between for J.R. and his new business partner, J.R.'s former sister-in-law Pam Ewing who decided to keep an eye on J.R. by going to work at Ewing Oil when she inherited Bobby's shares of the company for their son Christopher. During this time Jack also briefly dated Jenna Wade who became mentally unstable due to Bobby's death which ended the romantic part of their relationship. However, once Jenna came to terms with Bobby's death and that he actually wanted to remarry his ex-wife Pam, Jack and Jenna decided to remain friends. Also during this time Jack was pursued by Angelica Nero – CEO of Marinos Shipping. Jack had a striking resemblance to her reclusive employer, Dimitri Marinos. Angelica, with the help of Jack's cousin J.R., persuaded him to pose as Dimitri at a conference in Martinique to convince the company's investors that business was running normally. It was believed that Dimitri's absence was due to illnesses but in fact he was already dead. Meanwhile, Jack and Angelica's assistant, Grace, began to fall in love and eventually Grace betrayed her employer by informing Jack that he would be publicly killed when the job was complete. During the conference, Angelica failed to kill Jack but later she got her revenge by planting a bomb in Jack's car to kill him but it accidentally killed Jamie. However, none of these events actually took place as they were written off as a dream that Pam Ewing had.

In 1986, Jack's former wife, April Stevens, turned up in Dallas to make a claim to half of his 10% of Ewing Oil. April proved that, during their divorce hearing, the judge granted her half of Jack's future income. However, Jack sold his 10% for one dollar to Jamie and presented April with her half – fifty cents. After Jamie died and her will was left unsigned, Jack testifies in court that he sold his shares to Jamie to spite April so she would not benefit from him. The judge orders that April receive her five percent. After this, Jack leaves Dallas and is not seen again.
