= Gwen Arner =

American director and actress (born 1936/37)

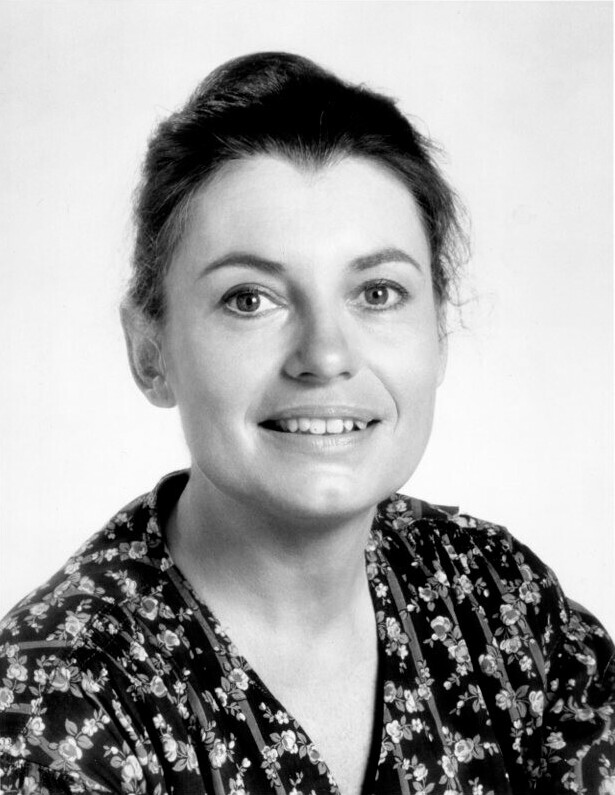
- Born: Gwendolyn Ruth Arner; November 23, 1932 (age 93); McCook, Nebraska, U.S.
- Education: Benson High School; University of Omaha; University of Michigan
- Occupations: Television director; stage director; actress
- Spouse(s): John M. Olson (m. 1955); Donald Moffat (m. 1970; died 2018)
- Children: 4

Gwendolyn Ruth Arner (born November 23, 1932) is an American director and actress. She co-founded the Los Angeles Actors' Theatre and directed stage productions there, as well as at the Mark Taper Forum and in the Midwestern United States. She also directed episodes of The Waltons, Dallas, Falcon Crest, and Dynasty.

== Early life and career ==
Born on November 23, 1932, in McCook, Nebraska, and raised in Omaha, Arner is the daughter of banker John Erwin Arner and his first wife, Mary Alice Trivelpiece. Having gotten her first taste of public performance plus press coverage at age 10 (as one of three "Little Wardens" headlining a World War II-related relief effort), she began studying theater at Omaha's Benson High School, where, during her senior year, Arner starred as Phoebe Throssel / Livvie in a production of J. M. Barrie's Quality Street. She then briefly attended University of Omaha, before transferring to the University of Michigan, where she earned her bachelor's and master's degrees in the field.

After abandoning her initial pursuit of a doctoral degree in favor of stage performance work, Arner made her professional acting debut at the Mark Taper Forum and later co-founded the Los Angeles Actors' Theatre (LAAT), where she marked her directorial debut.

Among her LAAT directing credits are productions of The Kitchen and Waiting for Godot, the latter which was shown at Great Performances on PBS in 1977. Writing for King Features Syndicate, Charles Witbeck praised her Waiting for Godot production as a "lively, joyful version" of the original, saying that "word reached New York that Los Angeles had a Beckett smasher, the "definitive Godot" in the words of an influential critic." Dana Elcar, who starred in the production, also recalled that Arner had "managed the transition without losing touch". Two of her Mark Taper Forum productions, The Vienna Notes (1979) and Passion Play (1984), won the Drama-Logue Award for Outstanding Direction. Passion Play was also nominated for Best Direction at the 1984 Los Angeles Drama Critics Circle Awards. After Passion Play, she stopped doing stage direction work in Los Angeles for a while, preferring work in television films, allowing her to spend more time in New York.

In 1974 she directed one episode of The Waltons, having received an opportunity to do so "through a connection". She later went on to direct episodes of The Bionic Woman, The Paper Chase, American Playhouse, Dallas, The Colbys, Falcon Crest, Dynasty, Hotel, Alien Nation, The Commish, Law & Order, Beverly Hills, 90210, Dr. Quinn, Medicine Woman, Sisters, and Homicide: Life on the Street. She also directed the films My Champion (1981), Please Don't Hit Me, Mom (1981), Mother's Day on Walton's Mountain (1982), My Town (1986), Necessary Parties (1988), Majority Rule (1992), and Something Borrowed, Something Blue (1997).

Although Arner "found directing much more interesting, more stimulating", she also had some acting credits. particularly in The Trial of the Catonsville Nine (1972), A Question of Love (1978), Stickin' Together (1978), and Making Love (1982).

Arner continued her stage direction career in the Midwestern United States. In his review of Northlight Theatre's 1988 U.S. premiere of Karel Capek's The White Plague (an adaptation of The White Disease) in Evanston, Illinois (starring Derek Rhys-Evans, John Gegenhuber, and Bruce A. Young), Tom Valeo said that, as director, she "heightens the impact of the words by encouraging the cast to deliver them without affectation or melodrama". In 1991, she directed the world premiere of Jeremy Lawrence's play Uncommon Ground at the Northlight Theatre in Evanston, Illinois, starring her husband Donald Moffat and Anna Gunn.

Writing for the Los Angeles Times, Jan Breslauer wrote in 1996 that Arner "has accomplished what few women in her generation – or any generation, for that matter – have. At 59, she's had a successful directing career in both theater and television for more than 20 years."

== Personal life ==
In July 1955, Arner married fellow University of Michigan speech major and graduate student, John M. Olson. Judging from an item later published in the Stamford Advocate, they remained married for eight years.

In 1969, she married Donald Moffat, who was one of the LAAT's co-founders; they raised their four children and would remain married until Moffat's death on December 20, 2018.

== Filmography ==
=== As director ===
Television
Year	Title	Notes	Ref.
1978	The Bionic Woman	1 episode	
1978	The Paper Chase	1 episode	
1980	The Waltons	13 episodes	
1984	American Playhouse	1 episode	
1984	Dallas	5 episodes	
1986	The Colbys	2 episodes	
1986	Falcon Crest	8 episodes	
1987	Dynasty	11 episodes	
1988	Hotel	1 episode	
1990	Alien Nation	2 episodes	
1991	The Commish	1 episode	
1991	Law & Order	2 episodes	
1993	Beverly Hills, 90210	1 episode	
1993	Dr. Quinn, Medicine Woman	1 episode	
1993	Sisters	2 episodes	
1996	Homicide: Life on the Street	1 episode	

Film
Year	Title	Ref.
1981	My Champion	
1981	Please Don't Hit Me, Mom	
1982	Mother's Day on Walton's Mountain	
1986	My Town	
1988	Necessary Parties	
1992	Majority Rule	
1997	Something Borrowed, Something Blue	

=== As actress ===
Year	Title	Role	Ref.
1972	The Trial of the Catonsville Nine	Marjorie Melville	
1978	A Question of Love		
1978	Stickin' Together	Miss Steigler	
1982	Making Love	Arlene	

== Awards and nominations ==
Year	Title	Award	Result	Ref.
1979	The Vienna Notes	Drama-Logue Award for Outstanding Direction	Won	
1984	Passion Play	Drama-Logue Award for Outstanding Direction	Won	
1984	Passion Play	Los Angeles Drama Critics Circle Award for Best Direction	Nominated	
