= David Paulsen (producer) =

American television screenwriter

David Paulsen is an American television screenwriter, director and producer best known for his work on 1980s prime time soap operas Dallas (1980–1985, 1986–1988), Knots Landing (1980–1981, 1985–1986), and Dynasty (1988–1989). He also wrote and directed the slasher films Savage Weekend (1976) and Schizoid (1980).

== Credits ==
- Dallas (1980–1985, 1986–1988)
- Knots Landing (1980–1981, 1985–1986)
- Dynasty (1988–1989)
- Dangerous Curves (1992–1993)
