= Arthur Bernard Lewis =

American screenwriter

- Born: January 26, 1926; New York City, New York, U.S.
- Died: October 30, 2010 (aged 84); Sherman Oaks, California, U.S.
- Occupations: Television writer and producer
- Notable work: Dallas
- Spouse: Marjorie Estelle Lewis

Arthur Bernard Lewis (January 26, 1926 – October 30, 2010) was an American television writer and producer. He wrote sixty-nine episodes of the CBS oil soap opera Dallas and was the supervising producer of over one hundred episodes of the show.

== Life and career ==
Born and raised in New York City, he wrote episodes for many popular television shows, which included Hawaii Five-0 and various other prime-time TV series before settling on Dallas. He also worked on the ABC daytime soap series General Hospital. He was hired by Gloria Monty & Norma Monty to be a writer on General Hospital in 1991.

Lewis began his career in 1962 as a producer on TV's The Doctors and the Nurses, then moved into high gear by writing episodes of such popular programs as ABC-TV's The Streets of San Francisco, CBS-TV's Barnaby Jones, ABC-TV's Baretta, Hawaii Five-O and In the Heat of the Night.

In 1978, he joined the production team of the new CBS-TV miniseries Dallas (now officially recognized as the series' first season), and would serve as executive story editor for 69 episodes of the nighttime drama series. From 1981–85, Lewis was supervising producer of 113 segments and the sole writer of 63 one-hour episodes, most of which he produced as well.

Lewis worked on the "Who Shot J.R.?" episode that aired on Nov. 21, 1980, and revealed J.R. Ewing's shooter. It was the highest-rated TV episode in history at the time, seen by an estimated 83 million viewers. After the show ended its regular run in 1991, Lewis came back to write the scripts for the TV movies Dallas: J.R. Returns (1996) and Dallas: War of the Ewings (1998).

== Death ==
Lewis died of complications from pneumonia in 2010 at age 84 in Sherman Oaks Hospital in Sherman Oaks, California, as his family had announced.
