= Dirty Sally =

1974 American Western television series

- Genre: Western
- Created by: Jack Miller
- Starring: Jeanette Nolan; Dack Rambo
- Country of origin: United States
- Original language: English
- No. of seasons: 1
- No. of episodes: 14 (1 unaired)

Production
- Producers: John Mantley; Leonard Katzman
- Running time: 30-minute episodes
- Production company: CBS Productions

Original release
- Network: CBS
- Release: January 11 – April 19, 1974

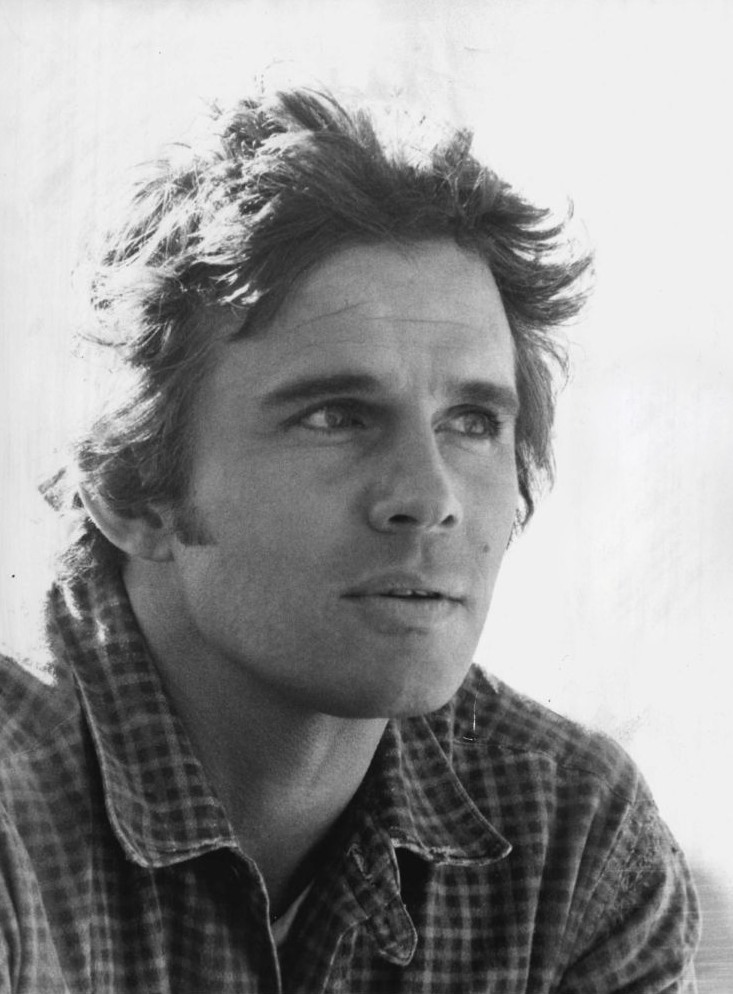
Dack Rambo stars as Cyrus Pike

Dirty Sally is a humorous Western television series about a hard-drinking cantankerous old woman and a young former outlaw traveling to the California gold fields in a wagon pulled by a mule named Worthless. The series consists of 14 half-hour episodes that aired on CBS Fridays, 8:00 to 8:30 p.m., from January 11, 1974, to July 19, 1974. Jeanette Nolan stars as Sally Fergus and Dack Rambo stars as Cyrus Pike in this Gunsmoke spin-off. Guest stars include Jackie Coogan and Kathleen Cody. Nolan's husband, John McIntire, and her son, Tim McIntire, also had guest roles. Nolan was nominated for an Emmy Award for her role in the series.

== Synopsis ==
During the 16th season of Gunsmoke, a two-part episode titled "Pike" was broadcast on March 1 and March 8, 1971. Dirty Sally, an old woman who collected bottles and other discarded items to sell, found outlaw Cyrus Pike, who had been shot. Sally nursed Pike back to health and tried to protect him from the men who wanted him dead. According to TV Guide reviewer Cleveland Amory the Gunsmoke office "received more mail on that episode than any other segment in the series' 19 years". The character of Dirty Sally was brought back during the next season of Gunsmoke in an episode titled "One for the Road". The character was spun off into a new series.

In the series Pike is anxious to reach California, but the journey is often delayed by Sally becoming involved with the problems of people they meet.

== Production ==
Dirty Sally was produced by the CBS Television Network at the CBS Studio Center in Hollywood. John Mantley was the executive producer, Leonard Katzman the producer, and Jack Miller was creator and story consultant. All three were on the production team for Gunsmoke.

== Episodes ==
No.	Title	Directed by	Written by	Original release date	Prod. code
1	"Right of Way"	Vincent McEveety	Calvin Clements, Sr.	January 11, 1974	001
Sally protects a pig farmer (John McIntire) from a land-grabbing railroad baron.
2	"The Orphans"	Philip Leacock	Dale Eunson	January 18, 1974	006
Worthless the mule is stolen by a six-year old boy. Sally and Pike learn the boy and his four siblings have been abandoned and are homeless.
3	"The Old Soldier"	Irving Moore	Charles A. McDaniel	January 25, 1974	002
Thoughts of marriage enter Sally's head when she meets an old friend who's turned to alcohol after he was forced to retire from the cavalry and who feels life has no meaning.
4	"Convict"	Don Weis	Jim Byrnes	February 1, 1974	003
An escaped convict strikes a deal with Sally and Pike – he'll let them turn him in for a reward if they'll help him visit his wife who's about to give birth.
5	"Horse of a Different Color"	Irving Moore	Leonard Katzman	February 8, 1974	004
Denver Pyle plays a foxy old horse trader Pike is trying to outfox.
6	"Too Long to Wait"	Philip Leacock	Jack Miller	February 15, 1974	012
A blind old woman is waiting for the return of her long-overdue grandson. Sally and Pike suspect he'll never come back.
7	"All That Glitters"	Irrving Moore	Leonard Katzman	February 22, 1974	005
A beautiful card sharp pretends to be a damsel in distress to take advantage of gullible Pike.
8	"Much Ado About Nothing"	Unknown	Unknown	March 8, 1974	007
Pike prepares for his acting debut in a melodrama and grows so conceited Sally wonders how she'll put up with him.
9	"Wimmen's Rights"	Irving Moore	Calvin Clements, Sr.	March 15, 1974	008
Sally starts a fight for women's rights after being ejected from a men-only saloon.
10	"I Never Saw the Pacific"	Irving Moore	Leonard Katzman	March 22, 1974	009
A critically ill preacher thinks he's dying and asks Sally to tell his congregation he was never ordained. Trouble starts when the preacher recovers.
11	"My Fair Laddie"	Leonard Katzman	Jay Simms & Denver Pyle	March 29, 1974	010
Sally raises the ire of a moonshiner when she converts his tomboy daughter into a beautiful lady.
12	"The Hanging of Cyrus Pike"	Irving Moore	Calvin Clements, Sr.	April 5, 1974	011
Pike is framed as a horse thief and sentenced to be hanged. Jackie Coogan plays the sheriff.
13	"Honk 'Em, Squonk 'Em, Git the Wampum"	Don Haldane	George Salverson	April 19, 1974	013
Sally pretends she's the mother of Billy the Kid to teach a lesson to a gang of crooked poker players.
14	"I Don't, I Don't"	N/A	Earl Barret	Unaired	014
Sally is accused by Sheriff Maxwell of being a cattle rustler.
