= Mesannie Wilkins =

American saddle tramp (1891–1980)

Annie "Mesannie" Wilkins
- Born: Annie Mabel Stuart; December 13, 1891; Maine, USA
- Died: February 19, 1980 (aged 88); Whitefield, Maine, USA
- Resting place: Maple Grove Cemetery, Mechanic Falls, Maine, USA
- Occupation: Farmer

Annie "Mesannie" Wilkins (1891–1980) was a 63-year-old farmer who made national headlines by traveling over 5,000 miles across the United States from Maine to California with a retired race horse named Tarzan, a packhorse named Rex, and a dog named Depeche Toi (French for "Hurry Up").

== Personal life ==
Wilkins was born Annie Mabel Stuart in Minot, Maine on December 13, 1891, to James Stuart and Sarah Libby Stuart; who were early settlers of the area of German, Scottish and English descent. Her family lived on a farm that her grandfather started in Woodman Hill, West Minot. Wilkins dropped out of school by the sixth grade to help run the farm. When she turned of age, it was said that Wilkins ran away from home and joined the circus as a bareback rider, only to return home when she learned that her mother had taken ill. When her father died, Wilkins's mother took up with his brother, Waldo. During times when the farm could not sustain them, Wilkins and her mother took jobs at a shoe shop in Lewiston, Maine. Wilkins rode a donkey to and from work, thus earning the nickname "Jackass Annie".

In September 1954, while battling a bout of pneumonia, Wilkins not only lost her only surviving family member, Uncle Waldo (who was 85 and blind), she was also diagnosed with either tuberculosis or cancer and given just two years to live by her doctor. As Wilkins had to sell off all her livestock to pay medical bills, the doctor, realizing Wilkins was "dirt poor", offered to get her into a state-funded retirement home. The farm house built by her grandfather had burned down and Wilkins was now living in an outbuilding used for storage.

== Journey across America ==
After the death of Waldo in September 1954, Wilkins raised $32 by selling homemade pickles and mortgaging her home enough to buy supplies and a horse. Her mother had always wished to visit California, so, in her memory, Wilkins decided to journey there and "take a dip in it." Before setting out, Wilkins flipped a coin and asked God if she should make the journey. When the coin came up heads several times in a row, she began her travels. On November 8, 1954 at the age of 63, Wilkins left her home in Minot with two horses, one named Tarzan, a former race horse purchased at a nearby summer camp, the other named Rex, and her dog, Depeche Toi, which means "Hurry Up", or "Toby" for short. She left in November with the idea that the weather would warm as they headed further south. However, New England and states south of Maine still proved to be experiencing winter for several months thereafter.

According to columnist Linda Caroll, Wilkins did not "act like a lady" in "polite society". "She didn’t act like women were supposed to," writes Caroll. "[She] didn’t dress like a lady. Too loud. Too brash. Divorced twice, too." Biographer Elizabeth Letts claims that Wilkins was only married once, "at least". Lindsay Tice writes, "[She was] a woman who liked to wear pants and speak her mind, she wasn’t well regarded by local folks at the time. Some breathed a sigh of relief when she left." Hester Gilpatrick, a neighbor, recalls Wilkins in a news interview for WCVB-TV: "I remember seeing her have temper tantrums, I don't know how many times. [When she left] I said, 'good riddance!'"

Wilkins tied feed pails to her horse (hoping people along the way would be generous and provide food) and a bedroll for herself. As news spread of her journey, people would offer food and a place to sleep for Wilkins and her horses. Small towns let her sleep in their jails, while fancier hotels would offer her free room and board. Sometimes people would give Wilkins money, and a farmer even gave her a free spare horse. Journalists and newspapermen greeted her in various towns and invited her to lunch with the intent to write her story. In Missouri, a school asked her to come and speak to the students about her journey. On one occasion, a printer printed self-portraits and postcards created by Wilkins which she sold to admirers for spending money. The postcards displayed inspirational quotes, such as: "Don’t look back; that’s not where you’re going." As news spread of her travels, each town expected her arrival and Wilkins was often given a police escort. “I felt like Lindbergh from Paris, but I must have looked more like Buffalo Bill’s wife," she said.

Mesannie Wilkins on You Bet Your Life, with Groucho Marx

Journeying through Massachusetts, Wilkins was treated to a full Thanksgiving meal. In Springfield, the hotel where she stayed displayed a sign that read: "Washington Slept Here". When they left, the private box stall that Tarzan had slept in displayed a sign which read: "Tarzan Slept Here." While in Chadds Ford, Pennsylvania, she met a man who was making a painting of her horse, Tarzan, as she went outside to saddle him up. Wilkins complimented him on his drawing and the gentleman thanked her and said his name was Andrew. It wasn't until years later that she discovered the man was American artist Andrew Wyeth. The Chadds Ford Historical Society varies in this retelling by saying that Wyeth specifically came to meet Wilkins and her traveling companions; and furthermore states that Wyeth and Wilkins got drunk together. She met other celebrities along her journey, including Art Linkletter (with whom she dined and appeared on his television program, Art Linkletter’s House Party) and Groucho Marx, appearing on his American comedy quiz show You Bet Your Life on October 18, 1956. In August 1955, Wilkins arrived in Cheyenne, Wyoming and experienced their annual "Frontier Days", which claimed to have the largest rodeos in the world.

When Wilkins at last reached the Pacific Ocean, she said a prayer to her mother. She arrived with Tarzan and Depeche Toi by her side; and a new pack horse named King; Rex had died only 180 miles (290 km) short of their destination in Tulare, California from tetanus. Throughout her journey, Wilkins escaped the bite of a cottonmouth snake, being trampled by a herd of cattle, a flash flood, and even a marriage proposal from an elderly goat herder in Wyoming, although one source said the farmer proposed in Arkansas. She experienced blistering desert heat, freezing and blinding snowstorms, and unfamiliar, dangerous terrain. Wilkins spent two years in California. "I'd like to go back the same way," Wilkins told a reporter for The San Bernardino Sun Journal. "But I'm not planning to go right back," said Wilkins, "Now that I'm out here I'd like to take two or three years to look around."

Wilkins returned to Maine in 1957. A local resident of Minot noted: "When Mes Annie returned to Minot, she was wearing a dress, a hat, and gloves – Ma didn’t even recognize her!” Wilkins did not resume residence in Minot. The State had seized her farm for back taxes. Instead she moved in with her friend, Mina Titus Sawyer in Whitefield, Maine, where she lived the remainder of her life. A decade after returning to Maine, Wilkins wrote and published a book in 1967 from the journals she had kept, called Last of the Saddle Tramps — a 7,000-mile Equestrian Odyssey through the USA. Her friend Mina served as collaborator, and Art Linkletter wrote the foreword.

Wilkins died on Tuesday, February 19, 1980, in Whitefield, Maine. She was 88 years old. She was buried in her family plot in Maple Grove Cemetery in Minot, Maine. Her gravestone reads Last of the Saddle Tramps – Mesannie L. Wilkins.

That's the thing about the future. You can't get there by imagining. You can only get there one step at a time, and the hardest part is taking that first step.

— Annie Wilkins

== Discrepancies ==
Certain references claim that Wilkins' father and her "Uncle Waldo" were biological brothers; while others state that Waldo was a farmhand hired to work alongside her father.

Varying sources claim that Wilkins traveled between 4,000, 5,000 and 7,000 miles (6,437, 8,047 and 11,265 km) across the United States. Similarly, sources vary on how long the trip took. Some say Wilkins arrived in Redding, California, in December 1955, others state 17 months (502 days) with an exact date of Thursday, March 22, 1956; while others assert a year and some days. While being interviewed on You Bet Your Life, Wilkins told Groucho Marx that her trip took "Pretty near two years."

Obituaries at the time of Wilkins's death announced that she died at the Country Manor Nursing Home in Coopers Mills, Maine, where she had been a patient since 1979; while others say that she died in Whitefield, Maine.

== Bibliography ==
- Wilkins, Mesannie (1967). Sawyer, Mina Titus (collaborator). Last of the Saddle Tramps. Prentice Hall, Inc. Englewood Cliffs, NJ. Foreword by Art Linkletter.
- Letts, Elizabeth (June 7, 2022). The Ride of Her Life: The True Story of a Woman, Her Horse, and Their Last-Chance Journey Across America. Random House Publishing Group. ISBN 978-0525619345.
