= Goliath Awaits =

1981 American made-for-television mini-series by Kevin Connor

- Genre: Action; Adventure; Drama; Romance; Sci-Fi; Thriller
- Written by: Richard Bluel; Pat Fielder
- Directed by: Kevin Connor
- Starring: Mark Harmon; Christopher Lee; Eddie Albert; John Carradine; Alex Cord; Robert Forster; Frank Gorshin; Jean Marsh; John McIntire; Emma Samms
- Music by: George Duning
- Country of origin: United States
- Original language: English

Production
- Executive producer: Larry White
- Producers: Hugh Benson; Richard M. Bluel; Pat Fielder
- Production locations: RMS Queen Mary - 1126 Queens Highway, Long Beach, California; Edinburgh, Scotland; North Sea; Warner Brothers Burbank Studios - 4000 Warner Boulevard, Burbank, California
- Cinematography: Al Francis
- Editors: J. Terry Williams; Donald Douglas
- Running time: ~200 min (original); 110 min (VHS/laserdisc)
- Production companies: Larry White Productions; Gay-Jay Production; Columbia Pictures Television; Operation Prime Time
- Budget: $4 million

Original release
- Network: Syndication
- Release: November 16 – November 17, 1981

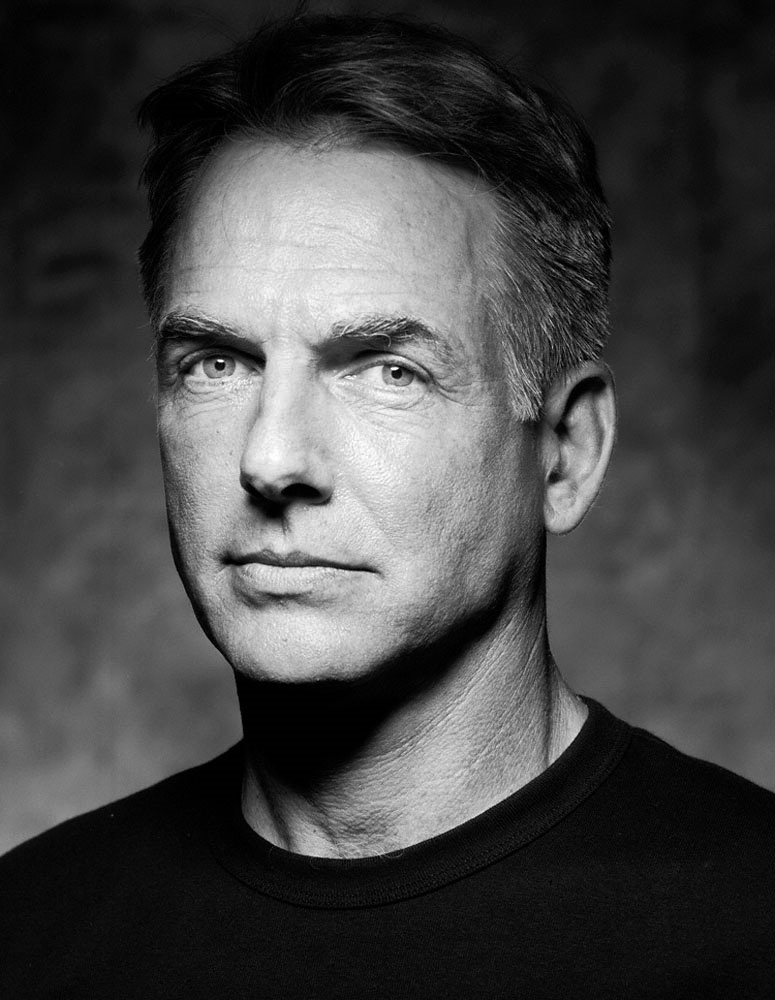
American actor Mark Harmon photographed by Jerry Avenaim for TV Guide in 2005.

Goliath Awaits is a 1981 American made-for-television action adventure science fiction thriller film originally broadcast in two parts in November 1981 on various stations as a part of Operation Prime Time's syndicated programming. It is about an ocean liner sunk by a German U-boat in 1939 whose wreck is discovered in 1981, with over 300 survivors and their descendants living in an air bubble inside the ship.

== Plot ==
On September 4, 1939, the British ocean liner RMS Goliath, carrying 1,860 passengers, is torpedoed by a German U-boat and sinks within minutes while on a transatlantic crossing to the United States three days after the outbreak of war.

Scientists aboard a research ship in 1981 discover the wreck of the Goliath lying upright in 1,000 feet (305 m) of water, and divers are sent down to investigate the wreck. Oceanographer Peter Cabot (Mark Harmon) hears systematic banging and music coming from the ship and is shocked to see the face of a beautiful young woman (Emma Samms) inside a porthole. Cabot and his colleagues discover 337 people, survivors and their descendants, living in an air bubble in the wreck caused by the vessel's having slowly sunk in relatively shallow water. The residents of Goliath, who have invented some technologies to help them survive, some not even known to the outside modern world, live in a superficially utopian society under the autocratic leadership of John McKenzie (Christopher Lee), a junior officer at the time of the sinking credited with saving a sizable number of passengers and crew. The scientists are surprised to discover that McKenzie and some of the ship's residents are not at all interested in being "rescued", and that there are outcasts and rebels opposed to McKenzie's seemingly beneficent leadership, which also includes brutal discipline, mandatory contraception, euthanasia, and outright murder disguised as a mysterious disease.

Complicating things, the Goliath had been carrying some sensitive documents to President Roosevelt. A joint American/British military team is sent by Admiral Wiley Sloan (Eddie Albert) to retrieve and destroy the documents.

== Principal cast ==
- Mark Harmon as Peter Cabot
- Christopher Lee as John McKenzie
- Eddie Albert as Admiral Wiley Sloan
- John Carradine as Ronald Bentley
- Alex Cord as Dr. Sam Marlowe
- Robert Forster as Commander Jeff Selkirk
- Frank Gorshin as Dan Wesker
- Jean Marsh as Dr. Goldman
- John McIntire as Senator Oliver Bartholemew
- Jeanette Nolan as Mrs. Bartholomew
- Duncan Regehr as Paul Ryker
- Emma Samms as Lea McKenzie
- Kirk Cameron as Liam
- Lori Lethin as Maria
- John Ratzenberger as Bill Sweeney

== Production ==
Richard Bluel and Pat Fielder developed the premise in the early 1960s when rumors of the Titanic's discovery led to a discussion of what if the passengers had survived on the sunken wreckage, laying the initial foundation for the premise.

The interiors of Goliath were principally filmed on location aboard the RMS Queen Mary in California.
