= Peege =

- Directed by: Randal Kleiser
- Written by: Randal Kleiser
- Produced by: Leonard S. Berman; David Knapp
- Starring: Bruce Davison; Barbara Rush; Jeanette Nolan; William Schallert; David Alan Bailey; Barry Livingston
- Cinematography: Douglas Knapp
- Edited by: Randal Kleiser
- Music by: Charles Albertine
- Distributed by: Phoenix/BFA Films & Video
- Release date: October 1973
- Running time: 28 minutes
- Country: United States
- Language: English
- Budget: c. $10,000
- Box office: c.$2 million

Peege is a 1973 American short student film, written and directed by Randal Kleiser, about a family's visit to an elderly relative in a nursing home.

In 2007, The film was selected for preservation in the National Film Registry by the United States Library of Congress, for being "culturally, historically, or aesthetically significant".

== Synopsis ==
An elderly woman, nicknamed "Peege" and played by Jeanette Nolan, lives in a nursing home where she is suffering from blindness and ailing mental faculties. Her family makes regular visits to her every Christmas, but her poor health makes these occasions awkward for everyone else. The conversation is awkward, because most of the family treat Peege in a condescending fashion and talk about their own successes. As the family goes to leave, one of the grandsons (Bruce Davison) remains behind briefly. He recounts to his grandmother that when he was a young boy her laugh would "always make [him] happy", before tearfully departing, unaware if he has communicated with her. After his exit, the camera lingers on her face and her expression subtly shows he was successful.

== History ==
After graduating from University of Southern California, Kleiser had struggled creatively while making educational films, and at the behest of his father he returned to college to earn his Master's degree. In the film he originally planned as his thesis, a Los Angeles theater company puts on an experimental play about a time traveller. However, he had intended to supplement the picture with special effects, but if he did so the consequent budget would be $5,000 more than he could afford; he would only be able to complete it by renting equipment from USC and ceding the copyright to them. Unwilling to lose ownership of his movie, he instead followed the advice of producer Curtis Harrington, who suggested he abandon the project in favor of a more personal and intimate subject. He chose to write about his own family's visits to his grandmother, also nicknamed "Peege", when she was in a nursing home in Pennsylvania. Each trip found her in poorer health, to the point where, according to Kleiser, he "dreaded visiting". The family's final journey to see her served as the inspiration for the script.

== Production ==
There were no problems during shooting, and indeed the production enjoyed more than its share of good fortune. Producer David Knapp was also working on a CBS television movie at the same time (Steven Spielberg's Something Evil), and since that film had wrapped ahead of schedule, the Peege crew were able to get access to the studio offices for the remaining two weeks of the lease without any cost. Next door to those offices was the studio for the television series Gunsmoke, and Jeanette Nolan, a guest-star on the show, was approached to play the role of the grandmother. Lead actor Bruce Davison had enjoyed recent success as the star of The Strawberry Statement and Willard, but liked the script enough that he agreed to participate for only the Screen Actors Guild statutory minimum wage, and a small share of any profits.

== Reception ==
Prior to its inclusion in the National Film Registry, Peege had already won several awards, including a Chris Award at the Columbus Film Festival, the top honor at the National Council on Family Relations Film Competition, a Media & Methods Recommended Citation: Maxi Award, and a TEAM Film Award for the Best Film in Family Counseling.

== See also ==
- List of American films of 1973
