= Charles Wright (poet) =

American writer; University of Virginia professor

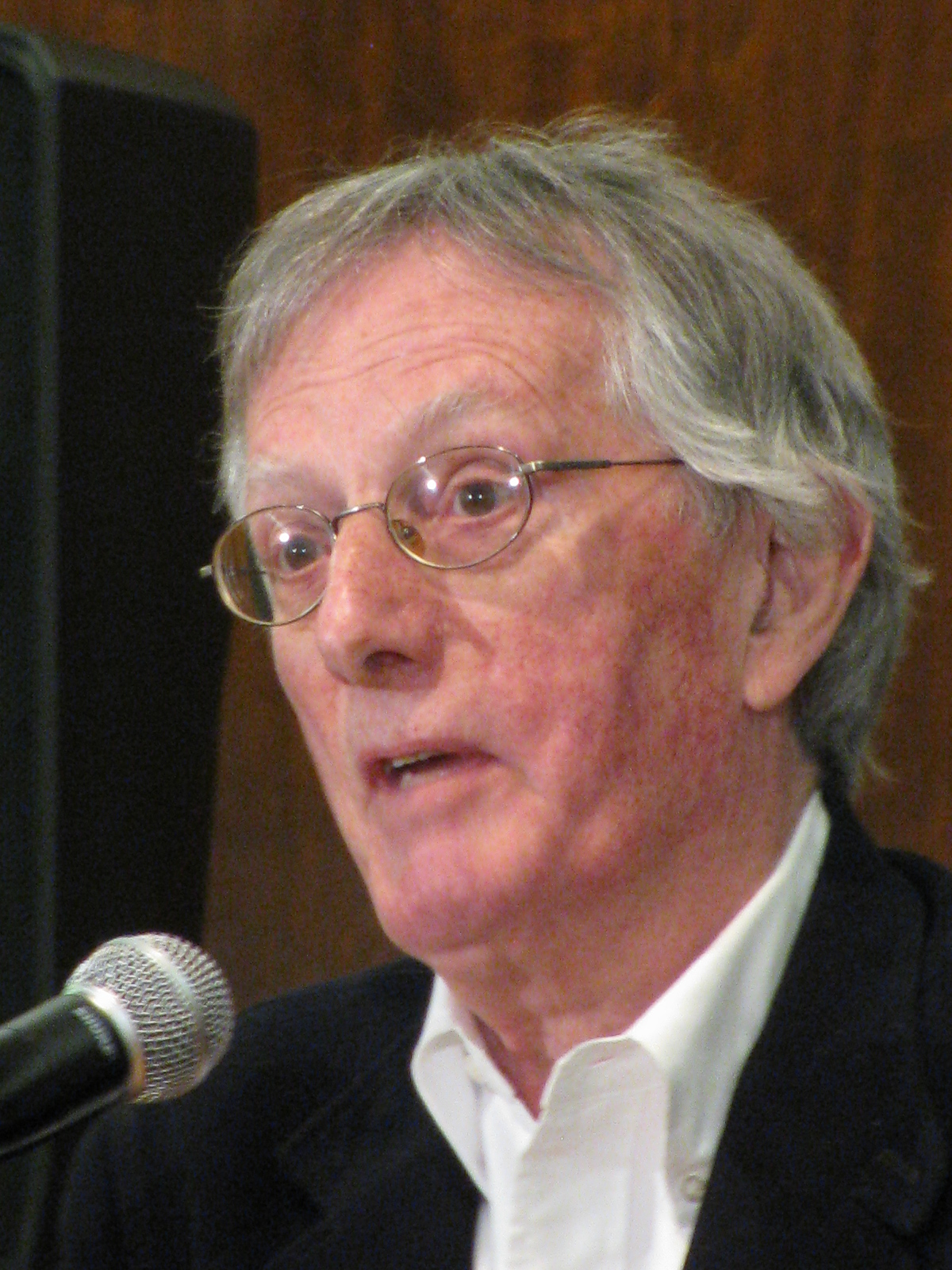
- Born: August 25, 1935 (age 90) Pickwick Dam, Tennessee, U.S.
- Education: Davidson College (BA); University of Iowa (MFA)
- Genre: Poetry
- Notable awards: Pulitzer Prize for Poetry; National Book Award for Poetry
- Spouse: Holly McIntire

United States Poet Laureate
- In office 2014–2015
- Preceded by: Natasha Trethewey
- Succeeded by: Juan Felipe Herrera

Charles Wright (born August 25, 1935) is an American poet. He shared the National Book Award in 1983 for Country Music: Selected Early Poems and won the Pulitzer Prize in 1998 for Black Zodiac. From 2014 to 2015, he served as the 20th poet laureate of the United States.

== Early life and education ==
Wright was born in Pickwick Dam, Tennessee. Wright attended Christ School (North Carolina) in Asheville for his junior and senior years where he helped coach football, served as vice president of his class, and became a member of the honors program. While at Christ School, he enveloped himself in the literature that would inspire him to write. By the time he graduated in 1953, he had read everything William Faulkner had written. He then matriculated at Davidson College and graduated with a BA in history in 1957. He received a master's degree from the University of Iowa in 1963, and attended the University of Iowa Writers' Workshop. He was a Fulbright Scholar at the Sapienza University of Rome and at the University of Padua.

== Teaching career ==
From 1966 to 1983, he taught at the University of California, Irvine. Fellow Colleagues poets Robert Peters and James L. McMichael and novelist Oakley Hall shared during this time directorship of the university's well-known Master of Fine Arts program. He went to the University of Virginia in 1983, where he stayed until he retired in 2010.

He was a chancellor of the Academy of American Poets and Souder Family Professor of English at the University of Virginia in Charlottesville.

== Poet ==
Wright began writing poetry while stationed in Italy during his army service, from 1957 to 1961, in the United States Army Intelligence Corps in Verona. On June 12, 2014, the Library of Congress announced that Wright would serve as Poet Laureate of the United States beginning on September 25, 2014. He retired from the position in May 2015.

== Works ==
Besides the award-winning books Country Music (1982) and Black Zodiac (1997), Wright has published Chickamauga, Buffalo Yoga, Negative Blue, Appalachia, The World of the Ten Thousand Things: Poems 1980-1990, Zone Journals and Hard Freight. His work also appears in Blackbird, an online journal of literature and the arts.

Wright has published two works of criticism, Halflife and Quarter Notes.

== Recognition ==
His translation of Eugenio Montale's The Storm and Other Poems won him the PEN Translation Prize in 1979. In 1993, he received the Ruth Lilly Poetry Prize for his lifetime achievement. His poetry collection The World of the Ten Thousand Things was included by critic Harold Bloom in his list of works constituting the Western Canon. In 1996, he won the Lenore Marshall Poetry Prize from the Academy of American Poets for the collection Chickamauga (1995). Black Zodiac (1997) won him the National Book Critics Circle Award and the 1998 Pulitzer Prize.

== Bibliography ==
- The Dream Animal House of Anansi Press, 1968.
- The Grave of the Right Hand Wesleyan University Press, 1970.
- The Venice Notebook Barn Dream Press, 1971.
- Hard Freight Wesleyan University Press, 1973.
- Bloodlines Wesleyan University Press, 1975.
- China Trace Wesleyan University Press, 1977.
- Colophons Windhover Press, 1977.
- The Storm and Other Things Eugenio Montale (translations) Field Editions, 1978.
- The Southern Cross Random House, 1981. — finalist, 1982 Pulitzer Prize for Poetry
- Country Music: Selected Early Poems (Wesleyan University Press, 1982) — shared the National Book Award for Poetry with Galway Kinnell, Selected Poems; finalist, 1983 Pulitzer Prize for Poetry
- Orphic Songs. Dino Campana (translations) Field Editions, 1984.
- The Other Side of the River. Random House 1984. — finalist, 1985 Pulitzer Prize for Poetry
- Halflife (improvisations and interviews) U of Michigan Press, 1988.
- Zone Journals Farrar, Straus & Giroux, 1988.
- The World of the Ten Thousand Things. Farrar, Straus & Giroux, 1990.
- Xionia Windhover Press, 1990.
- Chickamauga Farrar, Straus & Giroux, 1995. — finalist, 1996 Pulitzer Prize for Poetry
- Quarter Notes (improvisations and interviews) U of Michigan Press, 1995.
- Black Zodiac Farrar, Straus & Giroux, 1997. — winner of the 1998 Pulitzer Prize for Poetry
- Appalachia Farrar, Straus & Giroux, 1998.
- North American Bear Sutton Hoo, 1999.
- Negative Blue Farrar, Straus & Giroux, 2000.
- A Short History of the Shadow Farrar, Straus & Giroux, 2002.
- Buffalo Yoga Farrar, Straux & Giroux, 2004.
- The Wrong End of the Rainbow Sarabande, 2005.
- Scar Tissue Farrar, Straus & Giroux, 2006. — winner of the 2007 International Griffin Poetry Prize
- Littlefoot. New York: Farrar, Straus and Giroux. 2007. ISBN 9780374189662. Archived from the original on 2023-10-06.
- Sestets Farrar, Straus & Giroux, 2009.
- Outtakes Sarabande, 2010.
- Bye-and-Bye: Selected Late Poems Farrar, Straus & Giroux, 2012. — winner of the 2013 Bollingen Prize
- Caribou, Farrar, Straus and Giroux, 2014.
- Oblivion Banjo: The Poetry of Charles Wright, Farrar, Straus and Giroux, 2019.
