= Oshima Brothers =

American folk-pop duo

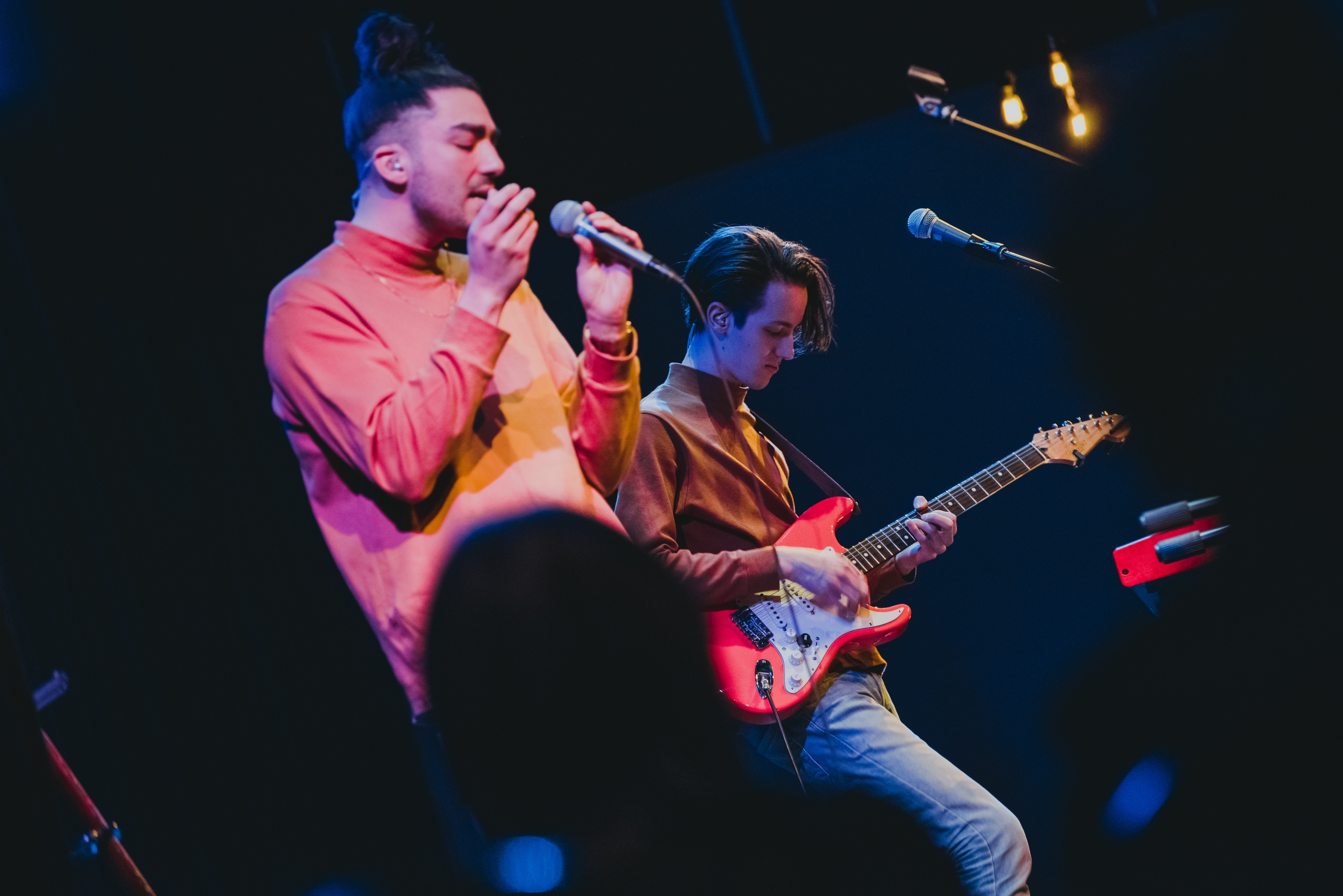
- At the Marathon Center for the Performing Arts in Findlay, Ohio, January 2022

Background information
- Origin: Whitefield, Maine, U.S.
- Genres: Pop, folk
- Years active: 2015–present
- Label: Oshima Brothers Music
- Members: Sean Oshima, Jamie Oshima
- Website: www.oshimabrothers.com

Oshima Brothers is an American folk-pop duo known for both members playing multiple instruments and looping their own samples on stage to create a complex soundscape that suggests a larger ensemble. The duo divides responsibilities according to individual strengths, with Sean handling external communications and songwriting, and Jamie focusing on mixing and production. Nearly every song is accompanied by a music video, which they produce themselves.

As siblings raised by American folk musician parents in rural Maine, Sean and Jamie Oshima are self-taught musicians who started singing and playing music together as young children. Performing together as a band since 2015, they attracted a fan base within Maine following the release of their eponymous debut album in 2016. They developed a larger national audience with their 2019 EP Under the Same Stars and subsequent national tours. Though the COVID-19 pandemic kept them from performing live for over a year, they put out a second EP, Sunset Red, in 2020 and returned to touring in 2021. They released their second album Dark Nights Golden Days in April 2022, by which time they had over 115,000 Spotify followers and almost five million streams on the platform of their song "These Cold Nights". This is accompanied by a visual album of the same name released the following October. In April 2025, the duo released an EP of five songs: Can You Feel the Sun Returning.

== Career ==
Sometimes described as "a self-made boy band", Oshima Brothers officially formed in 2015. They released their first album the following year, when Sean was twenty-two and Jamie was nineteen. By 2018, the duo had developed a following throughout Maine and they started working with booking and marketing agents around this time as well.

The brothers started touring nationally after the release of their 2019 EP, Under the Same Stars. That year, their song "Ellie" was featured on the NPR Music Heavy Rotation ten-song playlist and "These Cold Nights" reached one million streams on Spotify. They are the third musical group from Maine to reach that goal. Before Under the Same Stars, the duo had fewer than 1,000 monthly listeners on Spotify. By April 2020, they had over 100,000.

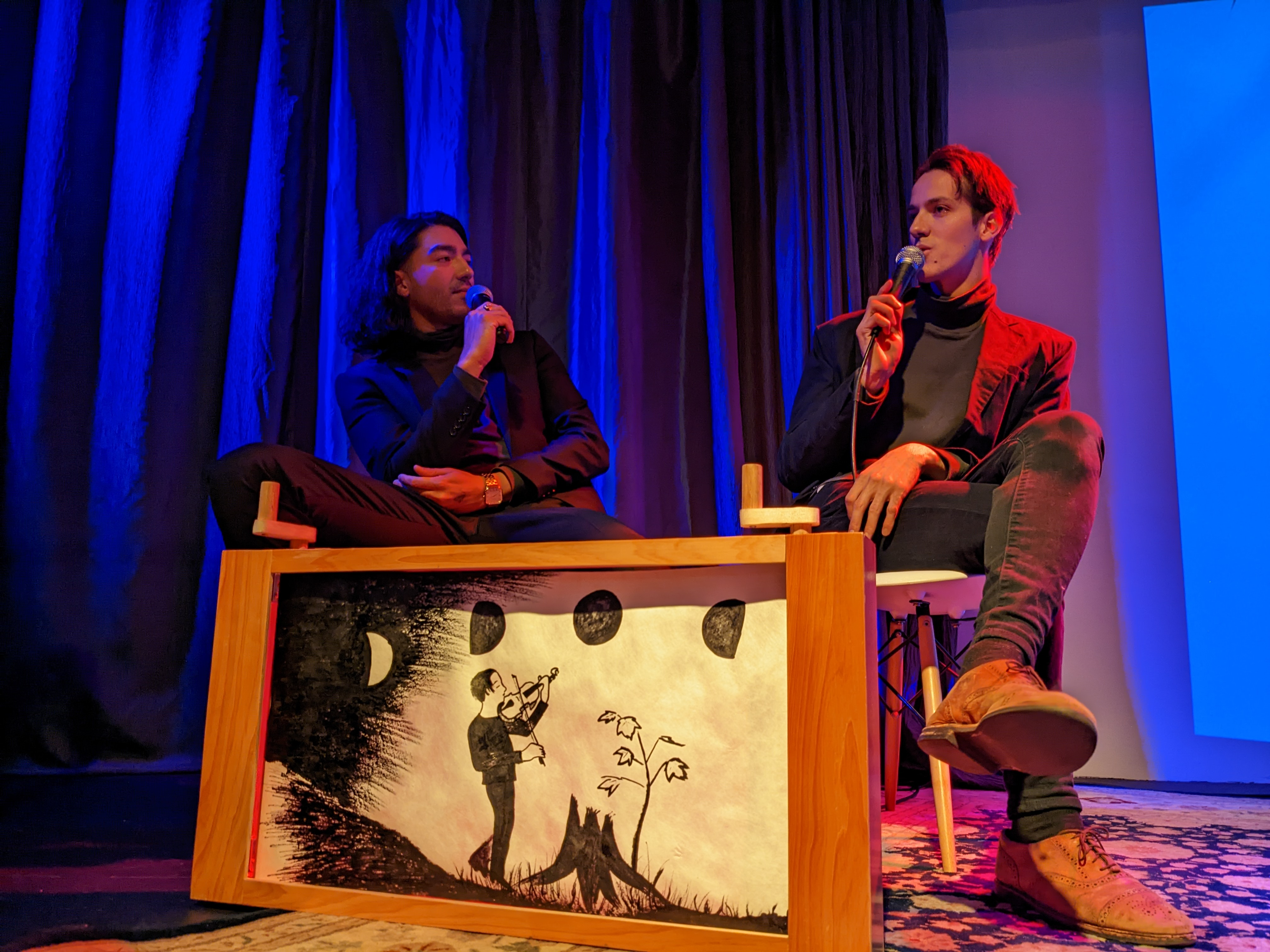
Premier of Dark Nights Golden Days visual album, October 2022

Oshima Brothers had planned their biggest tour for 2020 when the COVID-19 pandemic caused all concert dates to be canceled. Organizers across the country canceled over thirty of their concerts in 2020 and the duo played no live performances from March 2020 until summer 2021. According to Sean: "We lost a gigantic tour and really all income — but we couldn't let it stop us". The brothers focused on recording new songs, producing music videos, and releasing their second EP, Sunset Red, in late summer 2020. They also performed livestream concerts for audiences in multiple states.

The duo returned to touring in 2021 with their first concert outside Maine since the start of the pandemic in May of that year, followed by performances across the Northeast. On March 18, 2022, "Lost at Sea" from Under the Same Stars was featured on episode 765 of This American Life. On April 1, Oshima Brothers released their second album Dark Nights Golden Days, which combined their digital EPs Dark and Golden, plus seven new tracks. They promoted the release on a tour through the Midwest, Florida, and East Coast, which included live performances for Acoustic Café and Mountain Stage. Both were syndicated on 140 and 200 radio stations, respectively. By April 25, the duo had over 115,000 Spotify followers and their song "Cadence" from Dark Nights Golden Days had been streamed more than 330,000 times. "These Cold Nights" had been streamed almost five million times. In October 2022, the duo released a forty-eight-minute visual album to accompany Dark Nights Golden Days and promoted it with a series of film showings. The film focuses on the members' lives as musicians and brothers and features Maine's natural landscape and digital 3D environments. In January 2023, they performed at the Ann Arbor Folk Fest in Michigan alongside Ani DiFranco, Patty Griffin, Gina Chavez, and St. Paul and The Broken Bones. The following month they were recruited to perform alongside Jeff Tweedy, Andrew Bird, Trampled by Turtles, Nitty Gritty Dirt Band, Patty Griffin, Neko Case, and Shovels & Rope on the 15th Cayamo cruise. Later that year they released Origami, a digital album of remixed versions of previously released songs. In June 2024, they were booked to headline the Resurgam Festival in Portland, Maine. In August 2025, they played the inaugural Back Cove Music and Arts Festival in the same city. Their five-song EP Can You Feel the Sun Returning was released in April of that year.

== Origins ==
Born three years apart, Sean and Jamie Oshima are brothers of Japanese-Italian ancestry who grew up in the rural community of Whitefield, Maine. Their American folk musician parents made thirty different instruments available to them in the home as children and brought them to gigs at weddings, farmers markets, and contra dances. They started singing together in the bathtub when Jamie was three years old and Sean was six. Jamie started playing drums at four, learning by playing along to Beatles songs. He started learning guitar at five. By ten he was using a looping machine from his father. The brothers learned to sing harmonies with their mother while driving to school as young children and also sang Beatles songs with both parents at the dinner table. Jamie's first concert as a solo performer was for a crowd of about two hundred at a church in Midcoast Maine, at which he played a fingerstyle guitar piece by Tommy Emmanuel. Sean began writing songs at thirteen. The pair attended Camden High School, but Jamie homeschooled the final two years of high school to accommodate his career as a touring musician.

== Musical style ==
Oshima Brothers' genre has been described as "folk-pop", "folk-adjacent", "contemporary folk and acoustic pop", "neo-folk", "indie pop", "alt-pop", "roots-based pop", and "Americana". The musicians themselves consider their genre to be fluid and open to interpretation by the listener. The brothers claim that Maine's rural landscape is a major influence on their work. Musical influences include albums by the Beatles and Gillian Welch they heard at home growing up, plus music by Ed Sheeran, Lake Street Dive, and Thirdstory they discovered later on. Over the course of the COVID-19 pandemic, they started incorporating dance-pop sounds into their work. Some tracks on their 2022 album are described this way. According to Atwood Magazine's Mitch Mosk: "Best known as weavers of charismatic folk pop, Oshima Brothers seem to have broken out of any and all genre constraints on [Dark Nights Golden Days]; their songs incorporate a wealth of influences, including folk, pop, alternative, R&B, funk, rock, and so on." Grateful Dead manager Richard Loren described the brothers as "unbelievably accomplished songwriters, singers and instrumentalists".

== Musicianship ==
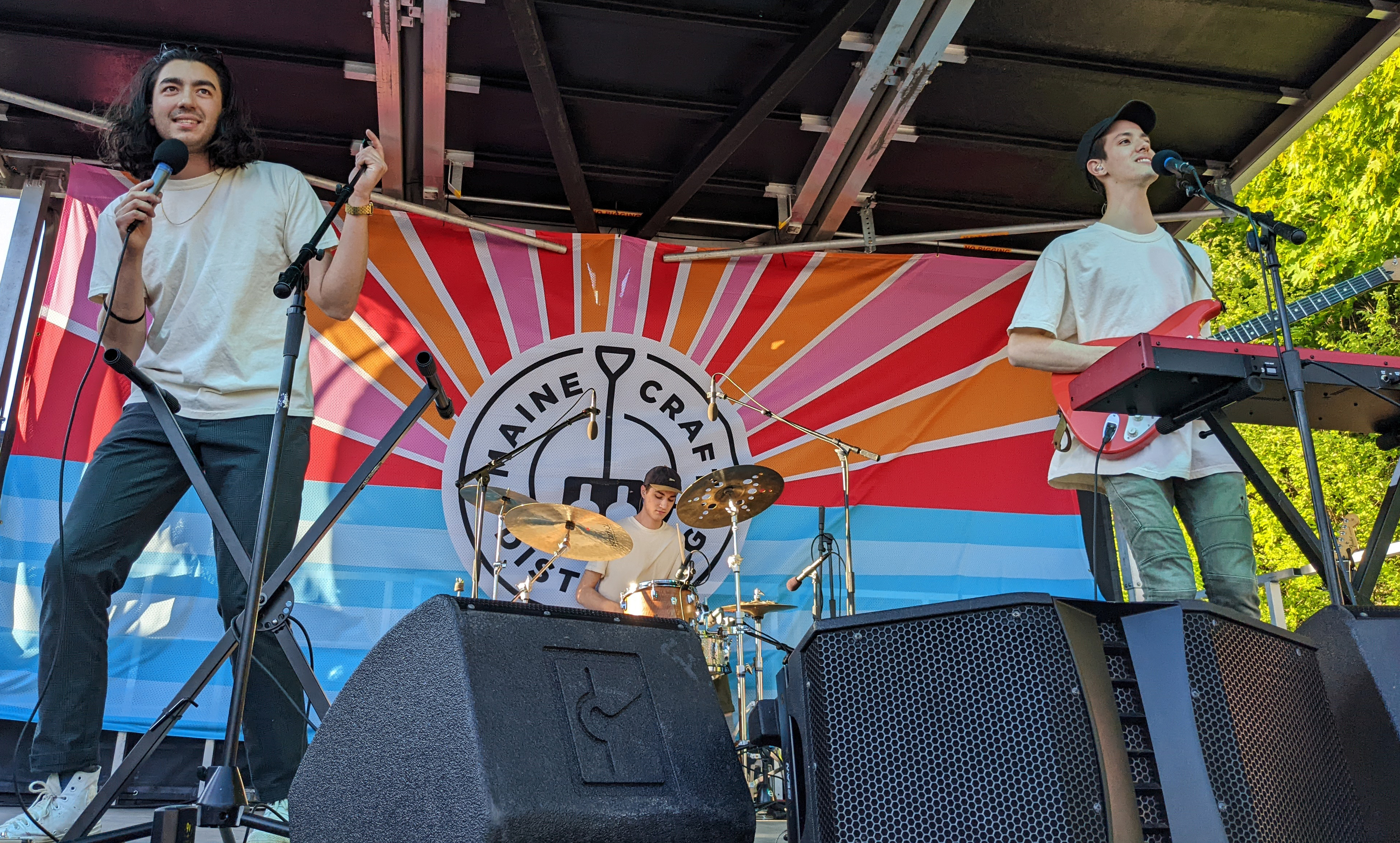
At Maine Craft Distilling in Portland, Maine, May 2022

Both Sean and Jamie are self-taught musicians and have received no formal training. On stage, Sean primarily sings lead vocals and plays acoustic guitar, but also plays piano. Jamie sings harmonies and plays electric guitar, Rhodes piano, Wurlitzer piano, bass guitar, fiddle, synthesizer, organ, mandolin, banjo, kalimba, foot percussion board, kick drum, snare drum, penny whistle, and flute. Jamie often operates multiple instruments at once, playing one with his hands and a percussion instrument with his feet, then sampling and looping himself and Sean to create a complex soundscape as if there were more than two members. According to Sean: "It culminates in what we hope is the sound of at least three people".

The brothers share band responsibilities based on their own natural proclivities. The more gregarious of the two, Sean handles external communications and is the primary songwriter. More comfortable at home, Jamie specializes in recording, mixing, and set building. In 2024, Jamie was described by traditional folk music duo Rakish as "a great producer and probably a genius".

Songwriting responsibilities are shared between the brothers. Their songs often start with an initial concept from Sean that gets more fully developed with input from Jamie. Jamie also drew the illustrations for the crankie they operate while playing "Love is Tall" from Dark Nights Golden Days.

Jamie leads production of their music videos. According to Sean: "All the videos come from Jamie's own brain and vision". Almost every song is paired with a music video, which they choreograph, direct, record, and edit on their own. As of October 2022, these videos have attracted over a quarter million views on YouTube. Like his musicianship, Jamie's video production skills are self-taught. He published his first music video to YouTube when he was eleven.

== Personal life ==
Having grown up in Whitefield, Maine, the brothers later relocated to the coastal community of Belfast. By 2021 they had moved to the state's largest city of Portland, which Rolling Stone magazine had recently described as being home to one of the country's eight best music scenes. Sean loves cooking for others and woodworking in his free time.

== Discography ==
Albums

- Oshima Brothers (2016)
- Dark Nights Golden Days (2022)
- Dark Nights Golden Days visual album (2022)
- Origami (2023)
- In Orbit (2026)

EPs

- Under the Same Stars (2019)
- Sunset Red (2020)
- Lost at Sea (Origami Edit) (2023)
- Can You Feel the Sun Returning (2025)
