= Saddle Tramp (film) =

1950 film by Hugo Fregonese

- Film poster
- Directed by: Hugo Fregonese
- Written by: Harold Shumate
- Produced by: Leonard Goldstein
- Starring: Joel McCrea; Wanda Hendrix
- Cinematography: Charles P. Boyle
- Edited by: Frank Gross
- Color process: Technicolor
- Production company: Universal Pictures
- Distributed by: Universal Pictures
- Release dates: July 10, 1950 (Los Angeles-Premiere); September 21, 1950 (United States)
- Running time: 76 minutes
- Country: United States
- Language: English

Saddle Tramp is a 1950 American Western film directed by Hugo Fregonese and starring Joel McCrea and Wanda Hendrix. Its uncredited theme song was "The Cry of the Wild Goose" by Frankie Laine.

== Plot ==
While travelling through Nevada en route to California, "saddle tramp" Chuck Conner stays overnight with an old close friend. After the friend is killed falling from his horse, "Uncle Chuck" feels a duty to look after his four young boys, whose mother had died previously. He takes a job on a local ranch, but must conceal his new family from his employer. He also takes in a young woman who has run away from home, and she assists him to tackle a gang of cattle rustlers.

== Cast ==
- Joel McCrea as Chuck Conner
- Wanda Hendrix as Della
- John Russell as Rocky
- John McIntire as Jess Higgins
- Jeanette Nolan as Ma Higgins
- Russell Simpson as Pop
- Ed Begley as Mr. August Hartnagle
- Jimmy Hunt as Robbie
- Orley Lindgren as Tommie
- Gordon Gebert as Johnnie
- Gregory Moffett as Butch
- Antonio Moreno as Martinez
- John Ridgely as Slim
- Walter Coy as Mr Phillips
- Joaquin Garay as Pancho
- Peter Leeds as Springer
- Michael Steele as Orvie
- Paul Picerni as Denver

== Bibliography ==
- Nott, Robert. Last of the Cowboy Heroes: The Westerns of Randolph Scott, Joel McCrea, and Audie Murphy. McFarland, 2005. ISBN 978-0-7864-2261-6
