= Waikiki (1980 film) =

1980 television film directed by Ron Satlof

- DVD cover
- Genre: Action; Crime; Drama
- Written by: Don Balluck; Ron Friedman; Robert Janes; Curtis Kenyon
- Directed by: Ron Satlof
- Starring: Dack Rambo; Donna Mills; Steve Marachuk; Tanya Roberts; Cal Bellini; Darren McGavin
- Music by: Stu Phillips
- Country of origin: United States
- Original language: English

Production
- Executive producers: Douglas S. Cramer; Aaron Spelling
- Producer: Robert Janes
- Production locations: Kailua, O'ahu
- Cinematography: Robert L. Morrison
- Editors: Joe Morrisey; John Shreyer
- Running time: 96 minutes
- Production company: Aaron Spelling Productions

Original release
- Network: ABC
- Release: April 21, 1980

Waikiki (also known as Waikiki Mission) is a 1980 American action crime drama television film that originally aired on ABC. Directed by Ron Satlof, it stars Dack Rambo, Steve Marachuk, Donna Mills, Tanya Roberts, Cal Bellini, and Darren McGavin and follows a pair of private detectives called on to investigate the bizarre serial murders of young women in Waikiki. The film combines elements of a crime thriller with the atmosphere of an exotic resort in the 1980s. Despite the serious nature of the plot, the film maintains a light and dynamic atmosphere thanks to the colorful characters and local landscapes.

== Plot ==
The film is set in Waikiki, Hawaii. The main characters are two private detectives, one a laid-back Californian and the other a streetwise New Yorker. They team up to investigate a series of mysterious murders of young women occurring in the Waikiki area. The murders cause alarm in the community, and the detectives dive into the investigation, which includes visiting nightclubs, interacting with locals, and immersing themselves in the Hawaiian culture.

As the story progresses, the detectives encounter danger, intrigue, and unexpected discoveries, getting closer to solving the mystery of the ruthless serial killer known as "The Cane Field Murderer."

== Cast ==
- Dack Rambo as Ronnie Browning
- Donna Mills as Cassie Howard
- Steve Marachuk as David King
- Tanya Roberts as Carol
- Cal Bellini as Rex
- Darren McGavin as Captain Mcguire
- Robert F. Lyons as Mark Barrington
- Mark Slade as Lloyd Barrington
- Branscombe Richmond as Walter Kaamanu
- Betty Carvalho as Annie Kaamanu
- Jenny Sherman as Amy
- Angus Duncan as Joe Farnsworth
- Karen Austin as Joanie
- Anne-Marie Martin as Penny
- Robert Apisa as Kahea
- Jack Hisatake as Kona
- Tommy Fujiwara as Coroner
- Suzanne Schulman as Lori
- Sigrid S. Sundstrom as Terri
- Paul Verdier as French tourist
- Laura Allen as Party guest
- Mark Pinkosh as Surfer boy

== Reception ==
The Los Angeles Times called the film "fast and absorbing escapist fare."
