= Jeanette Nolan =

American actress (1911–1998)

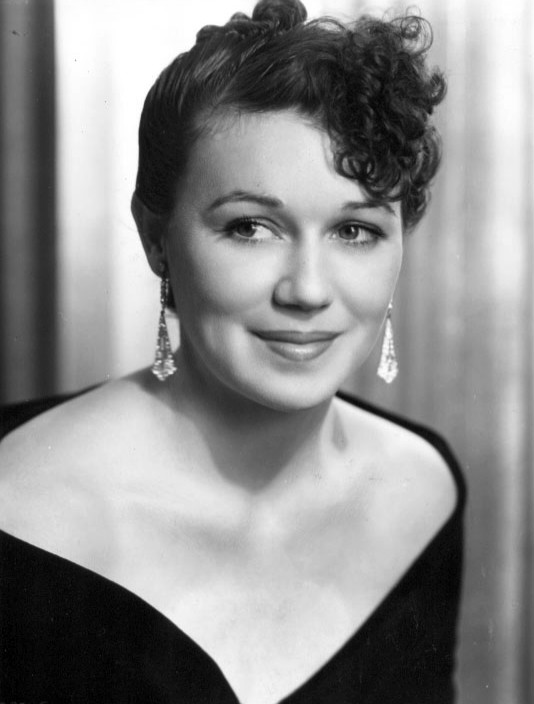
- Nolan in 1935
- Born: December 30, 1911; Los Angeles, California, U.S.
- Died: June 5, 1998 (aged 86); Los Angeles, California, U.S.
- Occupation: Actress
- Years active: 1932–1998
- Television: The Virginian (1962–1971); Dirty Sally (1974)
- Spouse: John McIntire (m. 1935; died 1991)
- Children: Holly Wright, Tim McIntire

Jeanette Nolan (December 30, 1911 – June 5, 1998) was an American actress. Nominated for four Emmy Awards, she had roles in the television series The Virginian (1962–1971) and Dirty Sally (1974) and in films such as Macbeth (1948).

Nolan was long married to prolific character actor John McIntire, with whom she occasionally worked.

== Career ==
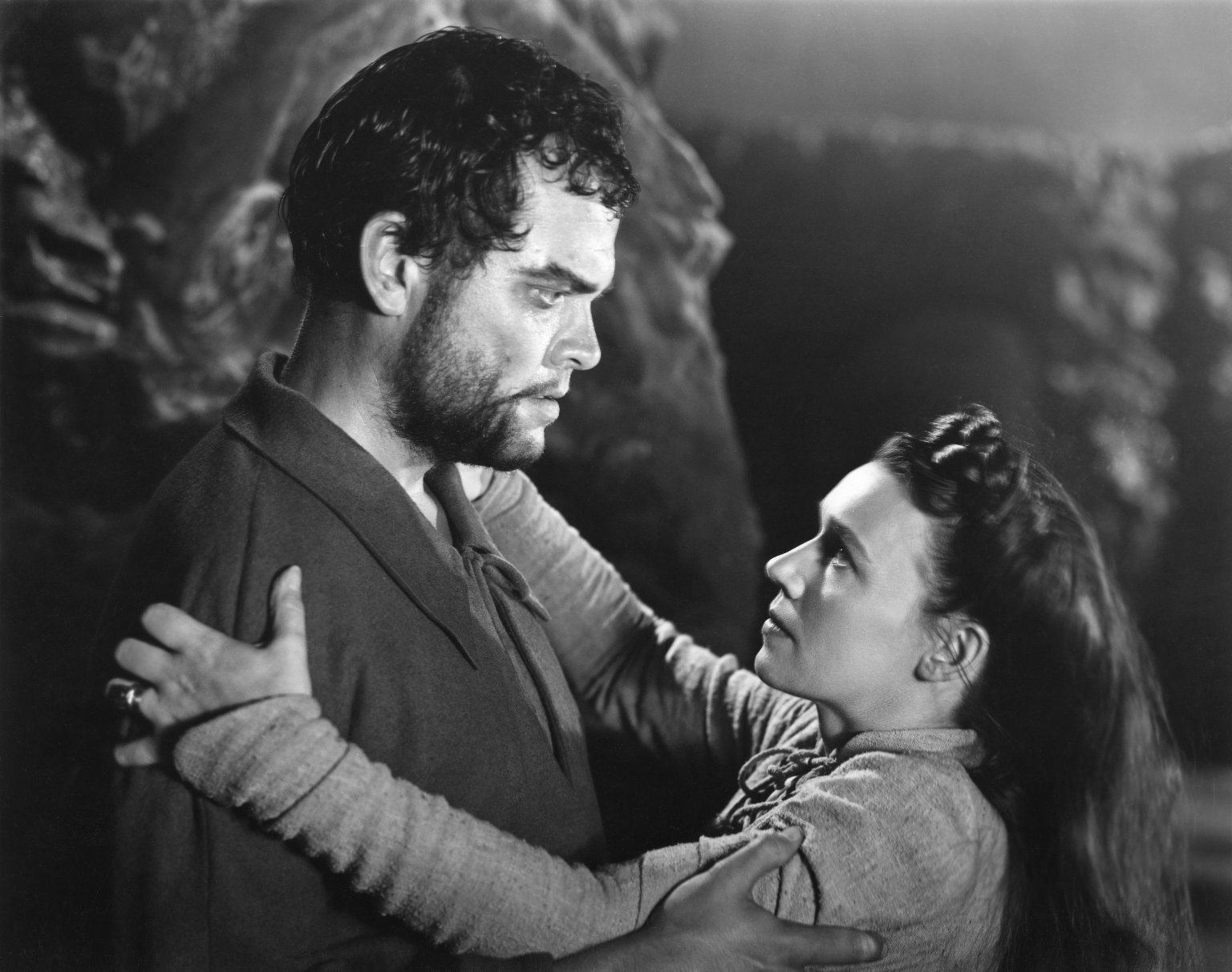
Orson Welles and Nolan in Macbeth (1948)

Nolan began her prolific acting career at the Pasadena Playhouse and, while a student at Los Angeles City College, made her radio debut in 1932 in Omar Khayyam, the first transcontinental broadcast from station KHJ. She continued acting into the 1990s.

She appeared regularly in several radio series, including Young Doctor Malone, 1939–1940; Cavalcade of America, 1940–1941; Nicolette Moore in One Man's Family, 1947–1950; and The Great Gildersleeve, 1949–1952. She appeared episodically in many more.

She made her film debut as Lady Macbeth in Orson Welles' 1948 film Macbeth, based on Shakespeare's play of the same name. Despite the fact that she and the film received withering reviews at the time, Nolan's film career flourished in largely supporting roles. Viewers of film noir may know her best as the corrupt wife of a dead (and equally corrupt) police officer in Fritz Lang's The Big Heat.

Nolan made more than three hundred television appearances, including the religion anthology series Crossroads and as Dr. Marion in the 1956 episode "The Healer" in Brian Keith's CBS Cold War series, Crusader. She appeared on Rod Cameron's syndicated series State Trooper.

In 1957, she played "Ma Grilk" in season 3 episode 5, "Potato Road", of the TV Western Gunsmoke. Nolan was cast as Emmy Zecker in the 1959 episode "Johnny Yuma" of the ABC western series The Rebel, starring Nick Adams. She appeared in two episodes of David Janssen's crime drama Richard Diamond, Private Detective. She starred as Maggie Bowers in the Peter Gunn episode "Love Me to Death" in 1959. She played Sadie Grimes in Alfred Hitchcock Presents episode titled "The Right Kind of House," which first aired March 9, 1958, and Mrs. Edith in "Coming Home" June 13, 1961.

From 1959 to 1960, she played Annette Deveraux, part-owner of the hotel in the CBS western series Hotel de Paree, with Earl Holliman. In 1960, she appeared in season 4, episode 7 of Richard Boone's Have Gun – Will Travel as a newly widowed sheriff. Also, in 1962, season 5, episode 24, as the lost mother of an Eastern schoolgirl. She appeared in two other episodes. She was cast in other western films, including The Wild Women of Chastity Gulch (1982).

Nolan made six guest appearances on CBS's Perry Mason, including the role of the murderer Mrs. Kirby in the 1958 episode "The Case of the Fugitive Nurse," Emma Benson in the 1960 episode "The Case of the Nine Dolls," Mama Norden in "The Case of the Hateful Hero," Martha Blair in the 1962 episode "The Case of the Counterfeit Crank," the title character of Nellie in the 1964 episode "The Case of the Betrayed Bride," and defendant Emma Ritter in the 1965 episode "The Case of the Fugitive Fraulein."

She guest starred as "Sister Mary Paul", a nun fooled into hiding an injured killer, in the 1961 S3Ep24 episode "The Good & The Bad" in CBS's Bat Masterson.

She then portrayed Janet Picard in the episode "Woman in the River" of the ABC/Warner Brothers detective series Bourbon Street Beat, starring Andrew Duggan. She gave an over-the-top performance as a crazed old woman in the "Parasite Mansion" episode of NBC's Thriller.

On April 27, 1962, she appeared in the episode "A Book of Faces" on another ABC crime drama, Target: The Corruptors!, starring Stephen McNally and Robert Harland. She guest starred as Claire Farnham in the episode "To Love Is to Live" on the psychiatric medical drama The Eleventh Hour. She was cast as a fortune teller, Mme. Di Angelo, in the 1963 episode "The Black-Robed Ghost" of the anthology series GE True, hosted by Jack Webb.

She was a member of the repertory cast of The Richard Boone Show, appearing in 25 episodes.

In 1963, Nolan was cast as Mrs. Mertens in the episode "Reformation of Willie" of the ABC drama series, Going My Way, starring Gene Kelly as a Roman Catholic priest in New York City. Nolan appeared three times on Wagon Train, in which her husband, John McIntire, co-starred as wagon master Chris Hale from 1961 to 1965.

In 1963, Nolan guest starred as Sister Therese in the episode "Infant of Prague" on ABC's World War II series Combat!.

Nolan guest-starred three times from 1963 to 1964 on Dr. Kildare, and in a 1964 episode of Richard Crenna's short-lived Slattery's People, a political drama series on CBS. Earlier, she had appeared with Crenna and Walter Brennan in their sitcom, The Real McCoys.

Nolan played the role of witches in two of Rod Serling's anthology television series: The Twilight Zone, in the episode "Jess-Belle" with Anne Francis; and the Night Gallery segment "Since Aunt Ada Came to Stay" opposite James Farentino and Michele Lee. Nolan also appeared in the 1962 Twilight Zone episode "The Hunt", with Arthur Hunnicutt.

In 1964, she guest starred on Gunsmoke, playing the title character "Aunt Thede" (S10E13).

On November 4, 1965, Nolan portrayed the treacherous Ma Burns in "The Golden Trail" episode of NBC's Laredo. Ma Burns is a supposedly refined woman trying to hijack a presumed gold shipment headed to Laredo from St. Louis. In actuality, the cargo consists of thirty-six bottles of Tennessee whisky. She was also cast on Laredo as Martha Tuforth in "It's the End of the Road, Stanley" (1966) and as Vita Rose in "Like One of the Family" (1967). Laredo was a two-season spinoff of The Virginian, whose cast Nolan joined in 1967 as Holly Grainger, along with her husband John McIntire who headed the cast as ranch owner Clay Grainger.

In 1968, Nolan was cast in the episode "All in a Day's Work" on the NBC police drama Ironside, playing a mother who has lost her only child who was shot after a robbery. That same year, she appeared on Hawaii Five-O in the role of Aunt Martha.

Nolan guest-starred on the short-lived sitcom The Mothers-in-Law in two separate episodes in the second and final season of the series. She first played Kaye Ballard's grandmother Gabriela Balotta, who always fainted when she didn't get her way; and then secondly as Annie MacTaggart, a Scottish nanny hired to take care of newborn twins of the younger couple, Jerry and Suzie Buell.

In 1974, she starred briefly with Dack Rambo in CBS's Dirty Sally, a spinoff of Gunsmoke, on which she had played a recurring guest role for three episodes. She also played the titular role in the award-winning short film Peege (1972) because of her Gunsmoke connection. Nolan appeared as a guest star in television's Gunsmoke more than any other female.

Nolan portrayed Mrs. Peck in the 1973 episode "Double Shock" of Peter Falk's Columbo series. She was also in a second Columbo episode, as Kate O'Connell in "The Conspirators" (1978).

She and her husband John McIntire played Gloria and George Hancock in S2 E11 "The Love Boat" story "Folks From Home" 1978. This was one of many guest appearances that they made as a married couple on various programs, starting in 1960 (please see McIntire's Wikipedia biography for more examples). In 1985, she played Alma Lindstrom, Rose Nylund's adoptive mother, in the ninth episode of the first season of the hit NBC sitcom The Golden Girls.

Her final film appearance was in Robert Redford's The Horse Whisperer of 1998 as Tom Booker's mother, Ellen.

== Personal life and death ==
Nolan was born in Los Angeles and graduated from Abraham Lincoln High School.

In 1935, Nolan married actor John McIntire; the couple remained married until his death in 1991. Nolan and McIntire had two children together: Holly, a photographer, and Tim, an actor.

Nolan and McIntire worked together several times from the late 1960s on, sometimes as voice actors. They appeared in a 1969 KCET television reading of Norman Corwin's 1938 radio play The Plot to Overthrow Christmas, with McIntire as the Devil and Nolan as Lucrezia Borgia.

In 1977, they appeared in Disney's twenty-third animated film The Rescuers, in which McIntire voiced the cat Rufus and Nolan the muskrat Ellie Mae. Four years later, the couple worked on the 24th Disney film, The Fox and the Hound, with McIntire as the voice of Mr. Digger, an ill-tempered badger, and Nolan as the voice of Widow Tweed, the old kindly widow who takes in Tod after his mother was killed by an off-screen hunter.

They guest-starred on screen together, often portraying a married couple, as in an episode of The Love Boat in 1978, Charlie's Angels in 1979, The Incredible Hulk in 1980, Goliath Awaits in 1981, Quincy, M.E. in 1983, and Night Court in 1985, playing Dan Fielding's hick Louisianan parents.

Nolan died of a stroke in Cedars-Sinai Medical Center on June 5, 1998. She was buried in Eureka, Montana's Tobacco Valley Cemetery.

== Selected filmography ==
- Macbeth (1948) – Lady Macbeth
- Words and Music (1948) – Mrs. Hart
- Abandoned (1949) – Major Ellen Ross
- No Sad Songs for Me (1950) – Mona Frene
- Saddle Tramp (1950) – Ma Higgins
- Kim (1950) – Foster Mother (uncredited)
- The Secret of Convict Lake (1951) – Harriet Purcell
- The Happy Time (1952) – Felice Bonnard
- Hangman's Knot (1952) – Mrs. Margaret Harris
- The Big Heat (1953) – Bertha Duncan
- A Lawless Street (1955) – Mrs. Dingo Brion
- Tribute to a Bad Man (1956) – Mrs. L.A. Peterson
- Everything but the Truth (1956) – Miss Adelaide Dabney
- 7th Cavalry (1956) – Charlotte Reynolds
- The Halliday Brand (1957) – Nante
- The Guns of Fort Petticoat (1957) – Cora Melavan
- April Love (1957) – Henrietta Bruce
- Alfred Hitchcock Presents (1957–1961) (4 episodes)
  - (Season 3 Episode 9: "The Young One") (1957) – Aunt Mae
  - (Season 3 Episode 23: "The Right Kind of House") (1958) – Sadie Grimes
  - (Season 4 Episode 14: "The Morning After") (1959) – Mrs. Trotter
  - (Season 6 Episode 35: "Coming Home") (1961) – Edith Beggs
- Gunsmoke (1957–1972) (8 episodes)
  - (Season 3 Episode 5: "Potato Road") (1957) – Ma Grilk
  - (Season 3 Episode 31: "Amy's Good Deed") (1958) – Amy
  - (Season 6 Episode 20: "Love Thy Neighbor") (1961) – Rose
  - (Season 10 Episode 13: "Aunt Thede") (1964) – Aunt Thede
  - (Season 16 Episode 23: "Pike: Part 1") (1971) – Sally Fergus
  - (Season 16 Episode 24: "Pike: Part 2") (1971) – Sally Fergus
  - (Season 17 Episode 15: "P.S. Murry Christmas") (1972) – Emma Grundy
  - (Season 17 Episode 19: "One for the Road") (1972) – Sally Fergus
- Mr. Adams and Eve (TV series, 1958) (Season 2 Episode 34: "Command Performance") – Grand Duchess Maria
- The Deep Six (1958) – Mrs. Austen
- Wild Heritage (1958) – Ma (Janet) Bascomb
- Have Gun – Will Travel (1958–1962) (4 episodes)
  - (Season 1 Episode 29: "Gun Shy") (1958) – Ma Warren
  - (Season 4 Episode 7: "The Tender Gun") (1960) – Sheriff Maude J. Smuggly
  - (Season 5 Episode 25: "The Trap") (1962) – Jeri
  - (Season 5 Episode 27: "Alice") (1962) – Alice Ferguson, aka Blue Dollar Alice
- Perry Mason (1958–1965) (6 episodes)
  - (Season 1 Episode 22: "The Case of the Fugitive Nurse") (1958) – Mrs. Kirby
  - (Season 4 Episode 9: "The Case of the Nine Dolls") (1960) – Martha Benson
  - (Season 5 Episode 27: "The Case of the Counterfeit Crank") (1962) – Martha Blair
  - (Season 6 Episode 5: "The Case of the Hateful Hero") (1962) – Erna Norden
  - (Season 8 Episode 5: "The Case of the Betrayed Bride") (1964) – Nellie
  - (Season 9 Episode 12: "The Case of the Fugitive Fraulein") (1965) – Emma Ritter
- The Rabbit Trap (1959) – Mrs. Colt
- The Restless Gun (1959) (Season 2 Episode 25: "The Sweet Sisters") – Abigail Sweet
- Psycho (1960) – Norma Bates (voice, uncredited)
- Wanted: Dead or Alive (1960) (Season 3 Episode 14: "Witch Woman") – La Curandera
- The Great Impostor (1961) – Ma Demara
- Two Rode Together (1961) – Mrs. Mary McCandles
- Wagon Train (1961–1965) (3 episodes)
  - (Season 4 Episode 35: "The Janet Hale Story") (1961) – Janet Hale
  - (Season 6 Episode 22: "Charlie Wooster - Outlaw") (1963) – Bella McKavitch
  - (Season 8 Episode 15: "The Chottsie Gubenheimer Story") (1965) – Chottsie Gubenheimer
- The Man Who Shot Liberty Valance (1962) – Nora Ericson
- The Twilight Zone (1962–1963) (2 episodes)
  - (Season 3 Episode 19: "The Hunt") (1962) – Rachel Simpson
  - (Season 4 Episode 7: "Jess-Belle") (1963) – Granny Hart
- Twilight of Honor (1963) – Amy Clinton
- The Richard Boone Show (1963–1964) (25 episodes) – Repertory Cast Member
- The Virginian (1963–1970) (27 episodes) – Holly Grainger / Helen Dwyer
- Combat! (1964) (Season 2 Episode 31: "Infant of Prague") – Sister Therese
- The Alfred Hitchcock Hour (1964) (Season 3 Episode 9: "Triumph") – Mary Fitzgibbons
- My Three Sons (1964–1966) (4 episodes)
  - (Season 5 Episode 4: "Dublin's Fair City: Part 1") (1964) – Aunt Kate
  - (Season 5 Episode 5: "Dublin's Fair City: Part 2") (1964) – Aunt Kate
  - (Season 6 Episode 10: "My Son, the Ballerina") (1965) – Madam Irina
  - (Season 7 Episode 14: "Grandma's Girl") (1966) – Grandma
- My Blood Runs Cold (1965) – Aunt Sarah
- Chamber of Horrors (1966) – Mrs. Ewing Perryman
- The Reluctant Astronaut (1967) – Mrs. Fleming
- Did You Hear the One About the Traveling Saleslady? (1968) – Ma Webb
- Hawaii Five-O (1969) (Season 1 Episode 17: "One for the Money") – Aunt Martha
- Night Gallery (1970–1971) (2 episodes)
  - (Season 1 Episode 1: "The Housekeeper") (1970) – Miss Wattle / Carlotta Acton
  - (Season 2 Episode 3: "Since Aunt Ada Came to Stay") (1971) – Ada Quigley
- Bayou Boy (1971) – Tante Louise
- Peege (1973) – Peege
- Columbo (1973–1978) (2 episodes)
  - (Season 2 Episode 8: "Double Shock") (1973) – Mrs. Peck
  - (Season 7 Episode 5: "The Conspirators") (1978) – Kate O'Connell
- The Streets of San Francisco 1973 (1 episode)
  - (Season 2 Episode 12: "The Runaways") – Judge Millie Cox
- Dirty Sally (1974) – Sally Fergus (14 episodes; 1 unaired)
- The Sky's the Limit (1975) – Gertie
- The Winds of Autumn (1976) – Ora Mae Hankins
- The Rescuers (1977) – Ellie Mae (voice)
- The Manitou (1978) – Mrs. Winconis
- Avalanche (1978) – Florence Shelby
- Charlie's Angels (1979) (with husband John McIntire, Season 3, episode 14, "Angel's on Vacation") as Lydia Danvers
- The Incredible Hulk (1980) (Season 3 Episode 19: "A Rock and a Hard Place") – Lucy Cash
- The Fox and the Hound (1981) – Widow Tweed (voice)
- True Confessions (1981) – Mrs. Spellacy
- Goliath Awaits (1981) – Mrs. Bartholomew
- Cloak and Dagger (1984) – Eunice MacCready
- The Golden Girls (1985) (Season 1 Episode 9: "Blanche and the Younger Man") – Alma Lindstrom
- Night Court (1985) (Season 2 Episode 13) - Mucette Elmore
- Cover Up (1985) (Season 1 Episode 5: "Nothing to Lose") – Virginia
- Street Justice (1987) – Mrs. Chandler
- Cagney & Lacey (1987) (Season 7 Episode 4: "Different Drummer") - Elnora Hendershot
- The Horse Whisperer (1998) – Grandma Ellen Booker (final film role)
