= Holly Wright =

American photographer (1941–2025)

- Born: 13 July 1941; New York City, United States
- Died: 27 November 2025 (aged 84); Charlottesville, Virginia
- Resting place: Charlottesville, Virginia
- Occupations: Photographer, actress
- Spouse: Charles Wright
- Children: 1
- Parent(s): Jeanette Nolan; John McIntire
- Relatives: Tim McIntire (brother)

Holly Wright (née McIntire; July 13, 1941 – November 27, 2025) was an American photographer. After a brief career as a television actress, she gained recognition as a fine art photographer. Her work is included in numerous museum collections, including the Metropolitan Museum of Art and the Yale University Art Gallery. She died in Charlottesville, VA on November 27, 2025, aged 84.

== Early life ==
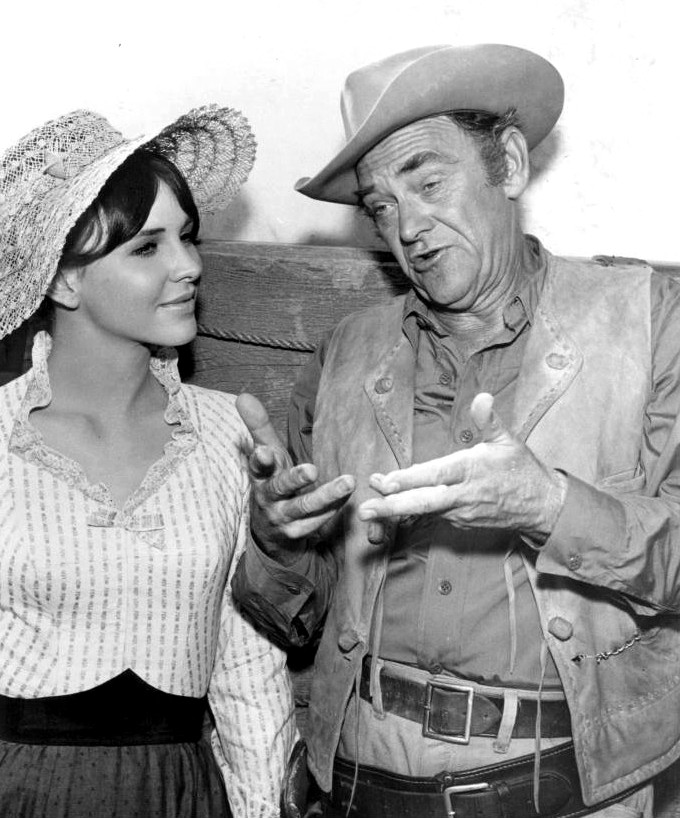
Wright with her father on Wagon Train (1963)

Wright was born in New York City. She is the daughter of actors John McIntire and Jeanette Nolan. Her brother is actor Tim McIntire.

In her early 20s, Wright (credited with her McIntire surname) appeared in two episodes of the television series Wagon Train with her parents. She also appeared in minor roles in the series Gunsmoke, Dr. Kildare and Breaking Point.

Following her brief (1960–1965) acting career, Wright studied English at the University of California Los Angeles, receiving a BA Degree, and then at the University of Iowa where she received an MFA degree in photography. In 1969, she married the poet Charles Wright.

== Photography career ==
For her 1988 solo show at the Corcoran Gallery, Wright exhibited 30 enlarged photos of her hands that appeared to be nude torsos at first glance. The Washington Post called the work "artistically compelling and technically superb."

Wright's work is included in the collections of the Metropolitan Museum of Art, New York, the Fralin Museum of Art at the University of Virginia, the Museum of Fine Arts Houston, the Allen Memorial Art Museum at Oberlin College, the Ringling Museum, the Yale University Art Gallery and the New York Public Library.
