= Saddle tramp =

Person who wanders from place to place on horseback

A saddle tramp is a person who wanders from place to place on horseback, often doing odd jobs, then moving on.

The earliest known use of the term was in the 1922 Fort Wayne (Indiana) Journal-Gazette, according to the Oxford English Dictionary. It was distinct from nomadic cowboy, an itinerant who worked with cattle.

One of the most famous saddle tramps was a woman: Mesannie Wilkins, a 63-year-old farmer who made national headlines in the mid-1950s by traveling thousands of miles from Maine to California by horseback.

In 1936, students at Texas Tech University in Lubbock, Texas, founded the spirit and sports-boosting club Saddle Tramps. Tech student Arch Lamb said he chose the name from stories of traveling men who would come to a farm for a brief time, fix up some things, and move on.

In modern times, "saddle tramp" can refer to a biker. In 2016, Corey Baum from the band Croy and the Boys said, "I doesn’t matter if he’s on a horse or a Honda."

== In popular culture ==
- Saddle Tramp (film) is a 1950 American Western film directed by Hugo Fregonese and starring Joel McCrea and Wanda Hendrix
- Saddle Tramp is a 1966 song by Marty Robbins.
- Saddle Tramp is a 1976 song by Charlie Daniels.

== Saddle tramps in literature ==
- Grochot, Jack (2016). Saga of a Latter-Day SADDLE TRAMP: A Five-Year Odyssey. ISBN 9781537059150.
- Letts, Elizabeth (June 7, 2022). The Ride of Her Life: The True Story of a Woman, Her Horse, and Their Last-Chance Journey Across America. ISBN 978-0525619345.
- Allen, Rick (2016). Tales of a Saddle Tramp. ISBN 9781530131136.
- Preston, Arthur (1929). The Saddle Tramp - A Western Story. ISBN 9781022058460.
- Schweiger, Robert (2013). The Misadventures of an Old Saddle Tramp. ISBN 978-1481704892.
- Wilkins, Mesannie (1967). Sawyer, Mina Titus (collaborator). Last of the Saddle Tramps. Prentice Hall, Inc. Englewood Cliffs, NJ. Foreword by Art Linkletter.

== See also ==
- Sea G. Ryder. November 9, 2013. Lily, The Lovely Bright Molly.
- Confessions of a Saddle Tramp. Shannon King. Boquillas del Carmen, Mexico. April 2023.
