= Dack Rambo =

American actor (1941–1994)

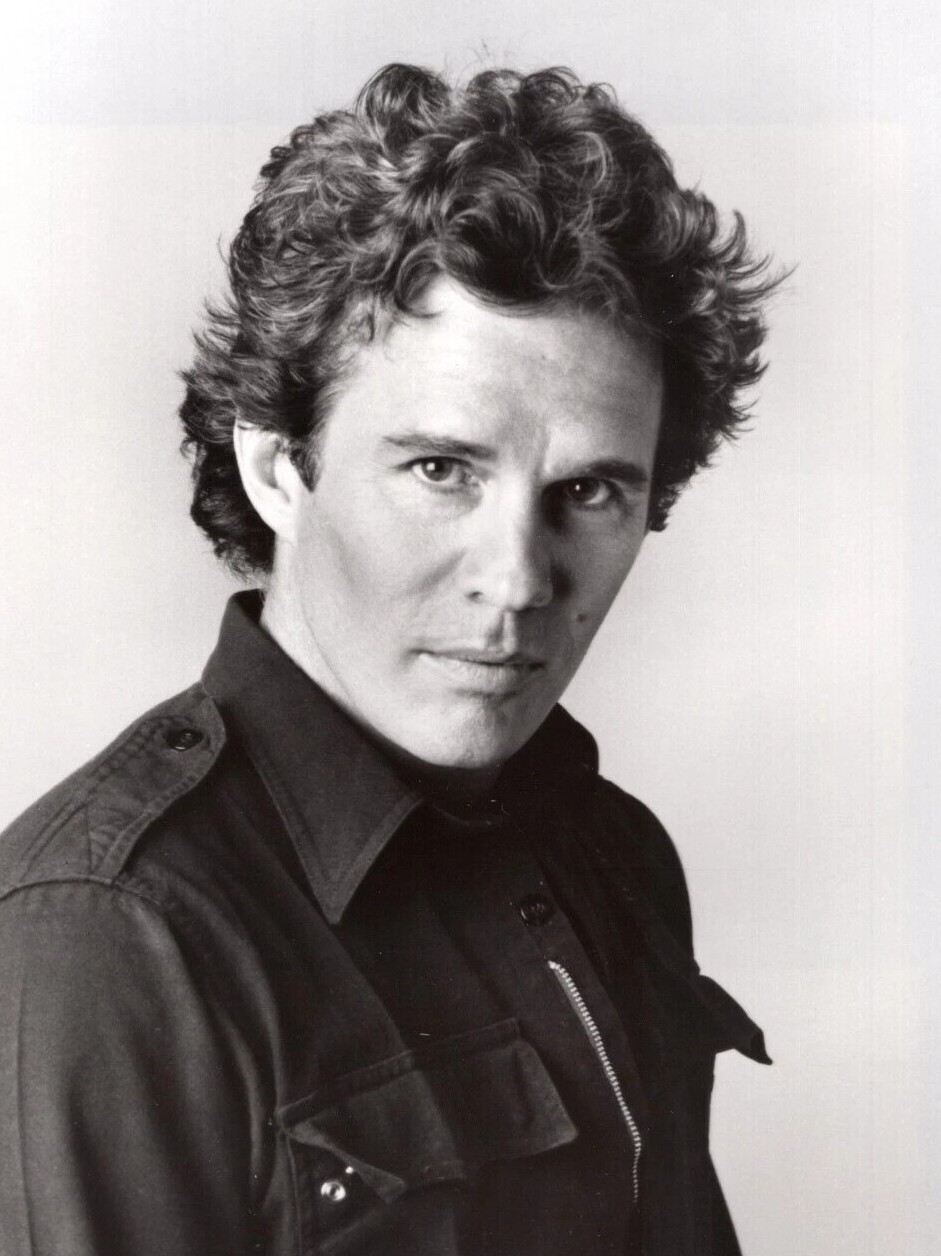
- Rambo in 1984
- Born: Norman Jay Rambo; November 13, 1941; Earlimart, California, U.S.
- Died: March 21, 1994 (aged 52); Delano, California, U.S.
- Other names: Dack Rambeau; Norman "Dack" Rambo; Norman Rambo
- Occupation: Actor
- Years active: 1962–1993

Norman Jay "Dack" Rambo (November 13, 1941 – March 21, 1994) was an American actor, widely known for his role as Walter Brennan's grandson Jeff in the series The Guns of Will Sonnett, as Steve Jacobi in the soap opera All My Children, as cousin Jack Ewing on Dallas, and as Grant Harrison on the soap opera Another World.

== Early life ==
Norman Jay Rambo was born on November 13, 1941, in Earlimart, California, to William Lester and Beatrice A. (née Rossi) Rambo. He was a middle child in a family of four children. His siblings were William Donald Rambo; identical twin Orman Ray "Dirk" Rambo (died 1967), and sister Beverly Jean Rambo. Beatrice Rambo outlived two of her three sons.

== Career ==
After moving to Los Angeles in the 1960s, the 20-year-old twins were discovered by actress Loretta Young in 1962 and cast in her CBS series The New Loretta Young Show. On February 5, 1967, Dirk Rambo was killed in a road accident at the age of 25.

Later that same year, Dack Rambo landed the role of Jeff Sonnett on The Guns of Will Sonnett and co-starred in the short-lived Gunsmoke spin-off Dirty Sally, with Jeanette Nolan. During the 1970s and 1980s, he made guest appearances on Marcus Welby, M.D., House Calls, Wonder Woman, The Rookies, Charlie's Angels, Fantasy Island, The Love Boat, Hotel and Murder, She Wrote. He played Steve Jacobi on All My Children in the early 1980s. He also acted the lead role in Sword of Justice, which lasted for 10 installments in 1978–79. Rambo may be best remembered on television for playing Jack Ewing in 51 episodes of the soap opera Dallas from 1985 to 1987. Rambo also played Wesley Harper on the 1984 short-lived TV series soap opera Paper Dolls.

Rambo promoted a line of men's underwear trademarked in 1987 as "Under Ware by dack rambo" [sic]. While working on Another World, Rambo learned that he was infected with HIV in August 1991. He quit the series shortly thereafter and retired from acting. Rambo then made his HIV infection and his bisexuality public, revealing that he had been in relationships with both men and women since his 20s.

== Personal life ==
For most of his life, Rambo was closeted about his bisexuality. He later said he had been bisexual for most of his life, and had a "spicy" sex life that never included safe sex.

Rambo learned he was HIV-positive on August 30, 1991, while preparing to tape scenes for Another World. After finishing work, he told the producers that he had HIV and that he wished to leave the show. He never returned to acting. Rambo issued a press release on October 1, 1991, publicly disclosing his seroconversion status. His announcement came three weeks after actor Brad Davis died of AIDS and a month before basketball star Magic Johnson announced he had HIV.

Rambo came out as bisexual in an interview with The Washington Post on November 25, 1991.

The actor admitted in November 1991 that he had an addiction to alcohol and prescription drugs for several years. His time on Dallas was not a happy one, and his addiction significantly worsened after he left the show. He entered the Betty Ford Center for treatment in the summer of 1991 and became sober. Rambo denied he had ever been an intravenous drug user.

== Death ==
Dack Rambo died on March 21, 1994, at the age of 52 of complications from AIDS.

== Filmography ==
Year	Title	Role	Notes
1962–1963	The Loretta Young Show	Peter Massey	26 episodes
1965	Never Too Young	Tim	16 episodes
1966	The Virginian	Wesley Hedges	Season 05 Episode 10: "High Stakes"
1967	Iron Horse	Lieutenant Shelby	Episode: "Sister Death"; Credited as Norman Rambo
1967–1969	The Guns of Will Sonnett	Jeff Sonnett	50 episodes
1970	Which Way to the Front?	Terry Love	
1970–1971	Gunsmoke	Cyrus Pike	3 episodes
1971	The Man and the City	Holland Jr.	Episode: "Disaster on Turner Street"
1971	River of Gold	Riley Briggs	ABC Movie of the Week
1971	Cannon	Bryan Gibson	Episode: "Stone, Cold Dead"
1973	Owen Marshall, Counselor at Law	Don	Episode: "Sweet Harvest"
1974	Dirty Sally	Cyrus Pike	13 episodes
1974	Nightmare Honeymoon	David Webb	
1974	Hit Lady	Doug Reynolds	ABC Movie of the Week
1975	Marcus Welby, M.D.		Episodes: "Dark Fury" (Parts 1 & 2)
1975	The Rookies	Tommy Locke	Episode: "Angel"
1977	Good Against Evil	Andy Stuart	TV movie
1977	Wonder Woman	Andros	Episodes: " Mind Stealers from Outer Space" (Parts 1 & 2)
1977	Tabitha	Ted	Episode: "Tabitha's Triangle"
1978	A Double Life	Jack Cole	TV movie
1978–1979	Sword of Justice	Jack Cole	10 episodes
1978–1986	Fantasy Island	Captain Timothy Black / Carl Wagner / Mike O'Brien / Captain Rawlins / Prince Peter d'Anatoli	6 episodes
1979–1986	The Love Boat	Boyd Hughes / Alan Marciano / Peter Welch	3 episodes
1980	Waikiki	Ronnie	Television movie
1980	Charlie's Angels	Steve	Episode: "Angel in Hiding"
1981	House Calls		Episode: "All About Adam"
1981	Rich and Famous	Kent	Uncredited
1982–1983	All My Children	Steve Jacobi	7 episodes
1983–1987	Hotel	Various	3 episodes
1984	The Mississippi		Episode: "Wheels of Justice"
1984	No Man's Land	Connell	TV movie
1984	Paper Dolls	Wesley Harper	13 episodes
1984–1990	Murder, She Wrote	Arnold Hastings / Bill Hampton / Brian Shelby	3 episodes
1985–1987	Dallas	Jack Ewing	51 episodes
1987	Shades of Love: Lilac Dream	Matt	Direct-to-video release
1988	Lonely Knights	Brad Moore	TV movie
1988	Hunter	Deputy D.A. Jason Leffler	Episode: "Presumed Guilty"
1989	Highway to Heaven	Larry Nichols	Episode: "The Source"
1990	The Spring	Andy	
1990	Ultra Warrior	Kenner	Alternative title: Welcome to Oblivion
1990	River of Diamonds	John Tregard	
1990–1991	Another World	Grant Harrison	Contract role, final appearance
