= John McIntire =

American actor (1907–1991)

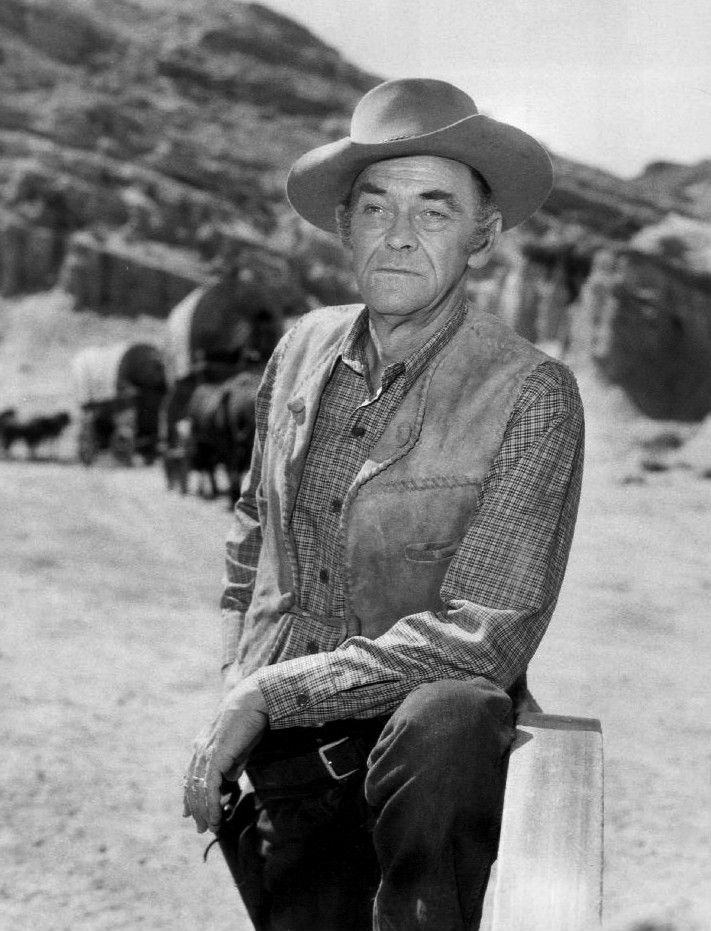
- McIntire as Chris Hale in Wagon Train (1961)
- Born: June 27, 1907; Spokane, Washington, U.S.
- Died: January 30, 1991 (aged 83); Pasadena, California, U.S.
- Resting place: Tobacco Valley Cemetery, Eureka, Montana, U.S.
- Education: University of Southern California
- Occupation: Actor
- Years active: 1932–1989
- Spouse: Jeanette Nolan (m. 1935)
- Children: Holly Wright; Tim McIntire

John Herrick McIntire (June 27, 1907 – January 30, 1991) was an American character actor who appeared in 65 theatrical films and many television series. McIntire is well known for having replaced Ward Bond, upon Bond's sudden death in November 1960, as the star of NBC's Wagon Train. He played Christopher Hale, the leader of the wagon train (and successor to Bond's character, Seth Adams) from early 1961 to the end of the series in 1965. He also replaced Charles Bickford, upon Bickford's death in 1967, as ranch owner Clay Grainger (brother of Bickford's character) on NBC's The Virginian for four seasons.

== Early years ==
John McIntire was born in Spokane, Washington, the son of Byron Jean McIntire and Chastine Uretta Herrick McIntire. He was of Irish descent. He grew up primarily in Eureka, Montana, around ranchers, an experience that later inspired his performances in dozens of film and television westerns. Later, he lived in Santa Monica, California.

McIntire studied at the University of California for two years before dropping out.

== Career ==
McIntire began acting on radio in Tarzan and the Diamond of Asher and he met his future wife Jeanette Nolan through their work on radio programs. McIntire played the title role in a Los Angeles radio station's production of The Adventures of Bill Lance and was the first actor to play the title role in the CBS radio drama Crime Doctor. He played Jack Packard in I Love a Mystery and Peter Carter in the radio version of The Lineup. He worked on many episodes of Suspense from the early 1940s. He was the narrator for the radio programs Lincoln Highway and The March of Time. He can be heard on an episode of the radio version of Gunsmoke on CBS portraying Miss Kitty's estranged father.

He was active in the theatre, before he embarked on a lengthy film and television career as a character actor. He was already 40 when he made his big-screen debut in 1947 in the movie The Hucksters, but went on to appear in films, often portraying police figures, doctors, judges, eccentric loners or other western characters.

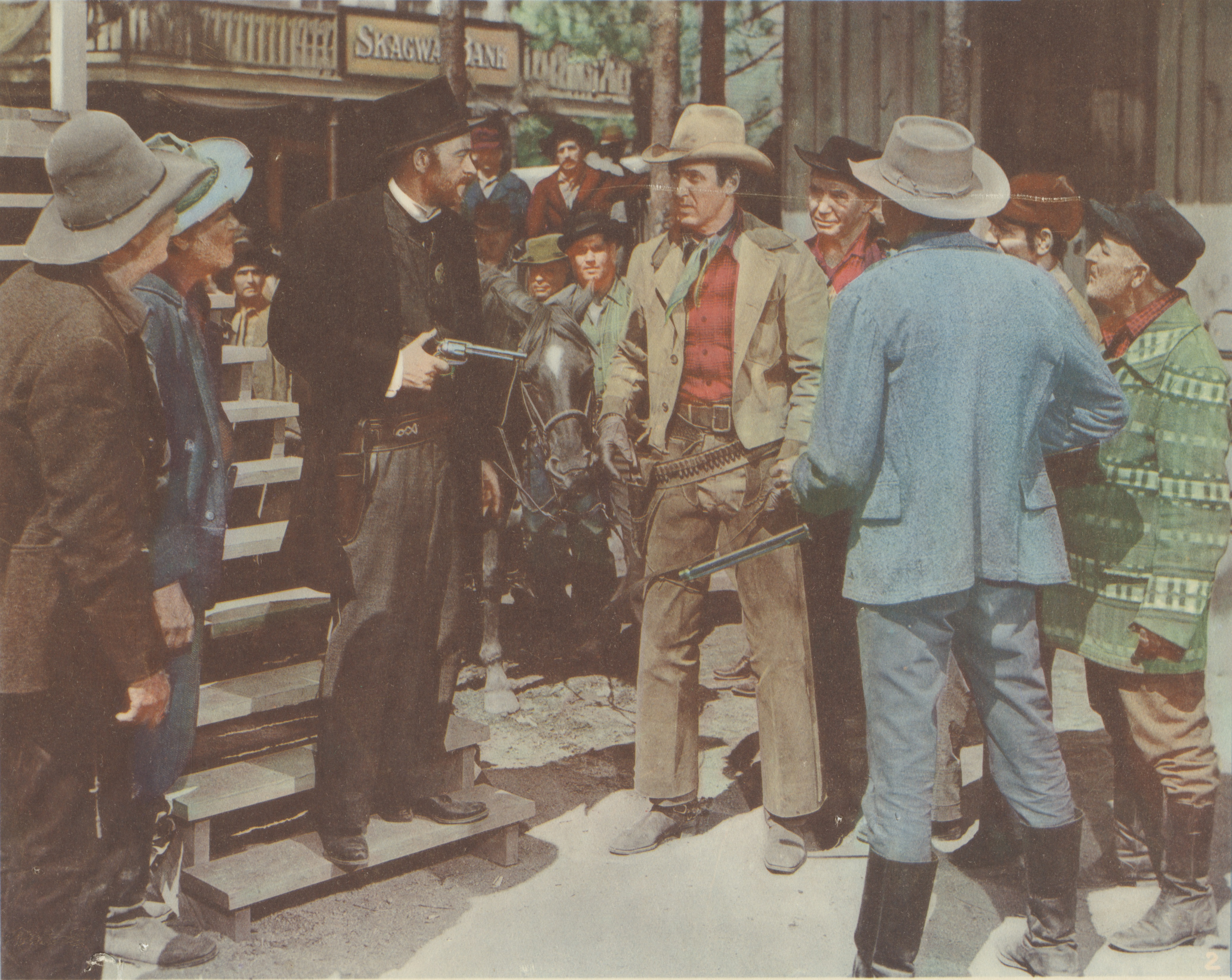
McIntire and James Stewart in The Far Country (1955)

Some of his most remembered roles were in Westerns, such as The Far Country (1955), with James Stewart, and The Tin Star (1957) with Henry Fonda. In Ambush (1950) he displayed horsemanship skills playing a Cavalry scout, alongside Robert Taylor. The same year he played a card sharp and gun dealer in Anthony Mann's Winchester '73. He also had a turn as an aging detective in Scene of the Crime (1949), and played a police commissioner in The Asphalt Jungle (1950). In 1960, he appeared as a sheriff in the 1960 Hitchcock thriller Psycho, and the drama Elmer Gantry starring Burt Lancaster.

Though he technically played a supporting part, McIntire received top billing for his portrayal of real-life reform politician Albert Patterson, who was assassinated by local gangsters in the fact-based crime movie The Phenix City Story (1955).

In the mid-1950s, McIntire moved into television, appearing in anthology series, sitcoms and dramas. He guest-starred as Judson in the episode "Chinese Invasion" of NBC's one-season Western series, Cimarron City, with George Montgomery and John Smith.

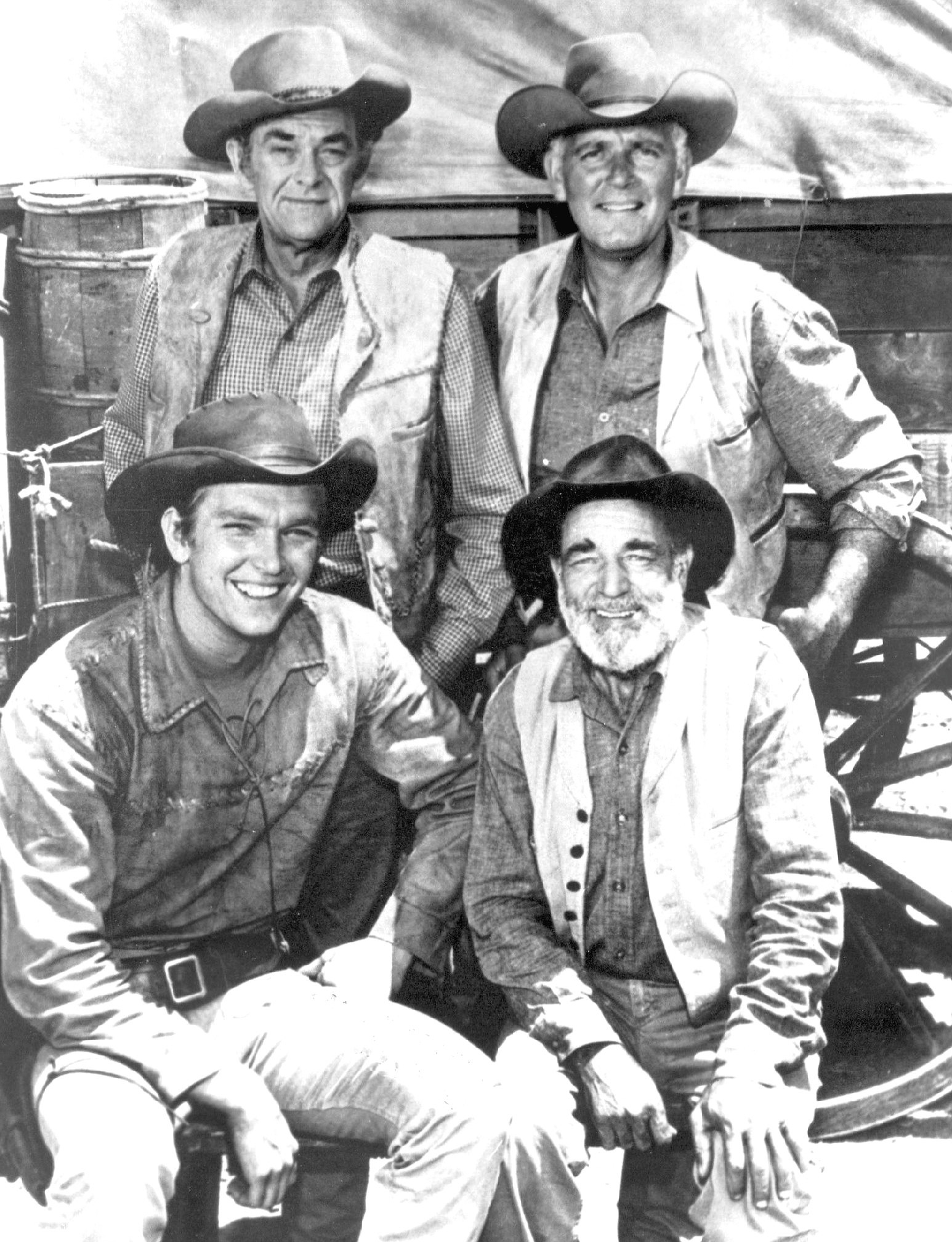
1962 Wagon Train cast with (clockwise) McIntire, Terry Wilson, Frank McGrath, and Scott Miller.

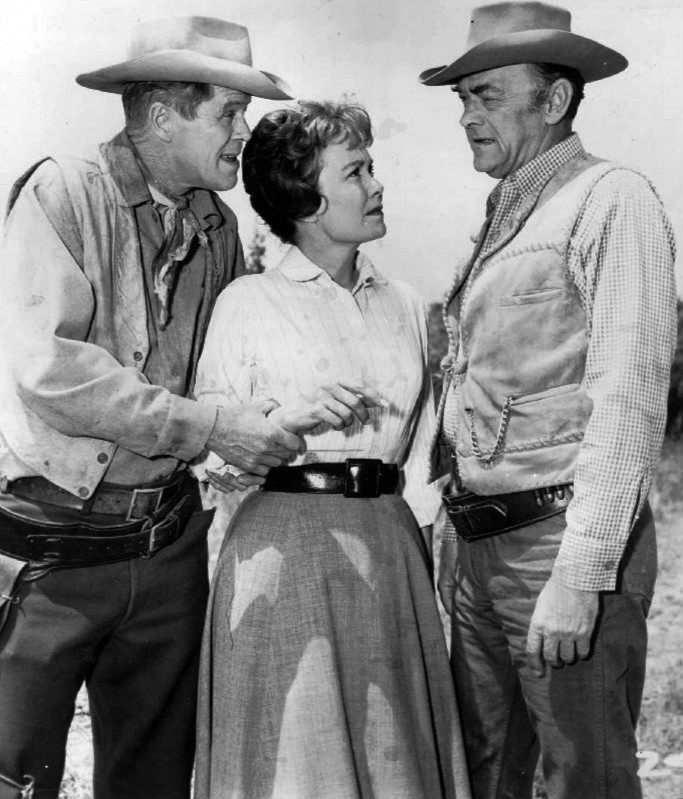
With Wagon Train guest stars Dan Duryea and Jane Wyman, 1962

McIntire procured a regular role on ABC's Naked City, before his character was killed off (in the episode, "The Bumper," done at his own suggestion, as he found the New York–based filming was not to his liking, with him living on the west coast then and asked to be released from the show). McIntire was cast from January to May 1961 in the supporting role of Pa Canfield in the NBC American Civil War drama The Americans.

He was a guest star playing a dogged investigative radio newsman "Lauren Hall" (a figure not unlike show narrator Walter Winchell) in The Untouchables episode; "A Seat On The Fence."

Though McIntire had never played the lead in a theatrical film, television provided him with his most prominent and long-running role when, in 1961, he replaced the late Ward Bond in the NBC/ABC series Wagon Train, playing trail master Chris Hale in more than 150 episodes from 1961 to 1965. His co-stars were Robert Horton, Robert Fuller, Denny Scott Miller, Terry Wilson, Frank McGrath, and Michael Burns. Previous to this, in 1959, he had played the title character in the Wagon Train episode, "The Andrew Hale Story," in which he co-starred with Ward Bond.

In 1960, McIntire guest-starred as William Palmer in the series finale, "The Most Dangerous Gentleman," of the short-lived NBC western Overland Trail, starring William Bendix and Doug McClure, his subsequent co-star on The Virginian. Also in 1960, McIntire starred in a The Twilight Zone episode "The Chaser" where he played a mysterious purveyor of potions. McIntire guest-starred twice in the western TV series Bonanza. He played Sheriff Mike Latimer in the 1961 episode "The Bride" and he portrayed Old Charlie Conners in the 1966 episode "Old Charlie" (which also featured his wife Jeanette Nolan and their son Tim playing a young villain whom his character Charlie kills in self defense). In 1967, he guest-starred in an episode of CBS's short-lived western, Dundee and the Culhane.

McIntire replaced actor Charles Bickford (who had himself replaced Lee J. Cobb) on NBC's The Virginian in 1967 when Bickford died (the second time McIntire replaced the leading man in a television series after the lead died, the first being Ward Bond in Wagon Train). McIntire played Clay Grainger, the brother of Bickford's character for four seasons, a major recurring leading role in a weekly 90-minute western series similar in size and scope to his earlier work on Wagon Train.

He played the supporting role of Judge Parker in Rooster Cogburn (1975), the sequel to True Grit starring John Wayne and Katharine Hepburn, and appeared as Owen Keating in the 1977 television miniseries Aspen. His final film role was in Turner & Hooch (1989).

In 1979–1980, McIntire played Ethan McHenry in Shirley on NBC, and in 1981, he played Sam Whittier on the ABC drama The American Dream.

Starting in 1960 McIntire began appearing with his wife Jeanette Nolan. Both were in Psycho, he playing a sheriff and she voicing some of the "mother" lines. In the Wagon Train episode "The Janet Hale Story" McIntire and Nolan played husband and wife Chris and Janet Hale. In The Virginian, they also played husband and wife. They both appeared again as husband and wife in The Fugitive (1966) season 3, episode 24, (titled; 'Ill Wind') as farm workers again appearing with their real life son, Tim.

The couple played Gloria and George Hancock in "The Love Boat" S2 E11 story "Folks From Home" 1978. In the 1979 Charlie's Angels episode "Angels on Vacation" they appeared together as Chris Monroe's Uncle Paul and Aunt Lydia. They played a US senator and his wife in the TV movie Goliath Awaits (1981). In the 1984 comic spy adventure Cloak & Dagger, they again played a couple. This time they portrayed sinister spies posing as harmless elderly tourists. They also played the parents of John Larroquette's character, Dan Fielding - "Daddy Bob Elmore" and "Mucette Elmore" - on Night Court's season 2 episode, "Dan's Parents."

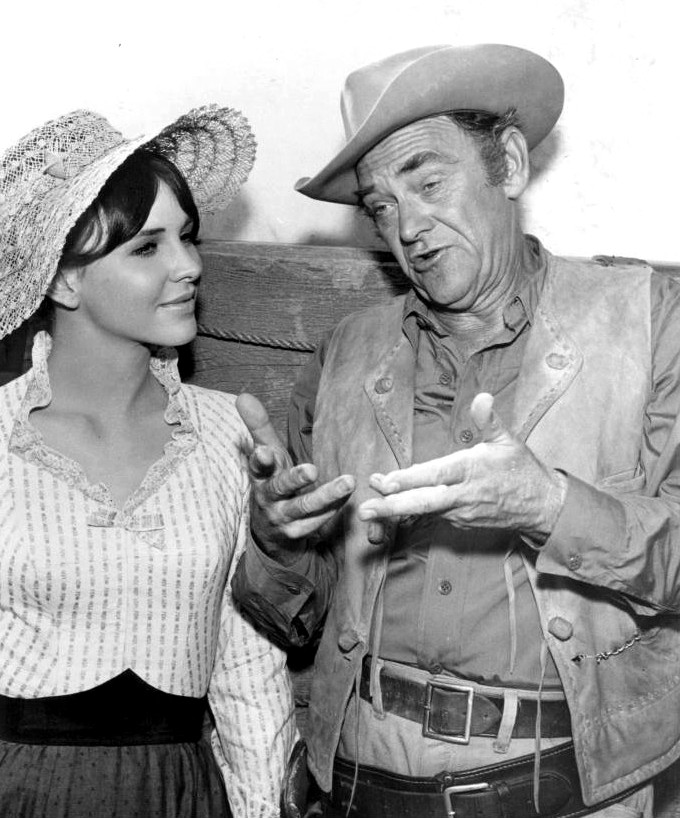
With daughter Holly McIntire on Wagon Train (1963)

McIntire and Nolan also worked together as voice actors. In a 1969 KCET television reading of Norman Corwin's 1938 radio play The Plot to Overthrow Christmas, McIntire played the Devil and Nolan played Lucrezia Borgia. In 1977 they appeared in the Disney animated film The Rescuers, in which he voiced the cat Rufus and she the muskrat Ellie Mae. Four years later, the couple worked on another Disney film, The Fox and the Hound, with McIntire as the voice of Mr. Digger, a badger, and Nolan as the voice of Widow Tweed.

== Personal life ==
McIntire married actress Jeanette Nolan on August 26, 1935, and the couple had two children together, one of whom was actor Tim McIntire. Their daughter Holly McIntire was also an actress, appearing in two episodes of Wagon Train, and later became a photographer.

McIntire died from emphysema and lung cancer at St. Luke's Hospital in Pasadena on January 30, 1991, at the age of 83.

== Partial filmography ==
- The Ramparts We Watch (1940) as narrator, 'Baptism of Fire' footage (uncredited)
- The Hucksters (1947) as Radio Announcer (uncredited)
- Call Northside 777 (1948) as Sam Faxon
- Black Bart (1948) as Clark
- River Lady (1948) as H.L. Morrison
- The Street with No Name (1948) as Cy Gordon
- An Act of Murder (1948) as Judge Ogden
- Command Decision (1948) as Major Belding Davis
- Down to the Sea in Ships (1949) as Thatch
- Red Canyon (1949) as Floyd Cordt
- Scene of the Crime (1949) as Detective Fred Piper
- Top o' the Morning (1949) as Inspector Fallon
- Johnny Stool Pigeon (1949) as Nick Avery
- Ambush (1950) as Frank Holly
- Francis (the Talking Mule) (1950) as General Stevens
- No Sad Songs for Me (1950) as Dr. Ralph Frene
- Shadow on the Wall (1950) as Pike Ludwell
- The Asphalt Jungle (1950) as Police Commissioner Hardy
- Winchester '73 (1950) as Joe Lamont
- Saddle Tramp (1950) as Jess Higgins
- Walk Softly, Stranger (1950) as Morgan
- You're in the Navy Now (1951) as Commander W. R. Reynolds
- That's My Boy (1951) as Dr. Benjamin Green
- The Raging Tide (1951) as Corky Mullins
- Westward the Women (1951) as Roy E. Whitman
- Glory Alley (1952) as Gabe Jordan
- The World in His Arms (1952) as Deacon Greathouse
- Sally and Saint Anne (1952) as Alderman Percival Xavier 'Goldtooth' McCarthy
- Horizons West (1952) as Ira Hammond
- The Lawless Breed (1953) as J.G. Hardin / John Clements
- The Mississippi Gambler (1953) as Kansas John Polly
- The President's Lady (1953) as John Overton
- A Lion Is in the Streets (1953) as Jeb Brown
- War Arrow (1953) as Colonel Jackson Meade
- Apache (1954) as Al Sieber
- The Far Country (1954) as Judge Gannon
- Four Guns to the Border (1954) as Dutch
- The Yellow Mountain (1954) as Bannon
- Stranger on Horseback (1955) as Josiah Bannerman
- The Phenix City Story (1955) as Albert L. Patterson
- The Kentuckian (1955) as Zack Wakefield
- The Scarlet Coat (1955) as General Robert Howe
- To Hell and Back (1955) as Narrator (uncredited)
- Medal of Honor (1955) as Himself
- The Spoilers (1955) as Dextry
- World in My Corner (1956) as Dave Bernstein
- Backlash (1956) as Jim Bonniwell
- I've Lived Before (1956) as Dr. Thomas Bryant
- Away All Boats (1956) as Old Man / Film Intro Voice-over
- The Tin Star (1957) as Dr. Joseph Jefferson 'Doc' McCord
- The Mark of the Hawk (1957) as Bruce Craig
- Alfred Hitchcock Presents (1958) (Season 3 Episode 16: "Sylvia") as John Leeds
- Sing, Boy, Sing (1958) as Reverend Farley Walker
- The Light in the Forest (1958) as John Elder
- The Gunfight at Dodge City (1959) as Doc Sam Tremaine
- Alfred Hitchcock Presents (1960) (Season 5 Episode 21: "Hitch Hike") as Charles Underhill
- Who Was That Lady? (1960) as Bob Doyle
- Psycho (1960) as Sheriff Al Chambers
- Elmer Gantry (1960) (with Burt Lancaster) as Reverend John Pengilly
- Seven Ways from Sundown (1960) as Texas Ranger Sergeant Henessey
- Flaming Star (1960) (with Elvis Presley) as Sam 'Pa' Burton
- Two Rode Together (1961) (with James Stewart and Richard Widmark) as Major Frazer
- Summer and Smoke (1961) as Dr. Buchanan
- Daniel Boone (1964 TV series) (1965) Timothy Patrick Bryan - S1/E22 "The Reunion"
- Daniel Boone (1964 TV series) (1965) Timothy Patrick Bryan - S2/E10 "The Thanksgiving Story"
- Rough Night in Jericho (1967) as Ben Hickman
- Bayou Boy (1971) as Father Boudreau
- Herbie Rides Again (1974) as Mr. Judson
- Rooster Cogburn (1975) as Judge Parker
- Challenge to Be Free (1975) as Narrator (voice)
- The Rescuers (1977) as Rufus (voice)
- The Incredible Hulk (1980) as Agent Preston DeKalb
- The Fox and the Hound (1981) as The Badger (voice)
- Goliath Awaits (1981) as Senator Oliver Bartholomew
- Honkytonk Man (1982) as Grandpa
- Cloak & Dagger (1984), (with wife Jeanette Nolan) as George MacCready
- Night Court (1985) (with wife Jeanette Nolan) as Bob Elmore
- Diff'rent Strokes (1985) as Mr. Hunter
- Turner & Hooch (1989) as Amos Reed (final film role)
