= Whitefield, Maine =

Town in the State of Maine, United States

- Town
- Seal

- Location in Lincoln County and the state of Maine
- Coordinates: 44°12′20″N 69°36′40″W
- Country: United States
- State: Maine
- County: Lincoln
- Incorporation: June 19, 1809

Area
  - Total: 47.51 sq mi (123.05 km^{2})
  - Land: 46.82 sq mi (121.26 km^{2})
  - Water: 0.69 sq mi (1.79 km^{2})
- Elevation: 177 ft (54 m)

Population (2020)
  - Total: 2,408
  - Density: 52/sq mi (19.9/km^{2})
- Time zone: UTC-5 (Eastern (EST))
  - Summer (DST): UTC-4 (EDT)
- ZIP Codes: 04353 (Whitefield); 04341 (Coopers Mills)
- Area code: 207
- FIPS code: 23-85010
- GNIS feature ID: 582811
- Website: www.townofwhitefield.com

Whitefield is a town in Lincoln County, Maine, United States. The population was 2,408 at the 2020 census. Whitefield is named for the celebrated British evangelist George Whitefield, who inspired the colonists before the town was settled in 1770, mainly by Irish Catholics. They remembered him when incorporation came in 1809. In the early twenty-first century it was the boyhood home of Sean and Jamie Oshima, who formed their folk-pop duo Oshima Brothers there. Whitefield is included in the Augusta, Maine micropolitan New England City and Town Area.

== Geography ==
According to the United States Census Bureau, the town has a total area of 47.51 square miles (123.05 km^{2}), of which 46.82 square miles (121.26 km^{2}) is land and 0.69 square miles (1.79 km^{2}) is water.

== Demographics ==
Historical population
Census	Pop.	Note	%±
1810	995		—
1820	1,429		43.6%
1830	2,020		41.4%
1840	2,150		6.4%
1850	2,158		0.4%
1860	1,883		−12.7%
1870	1,594		−15.3%
1880	1,511		−5.2%
1890	1,215		−19.6%
1900	1,156		−4.9%
1910	1,056		−8.7%
1920	862		−18.4%
1930	908		5.3%
1940	962		5.9%
1950	1,030		7.1%
1960	1,068		3.7%
1970	1,131		5.9%
1980	1,606		42.0%
1990	1,931		20.2%
2000	2,273		17.7%
2010	2,300		1.2%
2020	2,408		4.7%
U.S. Decennial Census

=== 2010 census ===
As of the census of 2010, there were 2,300 people, 917 households, and 643 families living in the town. The population density was 49.1 inhabitants per square mile (19.0/km^{2}). There were 1,055 housing units at an average density of 22.5 per square mile (8.7/km^{2}). The racial makeup of the town was 97.8% White, 0.3% African American, 0.4% Native American, 0.3% Asian, and 1.1% from two or more races. Hispanic or Latino people of any race were 1.1% of the population.

There were 917 households, of which 30.9% had children under the age of 18 living with them, 55.9% were married couples living together, 9.4% had a female householder with no husband present, 4.8% had a male householder with no wife present, and 29.9% were non-families. 22.4% of all households were made up of individuals, and 8% had someone living alone who was 65 years of age or older. The average household size was 2.47 and the average family size was 2.87.

The median age in the town was 44.1 years. 21.6% of residents were under the age of 18; 6% were between the ages of 18 and 24; 23.9% were from 25 to 44; 35.5% were from 45 to 64; and 12.9% were 65 years of age or older. The gender makeup of the town was 50.3% male and 49.7% female.

=== 2000 census ===
As of the census of 2000, there were 2,273 people, 844 households, and 620 families living in the town. The population density was 48.5 inhabitants per square mile (18.7/km^{2}). There were 954 housing units at an average density of 20.4 per square mile (7.9/km^{2}). The racial makeup of the town was 97.23% White, 0.18% African American, 1.23% Native American, 0.35% Asian, 0.18% Pacific Islander, 0.13% from other races, and 0.70% from two or more races. Hispanic or Latino people of any race were 0.88% of the population.

There were 844 households, out of which 35.7% had children under the age of 18 living with them, 61.1% were married couples living together, 8.6% had a female householder with no husband present, and 26.5% were non-families. 20.0% of all households were made up of individuals, and 5.9% had someone living alone who was 65 years of age or older. The average household size was 2.62 and the average family size was 3.02.

In the town, the population was spread out, with 26.4% under the age of 18, 5.6% from 18 to 24, 29.5% from 25 to 44, 26.8% from 45 to 64, and 11.7% who were 65 years of age or older. The median age was 38 years. For every 100 females, there were 98.0 males. For every 100 females age 18 and over, there were 97.6 males.

The median income for a household in the town was $38,477, and the median income for a family was $41,994. Males had a median income of $27,917 versus $21,750 for females. The per capita income for the town was $16,456. About 8.2% of families and 12.5% of the population were below the poverty line, including 14.6% of those under age 18 and 19.9% of those age 65 or over.

== Amish settlement ==
An Amish settlement was started in Whitefield in 2017. It grew from three families in March 2017 to 13 families in August 2018.

== Notable people ==
- William Farley, Medal of Honor recipient during the American Civil War
- Sean and Jamie Oshima of the folk-pop duo Oshima Brothers
