= Tim McIntire =

American actor (1944–1986)

- Born: Timothy John McIntire; July 19, 1944; Yaak, Montana, U.S.
- Died: April 15, 1986 (aged 41); Los Angeles, California, U.S.
- Occupation: Actor
- Years active: 1963–1984
- Parent(s): John McIntire, Jeanette Nolan
- Relatives: Holly Wright (sister)

Timothy John McIntire (July 19, 1944 – April 15, 1986) was an American character actor who starred as Alan Freed in the film American Hot Wax (1978), as singer George Jones in the television movie Stand by Your Man (1981), and for his performances in The Gumball Rally (1976) and Brubaker (1980).

== Biography ==
McIntire co-starred as Dickie, the son-in-law in the 1968 pilot Justice for All, which eventually (1971) was picked up as the series All in the Family, with Rob Reiner as the son-in-law.

McIntire's film roles include appearances in Shenandoah (1965); The Thousand Plane Raid (1969); The Sterile Cuckoo (1969); Aloha, Bobby and Rose (1975); The Gumball Rally (1976); The Choirboys (1977); Brubaker (1980); Fast-Walking (1982) and Sacred Ground (1983).

McIntire appeared in the 1965 episode "The Lawless Have Laws" as Lorenz Oatman in the television series Death Valley Days. He also appeared in six episodes of Kung Fu, four of them as the long-lost brother of Kwai Chang Caine. Other television roles include appearances in the Western The Legend of Jesse James, the 1965 episode "The Storm" on the television Western Gunsmoke, the 1966 episode "Gauntlet of Fire" of the series 12 O'Clock High, and the 1976 miniseries Rich Man, Poor Man and Rich Man, Poor Man Book II. He also was in The Invaders episodes "Genesis" and "Dark Outpost" (1967–68).

McIntire composed music for the soundtracks of films, television, and radio commercials, including Jeremiah Johnson (1972) and A Boy and His Dog (1975), for which he provided the voice of the dog, played by Tiger. He provided the devil's voice for the demon baby on Soap (1979).

McIntire, who had sung a country style ballad and played guitar throughout the storyline in The Fugitive episode 'Ill Wind' in 1966, displayed his vocal and musical talent later along with six studio musicians, forming the band Funzone, which released one self-titled album in 1977. McIntire is credited with lead vocal, guitar, and fiddle on the album. When the record label behind the band collapsed, so did the band, and McIntire focused his musical energies on soundtracks.

McIntire was the son of actors John McIntire of the television Westerns Wagon Train and The Virginian and Jeanette Nolan, who made more than 300 television appearances and was nominated for four Emmy Awards. His older sister was the actress and photographer Holly Wright. McIntire appeared four times with both his parents on television, first on the 1966 episode "Ill Wind" of the series The Fugitive, then the 1966 episode "Old Charlie" of the series Bonanza, followed by the 1968 episodes "Death Wagon" and "Nora" of The Virginian. He was also in a Bonanza episode entitled Logan's Treasure.

He appeared with his father in the 1966 episode "The Cave-In" of the series The F.B.I.

== Death ==
McIntire died at the age of 41 on April 15, 1986, from congestive heart failure in Los Angeles. He is buried at Tobacco Valley Cemetery in Eureka, Montana.

== Filmography ==
Year	Title	Role	Notes
1965	Shenandoah	Henry Anderson	
1966	Follow Me, Boys!	Corporal	uncredited
1969	The Thousand Plane Raid	Lieutenant Quimby	
1969	The Sterile Cuckoo	Charlie Schumacher	
1975	A Boy and His Dog	Blood	voice
1975	Aloha, Bobby and Rose	Buford	
1976	The Gumball Rally	Steve 'Smitty' Smith, Ferrari Team	
1977	The Choirboys	Roscoe Rules	
1978	American Hot Wax	Alan Freed	
1980	Brubaker	Huey Rauch	
1982	Fast-Walking	Wasco	
1983	Sacred Ground	Matt Colter	
