= Coopers Mills, Maine =

- Village
- Location within Maine Location within the United States
- Coordinates: 44°15′32″N 69°33′07″W
- Country: United States
- State: Maine
- County: Lincoln
- Town: Whitefield
- Elevation: 187 ft (57 m)
- Time zone: UTC-5 (Eastern (EST))
  - Summer (DST): UTC-4 (EDT)
- ZIP code: 04341
- Area code: 207
- GNIS feature ID: 564352

Coopers Mills is an unincorporated village in the town of Whitefield, Lincoln County, Maine, United States. The community is located along Maine State Route 17, 11.8 miles (19.0 km) east-southeast of Augusta. Coopers Mills has a post office with ZIP code 04341.
