= List of The Texas Chainsaw Massacre (franchise) characters =

This is a list of characters that appear in The Texas Chainsaw Massacre horror film franchise.

== Cast overview ==
=== Continuity A (1974–1995) ===
| Characters | Continuity A | | | |
| Characters | The Texas Chain Saw Massacre | The Texas Chainsaw Massacre 2 | Leatherface: The Texas Chainsaw Massacre III | The Return of the Texas Chainsaw Massacre |
|---|---|---|---|---|
| Characters | 1974 | 1986 | 1990 | 1995 |
| Leatherface "Bubba/Junior/Leather" Sawyer | Gunnar Hansen | Bill Johnson | R. A. Mihailoff | Robert Jacks |
| Sally Hardesty-Enright | Marilyn Burns | Mentioned | Mentioned | Marilyn Burns^{C} |
| Drayton Sawyer | Jim Siedow | Jim Siedow | | |
| Nubbins Sawyer | Edwin Neal | Corpse | | |
| Grandpapa Sawyer | John Dugan | Corpse | | Grayson Victor Schirmacher |
| Franklin Hardesty | Paul A. Partain | Corpse | Mentioned | Paul A. Partain^{C} |
| Kurtis "Kirk" Watsanen | William Vail | Mentioned | | |
| Jeremiah "Jerry" Huberman | Allen Danziger | Mentioned | | |
| Pamela "Pam" Willard | Teri McMinn | Mentioned | | |
| Lt. Boude "Lefty" Enright | | Dennis Hopper | | |
| Vanita "Stretch" Brock | | Caroline Williams | Caroline Williams^{C}^{V} | |
| Robert "Chop Top" Sawyer | | Bill Moseley | | |
| L. G. Peters | | Lou Perry | | |
| Michelle | | | Kate Hodge | |
| Benny | | | Ken Foree | |
| Ryan | | | William Butler | |
| Sara | | | Toni Hudson | |
| Edward "Tex" Sawyer | | | Viggo Mortensen | |
| Tinker "Tink" Sawyer | | | Joe Unger | |
| Alfredo Sawyer | | | Tom Everett | |
| Anne "Mama" Sawyer | | | Miriam Byrd-Nethery | |
| Jennifer "Jenny" | | | | Renée Zellweger |
| Vilmer Sawyer | | | | Matthew McConaughey |
| Darla | | | | Tonie Perensky |
| Heather | | | | Lisa Marie Newmyer |
| Walter Edward "W. E." Sawyer | | | | Joe Stevens |
| Sean | | | | John Harrison |
| Barry | | | | Tyler Cone |
| Rothman | | | | James Gale |

=== Platinum Dunes continuity (2003–2006) ===
| Characters | The Platinum Dunes continuity | |
| Characters | The Texas Chainsaw Massacre | The Texas Chainsaw Massacre: The Beginning |
|---|---|---|
| Characters | 2003 | 2006 |
| Leatherface Thomas Brown Hewitt | Andrew Bryniarski | Andrew Bryniarski |
| Sheriff Winston Hoyt Charlton "Charlie" Hewitt Jr. | R. Lee Ermey | R. Lee Ermey |
| Luda Mae Hewitt | Marietta Marich | Marietta Marich Allison Marich^{Y} |
| Monty Hewitt | Terrence Evans | Terrence Evans |
| Erin Hardesty | Jessica Biel | |
| Morgan Hardesty | Jonathan Tucker | |
| Pepper Harrington | Erica Leerhsen | |
| Andy Gordone | Mike Vogel | |
| Kemper Sterling | Eric Balfour | |
| Hitchhiker | Lauren German | |
| Jedidiah Hewitt | David Dorfman | |
| Henrietta Hewitt | Heather Kafka | |
| Tea Lady | Kathy Lamkin | Kathy Lamkin |
| The Narrator | John Larroquette^{V} | John Larroquette^{V} |
| Chrissie | | Jordana Brewster |
| Eric Hill | | Matt Bomer |
| Dean Hill | | Taylor Handley |
| Bailey | | Diora Baird |
| Alex | | Cyia Batten |
| Holden | | Lee Tergesen |
| Sheriff Winston Hoyt | | Lew Temple |

=== Continuity B (1974, 2013–2017) ===
| Characters | Continuity B | | |
| Characters | The Texas Chain Saw Massacre | Texas Chainsaw 3D | Leatherface |
|---|---|---|---|
| Characters | 1974 | 2013 | 2017 |
| Leatherface Jedidiah Sawyer | Gunnar Hansen | Dan Yeager | Sam Strike Boris Kabakchiev^{Y} |
| Sally Hardesty | Marilyn Burns | Marilyn Burns^{A}^{P} | |
| Drayton Sawyer | Jim Siedow | Bill Moseley | Dimo Alexiev |
| Grandfather Sawyer | John Dugan | John Dugan | Eduard Parsehyan |
| Nubbins Sawyer | Edwin Neal | Edwin Neal^{A} | Dejan Angelov |
| Franklin Hardesty | Paul A. Partain | Paul A. Partain^{A} | |
| Kurtis "Kirk" Watsanen | William Vail | William Vail^{A} | |
| Jeremiah "Jerry" Huberman | Allen Danziger | Allen Danziger^{A} | |
| Pamela "Pam" Willard | Teri McMinn | Teri McMinn^{A} | |
| Heather Miller Edith Rose Sawyer | | Alexandra Daddario | |
| Mayor Burt Hartman | | Paul Rae | |
| Deputy Carl Hartman | | Scott Eastwood | |
| Sheriff Hooper | | Thom Barry | |
| Verna Carson (née Sawyer) | | Marilyn Burns^{O} | Lili Taylor^{Y} |
| Farnsworth | | Richard Riehle | Nathan Cooper |
| Ryan | | Trey Songz | |
| Nikki | | Tania Raymonde | |
| Kenny | | Keram Malicki-Sánchez | |
| Gavin Miller | | David Born | |
| Arlene Miller | | Sue Rock | |
| Boss Sawyer | | Gunnar Hansen | |
| Loretta Sawyer | | Dodie L. Brown | |
| Elizabeth "Lizzy" White | | | Vanessa Grasse |
| Texas Ranger Hal Hartman | | | Stephen Dorff |
| Ike | | | James Bloor |
| Bud | | | Sam Coleman |
| Clarice | | | Jessica Madsen |
| Betty Hartman | | | Lorina Kamburova |
| Ted Hardesty | | | Julian Kostov |

=== Continuity C (1974, 2022) ===
| Characters | Continuity C | |
| Characters | The Texas Chain Saw Massacre | Texas Chainsaw Massacre |
|---|---|---|
| Characters | 1974 | 2022 |
| Leatherface "Bubba/Junior/Leather" Sawyer | Gunnar Hansen | Mark Burnham |
| Sally Hardesty | Marilyn Burns | Olwen Fouéré^{O} Marilyn Burns^{Y}^{A}^{P} |
| Franklin Hardesty | Paul A. Partain | Paul A. Partain^{P} |
| Kurtis "Kirk" Watsanen | William Vail | William Vail^{P} |
| Jeremiah "Jerry" Huberman | Allen Danziger | Allen Danziger^{P} |
| Pamela "Pam" Willard | Teri McMinn | Teri McMinn^{P} |
| Drayton Sawyer | Jim Siedow | Mentioned |
| Grandfather Sawyer | John Dugan | Mentioned |
| Nubbins Sawyer | Edwin Neal | Mentioned |
| Lila | | Elsie Fisher |
| Melody | | Sarah Yarkin |
| Ritcher | | Moe Dunford |
| Dante Spivey | | Jacob Latimore |
| Ruth | | Nell Hudson |
| Catherine | | Jessica Allain |
| Virginia "Ginny" McCumber | | Alice Krige |

== Killer families ==
The Sawyers (renamed the Hewitts in the 2003 reboot and its 2006 prequel) are a large, Southern American family of cannibalistic butchers and serial killers in The Texas Chainsaw Massacre franchise, who live in the Texas backwoods, where they abduct, torture, murder, and eat stranded motorists. The family uses booby traps and man-traps, such as bear traps and spike traps, to capture or kill victims. The family also owns a gas station, where they sell the meat from the victims as barbecue and chili. In the crossover comic book series, Jason vs. Leatherface, it is explained that the Sawyer family engaged in inbreeding, something that was heavily implied in the third film. As seen in 1986's The Texas Chainsaw Massacre 2, 1990's Leatherface: The Texas Chainsaw Massacre III, the 2003 remake, and the 2006 prequel, the family (both Sawyer and Hewitt) are fond of leaving bodies in mass body pits or mass graves in various parts of Texas. The inspiration for the family was real killer Ed Gein, whom the filmmakers also based Leatherface on.

=== The Sawyer family ===
==== Leatherface ====
Leatherface is an intellectually disabled and disfigured serial killer who uses a chainsaw to kill his victims. He was portrayed by Gunnar Hansen in the original 1974 film, The Texas Chain Saw Massacre, Bill Johnson in 1986's The Texas Chainsaw Massacre 2, R. A. Mihailoff in 1990's Leatherface: The Texas Chainsaw Massacre III, Robert Jacks in 1995's Texas Chainsaw Massacre: The Next Generation, Andrew Bryniarski in the Platinum Dunes films: 2003's The Texas Chainsaw Massacre and 2006's The Texas Chainsaw Massacre: The Beginning, Dan Yeager in 2013's Texas Chainsaw 3D, and Sam Strike in 2017's Leatherface. Leatherface is portrayed as being "severely intellectually disabled and mentally disturbed", and often uses butchering tools, like meat hooks, to slaughter his victims. He lives with a family of fellow cannibals, who are often abusive and violent towards him. Despite this, Leatherface does whatever his family orders him to do. The character was loosely inspired by serial killer Ed Gein, who also wore the skin of his victims, cross dressed, and was possibly a cannibal.

His name has been given differently in different films. Chop Top calls him "Bubba" in the second movie while in Texas Chainsaw 3D, his name is Jedidiah. In the third film, he is only referred to as Junior by his family. In the fourth film, Leatherface is called "Leather" by his relatives. Whereas many horror movie villains are sadistic or evil; Leatherface is in fact intellectually disabled and most of the time is merely following the orders of his family. Hansen has stated that Leatherface is "completely under the control of his family. He'll do whatever they tell him to do. He's a little bit afraid of them". Tobe Hooper has argued on the documentary, The Shocking Truth, that Leatherface is a 'big baby' and kills in self-defense because he feels threatened, pointing out that, in the first film, Leatherface is actually frightened of all the new people entering his house. Leatherface is also mute, aside from making bizarre, baby-like gibberish and screams, which his family somehow understands.

The Texas Chainsaw Massacre 2 is a sequel to the 1974 film. Tobe Hooper said on The Shocking Truth that he wanted to expand on the dark comedy in the original film, an element that he felt no one truly picked up on. In this film, Leatherface develops a "crush" on one of his victims and, in one scene, skins off the face of her friend (while alive) and places it on her to hide her from the rest of his family. At the end of the film, he apparently dies in an explosion. Leatherface is later seen in Leatherface: The Texas Chainsaw Massacre III which is a follow-up to previous two films.

Leatherface: The Texas Chainsaw Massacre III, is the second sequel in The Texas Chainsaw Massacre film series. Leatherface is affectionately called "Junior" by the members of his family. The filmmakers attempted to make the series darker and grittier like the original, but interventions from the MPAA quashed their vision and had them tone it down and change the ending. An uncut version was released in 2003. In this film, Leatherface is given a new family, including a daughter. A four issue comic series based on the film, entitled Leatherface, was also created. In this film, Leatherface appears much more aggressive and violent than in previous installments, a trait intentionally added, as it is explained on the audio commentary that Leatherface was in a childlike mode in the first two films and now he has reached the rebellious teen mode.

Texas Chainsaw Massacre: The Next Generation features Leatherface as a transvestite involved in an Illuminati conspiracy to provide society a source of horror.

Texas Chainsaw 3D is a direct sequel to the 1974 original film and starts immediately after Sally Hardesty's escape. Sheriff Hooper arrives right after the extended Sawyer family gather to the house with shotguns, in which the sheriff demands Drayton, now revealed to be Leatherface's father, hand over Leatherface. Drayton attempts to justify his and "Jed's" actions by arguing that the characters from the first film were trespassing, but ultimately the family agrees to give him "Jed", with Drayton scolding him for letting Sally escape. Just as they prepare to send Leatherface out to Sheriff Hooper, a group of townspeople led by Burt Hartman shoot up the house, killing nearly all of the Sawyer clan before burning the house down with a Molotov cocktail, killing all but "Leatherface", his cousin, Loretta Sawyer, and her baby. Loretta, wounded via a gunshot, attempts to receive help from one of the townspeople, only to be killed and have her baby taken. Leatherface, who was believed to have died in the fire, was hidden and cared for by his aunt/mother, Verna Sawyer Carson.

In the 2017 prequel, Leatherface, his background is explored further. He initially recoiled at his family's crimes, but later agreed to participate. After helping his family kill Sheriff Hartman's daughter, he was taken to a mental institution where he was renamed Jackson. When Verna comes to visit him, a riot breaks out. Jackson and other patients Isaac, Clarice, and Bud escape, along with their nurse Elizabeth as a hostage. During the flight, everyone but Jackson and Elizabeth are killed. After Elizabeth sought help from a police officer, Jackson was shot through his cheeks by Hartman, caught, and hung by a chain. The Sawyers rescue him, sewing his injured cheeks together, bounding them with a muzzle. He is then pressured to kill Hartman and Elizabeth. He uses the top half of Hartman's face and the bottom half of Elizabeth's to make his first mask.

==== Drayton Sawyer (The Cook) ====
Drayton Sawyer, is portrayed by Jim Siedow in The Texas Chain Saw Massacre and The Texas Chainsaw Massacre 2 where he served as the main antagonist, by Bill Moseley in Texas Chainsaw 3D, and by Dimo Alexiev in Leatherface.

In all of his appearances, Drayton is an antagonist and appears to be the head of the Sawyer Family. Depending on the continuity, he is either the older brother or the father of Leatherface and the rest of the family. A mentally unstable and murderous cannibal, Drayton, along with his family of fellow cannibals and serial killers, lives in the backwoods of Texas, preying upon travelers, whom he and his relatives capture and devour, selling some of their meat to unwary people as barbecue at his restaurant/gas station. He also gets mad at Leatherface for ruining the house. Drayton's name was not mentioned until the second film; the first simply referred to him as "the Cook" and "the Old Man". Like the Hitchhiker, Drayton seems to have a mental disorder. His personality disorder has been discussed by Tobe Hooper several times, like on the audio commentary for 1986's The Texas Chainsaw Massacre 2. Drayton often bickers with the rest of his brothers and is abusive towards them. Although Drayton appears to be the head of the household, his brothers often mock and antagonize him and his authority.

Drayton Sawyer made his debut appearance in The Texas Chain Saw Massacre, in which he first appears as the mild-mannered, middle-aged proprietor of the Last Chance Gas Station, a rural Gulf Oil gas station and barbecue shop (with an unnamed car door window washer as an employee), where a group of teenagers stop for fuel while passing through the area. He tells the teenagers that he has no gas for their van because he is supposedly waiting for the tanker truck to show up with fuel. When he learns that the teenagers' destination is an abandoned house near his property, he casually advises the youths against going around there. Drayton's malevolent nature is revealed later in the film, when he beats Sally Hardesty (Marilyn Burns) unconscious and captures her after she approaches him seeking help when her friends disappear and her brother Franklin (Paul A. Partain) is killed by Leatherface. Having been chased by Leatherface previously, she is highly hysterical after her shocking experience. Taking Sally to his home, Drayton torments her alongside Leatherface (Gunnar Hansen) and the Hitchhiker (Edwin Neal) before deciding to let the family patriarch, Grandpa (John Dugan), kill her. When Grandpa proves too decrepit to kill Sally with a hammer, Drayton, the Hitchhiker and Leatherface attempt to aid him, but only succeed in losing grasp on Sally, who flees out a window. Drayton is the only one of the three active members of the family who does not pursue Sally, choosing instead to stay behind with Grandpa. The more humane side of Drayton is revealed during the so-called "dinner scene" when he states: "I just can't take no pleasure in killing" after the Hitchhiker accuses him of doing nothing but cooking for the family while he and Leatherface do all the killing, which explains why Drayton beat and captured Sally rather than killing her.

In The Texas Chainsaw Massacre 2, Drayton reappears, now he and his family are living in an abandoned amusement park in Dallas (called Texas Battle Land), due to the intense police investigation sparked by the events of the first film, with what remains of his family, Leatherface (Bill Johnson), Chop Top (Bill Moseley) and Grandpa (Ken Evert). Now a two-time award-winning chili cook selling his meat at a chilli cook-off (dismissing the bones and teeth as peppercorns), Drayton appears far more unhinged than in the previous film, happily joining in on his family's murderous frenzies, which previously disturbed him somewhat. In public, Drayton displays a folksy and happy personality, but alone with his family, he displays his deranged mental disease and is very abusive with them. Drayton presumably dies, off-screen, at the end of the film, when, during the fight between Leatherface and Lieutenant "Lefty" Enright (Dennis Hopper), he is accidentally struck by Leatherface and the hand grenade he is holding (planning to commit suicide and destroy the hideout with) explodes prematurely.

The only reference of Drayton made in Leatherface: The Texas Chainsaw Massacre III was when Sawyer brother Tinker gives a large chromed chainsaw he crafted to Leatherface as a gift, on the saw's blade he engraved a quote of Drayton's from the second film ("The saw is family").

In Topps Comics' 1995 comic miniseries Jason vs. Leatherface, Drayton, only identified by the name Cook Slaughter, appears as a main character. After Leatherface and the Hitchhiker bring Jason Voorhees, the main antagonist of the Friday the 13th franchise home, Drayton befriends him and inducts him in as an unofficial member of the Slaughter family.

The comics expand on Drayton's back story, revealing that, though he aspires to gain fame and fortune using his culinary skills in the city, he stays in the Texan backwoods due to a vow he made to his younger sister Velma on her deathbed, promising he would always look after her children, the Hitchhiker and Leatherface. The comics imply that he is both their father and uncle and they were merely adopted and treated by him as brothers: they suggest that Leatherface and Hitchhiker were born of incest between Drayton and Velma Sawyer as they refer to Velma as having been both their sister and mother. The comics also portray Drayton as much more apathetic and lax towards his relatives murdering of people, with him, at one point, stating that he wishes the Hitchhiker and Jason, who had just delivered to him a freshly killed couple, had brought him some children as well ("their meat's so much more tender..."). At one point in the comics, Drayton even attacks Jason with a meat cleaver and helps dispose of his body, which the Sawyer brothers dump into a lake. Drayton is also seen wearing an apron which reads "Kiss the Cook" throughout the series.

Bill Moseley, the actor who portrayed Chop Top, portrayed Drayton in the opening scene of Texas Chainsaw 3D. When Sheriff Hooper arrives at the Sawyer house from which Sally escaped earlier that day, Drayton comes out with a shotgun and tries justifying his family's actions by arguing that the characters from the first film were trespassing. Drayton is accompanied by Grandpa, two older male relatives named Boss Sawyer and Bear Sawyer, four unidentified gunmen and a younger woman named Loretta, who holds a baby named Edith-Rose Sawyer. Boss tries convincing Drayton to give Leatherface, whose real name is Jedidiah, to Hooper. Drayton argues that Jed is family, but Boss retorts that "the boy is simple," to which Bear agrees. Drayton gives in, and Boss informs Hooper that they are bringing out Jed. Drayton goes to Leatherface's room and scolds him for attracting the police. Before he can be brought out, local residents of Newt led by Burt Hartman, arrive and burn down the house. Drayton is apparently shot to death. In 2012, Edith-Rose, who survived, was adopted, and renamed Heather Miller, walks through the Sawyer cemetery at her grandma Verna's house, and one of the gravestones has Drayton's name on it.

==== Nubbins Sawyer (The Hitchhiker) ====
Nubbins Sawyer appears in The Texas Chain Saw Massacre. Edwin Neal portrays him as a mentally unstable and murderous cannibal and grave robber; he lives with his equally depraved family, the Sawyers, in the back roads of Texas, capturing, torturing, and feasting on unwary travelers. Though sadistic and violent, he is generally one of the least threatening characters in the movie, being not very intelligent, and behaving erratically. The character also has a bizarre speech impediment and a large port-wine stain birthmark on the right side of his face. His speech impediment came from the actor who portrayed him, Edwin Neal, who played the Hitchhiker as someone with schizophrenia.

Nubbins first appears in The Texas Chain Saw Massacre walking along a road, where he is picked up by a group of friends traveling through the area, who feel sorry for him having to walk in the heat. The group ask him what he was doing out there and he tells them that he was "over at the slaughterhouse" where he and "his brother" and "his grandfather" used to work and shows them pictures of him and his family killing the cattle while telling them a story about how headcheese comes from the cows there when their heads are melted, all the while attempting to get them to drop him off at his home and even inviting them to dinner. The Hitchhiker soon begins acting erratically after being given back the photographs by the disgusted travelers, slashing his own hand with a pocket knife; after Franklin Hardesty (Paul A. Partain) refuses to buy a picture he took of him, the Hitchhiker sets the photo on fire and slashes Franklin's arm with a straight razor before being kicked out of the van. The Hitchhiker briefly chases after the van, kicking, yelling and smearing a bloody hand print on it, but soon relinquishes his attack on it.

The film later identifies Nubbins as one of the brothers of the main villain of the film, Leatherface (Gunnar Hansen) and of Drayton Sawyer (Jim Siedow), as well as one of the family members of a mentally unstable and murderous family of cannibals. It is also revealed that he was the one responsible for the grave robbings and places the corpses all over the graveyards and took photos mentioned at the beginning of the film. Together, they torment Sally Hardesty (Marilyn Burns), Franklin's sister whom Drayton had captured. Eventually deciding to kill Sally, Nubbins, Drayton and Leatherface are at first content to allow their highly regarded Grandpa (John Dugan) to do so, but when Grandpa proves unable to kill Sally with a hammer, Nubbins and his brothers become impatient and over-eager in trying to help him, Nubbins forgets to keep a hold on Sally, allowing her break free of their grasp and jump out a nearby window; as Sally flees, Nubbins and Leatherface give chase to her, with the Hitchhiker catching up to her on a road. While slashing Sally with a knife, an 18-wheeler fast approaches him. Not noticing this, he continues to try to kill Sally. He soon hears the honking of the truck but is too late to get out of the way as he watches in horror as the truck runs him over, killing him. Deleted scenes shows Nubbins' corpse lying in the road, his dislodged jaw spewing blood.

After the events of the film, Nubbins' remains were gathered and turned into a mummified puppet, seen in The Texas Chainsaw Massacre 2. The corpse is treated as if he is still alive, and is most often seen with his twin brother, Chop Top. Nubbins' pouch contains a grenade, which Drayton uses to blow up the family's lair after Lieutenant Lefty Enright infiltrates their home.

In the Jason vs. Leatherface Topps Comics' miniseries, the Hitchhiker (bearing only a minor resemblance to his film counterpart) appears as a main character. Encountering Jason Voorhees (the main villain of the Friday the 13th franchise) in the woods near the Slaughter house, the Hitchhiker, after seeing Jason non-lethally disarm Leatherface after a brief skirmish and decapitate a man he and Leatherface were chasing, befriends him and takes him home, where Jason is inducted as an unofficial member of the family by Drayton. After a fight happens between Jason and the family, the Hitchhiker "kills" Jason by bashing him in the head with a hammer.

The miniseries expands upon the Hitchhiker's character, revealing that he owns a pet dog named Sparky (whom he killed by shooting in the head and treats as if it were still alive) and that he creates furniture and sculptures out of corpses. The miniseries also showed the extent of the Hitchhiker's abuse of Leatherface whom the Hitchhiker constantly bullies for little or no reason (although he apparently respects Leatherface's prowess at frightening and killing people, as he laments to Jason). The comics also hint that the Hitchhiker, as well as Leatherface, were born of incest, with Drayton's younger sister Velma being implicated as being their sister and mother. The Hitchhiker is also seen driving a tow truck and working at the family gas station, where he sabotages motorists' automobiles. He then informs his family and they attack the newly stranded people. The Hitchhiker's bizarre birth mark also changes shape several times throughout the comics, at one point it takes the form of a swastika and a lightning bolt. After "killing" Jason, the Hitchhiker's brother Drayton (called Cook Slaughter in the comics) implicates that the Hitchhiker killed his own cousin named Emery with a two-by-four after a losing a game of checkers, to which the hitchhiker replies "He shouldn't have laughed at me".

Nubbins appears in the 2017 prequel Leatherface, played by Hristo Milev as a child and Dejan Angelov as a teenager.

==== Grandpa Sawyer ====
Grandpa Sawyer appears in The Texas Chain Saw Massacre, and its sequel, The Texas Chainsaw Massacre 2, portrayed by John Dugan and Ken Evert, respectively, and appears in more of the franchise than any other character besides Leatherface. He is a supercentenarian, a former butcher/slaughterman and, it is implied, a mass murderer. Director Tobe Hooper stated on the audio commentary for The Texas Chainsaw Massacre 2 that Grandpa is kept alive by drinking the blood of his family's victims.

Snippets of Grandfather's history prior to the events of The Texas Chainsaw Massacre films occur throughout the series; it is revealed that Grandfather was originally a worker at a slaughterhouse whose skills at killing and butchering cattle were unmatched. After new technology was implemented in abattoirs, Grandfather quit his job due to "the shame". Grandfather later apparently settled down with the unnamed Grandma and began a family, the cannibalistic Sawyers (how they became cannibalistic is never revealed, though it is implied that they resorted to cannibalism in order to survive starvation, because the family was already poor when Grandpa and the rest of his family quit working).

In The Texas Chain Saw Massacre, the 124-year-old Grandpa (John Dugan) appears as a somewhat minor character, initially thought to be already dead. He is first seen briefly during Leatherface's chase scene, where heroine Sally Hardesty (Marilyn Burns) approaches him seeking help but assumes he is dead when she sees how old he is. Later after Sally is captured by his grandchildren, Drayton (Jim Siedow), Leatherface (Gunnar Hansen) and the Hitchhiker (Edwin Neal), Grandfather is taken from the second floor of the house and brought to her by them. Leatherface proceeds to slash Sally's finger and forces it into Grandpa's mouth, so he can suck her blood (proving that he is, in fact, alive), an event that causes Sally to fall unconscious. Some time after Sally is awakened, Drayton, Leatherface and the Hitchhiker decide to allow Grandpa to end her life through the use of a hammer; due to his advanced age, Grandpa is largely incapable of using the hammer efficiently and continues to drop it. The hassle that ensues with Grandfather's continued dropping of the hammer and his grandchildren's over-eagerness to help him allows Sally to break free of the Sawyer family and jump out a window, though he and Drayton do not attempt to follow her.

Grandpa (Ken Evert), now 137 years old, later appears in The Texas Chainsaw Massacre 2, inhabiting an abandoned theme park named the "Texas Battle Land" with what remains of his family; when the film's heroine, Vanita "Stretch" Brock (Caroline Williams), is captured by his grandson Chop Top (Bill Moseley), Grandpa is brought forth to kill her (in the same way he tried to do to Sally) with help from Chop Top, unlike in the first film here he actually lands a hit, though he succeeds in only causing a minor head wound to her with a sledgehammer (and a second wound caused by an impatient Drayton). When Lieutenant William "Lefty" Hardesty Enright (Dennis Hopper), the film's male protagonist, engages in a chainsaw duel with Leatherface (Bill Johnson), Grandfather attempts to aid his grandson by throwing a hammer at his opponent, only to hit Leatherface instead and subsequently fall to the floor (which alludes the first film's climax). Grandfather apparently meets his demise when a grenade, set off by an injured Drayton (Jim Siedow), Lefty and Leatherface, detonates in close proximity to him.

In Leatherface: The Texas Chainsaw Massacre III, which has connections to The Texas Chain Saw Massacre and The Texas Chainsaw Massacre 2, Grandfather appears only as a decayed corpse kept and treated as if he were alive by Leatherface (R. A. Mihailoff) and his new extended family who regularly pour blood into his mouth to "feed" him; when one of the film's protagonists, Benny (Ken Foree), opens fire on the Sawyer house with an automatic rifle, Grandfather's body takes several shots to the chest and one to the face, but the body is left for the most part intact.

In the 1991 Leatherface comic books by Northstar Comics, which are based upon Leatherface: The Texas Chainsaw Massacre III, Grandfather appears, though he is portrayed as extremely different in this appearance than in others; instead of the solitary and silent figure he is usually shown as a rambling old man with a habit of telling non-linear stories, he also seems to be much younger and more in shape than in the films (he still seems to be much more sane and harmless than the rest of the family though) and appears largely oblivious to his surroundings. It is also revealed by the character Mama that Grandfather is not biologically related to the featured version of the Sawyer family and that he was abandoned as a child and subsequently adopted into it.

In the 1995 film, Texas Chainsaw Massacre: The Next Generation, a character referred to as "Grandfather" (Grayson Victor Schirmacher) appears. In Tobe Hooper's The Texas Chain Saw Massacre, Grandpa was also credited as "Grandfather".

Grandfather appears throughout the 1995 Jason vs. Leatherface comic miniseries by Topps Comics; also in the comics, a picture depicting a much younger Grandfather is found by Jason Voorhees in the attic of the Sawyer house.

John Dugan reprised his role in Texas Chainsaw 3D, in which Grandfather is shown sitting inside the Sawyer house with his relatives as they are confronted by Sheriff Hooper. He is present when the residents of Newt burn down the Sawyer house and kill the family members inside.

A slightly younger Grandpa appears in the 2017 prequel, Leatherface, played by Eduard Parsehyan. In the film's opening, Grandpa is shown with the rest of the family pressuring young Jed to kill a man accused of stealing their pigs. When Jed refuses, Grandpa gets up and kills the man with a hammer, displaying his skills. This is Grandpa's only speaking appearance.

==== "Chop Top" Sawyer ====
Chop Top is the twin brother of Nubbins Sawyer. also has the same bizarre birth mark as his twin brother Nubbins, except Chop Top's is on the left side of his face. He appears in The Texas Chainsaw Massacre 2 as one of the film's villains and is portrayed by Bill Moseley. Chop Top is also in the habit of scratching around his metal plate with a heated clothes hanger; he then eats the dead skin he has picked off., Both director Tobe Hooper and actor Bill Moseley state that if he scratches in the right spot, Chop Top will instantly "get off". It is explained by Tobe Hooper that Chop Top was in Vietnam at the time of the first film. It is in Vietnam where Chop Top receives his head wound by a "lucky gook with a machete". Chop Top has pale skin, like an albino. Tobe Hooper stated on the audio commentary for Texas Chainsaw Massacre 2 that Chop Top's character was originally that of the Hitchhiker, who had a metal plate grafted onto his skull after the events of the 1974 The Texas Chain Saw Massacre and was referred to as "Plate-Head", but the character later evolved into his twin, Chop Top.

Chop Top is a deranged and sadistic individual who gleefully murders people when given the chance. He possesses a "hippie"-like mentality and view on the world around him, stating that "music is his life" and revealing that he is a fan of the bands Iron Butterfly and Humble Pie. Chop Top often remarks about Ho Chi Minh and napalm, as he is a Vietnam veteran, and he also talks about having flashbacks from the war. Chop Top adorns himself in a variety of tattered, multi-colored clothing. In The Texas Chainsaw Massacre 2, Chop Top first appears alongside Leatherface (Bill Johnson) driving a pick up truck. Together they attack a pair of drunk high school motorists who are in a smaller car on a bridge. Chop Top and Leatherface kill the two men, not realizing that their attack on the drivers was being recorded at a radio station the two drunken teens had called using a car phone prior to the attack. When DJ Vanita "Stretch" Brock (Caroline Williams) plays the recording of Chop Top and Leatherface's attack on the drivers over the radio, the two brothers break into the radio station with the intention of killing Stretch, but the brothers' plan is not carried out. Leatherface, having become infatuated with Stretch, tricks Chop Top into believing he had killed her. When the two leave the station, they take an injured co-worker of Vanita's with them.

When Chop Top and brother Drayton (Jim Siedow) discover that Stretch is still alive after finding her in the Sawyer family's home in an abandoned amusement park called the Texas Battle Land (which Chop Top bought using government checks), the brothers hold her captive and decide to let the decrepit patriarch of the Sawyer family, Grandpa (Ken Evert), kill her with Chop Top's help. Vanita is saved when protagonist Lieutenant "Lefty" Enright (Dennis Hopper) arrives and engages Leatherface in a chainsaw duel. The battle between the Sawyers and Lefty reaches a climax when a hand grenade, accidentally set off by Drayton, explodes and kills Grandpa, Lefty, Drayton and possibly Leatherface, as well as presumably destroying the puppet-like corpse of the Hitchhiker.

Narrowly escaping the grenade explosion, Chop Top follows Vanita to the top of the Matterhorn attraction in the Texas Battle Land, which the Sawyers converted into a shrine known as "Chainsaw Heaven". Slashing Vanita and himself several times with a straight razor, Chop Top apparently meets his end when Vanita stumbles upon the mummified corpse of Great-Grandma Sawyer and tears a chainsaw out of the corpse's abdomen. In the ensuing struggle, Chop Top is sent plummeting into the ruins of Texas Battle Land.

Though Chop Top does not appear in the 1991 Leatherface by Northstar Comics, a reference to him is made through the use of his catchphrase "Lick my plate!", seen spray-painted on the side of Alfredo Sawyer's Last Chance Gas Station.

All American Massacre is an unreleased film directed by William Hooper, son of Tobe Hooper. The film was to serve as a prequel to the original Texas Chainsaw Massacre series. The film was to feature Chop Top who had been captured and placed into a psychiatric prison. Memories of how his family became killers and cannibals were to feature in the film, as he was interviewed by a tabloid television journalist. Bill Moseley portrays Chop Top in the film's trailer.

==== Grandma Sawyer ====
Grandma Sawyer died at an unspecified time before the first film's events, although her corpse has been preserved by the family and was originally kept in the attic of the Sawyer ranch. Her corpse also appears in the comic book series, Jason vs. Leatherface.

It is confirmed in the audio commentary on The Texas Chainsaw Massacre 2, by Tobe Hooper, that she is the same "Grandma Sawyer" from the first film, whilst Hooper joked about her change in appearance from the first film to the second being due to "reverence". Drayton in the second film, calls her "Great Grandma"; her skeletal corpse is later seen in "chainsaw heaven" - actually a macabre shrine hidden in the amusement park where the remaining Sawyers live in the second film.

==== Edward "Tex" Sawyer ====
A hitchhiking cowboy and brother of Leatherface, Edward (simply referred to by the shortened name Eddie) completely despises his real name - for unknown reasons - and prefers to be called "Tex", and goes into a rage when referred to by his true name. Tex is also seen wearing a female's cooking apron and painted fingernails, leading to the possibility that he is sexually ambiguous. Tex is portrayed as the most normal looking family member, which helps in his family's capturing of victims, who believe Tex to be a regular person, however, when enraged Tex becomes highly psychotic. Film writer David J. Schow likened him to Norman Bates on the film's audio commentary. In the rated and unrated versions, Tex is killed when set ablaze by survivalist Benny, after Tex attacks him with an ax. In the alternate ending, Tex is set on fire, but survives, and then is killed when Michelle pushes him into a spike trap. Tex (never referred to as Eddie or Edward) is portrayed as one of the more sane members of the family in the Leatherface comics, actually showing some level of remorse for his actions. Tex is killed in the comics by Michelle, who beats and disembowels him with the very knife he was planning to butcher her with. Co-star William Butler claims that his friend, fellow actor Viggo Mortensen's characterization for Tex was as a sexually ambiguous killer who looked normal, but could snap at any moment.

==== Tinker "Tink" Sawyer ====
Another brother of Leatherface and easily one of the least sane members of the family, he has a transradial prosthesis hook in place of a right hand for unknown reasons and an affinity for machines, chrome and technology. As he goes by two different names his real name remains unknown. Tink often makes devices to assist his family in the slaughtering of people, he also drives a very large, suped up pick up truck, similar to a monster truck. One of the devices Tink makes is an extra large chromed out chainsaw for his brother Leatherface, engraved on the blade, a sort-of tribute and reference to his late brother Drayton, the reference being a quote of Drayton's from the second film ("The saw is family"), another invention of Tink's is a swinging sledgehammer machine which quickens the family's slaughter methods, something brother Tex is grateful for (as he personally dislikes the "hit to the head business"). Tink also calls one of the main characters, Benny, an African-American, a "darkie", "brotha" and refers to him as "dark meat", leading to the possibility that he is a racist. Tink also tries to discipline his brother Leatherface by throwing his brother's walkman into the oven, however, this plan backfires when Leatherface forces Tech to retrieve it with his good hand. In both the rated and unrated versions as well as the alternate ending Tink is wounded, possibly fatally, when Benny opens fire on the families' house with an automatic rifle, blasting two of Tink's fingers off, as well as an ear. He appears to have died after the shooting, as he is heard saying to his brother Tex that he would be in Hell for breakfast. In the Leatherface comics, Tink is depicted as a former party loving hippie, like his brother Chop Top from The Texas Chainsaw Massacre 2, and is fixated with classic rock music and a "Chrome Machine God" he believes controls everything. He also mentions taking quaaludes and hash and lush and the purest lysergic acid ever to come from Hashbury. Tink is fatally injured in the comic by being shot repeatedly by Benny, later dying in Leatherface's (who admired Tink, who was his favorite brother) arms. Like his brother Drayton Sawyer, Tink appears as the head of the family household, this role is also explained by writer David J. Schow on the audio commentary for the Leatherface: The Texas Chainsaw Massacre III, in which he refers to Tink as the "brains" of the operation. He is portrayed by Joe Unger.

==== Alfredo Sawyer ====
Another brother of Leatherface, he is portrayed with a speech impediment and heterochromia. He wears a tattered jumpsuit and drives an old pickup truck. Alfredo is also seen kissing a severed head, which implies that he has engaged in necrophilia. At the same time he kisses the head, he mentions that he had a girl in Tupelo, but that she had to "go down below", implying that Alfredo has murdered women outside the state of Texas. He often rants and complains about having to clean up for his family, which includes tossing body parts into the bogs and swamps surrounding his family's home, he also bickers with his brother Tex, who explains that after Alfredo lost his job at the local slaughterhouse, he became insane. In one of his rants, Alfredo refers to his brother Leatherface as "stupid fuck-face". Alfredo also runs the Last Chance Gas Station, which he apparently inherited from his eldest brother Drayton, after his death in The Texas Chainsaw Massacre 2. In Leatherface: The Texas Chainsaw Massacre III, Alfredo serves as the film's antagonist and is killed when, attacking Michelle with a sledgehammer in his pickup truck, she grabs his shotgun lying on the truck's floor and blasts him, his last words being "What are the chances a brainless bitch like you knows how to use that thing?". It is revealed by his brother Tex, that Alfredo worked at the slaughterhouse, but like the rest of his family, he lost his job and went insane. The Leatherface comics depict Alfredo - drawn with an eye patch for unexplained reasons - as even more perverted, insane and dangerous than his film counterpart. Alfredo is killed in the comics' final issue, being forced underwater and drowned by Michelle. Also in the Leatherface comics, Alfredo references his brother Chop Top, as Chop Top's famous line "Lick my plate!" is seen spray painted on Alfredo's gas station. He is portrayed by Tom Everett.

==== Anne Sawyer ====
The mother of Leatherface and the rest of the Sawyer brothers, Anne is a bitter, aged woman who uses a wheelchair full-time and also has an electronic voice box, possibly from a tracheotomy. When Benny begins to blast the families' house with an automatic rifle, Anne dies after taking several shots to the chest as Tech watches on in horror. Anne's role is expanded upon in the Leatherface comics, which depict her as a stereotypical kindly old woman, capable of speaking under her own power and is also shown to be more dangerous than in the film. She is never referred to by name in the film, being called simply "Mama", instead. Mama meets her demise in the comics when her face is smashed in by Benny, who she was holding at gun point, using his automatic rifle. In the film, Anne mentions that she neutered herself and Grandfather. She is portrayed by Miriam Byrd-Nethery.

==== Babi Sawyer ====
Babi is Leatherface's daughter, apparently conceived from the rape of one of his victims. Babi carries around a dead infant doll, which she refers to as "Sally". In both the rated and unrated versions, her fate is unrevealed. In an alternate ending, she's seen at the end in the back of the Sheriff's car, probably arrested, however, her hands weren't cuffed. In the comics based on the film, no reference is made to Babi being Leatherface's child, with her appearing to be just another one of his relatives, possibly Leatherface, Tex, Tink, and Alfredo's younger sister. She is portrayed by Jennifer Banko.

==== David "Bear" Sawyer ====
Bear Sawyer appears in the opening scene of Texas Chainsaw 3D, portrayed by David Bell. He stands with a shotgun alongside Boss Sawyer inside the Sawyer house when Sheriff Hooper arrives. He agrees with Boss' suggestion that they should just give Jedidiah (Leatherface) to the sheriff. He even comments that Leatherface is retarded. He is burned to death by the residents of Newt led by Burt Hartman, along with other relatives in the house.

==== Boss Sawyer ====
A member of the Sawyer family who appears in the beginning of Texas Chainsaw 3D portrayed by Gunnar Hansen, who portrayed Leatherface in the first film. Boss sits inside the Sawyer house with a shotgun when Sheriff Hooper arrives to arrest Leatherface. Boss tries to convince Drayton that they should just give up Leatherface. When Drayton argues that he is family, Boss retorts that Leatherface is "simple" and not right "for a Sawyer." Drayton gives in, and Boss yells out to Hooper that they are bringing him out and asks that "Jed gets a good lawyer." Before they can bring out Jedidiah, however, residents of Newt led by Burt Hartman arrive and burn the Sawyer house to the ground, killing Boss and other relatives.

==== Verna Carson ====
Verna Carson Sawyer is the mother of Jedidiah and Loretta Sawyer and grandmother of Edith Rose Sawyer aka Heather Miller. She is portrayed by Marilyn Burns, who also portrayed heroine Sally Hardesty in The Texas Chain Saw Massacre, and by Lili Taylor in Leatherface.

==== Loretta Sissy Sawyer ====
Loretta Sawyer is the birth mother of Edith Rose Sawyer/Heather Miller. She is portrayed by Dodie L. Brown in Texas Chainsaw 3D.

==== Heather Miller/Edith Rose Sawyer ====
Heather Miller is the main protagonist in Texas Chainsaw 3D and also the long lost cousin of Jed Sawyer / Leatherface. She is portrayed by Alexandra Daddario. On August 19, 1973, she is shown as a baby when the townspeople of Newt, Texas led by Burt Hartman against the sheriff's horror shoot out the house killing nearly all the Sawyers and burn down their house with a Molotov cocktail. Killing all but "Leatherface", Loretta Sawyer and her illegitimate baby (Edith Sawyer) who managed to sneak out, Loretta shot and dying is found by one of the townspeople who takes baby Edith for his own and immediately kills Loretta with a kick to the head.

Verna dies, leaving her vast estate to Edith Sawyer, now "Heather Miller" who she tracked down years before but decided would be safer away from Newt, Texas. Heather, angry at her abusive adoptive parents, decides to go to Newt with her friends and discover her history. Heather enters the mansion and starts looking around, until Leatherface comes out and kills her friends. He chases Heather all the way to a carnival.

She is captured by Burt Hartman (now the mayor) and used as bait for Leatherface. When he finds her, he discovers Heather is his cousin thanks to a mark on her chest in the shape of the Sawyer family's symbol and immediately tries to save her from Burt Hartman's vendetta. He is caught and beaten brutally by Burt Hartman and Ollie (another one of the men that killed his family). Knowing that Hartman and company will surely kill her to protect their secrets, and traumatized by her experiences thus far, Heather decides that she owes allegiance to Leatherface as her last remaining family, and she saves him by hurling him a chainsaw, which he uses to kill their mutual enemies. Later, they return to the Sawyer home, where Heather reads the letter left by Verna stating the mansion and all the money is hers. Verna warns her about the danger of being a Sawyer and asks her to take care of "Jed" (Leatherface), who will protect her in return.

In a post-credits scene, Heather's abusive adoptive parents, come to the house in an attempt to weasel her inheritance. They wait by the door until Leatherface comes out with his chainsaw to kill them.

==== Vilmer ====
Vilmer, played by Matthew McConaughey, features as a fictional character and main antagonist in the 1994 film Texas Chainsaw Massacre: The Next Generation.

Vilmer is a rage-filled, psychopathic sadist and head of a family of serial killers, which includes two brothers: the excitable Walter and the chainsaw-wielding transvestite Leather (unlike the other films in the franchise, The Next Generation does not call this character "Leatherface"). Vilmer is accompanied by his wife Darla, a woman who, while independently minded, often suffers abuse at his hands. Vilmer and his family live in an old dilapidated farmhouse. Vilmer drives around in an unidentified rural Texas town in his tow truck hunting down fresh victims to bring back to his house. He wears a leg brace due to unspecified injury; according to Walter, he has been shot and run over several times throughout his life. Vilmer primarily uses a Buck knife, but his leg brace itself can also be used as a weapon. Darla claims that Vilmer is part of a longstanding murderous conspiracy, the Illuminati. He is killed by a low-flying airplane while he and Leather chase a would-be victim, heavily implied to have been arranged by the Illuminati.

Vilmer displays characteristics seen elsewhere among the murderous families in the franchise. Like the Hitchhiker in the first film and Chop Top in the second, he practices self mutilation; like Leatherface in the third film, he wears a leg brace, although Vilmer's is a custom-built mechanical leg brace made from a hodgepodge of hoses, metal rods, and electrical devices, controlled by several television remote controls he keeps in his pocket.

==== Walter Edward ====
Walter Edward appeared in Texas Chainsaw Massacre: The Next Generation. He was portrayed by Joe Stevens.

In the 1995 film Texas Chainsaw Massacre: The Next Generation, a character named Walter Edward appears. A relative of the family, Walter, like them, is an agent for a powerful shady government organization who has the family forcibly employed for the purpose of terrorizing society. His fate in the film is left ambiguous, as his head is bashed with a hammer by the increasingly unstable Vilmer, seemingly killing him.

Despite his somewhat stereotypical redneck appearance and general insanity, Walter Edward (who is nicknamed W.E. by Vilmer and Darla) is depicted as being fairly educated and highly cultured, continually quoting famous historical figures and works of literature, even while torturing people. He often bickers with Vilmer's wife Darla, stating that before she entered the family, it was Walter who "put things together", referring to the murders. Walter appears to own a gas station/country store and an old pickup truck. Walter also favors a cattle prod while torturing people, and his brother Leatherface for that matter. During dinner, Walter is seen talking to his mute Grandfather about the decline of family values.

According to the original 1974 film's art director Robert A. Burns on the audio commentary for the special edition DVD, that the gas station/barbeque stand owned by Jim Siedow's character the Old Man, was named "W.E. Slaughter's" by Tobe Hooper and Kim Henkel as a joke.

==== Darla ====
Leatherface's sister-in-law and Vilmer's lover who appears in Texas Chainsaw Massacre: The Next Generation. She routinely suffers abuse and domestic violence at Vilmer's hands. Darla is one of the more sane members of the family. She works as a local real estate agent with her office inside a small trailer near her home and frequently contacts Vilmer and his brother Walter over the telephone to tip them off as well as assist them with tracking down and capturing or killing would-be victims that pass by her office. She appears highly disgruntled under Rothman and Vilmer's control and is hinted at once having a normal life, making references to another husband living elsewhere. She also informs a group of teens (her family would later capture) that she had breast implants. After Walter 'W.E.' comes to her office to assist her in kidnapping a fleeing hostage named Jenny, Darla admits to owning a gun. In the movie, Darla also speculates that her lover Vilmer is from outer space and that either Vilmer or his employers has implanted a device in her head which will kill her. Darla is also the one who explains the family's backstory to their captive Jenny, telling her that the family belong to a secret group, which has been assassinating people for hundreds of years, including John F. Kennedy. She is portrayed by Tonie Perensky.

=== The Hewitt family ===
==== Thomas Brown Hewitt / Leatherface ====
In the remake series, Leatherface is named Thomas and lives with his adoptive family, the murderous Hewitts, he is portrayed by Andrew Bryniarski. In this series his family never refers to him as Leatherface, but by his real name. He is also seen taking off his skin masks, which never happened in the original series. His face is revealed to be disfigured by a facial disease. His remake family, the Hewitts, includes his mother Luda Mae, his uncle Monty, his older brother/"uncle" Sheriff Hoyt, and three other members, whose roles have never been explained, like his apparent sister Henrietta, the Tea Lady, a morbidly obese, older woman obsessed with tea, who lives with Henrietta in a small trailer on the Hewitt property and a possible nephew named Jedidiah, a little boy who does not take part in his family's evil exploits. In this series, Leatherface is more of a sadistic serial killer who wants revenge on teenagers than a childlike man under his family's control, which the original series portrayed him as. Leatherface/Thomas and his family use torture murder and cannibalism as their modus operandi. The Hewitts also live in a different home than the Sawyers, who lived on a farm, whereas the Hewitts live on an old plantation. Also, the young children and babies taken from victims are kept by Henrietta and the Tea Lady, who raise them up as Hewitts. In the comics based on this series by Wildstorm, Leatherface has two more cousins, the demented Ezekial "Zeke" Hewitt and his simple minded, childlike brother Shiloh Hewitt. In The Texas Chainsaw Massacre: The Beginning, Leatherface's first known murder is that of his abusive boss, however this murder is different from others he will later commit, as this murder was a crime of passion, but it is Leatherface's psychotic brother/uncle Sheriff Hoyt who later introduces Leatherface and the rest of his family to the art of murder, which according to the end of The Texas Chainsaw Massacre: The Beginning, claims the lives of thirty-three people. Unlike the first four films he is not shown as a cross dresser.

==== The Butcher ====
An unnamed character (simply called "The Butcher") similar to the Hitchhiker in both mannerisms and appearance appears in the one-shot comic book The Texas Chainsaw Massacre: Cut! by Wildstorm, which takes place in the remake continuity of the films. A member of the Hewitt family and brother to Leatherface and an unnamed, Drayton Sawyer-esque character (simply called "The Cook"), the Hitchhiker look-alike utilizes a sledge hammer and bolt stunner as his weapons. In the comic, the character terrorizes and murders two members of a group of teenagers seeking to make an amateur film about the Hewitt family murders, and near the end of it, aids his siblings in slaughtering the film project's director in a manner similar to livestock.

==== Sheriff Hoyt / Charlie Hewitt Jr. ====
Charles "Charlie" Hewitt Jr., a.k.a. Sheriff Winston Hoyt, appears as Leatherface's foster brother in the 2003 remake of the 1974 film The Texas Chain Saw Massacre and its prequel The Texas Chainsaw Massacre: The Beginning. He is portrayed by Golden Globe nominee Ronald Lee Ermey.

A POW during the Korean War, Charlie Hewitt is forced into cannibalism to survive, as rations are extremely scarce. Each week, someone has to be killed and eaten. Charlie apparently grows to like the taste of human flesh and later introduces the grisly practice to his family, the Hewitts, who also start to like the taste of human meat.

Charlie, armed with a shotgun, shoots and kills the local sheriff, Winston Hoyt, at point-blank range during the sheriff's attempt to apprehend his adopted brother, Thomas, for murdering his boss at the meat factory. Charlie then takes on the identity of the murdered sheriff, who was the last member of law enforcement left in Travis County, as evidenced by his immediate statement: "Shit. I just killed the whole fuckin' sheriff's department." He uses this new identity to lure teenagers off the road where they meet Leatherface and his family to be killed and eaten. As he guides his family's killing spree, Charlie/Hoyt himself becomes a serial killer and begins to use torture murder as he and his family capture victims they have hatred for. Hoyt is arguably one of the driving forces behind Leatherface's cannibalism and murders, assuring Thomas that the butchery of human beings is no different from the slaughterhouse: "Meat is meat, and bone is bone". Later, Hoyt is present during Leatherface's first chainsaw murder, urging him to go forward and cheering him on at the same time. A gruff, perverse, foul-mouthed, mean-spirited bully, who often uses false arrest and police brutality (usually with his police baton) on young adults, whom Hoyt hates and looks at as dope-smoking, hippie protesters, Hoyt not only makes no effort to conceal his contempt for everyone around him, he seems to revel in it. For example, when he is called to investigate the suicide of a young girl in the first film, he leers at the corpse and cracks jokes about his predilection for "copping a feel" on dead female bodies. He is killed in the remake when the only survivor, Erin, runs him over repeatedly in his own police car while escaping from the Hewitts. Hoyt, like the rest of his relatives, has a sick sense of family pride and a strong hatred of outsiders. Apparently, either due to the complicated relationship between Hoyt and Leatherface, or the fact that Hoyt does not accept him as a "true" brother because of them not being biologically related, Hoyt views Leatherface as his nephew rather than his brother. In the Texas Chainsaw Massacre comics, Hoyt refers to himself as "Uncle Charlie" and encourages a young Leatherface's murderous impulses; "Uncle" Charlie even shoots and kills a bully whom Leatherface recently attacked and was skinning/flaying alive, after the bully assaulted Leatherface earlier at a swimming hole. Father Charlie's only criticism being that Thomas needs to "learn how to fix 'em proper", Charlie then takes the body and dumps it in a lake. In the prequel, Hoyt refers to Leatherface as his nephew, as does the real sheriff, though both Hoyt and Leatherface view Luda Mae as their mother, and Monty as their uncle. Also, it is revealed in the deleted and additional scenes with audio commentary on the prequel, that Hoyt was supposed to be the Uncle figure in Leatherface's life. Charlie/Hoyt is apparently named after his father, as his mother Luda Mae refers to him as "Junior", and his father, Charlie Sr., is implied at being a farmer, as Hoyt quotes him as saying that "if you want to be a good farmer, you have to keep your livestock clean, a clean goat is a happy goat".

Hoyt also appears in the Texas Chainsaw Massacre comics and is the main character in the comic "Hoyt by Himself", which reveals more about his time in the war revealing that during a mission he was captured by a man named Sergeant Chow (the main villain of the book). Chow locks Hewitt up in a POW camp and feeds him the remains of several dead prisoners there, causing his addiction to human meat. One day Hewitt kills Chow with the bone of one of the prisoners he ate before using his shotgun to escape the camp, he goes defunct and returns home to the Hewitt house where he convinces his family who are too poor to buy any food to commit to homicidal cannibalism. In Avatar Press' The Texas Chainsaw Massacre comics, set between the events of the first film and The Beginning, Hoyt regularly appeared, most often having unwary travelers venture to the Hewitt home where he and family would butcher them. Hoyt is depicted as exceedingly sadistic in the comics, regularly mocking and torturing victims to the point of mutilating them, justifying his actions under a "they got what they deserved"-esque pretense, as shown when he forces an escaped convict and drug dealer to snort cleaning chemicals. Of note, the Avatar Press comics have Hoyt referred to by the name Junior by his family. In the Wildstorm comics, a character very similar to Hoyt appears; he is named "Hank" and is a murderous slaughterhouse worker. When a cameraman and newswoman came to interview him and other butchers about the murderers, he gave them a graphic tour of the slaughterhouse, showing them various animals being killed and how the meat was rendered. Later, when one of their crew went missing, the two went back inside only for Hank to reappear and attack them. After knocking them both out with a cattle-prod, Hank proceeded to torture and ultimately murder the cameraman in the same exact way that the animals were prepared (by slitting the throat and letting the blood drain, and then tossing him into a vat of scalding hot water before 'rendering' the meat) while the newswoman watched. The newswoman managed to escape, with Hank in hot pursuit. He was stopped dead in his tracks by FBI Agent Baines, the uncle of Pepper (one of Leatherface's victims from the remake film). Believing Hank to be responsible for his niece's death, Baines managed to find a stray chainsaw and engaged the slaughterman in a chainsaw duel. Although Baines was wounded by Hank's weapon, Baines gained the upper hand and managed to dismember and ultimately kill Hank. Although Hank is never identified as Hoyt, he did bear a strong resemblance to the character, leading some to believe that he was in fact the sheriff from the remake films. When artist Wes Craig was asked, he responded by saying while he wouldn't confirm whether or not Hank was Hoyt, that the similarity between the two characters was indeed intentional. "I don't really want to say if that was Hoyt or not, it might have been him, might have been his twin, who knows (okay I know but I'm not telling). But yes it was supposed to look like Hoyt", said Craig.

==== The Cook ====
A character very similar to Drayton Sawyer, in both appearance and mannerisms, appears in the Wildstorm comics continuation of the remake series, though his specialty is not chili, but ribs. He is referred to as The Cook (real name unknown), and is one of the modern members of the Hewitt family. He lives in the Hewitt household in Travis County with Leatherface and an unnamed butcher. As his title suggests, he specializes in food preparation and often attends the annual "Meatfest" event. At Meatfest, the Cook offers guests a sampling of his "Texas beef ribs", which are presumably made from people, not cattle. In the comic "The Texas Chainsaw Massacre: Cut!", which took place in 2007, the Cook met an amateur film maker named Mike who wanted to make a movie based on the famous Hewitt murders of 1973. The Cook invited Mike and his three colleagues to the Hewitt house though they were unaware that he was actually one of the cannibal family members. The Cook's family members, the Butcher and Leatherface killed the four film enthusiasts whereupon they were taken into the family slaughter room. The Cook was last seen attending Meatfest '08, once again serving up his special ribs.

==== Luda Mae Hewitt ====
Luda Mae Hewitt appeared in the 2003 remake and its prequel, The Texas Chainsaw Massacre: The Beginning. She was portrayed by Marietta Marich. She is the head of the Hewitt family and the main antagonist of the remake continuity. Luda Mae Hewitt is the matriarch of the Hewitt family and the mother of Sheriff Hoyt. She found the young baby who would later become Leatherface abandoned in a dumpster, and took him in to raise him as her son, naming him Thomas Brown Hewitt.

Luda Mae runs a local butcher shop in Texas, selling meat from the people her son Hoyt captures and her adoptive son Thomas kills and cuts up, and is the first member of Leatherface's family that the teenaged protagonists meet in the first film. Unlike in the original 1974 film, in which Leatherface's family was somewhat abusive to him, Luda Mae is fiercely protective of him. Part of her hatred towards the teenagers is due to the abuse that her deformed, mute, intellectually disabled son suffered as a child at the hands of bullies. On the commentary for the DVD release the writers revealed a cut plotline that, prior to the prequel's continuity, involved Leatherface's abusive father locking him in a woodshack for three years. Once her husband dies, Luda Mae vows that she had stood by long enough and decides to look after her son and take responsibility for his shortcomings. Though Luda Mae states that she "never had a little girl", she appears very close to the character of Henrietta, leading to the possibility that she is her mother, or at the very least related. She also appears very close to the obese character of the Tea Lady. Like the other members of her clan, Luda Mae has a deranged sense of family pride.

Marich has commented that "Luda Mae is the matriarch of what I like to call the 'killer brood'. I always make up a personal history of characters I play, so I suspect that Luda Mae was a homeless young woman who had to make her own way during the Depression. When she finds Thomas, she takes him home, even though he's disfigured and hideously ugly, and protects him as much as possible from the cruel people he encounters and the world at large. That's her main purpose, and the only reason Luda Mae sticks around". In the prequel, she, with the rest of the Hewitt family, are discovered to be cannibals, something only implied in the first film. Like the mother of real killer Ed Gein (whom Thomas is based on), Luda Mae appears to have religious fanatic beliefs, which are seen when the Hewitts inform a captive that their murders are redemption for the victims' sins, and when Luda Mae demands that Hoyt say grace before every meal. Luda Mae is also seen still wearing her wedding ring.

Luda Mae is a prominent character in Wildstorm Comics's continuation of the movies. With the family exposed after the events of the first film, the comics finds the Hewitt family living in a series of tunnels in the sewers of Travis County. In the comics Luda Mae has become, perhaps in light of Sheriff Hoyt's death, more of a leader figure to the family than she was in the films. She exhibits more depravity as well (at one point snapping a victim's neck to prepare dinner) but still believes what she does is necessary for her family's survival, and that outsiders don't understand what she's been through and have no right to judge her.

Luda Mae also appears in the one-shot The Texas Chainsaw Massacre: About a Boy. Taking place in Leatherface's teenage years, the story has a concerned teacher named Mr. Hanson meeting with Luda Mae. Hanson tells her about evidence of Thomas' various problems, such as disturbing drawings in his notebooks and skins made from animals he has caught and killed himself. Throughout the conversation, Luda Mae remains apathetic, stating that "There's nothing wrong with my boy". When the frustrated teacher threatens to contact the city about Thomas, Luda Mae retaliates, bashing in the teacher's head with a shovel and killing him, once again proclaiming that there was nothing wrong with her son.

==== Henrietta Hewitt ====
The apparent daughter of the Tea Lady, though her exact relationship to the Hewitt Family is unknown. Prior to the events of the 1973 Texas Chainsaw Massacre in the 2003 remake, Henrietta lived in a trailer with her corpulent tea-drinking mother (name unknown) not far from the Hewitt residence. In the 2003 movie Henrietta adopted/stole an infant from a woman who committed suicide, but the child was later rescued by Erin. Henrietta appears as a sickly, homely girl in a dirty house coat and slippers. In the Wildstorm comics, Henrietta along with her mother the Tea Lady, drugged and raped FBI agent Henkel. It was her hope that Henkel would leave her pregnant. Henrietta is present when a grenade explodes in her family's secret hideout. She is not present in the novelization of the 2003 remake, but instead her character has been replaced by the Tea Lady, whose name is revealed to be Henrietta. She is portrayed by Heather Kafka.

==== Monty Hewitt ====
Monty Hewitt is Luda Mae Hewitt's brother and the uncle of Leatherface and Sheriff Hoyt. He is featured in the 2003 remake and its prequel. Monty is portrayed by Terrence Evans in both movies.

Monty Hewitt (also known as Old Monty) appears as a bitter, lecherous old man with two amputated legs, who permanently uses a wheelchair. After Sheriff Hoyt kills a biker's girlfriend, the biker seeks revenge on the Hewitts and attacks Monty by shooting him in the leg with a .357 magnum. As a bit of impromptu "surgery", Hoyt orders Leatherface to remove the wounded leg with his chainsaw. Leatherface accidentally nicks Monty's second leg, so Hoyt tells him to remove that as well to lower the risk of infection, and for "balance". Before his accident, Monty worked as a tow truck driver, which is seen in the prequel.

Old Monty has an unnamed pet dog and is the third member of Leatherface's family to meet the stranded teenagers in the first film who eventually become Leatherface's victims (the first being Luda Mae and the second being Jedidiah Hewitt) and he is the one to first summon the killer by repeatedly tapping his cane against the floor. His exact role in the family is still unclear, with various people on the film speculating that he is either Luda Mae's husband or brother (or both), though Luda Mae and her children act like it is her brother. In The Texas Chainsaw Massacre: The Beginning (2006) Monty shows he has hardly any interest in killing innocent people and also claims he wants nothing to do with it. Yet later on Monty seems to have become a lot more bitter and hateful towards outsiders. It is also implied in the films and comics, that over time Monty became more of a sexual predator/paraphiliac as his family's killing spree began to increase. In the novelization of the 2003 remake, Old Monty is presented as Thomas Hewitt's father and Luda Mae's husband, the nature of his leg injury is also different from the one shown in the 2006 prequel, in the novel, a young Leatherface chops his abusive father's legs off with a cleaver, however it states in the novel that Monty sees his son's actions as the proudest moment of his raising of the boy.

In The Texas Chainsaw Massacre comics by Avatar Press, set between the events of the remake and prequel, Monty appears as a prominent character; the Avatar Press comics depict Monty as somewhat more depraved and vicious then the films, with the 2006 miniseries The Texas Chainsaw Massacre: The Grind having him strangle a girl to death and later attempt to rape the girl's foster sister, who escapes by punching Monty in the head repeatedly after freeing herself from the restraints he has her in.

==== Jedidiah Hewitt ====
The youngest and most sane member of the murderous Hewitt family. Jedidiah is also the grandson of Luda Mae Hewitt and the brother of Leatherface/Thomas Hewitt. He is also Sheriff Hoyt's son. Though he was witness to the atrocities committed by his elder family members, Jedidiah had yet to develop the sense of depraved family pride that governed the actions of his kindred. In the 2003 film Jedidiah helps Erin and Morgan escape the Hewitt's home. His one known act of violence was in the Wildstorm comics, when in defense of his grandmother, Jedidiah stabbed FBI agent Hooper through the chest, then split his head open with a meat cleaver after the agent tried to arrest Luda Mae and the rest of Jedidiah's family. It is stated on the audio commentary for the remake that Jedidiah was supposed to be the child of one of the Hewitts' victims. This may be supported by the fact that he does not appear in the prequel, The Texas Chainsaw Massacre: The Beginning, although this could simply be a result of his age, as he appears quite young even at the time of the first film, and the prequel is set during the Vietnam War. In the novelization of the remake, Leatherface murders his nephew with his chainsaw after Jedidiah helps Erin escape the family. This was omitted from the film since it was considered to be too violent. He is portrayed by David Dorfman.

==== Tea Lady ====
She is Luda Mae's younger sister. Almost nothing is known about her, including her real name. The Tea Lady (so named due to her fondness, and seeming obsession, with tea) is morbidly obese and lived in a trailer with her daughter Henrietta not far from the Hewitt household. In 1973, the Tea Lady had a brief encounter with Erin, which ended with the two women drink spiking the girl with drugged tea. The Tea Lady also has a good relationship with the Hewitts, Henrietta and Luda Mae are very close friends, leading to the possibility that they are related. In the Wildstorm comics, the Tea Lady appears more deranged than she was in the movies. The Wildstorm comics also portray the Tea Lady as having a type of dementia, as she is seemingly unaware of the actions of those around her. Though she bears witness to the Hewitt family's macabre actions, she neither condones nor condemns them. Along with Henrietta, the Tea Lady drugged and raped FBI Agent Henkel. The Tea Lady was also present when a hand grenade belonging to another federal agent named Baines exploded in the Hewitt's secret underground grotto. The Tea Lady was very close to the blast, but it remains unknown whether or not she survived the explosion. In the novelization of the 2003 remake, the Tea Lady is named Henrietta and lives by herself, she is also presented as Leatherface's older sister. She is portrayed by Kathy Lamkin.

==== Shiloh Hewitt ====
Shiloh Hewitt is the brother to Ezekiel "Zeke" Hewitt and a cousin to Leatherface. He appears in the Wildstorm Comics as a distant member of the family. He also appears to be mentally deficient, possibly due to inbreeding. He and his brother try to capture victims with his cousins, and also steal a vehicle that Leatherface hides in. When the FBI infiltrates the Hewitt Family's hideout during dinner, a grenade is thrown. Not realizing the danger the object poses, Shiloh jumps at the explosive mid-air, tearing him to shreds.

==== Zeke Hewitt ====
Ezekiel "Zeke" Hewitt is the brother of Shiloh and a cousin to Leatherface. He appears in the Wildstorm Comics as a distant member of the family. He is smarter than his brother, but still lacks sanity. He is a cannibal and very vicious to the victims of his family. With his brother, Zeke kidnaps several victims and drives a truck that Leatherface hides in. He murders one of the FBI agent, Bond, by hiding in a body bag and tries to kill the others by ordering Leatherface to collapse the tunnels. He is killed in a fight between victim Kim Burns and Leatherface inside the cargo section during a truck ride, when Kim rams Leatherface's chainsaw into the driver's cabin, impaling Zeke.

==== Adam Hewitt ====
Adam is Henrietta's husband and cousin, who is mentioned in the Wildstorm Comic "Raising Cain" as the father of her sons, Cain and Abel Hewitt. He died before the events of the comics, after he and his brothers attacked a family out camping, during which Adam is shot in the eye by the couple's son and blindly stumbled into the campfire, burning to death.

==== Cal Hewitt ====
Cal Hewitt is the uncle to Cain and Abel Hewitt, and a cousin to Leatherface. He is shown in the comic, "Raising Cain", teaching Abel how to hunt and kill humans for their meat. He is shown to be a remorseless sexual predator, even going so far as to rape a victim in front of his nephew. He also appears to Cain Hewitt in multiple hallucinations, trying to remind his nephew of his roots. Cal is fatally shot by Cain upon his return years later.

==== Cain Hewitt ====
The twin brother to Abel Hewitt, Jr. and a nephew/cousin to Leatherface. He appears in the comics "Raising Cain" being the son of Henrietta and Adam Hewitt. In the comics, Henrietta tried to leave the family to give her sons a normal life, but during the escape, she and Cain were swept away by a flash flood. He was discovered by locals and adopted by a normal family who renamed him Cain Warner. However, he retained a mental bond with Abel, witnessing the atrocities committed by him and the other Hewitts. Haunted by this, he grew up to become a police officer and tracked down the Hewitts to their property for answers. In a vigilante campaign, Cain kills Abel, Cal, and a cousin named Earl. As Cain attempts to flee with his nephews, Cain Jr. and Abel Jr., he is caught in a flash flood, just like his mother was before him. This time, Cain Jr. remains with the Hewitts while Abel Jr. and Cain wash ashore on the same riverbank Cain was found on as a child.

==== Abel Hewitt ====
Abel was the twin brother to Cain Hewitt and a nephew/cousin to Leatherface. He appears in the comics "Raising Cain" being the son of Henrietta and Adam Hewitt. In the comics, Henrietta tried to leave the family to give her sons a normal life, but during the escape, she and Cain were swept away by a flash flood and presumed dead. Abel was taught how to become a killer by his uncle Cal Hewitt and retained a mental bond with Cain. Eventually, Abel became just as deranged as the rest of the Hewitts and took over the title of sheriff from his uncle Charlie. He married his sister Connie Jean and had a set of twins with her, whom he named Cain Jr. and Abel Jr. after his lost brother and himself. Upon Cain's return, Abel is excited to see his twin again, going as far as to kill his wife to prove how much their kinship meant to him. Cain, disgusted by his brother's warped mindset, shoots Abel to death when he asked him to rejoin the clan.

==== Clem Hewitt ====
Clem Hewitt is a member of the Hewitt Family and a cousin to Leatherface. He appears in the comics "Raising Cain", as the brother to Adam, Cal and Lyle. He is physically deformed and mute, possibly due to inbreeding. He hunts humans for the family with his brothers.

==== Lyle Hewitt ====
Lyle is a member of the Hewitt Family and a cousin to Leatherface. He appears in the comics "Raising Cain", as the brother to Adam, Cal and Clem. He is the most normal looking of the Hewitts, but also the most gluttonous. He hunts humans for the family with his brothers.

== Other characters ==
=== Protagonists ===
==== Sally Hardesty ====
Main character of the original 1974 film. After driving with her friends and wheelchair-using brother to see if a family grave was tampered with after a series of grave robbings, the young motorists run out of gas by an old farmhouse in rural Texas where they become prey for the cannibalistic Sawyer family. Sally was the only survivor of the original film. The character returned for a cameo in the fourth film where she is seen alive, being wheeled through a hospital on a gurney. However, the credits listed her as "Anonymous". The character's reappearance is often seen as confusing, as it is already established in the third film's intro speech that "she died in a private health care facility in 1977." She is portrayed by Marilyn Burns in both films. The man pushing Sally on her gurney is Paul A. Partain, who played Sally's brother Franklin who was killed in the first film, and whose corpse is shown in the second. Sally, played by Olwen Fouéré (as Marilyn Burns died in 2014) returns in the 2022 film as a Texas Ranger, but is ultimately killed by Leatherface with his chainsaw.

==== Franklin Hardesty ====
After driving with his sister, Sally, and their friends to see if a family funeral plot was tampered with after a series of grave robbings, wheelchair user Franklin and the other motorists run out of gas by an old farmhouse in rural Texas only to become prey for the crazed Sawyer clan. Unlike his sister, the only survivor, Franklin is killed in the first movie. However, his skeleton has been kept by the Sawyer family for 12 years and reappears in the second movie when it is discovered by his uncle, Lieutenant "Lefty" Enright. He is portrayed by Paul A. Partain.

==== Jerry ====
Sally's boyfriend in the 1974 film. He is the owner and driver of the group's van. When he goes into the Sawyer house to look for Kirk and Pam, Jerry finds Pam trapped in a freezer. Leatherface appears and hits Jerry in the head with a hatchet.

==== Kirk ====
Pam's boyfriend and Sally's friend. Kirk and Pam decide to go to a creek Franklin told them about, but it has dried up. Kirk then decides to go into the Sawyer house, thinking that they could give them gas in exchange for a guitar. While in the house, Leatherface bashes his head in with a large hammer.

==== Pam ====
Kirk's girlfriend and Sally's friend. Pam shows an interest in horoscopes, and is somewhat superstitious. Pam and Kirk, after discovering a creek they intended to swim in dried up, discover the Sawyer house. After Kirk goes in and doesn't go out (having been killed by Leatherface with a hammer), Pam ventures in. She discovers furniture made out of skeletons and begins screaming, attracting the attention of Leatherface. Leatherface impales her on a hook and cuts Kirk's corpse to pieces in front of her. Jerry later discovers her locked in a freezer, barely alive; Leatherface kills him and stuffs her back in.

==== Vanita "Stretch" Brock ====
The main character in The Texas Chainsaw Massacre 2, where she appears as a disk jockey at a radio station. The Sawyers intended to kill her, but Leatherface fell in love with her in the process. She escapes the Sawyer family in time for their hide out to explode (thanks to Drayton) which supposedly kills the family. Chop Top follows her and horribly attacks her wielding a straight razor until she grabs a chainsaw and attacks him with it, knocking him over an edge down into the abandoned theme park (where the family lived). In Leatherface: The Texas Chainsaw Massacre III, Vanita makes a cameo appearance as a news reporter, her identity being confirmed in DVD commentary. Actress Caroline Williams mentions on the Texas Chainsaw Massacre 2 audio commentary, that in Leatherface: The Texas Chainsaw Massacre III, Stretch has taken up Lefty's job of tracking down the family in revenge for their crimes. She is portrayed by Caroline Williams in both movies.

==== Lieutenant Boude "Lefty" Enright ====
The righteous and moral male hero of the second film. Lefty is the uncle of Sally and Franklin and appears as an aging former Texas Ranger. He turns vigilante when local law enforcement fail to investigate the Sawyer family. He, in a way, was the one who was responsible for the death of the Sawyers. After he shoved a chainsaw through Leatherface's abdomen, Leatherface accidentally hit Drayton, who was holding a primed grenade. The grenade explodes, apparently killing Lefty and everyone else except Vanita and Chop Top. Although Leatherface appears to have survived as he returns in other films though they are considered either loosely direct or alternate sequels to the first and the second films, as several characters besides Leatherface return in the other sequel films, as noted on the audio commentary for The Texas Chainsaw Massacre 2 & Leatherface: The Texas Chainsaw Massacre III. He is portrayed by Dennis Hopper.

==== L.G. McPeters ====
He is played by Lou Perryman.

==== Michelle ====
The main female protagonist of Leatherface: The Texas Chainsaw Massacre III. College student Michelle, while en route to California with her boyfriend Ryan to return a car to her father in Florida, encounters Leatherface and his deranged family. With help from Benny, Michelle escapes from the family's swamp home, but not before she is tortured by the Sawyer clan, who murders her friend Ryan. She is portrayed by Kate Hodge.

==== Benny ====
An African-American ex-Marine and survivalist, Benny appears in Leatherface: The Texas Chainsaw Massacre III. After his jeep crashes into Michelle and Ryan's car, who were fleeing from Leatherface's family, Benny aids the two in trying to escape, successfully killing several members of the family. He appears very skilled at shooting his assault rifle and hand to hand combat. In the film, Benny, along with Michelle, survives and escapes, though in the alternate ending and Leatherface comics, he is murdered by Leatherface. He is portrayed by Ken Foree.

==== Sara ====
A young girl who appears in Leatherface: The Texas Chainsaw Massacre III. She had been travelling through Texas with her sisters and ended up getting trapped in the Sawyer family's territory after stopping to assist a man that they believed had been run over. Sara's sisters are quickly killed off and she is left alone, and evades the Sawyers but is unable to escape the swamp because they watch the roads. A week later, she meets Benny, and helps him escape from Leatherface, but she herself is killed by Leatherface using his chainsaw and her remains are dumped into a bog. She is portrayed by Toni Hudson.

==== Jennifer ====
The main female protagonist of Texas Chainsaw Massacre: The Next Generation, Jennifer and her friends encounter Leatherface and his family after ending up in a car accident on prom night. Spending the bulk of the film trying to escape from the family, Jennifer is eventually saved by the enigmatic Agent Rothman. The unrated edition DVD of the film reveals somewhat more on Jennifer, showing that she is routinely abused by her stepfather. She is portrayed by Renée Zellweger.

==== Erin ====
Erin was the protagonist, and sole survivor of the remake. She passes through Texas- with four friends- on her way to a Lynyrd Skynyrd concert when she encounters the Hewitt family. She is responsible for chopping off Leatherface's right arm with a meat cleaver and killing Sheriff Hoyt by running him over with his car. The novelization states that her last name is 'Hardesty', a reference to the heroine of the 1974 original. It is revealed in Wildstorm's comic continuation of the 2003 remake, that after Erin escaped the Hewitts, she was placed in a mental hospital by proper authorities. She is portrayed by Jessica Biel.

==== Pepper ====
Pepper is a character from the 2003 remake, and the second to die. She was a hitchhiker who they picked up while passing through El Paso, and she immediately took a liking to Andy. She, Erin, and Morgan are later tormented by Sheriff Hoyt/Charlie Hewitt. When the sheriff forces Morgan to reenact the death of a hitchhiker, pepper pressures Morgan to shoot him, while Erin begs him not to. When Hoyt takes Morgan and the van's key, Erin and Pepper attempt to hot wire it. They successfully do so, but the tire rolls out, and Pepper and Erin are attacked by Leatherface. Pepper gets out of the car and tries to run away, but Leatherface slashes her back and cuts her in half with his chainsaw. She is portrayed by Erica Leerhsen.

==== Morgan ====
Morgan is a character from the 2003 remake, and the fourth and last to die. He, and his friends are passing through Texas on their way to a Lynyrd Skynyrd concert when they encounter the Hewitt family. Erin, and Morgan are tormented by Sheriff Hoyt/ Charlie Hewitt, who forces him to reenact the death of a hitchhiker. He is pressured by Pepper and Erin to shoot the sheriff, but when he pulls the trigger, he realizes the gun was empty, and Sheriff Hoyt drives him to the Hewitt house and brutally beats him along the way. He is later rescued by Erin, and the two hide in a shack pursued by Leatherface. When Leatherface attacks Erin, Morgan attempts to save her, but Leatherface hangs him on a chandelier by his hand cuffs, and slashes his crotch. He is portrayed by Jonathan Tucker.

==== Andy ====
Andy is a character from the 2003 remake and the third to die. He and his friends are passing through Mexico, on their way to a Lynyrd Skynyrd concert, when they pick up a hitchhiker named Pepper, who immediately takes a liking to Andy. While in Texas, Kemper goes missing, and Andy and Erin go to the Hewitt house to search for him. There they are attacked by Leatherface and Erin escapes, however, Andy's leg is cut off and he is brought to the basement and left hanging on a meat hook. He is later found by Erin, and after several unsuccessful attempts to help him, he begs her to stab him to end his suffering; Erin reluctantly complies. He is portrayed by Mike Vogel.

==== Kemper ====
Kemper is a character from the 2003 remake, and the first to die. He and his friends are passing through Texas, on their way to a Lynyrd Skynyrd concert, when they pick up a distraught hitchhiker who commits suicide in their van. Kemper, and his girlfriend Erin, go to the Hewitt's house in search of the Sheriff, although only Erin is allowed inside. When Kemper enters to look for her, Leatherface finds him and kills him with a sledgehammer. Leatherface then cuts off Kemper's face and wears it as a mask. He is portrayed by Eric Balfour.

==== Chrissie ====
Chrissie is the main protagonist of the prequel to the remake. After she and her friends get into an auto accident while on their way to re-enlist in the army for the Vietnam War, they become captives of the Hewitt family. She risks her life many times to save her friends but eventually the Hewitts capture her. She manages to escape from them but unfortunately Leatherface/Thomas kills her in the back seat of a car. Chrissie is the first protagonist/heroine in the TCM movies not to have survived. She is portrayed by Jordana Brewster.

==== Bailey ====
Bailey is a character in the prequel to the 2003 remake. She is revealed as Dean's girlfriend. After meeting Sheriff Hoyt and Leatherface, she tries to escape in a truck. But Leatherface strikes her with a tire iron. She is captured like the others (except Chrissie) and is tied up to a bed. Chrissie finds her and tries to rescue her but is caught by Sheriff Hoyt. Bailey, Chrissie, and Dean appear at the dinner table. Her boyfriend is out cold and her tongue is cut out & Leatherface later slits her throat as Chrissie screams in terror. She is portrayed by Diora Baird.

==== Dean ====
Dean is a character from the prequel. He is the younger brother of Eric and the boyfriend of Bailey. It said on his draft card that he was born on June 22, 1951, in Lubbock, Texas. He and Eric get tied up by Hoyt. Hoyt thinks Eric is Dean, but after seeing his brother in pain, Dean reveals himself and is assaulted by Hoyt. Later, Chrissie finds him outside the Hewitt house. She goes in to rescue Eric and Bailey, even though Dean tells her not to. He is shown out cold at the dinner table and does not witness his girlfriend' violent death. He wakes up and assaults Hoyt the same way he did. He later finds Chrissie in the slaughterhouse and also Leatherface who nearly kills her. He distracts him long enough to save Chrissie, but not long enough to save his own life. He is portrayed by Taylor Handley.

==== Eric ====
Eric is the boyfriend of Chrissie and the brother of Dean. He gets captured by Hoyt and so does his brother. Hoyt believes Eric is Dean and puts a cellophane over his head. Dean then admits that the draft card (in which Hoyt found before capturing them) was his and then shoves up a knife into Eric's mouth making him cough up blood, but it allows him to breathe. He is later captured by Leatherface and is brought into the basement. Leatherface straps him onto a wooden table. He turns his head from left to right repeatedly and then cuts off all of his nerves in his arm. Chrissie then finds Eric and is horrified to see his arm. Eric convinces her to go, but she refuses. Chrissie hears Leatherface coming and hides under the table. Luckily, Leatherface doesn't see her. Leatherface then grabs his chainsaw and deeply impales Eric through his stomach. The chainsaw goes through the table nearly going through Chrissie and Eric's blood splatters all over Chrissie. After killing Eric, Leatherface cuts off his face and wears it as presumably his first ever human mask; this is witnessed by the petrified Chrissie. He is portrayed by Matt Bomer.

==== Holden ====
Holden is a member of a biker gang who appears in The Texas Chainsaw Massacre: The Beginning. Holden, his girlfriend Alex, and the rest of the gang antagonize Chrissie, Eric, Dean, and Bailey on the road. After Alex goes missing (murdered by Hoyt), Holden searches for her and finds Chrissie. A traumatized Chrissie's ramblings lead Holden to believe that Hoyt kidnapped Alex with Chrissie's friends and drives to the Hewitt home, where he shoots Monty in the leg (which causes Monty's legs to be amputated) and holds Hoyt at gunpoint. Leatherface arrives and rescues Hoyt, before killing Holden with a chainsaw. He is played by Lee Tergesen.

==== Alex ====
Alex is a member of a biker gang who appears in The Texas Chainsaw Massacre: The Beginning. Alex, her boyfriend Holden, and the rest of the gang antagonize Chrissie, Eric, Dean, and Bailey on the road, and Alex made a vulgar gesture at Chrissie and Bailey. She later pursued Chrissie and her friends on her bike to rob them. After the jeep crashes, Alex threatened Eric, Dean and Bailey with her shotgun. Moments later, Sheriff Hoyt arrived on the scene and shot Alex dead. Her body was taken to the Hewitt residence and mutilated by Leatherface. She is played by Cyia Batten.

==== Ryan ====
Ryan was Heather Miller's boyfriend in the Texas Chainsaw 3D. He, along with his friends Nikki, Kenny and Darryl, decide to travel to Texas with Heather to collect her inheritance. It is known that Ryan and Nikki are having an affair behind Heather's back, but he is persistent in keeping her away so as not to ruin his relationship with Heather, something he doesn't follow through well. While they think Heather is exploring, Ryan and Nikki have sex in the barn. While trying to escape Leatherface, he slashes a tire to the van and the van flips over, killing Ryan on impact. He is portrayed by Trey Songz.

==== Nikki ====
Nikki was the best friend of Heather and the girlfriend of Kenny. She tags along with Heather, Ryan, Kenny and Darryl to Texas to collect Heather's inheritance. Unknown to both Heather and Kenny, she has been having a sexual affair with Ryan. Though he tries to rebuff her advances, she eventually seduces him into a barn to have sex. Their moment is put to a halt when they hear Heather's screams. The group are soon encountered by Leatherface and attempt to run away with Heather. Nikki is later left for dead at Leatherface's house and put in a freezer. While Officer Marvin is investigating the homestead, Nikki pops out of the freezer (similar to Pam from the original film), which startles Marvin and he shoots her in the head by accident. She is portrayed by Tania Raymonde.

==== Kenny ====
Kenny is the boyfriend of Nikki and the best friend of Ryan. He comes along on the roadtrip with the others to see Heather's new mansion. He is an aspiring cook who is learning to become a chef. While he is making dinner for the others, he finds Leatherface's secret room in the cellar, along with Darryl's belongings. As Kenny investigates the room, Leatherface pops out and chases him upstairs. He begins to slip and Leatherface stabs him in the back with a hook and drags him downstairs. He later hangs Kenny on a hook and Kenny tries to fight back, but Leatherface revs up his chainsaw and cuts Kenny in half. He is portrayed by Keram Malicki-Sanchez.

==== Sheriff Hooper ====
He is played by Thom Barry.

==== Barry Farnsworth ====
He is played by Richard Riehle in Texas Chainsaw 3D and Nathan Cooper in Leatherface.

==== Nurse Elizabeth "Lizzy" White ====
She is played by Vanessa Grasse.

==== Bud ====
He is played by Sam Coleman.

=== Antagonists ===
==== Darryl ====
Darryl is a hitchhiker who gets a ride from Heather and her friends to see her mansion. While the others go get food at a market, Darryl stays behind and begins to loot around the house, stealing jewelry and trying to find Verna Carson's corpse in the cellar. Darryl tries to open the metal door in the cellar, but it is locked, so he walks away and continues to steal more belongings. As Darryl turns around, Leatherface hits him over the head with a sledgehammer and bludgeons him several times. He is portrayed by Shaun Sipos.

==== Burt Hartman ====
Hartman is the main antagonist in Texas Chainsaw 3D, one of the first to not be a member of Leatherface's family. When Leatherface was about to be taken in, Hartman took the law into his own hands and led a lynch mob, seemingly killing all the Sawyers. He and the rest of the mob where hailed as heroes, and Burt becomes the Mayor. Unknown to him, Leatherface survived and fled to his grandmother's house and the baby, Edith, was raised by the Miller family under the name Heather. Decades later, when Heather inherits her grandmother's mansion, Leatherface turns up. It isn't long before word gets out that Leatherface is still alive and Heather is a Sawyer, so Hartman takes his vendetta out on her. He has her abducted and taken to a slaughterhouse, where Leatherface eventually turns up. Heather sides with her cousin and Leatherface personally fights Hartman until he forces him into a meat grinder by severing his hands with the chainsaw. He is portrayed by Paul Rae.

==== Carl Hartman ====
A police officer and the son of Burt Hartman. Carl is first seen flirting with Heather. When Leatherface is chasing Heather through the carnival, Carl manages to stop Leatherface and make him flee. Carl takes Heather to the police station for questioning, but leaves to search for Leatherface. After she is revealed to be a Sawyer, he ties her up in the old slaughterhouse, and Burt orders him to leave. He is portrayed by Scott Eastwood.

==== Hal Hartman ====
A crazed Texas Ranger who seeks vengeance against the Sawyers for killing his daughter and the father of Burt Hartman who appears in Leatherface. Having sent Jedediah Sawyer to a mental institution as revenge, Hartman discover that a group of inmates, including Jedediah, have escaped. Hartman and Deputy Sorells pursue the escaped inmates and kidnapped nurse Lizzie White. After capturing one, Clarice, Hartman executed her. Hartman also shoots Jackson in the face, disfiguring him. Having chased Jackson and Lizzie to the Sawyer home, Hartman reveals Jackson is, in fact, Jedediah. The other Sawyers burst in and capture Hartman, and have Jedediah vivisection Hartman with a chainsaw. He is portrayed by Stephen Dorff.

==== Ike ====
Featured in Leatherface, Ike is an escaped mental patient killed by Bud. He was played by James Bloor.

==== Clarice ====
Featured in Leatherface, like Ike, she was a mental patient but shot and killed by the police. She is played by Jessica Madsen.

==== Agent Rothman ====
A member (or possibly the leader) of a powerful government organization or cult referred to as the "Illuminati". Rothman appears in Texas Chainsaw Massacre: The Next Generation as the evil boss of the Slaughter family. After discovering that Leatherface and his family are "breaking the rules" he has set for them, Rothman decides to shut them down, ordering Vilmer to be assassinated and rescuing Jenny from him. In a brief scene of the film, Rothman is depicted as having intricate patterned carvings and large piercings on his body, which are shown as he torments Jenny while the Slaughter have dinner. He is portrayed by James Gale.

== See also ==
- Lists of horror film characters
