= The Texas Chainsaw Massacre (comics) =

Comic books

The popularity of The Texas Chainsaw Massacre film-series and of its main character, Leatherface, led to the publication of several comic books based on the franchise. In 1991, Northstar Comics released a miniseries titled Leatherface — a loose adaptation of Leatherface: The Texas Chainsaw Massacre III — that ran for four issues. In 1995, Topps Comics released Jason Vs. Leatherface, a three-issue miniseries that had Jason Voorhees of Friday the 13th fame moving in with Leatherface and his cannibalistic family.

After the success of the 2003 remake of The Texas Chainsaw Massacre, New Line Cinema set up a "House of Horror" licensing division which licensed the Texas Chainsaw Massacre franchise to Avatar Press for use in new comic-book stories, the first of which appeared in 2005. In 2006, Avatar Press lost the license to the DC Comics imprint, Wildstorm, which subsequently published new stories based on the franchise.

== Northstar Comics ==
The cover to Leatherface #1.

Writer Mort Castle based the 1991 Leatherface miniseries loosely on Leatherface: The Texas Chainsaw Massacre III film. In his words: "The series was very loosely based on Leatherface: The Texas Chainsaw Massacre III. I worked from the original script by David Schow and the heavily edited theatrical release of director Jeff Burr, but had more or less free rein to write the story the way it should have been told. The first issue sold 30,000 copies". Kirk Jarvinen drew the first issue, and Guy Burwell finished the rest of the series.

The comics, not having the same restrictions from the MPAA, featured much more gore than the finished film. The ending, as well as the fates of several characters, was also changed. The roles of the Sawyer family members and their personal backgrounds are also elaborated on, for instance Mama reveals that Grandpa was adopted into the family, Tinker is revealed to be a former hippy and Tex is seen to be the more sane family member, actually showing some signs of remorse.

After completing Leatherface, Northstar planned to publish other Texas Chainsaw Massacre miniseries and one-shots, which included an adaptation of the original 1974 film (previews of the first two covers of the miniseries were included in Leatherface #4) written by J. J. Birch, Tim Vigil and Val Mayerik; and two original one-shots entitled The Texas Chainsaw Massacre Portfolio (produced by Dave Dorman, J. J. Birch, Vince Locke and Guy Burwell) and Leatherface Special, written by Mike Baron, which would have explored Leatherface's childhood. All of these comic projects were cancelled.

== Topps Comics ==
In 1995, Topps Comics released the three-issue miniseries Jason vs. Leatherface, a non-canonical crossover between the Friday the 13th and Texas Chainsaw Massacre franchises, written by Nancy A. Collins with art by Jeff Butler.

The series premise involves accidentally placing Jason Voorhees, the main antagonist of Friday the 13th, on a train headed for a dumping ground in Mexico when Crystal Lake is drained of radioactive waste by a company. Running amok on the train, Jason kills its crew and causes the vehicle to crash in Texas, where he meets and befriends Leatherface and his inbred family (consisting of Cook, Hitchhiker, Grandpa and several other original relatives, all of them dead). After he lives with the family for a day, relations between them and Jason ultimately sour due to a series of misunderstandings, which result in Leatherface and Jason battling. In the end, the Hitchhiker apparently kills Jason with a sledgehammer and the family dumps him in a nearby lake. But Jason arises several hours later and decides to begin trekking back "home" to Camp Crystal Lake, away from the place that encouraged dangerous things such as friendship.

== Avatar Press ==
The "Terror" variant cover to Texas Chainsaw Massacre: Fearbook.

In 2005, Avatar Press began to release Texas Chainsaw Massacre comics, set in the continuity of the 2003 remake of the original film, but serving as prequels to the film. The comics had a multitude of variant covers, such as "Gore", "Terror" and "Die Cut".

The first comic released, a one-shot entitled The Texas Chainsaw Massacre Special (written by Brian Pulido and drawn by Jacen Burrows), involves three escaped convicts and their two female companions encountering the cannibalistic Hewitt family after a botched robbery of Luda Mae Hewitt's general store. The Hewitts kill all the convicts but keep one of the females, Charity, as she is pregnant. After Charity miscarries she escapes, only to be murdered by Leatherface.

After the release of The Texas Chainsaw Massacre Special, Avatar printed a three-issue miniseries entitled The Texas Chainsaw Massacre: The Grind — written by Brian Pulido with art by Daniel HDR. The miniseries involves a bus full of choir-girls, along with their teachers and the teachers' daughter, becoming stranded in Texas when their bus breaks down near the Hewitt house. When the two teachers leave to seek aid, Leatherface kills them, while Hoyt finds the girls, plants drugs on them, and locks them in the Blair Meat Company where they wait for Leatherface to kill them. The Hewitts kill all the girls apart from one who escapes, only to be arrested and placed in an insane asylum after Hoyt uses a letter (written by her to her abusive father, and in which she professes to having recurring homicidal thoughts) to make it look like she killed her friends.

The final release by Avatar Press, the one-shot The Texas Chainsaw Massacre: Fearbook, had text written by Antony Johnston with art by Daniel HDR and Mauricio Dias. The premise of this one-shot involves a quartet of friends in the midst of a cross-country trip who run afoul of Sheriff Hoyt, who forcibly takes them to the Hewitt house, where Leatherface kills them all except one, a girl named Lucy, whom he knocks unconscious; Leatherface, when Lucy awakens, puts on a mask created from her boyfriend's face and hammers one of his own masks onto her before forcing her to dance with him as she succumbs to her injuries.

== Wildstorm Comics ==
The cover of Texas Chainsaw Massacre #1.

After Avatar lost the rights to Texas Chainsaw Massacre and to New Line Cinema's other horror properties, Wildstorm started an ongoing series written by Dan Abnett and Andy Lanning with art by Wesley Craig, under the direction of editor Ben Abernathy. Once again, this series featured the continuity established in the 2003 remake.

This series, titled The Texas Chainsaw Massacre, ran from January to June 2007 for six issues until Wildstorm canceled its ongoing New Line horror comics in favor of publishing mini-series and specials based on the movie franchises.

Unlike Avatar's, Wildstorm's series contributed to the mythos by picking up one year after the film ended, effectively generating a sequel: Leatherface has one arm, Erin has been placed in a mental institution, the FBI have Sheriff Hoyt's offices under investigation, and an uncle of Pepper (a victim from the film), one of the senior agents on the case, has the Hewitts in his sights. The storyline followed two new sets of characters, along with the Hewitts themselves: the team of FBI agents, led by the vengeful Agent Baines, and a TV news-crew, led by local anchor Kim Burns, eager for a new scoop on the murders in Fuller, Texas. The series also expanded the roles of some of the more minor characters from the films, such as the Tea Lady, Henrietta and Jedidiah. Whereas the films portray these characters as some of the more relatively harmless members of the family, the comics showed them as just as demented and depraved as Leatherface and Hoyt; in one scene, Henrietta and the Tea Lady rape a drugged FBI agent in an attempt to impregnate themselves, and in another Jedidiah kills an FBI agent (who has attempted to arrest his family) with a cleaver to the face. Wildstorm also introduced members of Leatherface's extended family not present in either of the two films: Ezekiel "Zeke" Hewitt and Shiloh Hewitt. During the storyline, the characters discover that the other residents of Fuller know of the Hewitts' activities and are complicit, living under a "code of silence" and not interfering. At one point, Kim Burns escapes the Hewitts' "family dinner" and arrives at a local bar, only to be refused the use of the phone ("we don't want no Hewitt trouble") by the patrons before being dragged out by Leatherface himself. At the conclusion of the storyline, Kim crashes the Hewitts' truck, sending Leatherface careening out the back, and escapes onto the highway and into the night, wielding Leatherface's own chainsaw.

Two months after the cancellation Wildstorm released The Texas Chainsaw Massacre: Cut!, a one-issue special written by Will Pfeifer with art by Stefano Raffaele. This issue takes place thirty-four years after the first film, with a group of film-students seeking to document the Hewitts. One month later, a second special, The Texas Chainsaw Massacre: About a Boy, written by Dan Abnett and Andy Lanning with art by Joel Gomez, would follow. This issue featured a back story on Thomas Hewitt as a child prior to the events of The Beginning. A third one-shot titled "The Texas Chainsaw Massacre: By Himself" reunited writers Abnett and Lanning with artist Wesley Craig and focused on Hoyt's past, in particular expanding on his time as a prisoner of war during the Korean War and perforce taking up cannibalism to survive.

In September 2007 Leatherface appeared alongside Freddy Krueger in the first issue of New Line Cinema's Tales of Horror in a story entitled "The Texas Chainsaw Salesman", written by Christos Gage and Peter Milligan. In late 2008, Wildstorm started a three-issue miniseries, The Texas Chainsaw Massacre: Raising Cain, written by Bruce Jones with art by Chris Gugliotti. The miniseries centers around two members of the Hewitt family, twin brothers separated at birth: Cain and Abel, with Abel raised by the Hewitts and Cain by a normal, loving family.

== See also ==
- List of comics based on films
