= Chop-Top =

Fictional character

- The Texas Chainsaw Massacre character
- Bill Moseley as Chop-Top in The Texas Chainsaw Massacre 2 (1986)
- First appearance: The Texas Chainsaw Massacre 2 (1986)
- Created by: L. M. Kit Carson; Tobe Hooper
- Portrayed by: Bill Moseley

In-universe information
- Full name: Robert Paul Sawyer
- Nicknames: Chop-Top; Bloody Bobby; Platehead
- Occupation: Infantry (formerly); Butcher
- Relatives: Bubba Sawyer / Leatherface (brother); Drayton Sawyer (brother); Nubbins Sawyer (twin brother; deceased)
- Nationality: American
- Classification: Mass murderer
- Primary location: Texas
- Status: Deceased

Robert Sawyer, better known as "Chop-Top", is a fictional character from The Texas Chainsaw Massacre franchise; created by Tobe Hooper and L. M. Kit Carson, Chop-Top makes his first appearance (portrayed by Bill Moseley) in the film The Texas Chainsaw Massacre 2 (1986) as one of the film's villains and the main source of its black humor.

A member of the cannibalistic Sawyer family, Chop-Top, whose actual name is revealed to be Robert (shortened to "Bobby" or "Bloody Bobby") in the planned spin-off All-American Massacre, is a hippie-like antagonist and comedic relief character who makes frequent remarks related to his PTSD flashbacks and napalm from his time as a Vietnam veteran.

Chop-Top adorns himself in a variety of multi-colored and tattered clothing and claims that music is his life.

== Backstory ==
Throughout The Texas Chainsaw Massacre 2, pieces of Chop-Top's past are revealed. The Hitchhiker, Chop-Top's twin brother, states in the first film that their grandfather (Grandpa Sawyer) formerly worked in a slaughterhouse where he was highly esteemed for his ability to manually execute cattle at quick speeds. In the sequel, The Texas Chainsaw Massacre 2, Drayton "The Cook" Sawyer explains that Grandpa Sawyer left the slaughterhouse when it transitioned from manual slaughter to the use of machines like captive bolt pistols. After having quit his job in protest, Grandpa Sawyer and his family fell into poverty. At some point prior to the first film, Grandma Sawyer, Great Grandma Sawyer, and the parents of Drayton, Chop-Top, Bubba (Leatherface), and The Hitchhiker (aka 'Nubbins'), died, leaving Drayton, the eldest son, to serve as head of the family. Having no other skills (save for Drayton's cooking), no money, and no food, the family was reduced to cannibalism. The Sawyer family began killing people for meat to be used in their chili and barbecue, which was sold to the general public at Drayton's Gas Station/Restaurant. However, it is suggested in the first film that Drayton did not kill anyone himself and left it to his three younger brothers while he did all the cooking.

During the events of the first film, Chop-Top was stationed as an infantry soldier in the Vietnam War, where he survived a major head wound from a machete-wielding enemy soldier. A metal plate was grafted onto his skull at a VA hospital, earning him the name Chop-Top (or Plate-Head, as he was originally referred to in the script). At some point in time the plate became exposed. It is implied that this happened because of his habit of heating a wire coat hanger and picking pieces of skin from his scalp to eat, as he is seen doing throughout the film. Once he is released from the VA hospital, Chop-Top rejoins his family, who are on the run from the authorities for the murders they've committed, and purchases an abandoned amusement park located in Dallas called "Texas Battle Land" using money he received from the government after being discharged from the military for his injury. Chop-Top fashions his twin brother Nubbins' corpse into a crude, marionette-like form, which he carries around with him and treats as if it were alive.

== Appearances ==
=== Films ===
In The Texas Chainsaw Massacre 2, Chop-Top first appears with his brother Bubba "Leatherface" Sawyer (Bill Johnson) attacking a pair of drunken motorists named Buzz and Rick on a bridge with their pick-up truck. Chop-Top drives the truck while Leatherface kills the two drivers, (The top of Buzz's head is cut off by Leatherface and Rick is killed in the resulting car crash), not realizing that the events were being recorded by the radio station Rick and Buzz had called into using a mobile phone prior to the attack. When DJ Vanita "Stretch" Brock (Caroline Williams) broadcasts the recording of the attack on the drivers, Chop-Top and Leatherface call Drayton to alert him of the broadcast. Drayton then instructs Chop-Top and Leatherface to break into the radio station and kill the DJ.

Stretch finds Chop-Top waiting on a couch in the station and enjoying some music and wearing a Sonny Bono wig to cover his plate. He talks excitedly with her about how she is his favorite DJ and that he and Leatherface "listen to her every night". After some back-and-forth, Leatherface emerges from a vault to attack Stretch, but mistakenly hits Chop-Top instead. Chop-Top emerges ultimately unharmed, besides a dent in his plate, and the plan to kill Stretch fails as Leatherface becomes infatuated with the DJ He tricks Chop-Top into believing he has killed her when the two leave the station, taking an injured co-worker of Stretch's (who was attacked by Chop-Top with a hammer and thought dead until later on in the film) with them.

When Chop-Top and his other brother Drayton (Jim Siedow) discover that Stretch is still alive after finding her in the family's home in an abandoned amusement park called the Texas Battle Land, the three brothers take her captive and decide to let the decrepit patriarch of the Sawyer family, Grandpa Sawyer (Ken Evert), kill her with help from Chop-Top. Vanita is saved when protagonist Lieutenant "Lefty" Enright Hardesty (uncle to Sally and Franklin from the first film) (Dennis Hopper) bursts on to the scene and engages in a chainsaw duel with Leatherface. The battle between the Sawyers and Lefty reaches a climax when a hand grenade, set off by Drayton, explodes, killing Grandpa, Lefty, Leatherface and Drayton.

Narrowly escaping the grenade explosion, Chop-Top follows Stretch, who had also escaped, to the top of a Matterhorn attraction in the Texas Battle Land, which the Sawyers have turned into a shrine known as "Chainsaw Heaven". Slashing Vanita several times with a straight razor, Chop-Top is knocked off of the Matterhorn when Vanita, stumbling upon the mummified corpse of Great-Grandma Sawyer, tears a chainsaw out of her hands and attacks Chop-Top with it, sending him plummeting into the ruins of Texas Battle Land.

All American Massacre, a currently unreleased film, reveals that Chop-Top survived the fall into Texas Battle Land and was found three years later, arrested, found insane and placed in a mental institution where he had remained for the last 10 years; taking place 13 years after the second film, the film was going to have him being interviewed from his prison cell by a tabloid television journalist, narrated by Chop-Top, All American Massacre was to reveal, via flashbacks, the origin of the Sawyer family's cannibalism and what their real names are. The trailer for the film also indicates that he was in Vietnam for less than a full year as it says that "It's been 25 years since he last saw his twin brother alive" and the second film takes place 13 years after the first totaling 26 years.

=== Literature ===
Though Chop-Top does not appear in the 1991 Leatherface by Northstar Comics, a reference to him is made in the form of his catchphrase "Lick my plate!", which can be seen spray painted on the side of Alfredo Sawyer's Last Chance Gas Station.

Chop-Top was completely disregarded in the 1995 Topps Comics Jason vs. Leatherface comic miniseries, which featured only the members of the Sawyer family from the 1974 film and original relatives (all dead); although elements of him appear to have amalgamated into the Hitchhiker character, who refers to Leatherface as Bubba and utilizes the phrase "Dog will hunt!" several times, much like Chop-Top.

== Concept and creation ==
A character named Platehead appeared in the initial Kim Henkel treatment for the film. The character was later changed to Chop-Top by L. M. Kit Carson when he was hired on to write the feature film script.

Bill Moseley was chosen for the role of Chop-Top after director Tobe Hooper saw a fan film and parody he created, The Texas Chain Saw Manicure, in which Moseley portrayed the Hitchhiker, a favorite character of his and his inspiration when acting as Chop-Top. The documentary In Search of Darkness features an exclusive behind-the-scenes story on how Moseley landed the role of Chop-Top.

== Reception and legacy ==
The critical reception of the film itself was mixed, due to the drastic tonal shift between this installment and the original. Despite the mixed critical reception, the character of Chop-Top and the portrayal by Moseley was welcomed by fans. The film has since become a cult favorite, leading to Chop-Top becoming one of the more recognizable horror antagonists from the 1980s.

Chop-Top has become Moseley's most iconic performance as well as the actor's personal favorite. During the celebration of the film's 31st anniversary, Moseley paid tribute to Chop-Top for kickstarting his career stating, "And finally to Choptop, who's with me every day, and without whom I might just be pumping your gas (at least in Oregon)! Dog will hunt!" When Moseley was asked to return to the Texas Chainsaw franchise, this time portraying Drayton Sawyer in Texas Chainsaw 3D originally portrayed by Jim Siedow, Moseley took the opportunity, but expressed disappointment that Chop-Top would not be returning. Moseley stated "I would love to have done that character [Chop-Top], I came close when I did Texas Chainsaw 3D a couple of years ago. I got the call from the producer of that movie saying we want you to play Drayton Sawyer. And I'm just thinking, 'Well that's like asking Moe to come back and play Curly. Or Curly to come back and play Moe, I guess is more accurate." The character was also almost featured in the 2017 prequel film Leatherface. However the character was replaced with the character of Clarice portrayed by Jessica Madsen, who was intended to be an homage to Chop Top. There are complicated rights issues related to the character which have prevented him from appearing in any further Texas Chainsaw Massacre related projects, including the 2023 video game based on the series, and Moseley has expressed interest in buying the rights himself.

A statuette of Chop-Top has been released by Mezco Toyz; the figure is seven inches tall and has twelve points of articulation, and comes packaged with accessories such as alternate weapons and the puppet corpse. A figure of Chop-Top has also been released by NECA, featuring his iconic coat hanger, hammer, Sonny Bono wig, lighter and razor. A mini-bust of Chop-Top has also been released.

The Primus song "Jerry Was a Race Car Driver" features a sound-sample of Chop-Top, chuckling to himself then remarking: "Dog will hunt!" with the sound of a chainsaw in the background.
