= Paul A. Partain =

American actor (1946–2005)

- Born: Paul Alan Partain; November 22, 1946; Austin, Texas
- Died: January 28, 2005 (aged 58); Austin, Texas
- Occupation: Actor
- Years active: 1972–2003

Paul Alan Partain (November 22, 1946 – January 28, 2005) was an American actor, perhaps best known for his role in the original The Texas Chain Saw Massacre (1974) as the wheelchair-user Franklin Hardesty.

== Life and career ==
Partain was born in Austin, Texas. He served in the United States Navy in the Vietnam War, and on his return to the United States, started working at an electronics manufacturing plant during the day, and at a dinner theater at night. In the fall of 1972, Partain found out he had been laid off from the plant, and while at the theater where he worked, was asked to audition for the part of Willy in the 1974 Sidney Lumet film Lovin' Molly, by the theater director there. Through the help of this director, Partain got the role and his acting career began.

The director got Partain his next movie role as well, by pointing Kim Henkel, the screenwriter and producer of The Texas Chain Saw Massacre, toward Partain. Partain originally read for the part of the hitchhiker, but the film's director, Tobe Hooper, was not impressed. Hooper had Partain read for Franklin and cast him in that part instead.

After appearing in two more films in the 1970s (Race with the Devil as Cal Mather and Rolling Thunder as the brother-in-law), Partain had stopped acting by 1978. Partain started appearing in movies again in the 1990s, starting with a cameo in The Return of the Texas Chainsaw Massacre (1995), the third sequel to the 1974 original. One of his other roles in the 1990s was that of the Militia of Texas Minister in the 1997 movie Burying Lana.

For about 10 years, Partain worked as a Regional Sales Manager for Zenith Electronics Corporation. He was married to Jean E. Partain.

== Death ==
Partain died from cancer on January 28, 2005, in Austin, Texas.

== Filmography ==
Year	Title	Role	Notes
1974	Lovin' Molly	Willy	Uncredited
1974	The Texas Chain Saw Massacre	Franklin Hardesty	
1975	Race with the Devil	Cal Mathers	
1977	Rolling Thunder	Brother-In-Law	
1995	The Return of the Texas Chainsaw Massacre	Hospital Orderly	Uncredited
1997	Burying Lana	Militia of Texas Minister	
2003	The Life of David Gale	Alcoholic	Uncredited; Final film role
