= The Texas Chainsaw Massacre: The Beginning =

2006 film by Jonathan Liebesman

- Theatrical release poster
- Directed by: Jonathan Liebesman
- Screenplay by: Sheldon Turner
- Story by: Sheldon Turner; David J. Schow
- Based on: Characters by: Tobe Hooper; Kim Henkel
- Produced by: Michael Bay; Mike Fleiss; Tobe Hooper; Kim Henkel; Andrew Form; Brad Fuller
- Starring: Jordana Brewster; Taylor Handley; Diora Baird; Matt Bomer; Lee Tergesen; R. Lee Ermey
- Cinematography: Lukas Ettlin
- Edited by: Jonathan Chibnall
- Music by: Steve Jablonsky
- Production companies: Next Entertainment; Platinum Dunes; Vortex/Henkel/Hooper
- Distributed by: New Line Cinema
- Release date: October 6, 2006
- Running time: 91 minutes
- Country: United States
- Language: English
- Budget: $16 million
- Box office: $51.8 million

The Texas Chainsaw Massacre: The Beginning is a 2006 American slasher film serving as a prequel to The Texas Chainsaw Massacre (2003), and the sixth installment in The Texas Chainsaw Massacre franchise. The film was directed by Jonathan Liebesman, and written by Sheldon Turner from a story by Turner and David J. Schow. The film's story takes place four years before its predecessor. It stars Jordana Brewster, Diora Baird, Taylor Handley, Matt Bomer and R. Lee Ermey.

Originally, the film had the subtitle The Origin. New Line Cinema had to pay $3.1 million more than expected in order to keep the rights to the franchise after Dimension Films made a large offer to buy it. Kim Henkel and Tobe Hooper, creators of The Texas Chain Saw Massacre, produced alongside Michael Bay, Mike Fleiss, Andrew Form, and Brad Fuller.

The Beginning was released in North America on October 6, 2006. The film received negative reviews from critics and grossed $51.8 million on a budget of $16 million. The series was rebooted in 2013 with Texas Chainsaw 3D.

== Plot ==
In 1939, a woman dies while giving birth in a slaughterhouse in Texas, and the supervisor abandons the baby in a dumpster. When young Luda Mae Hewitt finds the child, she takes him back to the Hewitt residence, names him Thomas and raises him as her own son.

Thirty years later, in 1969, four years before the events of the first film, Thomas works in the slaughterhouse under the same supervisor who left him in the dumpster. When the plant is shut down by the health department, he refuses to leave until the supervisor makes him. Thomas kills the supervisor with a hammer and finds a chainsaw, which he takes with him. When Sheriff Winston Hoyt attempts to arrest him, Luda Mae's son, Charlie Hewitt, kills Hoyt and assumes his identity.

Meanwhile, brothers Eric and Dean are driving across the country with their girlfriends, Chrissie and Bailey, to enlist in the Vietnam War. At a diner, they run into a biker gang, one of whom follows them on her motorcycle. She draws a shotgun and orders the group to pull over. In the ensuing chaos, the car crashes, and Chrissie is thrown into a field. When Hoyt arrives, he kills the biker and makes them put her body in his car. He then calls for Uncle Monty to tow the jeep, which Chrissie is hiding in.

Hoyt drives the group to the Hewitt house where he has Thomas butcher the biker's body. Chrissie runs to the highway and flags down Holden, the biker's boyfriend, and they return to the house together. Hoyt tortures Dean after finding out that he was going to forgo the Vietnam War draft. When Hoyt leaves, Eric breaks free from his restraints and gets Dean to safety before sneaking into the house to free Bailey. Bailey escapes in Monty's truck but Thomas stabs her with a meat hook and drags her back to the house. Dean gets caught in a bear trap, and Hoyt knocks Eric unconscious.

Holden and Chrissie part ways to search for their friends. While Chrissie finds Dean, Holden takes Hoyt hostage. Thomas straps Eric to a wooden table and slices off the nerves in both of his arms. Hoyt calls out to Thomas for help, and Thomas kills Holden with the chainsaw. Chrissie finds Eric in the basement but is unable to free him, and hides when Thomas returns. Thomas kills Eric with the chainsaw, then skins his face and wears it as a mask. Chrissie is about to flee when she hears Bailey's screams and decides to save her. She finds her upstairs, but Hoyt catches her and brings her downstairs for dinner, along with Bailey and an unconscious Dean. Leatherface slits Bailey's throat and tries to take Chrissie to the basement, but she stabs him in the back with a screwdriver, and jumps out of a window.

Dean regains consciousness and savagely beats Hoyt before heading off to find Chrissie. Chrissie enters the slaughterhouse, grabs a knife and cuts Leatherface's face, but he overpowers her. Dean intervenes but Leatherface kills him with the chainsaw. Chrissie escapes in the slaughterhouse supervisor's car and drives off. She sees a state trooper with a pulled-over pedestrian, but as she pulls over, Leatherface appears in the backseat and fatally impales her with the chainsaw, causing the car to lose control and kill both the trooper and pedestrian. A triumphant Leatherface walks along the road back towards the Hewitt house.

== Cast ==
- R. Lee Ermey as Charlie Hewitt Jr.
- Jordana Brewster as Chrissie
- Taylor Handley as Dean
- Matt Bomer as Eric
- Diora Baird as Bailey
- Lee Tergesen as Holden
- Terrence Evans as Monty
- Marietta Marich as Luda Mae
  - Allison Marich as young Luda Mae
- Kathy Lamkin as Tea Lady
- Tim De Zarn as Supervisor
- Lew Temple as Sheriff Winston Hoyt
- Cyia Batten as Alex
- John Larroquette as Narrator (uncredited)
- Andrew Bryniarski as Thomas Hewitt / Leatherface

== Production ==
=== Development ===
After the success of The Texas Chainsaw Massacre (2003), Platinum Dunes producers Andrew Form and Brad Fuller began brainstorming story ideas for another installment, deciding a prequel would allow for more narrative possibilities. They contacted Scott Kosar, who wrote the 2003 remake, but he was tied up with other projects, so they turned to Sheldon Turner, whom they worked with on The Amityville Horror (2005). The producers asked Turner to answer questions posed by the original Texas Chainsaw Massacre story concerning the Hewitt family.

Director Jonathan Liebesman was not certain about taking on the film until he learned that it was to be a prequel. He proposed not trying to explain too much of the killer's motives, and that "the movie needed to feel like the beginning of hell."

=== Filming ===
Principal photography began in Austin, Texas, at several of the same locations as the 2003 film. Liebesman asked for Lukas Ettlin as cinematographer, who had shot every student film Liebesman made. The filmmakers decided on a desaturated red, white and blue color theme, representing "the decay of the American dream, the family that's gone off the rails." The film was shot in chronological order, and after the depiction of the car crash, Ettlin changed the shutter angle from 180 to 90 degrees for the rest of the shoot to make everything appear more hectic.

== Release and reception ==
=== Box office ===
The Texas Chainsaw Massacre: The Beginning was released on October 6, 2006, in 2,820 theaters, debuting at number 2 at the box office, grossing $18,508,228 on its first weekend. Its second week saw a 59.6% drop in attendance, grossing only $7,485,290 and coming in at number 5 at the box office. During its third week it grossed $3,779,829 and came in at number 10 at the box office. The film dropped out of the top ten and into eighteenth place with $1,269,942. The Texas Chainsaw Massacre: The Beginning would fail to regain a top ten spot at the box office for the remainder of its theatrical run, ending with $51,764,406 in total gross.

=== Home media ===
The Texas Chainsaw Massacre: The Beginning was released on DVD by New Line Home Entertainment on January 16, 2007. This release included both theatrical and unrated versions of the film, as well as a double feature with the first film. EIV would release the film in the UK on February 19 that same year as both a two-disc uncut edition, a single-disc theatrical version, and as a part of the Texas Chainsaw Massacre collection. New Line would re-release the film in 2008 and 2009 before releasing the film on Blu-ray on October 15, 2013. The film had previously been released for the first time on Blu-ray by Ais on July 6, 2010.

=== Critical reception ===
On review aggregator website Rotten Tomatoes, it holds a 17% approval rating based on 87 reviews and an average rating of 3.80/10. The site's consensus states: "The Texas Chainsaw Massacre: The Beginning is full of blood and gore, but not enough scares or a coherent story to make for a successful horror film." Metacritic reports a 30 out of 100 rating, based on 18 critics, indicating "generally unfavorable reviews". Audiences polled by CinemaScore gave the film an average grade of "C+" on an A+ to F scale.

Peter Travers from Rolling Stone awarded the film zero stars, calling it "putridly written, directed and acted", also criticizing the film's "obvious" plot turns. Nathan Lee from The New York Times panned the film as "an invitation to hard-core sadism". In a more positive review, Peter Debruge of Variety thought "Liebesman hews close to the 2003 pic's bile-tinged snuff film aesthetic ... Purists who wondered what had become of the family dinner scene (left out of the remake) should be pleased to find an even creepier version recreated here."

At the 27th Golden Raspberry Awards (2006), the film was nominated for a Worst Prequel or Sequel, but lost to Basic Instinct 2.

== Future ==
In January 2007, Platinum Dunes executives Bradley Fuller and Andrew Form stated that the company would not be producing the third film in the Texas Chainsaw Massacre remake franchise.

In October 2009, it was announced that Twisted Pictures and Lionsgate Films were attempting to purchase the rights to the franchise from New Line Cinema, with Twisted Pictures producing and Lionsgate distributing. According to Variety writer Michael Fleming, the plan was to create a contemporary film in 3-D, with Stephen Susco writing the script. The contract, with rights-holders Bob Kuhn and Kim Henkel, would be for multiple films. A trilogy of films were planned with Susco writing, James Wan directing the first installment, and Hooper helming the second. In May 2011, Lionsgate announced that it would be partnering with Nu Image to produce the new Texas Chainsaw Massacre, and that John Luessenhop would direct the film.

The reboot film, titled Texas Chainsaw 3D, was released on January 4, 2013. It serves as a sequel to the original The Texas Chain Saw Massacre, ignoring the other films in the franchise.
