= Leatherface: The Texas Chainsaw Massacre III =

1990 film by Jeff Burr

- Theatrical release poster
- Directed by: Jeff Burr
- Written by: David J. Schow
- Based on: Characters by: Kim Henkel; Tobe Hooper
- Produced by: Robert Engelman
- Starring: Kate Hodge; Viggo Mortensen; William Butler; Ken Foree; Joe Unger; Tom Everett; Toni Hudson; Miriam Byrd-Nethery; R.A. Mihailoff
- Cinematography: James L. Carter
- Edited by: Brent A. Schoenfeld
- Music by: Jim Manzie; Pat Regan
- Production company: Nicolas Entertainment
- Distributed by: New Line Cinema
- Release date: January 12, 1990
- Running time: 85 minutes
- Country: United States
- Language: English
- Budget: $2.5 million
- Box office: $5.8 million

Leatherface: The Texas Chainsaw Massacre III (Note: Titled onscreen as Leatherface: Texas Chainsaw Massacre III) is a 1990 American slasher film serving as the sequel to The Texas Chainsaw Massacre 2 (1986) and the third installment in The Texas Chainsaw Massacre film series. Directed by Jeff Burr and written by David J. Schow, the film stars Kate Hodge, Viggo Mortensen, William Butler, Ken Foree, Joe Unger, Tom Everett, Toni Hudson, Miriam Byrd-Nethery, and R.A. Mihailoff. The film follows Leatherface and his cannibalistic family stalking a motorist couple in the backroads of Texas.

The film was distributed by New Line Cinema, who bought the rights to the series from the Cannon Group, Inc. after producing The Texas Chainsaw Massacre 2. Initially, the film was given an X rating by the MPAA, which limited the studio's release possibilities. After the studio made cuts, it was re-rated R, and New Line released it in the USA on January 12, 1990. It was refused classification in the UK upon its initial release. It has since been released on home video in both unrated and rated versions, and a cut version was accepted with an 18 certificate in the UK.

The film was both a critical and commercial failure, grossing $5.8 million at the U.S. box office, making it the poorest-performing film in the series until the release of the next film, The Return of the Texas Chainsaw Massacre, in 1995.

== Plot ==
In 1990, 17 years after Leatherface's killing spree in 1973 (Note: As depicted in The Texas Chainsaw Massacre (1974)) and 13 years after the sole survivor Sally Hardesty died in a private health care facility in 1977, Leatherface kills a young woman, Gina, and cuts off her face to make it into a mask while Gina's sister, Sara, watches from a nearby window.

Sometime later, a couple traveling through Texas, Michelle and Ryan, reach the Last Chance Gas Station, where they meet a hitchhiker named Tex and the station's owner Alfredo. A fight soon breaks out between Tex and Alfredo when Tex finds Alfredo spying on Michelle as she uses the station restroom. Alfredo becomes defensive, and as Michelle and Ryan flee in their car, they witness Alfredo apparently killing Tex with a shotgun. When Ryan and Michelle become lost, the driver of a large truck throws a dead coyote at their windshield. As Ryan changes the flat tire on the car, Leatherface appears and ambushes them, but they manage to drive off unscathed.

Afterward, Michelle, Ryan, and another driver, a survivalist named Benny, crash when a bloodied Tex leaps in front of the car. Michelle, Ryan, and Benny decide to find Tex. On the way, Benny discovers a hook-handed man named Tinker, who offers his assistance in setting down road flares. Benny soon realizes Tinker's real intentions after he finds a damaged chainsaw in the back of his truck. He flees and encounters Leatherface but is saved by Sara, who had earlier escaped Leatherface. Benny learns that Sara's entire family was killed and that Leatherface and his family are watching the roads. Benny hears Michelle and Ryan calling for him and leaves Sara; Leatherface kills her with his chainsaw a short time later. Leatherface then attacks Michelle and Ryan, capturing the latter when he gets caught in a bear trap.

Escaping, Michelle locates a house and is captured by Tex, revealed to be one of the Sawyers, who brings her into the kitchen and introduces her to the already deceased and decomposed "Grandpa" as well as Anne and the Little Girl. Tinker then drags in the badly injured Ryan, whom he and Tex suspend upside-down with a pair of meat hooks. When Leatherface returns home, Tex equips him with a large chromed chainsaw with the words "The Saw is Family" engraved on it. In the woods, Benny finds Alfredo and apparently kills him. As the family prepares for dinner in the kitchen, the Little Girl kills Ryan. Leatherface prepares to kill Michelle as well, but Benny opens fire on the house with a semi-automatic rifle, killing Anne and presumably Tinker. Michelle escapes and flees to the woods, pursued by Leatherface, while Benny kills Tex. Benny rushes to Michelle's aid, but Leatherface apparently kills him. In revenge, Michelle apparently kills Leatherface.

As dawn breaks, Michelle reaches the main road, before Alfredo's pickup truck, driven by a surviving Benny, stops in front of her. As Benny helps her into the truck, Alfredo appears and attacks him. Benny avoids Alfredo's attacks, and Michelle kills Alfredo before the pair drives away, unaware that a surviving Leatherface is revving his chainsaw some distance away.

== Cast ==
- Kate Hodge as Michelle
- Viggo Mortensen as Edward "Tex" Sawyer
- William Butler as Ryan
- Ken Foree as Benny
- Joe Unger as Tinker "Tink" Sawyer
- Tom Everett as Alfredo Sawyer
- Toni Hudson as Sara
- Miriam Byrd-Nethery as "Mama" Anne Sawyer
- R. A. Mihailoff as Leatherface
- Jennifer Banko as Little girl
- Beth DePatie as Gina
- Duane Whitaker as Kim
- Caroline Williams as Vanita "Stretch" Brock (uncredited)

== Production ==
After the success of the Nightmare on Elm Street franchise, New Line Cinema bought the rights to The Texas Chainsaw Massacre from the Cannon Group, Inc. with the intention of turning it into a new series. New Line CEO Bob Shaye hoped to move on from the comedic tone of The Texas Chainsaw Massacre 2, return the series to its gritty roots, and cast the title character, Leatherface, as the primary star above his cannibalistic family. The studio fast-tracked development and shot a teaser trailer, supposedly with Kane Hodder as Leatherface, before a director was even hired. Producer Michael De Luca hired novelist David J. Schow, who was reworking the studio's A Nightmare on Elm Street 5: The Dream Child at the time, to pen the script. Tom Savini and Peter Jackson were considered to direct before Jonathan Betuel was eventually hired as director. Betuel departed the project for unstated reasons leading to the studio hiring Stepfather II filmmaker Jeff Burr to direct the film. New Line began scouting locations in July 1989. In a statement, they said they were "going back to hard-core horror". Burr wanted Gunnar Hansen to return to the role of Leatherface but the parties could not come to an agreement on financial remuneration. Burr turned to his colleague R.A. Mihailoff to audition for the role after Hansen was out. Viggo Mortensen was cast by Burr after being impressed with his performance in Prison.

Filming took place in Valencia in late July 1989. The director intended to film on 16 mm in Texas, but set construction had already begun in California prior to Burr signing on. With production going over schedule and over budget, the studio fired Burr 1 week into production, but with no one else to replace him, the studio rehired Burr. During production, a wildfire destroyed several locations and crew members would quit on set. Filming also took place less than 1 mile from Six Flags Magic Mountain, so screaming could be heard during certain scenes in the finished film. The aforementioned Kane Hodder served as stunt coordinator for the film and as a stunt double for Mihailoff.

== Release ==
=== Censorship ===
The film gained some notoriety prior to its release due to a battle between New Line Cinema and the MPAA, which initially rated it an X for its graphic violence. It was the final film to receive this rating before the MPAA replaced X with NC-17. Burr cited as issues involved that the studio was independent, Texas Chainsaw Massacre 2 had been released unrated, and the film's grim tone. The studio eventually relented and trimmed the more graphic elements. Burr said the studio cut the film's negatives to meet the release deadline. The film was rejected by the BBFC upon submission for theatrical release in 1990, and the trimmed version gained an 18 certificate when submitted for video in 2004. A total of 4 minutes and 18 seconds was cut in order to gain MPAA approval.

=== Theatrical release ===
Leatherface: The Texas Chainsaw Massacre III was originally slated for a November 3, 1989, theatrical release, and a comedic teaser trailer made of original footage that directly parodies the lady of the lake scene from Excalibur was released in the summer of 1989. However, the release date was soon pushed to the following year and it opened in 1,107 theaters on January 12, 1990, grossing $2,692,087 in its opening weekend, ranking a low number 11, with an average gross of $2,431 per theater. The film saw a 56.2% drop in its second weekend, grossing $1,442,554 with a total domestic gross of $5,765,562.

=== Home media ===
The film was released on VHS and LaserDisc by RCA/Columbia Pictures Home Video the same year.

In 2003, New Line Home Entertainment released the film on DVD in both R-rated and unrated versions. The DVD's special features include an audio commentary with Jeff Burr, Gregory Nicotero, R.A. Mihailoff, David J. Schow, William Butler, and Mark Odesky, a featurette entitled "The Saw is Family: The Making of Leatherface"; as well as a compilation of unrestored, raw and deleted scenes, along with an explanation from Jeff Burr as to why these scenes did not make the final cut; the original ending of the film was also included on the DVD. The unrated version was released on Blu-ray on February 13, 2018, as part of the Warner Brothers Archive Collection label.

== Reception ==
Leatherface: Texas Chainsaw Massacre III was panned by critics upon its initial release. On the review aggregator website Rotten Tomatoes, 7% of 14 critics' reviews are positive, with an average rating of 3.7/10. Metacritic, which uses a weighted average, assigned the film a score of 30 out of 100, based on 10 critics, indicating "generally unfavorable" reviews.

Richard Harrington of The Washington Post blamed the failure of the film on the edits that were made to get the film an R-rating, stating, "They shot an X film, but edited it down to an R to satisfy the MPAA ratings board. Whether that was just a publicity ploy or not, the lack of hardcore gore in this latest installment is quite noticeable."

Chris Parcillian of Film Threat called it "Just another generic slasher flick with nothing beyond the Leatherface connection to recommend it to discerning fans."

Mark Kermode of Time Out called it "a relentlessly sadistic and worryingly amusing movie, which will entertain and offend in equal measure".

Michael Wilmington of the Los Angeles Times called it "vapid deja vu". Ryan Turek of Shock Till You Drop called the film unremarkable but fondly remembered by horror fans who were starved for theatrical releases.

Bloody Disgusting rated it 4/5 stars and wrote, "As you may have guessed, the movie has its flaws, but besides that I think it’s damn entertaining."

Leonard Maltin gave the film 1/4 stars, noting that cuts had severely damaged its overall coherence.

== Marketing ==
=== Soundtrack ===
Leatherface: Texas Chainsaw Massacre 3 – Original Soundtrack

Soundtrack album
- Released: February 6, 1990
- Genres: Heavy metal; thrash metal
- Length: 46:47
- Label: Restless

Professional ratings
Review scores
Source	Rating
AllMusic	2/5 stars

The film's soundtrack consisted of the following tracks:

No.	Title	Performed by	Length
1.	"Leatherface"	Lȧȧz Rockit	4:10
2.	"Bored"	Death Angel	3:27
3.	"When Words Collide"	Wrath (band)	5:42
4.	"Spark in My Heart"	Hurricane	4:56
5.	"Power"	SGM	4:05
6.	"One Nation"	Sacred Reich	3:20
7.	"Monster Mash" (Bobby "Boris" Pickett cover)	Utter Lunacy	5:31
8.	"The Gift of Death"	Wasted Youth	8:50
9.	"Methods of Madness"	Obsession	3:24
10.	"Psychotic Killing Machine"	MX Machine	3:22

=== Merchandise ===
Mezco Toyz planned to release a Leatherface figure from the film in November 2010, but the release was eventually canceled. NECA debuted an 8-inch retro-style Texas Chainsaw Massacre III Leatherface action figure at Toy Fair 2017, made widely available in September 2017.
