= Tom Everett =

American actor (born 1948)

- Born: October 21, 1948 (age 77); Portland, Oregon, U.S.
- Occupation: Actor
- Years active: 1977–present

Thomas Everett (born October 21, 1948) is an American actor known for his performances in political films such as Air Force One and Thirteen Days.

== Filmography ==
=== Film ===
Year	Film	Role	Notes
1986	Extremities	Officer #2	
1987	The Alamo: 13 Days to Glory	Major Evans	
1987	Death Wish 4: The Crackdown	Max Green	
1987	Prison	Rabbitt	
1988	Messenger of Death	Wiley	
1989	Best of the Best	Coach Don Peterson	
1990	Leatherface: The Texas Chainsaw Massacre III	Alfredo Sawyer	
1990	Die Hard 2	Navigator (Northeast Plane)	
1990	Dances with Wolves	Sergeant Pepper	
1992	Double Jeopardy	Frank Jameson	
1996	My Fellow Americans	Agent Wilkerson	
1997	Air Force One	Jack Doherty	
2000	Thirteen Days	Walter Sheridan	
2001	Pearl Harbor	Secretary of the Navy Frank Knox	
2001	Tremors 3: Back to Perfection	Agent Frank Statler	Uncredited
2002	Crazy as Hell	Mansell	
2002	XXX	Senator Dick Hotchkiss	
2003	The Elizabeth Smart Story	Brian David Mitchell	
2004	The Alamo	Mosley Baker	
2005	The Island	President of the United States; clone	
2007	Intellectual Property	Jenny's dad	
2007	Beautiful Dreamer	Colonel Baynes	
2007	Transformers	Air Force General	
2008	The Curious Case of Benjamin Button	Benjamin (1935–1937)	

=== Television ===
Year	TV series	Role	Notes
1983	Hill Street Blues	Jaeger	Episode: "Nichols from Heaven"
1983	Newhart	Prisoner #1	Episode: "Ricky Nelson, Up Your Nose"
1984	Automan	Stanley	Episode: "Zippers"
1984	Remington Steele	Man at Aquarium	Episode: "Dreams of Steele"
1985	T.J. Hooker	Billy Joe Walker	Episode: "Love Story"
1985	Dynasty	Vincent	Episode: "Sammy Jo"
1985	Hunter	Park Mesher	Episode: "Guilty"
1985	Street Hawk	Drummond	Episode: "Female of the Species"
1985	Our Family Honor	Eddie Branner	2 episodes
1985	Days of Our Lives	Marvin 'Speed' Selejko	Episode: "#1.5120"
1985	Remington Steele	Prancer	Episode: "Dancer, Prancer, Donner and Steele"
1986–1987	Cagney & Lacey	Assistant District Attorney Strickland	2 episodes
1987	Houston Knights	Kunkel	Episode: "Home Is Where the Heart Is"
1988	L.A. Law	Patrick Philips	Episode: "Open Heart Perjury"
1989	Matlock	Joey DeFalco	Episode: "The Starlet"
1989	MacGyver	Frank	Episode: "Easy Target"
1990	Quantum Leap	Deputy Sheriff Hazlitt	Episode: "Freedom - November 22, 1970"
1990	Cheers	Director	Episode: "Veggie-Boyd"
1991	L.A. Law	Patrick Philips	Episode: "Mutinies on the Banzai"
1992	Dangerous Curves	Emerson	Episode: "Old Acquaintance"
1993	Eerie, Indiana	Tod's Dad	Episode: "The Broken Record"
1994	Diagnosis: Murder	Detective Haggard	Episode: "Reunion with Murder"
1994	Picket Fences	John Engrams	4 episodes
1995	Murder, She Wrote	Mr. Vernon / Grant Boswell	Episode: "A Quaking in Aspen"
1995	Space: Above and Beyond	C.P.O. Keats	Episode: "Mutiny"
1995	ER	Mr. Kazlaw	Episode: "The Secret Sharer"
1996	Almost Perfect	Director	Episode: "El Pollo Loco"
1996–1998	Profiler	Mr. Casper, Peter Leshansky	4 episodes
1997	JAG	Houck	Episode: "Against All Enemies"
1998	The Pretender	Grant Roemer	Episode: "Indy Show"
2000	Secret Agent Man	Frank Pierce	Episode: "The Elders"
2000	The District	Agent Vargas	Episode: "The Real Terrorist"
2001	The Beast	Rory Carmichael	Episode: "The Price"
2001	Alias	Agent Paul Kelvin	Episode: "Doppelganger"
2002	CSI: Miami	Ryan Cutler	Episode: "Just One Kiss"
2005	The West Wing	Agent Charles Frost	3 episodes
2006	Ghost Whisperer	Principal Corbett	Episode: "Melinda's First Ghost"
2006	Medium	Sponsor	Episode: "Knowing Her"
2006	Monk	Kenneth Woods	Episode: "Mr. Monk Meets His Dad"
2006	NUMB3RS	Keith Whittaker	Episode: "Brutus"
2007	24	Dr. Hastings	Episode: "Day 6: 5:00 AM - 6:00 AM"
2007	Journeyman	Elliot Langley	5 episodes
2012–2014	Franklin & Bash	Judge Warren Mosley	3 episodes
2014	NCIS	Kirkwood Zaysen	Episode: "Page Not Found"
2015–2016	Criminal Minds	NSA Director Brian Cochan	2 episodes
2020	Helstrom	Archbishop Terrazi	2 episodes
