= Toni Hudson =

American actress (born 1960)

- Occupation: Actress
- Years active: 1982–present

Toni Hudson is an American actress, who has appeared in films and on television. She appeared in the 1985 film Just One of the Guys as Denise.

She has made guest appearances on TV shows like The Greatest American Hero, T.J. Hooker, Knight Rider, The A-Team, and The Love Boat.

== Filmography ==
=== Film ===
Year	Title	Role	Notes
1982	Young Doctors in Love	Bunny	
1983	Cross Creek	Tim's Wife	
1984	Places in the Heart	Ermine	
1985	Prime Risk	Julie Collins	
1985	Just One of the Guys	Denise	
1985	School Spirit	Rita	
1986	Nothing in Common	Receptionist	
1987	Uninvited	Rachel	Video
1990	Leatherface: The Texas Chainsaw Massacre III	Sara	Credited as Tom Hudson
2001	Cahoots		
2002	Out of These Rooms	Julie	
2016	Nessie & Me	Mom	
2019	Angels Never Cry	Counselor	
2020	Charlie's Christmas Wish	Jill Frost	
2022	The Next 24 Hours	Mrs. Denise Johnson	
2023	Assassin's Fury	Agent Crampton	

=== Television ===
Year	Title	Role	Notes
1982	Capitol	Girl in Station	1 episode
1983	The Greatest American Hero	Girl at Video Game	Episode: "Wizards and Warlocks"
1983	T. J. Hooker	Dorothy 'Star' Taylor	Episode: "Sweet Sixteen and Dead"
1985	Knight Rider	Maxine Fleming	Episode: "Knight by a Nose"
1985	The A-Team	Dana Harmon	Episode: "Blood, Sweat, and Cheers"
1985	The Love Boat	Rita	Episode: "Good Time Girls"
2018	Rock Fashion Art	Customer	1 episode
2021	Journey of the Tiger Amulet	Lacey Brooks	
