= Joe Unger =

American actor (born 1949)

- Born: Joseph Unger; May 25, 1949 (age 75); Lake County, Tennessee
- Occupation: Actor
- Years active: 1972–2014

Joseph Unger (born May 25, 1949) is an American actor who has starred in many films and on television. He is best known for his role in Wes Craven's 1984 horror hit film A Nightmare on Elm Street as Sgt. Garcia, and as one of Leatherface's brothers, the hook handed Tinker, who appears in Leatherface: The Texas Chainsaw Massacre III (1990).

== Early life ==
Unger was born and raised in Lake County, Tennessee in the United States of America.

== Career ==
His first feature movie was in the 1978 movie Go Tell the Spartans. His other films include Escape from New York (1981), Mask (1985), Barfly (1987), Road House (1989), he did a voice in the 1990 hit science fiction Total Recall.

Unger has made many guest appearances on TV shows, some of those appearances range from The A-Team, Alice, Airwolf, Cagney & Lacey, The Pretender, and Carnivàle.

Unger provided the voice of "Joe the Vampire Hunter" on the Adult Swim series Mary Shelley's Frankenhole.

== Filmography ==
- 1978 Go Tell the Spartans as Lieutenant Raymound Hamilton
- 1979 Fast Charlie... The Moonbeam Rider as The Bank Teller
- 1981 Escape from New York as Bill Taylor (scenes deleted)
- 1984 National Lampoon's Joy of Sex as Mr. Ranada
- 1984 A Nightmare on Elm Street as Sergeant Garcia
- 1985 Mask as 1st Boyfriend
- 1985 UFOria as Gas Station Attendant
- 1986 The Deliberate Stranger (Direct-to-Television Film) as Unknown
- 1986 Stagecoach (Direct-to-Television Film) as Captain Sickels
- 1987 Barfly as Ben
- 1987 Carly's Web (Direct-to-Television Film) as Unknown
- 1988 Lucky Stiff as Kirby
- 1989 Checking Out as Joe
- 1989 Road House as Karpis
- 1990 Leatherface: The Texas Chainsaw Massacre III as Tinker "Tink" Sawyer
- 1990 Total Recall as Additional Voices (voice)
- 1992 The Bodyguard as Journalist
- 1992 Love Field as The Announcer
- 1994 Pumpkinhead II: Blood Wings (Direct-to-Video Film) as Ernst
- 1995 Night of the Scarecrow as Deputy #2
- 1997 Drive as Waterfront Bartender
- 1997 The Bad Pack as Fight Promoter
- 1997 American Hero as Kipper
- 1998 Spoiler as Clemets
- 1998 Together & Alone as Roscoe
- 1999 Natural Selection as Detective Harry Richards
- 1999 Black and White as Charlie Sanders
- 2000 South of Heaven, West of Hell as Nogales Sanches
- 2000 Stranger than Fiction as Bubba
- 2004 Death and Texas as Prison Guard
- 2005 The Circle as The Motel Owner
- 2006 The Visitation as Matt Kiley
- 2006 Altered as Mr. Towne
- 2007 Cold Ones as Hud
- 2007 Broke Sky as Earl
- 2007 Moving McAllister as Lanky
- 2008 South of Heaven as "Rooster"
- 2009 Sutures as Sheriff Baxter
- 2010 Closed for the Season as The Carny
- 2014 In Your Eyes as Wayne
