= Jim Siedow =

American actor (1920–2003)

- Born: James Nash Siedow; June 12, 1920; Cheyenne, Wyoming, U.S.
- Died: November 20, 2003 (aged 83); Houston, Texas, U.S.
- Occupation: Actor
- Spouse: Ruth Siedow (m. 1946–2003)
- Children: 3

James Nash Siedow (June 12, 1920 – November 20, 2003) was an American actor, best known for his role of Drayton "The Cook" Sawyer in The Texas Chain Saw Massacre and its sequel The Texas Chainsaw Massacre 2.

== Life and career ==
Siedow was born in Cheyenne, Wyoming. He began acting in his high school drama class, and later on, moved to New York City, where he started appearing in theatre productions. During World War II, Siedow served in the U.S. Army Air Forces, and after the war, Siedow moved to Chicago, Illinois and started doing radio work. In September 1946, he met and married an actress named Ruth, his wife up to his death. They had three children.

They moved to Houston, Texas soon after their marriage where Siedow continued acting, creating one of Houston's original local community theatres. He directed Houston's first production of Who's Afraid of Virginia Woolf? by Edward Albee. In 1971, Siedow appeared in his first movie, an obscure one titled The Windsplitter, playing a character named Mr Smith. He followed this with his most famous role as Drayton Sawyer in the cult film The Texas Chain Saw Massacre in 1974.

His other movie roles were as Howard Ives in the TV movie Red Alert in 1977, an unnamed role in the 1980 movie Hotwire, and as Drayton Sawyer, again, in The Texas Chainsaw Massacre 2, the sequel to The Texas Chain Saw Massacre.

== Death ==
Siedow died in Houston from emphysema complications in 2003, at the age of 83.

== Filmography ==
List of Jim Siedow film and television credits
Year	Title	Role	Notes
1971	The Windsplitter	Mr Smith	
1974	The Texas Chain Saw Massacre	Drayton Sawyer, the Cook	
1977	Red Alert	Howard Ives	
1980	Hotwire		
1986	The Texas Chainsaw Massacre 2	Drayton Sawyer, the Cook	
1987	Amazing Stories	Totzke	1 episode
1988	Texas Chainsaw Massacre: A Family Portrait	Himself	Documentary
2000	The American Nightmare	Himself (archive footage)	Documentary
2006	Flesh Wounds: Seven Stories of the Saw	Himself	Video Documentary, (final appearance)
2007	The Fearmakers Collection	Himself	
2012	Moxina	Himself (archive footage)	Short film, as "in memory of"
