= David J. Schow =

American novelist

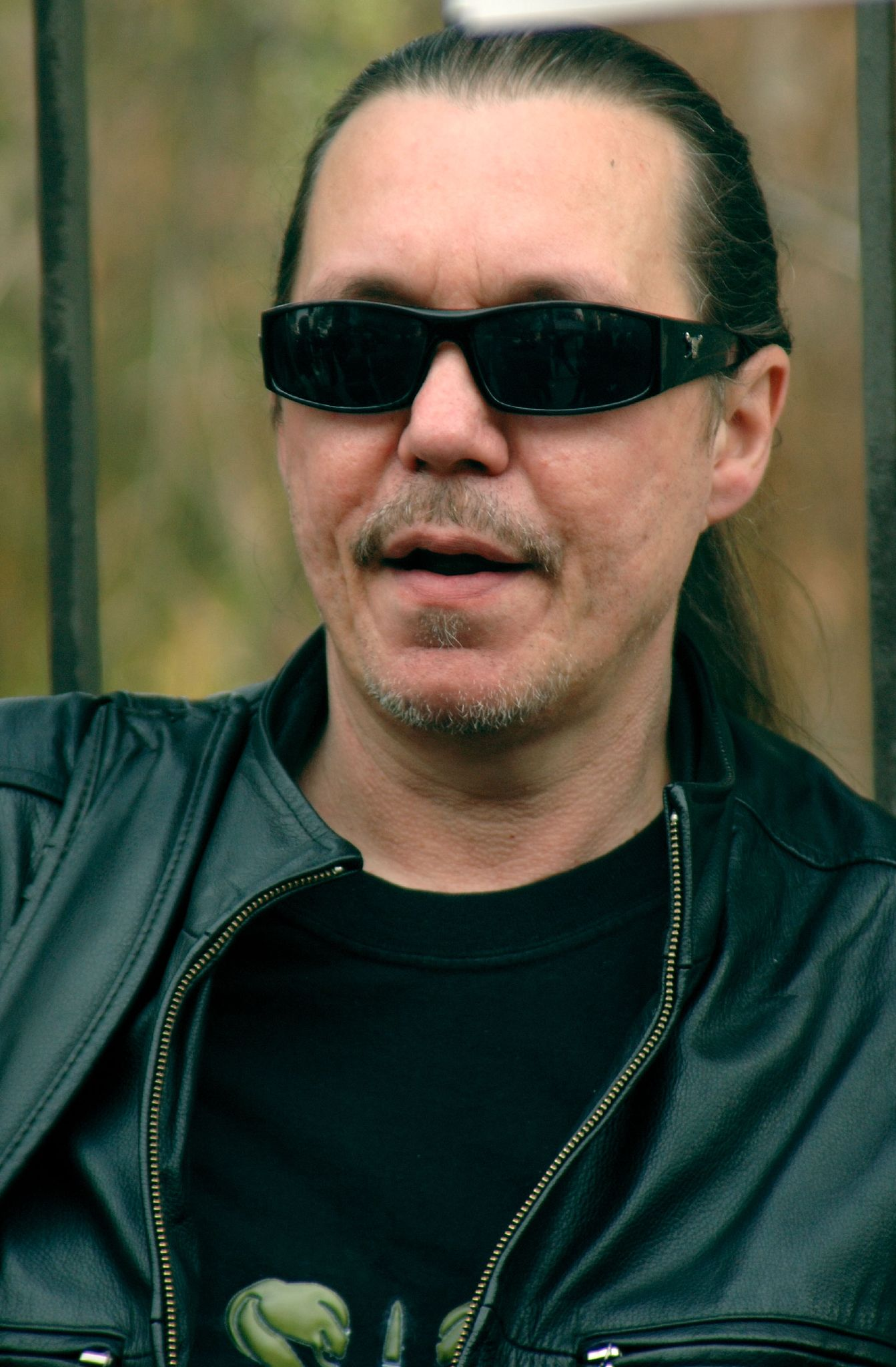
- Schow during the 2007 Writers Guild of America strike
- Born: David James Schow; July 13, 1955 (age 71); Marburg, West Germany
- Occupations: Author; screenwriter; editor
- Writing career
- Pen name: Stephen Grave, Oliver Lowenbruck, Chan McConnell
- Period: 1977–present
- Genres: Horror fiction, splatterpunk

David James Schow (born July 13, 1955) is an American author of horror novels, short stories, and screenplays. His credits include films such as Leatherface: The Texas Chainsaw Massacre III, The Crow and The Hills Run Red. Most of Schow's work falls into the subgenre splatterpunk, a term he is sometimes credited with coining.

== Career ==
In 1987, Schow's novella Pamela's Get was nominated for a Bram Stoker Award for Best Long Fiction. His short story Red Light won the 1987 World Fantasy Award for Short Fiction. During the 1991 World Horror Convention, he served as Master of Ceremonies along with John Skipp, Craig Spector and Richard Christian Matheson.

In the 1990s, Schow wrote Raving & Drooling, a regular column for Fangoria magazine. All 41 installments were collected in the book Wild Hairs (2000), winning the International Horror Guild Award for best non-fiction in 2001. In 2015, The Outer Limits at 50 won the Rondo Award for Book of the Year in a tie with The Creature Chronicles by Tom Weaver, of which Schow was a contributor.

As an editor, Schow's work includes three volumes of writings by Robert Bloch and a book of short stories by John Farris.

Schow has also been a past contributor to liner notes for cult film distributors Grindhouse Releasing/Box Office Spectaculars, notably on the North American DVD release of Italian filmmaker Lucio Fulci's horror film, Cat in the Brain. He has also written text supplements for the DVDs of Reservoir Dogs and From Hell, and has done DVD commentaries for The Dirty Dozen, The Green Mile, Incubus, Thriller and Creature from the Black Lagoon. In 2013, he was interviewed for a documentary film Crystal Lake Memories: The Complete History of Friday the 13th. The 2018 Kino Lorber Blu-ray and DVD editions of both seasons of The Outer Limits feature commentary by Schow on several episodes as well as booklet essays written by him.

== Bibliography ==
=== Novels ===
- The Kill Riff (1988)
- The Shaft (1990)
- Rock Breaks Scissors Cut (2003)
- Bullets of Rain (2003)
- Gun Work (2008)
- Hunt Among the Killers of Men (2010) (under the pseudonym "Gabriel Hunt")
- Internecine (2010)
- Upgunned (2012)
- The Big Crush (2019)

=== Short story collections ===
- Seeing Red (1990)
- Lost Angels (1990)
- Black Leather Required (1994)
- Crypt Orchids (1998)
- Eye (2001)
- Zombie Jam (2005)
- Havoc Swims Jaded (2006)
- A Little Aqua Book of Creature Tails (2014)
- DJSturbia (2016)
- DJStories: The Best of David J. Schow (2018)
- Monster Movies (2020)
- Weird Doom (2021)
- Suite 13 (2024)

=== Non-fiction ===
- The Outer Limits: The Official Companion (1986) (with Jeffrey Frentzen)
- The Outer Limits Companion (1998)
- Wild Hairs (2001)
- The Art of Drew Struzan (2010) (with Drew Struzan)
- The Outer Limits at 50 (2015)
- The Ultimate Outer Limits Companion (forthcoming)

=== As editor ===
- Silver Scream (1988)
- The Lost Bloch Volume 1: The Devil with You (1999)
- The Lost Bloch Volume 2: Hell on Earth (2000)
- The Lost Bloch Volume 3: Crimes and Punishments (2002)
- Elvisland (2003) (by John Farris)

== Screenplays ==
- Freddy's Nightmares — "Safe Sex" (1989)
- A Nightmare on Elm Street 5: The Dream Child (1989) (uncredited)
- Leatherface: The Texas Chainsaw Massacre III (1990)
- Critters 3 (1991)
- Critters 4 (1992)
- The Crow (1994)
- The Outer Limits — "Corner of the Eye" (1995)
- The Outer Limits — "The Voice of Reason" (1995) (excerpts)
- Perversions of Science'' — "The Exile" (1997)
- The Hunger — "Red Light" (1997)
- The Texas Chainsaw Massacre: The Beginning (2006)
- Masters of Horror — "Pick Me Up" (2006)
- Masters of Horror — "We All Scream for Ice Cream" (2007)
- The Hills Run Red (2009)
- Mob City — "His Banana Majesty" (2013)
- Creepshow — "The Finger" (2019)
- Creepshow — "Bunny Didn't Tell Us" (2021) (unaired)
- Creepshow — "Mums" (2021) (with Greg Nicotero) (based on a story by Joe Hill)
- The Crow (2024) (additional literary material)

== Literary Awards ==
Work	Year & Award	Category	Result	Ref.
Pamela's Get	1987 Bram Stoker Award	Long Fiction	Nominated	
Pamela's Get	1988 World Fantasy Award	Short Fiction	Nominated	
Red Light	1987 World Fantasy Award	Short Fiction	Won	
The Kill Riff	1989 Locus Award	Horror Novel	Nominated	
Silver Scream	1989 Locus Award	Anthology	Nominated	
Silver Scream	1989 World Fantasy Award	Anthology	Nominated	
Black Leather Required	1995 Locus Award	Collection	Nominated	
Crypt Orchids	1998 International Horror Guild Award	Collection	Nominated	
Entr'acte	2001 International Horror Guild Award	Short Fiction	Nominated	
Eye	2001 International Horror Guild Award	Collection	Nominated	
Wild Hairs	2001 International Horror Guild Award	Non-Fiction	Won	
Rock Breaks Scissors Cut	2003 International Horror Guild Award	Long Fiction	Nominated	
Obsequy	2006 International Horror Guild Award	Mid-Length Fiction	Nominated	
The Outer Limits at 50 (with Ted C. Rypel)	2014 Rondo Hatton Classic Horror Award	Book of the Year	Won	
	2023 Rondo Hatton Classic Horror Awards	Writer	Won	

== See also ==
- List of horror fiction authors
