= Jason Solowsky =

American music composer (born 1977)

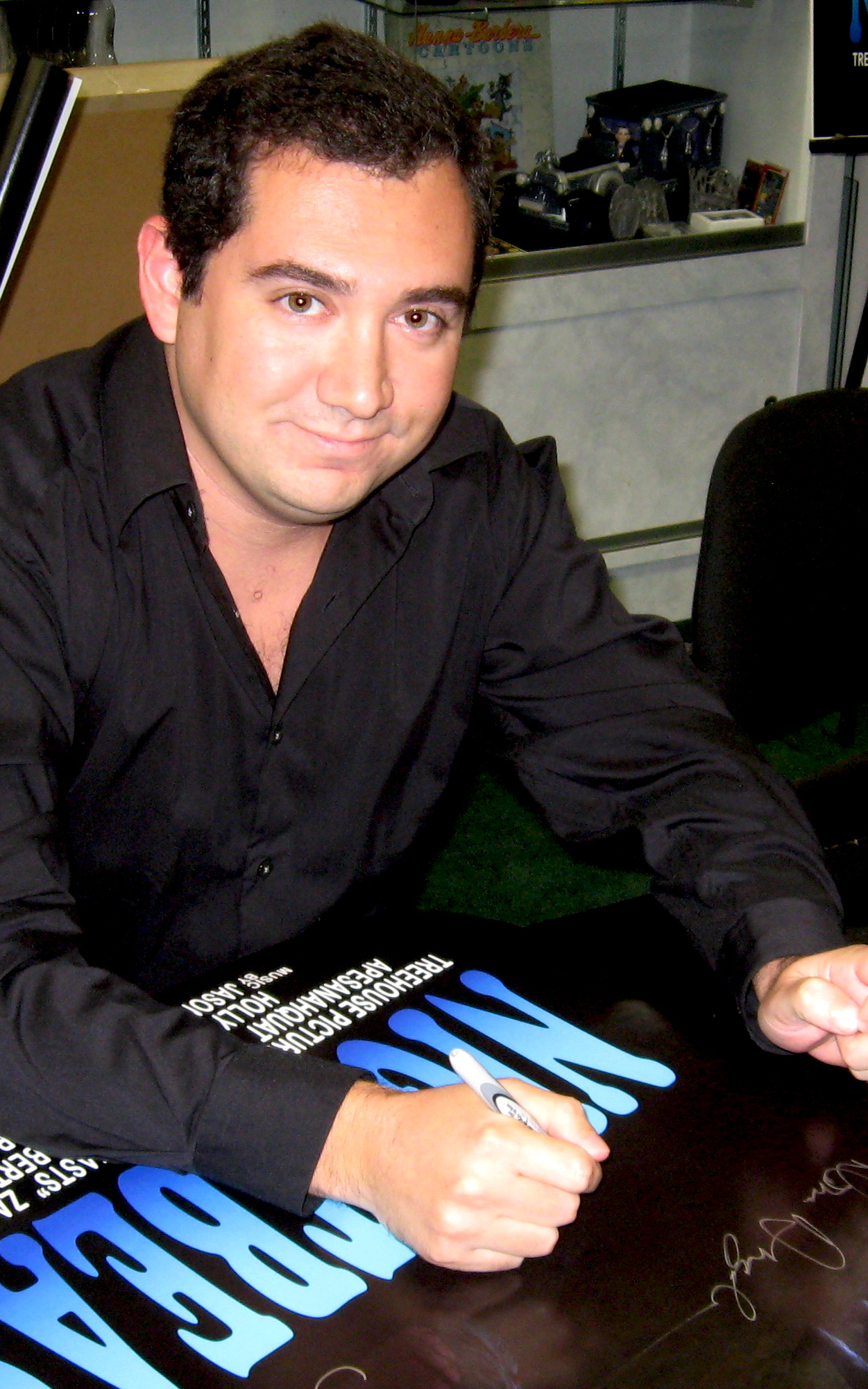
- Solowsky signing posters for the film "Nightbeasts" at Dark Delicacies in Burbank, California

Background information
- Born: Jason Robert Solowsky; November 9, 1977 (age 48); Boston, Massachusetts, U.S.
- Genres: Film score, classical, rock, metal
- Occupations: Composer, guitarist, pianist, music producer
- Instruments: Piano, guitar, keyboards
- Years active: 2002–present
- Website: jasonsolowsky.com

Jason Robert Solowsky (born November 9, 1977) is an American music composer. A classical pianist and guitar player, his compositions can be heard in over 100 films, many of which have been released by Lionsgate, Sony Pictures, and Universal Pictures among others.

== Life and career ==
Born in Boston, Massachusetts, Solowsky graduated from Newton South High School in 1995. He earned his bachelor of music degree from Berklee College of Music in both film scoring and composition. He also graduated from the USC Thornton School of Music, scoring for motion pictures and television program where he studied with composers such as Christopher Young, Elmer Bernstein, David Raksin and Joe Harnell.

Solowsky composed the score for several feature films including, Between Worlds (Nicolas Cage and Franka Potente),The Freemason (Sean Astin and Randy Wayne), Assassin's Game (Tom Sizemore, Bai Ling and Vivica A. Fox), Forgiveness (Richard T. Jones), Falsely Accused (Rosanna Arquette and Jon Gries), Unsullied starring Rusty Joiner, which is directed by former NFL star Simeon Rice, Terror Inside (Corey Feldman and Tanya Memme), American Bandits: Frank and Jesse James (Peter Fonda, George Stults and Jeffrey Combs), Turbulent Skies (Casper Van Dien, Nicole Eggert, Brad Dourif, and Patrick Muldoon), and Templar Nation (Erik Estrada). He also has music featured in the film American Crude (Rob Schneider, Ron Livingston, Michael Clarke Duncan, and Jennifer Esposito). In addition, he scored the film What Up? (Kadeem Hardison, Godfrey), and the film Unemployed (Godfrey).

Solowsky's music was featured in the film, The Dresden Sun starring Christina Ricci, Mena Suvari, Steven Ogg and Linus Roache and the film, A Question of Faith starring Richard T. Jones, C. Thomas Howell, Renee O'Connor, Kim Fields and Gregory Alan Williams.

Other scores by Solowsky include the films Edgar Allan Poe's Annabel Lee, Nightbeasts (Zach Galligan), Cage Free (Dee Wallace), Dust of Life and For Love of Amy (directed by Ted Lange). Solowsky also scored the award-winning film Call To Action (Lily Tomlin).

== Personal life ==
Jason has been married to his wife Nina Solowsky (née Menezes) since 2009.

== Select filmography ==
Year	Film	Starring	Studio/Production Company
2026	The Dresden Sun (additional music)	Christina Ricci, Mena Suvari, Steven Ogg and Linus Roache	Archetype Pictures
2023	Bomb Pizza	Snoop Dogg, Marcus T. Paulk, K. D. Aubert, Vida Guerra	Tubi Films
2020	Scream Test	Glenn Morshower, Darby Hinton, Dave Sheridan (actor), Felissa Rose	Summer Hill Films
2019	The Black Emperor of Broadway	Liza Weil, Nick Moran, John Hensley, Shaun Parkes	Vision Films
2019	Desperate Waters	Matthew Lawrence, Jeffrey Druce, Sarah Scott, Charlene Amoia, Peggy Blow	California Pictures
2018	Between Worlds	Nicolas Cage, Franka Potente, Penelope Mitchell, Garrett Clayton, Lydia Hearst	Lionsgate/Voltage Pictures/Saban Films
2018	Compton's Finest	Vida Guerra, Lavell Crawford, Charles Malik Whitfield, Lawrence Hilton-Jacobs, Cisco Reyes	Stelly Entertainment
2017	A Question of Faith (additional music)	Richard T. Jones, C. Thomas Howell, Renee O'Connor, Kim Fields, Gregory Alan Williams	Universal Pictures Home Entertainment
2017	Murder on the Cape	Jade Harlow, Josh Walther, Heather Egeli	Vision Films
2016	Hauntsville	John Amos, Vida Guerra, Tom Lister Jr., Amy Paffrath, Sofie Norman, Roberto 'Sanz' Sanchez	Powerful Entertainment
2016	Falsely Accused	Rosanna Arquette, Jon Gries, Bradford Anderson, Parker Mack, Emma Holzer	Gravitas Ventures
2016	Foreign Land	Elpidia Carrillo, Jeffrey Licon, Alex Frnka, Peter Holden	Random Media
2015	Tamales and Gumbo	John Amos, Vida Guerra, Tom Lister Jr., Lawrence Hilton-Jacobs, Saafir, Demetrius Navarro, Farrah Franklin	Black Wolf Media Group
2015	Assassin's Game	Tom Sizemore, Vivica A. Fox, Bai Ling, Melissa Mars	Lionsgate
2015	Mercy for Angels	John Amos, Vida Guerra, Emilio Rivera, Lawrence Hilton-Jacobs, Saafir	CARU Pictures
2015	Forgiveness	Richard T. Jones, Robinne Lee, Adam Lazarre-White, Charles Malik Whitfield, Tucker Smallwood	Sony Pictures Home Entertainment
2014	Unsullied	Rusty Joiner, Murray Gray, James Gaudioso - Directed by Simeon Rice	Indican Pictures
2014	Seahorses	Justine Wachsberger, Ian Hutton, Orson Chaplin	Viewfinder Entertainment
2014	Alien Strain	Jason Connery, Laura Gordon, Michael Finn	MTI Home Video
2013	The Freemason	Sean Astin, Randy Wayne, Richard Dutcher, Joseph James	SC Global Media
2013	Templar Nation	Erik Estrada, Richard Dutcher, Joseph James	Maverick Entertainment Group
2013	Unwelcome Strangers	Scott DeFalco, Jonathan Aube	Reality Entertainment/Alchemy Films
2013	Dreams (additional music)	Geoffrey Owens, Lou Myers, Angie Stone, Thomas Mikal Ford, Jazsmin Lewis, Syesha Mercado	Lionsgate
2013	The Wretched Prologue	Ashlynn Yennie, Joey Kern	Rick Nino Films
2012	Death of a Gangster	Molly Schade, Goya Robles	Plus Entertainment (+Entertainment)
2012	New Guy in Town	J.C. Maçek III, Gina DeVettori, Jose Rosete, Jason Farone, Hutchi Hancock	ShortsTV
2012	Driving Me Crazy	Mickey Rooney, Renée Taylor, Celeste Holm, Joseph Bologna	Keith Black Films
2012	Por tú Culpa	Adriana Fonseca, Ismael La Rosa, Luis Fernando Peña, Yeniffer Behrens	Plus Entertainment (+Entertainment)
2012	Call To Action	Lilly Tomlin, Scott Michael Campbell, Hunter G. Williams	Producers Guild of America (PGA)
2012	Off Limits	Vincent Pastore, Joseph D'Onofrio, Sal Fusco	Just Tap It In Productions
2012	The Crying Dead	Chris Hayes, Becka Adams, Hunter G. Williams	Viva Pictures
2011	Dogs Lie	Ewa Da Cruz, Samrat Chakrabarti, Gita Reddy	Vanguard Cinema
2011	Fist 2 Fist	Jino Kang, Bill Duff	Screen Media Ventures
2011	Shooting for Something Else	Jason London, Kevin Farley, Tony Curran, Ryan Merriman	Busted Knuckle Productions
2010	Nightbeasts	Zach Galligan, Robert Miano, Lloyd Kaufman	WonderPhil Productions
2010	American Bandits: Frank and Jesse James	Peter Fonda, Jeffrey Combs, George Stults, Tim Abell	Starz!/Entertainment One
2010	Turbulent Skies	Casper Van Dien, Brad Dourif, Nicole Eggert, Patrick Muldoon	Anchor Bay Entertainment
2010	Cage Free	Dee Wallace, Natalie Burn, Robert Miano	LongTale
2010	Guillotine Guys	Russ Kingston, Mark Wood, J.C. Maçek III	ShortsTV
2009	Annabel Lee	Jon Woodward Kirby, Kristen Hagen	Maria Lydia Pictures
2009	Young American Gangstas	Katt Williams, Lawrence Hilton-Jacobs, Mopreme Shakur, Courtney Richardson II	York International
2009	For Love of Amy	John Beasley, Grace Bydalek, Vincent Lee Alston - Directed by Ted Lange	Vanguard Cinema
2009	Whiskey Neat	Isaac C. Singleton Jr., Antonio Jaramillo	Lane City Films
2009	Laredo	Tamala Jones, Kevin Ryan	KJR Entertainment
2008	Terror Inside	Corey Feldman, Tanya Memme, Susie Feldman	Cinema Epoch
2008	Unemployed	Tom Lister Jr., Farrah Franklin, Godfrey, Lester Speight, James C. Leary, Demetrius Navarro, Sam Sarpong, Mercedes Scelba-Shorte	Lionsgate
2008	What Up? aka The Sweep	Kadeem Hardison, Godfrey, Sam Sarpong	Lionsgate
2008	American Crude (soundtrack - writer/performer: "Swing")	Rob Schneider, Jennifer Esposito, Missi Pyle, Michael Clarke Duncan, Ron Livingston, John C. McGinley - Directed by Craig Sheffer	Sony Pictures Home Entertainment
2007	The Hit	Matt Borlenghi, Christina Ferraro, Matthew McCullough	Rock Point Pictures
2006	Dust of Life	Devon Duy Nguyen, Linh Le, England DuVan	Coco Paris LLC
2006	The Deepening	Gunnar Hansen, Debbie Rochon, Jim O'Rear, Ted Alderman	Under the Bed Films
2006	110%: When Blood, Sweat and Tears Are Not Enough	Thomas Kopache, Bradley Stryker, Jesse Rodriguez	MEB Entertainment
2005	Instant Dads	Dominic Janes, Nina Kaczorowski, Derek Maki, Steve Hasley	Koch Entertainment Distribution
2005	Split Second	Jeff Fahey, Azdine Melliti, Curtis Eames, Said Faraj	Melliti Brothers Productions
2005	That Game of Chess	Alok Nath, Raja Bundela, Viresh Sinha, Cazzy Golomb	Montalvo Media
