= The Return of the Texas Chainsaw Massacre =

1995 film by Kim Henkel

- Theatrical release poster
- Directed by: Kim Henkel
- Written by: Kim Henkel
- Produced by: Robert Kuhn; Kim Henkel
- Starring: Renée Zellweger; Matthew McConaughey; Robert Jacks; Tonie Perenski; Joe Stevens; Lisa Newmyer; Tyler Cone; John Harrison; James Gale
- Cinematography: Levie Isaacks
- Edited by: Sandra Adair
- Music by: Wayne Bell
- Production companies: Ultra Muchos; River City Films
- Distributed by: CFP Distribution
- Release dates: March 12, 1995 (SXSW); September 22, 1995 (United States)
- Running time: 95 minutes (Note: The cut of the film that premiered at South by Southwest in March 1995 had a running time of 102 minutes, per a press release and reviews from Variety magazine. In September 1995, the film was given a limited theatrical release in a cut that ran approximately 95 minutes. After Columbia TriStar Pictures acquired the film, it was re-titled, re-edited, and re-released in its most widely-circulated version as Texas Chainsaw Massacre: The Next Generation, running approximately 87 minutes.)
- Country: United States
- Language: English
- Budget: $600,000–$1 million
- Box office: $185,898

The Return of the Texas Chainsaw Massacre, later released as Texas Chainsaw Massacre: The Next Generation, is a 1995 American black comedy slasher film written, co-produced, and directed by Kim Henkel in his directorial debut, and starring Renée Zellweger, Matthew McConaughey, and Robert Jacks. It is the fourth installment in The Texas Chainsaw Massacre film series. The plot follows four teenagers who encounter Leatherface and his murderous family in backwoods Texas on the night of their prom. It features cameo appearances from Marilyn Burns, Paul A. Partain, and John Dugan, all stars of the original film.

Henkel, who also wrote the screenplay for the 1974 original film, developed The Return of the Texas Chainsaw Massacre with producer Robert Kuhn, intending to create a film closer to the source material, but with exaggerated characters that serve as caricatures of American youth. Henkel's screenplay introduces a subplot involving a secret society that employs Leatherface and his family to torment victims in an effort to invoke a transcendent spiritual experience. Principal photography took place on location in rural areas in Bastrop and Pflugerville, Texas, in 1993, with a largely Austin-based cast and crew.

The Return of the Texas Chainsaw Massacre premiered at South by Southwest on March 12, 1995, and received a limited test market release in the United States by CFP Distribution on September 22. The following year, Columbia TriStar Pictures acquired distribution rights for both theatrical engagements as well as home media. The studio proceeded to re-edit the film and re-title it Texas Chainsaw Massacre: The Next Generation, but its theatrical release remained delayed through early 1997. This resulted in legal disputes between the filmmakers and the studio, with Henkel and Kuhn alleging that Columbia TriStar deliberately withheld the film following the rising successes of its stars, Zellweger and McConaughey.

The revised version of the film was ultimately released (as Texas Chainsaw Massacre: The Next Generation) by CFP Distribution in twenty U.S. cities on August 29, 1997. It was a box-office bomb, grossing $185,898 domestically, and received mixed reviews from critics, with some lauding its dark humor and nightmarish tone, while others criticized the coherence of its screenplay. Columbia TriStar proceeded to handle the film's home video releases in the United States, issuing it on VHS on DVD in 1998 and 1999, respectively. It received a nomination for Best Home Video Release at the 24th Saturn Awards.

Both contemporary and modern critics as well as film scholars have noted the film's prominent elements of parody and recursiveness. In the years since its release, the film has gone on to develop a small cult following. Though a full soundtrack was never released, a companion single featured in the film performed by star Robert Jacks and Debbie Harry was released on compact disc in 1997.

== Plot ==
On May 22, 1994, (Note: In the revised 1997 cut, the date has been changed to May 22, 1996.) 21 years after Leatherface's killing spree in 1973, four teenagers—Barry, Heather, Jenny, and Sean—attend their school's prom in rural Texas. When Heather discovers Barry cheating on her with another girl, she storms out of the dance, followed by Barry, who tries to explain himself as they drive away in his car. Their argument is interrupted by Jenny and Sean, who are hiding in the backseat. Heather takes a detour off the freeway, and while distracted, collides with another motorist, who passes out in the ensuing confusion. Jenny, Heather, and Barry leave Sean to look after the unconscious motorist while they search for help.

They stop at an office trailer, where they meet Darla, an insurance agent, who promises to call her boyfriend, a tow truck driver named Vilmer Slaughter. They leave the office and begin heading back towards the wreck, only for Heather and Barry to become separated from Jenny in the darkness. Vilmer soon shows up at the scene of the wreck, killing the motorist, before chasing Sean in his truck and fatally backing over him repeatedly.

Meanwhile, Heather and Barry discover an old farmhouse in the woods. As Barry looks around, Heather is attacked by Leatherface on the porch swing and subsequently forced into a meat locker inside the house. One of Vilmer and Leatherface's family members, W. E., finds Barry and holds him at gunpoint before forcing him inside. Barry tricks W. E. and locks him out but while using the bathroom, Barry discovers a corpse in the bathtub. Leatherface kills Barry with a sledgehammer before impaling Heather on a meat hook.

Jenny returns to the scene of the wreck, where she is met by Vilmer, who offers her a ride. She accepts, only for Vilmer to threaten her, before showing her the bodies of Sean and the motorist hanging in the truck bed. Jenny jumps out of the truck and runs into the woods. She is attacked by Leatherface, resulting in a chase through the farmhouse, where she finds several preserved corpses in an upstairs bedroom. After leaping through an upstairs window, Jenny manages to flee the property. She seeks refuge with Darla, who reveals herself to be in league with the killers when W. E. shows up and beats her with an electric cattle prod. The two put Jenny in Darla's trunk and she leaves to pick up dinner.

After being tormented by Vilmer, Jenny escapes the house, attempting to drive off in Darla's car. She is stopped by Vilmer, who knocks her unconscious. Jenny awakens at the dinner table, surrounded by the family, who reveal they are employed by a secret society to terrorize people that may cross their path. A man named Rothman arrives unexpectedly, reprimanding Vilmer for his methods, before revealing an array of scarifications and piercings on his torso and licking Jenny’s face. After Rothman leaves, Vilmer flies into a rage, slashing himself with a razor and killing Heather by crushing her skull under his mechanical leg, before knocking W. E. unconscious with a hammer.

Vilmer and Leatherface prepare to kill Jenny, who breaks free and, using a remote control to manipulate Vilmer's leg, escapes. Jenny reaches a dirt road, where she is rescued by an elderly couple in an RV. However, Leatherface and Vilmer run them off the road, resulting in the RV falling on its side. Jenny emerges from the vehicle unscathed and continues running, with Leatherface and Vilmer in hot pursuit. A cropduster appears and swoops down on Vilmer, killing him when one of the wheels grazes his skull. Leatherface screams in anguish, while Jenny looks on. A limousine arrives and Jenny jumps in the backseat, where she is met by Rothman, who explains her experience was supposed to be spiritual and Vilmer had to be stopped. He offers to take her to safety before dropping her off at a hospital, where she speaks to an officer. A blonde woman, being pushed by on a gurney, meets Jenny's gaze. Back on the dirt road, Leatherface continues to flail his chainsaw in despair.

== Cast ==
- Renée Zellweger as Jenny
- Matthew McConaughey as Vilmer Slaughter
- Robert Jacks as Leatherface
- Tonie Perensky as Darla Slaughter
- Lisa Newmyer as Heather Hutchins
- Joe Stevens as Walter Edward "W. E." Slaughter
- John Harrison as Sean Kingsley
- Tyler Cone as Barry Rodchester
- James Gale as Agent Rothman
- Debra Marshall as Cop In Bud's Pizza
- Susan Loughran as Jenny's Mother
- David Laurence as Jenny's Stepfather
- John Dugan as Cop At Hospital
- Paul A. Partain as Hospital Orderly
- Marilyn Burns as Patient On Gurney (credited as "Anonymous")

== Production ==
=== Development ===
Henkel and producer Robert Kuhn optioned the project through Chuck Grigson, a trustee for the copyright owners of The Texas Chain Saw Massacre, and established their own independent production companies, Ultra Muchos and River City Films, to produce it. Henkel was initially reluctant to direct the film, commenting that, despite being comfortable working with the cast, "all the action and that stuff was something I didn't feel particularly good about... Bob Kuhn bullied me into doing it, to tell you the truth—particularly the directing." On developing the film, Kuhn stated:

I wanted to go back to the original, and [Kim] did, too. We agreed on that right off. And the first major thing was getting him to write the script. I raised the money to get it written, and for us to start trying to put this thing together. Then we went out to the American Film Market in LA and talked to a bunch of people about financing. At that point I'd raised some money, but not nearly enough to make the film, and we looked at the possibilities of making a deal with a distributor... Kim would say, 'Hey, so-and-so is interested, and it might be a deal we can live with.' So we'd talk to 'em and I'd ask three or four hard questions, and I'd just kind of look over at Kim and he'd say 'Yeah.' Then I'd go back and start trying to raise some more money.

In a 1996 documentary on the making of the film, Henkel stated that he wrote the characters as exaggerated "cartoonish" caricatures of quintessential American youth. Henkel cited the murder cases of serial killers Ed Gein and Elmer Wayne Henley as influences on his involvement in both The Return of the Texas Chainsaw Massacre and the original The Texas Chain Saw Massacre. Henkel also deliberately wrote themes of female empowerment into the script, specifically in the Jenny character, whose narrative arc begins with her turbulent home life and, through her endurance of further abuse at the hands of Leatherface and his family, emerges in the end as a "self-realized" individual. "It's her story. It's about her transformation, her refusal to shut up, to be silenced, to be victimized," said Henkel. "And by extension her refusal to be oppressed. Even by culture... Bringing Jenny into a world in which the culture was grotesquely exaggerated was a way of bringing her to see her own world more clearly—that is to say, my intent was to present a nightmarish version of Jenny's world in the form of the Chainsaw family in order to enlarge her view of her own world."

The character of Darla was loosely based on Karla Faye Tucker, a woman sentenced to death for murdering two people with a pickaxe during a 1983 burglary in Houston.

=== Casting ===
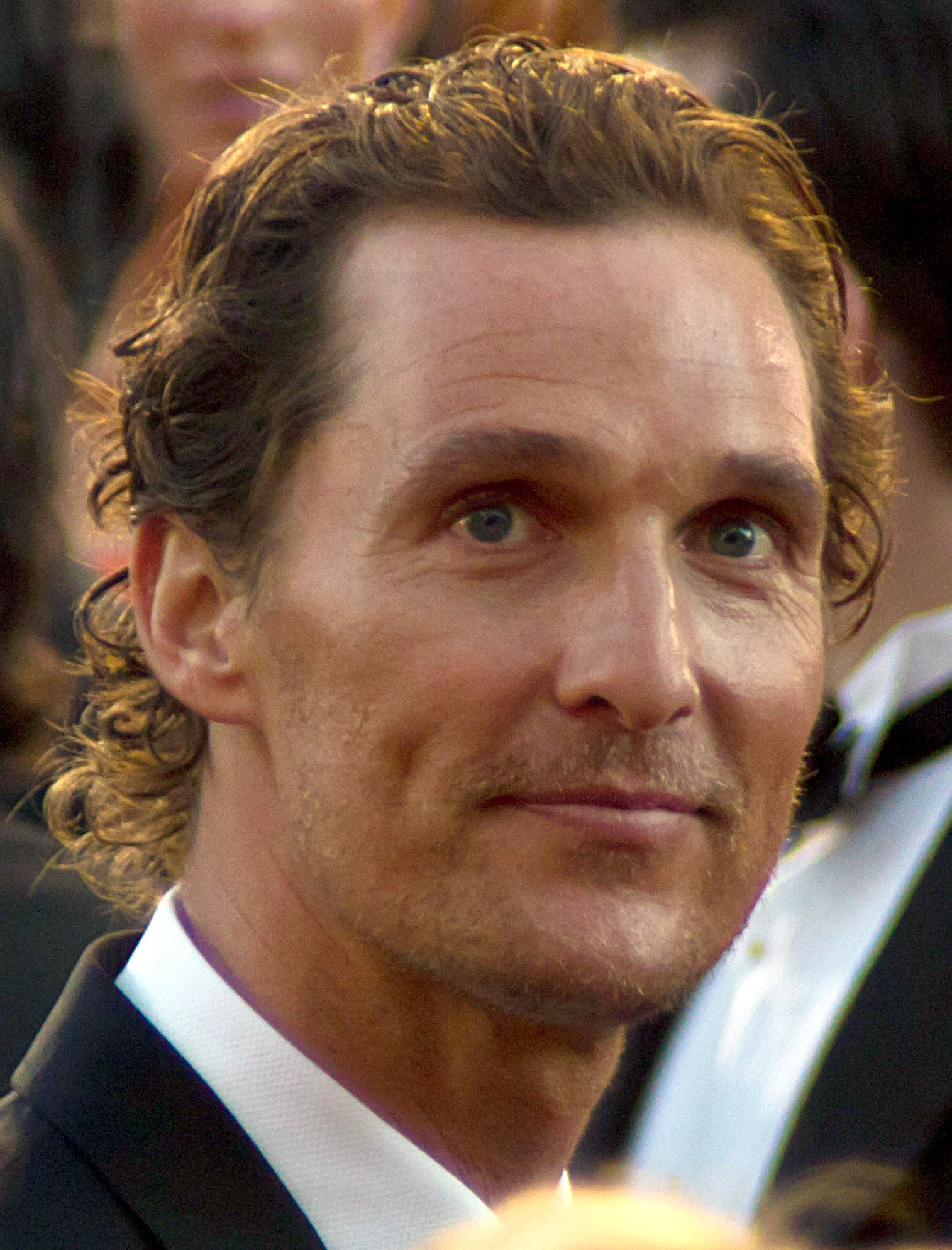
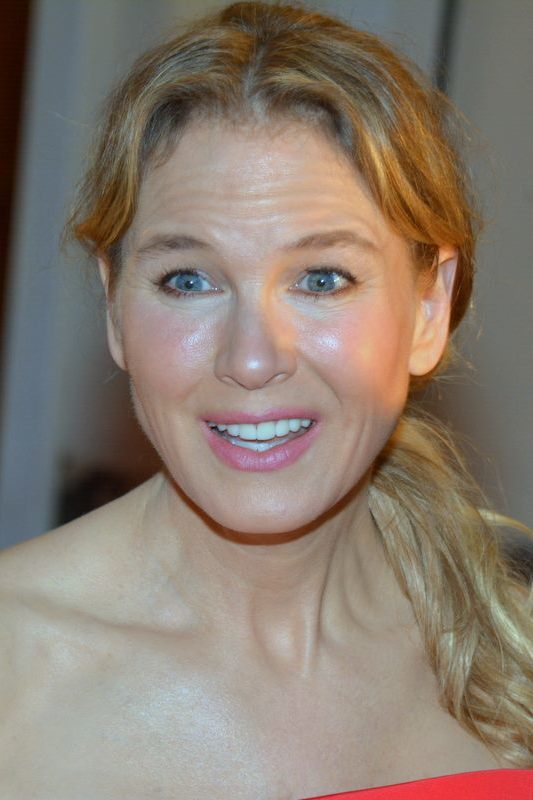
The film marked the first major screen roles of Texas-born actors Matthew McConaughey and Renée Zellweger (pictured in 2011 and 2016, respectively)

Renée Zellweger, a then-unknown Austin-based actress and recent college graduate, was cast in the lead role of Jenny. According to Henkel, Zellweger was the first choice for the role: "From the moment she read for the part, I didn't even consider anyone else." Commenting on the part, Zellweger said, "It's kind of a dark film. You have to take yourself to places you wouldn't like emotionally." Jody Haselbarth served as Zellweger's stunt double in the film, and performed several stunt sequences, including one in which her character leaps through a second-story window and climbs atop a roof antenna.

Henkel cast Matthew McConaughey, another then-unknown Austin actor, as Vilmer. At the time of auditioning for the film, McConaughey had recently completed filming Richard Linklater's film Dazed and Confused (1993). McConaughey initially auditioned for a minor role in the film before deciding to re-audition for the role of Vilmer. Henkel's production casting secretary read lines with McConaughey during his audition, and was so frightened by him that Henkel felt compelled to cast him. "I ran to the kitchen... grabbed a big tablespoon, came back in and just pinned her in a corner and acted like it was a weapon,” McConaughey recounted. "I did it until she cried. And Kim was like, ‘That was good,’ and she was like, ‘Yeah, that was really good. You really scared me.'" Henkel recalled having a "visceral sense of danger in the room" during McConaughey's audition.

Robert Jacks, a local radio host and singer, was cast in the role of Leatherface. Tyler Cone was cast in the role of Barry at the recommendation of special effects designer J. M. Logan, of whom Cone was a close friend, while Lisa Marie Newmyer was cast in the supporting role of Heather. Tonie Perenski was cast by Henkel as Darla; Perensky had been a local stage actress and acting teacher in the Austin area. The majority of the supporting cast and crew were locals from the Austin area, aside from James Gale, a British stage actor hired out of Houston to portray Rothman. Prior to Gale's casting, Lou Perryman had been cast in the role, but had to drop out due to his membership in the Screen Actors Guild (SAG), as the film was a non-SAG production.

The film features cameo appearances from three actors who starred in the original film: Marilyn Burns, who portrayed Sally Hardesty, appears as a patient on a gurney in the film's final sequence, though she receives an anonymous credit; Paul A. Partain, who portrayed Franklin Hardesty, appears as a hospital orderly; and John Dugan, who portrayed Grandpa, plays a police officer interviewing Jenny. Henkel invited the three actors to appear in the film, though Burns was credited as "anonymous" due to her membership with SAG.

=== Filming ===
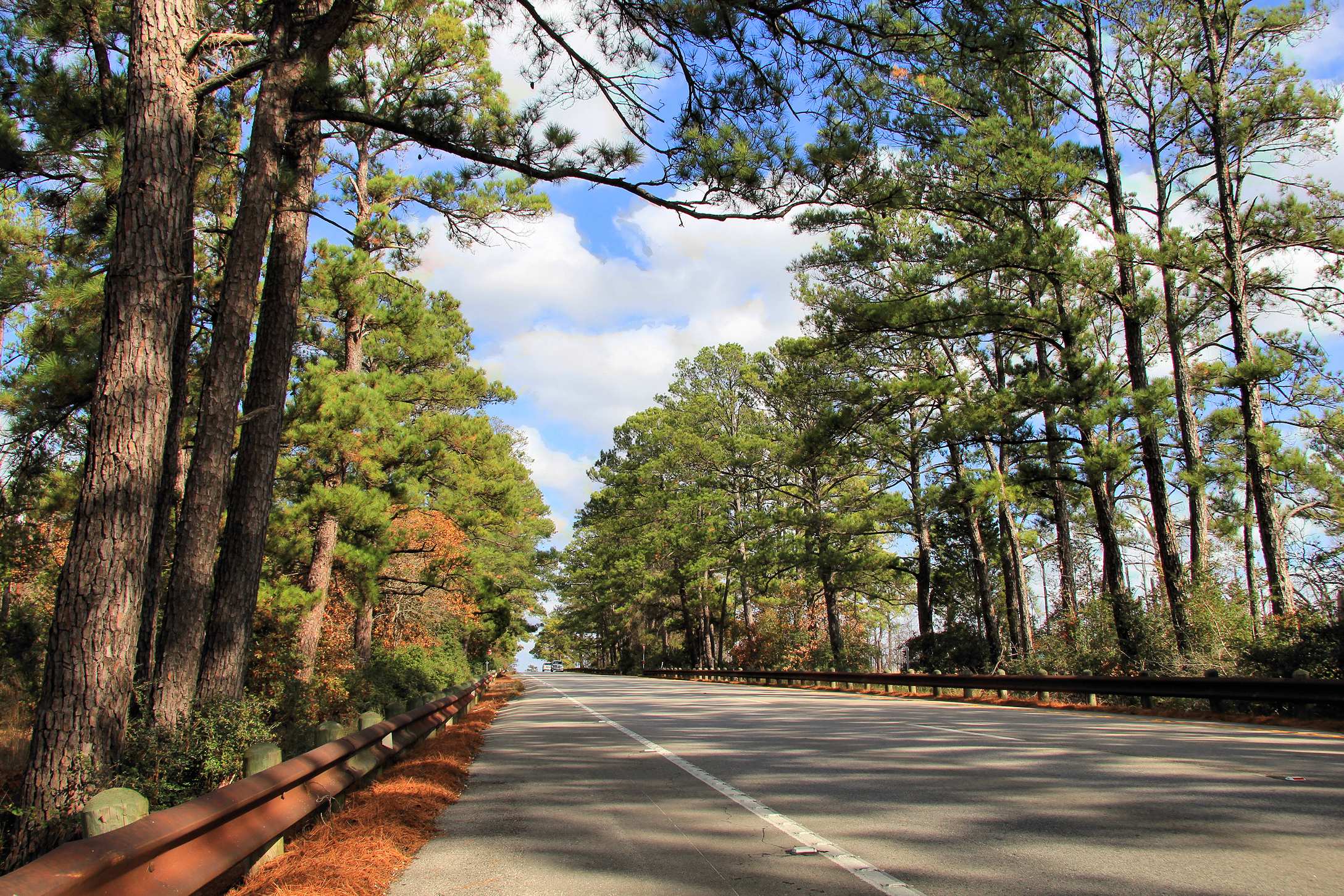
Portions of the film were shot near the Lost Pines Forest near Bastrop, Texas

The Return of the Texas Chainsaw Massacre was shot over a period of six weeks in the late summer of 1993, on a budget of approximately $600,000 (equivalent to $1,337,249 in 2025). (Note: Several sources state the film's budget was $600,000 though a 1997 article indicates its final cost was "about $1 million.") At the time of its production, the film had the working title The Taxidermist: Texas Chainsaw Massacre 4. Principal photography took place on location at an abandoned farmhouse in Pflugerville, Texas, and nearby Bastrop, beginning in August. The farmhouse had previously been used as a filming location for the films Red Headed Stranger (1986) and Flesh and Bone (1993). The high school scenes in the film's opening and hospital interiors in its conclusion were filmed at Pflugerville High School. The film was shot in mostly chronological order.

Production designer Deborah Pastor acquired set dressings for the empty home by visiting local antique stores and a taxidermy shop, the latter of which donated leftover bones from animal carcasses that could be used to adorn the residence. Pastor was also able to acquire a prop chair crafted with bones that had been used in the original 1974 film; like in the original, the chair was used during the dinner sequence for the Grandpa character.

The film was shot by cinematographer Levie Isaacks, a college classmate of Henkel who at the time was working on the horror series Tales from the Crypt. The majority of filming took place at night, and the shoot was described by makeup artist J. M. Logan as "very, very rough for everyone." According to cinematographer Levie Issacks, despite mostly filming at night, the humidity and heat made working conditions uncomfortable. Numerous cast and crew members were affected by poison ivy while filming outdoor sequences on a ranch near the Lost Pines Forest.

Zellweger reflected on the film in a 2016 interview, saying, "It was very low-budget, so we all shared a tiny Winnebago that the producer of the film—it belonged to him, it was his personal camper. So, you know, makeup was in the front seats and there was a table in the middle for hair, and there was a tiny little curtain by the bathroom. That was where you put your prom dress and your flower on... It was ridiculous. How we pulled that off, I have no idea. I'm sure none of it was legal. Anything we did was a little bit dangerous. But what an experience. It was kamikaze filmmaking."

== Music ==
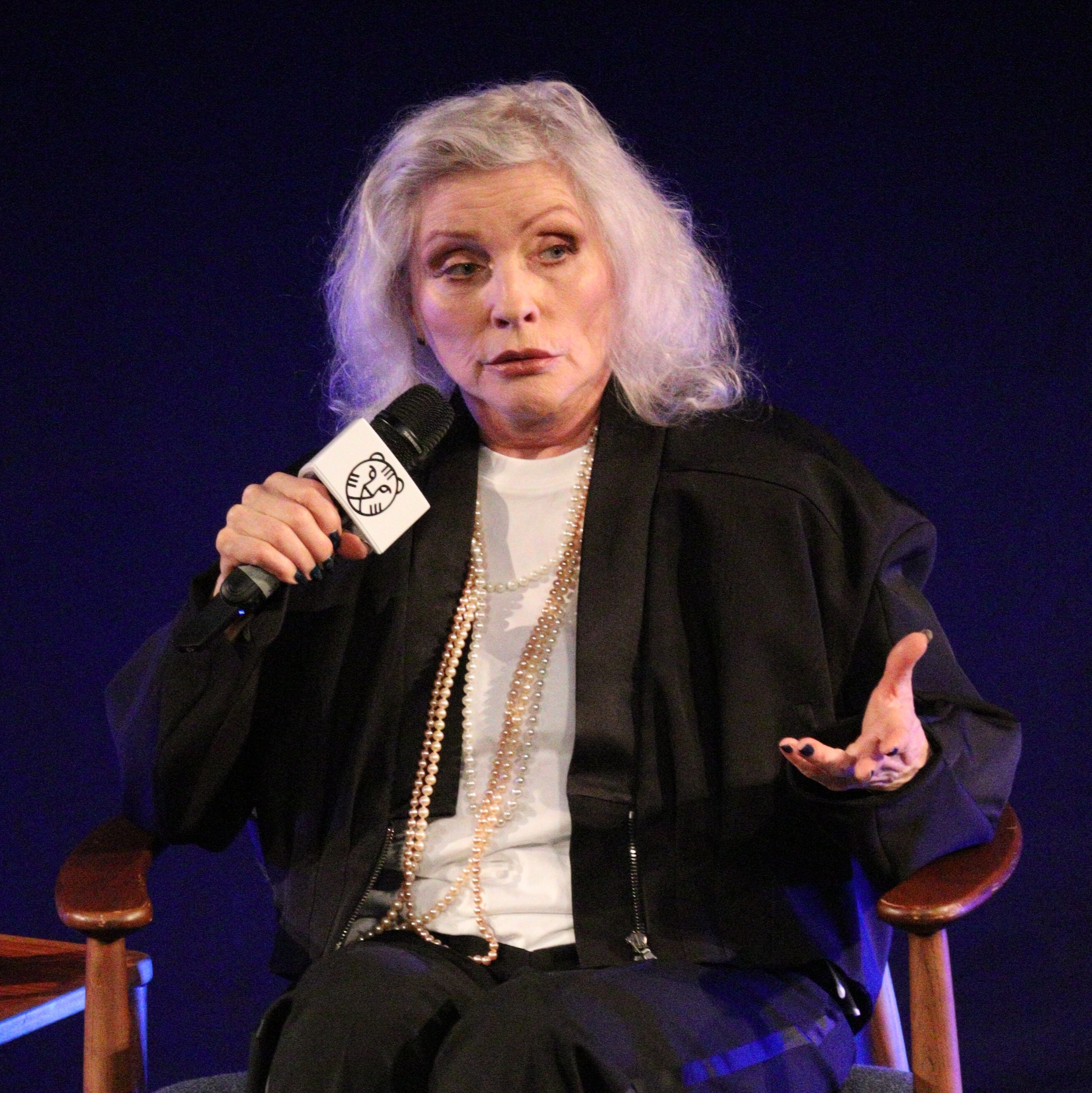
Debbie Harry (pictured in 2024) recorded a song for the film with its star, Robert Jacks

The original score for the film was composed by Wayne Bell, a sound designer on the original 1974 film, though much of his work ultimately went unused, and was replaced with rock songs by local Texas bands. Bell characterized his work on the film as "pretty crappy—there are a few cues that I am proud of." The opening title theme features no electronic instruments, though some of the music featured in the film contains use of synthesizers. The songs featured in the film were almost all by local Austin-based bands and musicians.

The film's soundtrack never received an official release, but Jacks, a friend of Blondie's Debbie Harry, produced a song with Harry titled Der Einziger Weg (sic; English: The Only Way; the correct German title would be "Der einzige Weg"), a single written for and featured in the film. The song was released by Eco-Disaster Music in 1997 as a single on compact disc, featuring Debbie Harry on the cover with a portrait of Jacks as Leatherface, featured in his three costumes, on the wall behind her.

Songs featured in the film: (Note: Adapted from the film's closing credits.)

- "Two-Headed Dog (Red Temple Prayer)" by Roky Erickson
- "I Got It Made" by Skatenigs
- "Blue Moon At Dawn" by The Coffee Sergeants
- "The Wolf at Night" by Erik Hokkanen
- "Der Einziger Weg" by Debbie Harry and Robert Jacks
- "Aphrodite" by Cecilia Saint
- "Mother" by Pushmonkey
- "Torn and Tied" by Pariah
- "Mumbo Jumbo" by The Tail Gators
- "Tornado Warning" by Erik Hokkanen
- "Bodcaw" by Blind Willie's Johnson
- "Ruby" by Loose Diamonds
- "Love to Turn You On" by Pariah
- "Careless Soul" by Daniel Johnston
- "Milky Way Jive" by Erik Hokkanen
- “Brown Skin Woman" by Beau Jocque & the Zydeco Hi-Rollers
- "Voodoo Kiss" by The Naughty Ones
- "Penitentes" by Russ C. Smith

== Release ==
=== Marketing ===
To market the film, the filmmakers launched a website in 1995, selling merchandise including t-shirts, posters, and official scripts signed by Henkel. (Note: The film's original one-sheet from 1995 bears an official website URL in the bottom right corner. The website featured various merchandise to promote the film, ranging from scripts to t-shirts, posters, and other memorabilia.)

=== Initial screenings ===
The Return of the Texas Chainsaw Massacre had its world premiere on March 12, 1995, at the Paramount Theatre as part of the South by Southwest Film and Media Conference, where it received "glowing reviews". A press review for Variety covering the premiere indicated that the cut screened at South by Southwest ran 102 minutes in length. It was shown again at the USA Film Festival in Dallas, Texas the following month, on April 22, and at the Boston Film Festival on September 18.

CFP Distribution gave the film a limited test market release on September 22, 1995 in 27 U.S. theaters, including in Atlanta, Georgia; Orlando, Florida; Madison, Wisconsin; and Portland, Oregon. This cut of the film ran approximately 95 minutes. It was screened locally in Austin at the Dobie Theatre beginning on October 27.

=== Re-release and legal disputes ===
In October 1995, Columbia TriStar Pictures acquired home video distribution rights to the film at a cost of $1.3 million. As part of their acquisition, the studio also agreed to give the film a wide theatrical release, with 1,000 prints to be made and no less than $500,000 invested in marketing and advertising. In early 1996, Columbia TriStar exhibited trailers for the film advertising it as a coming attraction. The release was intended to occur in July 1996, but was postponed to January 1997.

In early 1997, after Columbia TriStar failed to meet the January 1997 release date, Charles Grigson, trustee for the rights holders of the original The Texas Chain Saw Massacre, sued producer Robert Kuhn and Henkel. In his lawsuit, Grigson alleged they had failed to follow through with the promised wide theatrical release, thus preventing the original film's rights holders from receiving the payout for their agreed percentage of revenue. In March 1997, Kuhn contacted the Columbia TriStar's lawyers, who responded that the studio still planned to release the film per the terms of their contract.

Official logo for the film under its revised title, as devised by Columbia TriStar

Columbia TriStar proceeded to change the film's title to Texas Chainsaw Massacre: The Next Generation and re-edit it, excising a total of seven minutes from the previously released version. A significant sequence in which Jenny is abused by her stepfather in the film's opening scene was eliminated in the edit, and the original title card dating the events of the film on May 22, 1994 was updated to May 22, 1996. Numerous other minor changes were made in the editing process, mainly consisting of slight trims and re-ordering of scenes. Despite Columbia TriStar's editorial involvement, it was reported by Variety in August 1997 that Texas Chainsaw Massacre: The Next Generation would be distributed again by CFP Distribution under their newly formed Avalanche Films banner. CFP released the film over Labor Day weekend in 23 theaters across 20 U.S. cities on August 29, 1997, in what Henkel referred to as a "token release." It was subsequently released in several Canadian provinces through the fall of 1997.

Following the film's second release, Grigson voluntarily dismissed his original lawsuit after Columbia TriStar sought to enforce the distribution agreement's arbitration clause. In late 1997, Grigson, now joined by Ultra Muchos and River City Films, filed an action in state court against McConaughey, as well as his management company, Creative Artists Agency (CAA). In the lawsuit, the plaintiffs alleged that McConaughey and CAA had interfered with Columbia TriStar's distribution agreement by pressuring the studio to limit its release. In a 1996 interview, McConaughey denied that he ever wished to conceal his work in the film, commenting, "I'm not embarrassed by it at all. It was fun and honest work at a time when I was trying to figure out how feature films are made and how different directors deal constructively with actors. It was back when we were working 15 hours a day for $300 a week, and I wouldn't trade for the experience."

Kuhn further stated that he felt Columbia TriStar had deliberately delayed the film's wide release to await the premiere of Zellweger's new film, Jerry Maguire (1996). Zellweger responded to Kuhn's statements in May 1997, stating that it "hurt [her] feelings" and added: "I don't have the power to do something like that, even if I wanted to... I kind of liked the movie. It was a great experience."

=== Home media ===
In late 1995, The Return of the Texas Chainsaw Massacre had its first home media release on LaserDisc in Japan. Producer Kuhn subsequently had approximately 10,000 VHS tapes produced for North American video store rentals and sales, but the release of these was aborted following Columbia TriStar's acquisition of the film and subsequent re-edit and title change.

Columbia Tristar Home Video released the film on VHS in the United States on February 24, 1998, before reissuing it in September 1998 for the Halloween season. A DVD release from Columbia TriStar followed on July 13, 1999. The Columbia Tristar DVD was reissued with new cover artwork in 2003. In 2001, Lionsgate, who purchased CFP Distribution shortly after the film's 1997 theatrical run, released the film on DVD in Canada; the Canadian release featured a 94-minute cut of the film.

In June 2018, Scream Factory announced a forthcoming Collector's Edition Blu-ray, slated for a September 25, 2018 release. On July 10, 2018, the horror media website Bloody Disgusting reported that the release had to be delayed due to the proposed artwork, which had originally featured stars Zellweger and McConaughey, whose images were to be removed due to licensing issues. The Blu-ray was ultimately released on December 11, 2018. It features both the 1997 theatrical cut, as well as the 94-minute director's cut with optional commentary by writer-director Henkel, and several other special features.

== Reception ==
=== Box office ===
During the film's original theatrical run beginning in September 1995, it earned $28,235 during its opening weekend across 27 theaters, and went on to gross a total of $44,272 by the conclusion of its theatrical exhibition. The 1997 revised version of the film (as Texas Chainsaw Massacre: The Next Generation) earned $53,111 on 23 screens between August 29 and September 1, 1997, ranking number 23 at the U.S. box office. After 17 weeks of domestic distribution, the film concluded its second theatrical run with total earnings of $141,626.

Between its two releases, the film grossed a total of $185,898, rendering it a box-office bomb. As of 2025, it is the poorest-performing film in The Texas Chainsaw Massacre franchise.

=== Critical response ===
The Return of the Texas Chainsaw Massacre received mixed to negative reviews from film critics. On the review aggregator website Rotten Tomatoes, 15% of 40 critics' reviews are positive, with an average rating of 3.5/10. The website's consensus reads: "The Next Generation has the fortune of starring early-career Matthew McConaughey and Renée Zellweger, but it services neither headliner well in a convoluted and cheap-looking slasher that doesn't live up to the Texas Chainsaw Massacre legacy." Metacritic, which uses a weighted average, assigned the film a score of 50 out of 100, based on 11 critics, indicating "mixed or average" reviews.

==== Initial reaction ====
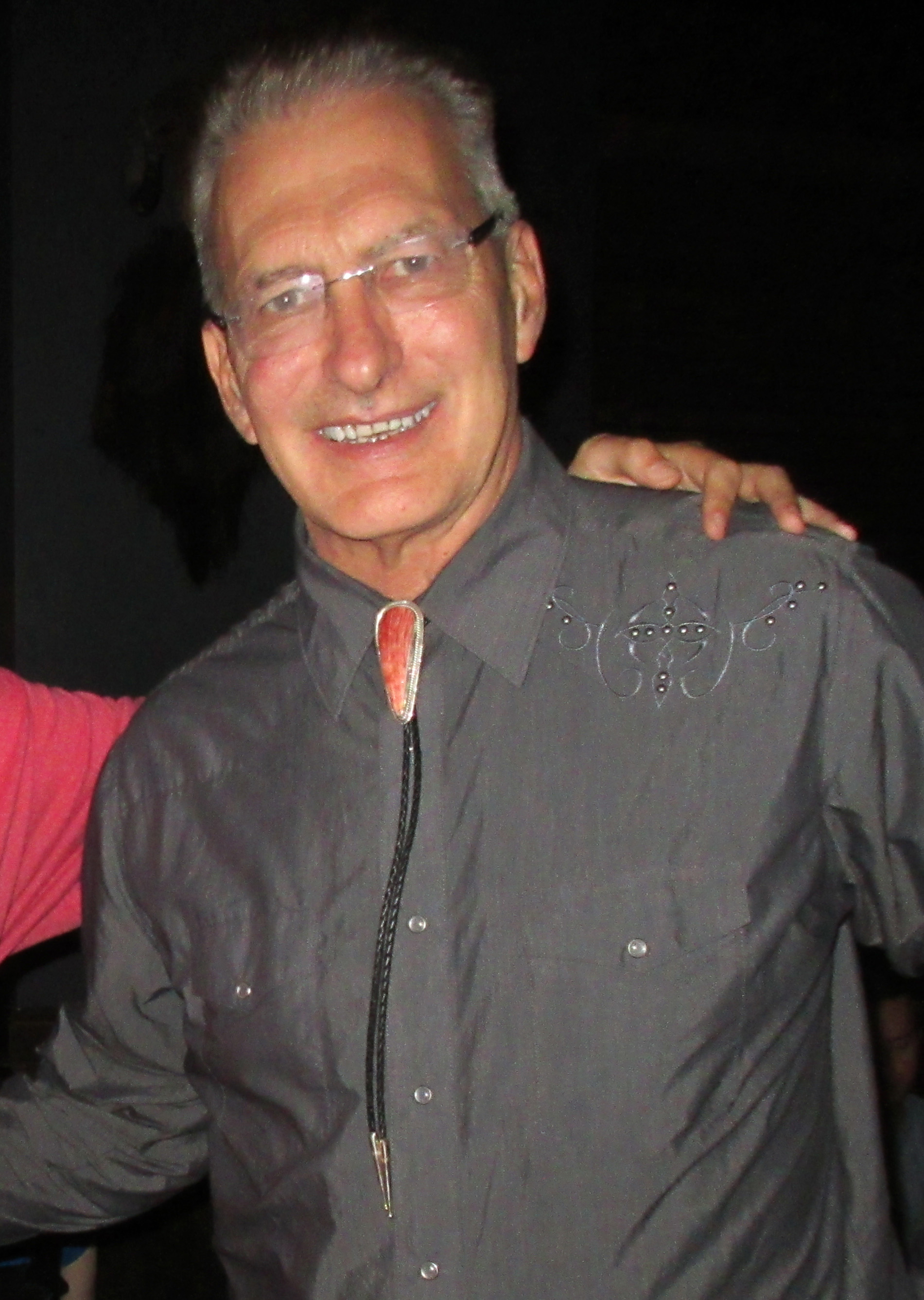
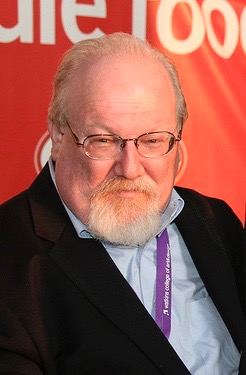
Film critics Joe Bob Briggs and Joe Leydon both praised the film

Reviewing the film after its screening at the Boston Film Festival in 1995, Betsy Sherman of The Boston Globe described it as a "shameless rehash" of the original, adding: "Henkel's idea of an imaginative stroke is to put [Leatherface] in red lipstick and black widow drag. No thanks, Julie Newmar." Natasha Kassulke of the Wisconsin State Journal was similarly unimpressed by the film, feeling its dark comedy was poorly executed, as well as criticizing it for its lack of gore.

Alternately, critic Joe Bob Briggs championed the film upon its South by Southwest screening, referring to it as "a flick so terrifying and brilliant that it makes the other two Chainsaw sequels seem like 'After-School Specials'" and declared it the best horror film of the 1990s. Joe Leydon of Variety wrote that the film "manages the difficult feat of being genuinely scary and sharply self-satirical all at once... it is adept at keeping its audience in a constant state of jumpiness." He also praised cinematographer Levie Isaacks' camerawork, Sandra Adair's editing, and Deborah Pastor's production design for lending the film the "feel of a wide-awake nightmare," as well as lauding Zellweger's lead performance, calling her "the most formidable scream queen since Jamie Lee Curtis went legit."

Reviewing the film during its 1995 limited release, Dave Jewett of The Columbian awarded it two-and-a-half out of four stars, noting: "Things don't always make sense, and important things go unexplained, but that's part of the nightmarish ambience in this crazed movie with crazy humor." He went on to declare that director Henkel "has probably come as close as anyone could to putting a nightmare on film." John Foyston of The Oregonian awarded the film a three out of four star-rating, praising the "over-the-top" performances, "hallucinatory" imagery, and elements of dark comedy: "Henkel has managed to suffuse the film with the same loony—and relatively bloodless—intensity that made 1974's The Texas Chain Saw Massacre a cult hit." The Atlanta Journal's Steve Murray similarly praised the film's comedic tone, observing that "the heart of the film is its raucous homicidal family, a comically feuding group so dysfunctional they sometimes forget to get on with the job of slaughter," and awarding the film a two and a half out of four-star rating.

==== Re-release reviews ====
Upon the film's 1997 release, many of the critical reviews focused on the lead performances of Zellweger and McConaughey, who had garnered significant fame in the interim. (Note: Several critics, including Janet Maslin, Terry Lawson of the Detroit Free Press, Mike Clark of USA Today, and others commented on the contributions of Zellweger and McConaughey in the film, as well as its re-release following their fame.) Janet Maslin of The New York Times wrote: "It was way back in 1995 that this schlocky horror farce, then known as Return of the Texas Chainsaw Massacre, first appeared with the unknown actors Matthew McConaughey and Renee Zellweger in starring roles. But even in a film whose principal props include litter, old pizza slices and a black plastic trash bag, it's clear that these two were going places." Rob Patterson of the Austin American-Statesman awarded the film three out of four stars and praised the performances, noting: "Everyone here certainly pushes at the ceiling of near-absurdity, yet The Next Generation never quite goes over the top." Terry Lawson of the Detroit Free Press similarly championed the lead performances of Zellweger and McConaughey, but expressed disappointment in the "men in black" subplot and that writer-director Henkel "turns poor Leatherface into a whimpering drag queen." The New York Daily News also noted that "Zellweger impresses in her strenuous, scream-driven turn as Jenny," as well as praising the performances of McConaughey and Tonie Perenski.

Joe Leydon, who previously reviewed the film during its 1995 release for Variety, was critical of the revised cut of the film, specifically its elimination of the opening sequence in which Jenny is abused by her stepfather, describing it as "a pity, because, as the original version of the film makes clear, after Jenny’s altercations with sexual predators in her own home, it would take something a lot more formidable than some masked doofus with a chain saw to keep her intimidated for long." He did note, however, that the revised cut still retained "a kind of nightmarish dream logic, so that the usual laws of cause-and-effect had little relevance."

Mike Clark of USA Today described the film as "The kind of cinematic endeavor where you suspect both cast and crew were obligated to bring their own beer," while Owen Gleiberman wrote in Entertainment Weekly that it "recapitulates the absurdist tabloid-redneck comedy of the great, original Chainsaw without a hint of its primal terror," and likened McConaughey's performance to "the worst" of Dennis Hopper and Woody Harrelson. Margaret McGurk of The Cincinnati Enquirer also remarked the film's muddled narrative, writing: "The script, such as it is, establishes a new benchmark for incoherence. Something about some teens who wander away on prom night and run up against a family of psycho-cannibal-thrill-killers... Of course, there is no point to any of it, either the humor or the creepy (though relatively bloodless) mayhem—except maybe the permanent embarrassment of poor Matthew [McConaughey] and Renée [Zellweger]." John Anderson of the Los Angeles Times wrote that the film was "neither innovative enough nor scary enough nor funny enough to sustain itself" and described it as the kind that "Wes Craven's Scream has now rendered virtually defunct... What we want from Texas Chainsaw Massacre: The Next Generation is a giddy mix of gruesome horror and campy humor. What we get is less massacre than mess."

The Hollywood Reporter's Dave Hunter similarly noted the film as being "blackly comic and extreme," while Nathan Rabin of The A.V. Club summarized it as "a slightly above-average slasher film that's only partially redeemed by small but endearingly loopy shreds of black humor." Boxoffice magazine's Karen Achenbach also commented on the film's humor, writing, "although sometimes funny at the film's expense, much of this 1994 production contains clever humor built through snappy dialogue and the creation of incongruent characters." The Ann Arbor News echoed this sentiment, describing it as "a refreshingly berserk piece of work."

Marjorie Baumgarten of The Austin Chronicle gave the film a favorable review, stating: "Writer-director Kim Henkel penned the original Chainsaw and this effort shows that he still has a felicitous grasp of the things that cause us to shudder in dread." The Fort Worth Star-Telegram's Michael H. Price awarded the film a favorable three out of five star-rating, commending Henkel for sustaining "a mood of raw anxiety throughout... [his] mixture of scares and self-satire is rich."

=== Accolades ===
Institution	Year	Category	Recipient	Result	Ref.
Drive-In Academy Awards	1996	Best Director	Kim Henkel	Nominated	
Saturn Awards	1997	Best Home Video Release	Texas Chainsaw Massacre: The Next Generation	Nominated	

== Analysis ==
=== Secret society subplot ===
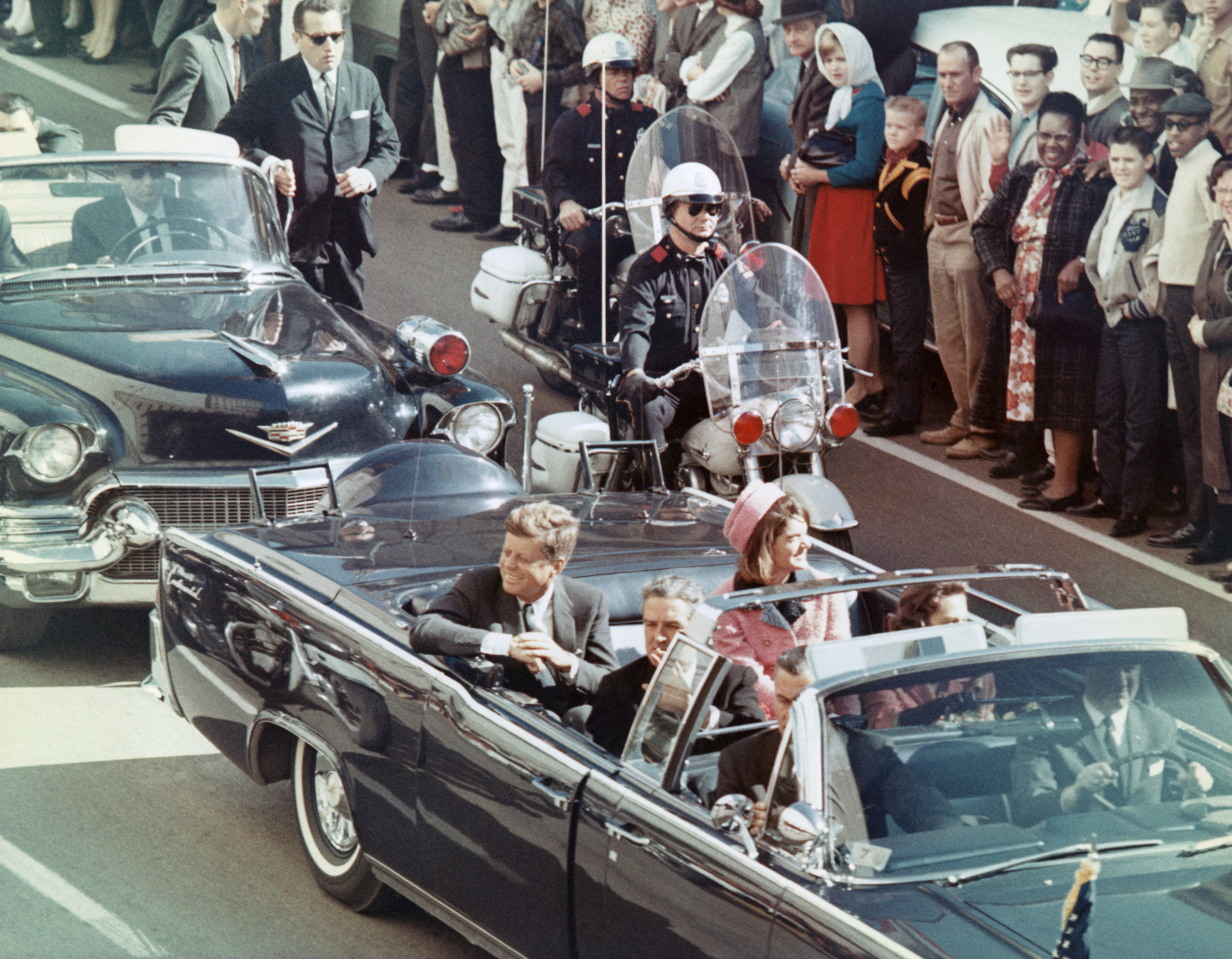
The film features a conspiracy subplot that suggests a connection between the film's villains to a secret society also responsible for such events as the 1963 John F. Kennedy assassination in Dallas.

The Return of The Texas Chainsaw Massacre has been noted for its implementation of a secret society subplot driving Leatherface's family to terrorize civilians in order to provoke them to a level of transcendence. In retrospective interviews, writer-director Kim Henkel confirmed that the basis of the subplot was influenced by theories surrounding the Illuminati. Commenting on the film's ominous Rothman character, Henkel stated that he "comes off more like the leader of some harum-scarum cult that makes a practice of bringing victims to experience horror on the pretext that it produces some sort of transcendent experience. Of course, it does produce a transcendent experience. Death is like that. But no good comes of it. You're tortured and tormented, and get the crap scared out of you, and then you die."

Other references to the Illuminati are made in the film's dialogue, specifically in the scene in which Darla tells Jenny about the thousands-years-old secret society in control of the U.S. government, and makes reference to the Kennedy assassination. The tow truck driven by the Vilmer character in the film is also seen branded with the word "Illuminati" on the door.

According to Henkel, his inspiration for this subplot was designed as a response to the desensitization of violence and death in the modern era: "The background to [these] particular characters' thinking is that what has occurred over time is the way which people die, the way people approach death, has been radically changed... we are removed from the reality of it, the horror of it, because we're medicated, advances in medicine isolate and insulate us from it—and what we wanted to institute was a real confrontation with the horror of death." Critic Russell Smith noted this plot point in his 1995 review of the film, positing: "Could the unexplained "them" be an allusion to the insatiable horror audience that always makes these gorefests a good investment, or is it a cabal of governmental powermongers...?"

Elements of this subplot are referenced in Henkel's 2012 film Butcher Boys. It is not an official The Texas Chainsaw Massacre film in name, but was initially written as a sequel to The Texas Chain Saw Massacre. Henkel's Butcher Boys was initially written as a sequel to The Texas Chain Saw Massacre.

=== Parody and self-reference ===
Henkel's paralleled reconstruction of scenes from The Texas Chain Saw Massacre (left) led some to describe The Return of the Texas Chainsaw Massacre (right) as a quasi-remake of the original film.

At the time of the film's initial release in 1995, it was noted among critics as a "sharp self-parody" of the original The Texas Chain Saw Massacre. Though sometimes billed as a sequel or direct sequel to the original film, it has also been described as a remake, as it features a similar structure and "shot-for-shot" recreations of scenes featured in the 1974 film. Henkel himself admitted that his approach "amounts to almost being a structural remake of the first film, with a new cast and characters." Writing for Tudum in a 2022 retrospective of the franchise, Reyna Cervantes observes that the film "blurs the line between reboot and parody."

The film is recursive in that it opens with an intertitle referring to two "minor, yet apparently related incidents", a joking acknowledgment of the previous two sequels, The Texas Chainsaw Massacre 2 (1986) and Leatherface: The Texas Chainsaw Massacre III (1990). Unlike the previous films in the franchise, none of the characters in The Return of the Texas Chainsaw Massacre die by a chainsaw. Justin Yandell of Bloody Disgusting interprets the film as a cynical reimagining of the original film, with Henkel parodying his own work. He cites Leatherface's ineffectiveness at dispatching his victims as well as the archetypical teenage characters as evidence of the film being a commentary on the declining state of horror films in the late 1980s and early 1990s:

Leatherface, once efficient, methodical and near-silent, now struggles to competently capture or kill his victims, all the while screaming like a petulant child. The family, no longer backwater cannibals, dines on pizza instead of the fresh meat of their victims. The dinner sequence, originally one of the most effective and horrifying scenes ever committed to film, goes so far off the rails it climaxes with Jenny turning the tables on her captors and scolding Leatherface into sitting down and shutting up. The ineffectiveness of it all [is] intentional, and we know this because a man in a limo pulls up and openly acknowledges it."

=== Gender and sexuality ===
Another element noted by both critics and film scholars is Leatherface's overt cross-dressing, which was briefly explored in the original film but implemented to a greater extent in this film. Robert Wilonsky of the Houston Press commented on the film's treatment of the character, writing that the film "turns Leatherface (here played by Robbie Jacks, an Austin songwriter who used to host a smacked-up radio show with Butthole Surfer Gibby Haynes) into a cross-dressing nancy boy who screams more than he saws."

According to Henkel, he wrote the character as one who assumes the persona of the person whose face he wears: "The confused sexuality of the Leatherface character is complex and horrifying at the same time," he said in a 1996 interview. Film scholar Scott Von Doviak also took note of this, likening Leatherface's presentation in the film to that of a "tortured drag queen." Jacks himself stated that Leatherface is "much more subjugated in this one than in the other films. It's shown in this that he really is tortured in many ways, not specifically by any of the other characters, but also by whatever is own malady is."

Henkel also commented that there are "strange sexual things that go on [in the screenplay]—not only Darla and Vilmer of course, but Darla and Jenny as well."

== Legacy ==
In the years since its release, Texas Chainsaw Massacre: The Next Generation has gone on to develop a cult following. Literary critic John Kenneth Muir wrote in Horror Films of the 1990s (2011) that the film's dark humor "works" and that its conspiracy angle "breathes new life into a familiar story, and the performances, especially by McConaughey and Zellweger, are strong. Additionally, the movie evidences a sharp wit, and there's even a sense of homage too, to franchise history."

Writing in a 2017 retrospective for Bloody Disgusting, Chris Vander Kaay notes that the film's secret society subplot serves as a precursor to Pascal Laugier's horror film Martyrs (2008), which features a similar plot in which individuals are tortured by a secret cabal for "spiritual" purposes. Several other contemporary critics have observed that a similar plot twist is repeated in the film The Cabin in the Woods (2011).

A clip from the film is featured in the 2002 drama film White Oleander, in which Zellweger portrays a former actress who is a foster parent; in the film, her character shows a scene from Texas Chainsaw Massacre: The Next Generation to her foster daughter as an example of one of her acting credits.

== Related works ==
The Return of the Texas Chainsaw Massacre was the last entry in the Texas Chainsaw Massacre franchise until the series was rebooted in 2003 with The Texas Chainsaw Massacre, a direct remake of the original 1974 film. The 2003 remake was followed by a prequel, The Texas Chainsaw Massacre: The Beginning (2006). In 2013, another direct sequel to the 1974 film, Texas Chainsaw 3D, was released, followed by the prequel Leatherface (2017). In 2022, another alternative sequel to the 1974 film, titled Texas Chainsaw Massacre, was released by Netflix, marking the ninth film in the franchise.

Brian Huberman, a British filmmaker and associate professor at Rice University, directed a documentary on the film's set during its production, titled The Return of the Texas Chainsaw: The Documentary (1996). Though never officially released on home media, the documentary aired on Austin Community Access Cable Television on June 7, 1997. In 2016, Huberman made the documentary available for streaming on his official website.

== Sources ==
- Abley, Sean; Doupé, Tyler (2022). Queer Horror: A Film Guide. Jefferson, North Carolina: McFarland & Company. ISBN 978-1-476-69027-8.
- Armstrong, Kent Byron (2003). Slasher Films: An International Filmography, 1960 Through 2001. Jefferson, North Carolina: McFarland & Company. ISBN 978-0-786-41462-8.
- Armstrong, Richard B.; Armstrong, Mary Willems, eds. (2015). Encyclopedia of Film Themes, Settings and Series. Jefferson, North Carolina: McFarland & Company. ISBN 978-1-476-61230-0.
- Biodrowski, Steve (December 1995). "Director Kim Henkel revs the chainsaw, again" (PDF). Cinefantastique. Vol. 27, no. 3. pp. 13, 61. ISSN 0145-6032.
- Dixon, Wheeler W. (2010). A History of Horror. Rutgers, New Jersey: Rutgers University Press. ISBN 978-0-813-54795-4.
- Harper, Jim (2004). Legacy of Blood: A Comprehensive Guide to Slasher Movies. London, England: Critical Vision. ISBN 978-1-900-48639-2.
- Henkel, Kim; Stevens, Joe; Huberman, Brian; Nobile, Phil Jr. (moderator) (2018). The Return of the Texas Chainsaw Massacre (Blu-ray audio commentary). Scream Factory. OCLC 1059473535.
- Huberman, Brian (dir.) (1996). The Return of the Texas Chainsaw Massacre: The Documentary (Documentary film). Huberman/Wolf Productions – via YouTube.
- Jaworzyn, Stefan (2003). The Texas Chain Saw Massacre Companion. London, England: Titan Books. ISBN 978-1-840-23660-6.
- Macor, Allison (2010). Chainsaws, Slackers, and Spy Kids: Thirty Years of Filmmaking in Austin, Texas. Austin, Texas: University of Texas Press. ISBN 978-0-292-72243-9.
- Muir, John Kenneth (2011). Horror Films of the 1990s. Jefferson, North Carolina: McFarland & Company. ISBN 978-0-786-48480-5.
- Olivier, Marc (2023). "Tools of the Trade: A Statistical Analysis of Slasher Hardware". In Briefel, Aviva; Middleton, Jason (eds.). Labors of Fear: The Modern Horror Film Goes to Work. Austin, Texas: University of Texas Press. pp. 15–36. ISBN 978-1-477-32723-4.
- Stevenson, Jay (August 1997). "Texas Chainsaw Massacre IV" (PDF). Cinefantastique. Vol. 29, no. 3. pp. 56–57. ISSN 0145-6032. Archived (PDF) from the original on July 7, 2021.
- Von Doviak, Scott (2012). Hick Flicks: The Rise and Fall of Redneck Cinema. Jefferson, North Carolina: McFarland & Company. ISBN 978-0-786-48212-2.
- Wooley, John (September 1994). "Return of the Texas Chainsaw Massacre Cuts Deep". Fangoria. No. 136. pp. 50–55, 74. ISSN 0164-2111. Archived from the original on December 27, 2023.
