= Camp Massacre =

- Directed by: Jim O'Rear; Daniel Emery Taylor
- Written by: Daniel Emery Taylor
- Produced by: Daniel Emery Taylor
- Starring: Bree Olson; Al Snow; Megan Hunt
- Cinematography: John Marc Green
- Edited by: Jim O'Rear
- Music by: Jim O'Rear
- Production company: Deviant Pictures II
- Release date: 22 March 2014 (Movie Days/The Dark Zone)
- Running time: 130 minutes
- Country: United States
- Language: English

Camp Massacre (originally titled Fat Chance) is a 2014 American comedy horror slasher film directed by Jim O'Rear and Daniel Emery Taylor, starring Bree Olson, Al Snow and Megan Hunt.

== Cast ==
- Al Snow as Ritz
- Megan Hunt as Stefani
- Daniel Emery Taylor as Greg
- Jim O'Rear as Warren W. Gilley
- G. Larry Butler as Coach T.A.
- Scott Tepperman as Franklin
- Bree Olson as Hailey

== Reception ==
Blacktooth of Horror Society gave the film a rating of 3 out of 5, writing that "Overall, Camp Massacre is a flawed slasher that is funny but could have been a lot funnier and bloodier. However, if you take it for what it is you will still have a good time. It is well worth your time." Todd Martin of HorrorNews.net wrote a positive review of the film, writing that "Despite its weaknesses the movie is fun and has a lot of heart, and it definitely worth checking out if you are in the mood for something a little different." Mark L. Miller of Ain't It Cool News wrote a positive review of the film, writing that "the quality gore, fun tone and premise, and the simple fact that it has fat guys falling down and trying to do action qualifies CAMP MASSACRE as entertaining to me."

Jeremy Blitz of DVD Talk wrote a negative review of the film, writing that it is "too long by forty minutes, poorly thought out and haphazardly executed. Some of the performances are okay, and Al Snow is actually fun to watch. But a lot of the time it seems as if the actors are ad libbing, and not given the chance to work on it enough to get the timing or other performance beats down. The film is neither scary nor funny."
