= Dust of Life =

Dust of Life may refer to:

- Dust of Life (1995 film), a 1995 film by Rachid Bouchareb
- Dust of Life: A True Ban Vinai Love Story, a 2004 novel by G. Y. Lee.
- Dust of Life (2009 film), a film by Le-Van Kiet
