= Absolute Evil – Final Exit =

2009 film

- German DVD release cover
- Directed by: Ulli Lommel
- Written by: Ulli Lommel
- Produced by: Ulli Lommel; Nola Roeper
- Starring: Carolyn Neff; Rusty Joiner; David Carradine; Ulli Lommel; Christopher Kriesa; Elissa Dowling
- Edited by: Christian Behm; Brian Lopiano; Frank Schönfelder
- Music by: Robert J. Walsh
- Release date: 8 February 2009 (Berlinale)
- Running time: 90 minutes
- Countries: Germany; United States
- Language: English
- Budget: $1.2 million

Absolute Evil – Final Exit is a 2009 German-American thriller film written and directed by Ulli Lommel. The film stars Carolyn Neff, Rusty Joiner and David Carradine (in his final film before his death). The film premiered at the Berlin International Film Festival on 8 February 2009.

== Premise ==
Lovers Savannah (Carolyn Neff) and Cooper (Rusty Joiner) share a childhood trauma. But just as they seem to have conquered their inner demons, the past catches up with them, and they are soon pursued by enigmatic gang leader Raf (David Carradine) and his plans of retaliation and murder.

== Cast ==
Actor	Role
Carolyn Neff	Savannah Miller
Rusty Joiner	Cooper Lee Baines
David Carradine	Raf McCane
Ulli Lommel	Rick
Christopher Kriesa	Beauregard
Elissa Dowling	Lillie McCane
Mark Irvingsen	Ringo
Jamie Bernadette	Maggie

== Premiere ==
The film was accepted to Berlin International Film Festival and saw its premiere in February 2009. The film was shown in the Panorama section.

The Hollywood Reporter published an online review of Absolute Evil, in which Peter Brunette wrote: "At least once every festival, critics collectively scratch their heads and say "How did THAT get selected?" Absolute Evil is the tentative awardee for worst film at this year's Berlinale. Shot in an ugly digital format (not HD) that is often out of focus, the stock thriller structure also sports horribly clichéd, repetitive dialogue, dramatic "gestures" that we've seen a thousand times, and very bad performances (with the exception of David Carradine, who seems to be having the time of his life). Commercial prospects, aside from a few DVD buyers who might be seeking campy entertainment, seem quite remote."

== Trilogy ==
Absolute Evil – Final Exit is the first part of the trilogy that will continue with Absolute Evil – Life After Death and Absolute Evil – Back from the Dead.
