= Memme =

Memme is a surname. Notable people with the surname include:

- Martina De Memme (born 1991), Italian swimmer
- Tanya Memme (born 1971), Canadian actress and television presenter
