= Roger Hazard =

American designer and television personality

Chris Stout Hazard
- Born: April 27, 1959 (age 67); Houston, Texas
- Other name: John Roger Hazard
- Years active: 2003–present
- Spouse: Chris Stout (2011–present)
- Website: http://www.rogerandchris.com

Roger Hazard (born April 27, 1959) is an American designer, television presenter, and producer best known as the home stager and designer on Sell This House.

== Early life ==
Born in Houston, Texas, Hazard attended Texas A&M University and was a member of the university's Corps of Cadets. He studied Horticulture and Architectural Design.

== Career ==
Hazard originated the role of home stager and designer on A&E's Sell This House from its debut in 2003 through 2011. He has also starred on Move This House and contributed to Sell This House: Extreme, both for A&E.

In 2012, Hazard left A&E and, with husband Chris Stout, launched Roger + Chris, a furniture and home design company. That same year, the couple relocated from Austin, Texas, to Sharon Springs, New York.

In 2014, the couple completed extensive renovations to their new Victorian home in Sharon Springs.
