= Between Worlds =

2018 Spanish film by Maria Pulera

- Theatrical release poster
- Directed by: Maria Pulera
- Written by: Maria Pulera
- Produced by: David Hillary; Maria Pulera; Eric Banoun
- Starring: Nicolas Cage; Franka Potente; Penelope Mitchell; Garrett Clayton; Lydia Hearst; Hopper Penn
- Cinematography: Thomas Hencz
- Edited by: Tim Silano
- Music by: Jason Solowsky
- Production companies: Voltage Pictures; Rise Up
- Distributed by: Lionsgate; Saban Films
- Release date: December 14, 2018 (United States)
- Running time: 90 minutes
- Country: Spain
- Language: English
- Box office: $146,339

Between Worlds is a 2018 supernatural thriller film starring Nicolas Cage, and directed by Maria Pulera. The film was released on December 14, 2018, by Saban Films.

The story follows Joe (Cage), a down-on-his-luck truck driver haunted by the memory of his deceased wife and child. He meets Julie (Potente), a spiritually gifted woman who enlists Joe in a desperate effort to find the lost soul of her comatose daughter, Billie (Mitchell). But the spirit of Joe's dead wife Mary proves stronger, possessing the young woman's body while intending to settle her unfinished business with the living.

== Plot ==
At an Alabama truck stop, truck driver Joe Majors walks in on a woman, Julie, being choked and seemingly assaulted by another man. He grabs the man and pulls him off Julie. However, Julie goes on to explain that she had asked the man to choke her. She relays a childhood experience during which she nearly drowned and had an out-of-body experience which allowed her to enter the spirit world. Since her daughter Billie was recently left in a coma after a motorcycle accident, Julie, desperate to save her, was trying to find Billie's spirit in the nether world to return it to her body when Joe walked in on her being choked. Joe – whose wife and daughter tragically died – takes Julie to the hospital to witness Billie go into cardiac arrest. Julie makes Joe choke her and enters the nether realm to lead Billie's spirit back to her body. Billie survives.

Joe accompanies Julie home and, even though Joe feels and looks as though he's been on the road for three days, they have sex. He stays with Julie for the next few days and is fired for not completing his duties in a timely fashion. He laments that a man without a truck is not a man. Billie is discharged from the hospital. While her injuries are healing, her demeanor seems odd to Julie and to her friends Mike and Rick. She also makes sexual advances to Joe, who is confused but not uninterested. While Julie drives into town to retrieve Joe's belongings from his former employer, Billie reveals to Joe that she is not in fact Billie but the spirit of his deceased wife, Mary, who has taken over Billie's body. Joe is quick to believe her and starts to engage in frisky activities with her, rushing to cover up their exploits when Julie returns home.

Julie is suspicious of Joe's and Billie's behavior and speaks to a nurse from the hospital who is knowledgeable about the logistics of the spirit world. She tells Julie that the spirit that returned to Billie's body is not Billie's and suggests that it is likely that of Joe's dead wife. Meanwhile, Joe and Billie/Mary have intense intercourse at home. During his coitus with Billie, Joe is drawn into a dreamlike memory or alternate world in which he is having sex with Mary. Julie returns home and Joe panics, while Billie assures him that all he's hearing is the cat. He astutely objects, "You don't have a cat," just before Julie walks in on them in the act. Julie is furious and demands that Joe help her expel Mary's spirit from Billie's body. Billie/Mary knocks Julie unconscious to stop her and asks Joe to run away with her.

Billie and Joe intend to rob Mike and Rick. Joe knocks out Mike (who has affections for Billie) and gets into a scuffle with Rick, fatally shooting him by accident. Billie/Mary takes the cash she finds at the house and takes Joe back to the ruins of the house in which Joe and Mary used to live with their daughter Sarah until Mary and Sarah died in a tragic fire allegedly caused by accident. Meanwhile, Mike confronts Julie, who tells him about Billie's and Mary's spirits being swapped. Joe gets emotional when he finds Sarah's jack-in-a-box as he still blames himself for her and Mary's deaths. Joe and Billie/Mary vow to rebuild their relationship, but Mike and Julie walk in on them and hold them up at gun point. Billie/Mary draws a gun on Julie and admits to killing Sarah before setting the house on fire on purpose as she says she is "not good on her own". Julie walks towards Billie/Mary and is fatally shot by her. Julie forces Mary's spirit back into the nether realm with her, allowing Billie's spirit to re-enter her own body.

Joe is distraught by what he has learned about Sarah's death. He cradles her jack-in-the-box while calling out her name lamentingly, then pours gasoline over himself, puts a cigarette in his mouth and sets it – and himself – on fire. Seemingly not feeling any pain, he puts the cigarette out on himself as the house around him burns down, yet again. Billie and Mike flee the scene, leaving Julie's dead body behind, and drive off. In the epilogue, we see a memory from Joe's earlier life, during which he presumably shoots his abusive father.

== Cast ==
- Nicolas Cage as Joe Majors
- Franka Potente as Julie
- Penelope Mitchell as Billie
- Garrett Clayton as Mike
- Lydia Hearst as Mary
- David Lee Smith as Kirby
- Brit Shaw as Lettie
- Hopper Penn as Rick
- Eric Scarabin as Counter Guy
- Cameron James McIntyre as Young Joe
- Paris Bravo as Young Julie

== Production ==
Filming began in Mobile, Alabama, at the end of August 2017 and took place over the course of 23 days.

According to director Maria Pulera, she initially wrote the film as a standard thriller, but later made it "a much more surreal drama in the vein of David Lynch". Pulera wrote the character of Joe with Cage in mind and allowed the actor to improvise for many scenes, including Joe and Billie/Mary's frolicsome water hose fight.

== Reception ==
Between Worlds received mostly negative reviews, with review aggregator Rotten Tomatoes showing an approval rating of 32%. The site's critical consensus reads, "While definitely in line with some of Nicolas Cage's stranger efforts, Between Worlds is too silly and messy to call it good, even in a weird way." BuzzFeed did note Nicolas Cage's performance for engaging in a very risqué on-screen romp with actress Penelope Mitchell and calling it his raciest performance of his career.

== Analysis ==
Between Worlds features aspects of Surrealism and postmodern experimentalism. In many respects, it is evocative of the works of David Lynch, especially the TV series Twin Peaks. Like Twin Peaks, the film features other realms or spirit worlds, dreamlike sequences, aspects of grotesque comedy, a score reminiscent of that of Twin Peaks (which was partly composed by long-time Lynch composer Angelo Badalamenti) and a seductive but fragile teenage girl at the heart of the plot. Between Worlds also uses experimental camera angles and editing techniques as well as aspects of meta-fiction, for example breaking the fourth wall in a scene in which Joe reads from a book titled “Memories by Nicolas Cage.” The character of Joe also seems to allude to a range of previous roles played by Cage, including Alabama native Cameron Poe from Con Air, snakeskin leather aficionado Sailor Ripley from Lynch's Wild at Heart and chain-smoking Johnny Blaze from Ghost Rider, thus pointing to the larger Nicolas Cage movie metaverse.

Central themes include the idea of the afterlife, grief, trauma, parent-child relationships, feminist psychoanalytic theory, metaphysics, epistemology, shamanism and the decline of the American working class under contemporary neoliberalism.
