= John Dugan (actor) =

American actor

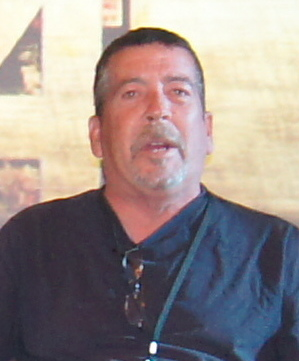
- Dugan at the TCM panel at Days of the Dead Indianapolis 2012
- Born: February 7, 1953 (age 72); Brazil, Indiana, U.S.
- Occupation: Actor
- Years active: 1974–present
- Known for: Portraying Grandpa Sawyer in The Texas Chain Saw Massacre
- Spouse: Stacey Boand Dugan

John Dugan (born February 7, 1953) is an American actor. He is best known for his role in The Texas Chain Saw Massacre (1974) and Texas Chainsaw 3D (2013) as Grandpa Sawyer. He also had a cameo appearance in the fourth installment of that series, The Return of the Texas Chainsaw Massacre.

Dugan took a hiatus from acting until the 2000s, when he started making appearances and acting in independent films again, appearing in features produced by Horror Wasteland Pictures International. He played Dr. Harper in Bobby Easley's adaptation of Stephen King's The Boogeyman (2014) and All Sinners Night (2014). John has most recently been seen in The Hospital opposite actor/stuntman Jim O'Rear. 2015 starred in Tony Moran's biopic Horror Icon: Inside Michael’s Mask with Tony Moran. Dugan also stars in the 2016 psychological thriller drama Devils Ink as a corrupt politician who is also an abusive father. He also plays as the iconic Col Talaska in Horror Wasteland Pictures WW2 stop-motion film The Devil Dogs of Kilo Company (2016) as well as Grandpa McCormick in the horror-western Belly Timber (2016).

== Filmography ==
=== Film ===
Year	Title	Role	Notes
1974	The Texas Chain Saw Massacre	Grandpa Sawyer	
1995	The Return of the Texas Chainsaw Massacre	Cop at Hospital	
2000	The American Nightmare	—N/a	Documentary
2007	Monstrosity	Sheriff Turner	
2007	Shudder	Wilkes	Direct-to-video
2008	Hell-ephone	Captain of the Guard	
2012	Butcher Boys	Clerk	
2013	Texas Chainsaw 3D	Grandpa Sawyer	
2013	The Hospital	Officer Chapman	
2014	All Sinner's Night	Vietnam Veteran	
2014	The Boogeyman	Dr. Harper	
2015	Bite School	Henry	
2015	The Hospital 2	Officer Chapman	Uncredited
2015	The Devil Dogs of Kilo Company	Col. Talaska	
2015	True Fear: The Making of Psycho	—N/a	Documentary
2016	Belly Timber	Grandpa McCormick	
2016	Deviant Behavior	Murphy	
2017	Devils Ink	The Mayor	
2017	Rock, Paper, Scissors	Uncle Charles	

Records
Preceded by Gene Kelly as Danny McGuire	Reprising a role after the longest time 39 years 2013 – 2018	Succeeded by Nick Castle as The Shape
