= Steven H. Scheuer =

American film and TV historian and critic (1926 – 2014)

- Born: Steven Harry Scheuer; January 9, 1926; New York City, U.S.
- Died: May 31, 2014 (aged 88); New York City, U.S.
- Occupations: Film critic, television critic, film historian, television historian, newspaper columnist
- Years active: 1953−2003
- Spouses: Nikki Scheuer (divorced); Alida Brill (m. 1991)
- Children: 4

Steven Henry Scheuer (/ʃɔɪər/ SHOY-er) (January 9, 1926 – May 31, 2014) was a film and television historian and critic. He edited Movies on TV published between 1958 and 1993 and wrote The Movie Book (1974), subtitled A Comprehensive, Authoritative, Omnibus Volume on Motion Pictures and the Cinema World. He was moderator of the syndicated television series All About TV from 1969 to 1990. In 2002, he hosted and produced a 13-program series for public television, Television in America: An Autobiography.

== Life ==
Scheuer was born in New York City in 1926. His brothers were 13-term New York Congressman James H. Scheuer; Walter Scheuer, an investor and film producer; and Richard Scheuer, a scholar and philanthropist. He also had a sister, Amy Scheuer Cohen. He graduated from Fieldston School and went to Yale University where he graduated in 1948. He also attended the London School of Economics for a year.

At Yale, he was theater and film critic for the Yale Daily News. In 1950, Scheuer joined CBS as an assistant director and worked on such shows as Studio One and The Fred Waring Show.

In 1953, he founded TV Key, which produced a daily list of recommendations for what to watch on television and was distributed by King Features Syndicate and appeared in up to 300 newspapers. Capsule reviews for 5,000 films written by the staff of TV Key were compiled and published by Bantam Books in 1958 under the title TV Movie Almanac & Rating, edited by Scheuer. Seventeen editions of the book were published until 1993.

Scheuer died on May 31, 2014, in New York of congestive heart failure. His wife when he died was author and feminist social critic Alida Brill.

== The Movies on TV series ==
Movies on TV, first published in 1958 under the title TV Movie Almanac & Rating, was the first guide of its kind. It contained capsule reviews and ratings of movies using a four star rating system. By the release of Leonard Maltin's similarly titled TV Movies in September 1969 (later rebranded Leonard Maltin's Movie Guide), there had been five editions of Scheuer's book under four different names. At that time it contained 7,000 films compared to 8,000 in Maltin's TV Movies. It wasn't until the eighth edition (1978–79) that Scheuer started to include the movie's director and expanded the short synopses. It was renamed Movies on TV and Videocassette in 1989. Scheuer's book differed from Maltin's in that it featured a greater number of made-for-television productions, including aired television pilots that Maltin's book omitted.

== Selected works ==
- Movies on TV (17 editions, 1958–1993)
- The Movie Book (1974). ISBN 0872234134
- The Television Annual 1978-79 (1979). ISBN 0-02-081830-0
- Movie Blockbusters (ghostwritten by Jim Beaver (1982, revised 1983)
- Who's Who in Television and Cable (1983). ISBN 0871967472
- Box Office Champions: The Biggest Movie Blockbusters of All Time (1984)
- The Complete Guide to Videocassette Movies (1987). ISBN 0805001107
- The Pocket Guide to Collecting Movies on DVD (2003) (by Steven Scheuer and Alida Brill-Scheuer). ISBN 0743475712
