= A Question of Faith =

- Theatrical release poster
- Directed by: Kevan Otto
- Screenplay by: Ty Manns
- Produced by: Lisa Diane Washington; Angela White
- Starring: Richard T. Jones; Kim Fields; C. Thomas Howell; Renee O'Connor; Gregory Alan Williams; T.C. Stallings; Jaci Velasquez; Amber Thompson; Karen Valero
- Cinematography: Chase Bowman
- Edited by: Sean Olson
- Music by: Nelson Jackson
- Production company: Silver Lining Entertainment
- Distributed by: Pure Flix Entertainment
- Release date: September 29, 2017
- Country: United States
- Language: English
- Box office: $2.6 million

A Question of Faith is a 2017 American Christian drama film. This film was released on September 29, 2017, by Pure Flix Entertainment.

== Plot ==
When tragedy strikes three families, their destiny forces them on a converging path to discover God's love, grace and mercy as the challenges of their fate could also resurrect their beliefs.

== Cast ==
- Richard T. Jones as David Newman
- Kim Fields as Theresa Newman
- C. Thomas Howell as John Danielson
- Renee O'Connor as Mary Danielson
- Gregory Alan Williams as Farnsworth Newman
- T.C. Stallings as Cecil King
- Jaci Velasquez as Kate Hernandez
- Amber Thompson as Michelle Danielson
- Karen Valero as Maria Hernandez
- Donna Biscoe as Patricia Newman
- Maiya Boyd as Eric's School Friend
- Stephanie Wilkinson as Dr. Timmons
- Kenneth Israel as Dr. Moore
- Marliss Amiea as Lisa Pearl
- James Hooper as Junior Newman
- Thom Scott II as Jordan Mayberry
- Caleb T. Thomas as Eric Newman

== Release ==
A Question of Faith was released in the United States on September 29, 2017, and made $1 million from 661 theaters in its opening weekend (an average of $1,551 per venue).

=== Critical response ===
The Hollywood Reporter found the film "uplifting, if you’re a believer", acknowledging director Kevan Otto's passion for the film and Richard T. Jones's ability to make his character's arc "almost believable", but criticizing the heavy-handed storytelling and technical aspects of the film, which it found "more on the level of broadcast TV than cinema". The LA Times called it "a religious pamphlet with actors", saying that the script "plays like a first draft, one written from a manual and riddled with two-dimensional characters and on-the-nose dialogue." On review aggregator website Rotten Tomatoes, the film has an approval rating of 40% based on 5 reviews, and an average rating of 5.8/10.

== Soundtrack ==
The film features music by Nelson Jackson with additional score by Jason Solowsky. A soundtrack album was released that contains songs by The Nelons, Cecil Thompson, Amber Nelon Thompson, Deloris White, Y'Anna Crawley, and John Paul McGee.
