= Simeon Rice =

American football player (born 1974)

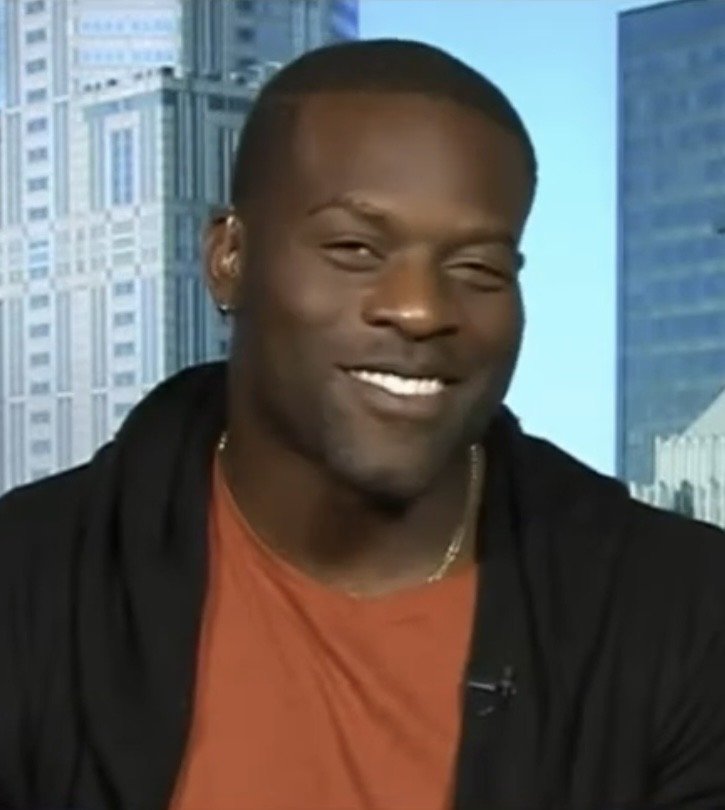
- Rice in 2017

No. 79, 97, 78
- Position: Defensive end

Personal information
- Born: February 24, 1974 (age 52); Chicago, Illinois, U.S.
- Listed height: 6 ft 5 in (1.96 m)
- Listed weight: 268 lb (122 kg)

Career information
- High school: Mount Carmel (Chicago)
- College: Illinois (1992–1995)
- NFL draft: 1996: 1st round, 3rd overall pick

Career history
- Arizona Cardinals (1996–2000); Tampa Bay Buccaneers (2001–2006); Denver Broncos (2007); Indianapolis Colts (2007); New York Sentinels (2009)

Awards and highlights
- Super Bowl champion (XXXVII); NFL Defensive Rookie of the Year (1996); First-team All-Pro (2002); 2× Second-team All-Pro (1999, 2003); 3× Pro Bowl (1999, 2002, 2003); NFL forced fumbles co-leader (2003); PFWA All-Rookie Team (1996); Tampa Bay Buccaneers Ring of Honor; Jack Lambert Trophy (1995); 2× First-team All-American (1994, 1995); Big Ten Defensive Lineman of the Year (1994); Big Ten Co-Freshman of the Year (1992); 3× First-team All-Big Ten (1993, 1994, 1995); Second-team All-Big Ten (1992)

Career NFL statistics
- Tackles: 483
- Sacks: 122
- Forced fumbles: 28
- Fumble recoveries: 8
- Passes defended: 43
- Interceptions: 5
- Stats at Pro Football Reference

Simeon James Rice (/ˈsɪmiən/ SIM-ee-ən; born February 24, 1974) is an American former professional football player who was a defensive end in the National Football League (NFL). He played college football for the Illinois Fighting Illini, and is the all-time sack leader in the Big Ten Conference. Rice was selected by the Arizona Cardinals third overall in the 1996 NFL draft.

In his 12-year NFL career, Rice recorded 122 sacks, forced 25 fumbles, recovered 8, and intercepted 5 passes. His official sack count ranks 23rd all-time in the NFL. In his first eight out of 10 seasons in the NFL, Rice recorded at least 10 sacks and in three of those seasons he recorded at least 15 sacks. He earned three Pro Bowl selections and earned a Super Bowl ring with the Tampa Bay Buccaneers in Super Bowl XXXVII, beating the Oakland Raiders. He has also played for the Denver Broncos, Indianapolis Colts, and New York Sentinels.

== Early life ==
Simeon Rice was born February 24, 1974, in Chicago, Illinois. He was the second-born of five children. His family lived in a 5-bedroom house on Chicago's south side. Rice's father worked on the assembly line at Ford Motor Company, and Rice's mother was a Special Education school teacher who worked with troubled children. Rice attended Mount Carmel High School on Chicago's south side, the same school as former NFL quarterback Donovan McNabb and former NBA star Antoine Walker.

Rice first became interested in football while playing pickup games with his brother in their neighborhood. His father knew that his son had the physical gifts of speed, size and strength to be a great athlete, but he insisted that Rice understand the importance of hard work. When the time came for Rice to attend high school, his parents sent him to Mt. Carmel, an all-boys Catholic school about an hour from where the Rice family lived.

Rice began his career at Mt. Carmel as a running back; the roster was so deep that Coach Frank Lenti moved Rice to tight end and defensive end before his junior season. Rice fought the move, purposely dropping passes and missing tackles in practice. He still did not see much action in games. Before his senior season, Coach Lenti had a talk with Rice and told him there was still time to be great at football, but he had to accept that he was better suited for defense. His senior season, he improved with every game, starting with the first game of the season against Joliet Catholic and their star running back, Mike Alstott. In the state championship game, with Mt. Carmel trailing, Rice had a sack that caused a turnover which gave the team the momentum to mount a comeback victory. Despite his talent, Rice was lightly recruited by major college football programs beyond his home state. Rice committed to the University of Illinois for college.

== College career ==
After three days of practice, University of Illinois defensive coordinator Denny Marcin told Rice's parents that their son was destined for greatness. He knew what greatness looked like after coaching Lawrence Taylor at North Carolina. In the third game of the season, Rice sacked Houston quarterback Jimmy Klingler three times and was named ABC's Player of the Game. That season, he had 9 sacks, a school record for a freshman and was voted the Big Ten rookie of the year. Rice's sophomore season was a disappointment for him and the team. Meanwhile, he studied hard and picked up extra credits in an attempt to graduate early. His junior season the team finished 6–5. Rice was a member of what was considered the best linebacker group in the country. His fellow linebacker Dana Howard won the Butkus award for best linebacker in the country. Kevin Hardy, another linebacker on the team, was named the team MVP. Rice had 16 sacks, a school record, and was named a 2nd team All-American. Perhaps his finest game of the season was against Washington State. He had 5 sacks, blocked a field goal, and recovered a fumble. By November, teams were devising special blocking schemes to keep Rice out of the backfield.

Following the season, Mel Kiper of ESPN stated that Rice may be the top pick in the draft if he decided to leave school early. His head coach Lou Tepper spoke with various NFL teams, who generally claimed that if Rice was selected in the first round, it would likely not be until the later half. With this information, Rice returned to Illinois for his senior year. The school attempted to create buzz for Rice to be considered for the Heisman Trophy, but that buzz was killed by their inability to score points. The team finished 5–5–1, although Rice had another phenomenal season, finishing with 12.5 sacks. Rice finished his collegiate football career as the Big Ten's all-time sack leader, and he also finished his degree on time. His immense pass-rushing talent made Rice a top overall prospect in the 1996 NFL draft, with many considering him to be the best player in the draft.

== Professional career ==
=== Pre-draft ===
Pre-draft measurables
Height	Weight	Arm length	Hand span	40-yard dash	10-yard split	20-yard split	Bench press
6 ft 5 in (1.96 m)	259 lb (117 kg)	36 1/4 in (0.92 m)	10 1/4 in (0.26 m)	4.79 s	1.72 s	2.77 s	26 reps
All values from NFL Combine

Rice attended the NFL Combine and was measured at 6'4" and weighing 259 pounds. After claiming he could run a 4.5 40-yard dash, he was timed as running it in 4.66 seconds.

=== Arizona Cardinals ===
In the 1996 NFL draft, Rice was selected in the first round with the third overall pick by the Arizona Cardinals. He was selected after Keyshawn Johnson and Kevin Hardy. After a contract dispute that lasted through training camp, Rice signed a 4-year, $9.5 million deal. Lining up at defensive end, Rice's first snap as a pro resulted in a tackle for a 2-yard loss on Indianapolis Colts running back Marshall Faulk. At the end of September, Rice had 5 sacks and was named NFL defensive rookie of the month. At the end of the season, Rice had 12.5 sacks which tied a rookie record and he was voted NFL Defensive Rookie of the Year by the Associated Press. In Rice's second season with the Cardinals, they finished 4–12. The fans grew impatient with the team. Rice himself lost the admiration of the fans by playing semi-professional basketball for the Philadelphia Power of the USBL. He played 11 minutes a game averaging 2.5 points and was paid $400 a game. In Rice's third season, the Cardinals made the playoffs and won their first post-season game since 1947. That season Rice had 10 sacks, 23 quarterback pressures, and 4 fumble recoveries. The following year, the team slipped to 6–10 in part because of injuries to many of their star players. Despite the team's poor play, Rice had 16.5 sacks and was named to his first Pro-Bowl. The next season, the year 2000, Rice was due a big pay increase, but the contract negotiation kept him off the field until the second game of the regular season. Rice had 7.5 sacks and the Cardinals fell to 3–13. At the end of the season, Rice was a free agent and was anxious to go to a new team.

=== Tampa Bay Buccaneers ===
The Tampa Bay Buccaneers signed Rice to a 5-year deal worth more than $30 million. He joined a defense that carried Tampa Bay to the playoffs the year before. His first season as a Buccaneer, Rice had 64 tackles and 11 sacks and the Buccaneers made the playoffs, but fell to the Philadelphia Eagles, 31–9. After the loss, head coach Tony Dungy was fired. The Buccaneers traded two 1st-round picks and two 2nd-round picks to the Oakland Raiders for Jon Gruden. Gruden's high-energy style and the addition of Keenan McCardell and Michael Pittman to the offense helped the Buccaneers reach the Super Bowl. They beat the Oakland Raiders 48–21 for the first Super Bowl victory in the Tampa Bay Buccaneers' history. Rice had 5 tackles and 2 sacks in the Super Bowl and 15.5 sacks on the season, including 11 sacks in a 5-game span. Over the next 3 seasons, the Buccaneers only had one with a winning record and lost the only playoff appearance they had. Rice had impressive seasons, recording 15, 12, and 14 sacks. The 2006 season saw the Buccaneers fall to 4–12 and Rice only had 2 sacks in 8 games played. He finished the second half of the season on injured reserve after requiring surgery for his left shoulder due to having bone chips that caused inflammation and soreness.

He was released by the Buccaneers before the start of the next season because of a failed physical. His five seasons of 10+ sacks were a franchise record when he left the team while his eight total seasons of 10+ sacks was fifth most in NFL history.

=== 2007 ===
In what would be his final season in the NFL, Rice played six games for the Denver Broncos with five tackles and no sacks and two games for the Indianapolis Colts with one sack. He later stated his regret in playing the year with a shoulder not completely healed. Rice left the NFL with 122 sacks.

After sitting out the 2008 season, Rice signed with the New York Sentinels of the United Football League on August 27, 2009.

== NFL career statistics ==
Legend
	Won the Super Bowl
	Led the league
**Bold**	Career high

=== Regular season ===
Year	Team	Games		Tackles					Interceptions					Fumbles			
Year	Team	GP	GS	Cmb	Solo	Ast	Sck	Sfty	Int	Yds	Lng	TD	PD	FF	FR	Yds	TD
1996	ARI	16	15	**50**	41	9	12.5	0	0	0	0	0	0	1	1	0	0
1997	ARI	16	15	47	33	**14**	5.0	0	1	0	0	0	0	1	0	0	0
1998	ARI	16	16	39	34	5	10.0	0	0	0	0	0	0	1	**4**	**39**	0
1999	ARI	16	16	48	37	11	**16.5**	0	0	0	0	0	1	5	1	0	0
2000	ARI	15	11	33	30	3	7.5	0	0	0	0	0	3	1	1	0	0
2001	TB	16	16	44	39	5	11.0	0	0	0	0	0	8	2	0	0	0
2002	TB	16	16	**50**	41	9	15.5	**1**	1	**30**	**30**	0	**11**	0	0	0	0
2003	TB	16	16	**50**	**45**	5	15.0	0	**2**	12	12	0	8	**6**	1	0	0
2004	TB	16	16	40	34	6	12.0	0	0	0	0	0	5	1	0	0	0
2005	TB	15	15	40	33	7	14.0	0	1	6	6	0	4	**6**	0	0	0
2006	TB	8	8	20	16	4	2.0	0	0	0	0	0	1	0	0	0	0
2007	DEN	6	1	8	5	3	0.0	0	0	0	0	0	2	0	0	0	0
2007	IND	2	0	1	1	0	1.0	0	0	0	0	0	0	0	0	0	0
Career		174	161	471	389	82	122.0	1	5	48	30	0	43	28	8	39	0

=== Postseason ===
Year	Team	Games		Tackles					Interceptions					Fumbles			
Year	Team	GP	GS	Cmb	Solo	Ast	Sck	Sfty	Int	Yds	Lng	TD	PD	FF	FR	Yds	TD
1998	ARI	2	2	0	0	0	0.0	0	0	0	0	0	0	0	0	0	0
2001	TB	1	1	7	4	**3**	2.0	0	0	0	0	0	0	1	0	0	0
2002	TB	3	3	**9**	**9**	0	**4.0**	0	0	0	0	0	0	**2**	**2**	**6**	0
2005	TB	1	1	6	5	1	1.0	0	0	0	0	0	**1**	0	0	0	0
Career		7	7	22	18	4	7.0	0	0	0	0	0	1	3	2	6	0

== Music and film career ==
After football, Rice began a career in the entertainment industry. He started his own Hip-Hop/R&B record label, named "Lucid Dream Entertainment." Yashi Rice, his younger sister and Legends Football League player, was his first signee. Yashi has released her first single, titled "Serious." He also appeared in Slum Village video "Climax" along with Saafir and Gary Coleman. A 2009 graduate of the New York Film Academy, Rice premiered his first short film as director, "When I Was King," two days before the Super Bowl XLV in Dallas.

Rice's first feature-length film as director, Unsullied, was released on August 28, 2015. The film stars Murray Gray, Rusty Joiner and James Gaudioso.

For the 2021 season, Rice joined WTSP in Tampa, Florida as a co-host for their pregame show The Blitz.

== Legacy ==
In his first ten seasons, Rice had 119 sacks, which was the most among all players in that span. In four separate seasons, Rice had 14 or more sacks, a mark only exceeded by Reggie White, Bruce Smith, and Kevin Greene. Rice has stated his belief that he should be in the Pro Football Hall of Fame, once stating that there is no Hall "without me in it." As of 2024, he has never been one of the 15 finalists discussed for induction nor has he made it as a semifinalist since 2020. He is currently 21st all-time in sacks in NFL history. Rice was also the second fastest player to achieve 100 career sacks behind Reggie White.

== Personal life ==
Rice's son Jordan Caroline is a professional basketball player for Kaohsiung Jeoutai Technology. He played college ball at Nevada.
