= Unsullied =

- Film poster
- Directed by: Simeon Rice
- Written by: John Nodilo; Simeon Rice
- Screenplay by: John Nodilo
- Produced by: Michelle Gracie
- Starring: Murray Gray; Rusty Joiner; James Gaudioso
- Cinematography: Scott Winig
- Edited by: Andrew Cohen
- Music by: Jason Solowsky
- Distributed by: Indican Pictures
- Release date: 28 August 2014
- Running time: 93 Minutes
- Country: United States
- Language: English

Unsullied is a 2014 exploitation horror film directed by Simeon Rice and starring Murray Gray, Rusty Joiner, and James Gaudioso.

== Premise ==
A female track star is kidnapped by two sociopaths when her car breaks down on a deserted road.

== Cast ==
- Murray Gray as Reagan
- Rusty Joiner as Noah
- James Gaudioso as Mason
- Cindy Karr as Claudine
- Nicole Paris Williams as Kim
- Erin Boyes as Zoe
- Malone Thomas as Emerson
- Michelle Gracie as Mrs. Farrow

== Reception ==
Unsullied received mixed reviews from critics. On the review aggregator website Rotten Tomatoes, 57% of seven critics' reviews are positive, with an average rating of 4.4/10.
