= Voiceless (2015 film) =

- Theatrical release poster
- Directed by: Pat Necerato
- Written by: Pat Necerato
- Produced by: Stuart Migdon
- Starring: Rusty Joiner; Jocelyn Cruz; Victoria Gates; James Russo
- Cinematography: Joseph Hennigan
- Edited by: Jon Vasquez
- Music by: Kurt Oldman
- Production companies: American Hero Films; C3 Studios
- Distributed by: ArtEffects
- Release dates: September 2015 (NJ Northeast Film Festival); October 7, 2016
- Running time: 107 minutes
- Country: United States
- Language: English
- Box office: $419,952

Voiceless is a 2015 American Christian psychological thriller film written and directed by Pat Necerato and starring Rusty Joiner, Jocelyn Cruz, Victoria Gates, and James Russo. It was given a limited release in the United States on 7 October 2016. It was heavily panned by both critics and audiences.

== Premise ==
Jesse Dean, a young and mentally unstable war veteran, risks his marriage and new ministry job by opposing an abortion clinic in his Philadelphia neighborhood, an obsession that slowly drives him insane.

== Cast ==
- Rusty Joiner as Jesse Dean
- Jocelyn Cruz as Julia
- Victoria Gates as Alexis
- James Russo as Pastor Gil
- Paul Rodriguez as Virgil Adorable
- Susan Moses as Miss Elsie

== Production ==
Filming took place between 18 August and 30 September 2014.

== Reception ==
=== Box office ===
Opening on a hundred screens in a limited release, the film grossed about $250,000 on its opening weekend. By the end of 2016, it had grossed a total of $418,940. The film won 2 Best Feature Film Awards at the Northeastern Film Festival and the California Film Awards, along with several Best Actor Wins for Rusty Joiner, the lead, and Victoria Gates for Best Supporting Actress

=== Critical reception ===
Voiceless was universally panned by both critics and audiences. Kristian Lin of Fort Worth Weekly, in a review titled "Voiceless: Abort! Abort!", wrote that the film "has a gritty Northeastern urban setting with a modicum of nonwhite characters, and it plays with the element of doubt with its main character. If only it added up to a good movie."
