= Lisa Marie Newmyer =

American actress (born 1968)

Lisa Marie Newmyer (born August 27, 1968) is an American actress. She made her feature film debut in The Return of the Texas Chainsaw Massacre (1995), and went on to appear in several other films, such as Sin City (2005) and A Scanner Darkly (2006).

== Biography ==
Newmyer graduated from the School of Theatre at the University of the Incarnate Word in San Antonio, Texas. She made her feature film debut in The Return of the Texas Chainsaw Massacre (1995) opposite Renée Zellweger and Matthew McConaughey and directed by Kim Henkel, the writer of the 1974 original film.

In 1997, she was cast as Mona on the MTV series Austin Stories, which aired through 1998. In 2005, she had a supporting role in Frank Miller's Sin City (2005), and the following year appeared in a supporting role in Richard Linklater's sci-fi film A Scanner Darkly portraying Connie.

== Filmography ==
Year	Title	Role	Notes
1994	Heaven Help Us	Featured role	Television series
1994	The House on Todville Road	Sarah Todville	
1995	The Return of the Texas Chainsaw Massacre	Heather	
1997–1998	Austin Stories	Mona	4 episodes
1999	Crosswalk	Celia Moss	Short film
2003	Rolling Kansas	Satin	
2004	Sak 600	Nurse Allie	Short film
2005	Sin City	Tammy	
2005	A Scanner Darkly	Connie	
2008	Friday Night Lights	Ali	Episode: "It Ain't Easy Being D.J. McCoy"
