= Move This House =

Move This House is a reality television series which started airing on the A&E in 2005. Host Tanya Memme and designer Roger Hazard help homeowners who are moving and need help getting their belongings into their new homes.
