= Terror Inside =

- Original poster
- Directed by: Joe G. Lenders
- Written by: Joe G. Lenders
- Produced by: Joe G. Lenders; Flip Minott
- Starring: Corey Feldman; Tanya Memme
- Cinematography: Flip Minott
- Edited by: Joe G. Lenders
- Music by: Jason Solowsky
- Production companies: Gulfcoast Film Partners, llc
- Release date: October 31, 2008 (Fort Lauderdale International Film Festival)
- Running time: 90 minutes
- Country: United States
- Language: English

Terror Inside is a 2008 American thriller film written and directed by Jozef G. Lenders and starring Corey Feldman and Tanya Memme. It premiered at the Fort Lauderdale International Film Festival on November 3, 2008 but never received theatrical distribution.

== Plot ==
Joe Saluto, a well driller excavating geological samples for a university project in the fictional small Florida town of Montverde, is contaminated by a strange liquid that transposes his senses of pain and pleasure. Unaware he has been infected with a dangerous virus, he tries to impress Maria, a pretty waitress at the local diner, who is romantically involved with Allen Greenfield.

Allen's out-of-town job is affecting his relationship with Maria, so he decides to quit and propose to her. When he arrives in Montverde, he finds significant changes there. Maria, who earlier had hinted at marriage, now seems indifferent to it. The town is practically uninhabited and has a much darker air about it, and tattoo parlors and seedy shops have replaced the nice stores that once lined the main street. When Allen begins to investigate, he discovers the dreadful virus has forced the town people into self-mutilation.

== Cast ==
- Corey Feldman ..... Allen Greenfield
- Tanya Memme ..... Maria
- Joe Abby ..... Joe Saluto
- Susie Feldman ..... Katie
- Chad Jamian Williams ..... Office Pal

== Production ==
The film was made on location in Montverde, Florida, Fort Myers, and Cape Coral.

== Awards and nominations ==
The film won five Crystal Reel Awards presented by the Florida Motion Picture and Television Association. These included Best Feature Film Under $1 Million, Best Director (Jozef G. Lenders) of a Feature Film Under $1 Million, Best Editing (Jozef G. Lenders) of a Feature Film Under $1 Million, and Best Leading Actress (Tanya Memme) and Actor (Corey Feldman) in a Feature Film Under $1 Million.
