= The Hospital (2013 film) =

- Theatrical Movie Poster
- Directed by: Tommy Golden; Daniel Emery Taylor
- Written by: Daniel Emery Taylor; Jim O'Rear
- Produced by: Jim O'Rear
- Starring: Jim O'Rear; Jason Crowe; Robin Shute; Alicia Clark; Daniel Emery Taylor
- Cinematography: Jared Hicks
- Edited by: Tommy Golden; Jim O'Rear
- Music by: Virgil Franklin
- Production company: Deviant Pictures
- Distributed by: ITN Distribution
- Release date: February 15, 2013
- Running time: 90 minutes
- Country: United States
- Language: English
- Budget: US$10,000

The Hospital is a 2013 horror film co-directed by Tommy Golden and Daniel Emery Taylor. Having a limited US release in February 2013, the film has subsequently screened at various horror film festivals, was presented at Cannes Film Festival, and took home the "Scariest Movie" award at Germany's largest genre festival, Movie Days, in Dortmund.

== Plot summary ==
College student Beth Stratman (Constance Medrano) decides to travel to the small town of Bridgeport to do some additional research for a paper about local folklore. There are many stories about the old abandoned hospital there. The police think it is full of drug dealers and prostitutes. The locals think it is full of ghosts.

Unfortunately, they are both wrong. Beth instead finds Stanley Creech (Daniel Emery Taylor) who introduces himself as the caretaker of the grounds. She soon finds that Stanley is a psychopath, necrophiliac, and serial rapist. He holds her for several days, repeatedly raping and torturing her, leaving her no apparent means of escape.

Meanwhile, a group of hapless paranormal investigators, led by the goofs Alan (Jim O'Rear) and Jack (Jason Crowe), descend upon the property to document the alleged supernatural activity. This puts the group on a collision course with Stanley since he will do anything to keep his secret from being known. Girls begin to disappear in the night and the group learns that there is more to the story than originally thought. Both Stanley and the ghosts are just the beginning.

== Cast ==
- Jim O'Rear as Alan
- Daniel Emery Taylor as Stanley Creech
- John Dugan as Officer Chapman
- April Monique Burril as Mallory
- Jason Crowe as Jack
- Scott Tepperman as himself
- Robyn Shute as Skye
- Alicia M. Clark as Elaine
- Lauryn MacGregor as Ana
- Megan Hunt as Alyson
- Carlo Alvarez as Mark
- Melanie Contreras as Marie
- G. Larry Butler as Earl
- Christina Schimmel as Sergeant Amanda White
- Eric Branden as Jason
- Ernest Douglas Nichols as John

== Production ==
Filming began in mid 2012 in South Pittsburg, Tennessee. The directors chose to film at an abandoned hospital in the area to play off of the current popularity of 'paranormal reality' shows and give the viewer hope that they may see actual ghosts caught on camera.

== Reception ==
Mark L. Miller of Ain't It Cool News gave a mixed review of the film's violence; Miller stated that it features "some of the most depraved kills enacted upon anyone in cinematic history" HorrorNews.net panned the film, which they felt had "offensive, ill-judged, unpleasant and misogynist film making of the worst kind."

== Critical reception ==
On 19 March 2014, Tesco removed the horror film off their shelves and apologised after getting complaints for being too graphic and violent for a family store after a customer from Gloucester, England contacted the supermarket.
