= Sell This House =

American reality television series (2003–2011, 2020–2022)

- Genre: Reality
- Starring: Tanya Memme; Charlie Frattini; Daniel Kucan; Roger Hazard
- Country of origin: United States
- Original language: English
- No. of seasons: 10
- No. of episodes: 203

Production
- Executive producers: Jordan Harman; Christian Murphy
- Camera setup: Multi-camera
- Production company: Six West Media

Original release
- Network: A&E (seasons 1–9, 11); FYI (seasons 10–11)
- Release: July 6, 2003 – January 22, 2022

Sell This House is an American reality television series that premiered July 6, 2003 on A&E and May 18, 2020, on FYI. Host Tanya Memme and home stagers/interior designers Roger Hazard and Daniel Kucan help homeowners who are having trouble selling their houses. For its ninth season, the show's name was changed to Sell This House: Extreme and the format expanded to one hour, with the materials budget increased from $2,000 to $20,000. Construction expert Charlie Frattini and designer Daniel Kucan joined the cast after Hazard departed the show.

== Premise ==
=== 2003–2011 ===
In seasons 1–9, cameras were set up to record prospective buyers' reactions in a one-day open house, followed by Memme showing and discussing the comments with the homeowners. Afterward, Hazard makes his evaluation. He, Memme, the sellers, and their friends and family then work to stage the house, fixing, minimizing or hiding any problems he has found, working with a budget of a few hundred dollars. This generally involves redesigning the landscaping, painting, removing excess clutter and personal items and staging furnishings without making structural changes to the house. Finally, the same potential buyers are brought back for a second walkthrough.

=== 2020–2022 ===
In May 2020, A+E Networks announced the series would be returning for its tenth season after a nearly nine-year hiatus. Season 10 premiered on May 18, 2020, on FYI and many free streaming services. The latest season focuses on houses that have been sitting on the market for more than 100 days. Memme starts by conducting an open house to get feedback from buyers, before working with a local designer to transform the homes. After relisting the homes online and conducting a new round of open house inspections, viewers see the transformation, hear prospective buyer feedback, and find out for what price the home listed and if it sold.

== Series overview ==
Season	Episodes	Originally aired	
Season	Episodes	First aired	Last aired
1	26	July 6, 2003	May 1, 2004
2	26	July 11, 2004	February 13, 2005
3	23	April 3, 2005	January 29, 2006
4	33	March 12, 2006	July 21, 2007
5	33	July 28, 2007	June 28, 2008
6	16	August 2, 2008	December 20, 2008
7	13	April 25, 2009	August 29, 2009
8	23	April 3, 2010	November 20, 2010
9	10	March 19, 2011	August 6, 2011
10	20	May 18, 2020	May 10, 2021
11	20	May 17, 2021	January 22, 2022
