= Home staging =

Preparing a private residence for sale

Room before and after staging
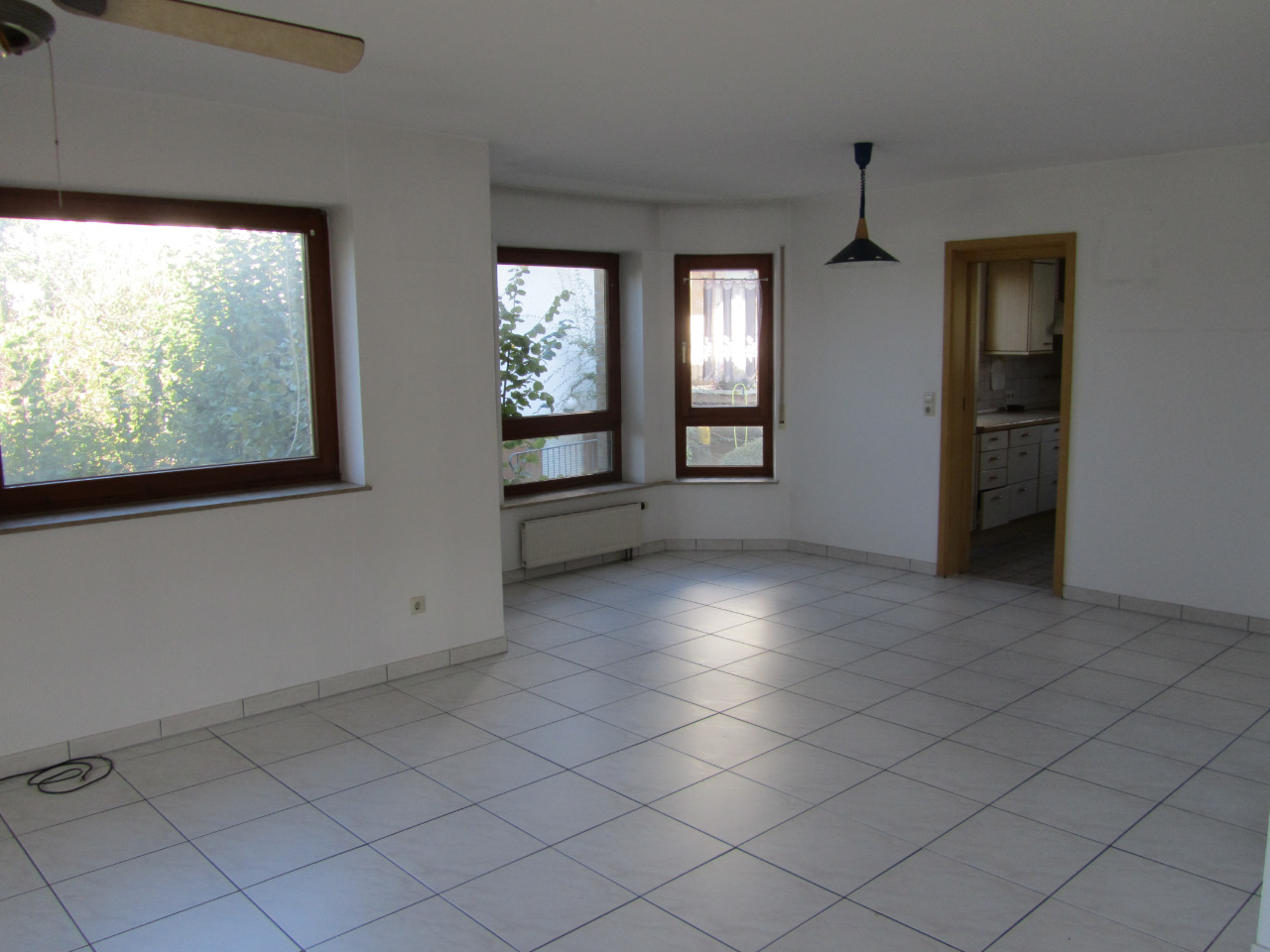
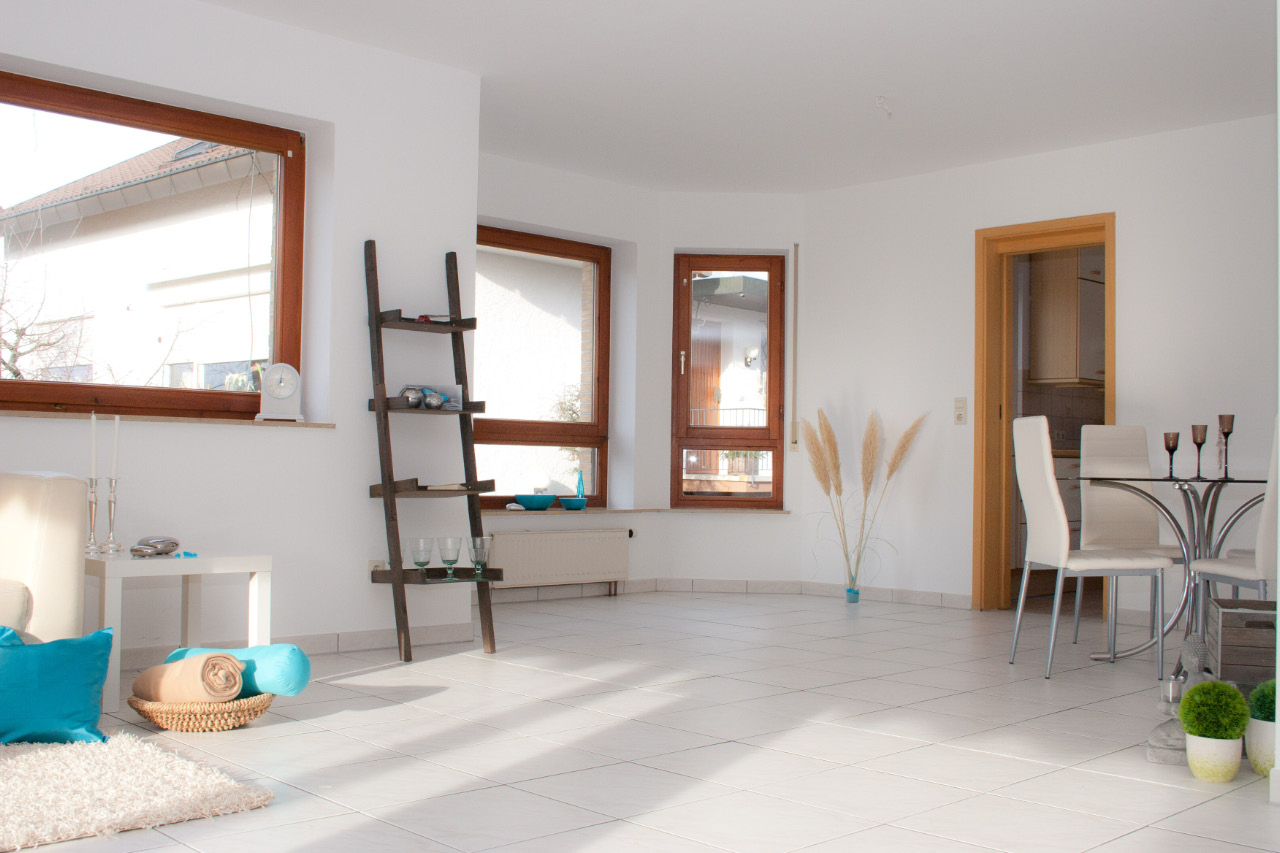

Home staging is the preparation of a private residence for sale in the real estate marketplace. The goal of staging is to make a home appealing to the highest number of potential buyers, thereby selling a property more swiftly and for more money. Staging techniques focus on improving a property's appeal by ensuring it is a welcoming, attractive product that any buyer can see themself living in and, thus, desire to purchase.

Staging requires a monetary investment into selling what are some people's greatest investment: their home and property. So it is not just decorating, but also needs to include an understanding of how to find the equity in that home and property, where the real estate market is for that home, in that neighborhood, so the homeowner can choose where to make those investments. Comparable houses for sale on the market in the area also need to be considered to know how to stage the home so it sells quickly and for more money. Return on investment is the purpose of staging.

As for simple decorating to stage, people often use art, painting, accessories, lights, greenery, and carpet to stage the home, to give potential buyers a more attractive first impression of the property. They also rearrange or "temporarily replace" furniture. Properly executed staging leads the eye to attractive features, while down-playing flaws. Different areas and rooms of a home can have varying levels of impact when convincing potential homebuyers, and therefore some rooms can be considered more important than others when it comes to staging.

Home staging is not without controversy: "rattled" was a New York Times-cited reaction by a writer with a library room being told that "More than 50 percent of shelf space devoted to books equals clutter."

== History ==
=== Sweden ===
In Sweden, professional home staging, known as homestyling, became popular after 2000. Professional home stagers claim homestyling yields around 10% higher pricing compared to just cleaning the home.

=== UK ===
In Britain, home staging is sometimes referred to as property presentation or property styling. The techniques were televised by home stylist Ann Maurice in the show House Doctor on Five for six years. and popularized the alternate description "house doctoring." Her follow-up show is named House Doctor: Inside And Out.

=== U.S. ===
The New York Times described the seller's situation as "... not always happily, in the company of unfamiliar sofas ... tables ..." while some of what they own is placed in temporary storage. However, U.S. research states that home staging can reduce a listing's time on the market by one third to half, and could fetch as much as 6% to 20% more than an empty home or a home not properly staged.

The pricing is not just for a one time dollar amount; high-end fees can be "$3,000 a month" (part of which is for renting replacement furniture).

The practice of home staging has long elicited strong reactions. Agents and professional stagers point to examples like the Sarro-Waite apartment, and say staging can usually help a home sell faster, and for a higher price, offering a larger return on the investment. There is criticism on the fact that buyers will have to pay more for nothing, the furniture is not part of the sales.

One 2018 professional view is that it is five years past simple decluttering and some light painting. Home staging services have sizable inventories of alternative chairs, current accessories, and even pillows, blankets, and towels. A decade prior, the simple view was that sellers believed in paid-for-staging, since it raised property values by reducing the home's perceived flaws. More recent changes now include depersonalizing, improving overall condition and even landscaping. For vacant homes, prop or staging furniture is used to create a living space where the buyer can imagine themselves living and also better understand the sizes of rooms.

Prices for initial consultation and monthly follow-up fees vary by region and by the size of the property (including number of rooms).

== Television shows ==
- Designed to Sell
- Flipping Out
- House Doctor
- Sell This House
- The Stagers

== See also ==
- Virtual staging
