= Virtual home staging =

Graphic editing for realistic property visuals

Virtual home staging is a type of home staging in which an interior design is created in a graphic editor. Virtual staging is especially popular among real estate brokers, photographers, and interior designers. The main goal of this kind of visualization is creating highly realistic images of properties (usually for sale). The major advantages of virtual staging over traditional home staging are time and cost; virtual staging is more than 90% cheaper than physical home staging.

Virtual staging is sometimes done to market a vacant home, as it can offer many of the benefits of traditional staging at a significantly lower cost. About five to ten percent of online real estate listings use virtual staging.

Algorithms of data analysis that scan millions of images on the Internet and evaluate them according to views and likes on social networks help to create interior and decor models for the virtual staging process.
