= Beverly Lane =

- Directed by: Joshua Hull
- Written by: Joshua Hull
- Produced by: Jim Dougherty; Joshua Hull
- Starring: Jim O'Rear; Noah East; Raymond Kester; Donald A. Becker; James Copeland; Mark A. Nash
- Cinematography: Jim Dougherty
- Edited by: Jim Dougherty
- Music by: Noah East; Aaron M. Esche; Virgil Franklin; Frankie Hull
- Distributed by: 3 O'clock Pictures; Arsonist Pictures
- Release dates: October 29, 2010 (Noblesville, Indiana)
- Running time: 69 minutes
- Country: United States
- Language: English
- Budget: $1200

Beverly Lane is 2010 comedy horror written and directed by Joshua Hull. It stars Jim O'Rear, Noah East, Raymond Kester, Donald A. Becker, James Copeland, and Mark A. Nash. East plays an office worker who must defend himself against zombies, unhelpful co-workers, and annoying party entertainers.

== Plot ==
On his first day at a new job at a local metal company, Andy attends the boring retirement party of a manager. The party includes clowns, mimes, and magicians, all of whom are eccentric and annoy the office workers, who are soon put into an even worse situation when zombies attack the building.

== Cast ==
- Jim O'Rear as Adam Cadabra
- Noah East as Andy
- Raymond Kester as Terry
- Donald A. Becker as Steve
- James Copeland as Ronnie
- Mark A. Nash as Scotty
- Martin Stapleton as Bübbles The English Clown

== Production ==
Beverly Lane was financed entirely by director Joshua Hull and producer/co-star Jim Dougherty. The film was shot in four days, and they needed to shoot 20 pages a day in order to stay on schedule. Jim O'Rear heard about the film and joined about a month prior to filming. The film was originally envisioned as a web series, but they decided that the story was better suited to a feature film. The first day of filming was March 13, 2010, and it included use of local Indiana locations, such as a scrap yard.

== Release ==
On October 29, 2010, Beverly Lane premiered in Noblesville, Indiana. It included a costume contest and prizes. It was released on DVD October 25, 2011. It also played at Gen Con in 2011.

== Reception ==
Mark L. Miller of Ain't It Cool News wrote, "I must admit some of the deliveries are amateurish, but as I said above this film has a fun spirit, keeps things darkly humorous throughout, and is actually a lot of fun to watch as long as you aren't expecting an Oscar-winning film."

=== Awards ===
Beverly Lane won Best Horror Film at the GIF Festival and five Golden Cob awards, including Best Emerging Filmmaker for Hull.
