= Leonard Maltin's Movie Guide =

Book by Leonard Maltin

- Cover of the 2010 edition
- Author: Leonard Maltin
- Language: English
- Subject: Film reviews, synopses
- Publication place: United States

Leonard Maltin's Movie Guide was a book-format collection of movie capsule reviews that began in 1969, was updated biannually after 1978, and then annually after 1986. The final edition was published in September 2014. It was originally called TV Movies, which became Leonard Maltin's TV Movies and Video Guide, and then Leonard Maltin's Movie and Video Guide, before arriving at its final title. Film critic Leonard Maltin edited it and contributed a large portion of its reviews.

== Features ==
The book used a star rating system. The lowest rating was "BOMB", followed by one and a half stars, rising in half-star increments to a maximum of four stars, and frequently giving out two-and-a-half star (**1/2) reviews. The sole exception to this was Naked Gun 33 1/3: The Final Insult, which was rated with two and one third stars out of four, referencing the film's title.

Maltin did not cover direct-to-video films because of their great number (six released each week by 1994). Made-for-television films were included in the guides for many years, though in the late 1990s, Maltin gradually began to phase them out to make room for current feature film releases. All had been removed by the early 2010s, and no TV movies made after 2004 were included in new editions. Maltin used a different system for rating TV movies: "Below average", "Average" or "Above average", with select variants for highly rated films, including "Way above average" for The Day After and the Emmy Award-winning Special Bulletin (each from 1983), and "Outstanding" for Minstrel Man (1977). Certain theatrically-released films (usually low budget, obscure, foreign, concert, or serial films), as well as the majority of films based on Edgar Wallace novels, were also removed from the guide over time to allow the inclusion of new titles.

Another notable feature of the Guide was that each review included a reference to the source material for the film if it was based on previously published material. Films were listed alphabetically letter-by-letter, ignoring punctuation and spaces. Articles were also ignored and transposed to the end of the title.

The Guide was notable for containing what the Guinness Book of World Records calls the world's shortest movie review. His 2 out of 4 star review of the 1948 musical Isn't It Romantic? consisted of the word "No". Another very short review concerned the film Scooby-Doo 2: Monsters Unleashed where Maltin wrote, "It is what it is." Yet another was of Are Husbands Necessary? which asked the rhetorical question, "And what about this film?", and one more right behind these is Police Academy 4: Citizens on Patrol where, in comparing it to the previous installments, he commented, "More of the same, only worse."

=== Bombs ===
Along with typically listed worst pictures of all time, the hundreds of films Maltin designated as a "BOMB" in his guide also included the following: American Gigolo, the Woody Allen-directed Anything Else, Ballistic: Ecks vs. Sever, Battlefield Earth, The Benchwarmers, Best of the Best, Bobby Deerfield, The Bonfire of the Vanities, The Cannonball Run, Cannonball Run II, Captain Ron, Celtic Pride, College, Cop and a Half, Delgo, Driven, The Dukes of Hazzard, 88 Minutes, Endless Love, Every Which Way but Loose, Fatal Beauty, Fear and Loathing in Las Vegas, Four Rooms, Freddy Got Fingered, The Garbage Pail Kids Movie, Grease 2, 2010's Gulliver's Travels, Howard the Duck, 1980's Jazz Singer, The Karate Kid Part III, Little Man, Mame, Mannequin, The Missouri Breaks, the 1980 adaptation of Popeye, Prêt-à-Porter, 1998's remake of Psycho, Silent Night, Deadly Night, 2007's remake of Sleuth, Street Fighter, 3000 Miles to Graceland, Valley of the Dolls, Van Helsing, 1985's Water, Year One, and Your Highness.

== History ==
High-school senior Leonard Maltin was publisher of Film Fan Monthly. In spring 1968 a teacher introduced him to an editor at Signet Books, which wanted a competitor to Steven H. Scheuer's Movies on TV; impressed by Maltin's ideas for the book the editor hired him immediately, without telling others that he had hired a 17-year-old. The first edition of Maltin's book, originally called TV Movies, appeared in September 1969 featuring 8,000 of the 14,000 films available for television at the time and contained 535 pages, including 32 pages of photos. Unlike Scheuer's book at the time, TV Movies included the movie's director, running time and larger cast lists.

A second edition appeared five years later. After a third in 1978, new editions appeared every two years, and after 1986 every year. Maltin's regular appearance on Entertainment Tonight from 1982 and the rise of home video and cable television saw an increase in sales of the book.

In 2005, the logistical problems of a single book prompted him to launch a companion volume, Leonard Maltin's Classic Movie Guide, restricted to films from 1960 and earlier, several of which no longer appeared in the annual publication (some had been deleted over the years to make room for newer films, others removed at this point because the additional title permitted it) and many others that never had. The latter category included the "complete" (according to Maltin's introduction) Saturday matinee cowboy programmers of John Wayne, William "Hopalong Cassidy" Boyd, Gene Autry, and Roy Rogers. The second edition of the Classic Movie Guide, published in 2010, moved the cut-off date to 1965. With the 2013 edition, the annual Movie Guide was subtitled The Modern Era.

Maltin announced in August 2014 that the 2015 edition, to be published in September 2014, would be the last:

An entire generation has been raised to acquire all their information online from their mobile devices or computers. These are not the likely customers for a physical paperback reference book. Our sales have sharply declined in recent years.

== Editors ==
In addition to Maltin, the final edition listed the following contributing editors:

- Darwyn Carson - Managing editor
- Luke Sader - Associated editor
- Mike Clark
- Rob Edelman
- Spencer Green
- Pete Hammond
- Joe Leydon
- Michael Scheinfeld
- Bill Warren
- Casey St Charnez - video editor

Earlier contributing editors included John Cocchi, Alvin H Marill and Maltin's wife, Alice.

== Electronic versions ==
In 1992, the Movie Guide was released on CD-ROM as part of Microsoft Cinemania. In 1994 it was released separately on CD-ROM. Cinemania was discontinued in 1997.

A mobile application version of the Guide was released, in 2009, to the App Store. However, the app was taken down in 2014 due to Penguin Group being unable to come to an agreement with Mobile Age, the creator of the app.

== Other similar guides ==
Besides Scheuer's Movies on TV, similar books include Halliwell's Film Guide, by Leslie Halliwell, and The Good Film and Video Guide, by David Shipman. Scheuer's guide was the first published, in 1958, preceding Maltin's by ten years, and the two were competing titles until the early 1990s. Scheuer's books had a similar format to Maltin's, except with more listings for made-for-television productions.

== See also ==
- Turner Classic Movies
- Entertainment Tonight
- Mystery Science Theater 3000
