= Joe Leydon =

American film critic and historian

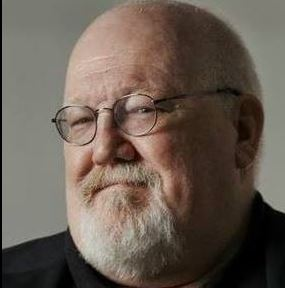
- Born: Joseph Patrick Michael Leydon; August 22, 1952 (age 74); New Orleans, Louisiana, U.S.
- Education: Loyola University
- Occupations: Film critic, historian

Joseph Patrick Michael Leydon (born August 22, 1952) is an American film critic and historian who is senior entertainment editor for Cowboys & Indians Magazine.. A critic and correspondent for Variety since 1990, he is the author of Joe Leydon's Guide to Essential Movies You Must See (Michael Wiese Productions), and was a contributing critic for Leonard Maltin's Movie Guide. As of July 2021 he has 1225 reviews collected on the website Rotten Tomatoes. He is also a founding member of Houston Film Critics Society, and a voting member of Critics Choice.

== Life and career ==
Leydon was born in New Orleans, Louisiana and raised in the city's Ninth Ward. He graduated from Loyola University with a degree in journalism (with a minor in film). At Loyola, he studied under the late Ralph T. Bell. In 2007, he earned a Master of Arts degree at the Jack J. Valenti School of Communication at University of Houston.

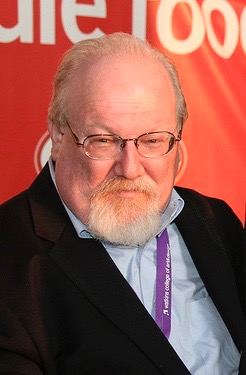
Leydon at the Nashville Film Festival in 2008

Leydon was a film critic for the Houston Post from 1982 until the paper’s demise in 1995. He has also reviewed films for The Houston Press, The San Francisco Examiner, MSNBC.com, and NBC affiliate KPRC-TV in Houston. His work as a journalist, interviewer, and feature writer has appeared in the New York Daily News, Los Angeles Times, Newsday, The Tennessean, The Boston Globe, Toronto Star, and the Austin American-Statesman; Film Comment, MovieMaker, Houstonia, and New Orleans magazines. From 2001 until 2021, Leydon taught film and communication studies courses at Houston Community College and the Jack J. Valenti School of Communication at University of Houston.

In a December 17, 2011 post on his blog, Leydon revealed that he had been diagnosed with prostate cancer in 2009, and that he had survived treatment and was in remission.
