= Mike Clark (critic) =

American film critic (1947–2020)

Mike Clark also known as Movie Mike (1947 – July 31, 2020, in Reston, Virginia) was an American film critic for USA Today from 1985 until 2009, and a member of the National Society of Film Critics. He was also a contributing editor to Leonard Maltin's Movie Guide. At age 10, he won $16,000 on The $64,000 Question. He graduated from New York University's Graduate School of Cinema and became film critic for the Detroit Free Press. He was a director/programme planner of the American Film Institute Theater in Washington, D.C. and later for the John F. Kennedy Center for the Performing Arts and also assistant manager/concierge at the Angelika Mosaic Film Center & Cafe in Fairfax, Virginia. After leaving USA Today he wrote a weekly column called "Mike's Picks" for Home Media Magazine

== Death ==
On July 31, 2020, Clark died aged 73 at a hospital in Reston, Virginia while having a head injury which led to bleeding around the brain after a fall on July 27, and after battling liver disease for years.
