= Dust of Life (2006 film) =

- Original movie poster
- Directed by: Le-Van Kiet
- Written by: Le-Van Kiet
- Produced by: Kim Viet Ngo (producer); William Eubank and Eric Graff (co-producers)
- Cinematography: Jason Inouye
- Music by: Jason Solowsky
- Distributed by: Coco Paris LLC
- Release date: March 30, 2006
- Running time: 90 minutes
- Country: United States
- Languages: English; Vietnamese

Dust of Life, also known in Vietnamese as Bui Doi, is a 2006 film by director Le-Van Kiet, who also wrote the screenplay.

== Plot ==
Since 1975 millions of Vietnamese boat people have fled for freedom. By 1993 more than half who survived the exodus resided in California. The film portrays the coming of age story of abandoned kids growing up in the new Vietnamese enclave of Orange County, California in the early 1990s, based on true events.

== Cast ==
- Devon Duy Nguyen—Johnny
- Thu-Mai Tran—Mai
- England DuVan—Rascal
- Mai Khanh—Mai’s Mother
- Linh Le—Quynh
- Liem Michael Doan—Father Michael
- Dang Hung Son—Mai's father

== Festivals ==
The film also showed at the Vietnamese International Film Festival in 2011
