= Jim O'Rear =

American actor

Jim O’Rear
- Born: September 28, 1967 (age 58); Cordova, Alabama, USA
- Website: http://www.jimorear.com

Jim O'Rear is an American actor, screenwriter, and director.

== Career ==
O’Rear began his professional career working on stage with magicians including David Copperfield and Harry Blackstone, Jr. He then trained as an actor at The American Academy of Dramatic Arts in New York.

In addition to acting and writing screenplays, O'Rear has written for Scary Monsters Magazine, Haunted Attraction Magazine, Comics Interview, and Underground Entertainment, and has been recognized in Fangoria.

O'Rear was one of several actors selected to appear in a set of horror movie trading cards with other genre actors including Debbie Rochon, Ben Chapman, and Gunnar Hansen. In 2010, O'Rear was turned into an action figure as his Beverly Lane zombie film character.

O'Rear works as an actor, stuntman, and screenwriter and recently appeared in The Dead Matter, with Andrew Divoff, Tom Savini, and Jason Carter and The Hospital with John Dugan, Daniel Emery Taylor, Scott Tepperman, and April Burril.

O'Rear is also a member of The Hollywood Ghost Hunters. 2014 starred in the American Giallo film Three Tears on Bloodstained Flesh and in the Anthology film Volumes of Blood.
