= Tanya Memme =

Canadian actress and television host

- Born: Tanya Lynn Memme; June 15, 1971 (age 53); Wainfleet, Ontario, Canada
- Occupation(s): Actress, television presenter
- Years active: 1997–present
- Spouse: Vahan Yepremyan (m. 2010; div. 2015)
- Children: Ava (b. 2011)
- Website: http://www.tanyamemme.com

Tanya Lynn Memme (born June 15, 1971) is a Canadian actress, television host and beauty pageant titleholder.

== Early life ==
Born in Wainfleet, Ontario, Memme went to Denis Morris Catholic High School in St. Catharines. In 1993, she was crowned Miss World Canada (part of the Miss World system).

== Career ==
Memme is best known for hosting the American television series Sell This House, which aired on A&E (2003–2011) and FYI (2020–2022).

For three seasons, Memme was a regular contributor as a DIY crafter, and 'family member', on the Hallmark Channel's daily show, Home & Family. She also hosted Move This House and has been a correspondent for Global TV's Entertainment Tonight Canada. In Los Angeles, she was a co-host of Channel 9's 9 On The Town series in 2004. She appeared in commercials for TVG, the horse racing network, and represented DirecTV in a number of customer education segments.

As an actress, Memme has made appearances on the television programs JAG, Melrose Place, The Practice, Robotica and CSI: Miami. In 2008, she was awarded the Best Leading Actress in a Feature Film Under $1 Million Crystal Reel Award by the Florida Motion Picture and Television Association for her starring role in Terror Inside.

Memme has appeared on many talk shows including The View and was interviewed in the documentary Being Canadian. She has been featured in numerous magazine and newspaper articles in the United States and Canada.

== Personal life ==
In 2010, Memme married film producer Vahan Yepremyan. The couple had one daughter, Ava, born the following year. They divorced in 2015.

Preceded by Nina Khilji	Miss World Canada; 1993	Succeeded by Shawna Roberts
