= Rusty Joiner =

American actor and model

- Born: Jason Russell Joiner; December 11, 1972 (age 53); Montgomery, Alabama, U.S.
- Education: Georgia Southern University
- Occupations: Model; actor; producer
- Years active: 1998–present
- Spouse: Charity Walden Joiner (m. 2008)
- Children: 3
- Modeling information
- Height: 5 ft 11 in (1.80 m)
- Hair color: Blonde
- Eye color: Blue
- Website: rustyjoiner.com

Jason Russell "Rusty" Joiner (born December 11, 1972) is an American male fashion model, fitness model and actor.

== Early life and education ==
Born in Montgomery, Alabama, and raised in Atlanta, Georgia, Joiner attended Georgia Southern University, where he was a successful athlete and cheerleader for four years. He is also a former gym instructor.

== Career ==
=== Modelling ===
He was discovered by a model scout in Atlanta and spent the next several years modelling in Milan, Paris, and South America. He has modeled for Prada, Abercrombie and Fitch, American Eagle, Levi's and Powerade. Joiner won the Structure Underwear Model Search, and became the official underwear model for Structure from 1998 to 2000. He has appeared on the covers and pages of Vanity Fair, Cosmopolitan, Rolling Stone, and Men's Fitness. The February 2005 Men's Fitness cover was his eleventh for the magazine in five years.

Joiner also appeared in RuPaul's video Looking Good, Feeling Gorgeous.

=== Acting and Film Production ===
He has appeared as "Blade" with Ben Stiller and Vince Vaughn in Dodgeball: A True Underdog Story (2004), and in Russell Mulcahy's Resident Evil: Extinction (2007) with Milla Jovovich.

== Filmography ==
=== Film ===
Year	Title	Role	Notes
2004	Dodgeball: A True Underdog Story	Blade	
2006	Idol	Actor	
2007	Resident Evil: Extinction	Eddie	
2009	Absolute Evil: Final Exit	Cooper Lee Baines	
2009	Bring It On: Fight to the Finish	E.M.T. #1 (uncredited)	Direct-to-video
2012	Stuck in Love	Martin	
2012	Last Ounce of Courage	Greg Rogers	
2013	Dragonfyre	John Norton	
2013	Four Senses	Mark	
2014	Unsullied	Noah	
2014	Behaving Badly	Keith Bender	
2015	Voiceless	Jesse	
2016	Amateur Night	Cocky dude	
2016	Sam Was Here	Sam Cobritz	
2021	Spider-Man : No Way Home	Spiderman	
2018	Almost Perfect	Isaac Feldman	
2018	Silver Lake	Kenny	
TBA	To Have and to Hold	John Rolfe	

=== Television ===
Year	Title	Role	Notes
2000	Spin City	Man in store	Episode: "All the Wrong Moves"
2004	CSI: Miami	Pretty blonde boy	Episode: "Rap Sheet"
2004	Dr. Vegas	Ronny	Episode: "Dead Man, Live Bet"
2004	ER	Rock-climbing instructor Brett	Episode: "Shot in the Dark"
2005	Bones	Charlie	Episode: "The Man in the Bear"
2007	Close to Home	Matthew Toobin	Episode: "Maternal Instinct"
2007	The Closer	Danny Jones	Episode: "Manhunt"
2009	Days of Our Lives	Kevin	2 episodes
2010	Melrose Place	Magnus Balack	2 episodes
2018	My Teacher, My Obsession	Chris	Television film
2019	Criminal Minds	Mark Zabel	Episode: "Truth or Dare"
2019	A Daughter's Deception	Michael Parker	Television film

== See also ==
- List of male underwear models
