= The Texas Chainsaw Massacre (franchise) =

American horror franchise

- Logo for the Platinum Dunes films
- Created by: Kim Henkel; Tobe Hooper
- Original work: The Texas Chain Saw Massacre (1974)
- Owner: Vortex Inc.
- Years: 1974–present

Print publications
- Book: Chain Saw Confidential (2013)
- Novel: The Texas Chainsaw Massacre (2004)
- Comics: List of comics

Films and television
- Films: List of films

Games
- Video games: The Texas Chainsaw Massacre (1983); The Texas Chain Saw Massacre (2023)

The Texas Chainsaw Massacre is an American slasher franchise created by Kim Henkel and Tobe Hooper. It consists of nine films, comics, a novel, and two video game adaptations. The franchise focuses on the cannibalistic spree killer Leatherface (who uses a chainsaw as his signature weapon) and his family, who terrorize unsuspecting visitors to their territories in the desolate Texas countryside, typically killing and subsequently cooking them. The film series has grossed over $252 million at the worldwide box office.

== Films ==
Film	U.S. release date	Director(s)	Screenwriter(s)	Story by	Producer(s)
The Texas Chain Saw Massacre	October 11, 1974	Tobe Hooper	Kim Henkel and Tobe Hooper	Kim Henkel and Tobe Hooper	Tobe Hooper
The Texas Chainsaw Massacre 2	August 22, 1986	Tobe Hooper	L.M. Kit Carson	L.M. Kit Carson	Menahem Golan and Yoram Globus
Leatherface: The Texas Chainsaw Massacre III	January 12, 1990	Jeff Burr	David J. Schow	David J. Schow	Robert Engelman
The Return of the Texas Chainsaw Massacre	September 22, 1995	Kim Henkel	Kim Henkel	Kim Henkel	Kim Henkel and Robert Kuhn
The Texas Chainsaw Massacre	October 17, 2003	Marcus Nispel	Scott Kosar	Scott Kosar	Michael Bay and Mike Fleiss
The Texas Chainsaw Massacre: The Beginning	October 6, 2006	Jonathan Liebesman	Sheldon Turner	Sheldon Turner and David J. Schow	Michael Bay, Mike Fleiss, Kim Henkel, Tobe Hooper, Brad Fuller, and Andrew Form
Texas Chainsaw 3D	January 4, 2013	John Luessenhop	Adam Marcus, Debra Sullivan, and Kristen Ellis	Stephen Susco, Adam Marcus and Debra Sullivan	Carl Mazzocone
Leatherface	October 20, 2017	Julien Maury and Alexandre Bustillo	Seth M. Sherwood	Seth M. Sherwood	Christa Campbell, Lati Grobman, Carl Mazzocone, and Les Weldon
Texas Chainsaw Massacre	February 18, 2022	David Blue Garcia	Chris Thomas Devlin	Fede Álvarez and Rodo Sayagues	Fede Álvarez, Herbert W. Gains, Kim Henkel, Ian Henkel, and Pat Cassidy
Untitled film	TBA	Curry Barker	Curry Barker	TBA	Roy Lee, Steven Schneider, Stuart Manashil, Pat Cassidy, Ian Henkel, and Kim Henkel

The Texas Chainsaw Massacre story chronology
Original continuity
- The Texas Chain Saw Massacre (1974)
- The Texas Chainsaw Massacre 2 (1986)
- Leatherface: The Texas Chainsaw Massacre III (1990)
- The Return of the Texas Chainsaw Massacre (1995)
Platinum Dunes' remake continuity
- The Texas Chainsaw Massacre: The Beginning (2006)
- The Texas Chainsaw Massacre (2003)
Millennium Films' alternate continuity
- Leatherface (2017)
- The Texas Chain Saw Massacre (1974)
- Texas Chainsaw 3D (2013)
Legendary Pictures' alternate continuity (Note: The Texas Chainsaw Massacre 2 and Texas Chainsaw Massacre (2022) are explicitly continuous with the original 1974 film, though not necessarily with one another.)
- The Texas Chain Saw Massacre (1974)
- Texas Chainsaw Massacre (2022) (Note: The film is a sequel to The Texas Chain Saw Massacre (1974) set fifty years later. Producer and story writer Fede Álvarez clarified that the film does not outright erase Part 2: "When movies do that, sometimes it feels a bit disrespectful to all the other films. Some people love Texas Chainsaw 2. But the rest is such a mess canon-wise. I think it's up to you to decide when and how the events of the other movies happen".)

The Texas Chain Saw Massacre, released in 1974, written and directed by Tobe Hooper, was the first and most successful entry in the series. It is considered to be the first of the 1970s slasher films, and originated a great many of the clichés seen in countless later low-budget slashers. Its plot concerns a family of cannibals living in rural Texas, who abduct customers from their gas station. The film's most notable character, Leatherface, is one of the most well-known villains in cinema history, notable for his masks made of human skin, his blood-soaked butcher's apron and the chainsaw he wields. Although the film is marketed as a true story, it does not depict actual events, and is instead (as with the film Psycho) inspired by notorious killer Ed Gein, who acted alone and did not use a chainsaw.

The Texas Chainsaw Massacre 2 (1986) is set 13 years after the events of the first film. Although it managed to recoup its relatively small budget, the film was not considered a financial success. Since its initial release, however, it has developed a cult following of its own. Unlike its predecessor, which combined minimal gore with a documentary-style nature, the sequel is a comedic horror film, filled with black humour and various gore effects created by make-up maestro Tom Savini. The film features an appearance by novelist Kinky Friedman as well as film critic Joe Bob Briggs. Briggs' cameo appearance was originally cut in editing, but was restored for the director's cut version of the film when it was released on DVD.

Leatherface: The Texas Chainsaw Massacre III is a 1990 follow-up to the previous two films. It stars Kate Hodge, Ken Foree, and Viggo Mortensen and was directed by Jeff Burr. At the time, this was considered to be the first of several sequels in the series to be produced by New Line Cinema, but was not a commercial success, and New Line had no further involvement in the series.

The Return of the Texas Chainsaw Massacre (1995) is the fourth film in the original series. It received a limited release in 1995 through Columbia Pictures, and was given a limited re-release in 1997 under the new title Texas Chainsaw Massacre: The Next Generation in hopes of capitalizing on the elevated public profiles of stars Renée Zellweger and Matthew McConaughey in the wake of their 1996 films Jerry Maguire and A Time to Kill respectively.

The 2003 remake, The Texas Chainsaw Massacre, directed by Marcus Nispel, written by Scott Kosar and produced by Michael Bay, is based on the events of the first film, but for the most part, it follows a different storyline. A major difference between the two films, for example, is that rather than picking up Leatherface's psychotic hitchhiker brother, the group instead come upon a traumatized survivor who shoots herself in their van. The film gives Leatherface's background, a real name (Thomas Brown Hewitt), as well as a possible reason for his wearing masks, namely a skin disease which has caused his nose to rot away. The remake received a generally negative critical response upon release, but was financially successful enough to lead to a prequel, The Texas Chainsaw Massacre: The Beginning (2006), which takes place in 1969. Directed by Jonathan Liebesman, written by Sheldon Turner and produced by Michael Bay, it explores the roots of Leatherface's family and delves into their past. Leatherface's first mask is featured, as well as the first murder he commits using a chainsaw. It grossed less than its predecessor and has received a more negative reception from film critics.

The seventh film, Texas Chainsaw 3D (2013), is a direct sequel to the original 1974 film, and makes no reference to the events of the other sequels. The film was directed by John Luessenhop, and written by Adam Marcus, Kirsten Elms, and Debra Sullivan. Texas Chainsaw follows a young girl named Heather, who is travelling to Texas with her friends to collect an inheritance from her deceased grandmother, whom she had never met. There, Heather discovers that she is part of the Sawyer family, who were killed by the townspeople following the events of the 1974 film, as well as a cousin of Leatherface. According to Seth M. Sherwood, writer of the prequel Leatherface (2017), the eighth film is part of a continuity that consists of Leatherface, The Texas Chain Saw Massacre (1974), and Texas Chainsaw 3D.

Following the release of Leatherface, the producers had the rights to make five more Texas Chainsaw Massacre films. Producer Christa Campbell stated that the fate of the potential films would largely depend on the financial reception and perceived fan reactions regarding the 2017 prequel. Lionsgate and Millennium Films lost the franchise rights in December the same year due to the time it took to release it. Legendary Entertainment subsequently acquired the franchise's rights with interest in developing television and film projects.

The ninth film, Texas Chainsaw Massacre, takes place 50 years after the events of the original Texas Chain Saw Massacre. The film stars Sarah Yarkin, Elsie Fisher, Moe Dunford, Nell Hudson, Jessica Allain, Olwen Fouéré, Jacob Latimore, and Alice Krige. In addition, Mark Burnham portrays an older Leatherface, replacing Gunnar Hansen, while Olwen Fouéré plays Sally Hardesty, replacing Marilyn Burns. Original directors, Ryan and Andy Tohill, were fired a week into filming and were replaced with David Blue Garcia. Chris Thomas Devlin wrote the screenplay with the story by Fede Álverez and Rodo Sayagues. The film skipped a theatrical release and was instead released on Netflix, on February 18, 2022. The film received mostly negative reviews.

=== Future ===
A bidding war for future rights was underway, with many studios and creatives in mind. These included a film directed and co-written by Bryan Bertino and produced by Oz Perkins for Neon, a television series developed by JT Mollner and Glen Powell and produced by Roy Lee for A24, a film also produced by Lee for Netflix, and Taylor Sheridan producing for Paramount. Jordan Peele's Monkeypaw Productions had also been involved in the bidding war but left early on. In September 2025, A24 emerged as the front runner, with the Netflix film also happening; the former ultimately acquired film and television rights to the franchise in February 2026, though distribution for the film previously set at Netflix remains in question. On April 21, 2026, it was announced that Curry Barker is set to write and direct the planned untitled tenth film with A24.

== Recurring cast and characters ==
List indicators
- This table only shows characters that have appeared in three or more films in the series.
- A dark grey cell indicates that the character was not in the film or that the character's presence in the film has yet to be announced.
- An ^{A} indicates an appearance through archival footage or stills.
- A ^{C} indicates a cameo role.

Character	Appearances								
Character	TCM (1974)	TCM 2	Leatherface: TCM III	The Return of TCM	TCM (2003 remake)	TCM: The Beginning	TC 3D	Leatherface (2017 prequel)	TCM (2022 sequel)
Leatherface	Gunnar Hansen	Bill Johnson	R. A. Mihailoff	Robert Jacks	Andrew Bryniarski	Andrew Bryniarski	Dan Yeager	Sam Strike	Mark Burnham
Grandfather	John Dugan	Ken Evert		Grayson Victor Schirmacher			John Dugan	Eduard Parsehyan	
Sally Hardesty	Marilyn Burns	Mentioned	Mentioned	Marilyn Burns^{C}			Marilyn Burns^{A}		Olwen Fouéré
Drayton Sawyer	Jim Siedow	Jim Siedow					Bill Moseley	Dimo Alexiev	

== Reception ==
The Texas Chainsaw Massacre series, when compared to the other top-grossing American horror series—A Nightmare on Elm Street, Child's Play, Friday the 13th, Saw, Scream, and Halloween—and adjusting for 2023 inflation, is next to last with $459.7 million, Halloween is the highest-grossing horror series in the United States at approximately $1.09 billion. Next in line is Friday the 13th at $908.4 million, followed by the Nightmare on Elm Street series with $793.5 million. The Scream film series is in fourth place with $779.5 million, followed by the Saw series with $688.3 million, and the Child's Play film series rounding out the list with $305.2 million.

Film	Release date (US)	Budget	Box office			Reference
Film	Release date (US)	Budget	United States	International	Worldwide	Reference
The Texas Chain Saw Massacre (1974)	October 11, 1974	$140,000	$30,859,000	$1,378	$30,860,378	
The Texas Chainsaw Massacre 2	August 22, 1986	$4,600,000	$8,025,872	—N/a	$8,025,872	
Leatherface: The Texas Chainsaw Massacre III	January 12, 1990	$2,000,000	$5,765,562	—N/a	$5,765,562	
The Return of the Texas Chainsaw Massacre	September 22, 1995; August 29, 1997	$600,000	$185,898	—N/a	$185,898	
The Texas Chainsaw Massacre (2003)	October 17, 2003	$9,500,000	$80,571,655	$26,792,250	$107,363,905	
The Texas Chainsaw Massacre: The Beginning	October 6, 2006	$16,000,000	$39,517,763	$12,246,643	$51,764,406	
Texas Chainsaw 3D	January 4, 2013	$20,000,000	$34,341,945	$12,998,641	$47,340,586	
Leatherface	October 20, 2017	—N/a	—N/a	$1,476,843	$1,476,843	
Total		$50,340,000	$199,267,695	$53,515,755	$252,783,450	

== Other media ==
=== Books ===
Stephen Hand wrote a novelization of The Texas Chainsaw Massacre that was published March 1, 2004, by Black Flame.

While the 1974 film featured the character "Sally Hardesty," this novel follows the 2003 film's protagonist, Erin (played by Jessica Biel in the movie), and her friends as they encounter the Hewitt family (rather than the Sawyer family of the original). The plot follows five friends—Erin, Kemper, Morgan, Andy, and Pepper—driving through rural Texas on their way to a Lynyrd Skynyrd concert. After picking up a traumatized hitchhiker who commits suicide in their van, they seek help in a nearby town, eventually stumbling upon the Hewitt family residence and the chainsaw-wielding killer, Thomas Hewitt (Leatherface). Additionally, the book delves deeper into the backstory of Thomas Hewitt. While the movie briefly touches on his skin disease and employment at the slaughterhouse, the novelization provides more context on his psychological state and his relationship with the abusive Luda Mae and Sheriff Hoyt.

=== Comics ===
The cover to Leatherface #1, the first in a series of comics based on the film series

Several comic books based on The Texas Chainsaw Massacre films were published in 1991 by Northstar Comics entitled Leatherface. They were licensed as The Texas Chainsaw Massacre to Avatar Press for use in new comic book stories, the first of which was published in 2005. In 2006, Avatar Press lost the license to DC Comics imprint, Wildstorm, which has published new stories based on the films. However, in June 2007, Wildstorm changed a number of horror comics, including The Texas Chainsaw Massacre, from monthly issues to specials and miniseries.

The series of comics featured none of the main characters seen in the original film (Topps Comics Jason vs. Leatherface series is exempt) with the exception of Leatherface. The 1991 Leatherface miniseries was loosely based on the third Texas Chainsaw Massacre film. The writer of the miniseries, Mort Castle said: "The series was very loosely based on Texas Chainsaw Massacre III. I worked from the original script by David Schow and the heavily edited theatrical release of director Jeff Burr, but had more or less free rein to write the story the way it should have been told. The first issue sold 30,000 copies". Kirk Jarvinen drew the illustrations for the first issue, and Guy Burwell finished the rest of the series. The comics, not having the same censorship restrictions from the MPAA, featured much more gore than the finished film. The ending, as well as the fates of several characters, was also altered. An adaptation of The Texas Chain Saw Massacre was planned by Northstar Comics, but never came to fruition.

=== Video games ===
Thus far, three video games based on the franchise have seen release.

In 1983, The Texas Chainsaw Massacre, a mass-market video game adaptation of The Texas Chain Saw Massacre was released for the Atari 2600 by Wizard Video. In the game, the player assumes the role of Leatherface, and attempts to murder trespassers while avoiding obstacles such as fences and cow skulls. As one of the first horror-themed video games, The Texas Chain Saw Massacre caused controversy when it was released due to the violent nature of the video game and sold poorly as many video game stores refused to carry it. Wizard Video's other commercial release, Halloween, had a slightly better reception, but the limited number of copies sold has made both games highly valued items among Atari collectors.

In 2006, HeroCraft with publisher MindMatics released the mobile game Texas Chainsaw Massacre under license from New Line Cinema.

At The Game Awards held in December 2021, a new game titled The Texas Chain Saw Massacre, based around the original film, was announced to be released by Gun Interactive, the company behind Friday the 13th: The Game. The game was released for Microsoft Windows, PlayStation 4, PlayStation 5, Xbox One and Xbox Series X/S on August 18, 2023, also releasing on Xbox Game Pass on the same day.

The Texas Chainsaw Massacre content has been featured in video games such as Mortal Kombat X, Mortal Kombat Mobile, Dead by Daylight, Call of Duty: Modern Warfare, Call of Duty: Warzone, Rocket League, Pinball FX, and Fortnite.

=== All American Massacre ===
In 1998, filming began for All American Massacre, and was to be the series' fifth installment which would have served as both a sequel and prequel to The Texas Chainsaw Massacre 2. The film was initially conceived as a 15-minute short, but was expanded to a 60-minute feature. It was directed by William Hooper, son of Tobe Hooper. Bill Moseley reprised his role as the character Chop Top, who would have been revealed to have survived the events of The Texas Chainsaw Massacre 2 and been in a Texas psychiatric prison for a number of years. The plot of the film would have centered on Chop Top detailing his past in an interview with a news crew, before carrying out a new series of murders. Buckethead played Leatherface in the film. A trailer for All American Massacre was released on the internet, but the film itself was never released. While the film has yet to be officially released, a VHS workprint surfaced in an eBay listing in August of 2025. According to seller "Dusty Shed", it was previously auctioned off by Stephan Lokotsch, an executive producer and one of the actors in the film. It was kept in a storage locker, along with 40 promo film slides. The seller also noted that the workprint is unedited and incomplete. It was sold for US$8,500 a few days later on August 20.

=== Butcher Boys (2012) ===
In 2012, a continuation of the secret society subplot from The Return of the Texas Chainsaw Massacre titled Butcher Boys was released in 2012, despite the film featuring no characters from the film, it does set out to answer the ambiguity of the subplot.

=== Theme park attraction ===
In 2025, a haunted house attraction called Universal Horror Unleashed featured characters from the film franchise.

== See also ==
- Chain Saw Confidential
