= Leatherface =

Main character in the Texas Chainsaw Massacre series

- The Texas Chainsaw Massacre character
- Gunnar Hansen as Leatherface from The Texas Chain Saw Massacre (1974)
- First appearance: The Texas Chain Saw Massacre (1974)
- Created by: Kim Henkel; Tobe Hooper
- Portrayed by: Gunnar Hansen; Bill Johnson; R. A. Mihailoff; Robert Jacks; Andrew Bryniarski; Dan Yeager; Sam Strike; Mark Burnham

In-universe information
- Full name: Sawyer (TCM2) "Junior" Sawyer (TCM3); Thomas Brown Hewitt (Remake timeline); Jedidiah "Jed" Sawyer (Note: In the 2017 prequel, the character is referred to as "Jackson" throughout most the film, having been renamed while in foster care.) (Texas Chainsaw 3D, Leatherface)
- Occupation: Former butcher
- Classification: Mass murderer
- Primary location: Newt, Muerto County, Texas
- Signature weapons: Chainsaw; Sledgehammer

Leatherface is a fictional character from The Texas Chainsaw Massacre franchise. He first appeared in The Texas Chain Saw Massacre (1974) as a mentally disabled member of a family of deranged cannibals, who kills his victims with a chainsaw and wears their skin as masks. Created by Tobe Hooper and Kim Henkel, Leatherface was partially inspired by the crimes of Wisconsin murderer Ed Gein. The character has subsequently been featured in various other media, including novels, video games, and comic books; appearing in all nine films in the franchise.

Actor Gunnar Hansen was the first and most well-known actor to portray the character. Since Hansen's portrayal of Leatherface, numerous other actors and stuntmen have assumed the role of the character throughout the series.

The character's physical appearance and personality have evolved over the years, with various writers and special makeup effects artists leaving their marks on the character and his design. Unique among horror villains, in which most antagonists of the genre are usually classified as sadistic or evil, Leatherface has been characterized as committing his brutal acts primarily as a means of following his family's orders, while also killing out of fear or perceived self-defense. Leatherface has become a widely recognized figure in popular culture, gaining a reputation as an icon within the horror genre. He has been credited as one of the most influential villains of the slasher genre, and for inspiring the stereotype of the hulking, masked, silent killer, influencing further slasher characters such as Michael Myers and Jason Voorhees.

== Appearances ==
Leatherface is the only character to appear in all nine films in the Texas Chainsaw Massacre franchise, with later films exploring different aspects of him, while changing the overall history of the character and his family. Following his first appearance on the silver screen, Leatherface has appeared in various other entertainment mediums, which include comic book lines, novelizations, and video games; each appearance expands upon the universe created by the films.

=== Films ===
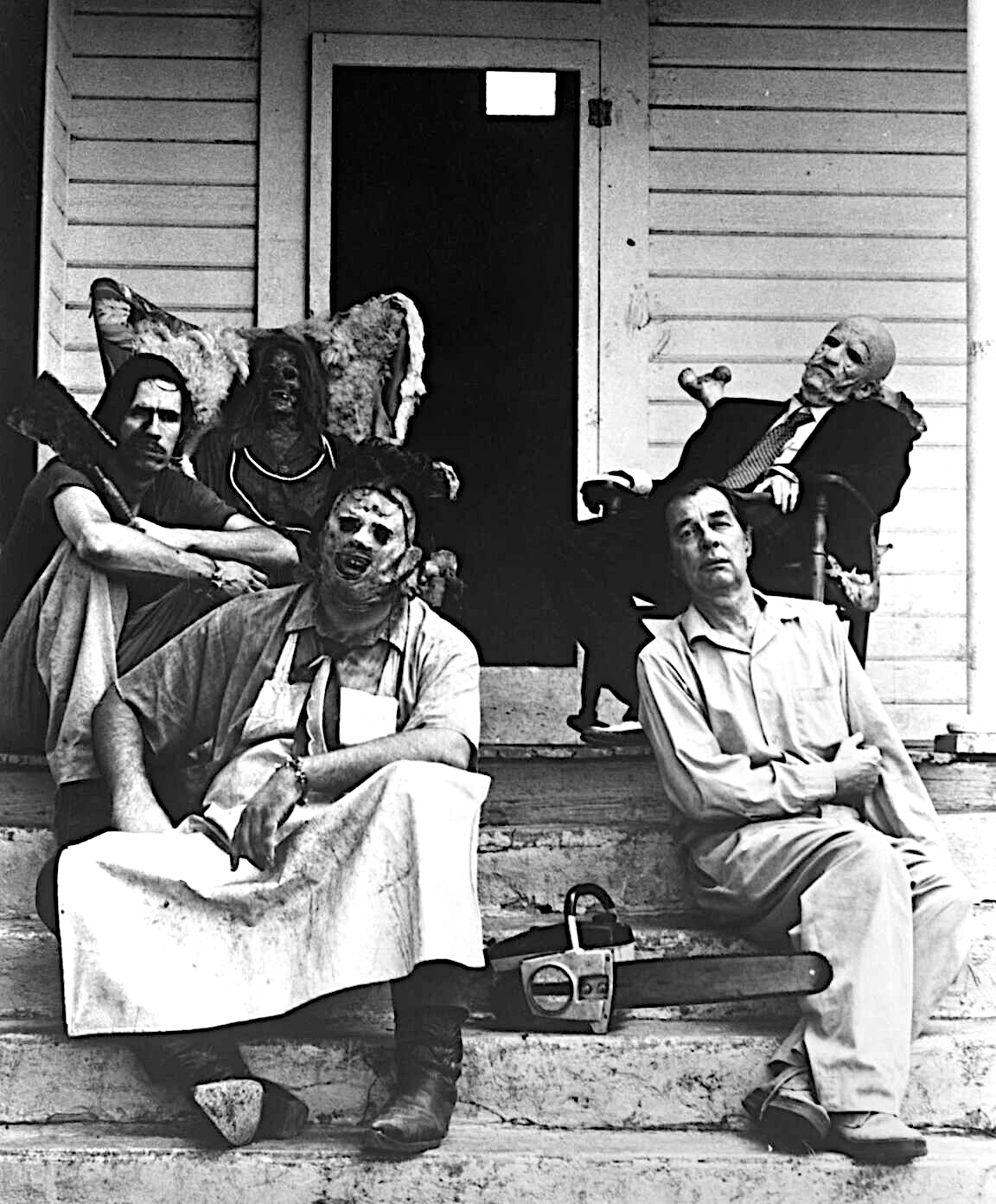
Leatherface depicted in a 1973 publicity photograph

Leatherface made his first appearance in the original The Texas Chain Saw Massacre in 1974. Here, Leatherface (Gunnar Hansen) is depicted as wearing the human skin of his victims as a mask. He and his family capture and murder a group of teenagers one-by-one as they trespass upon their property. (Note: Although the name of the family was not mentioned in the first film, according to Gunnar Hansen, faint letters on the gas station that hints the family's surname as "Slaughter".) The character's second appearance was in the 1986 sequel, The Texas Chainsaw Massacre 2. The film reveals that Leatherface (Bill Johnson) and his family have been on the run, and are being hunted by the uncle of a previous victim. Leatherface and most of his family are seemingly killed when a grenade detonates in their hidden lair. In Leatherface: The Texas Chainsaw Massacre III (1990), Leatherface (R.A. Mihailoff) appears alongside new family members as they capture a young couple when they get lost on the back roads of Texas. Leatherface is eventually knocked unconscious and left to drown in a bog. He is later revealed to have survived, emerging from the bog with his chainsaw. In Texas Chainsaw Massacre: The Next Generation (1995), a group of teenagers attending their high school prom stumble across Leatherface and his adoptive family; all but one are killed.

Leatherface returns in the 2003 remake of the original film. Here, Leatherface (Andrew Bryniarski) and his family murder a group of teenagers. Leatherface loses one of his arms in a fight with one of the teens, before killing several police officers investigating his family home. The Texas Chainsaw Massacre: The Beginning (2006) provides a backstory to how Leatherface and his family became cannibals. It also details why Leatherface wears a mask of human flesh; as a young man, he purchased such a mask from a caravan of Scythian nomads. Throughout the film, Leatherface (Bryniarski) and his family torture and murder two couples as they drive through Travis County, Texas.

Texas Chainsaw 3D (2013), is a direct sequel to the original 1974 film. Picking up 40 years after the original, Leatherface (Dan Yeager) has been living in seclusion. It is only when his newly discovered cousin Heather (Alexandra Daddario) arrives that Leatherface emerges to commit a new string of murders. A prequel to the original film, titled Leatherface, was released in October 2017. It centers on Leatherface/Jedidiah (Sam Strike) being institutionalized after his family murdered the daughter of law enforcement officer. He escapes the mental hospital years later. Jedidiah suffers extensive physical trauma to his face by law enforcement. He eventually kills them, and uses their skin to craft his first face mask to hide his disfigured face.

Texas Chainsaw Massacre (2022) also served as a direct sequel to the original film. Picking up several decades after the original film, the story focuses on an aging Leatherface (Mark Burnham), living in relative peace with an elderly woman named Virginia "Ginny" McCumber (Alice Krige). When an altercation with a group of young adults leaves Ginny dead from a heart attack, he finally snaps. Fashioning a new mask out of Ginny's face before retrieving his old chainsaw, he begins slaughtering members of the group, gaining the attention of Texas Ranger Sally Hardesty (Olwen Fouéré), the sole survivor of his original killing spree. After slaughtering many people, including Sally, Leatherface returns to the house where the original 'massacre' began.

=== Literature ===
Leatherface's first foray away from the silver screen was in 1991, with Northstar Comics' four-issue miniseries Leatherface. This was a loose adaptation of the 1990 film Leatherface: The Texas Chainsaw Massacre III written by novelist Morton Castle. The miniseries followed the basic storyline of the film, with additional insight into Leatherface's mental state, as well as modifying character and plot elements to be different from that of the film. In 1995, Nancy A. Collins wrote a three issue, non-canonical miniseries involving a crossover between Jason Voorhees of Friday the 13th series and Leatherface. In the story, Jason meets Leatherface, who adopts him into his family after the two become friends before turning on each other.

In 2004, a novelization of the 2003 remake was released. It was based on one of the film's earlier drafts, containing plot points that were discarded from the film's final draft, including Leatherface's murder of Jedidiah, one of his younger family members who had decided to help Erin escape. In 2005, Avatar Press began publishing a comic books based on the 2003 remake continuity. Leatherface made his official appearance in The Texas Chainsaw Massacre Special #1, a one-shot comic, centering on a group of three escaped convicts who rob the Hewitt family General store, bringing them into direct conflict with Leatherface and his family. In The Texas Chainsaw Massacre: The Grind, a three-issue miniseries where Leatherface and the rest of the Hewitt family terrorize and kill a group of choir students and teachers whose bus breaks down near the Hewitt residence. Leatherface appears in Avatar's final one-shot comic, The Texas Chainsaw Massacre Fearbook, which features Leatherface killing a group of cross-country travelers, with the exception of one girl, who is forced to wear the face of her dead friend and dance with Leatherface.

From January to June 1, 2007, WildStorm began publishing a six-issue series titled "Americanivore". Set one year after the events of the 2003 film, Leatherface and his family are hunted by the FBI led by agent Baines who seeks to avenge the death of his niece Pepper. Leatherface is also being tracked by a television news crew who attempts to capture him on film. The series climaxes in a bloody standoff, leaving most of the news crew and pursuing agents dead, and the sole surviving crew member escaping with Leatherface's chainsaw. On July 18, 2007, the company released The Texas Chainsaw Massacre: About A Boy, which chronicles Leatherface's journey through adolescence, and what it was like growing up with kids his own age. In Wildstorm's one-shot The Texas Chainsaw Massacre: Cut!, Leatherface comes across a group of independent filmmakers, thirty years after the events of the 2003 remake, who are making a documentary about the Hewitt family.

A three-issue limited series, titled Raising Cain, was published by WildStorm in late 2008. The story centered on twins Cain and Abel, who are born into the Hewitt family, with their mother wanting her children to escape the family's blood-soaked heritage, bringing her and the twins into conflict with Leatherface and the rest of his family. Leatherface made a brief appearance in New Line Cinema's Tales of Horror anthology, published by WildStorm, which features Leatherface and the Hewitt family meeting a traveling salesman who tries to sell them chainsaws.

=== Video games ===
Leatherface made his video game debut in the controversial 1982 video game adaptation of the first film released on the Atari 2600 by Wizard Video. In the game, the player assumes the role of Leatherface as he attempts to murder trespassers, all the while avoiding obstacles such as fences and cow skulls.

Leatherface also appears as a playable character in the 2015 fighting games Mortal Kombat X and Mortal Kombat Mobile as a downloadable content bonus character. He was added alongside other horror icons such as Jason Voorhees, Predator, and Xenomorph.

He was added as a downloadable playable killer for Dead by Daylight in September 2017, utilizing his signature chainsaw and sledgehammer as weapons. Shortly after Sally's escape in The Texas Chain Saw Massacre film, he begins to panic at the thought of his family's atrocities being exposed to the police. Amid his trepidation, he is taken to the universe of Dead by Daylight by a supernatural force known as "The Entity".

He has made appearances as an Operator in the Call of Duty franchise with Call of Duty: Modern Warfare and Call of Duty: Warzone.

The character appears in the 2023 asymmetrical survival horror game The Texas Chain Saw Massacre, which was developed by Gun Media and is based on the original 1974 film. In the game, players begin a match by taking the role of either a family member or a victim, with a total of three family members, which includes Leatherface, and four victims being playable for a total of seven players per match. The main objective for Leatherface is to use his chainsaw to hunt down the four victims and make sure they do not escape the match.

Leatherface was included as an unlockable skin in Fortnite during 2024's edition of their Fortnitemares event.

== Concept and creation ==
Created by Tobe Hooper and Kim Henkel, the concept for Leatherface was developed while Hooper worked as an assistant film director at the University of Texas at Austin and as a documentary cameraman during the late 1960s. During this period, Hooper had grown increasingly disillusioned by what he referred to as the "lack of sentimentality and the brutality of things" witnessing the graphic and dispassionate violence depicted in the news at the time. This led Hooper to believe that "man was the real monster here, just wearing a different face", a belief that he later instilled into the character. According to Henkel, making Leatherface human instead of a typical monster made the character more frightening, stating "the only genuinely frightening thing to people is [other] people".

Some elements for Leatherface were inspired by the crimes of Wisconsin murderer and grave-robber Ed Gein (Note: Attributed to multiple sources:) whom Hooper claimed to have heard stories of from relatives who had lived near where his crimes had been committed, though Hooper admitted he did not know it was Gein until after the film's release. One detail from Gein's crimes that Hooper found particularly disturbing, and a trait that he and his fellow co-writer instilled into the character was Gein's penchant for crafting and wearing human flesh as masks; a concept that first made its appearance onto the silver screen in Deranged (1974), a film directly inspired by Gein, released eight months before Hooper's film. Hooper has stated in later years that additional inspiration was taken from an event that occurred in his early years of college. While at a Halloween party, a friend of his who had been a pre-med student at the time, had arrived at the party wearing the face of a cadaver as a 'joke'. Hooper was deeply shaken by the incident, later confiding to actor William Butler about the event, which he would call 'the most disturbing thing I have ever seen'. While brainstorming the character's design, both filmmakers felt that Leatherface should be a large, menacing figure with child-like behavior; with Hooper citing the cartoon character Baby Huey as a source of inspiration.

Early renditions of the script included a detailed backstory to the character, explaining many aspects of the character. In the original script, Leatherface was depicted as a victim of torture during his childhood, with his face possibly skinned off. Script rewrites later removed this aspect in favor of leaving him undefined while adding the concept of alternating personalities. Henkel and Hooper developed the notion of the character being mentally disabled, affecting his ability to think and speak rationally and coherently. Glimpses into this deteriorated mental state were depicted in the form of incomprehensible gibberish on two separate occasions in the film; once when Leatherface attempts to "speak" to Drayton (credited in the film as the "Old Man"), and the second occurring the famous dinner scene. Leatherface was originally scripted to have several lines of dialogue in his conversation with Drayton where he reassures him that everything is 'ok'. Filmmakers were dissatisfied with the resulting scene as it was written, with Hansen noting it made the character seem "too rational", and was rewritten to fit the filmmaker's vision of a demented and mentally disabled maniac. The idea for the character's trademark chainsaw came to Hooper while he was in the hardware section of a busy store, as the frustrated director contemplated how to speed his way through a large crowd.

=== Portrayers ===
The difficult part of the movie was that, physically, it was so demanding.... Just generally, the demand of doing a movie where you're shooting 12 or 16 hours a day, seven days a week and it's 100 degrees — I think that was the worst part for me.

— Gunnar Hansen on the physical requirements for the role.

The role of Leatherface is known for being physically and emotionally challenging, with actors required to perform the necessary stunts associated with the role under grueling working conditions, while also giving emotional depth to the character.

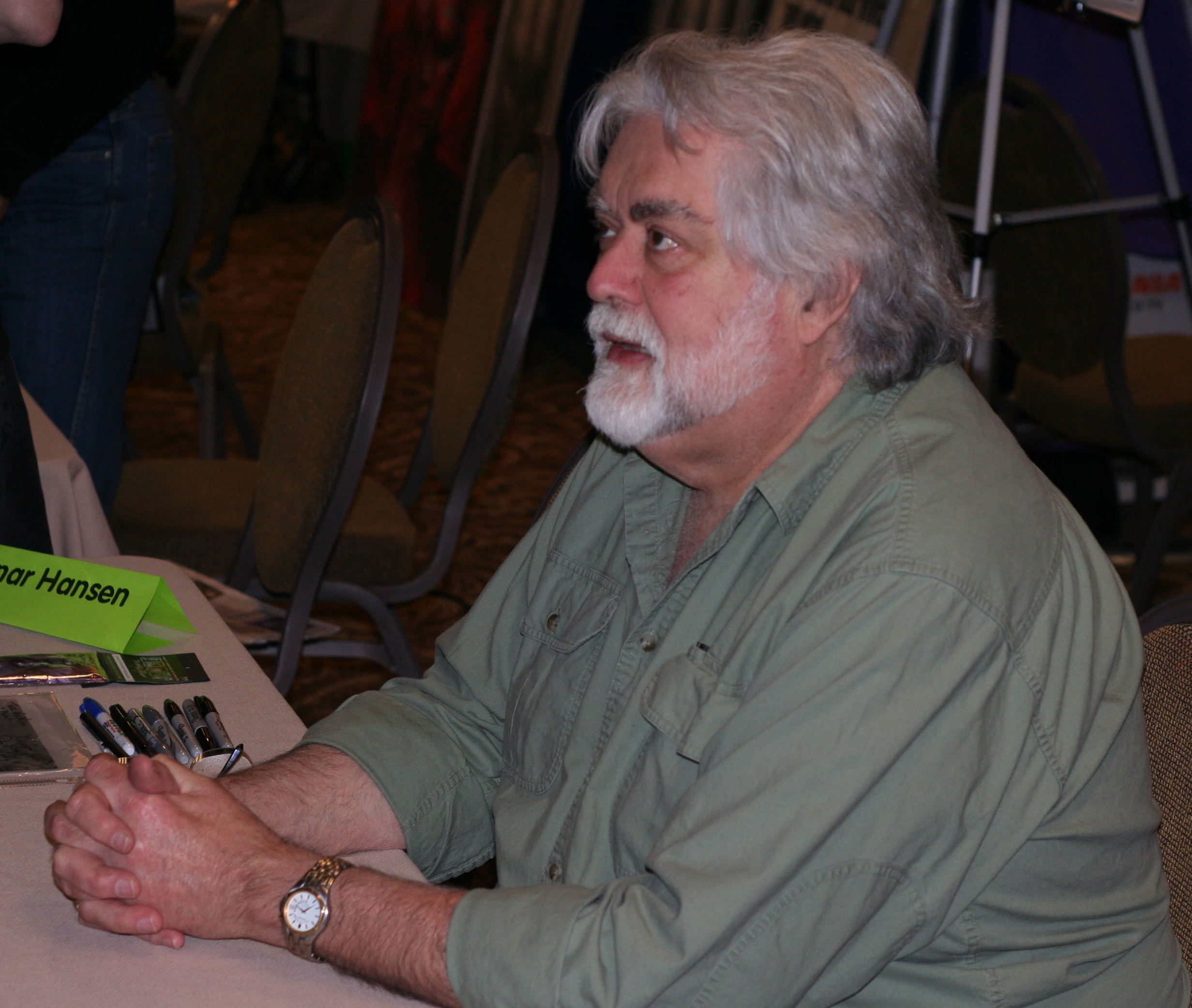
Gunnar Hansen (pictured 2009) was the first actor to portray Leatherface, later publishing a book on his experience.

Actor Gunnar Hansen was the first to portray the role of Leatherface, auditioning for the role after hearing from a friend about a group of filmmakers that were making a horror film and needed someone to portray a 'crazed murderer'. The filmmakers were impressed with the actor's imposing figure, and later cast him in the role. During his first meeting with the filmmakers, Hooper explained the character in detail for Hansen; describing Leatherface as being mentally impaired, and insane, which made the character violent and unpredictable. Hansen experimented with different vocal tones and pitches to find the right voice for the character. He also visited a special needs school in Austin, observing how the students moved and spoke, in an attempt to find the proper movement and behavior. The role was physically and psychologically taxing for the actor, having to work up to sixteen hours a day seven days a week in extremely hot and humid weather conditions. Hansen was kept separate from other actors, as the filmmakers wanted the actors' fear of the character to be genuine. The mask itself greatly impaired the actor's ability to see, as the eyeholes on the design were too small for Hansen to see through clearly. This issue later proved problematic while filming the scene where Leatherface kills Kirk (William Vail), as Hansen unintentionally gave the actor a black eye after hitting him in the face with a fake sledgehammer. The infamous final scene where Leatherface twirls around in a rage with his chainsaw, referred to as the "Chainsaw Dance", was partially improvised on the day of shooting. As the actor later wrote, the scene came from all his frustration during filming, which he admitted came out in the final shot in the film with Leatherface madly swinging the chainsaw around, jokingly referred to it as a last-ditch effort to 'kill' the director.

Bill Johnson was hired to portray Leatherface in the film's sequel, The Texas Chainsaw Massacre 2. Johnson, having not seen the original film before, viewed the film the day before his audition. Johnson described being impressed by the film, calling it 'eerie, very deeply disturbing, unsettling, and unnerving, but also inspiring'. Johnson felt free to put his spin on the character, opting to "stay out of Gunnar's shoes" while making the character his own. Knowing the physical demands required for the role, Johnson strove to do the best acting job he could for the character, taking inspiration from the dedication of the film's cast and crew. Johnson remained in character throughout production, spending much of his time in his trailer preparing each scene that he was in. Stuntman Bob Elmore was hired, alongside Tom Morga as Johnson's stunt doubles. Elmore performed many of the physical scenes for the character including the chainsaw battle with Dennis Hopper, and the overall stunt portion of the infamous "chainsaw love" scene. Morga only performed part of the stunts required for the opening bridge scene. Filming was particularly grueling for Johnson, Elmore, and the rest of the cast and crew, as they had to deal with extreme temperatures while in a heavily insulated costume that only exposed the eyes and mouth. Elmore later described the entire experience as being incredibly grueling, having repeated clashes with the film's stunt coordinator Jim "Jimmy" Stephan, who regularly berated and verbally abused Elmore and the other stunt performers. Elmore also sustained a broken wrist while performing in the opening scene. Despite the hardships during production, the rest of the cast spoke highly of Johnson, commending his dedication towards the role and his ability to imbue the character with emotional depth beyond just portraying him as just a man in a mask. Elmore also received praise, which one actor stated "[had] brought this incredible viciousness" into the role.

While developing the third film in the series, it was decided that Leatherface should have a more central role as the film's primary star, above that of his cannibalistic family. Actor and former professional wrestler Randal Allen "R.A." Mihailoff was hired for the role in Leatherface: The Texas Chainsaw Massacre III. Early on in development, the studio fast-tracked development and shot a teaser trailer, with actor and stunt performer Kane Hodder portraying the character, (Note: Hodder later returned to provide motion capture work for the character in the upcoming video game Texas Chainsaw Massacre.) before a director was even hired. Hodder was later retained for the film as Mihailoff's stunt double and stunt coordinator.

Next Generation director Kim Henkel wanted an "androgynous type" for the role. To that effect, songwriter and actor Robert "Robbie" Jacks was brought on for the role, with Andy Cockrum, who also portrayed the Stuffed DPS Officer, serving as Jacks stunt double during certain scenes. According to Jacks, who was a homosexual: "[Leatherface's] androgyny was kind of inferred [sic] in the first movie, but because of the times, and because of the budget, it wasn't really brought forth." Special effects artist Joshua "J.M." Logan stated that Jacks was committed to bringing the character to life, spending hours during the make-up process. The Next Generation was a relatively low-budget production, forcing cast members to perform a majority of their own stunts during filming as they could not afford to hire stunt doubles. Stunt doubles were only used in scenes where cast members could not perform the required action themselves. Fellow cast member Tyler Cone recalled that Jacks had some difficulty with the physicality of the role, particularly in scenes involving Lisa Marie Newmyer and Renée Zellweger. A bruised Jacks and some of the actresses later confronted the producers after a particularly difficult time shooting, with the actor revealing in an interview on Sarah Bernhard's show Reel Wild Cinema, that he felt that the producers had played on the eagerness of the cast in order to get them to participate in hazardous working conditions. Cast and crew members remembered Jacks as being a very kind and eager person to work with, as actor John Harrison later recalled Jacks to be a stark contrast to the character he played in the film, calling him a "very kind and gentle spirit".

It became an intense character study. I went to the darkest place in my mind, stuff I don't even feel as a person, but I can feel as human... My deranged killer is not at all sympathetic. I did not play him for his likeability.

— Andrew Bryniarski on his approach to the character

Actor and former bodybuilder Andrew Bryniarski was hired to portray Leatherface in Platinum Dunes's 2003 remake of the original film, and the only character to reappear from the original film. Bryniarski, a huge fan of the original film, learned from producer Michael Bay that the producer was working on the remake after meeting up with him during a party and would adamantly lobbied for the role of Leatherface. In preparation for the role, the 6 foot 5 inch (1.96 meters), 265-pound actor subsisted on a diet of brisket and white bread to gain an additional 35 pounds. In addition, Bryniarski researched everything about the original film and the crimes of Gein to come up with his interpretation of the character. Bryniarski performed most of his stunt work throughout most of the film's production, describing the experience as particularly challenging, noting the limited visibility and mobility while wearing the costume as well as the extreme temperatures during filming. Bryniarski later reprised his role as Leatherface three years later in the film's prequel, The Texas Chainsaw Massacre: The Beginning (2006), as filmmakers were very impressed with the actor's contribution to the character in the previous entry in the franchise. Bryniarski met with Hansen out of respect for the actor's work before signing on for the prequel, whom Bryniarski claimed had commended him on his performance (Note: There have been doubts about the legitimacy of Bryniarski's claims, as Hansen was known to have expressed his disappointment in the character's portrayal in the remake series.) while giving the actor his blessing. Bryniarski's hiring for the prequel marked the only time an actor has portrayed the character in more than one film. Bryniarski was advised by the filmmakers of the prequel to forget much of the traits that had defined Leatherface in the previous film, as the prequel depicted a Leatherface that was not fully formed, having yet to embrace his true monstrous nature.

Wanting to avoid casting someone physically fit "bodybuilder types", producer Carl Mazzocone opted for someone with an imposing stature but also one that "had a bit of a belly". To that effect, actor Daniel "Dan" Yeager was hired early on in production for the role of Leatherface. John Luessenhop recalled meeting the 6 foot 6 inch (1.98 m) actor at a holiday party hosted by Yeager's friend and Mazzocone. Luessenhop stated that he could no longer think of another actor to portray the character afterwards. Yeager loved the overall complexity of the character, which he felt was both pitied and feared, describing the character as "a unique combination of love, fear, and violence". Yeager prepared for the role by working out, increasing his current 250-pound frame to 275 pounds, in order to get the right physicality necessary to portray the character. Yeager also rewatched the original film, as well as study the script for that film to develop a version of Leatherface that he felt was a continuation from that chapter of the character's life. Yeagar came up with an awkward and lumbering stride for Leatherface, as he felt that he [Leatherface] was left with a "compromised physicality" from the leg injury he received in the first film. Yeager admitted that the movements he performed for the character later affected him physically for a while after the shooting had wrapped. He later credited his previous work as a stage actor, which he felt had helped him to portray the character while wearing the heavy costume.

English actor Sam Strike was cast as the character in the 2017 prequel of the same name, while Boris Kabakchief portrayed the character as a child. Strike joined the film after reading the script, which he opined was, for a horror film, very character-driven. He felt that there needed to be a contrast between the two sides of the character, to show how a person can become such a killer: "It could happen to anybody. He had it in him because of his mother, but was at the mercy of his environment." The actor also integrated aspects from the original film into his performance out of respect, but intended to make the role his own, rather than repeating what came before. To make Jedidiah's transformation into Leatherface more believable, he intentionally tried to gain physical body weight before filming commenced; eating and working out to have the look and feel of the character in his early years, which he felt "could take your head off with a slap". Strike developed a "battle cry" for the character whenever he lost his temper, as one of the ways the character expressed his rage. The film's directors commended Strike for his performance and commitment to the character, feeling that the actor brought something "very intense and deeply human" to the character.

In the 2022 entry in the franchise, producers Fede Álvarez and Rodo Sayagues wanted an older Leatherface similar to Michael Myers in the 2018 version of Halloween. Putting out casting calls for the film, producers described their vision for the character, whom they listed under the name "Kenny", as being a 60-year-old man who is characterized as having a "big build". Actor and filmmaker Mark Burnham was later cast as the character due in part to his imposing stature and physicality, which Álvarez felt was a great continuation of the late Hansen's portrayal of the character. The audition process for Burnam particularly lengthy, which the actor recollected that he sent five different audition tapes to the producers before they had him perform an audition for Álvarez. Burnham was told by producers what they wanted in his performance as something that could mirror Hansen's portrayal of the character "if he had played him today". The actor credited the lengthy casting process as helping him to prepare and understand the character's motivation and rage. The final shot in the film, a homage to the original "chainsaw dance", was shot in a single take. As director David Blue Garcia recalled, "we gave Mark the freedom to cut loose while we improvised around him". At first, the film's cast were intimidated by the 6 ft 7in (Note: Some sources report the Burnham's height as 6 feet 6 inches.) actor's presence, but fondly remembered Bunham as being a kind and generous person despite the grueling conditions he had to work through. Burnham himself reflected on his time as the character as being a challenging but fun experience.

=== Design ===
Robert A. Burns applies paint to a latex mold cast, designing the first of three masks used in the original film.

The physical design for Leatherface has undergone several changes through the course of the franchise, with each filmmaker putting their own interpretation on the character. While some of these changes were subtle, others would be significantly different.

For The Texas Chain Saw Massacre, art director Robert A. Burns was given the task of developing Leatherface's design, in addition to designing "Grandpa" and the film's set design. In total, three separate masks were created and used for the film: the "Killing Mask", the "Old Lady Mask" and the "Pretty Woman Mask", the latter of which was affectionately referred to by Kim Henkel as the "Clarabell Clown" mask due to its resemblance to the character from The Howdy Doody Show. The "Killing Mask", described in the script as more like a "close fitting hood" covering the character's entire head, was the first mask Leatherface is shown to wear, while dressed in his signature butcher's outfit. The masks themselves were created from face molds cast by Dr. W. E. Barnes, Molds were cast of locals, who had volunteered to have casts taken of their heads, one of the volunteers was the film's producer Jay Parsley, whose head cast was used to make the "Killing Mask". Once the molds had been set, Burns modified them with the help of Barnes, using dental algenate to create facial expressions for each mask. (Note: Contrary to the director's claims that the masks were made of "coat hanger(s) and some kind of parchment paper") Burns also experimented with different latex mixtures to make the masks appear like layers of dried skin, eventually using a combination of liquid latex and yellow fiberglass insulation. Pieces of the material for each mask were then sewn together with a thin wire. A set of dentures was also created using extracted baby teeth. (Note: Attributed to multiple sources:) Different outfits were designed for each of the three masks, to convey the different personalities associated with each mask. The "Killing Mask" outfit, consisted of Hanson's own shirt, a pair of dress pants, a butcher's apron, and a tie with a scalloped silver curve Burns had painted onto it. The boots were Hanson's old cowboy boots that Burns had modified with insoles and three-inch heels, adding three inches to the actor's imposing stature.

Make-up effects artist Tom Savini and Mitch Devane designed the Leatherface mask in Texas Chainsaw Massacre 2, in addition to the design of Chop Top and Grandpa. Both artists envisioned the mask as something created by stitching together different pieces from multiple human faces in a jigsaw-like aesthetic. Devane was responsible for creating the mask in the film, using a plaster cast of Johnson's head which he then sculpted and modified into the look seen in the film. Johnson was also given blister make-up around his mouth to imply that Leatherface was diseased underneath the mask, in addition to wearing specially-made dentures to mirror the scene of the character in the first film.

The script for the third film in the franchise called for a more disfigured look to Leatherface, with the implication that the character suffered from syphilis, which had eaten away much of his face. The design for the mask was done by KNB EFX Group led by Robert Kurtzman, with assistance from Greg Nicotero. Both artists were instructed to create a version of the Leatherface mask that was 'still identifiable as the original mask but with a modern spin on it'. To that effect, the design team came up with many different sketches and ideas on what they wanted the mask to look like, some discarded concepts included a "war helmet" created from an animal skull, before finally deciding upon a more "errant teenager" look for the character. Production designer Mick Strawn, who assisted in the design process, recalled the original intention of having Leatherface's mask be a "one-piece", with the entire mask having been created from a single human face. This design aspect was quickly abandoned by the effects crew, who felt that it did not work for the character. Other abandoned ideas included a scene from one of Schow's earlier drafts, depicting Leatherface removing his mask, revealing his noseless and mangled face. The final mask design, which one media outlet opined as one of the character's most disturbing mask designs, was to be more graphic than previous versions of the character's face mask, as it was made by one of Leatherface's more recent victims. Design details such as more jigsaw-style patchwork for the stitches, dried blood around the stitches, and tears, in addition to a wider opening for the mouth, that exposed the character's cracked lips and crooked teeth. Strawn and Nicotero based the design on the concept of Leatherface's mask, intended as a modernization of the "Killing Mask" in the original film, as something that had been made using different pieces of human skin that were torn and sewn in a very patchwork fashion. The mask was sculpted using latex, using a base mold head cast made from the father of fellow KNB EFX member Howard Berger.

The Next Generation's iteration of the character was designed by Joshua "J.M." Logan. Logan admitted in an interview years later that he drew inspiration from a conversation he had with Henkel where the director explained the meaning and purpose behind each of the character's masks, and the directors intention to focus more on the character's "confused sexuality". Using this notion that Leatherface had a side of himself that he created to make himself look "beautiful", Logan felt free to explore the more feminine aspects of the character that were barely addressed in the previous films. Designing the character's look for the film incorporates the idea that Leatherface used more than just a person's face when "becoming" a certain personality, with the design for the Pretty Lady mask including a woman's upper torso and arms. The Pretty Lady mask was designed using molds of the film's production designer Deborah "Debbie" Pastor, who volunteered to have casts done from molds on her head and chest.

For the 2003 version of The Texas Chainsaw Massacre, effects artist Scott Stoddard envisioned Leatherface as an amateur taxidermist, with the mask itself a combination of many different pieces taken off the faces of his victims. As Stoddard explained, each piece of Leatherface's mask was something the character had seen and admired, which was then stitched together in a crude and rudimentary fashion. Many of the earlier designs took into consideration the age of each face that made up the mask; some pieces were very old and dried up, while other pieces were "months old" and still retained moisture that caused those pieces drooped down the face. The final design was deliberately made to look as though it was all stitched together in places that "didn't make any sense", as Stoddard felt that Leatherface admired a certain part of an individual's face but stitched them together in a way that could fit on him, one such design aspect was the inclusion of the nose and mouth of a woman stitched into the neck portion of the mask. Details such as open sores, pus balls, and chapped lips were applied to the exposed area around the actor's mouth, implying that the character was suffering from a skin disease. The "Kemper Mask" that the character wears during the scene where he attacks the van was constructed from a cast of the actor Eric Balfour. Nicotero later returned to the franchise in The Beginning as the film's lead makeup and effects artist. Nicotero found creating the design for Leatherface to be particularly challenging, as the look was meant to signify the character's evolution of their mask. The effects artist experimented with various design aspects to come up with the look and feel of a Leatherface that had yet to embrace his true monstrous nature. In the final portion of the film when Leatherface dons his first face mask skinned from Matt Bomer's character, casts were done on the actor's head. The mask itself underwent slight modifications, such as the incorporation of Bomer's hair and facial hair onto the overall design, the former was accomplished by adding two flaps onto the back of the mask, to give off the appearance that Leatherface had skinned the entire head rather than just the face as he would do in later years.

Original unused concept designs for Leatherface from Texas Chainsaw 3D, concept art by Jerad S Marantz, using an earlier draft of the film's script, Marantz emphasized the time-span from the original film iterate the original draft of Leatherface wearing the faces of senior citizens.

For the 2013 reboot, KNB EFX Group led by co-founder Howard Berger with the assistance of makeup artist Mike McCarty, was hired to bring the character back to his roots. Working from the earlier screenplay drafts, in which Leatherface was depicted as a more elderly version of the character, concept art by Jerad S. Marantz emphasized the forty-year time-span between the original film and the new iteration of the character. Details such as Leatherface killing and wearing the faces of senior citizens were incorporated into Marantz's earlier designs. Subsequent rewrites of the original draft abandoned the concept, as Luessenhop wanted a design that looked more "crispy" and resembling something more like tanned leather. In the end, Berger designed three separate masks used by Leatherface in the film: the "Pretty Woman" mask seen at the beginning of the film, the "Comfort" mask, and the "Slaughterhouse" mask, also referred to as the character's "Rage mask" during production. Each mask was molded to fit Yeager's face and given more flexibility than previously created for the character, giving Yeager more freedom to express himself with his face and eyes. The "Pretty Woman" mask was created as a replica of the mask seen in the first film using modern-day materials, while the "Slaughterhouse" and "Comfort" masks were both original designs by the KNB EFX team. The "Slaughterhouse" mask was intentionally designed to feel distorted and warped from old age; pieces of facial hair were added to the design to make it look and feel distinct, while granules of salt were mixed into the latex to give it a rough and ridged look.

Undergoing a significant departure from previous entries, Lionsgate's 2017 prequel was to be the first in the series to depict the character not wearing his face mask throughout most of the film's duration. Only three separate masks, designed by effects artist and filmmaker Olivier Afonso, are briefly depicted in the film. These masks, such as the "Cowhead", muzzle, and the Hartman/Lizzy face mask, were designed to show the evolution of his identity leading up to him donning his first face mask at the end of the film. Afonso also designed the character's look after his face is severed by gunfire.

Filmmakers for the ninth entry in the franchise wanted to take the character back to his roots, opted for an "old school" to the character, whom producer Álvarez referred to as "Old Man Leatherface". To that effect, Illusion Industries Inc. founder Todd Tucker and Martin Astles were hired to bring about a new iteration of the character. The design process for the character was particularly difficult due to the intricate design process, with viable effort made create a look for the character that was consistent with the original film, while given the incentive to make the character look as scary as possible. Eventually basing their design upon the 'Old Lady' character Ginny, different masks were created using casts made from silicone and sculpted to give the appearance that the face had been "ripped off". Tucker intentionally designed the mask to be drooping and sagging, which gave off a 'sad' look to the character. Tucker clashed with the producers on the design, as producers wanted the look to resemble Michael Myers' mask, as the studio felt this was scarier because of its emotionless appearance. Eventually, Tucker was able to convince the studio of the original design after explaining to them how it worked well with the current state of the character. A total of twenty masks were created and used in the film, with five different looks depicting the mask in different states of gore and decay.

== Characteristics ==
Leatherface has undergone several shifts in personality and motivations following his first appearance in 1974, with each subsequent change largely depending on the filmmaker's vision for the character to various effect. The franchise itself has been known for its inconsistent tone and history, due in part to it frequently changing production rights with various companies, resulting in tonal changes that affected the character and his personality. In the original Texas Chain Saw Massacre, Leatherface was portrayed as a large, chainsaw-wielding murderer, characterized as having interchanging personalities depending on which mask he wore, in addition to occasional cross-dressing and themes of sexual ambiguity. The latter traits have never been fully explored or revisited in later entries in the franchise, except for The Next Generation. Regardless of these changes, the characterization of Leatherface as intellectually disabled, and mentally disturbed were retained in each entry of the franchise. In some appearances, traits such as superhuman strength and resilience were added to the character, though some commentators felt this was an attempt to make the character similar to other more popular slashers, such as Halloween's Michael and Friday the 13th's Jason.

=== Personality ===
In his first appearance, Leatherface was characterized as having a severe mental disability, incapable of rational thought or coherent speech. Uncommon for antagonists of the genre, who usually are classified as sadistic or evil, Leatherface is depicted committing his brutal acts out of fear and as a means of following the orders dictated to him by his family, though not out of evil intention. Hansen described Leatherface as someone "completely under the control of his family" while also being afraid of them, going on to explain that, although Leatherface is the most powerful and violent member of his family, he is also the most fearful. Hooper argued on the notion in the documentary Texas Chainsaw Massacre: The Shocking Truth (2001), referring to Leatherface as a 'big baby', and someone genuinely frightened of all the new people entering his home to the point of violence, Hooper stated that he intended for Leatherface to be frightened by his own violent acts, stating "what he [Leatherface] does scares the hell out of him... he knows he's in trouble—not trouble with the law so much as trouble with his older brother". Fellow horror actor Doug Bradley, of Hellraiser fame, had confided to Hansen during a conversation that he felt Leatherface was something other than 'just a crazed killer'; observing the character's child-like behavior and submissive demeanor in regards to the orders dictated to him by other members of his family, made the character something different than just a madman and more of an obedient child. Critic and author Jason Zinoman compared Leatherface's depiction to that of Boris Karloff's performance as Frankenstein's monster, commenting how each character was both able to elicit sympathy while continuing to be a source of dread for the audience. While the characterization of Leatherface acting out of fear and for the protection of his home placed the character in a somewhat sympathetic light, commentators have commented on the character's screams, grunts and squeals imply his mentality as more animal than human. Scenes where Leatherface jabbers and squeals incoherently to Drayton were intended to convey the character's deteriorated mind, as Hooper has explained to Hansen that these noises were words that Leatherface tried to convey, and meant something to him [Leatherface], however, his limited intelligence made him incapable of forming them into any sort of coherent speech.

In The Texas Chainsaw Massacre 2, Leatherface has undergone a coming of age, shedding the feminine personalities that he had in the first film. Screenwriter L. M. Kit Carson's vision for Leatherface added more depth and detail to the character's mindset, while also exploring his motivations and personality. Actor Johnson described the sequel as taking place in a parallel universe, noting that while both his and Hansen's version of the character were from similar worlds, each had significant differences between them to be separate from one another. This transformation of the character's mindset from someone who only saw others as either food or a threat, and thinking only in terms of his family, into developing a potential love interest in the film's female character [Stretch], was viewed by some film historians as a 'maturing' of the character. University of California Professor Carol J. Clover described Leatherface before this transition as being "permanently locked in childhood"; only after encountering Stretch, Clover writes, that he seemingly 'comes of age', developing a crush on her which causes him to lose his blood lust. Johnson echoed this sentiment, explaining that, by sparing Stretch, Leatherface transitions from being a killing machine to what he called "the typical American Graffiti life" where he was looking for love instead of out to kill. Johnson further explained that, because of these newfound emotions, Leatherface felt torn between the 'safety' of his family and this "humane" emotion of love.

Leatherface took on a "rebellious teenage type" mindset in Leatherface: The Texas Chainsaw Massacre III, a contrast to the character's child-like mentality displayed in the original film. Though not explicitly stated in the film, Jennifer Banko's character Babi Sawyer was intended to be Leatherface's daughter, via the rape of one of his victims. This was elaborated upon by Burr as due to Mama Sawyer's inability to bear children, Leatherface had to take up the responsibility to continue the family bloodline. In the film's audio commentary, director Burr offered his thoughts on the character's mental state, theorizing that Leatherface was reduced to a mindless, voiceless individual through a catastrophic injury. (Note: This theory partially inspired the backstory for the character in the prequel film Leatherface.) Burr surmised that his version of Leatherface was not born mentally impaired, but rather fell victim to an injury which destroyed his ability to think and speak, while also disfiguring his face. This concept of Leatherface's origins was explicitly shown in earlier drafts of the script during a scene where Leatherface is unmasked, hinting that his face might have been skinned off at one point in his life.

Northstar Comics' four-part series, loosely based on the third film, delved even deeper into the character's psyche while abandoning the concept of Leatherface as a brain-damaged individual. Described in the comic as mentally impaired from birth, the series explored the origins for his disturbed and violent behavior, revealing Leatherface as someone who was further damaged by his exposure to, what the comic referred to as "[the] bad things" done to him, pushing him deeper into madness and leaving him with the mind of a 'confused and angry child'. Motivated by an inherent need to please his family, and an almost symbiotic connection to his chainsaw, Leatherface is depicted as prone to bouts of self-harm when his actions are criticized by his family and his usefulness comes into question. This behavior is displayed when his chainsaw is damaged during an encounter with a potential victim, causing him to suffer an emotional breakdown, which culminates with Leatherface beating his head against a tree as a form of self-punishment. The short story "Self-Esteem" by James Kisner, published within the series, revealed additional details on the character's mental state, depicting him as prone to hearing voices inside his head. The third film's interpretation of the character as a brutish, violent killer, as opposed to the more "scared child" persona, was highly influential on later iterations of the character after Next Generation.

The Next Generation incarnation marked the most radically different and overtly comedic interpretations of the character. Writer-director Henkel decided upon a satirical approach for the fourth entry in the series, casting a more "androgynous type" actor for the role. Traits only briefly explored in the original film such as the character's cross-dressing, and sexual ambiguity, were implemented to a greater extent in The Next Generation. Instead of being a source of dread as with the previous entries, Leatherface was redefined as a transvestite that dressed in the flesh of female victims, something film scholar Scott Von Doviak described as a "tortured drag queen". The three interchanging masks for the character returned for the film to show off the character's sexually confused and deranged mental state. As actor Jacks explained, each mask represented a different "character" or aspect of Leatherface, which he was attempting to express. Jacks went on to explain that the masks themselves were meant to resemble real-life caricatures of the typical family dynamics, which he claimed was the filmmaker's intention in the original film.

The personality of Leatherface evolved from that of a frightened child and rebellious teenager into a sadistic, rage-fueled serial killer in Platinum Dunes remake series. Although still mentally disabled, Leatherface is depicted as being more unstable and violent than any previous incarnations of the character, also establishing the character as the primary killer and enforcer for the Hewitt family (the timeline's version of the Sawyer family). Screenwriter Scott Kosar wanted to put his spin on the character, developing the notion of the character having been born with skin cancer, which caused him to be bullied and ridiculed throughout his life; transforming him into 'a raging maniac' who was protected and insulated from the outside world by his family. In contrast to other incarnations of the character, which have depicted Leatherface as child-like in his behavior, Brynuarski stated that Leatherface was fully aware of his murderous actions and violent nature to the point where he enjoyed killing, seeing it as a way of revenge for the way he was treated throughout his life and an outlet for his long-suppressed rage. The novelization further explored the character's psyche, depicting this version of Leatherface as more overtly evil than any other incarnation of the character. In a scene that was removed from one of the earlier scripts, Leatherface brutally murders Jedediah, a child and the youngest member of his family, after the latter attempts to stop him from going after Erin.

In the remake's prequel, more information about the character's backstory and psyche expands upon points that were briefly mentioned in the first film. Leatherface is depicted as a victim of a botched abortion, further suffering from a degenerative mental disorder. The character's cancer diagnosis, only briefly mentioned in the previous film, is explored in more detail, revealing the condition of severely disfigured his appearance, accelerated through his penchant towards self-mutilation. According to Brynuarski, Leatherface was tormented as a child due to his appearance which carried on into adulthood, affecting his mind in the process, "In my estimation, Leatherface is like a beaten dog — he was ostracized and ridiculed, and treated harshly by his peers. The psychological damage they inflicted was immense — there's no chance for him." This was further elaborated by Terrence Evans, who played Leatherface's uncle Old Monty, stating, "I think there was a chance Thomas' life could have been different. But the teasing he suffered, coupled with a bad temper, and following Hoyt around like a puppy dog, left room for Hoyt to get absolute control." Bryniarski also described how the Hewitt family's "us or them" mentality had influenced the character's violent and psychopathic nature, further noting the abuse he suffered from the outside world for most his life finally caused his already fragile mind to snap.

A continuation of the Hansen iteration of Leatherface appeared in Texas Chainsaw 3D, a 2013 follow-up to the original that ignored the events of the previous sequels. When developing Texas Chainsaw 3D, co-writers Adam Marcus, and Debra Sullivan felt that there was no real mythology for the character and wanted to create their own mythology for the character. As Marcus stated in an interview: "there was no real mythology for Leatherface, and we wanted to create a mythology. With Leatherface, there was a really broken psychology there, like Frankenstein's monster. For Debra and me, we wanted to tell the story of Leatherface's imprisonment and his reverence for family." For Luessenhop, Leatherface represented not only a source of fear, but also one of pity: "Underneath that mask, there's a very damaged, very abused kid whose mental state never evolved". Describing the character's personality, Yeager referred to the character as someone trained most his life to serve a specific function within his family, as that of the killer. Yeager went on to describe Leatherface as having no self-determination, and someone afraid of the world outside of his family who "did his thinking for him". After the events at the beginning of the film, Leatherface spends the next twenty years 'fending for himself', with his true individual personality finally "beginning to emerge" from beneath the mask, developing his own identity beyond just wearing someone else's face. Yeager admitted that Leatherface had some characteristics that never changed: "He's very childlike still. He plays with stuff like a kid does. His life experience is a bit limited."

The origin story of The Texas Chain Saw Massacre and Texas Chainsaw 3D, reinvented the character, rescinding the original notion of Leatherface always being mentally disabled, instead depicting him as a mentally disturbed young man who later becomes intellectually disabled once exposed to traumatic events that virtually destroys his mind. Screenwriter Seth M. Sherwood described his take on the character as being directly influenced by the mindset described by Hooper and Hansen: "I took my inspiration from interviews, in which they described the psychology of Leatherface. His personality was blank – who he was defined by his mask, and what his family told him to do." Sherwood approached the film as a story of identity, and wanted to delve deeper into why the character became who he was, believing the concept of a Leatherface shaped into a near-mindless monster through events that occur in his life, as opposed to being born that way, to be a more interesting side to the character. As he stated, the young man who would become Leatherface is still 'trying to figure out who he is', having been removed from his birth family, and constantly moved around in foster care. Actor Sam Strike believed that Leatherface was formed by the experiences in the early part of his life; born into a family of psychopaths whose twisted views on the world were impressed upon him at birth, and his later experiences spending most of his childhood in an asylum, describing the character as "a victim of circumstance". This version of Leatherface depicts him as resistant to his family's murderous and sadistic tenancies, while also enduring frequent outbursts of extreme rage. Reflecting on the character's outbursts, Strike felt these moments had contributed to his eventual permanent state as a "rage monster". The character's downfall and descent into madness was also implemented under the control of his family, specifically his mother, whose manipulation of him greatly influenced the character's transformation.

"Leatherface, you can see the human behind the monster. You can see him making mistakes and regretting it and being nervous about it... He's not just a killing machine. You can see what's going on inside him."

— Fede Alvarez on the emotional complexity of Leatherface

The ninth entry's interpretation of the character was noticeably similar to the 'unstoppable evil' of Michael Myers from the Halloween franchise, as filmmakers wanted to emulate the financial success of the 2018 reboot, while also retaining certain elements for the character. One of the main elements retained for Leatherface was his limited mental development, as Garcia described his vision for the character: "I don't think Leatherface is like the rest of us. I don't think he is fully developed as a human being". Alvarez commented on the character's unique personality among horror villains, referring to Leatherface as having a more human aspect to him as opposed to Jason or Michael who was classified as "cold and determined" killers. This iteration of Leatherface also found a mother figure of sorts in the character Ginny or Mrs. Mc, whose kind influence helped his more violent and murderous tendencies to become dormant for several decades. Once this relative peace is shattered following Ginny's death, his rage and murderous urges are reawakened, causing him to once again embrace the beast within. Although incredibly violent, Leatherface is shown to have a deep affection for Ginny, attempting to apply makeup as a way to "connect" with her after her death.

Variants of Leatherface have been represented in various other forms of media, including comic books and video games. Jason vs. Leatherface, a comic book crossover where Jason Voorhees of Friday the 13th meets the Texas Chainsaw family (now identified as the Slaughter family of Sawyerville), represents Leatherface in a childlike emotional state as he is shown to be constantly bullied by his older brother, the Hitchhiker from The Texas Chain Saw Massacre. He befriends Jason, who sympathizes with him. The book emphasizes similarities between the two characters, showing both to be victims of abuse. Despite the abuse he suffers from his family, Leatherface is shown to love them and have a strong loyalty towards them, even protecting them from Jason after he attempts to murder the Slaughter family for their abuse towards him. Following his inclusion in the sixth chapter of the asymmetric survival horror video game Dead by Daylight, promotional listings referred to him as a frightened child trapped in a man's body, seeking appreciation and acceptance. The game's developers described what they viewed as Leatherface's motivation for killing, which they felt that he killed out of fear, unlike typical horror villains. The official manual for the game, describes Leatherface as having no real will of his own, being solely dependent on his family for "security and safety", executing their orders without question.

=== Masks ===
"In a way, there is nothing behind the mask. That, I think, is why he is such a frightening character. The reason he wore a mask, according to Tobe and Kim, was that the mask really determined his personality."

— Actor Gunnar Hansen on Leatherface's masks

One of the defining characteristics of Leatherface, depicted throughout the entirety of the series, has been his face mask(s). As with the character's real-life inspiration, Ed Gein, Leatherface wears masks made from the faces of his victims. In the original film, Leatherface dons three different masks during certain parts of the film, each representing a different personality at a given point of time, as the character was never intended to have any personality beneath those masks. As Hansen wrote, each mask the character wore determined the kind of personality he wanted to emulate, with each of the masks seen in the film representing something important to Leatherface: "He uses the masks to express the context he is in and how he will behave–his state of mind." Elaborating upon this, Hansen has stated that each mask was a way for Leatherface to take on a personality or identity he was incapable of expressing on his own, that if one were to remove his mask he was essentially devoid of any identity or personality. Co-creator Kim Henkel agreed with this assessment, stating that Leatherface "is who he wears", assuming the personality of each of his masks. Tobe Hooper felt that the character's alternating personalities while wearing various masks was comparable to Greek tragedy, as to him, wearing a mask was a form of expressing himself in a way he was incapable of doing on his own.

The three masks seen in the original film were intended to represent a different personality and identity for the character.

Over the years, many critics and scholars have put forth their interpretations on the character's masks. In his essay titled The Aesthetics of Fright, (Note: Dickstein's essay was first published by the American Film Institute, in their quarterly magazine American Film on September 1, 1980.) cultural historian and essayist Morris Dickstein compared Leatherface to Michael Myers of the Halloween franchise. Writing that both characters utilized a mask to obscure their identity, referring to both characters as "murderers in whiteface", while also defining both series as having their own visual signature. This mask-wearing aspect was also viewed by Lorna Piatti-Farnell to be a representation of the evil within humanity, and by literally donning the faces of others, Leatherface can personify his evil inner-nature. In the fourth film of the franchise, Henkel wanted to expand upon the reason for the character's various face masks. When discussing the character, Henkel explained that Leatherface not only chose to wear these different masks to become different people other than himself but also as a way to hide his perceived ugliness. The three masks seen in the film represented three distinct personalities for the character, as effects artist Joshua "J.M." Logan recalled from a conversation with the film's director about the personality of each mask; the Killer mask was worn when taking on the personality of the family's enforcer, the Old Lady mask was the personality of a grandmother taking care of her children, and the Pretty Lady mask was that of someone wanting to be loved.

While filmmakers of each entry in the franchise have maintained the most basic characterization of Leatherface being a blank slate, each proceeding version of the character would completely disregard the concept behind the character's mask(s), instead focusing on the horrific nature of the mask itself. Platinum Dunes' remake series put forth their interpretation of the mask; with the mask now representing, as one observer wrote, all of the primal rage and 'lack of humanity' that existed within the character. Texas Chainsaw 3D actor Dan Yeager described Leatherface as being 'nothing more than a mask', with the masks he wore being 'real' personalities for the character. The masks themselves were also a source of comfort and safety for Leatherface, with makeup artist Mike McCarty describing the "Comfort" mask seen in the film as the equivalent of a "favorite pair of slippers". Filmmakers of the 2013 entry also added the notion that Leatherface stitches each mask onto his face, effectively merging himself with each mask's identity.

=== Cross-dressing and sexual ambiguity ===
Film historians and scholars have highlighted Leatherface's characteristic behavior of cross-dressing, and sexual ambiguity in both the original film and some later entries in the franchise. Cross-dressing and feminine aspects of the character were directly influenced by Gein, who had attempted to 'become a woman' through use of a suit crafted from a woman's torso, just as Leatherface takes on the role of the absent mother during the film's climax. The feminine side to the character was noted by Alexandra Heller-Nicholas and Kim Newman as a mockery of traditional familial roles. As both critics would note, donning his "Old Lady" and "Pretty Woman" masks, Leatherface takes on the maternal role and persona in a seemingly all-male family. Further points of interest, such as the abuse Leatherface sustains from his family while in the feminine persona of the "Pretty Woman" mask, was noted by Heller-Nicholas as a transformation of the character from the family's enforcer into a "gendered victim of male violence".

The fourth film overtly explored the sexual ambiguity of the character and what Henkel called their "feminine and maternal side", as he felt the character's confused sexuality added a layer of complexity to the character's horrific nature. The origins for the character's sexual ambiguity depicted in the original film were considered in the 2017 prequel, with Sherwood revealing that he had originally written in the script where Jedediah is adopted by a family who wanted a little girl, forcing him to wear drag clothing. This plot point did not make it into the final cut of the film after being removed in subsequent drafts. During development, filmmakers even considered leading the audience to believe that Jessica Madsen's character could become Leatherface, "It wasn't a so crazy idea to have regarding the passion Leatherface had for dresses and makeup in the previous movies."

== Legacy ==
=== Cultural impact ===
"What would resonate through the decades long after the release of The Texas Chainsaw Massacre was its most indelible and nightmarish image: a mute, portly psychopath in a slaughterhouse apron, with a thatch of black hair standing up from behind the mask he never takes off, wielding a chainsaw... his bizarre first appearance has some of the primitive shock value of the shower scene in Psycho.

— Critic Owen Gleiberman on the lasting impact of Leatherface

Since his debut in 1974, Leatherface has gained a reputation as an iconic and influential character in the horror genre, responsible for establishing the use of conventional tools as murder weapons, as well as the image of a large, silent, killer devoid of personality. His trademark face mask, and chainsaw have since become instantly recognizable images in popular culture. Several film historians and critics have written that Leatherface has become a template and inspiration for later slashers such as Jason, Michael, and many others. Author Jim Harper noted that Leatherface continues to be an influence on countless slasher villains following the success of the original film, with the many slashers emerging afterwards attempting to replicate the same shock value associated with the character to limited success. One of the reasons for the character's lasting popularity was noted by Hansen as due in part that Leatherface was not entirely evil, in contrast to many slasher villains, in addition to the mystery surrounding the character beyond the masks he wore.

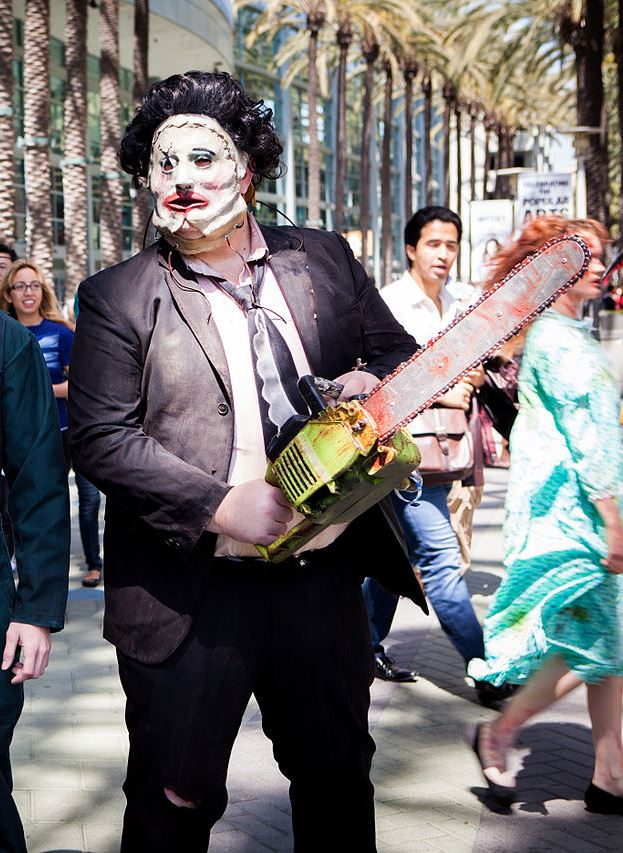
Cosplayer dressed as Leatherface for the 2015 Wondercon.

Leatherface has been listed by critics and several media publications as one of the greatest horror film villains of all time. As online publication Comic Book Resources has argued, the character is made all the more effective by infusing the character with his real life counterpart, Gein, "in a way that Jason or Freddy could never match". Leatherface was placed at No. 1 for media outlet Thrillist's list of "The 33 Scariest Horror Villains of All Time", with the author describing the character as "the purest cinematic distillation of sudden, random, unspeakable terror". American magazine Alternative Press named Leatherface as the most terrifying horror villain of all time, in their "27 Iconic Horror Villains". In a reader's poll for Rolling Stone Leatherface was named No. 6 for 10 best horror villains. He was ranked at No. 15 on Empire's "The 100 Best Horror Movie Characters". George Wales from GamesRadar ranked Leatherface No. 63 for "100 Greatest Movie Villains of All Time", writing "Whilst the most horrific member of the Chainsaw family is surely the desiccated Grandfather, Leatherface is the icon, and with good reason. From his jarring, animal squeals of rage to the shambling gait, he's a monster in man's (and occasionally women's) clothing." Insider placed him at No. 14 in their "50 Greatest Movie Villains of All Time". Film critic Tim Dirks of the film-review website Filmsite.org added Leatherface into his list featuring "The Greatest Movie Entrances of All-Time" based on the scene where the character appears and murders Kirk with a hammer.

Leatherface has been produced and marketed as merchandise over the years, with different companies producing their line often based on the different versions of the character. In 1990 Screamin' Toys produced a model kit where owners could build their own Leatherface statuette. The kit, which came with a standard chainsaw accessory, it also included a customization kit to create the 'Excalibur' chainsaw from the third film. The kit is now out of production and considered extremely rare. In 1998, McFarlane Toys introduced the Movie Maniacs line of figures, with their Series One figures including Leatherface which was released in September of that year. McFarlane produced three additional toy lines of the character, the first in 2001, with the final two in 2004. All of the toy lines the company produced featuring the character was a part of their Movie Maniacs series, the final two based upon the 2004 remake version of the character. A mini-bust of Leatherface, in addition to several action figures was produced by NECA from 2016 to 2019. NECA later debuted an 8-inch retro-style Texas Chainsaw Massacre III Leatherface action figure at Toy Fair 2017. In March 2015, Hollywood Collectibles released a 20-inch action figure, based on Yeager's portrayal of the character. In November 2020, Japanese toy and hobby company Kotobukiya released a gender-bended version of the character, as a part of their "Horror Bishōjo" series of toys, featuring other gender-swapped versions of popular horror characters. From the start of 2021, Sideshow Collectibles produced their own line of Leatherface merchandise, the first being a 12.6 inch statue designed by Kotobukiya.

Several artistic and entertainment mediums have referenced or featured the character throughout the years. The character was one of several horror characters to be included in Universal Studios theme parks Halloween Horror Nights event in a maze titled "The Texas Chainsaw Massacre: Blood Brothers". In 2014, illustrator Travis Falligant included Leatherface in "Scooby-Doo: Lost Mysteries", a parody series of art pieces featuring Scooby-Doo and the gang facing off against various horror villains. A Leatherface-themed jacket, loafers, and boots were designed and produced by Urban Outraged, in a campaign funded by PETA to raise awareness.

=== Influence ===
The character has been referenced and made cameo appearances, in various entertainment mediums. He is referenced several times in Bret Easton Ellis' novel American Psycho. At one point, the novel's protagonist Patrick Bateman mistakenly refers to the character as "Featherhead". Bateman's murder of Christie with a chainsaw in both the novel and the film adaption can be seen as an homage to the character. A popular internet myth centered on the 2004 game Grand Theft Auto: San Andreas has claimed that Leatherface could be found at a special location in the game.

Leatherface has often been referenced or parodied in other films. Leatherface first appeared in the 1988 Merrie Melodies animated short The Night of the Living Duck, as one of the patrons of a nightclub catered to monsters in Daffy Duck's dream. In its 1988 sequel, Sleepaway Camp II: Unhappy Campers, the series' antagonist Angela Johnson dresses up in a Leatherface costume while murdering several people. The 1989 comedy film Transylvania Twist featured a parody of Leatherface, alongside Jason and Freddy Krueger in the film's prologue where they all chase down and are subsequently defeated by a young woman, remarking that they are "amateurs". The 2005 television movie Bloodsuckers depicts a clan of vampires called the "Leatherfaces", as an homage to the character. The title character in the 2005 film Andre the Butcher, was often negatively compared to Leatherface due to his semblance to the character. An adult parody film released in 2008 titled The Texas Vibrator Massacre features a version of the character, using a gas-powered vibrator in place of his signature chainsaw. In the 2009 horror comedy Stan Helsing, the character 'Pleatherface' was designed as a spoof of Leatherface, wielding a leaf blower instead of a chainsaw.

Leatherface has also been referenced and parodied by several television shows. The stop motion animated television series Robot Chicken included Leatherface in four of its comedy sketches. In episode nineteen, "That Hurts Me", Leatherface was with several other horror film icons Jason, Ghostface, Freddy, Pinhead, and Michael Myers as they participated in the reality television show Big Brother. Leatherface later made a brief appearance as a background character in the episode "Botched Jewel Heist" in the sketch "Horror Friends Forever". In "Scoot to the Gute", Leatherface appears in the sketch "American Pickers Texas", where he is a guest star on the reality television show American Pickers. He last appeared in the episode "Jew No. 1 Opens a Treasure Chest", where he is briefly seen alongside Jason in the sketch "Jason's Terrible, Horrible, No Good Day". The South Park episodes "Imaginationland Episode II" and "III" features Leatherface among a vast assortment of other villains and monsters as an inhabitant of the "bad side" of Imaginationland, a world populated by fictional characters.

Many musical artists have made references to Leatherface, with some also citing the character as a major source of inspiration for their works. The 1984 single "Too Much Blood" written by Mick Jagger and Keith Richards from their band The Rolling Stones, was partially influenced by the original film and referenced the character in its lyrics. Inspired by their love for the original film, Frankie Stubbs and Dickie Hammond founded the British punk rock band Leatherface, taking their name from the character. American death metal band Mortician based their 1997 and 1999 songs "Hacked Up for Barbecue", and "Chainsaw Dismemberment" upon the character. American punk rock band Ramones based their song "Chain Saw" in their 1976 album on the character after viewing the original film. The song "Leatherface" by thrash metal band Lääz Rockit was released to promote Leatherface: The Texas Chainsaw Massacre III. Slipknot band member Corey Taylor donned a mask inspired by Leatherface's iconic face mask for the band's 2004 album, "Vol. 3: (The Subliminal Verses)". Song artist Paul Roland paid homage to the character in his 2008 album "Nevermore". Rapper 21 Savage featured the character in the music video of his song "Glock in My Lap".

Several professional wrestlers have used the Leatherface moniker as their gimmick during their wrestling careers. During his brief stint in New Japan Pro-Wrestling from 1989 to 1990, Michael Kirchner would use the moniker Leatherface. Now retired wrestler professional wrestler Dennis Knight also took on the name Leatherface during a brief stint in 1991, going so far as to even dress up as the character during matches. Also in 1993, Canadian wrestler Rick Patterson (wrestler) used the gimmick in Japan when Kirchner was sent to jail for assaulting and breaking a fan's jaw. In 2012, Japanese wrestler Makoto debuted her masked persona "Lady Face" which was inspired by Leatherface. Bray Wyatt, well known for using multiple gimmicks inspired by film and television characters, wore a butcher outfit during matches which were directly inspired by the character.

Leatherface has been a source of inspiration for various fictional characters throughout the decades. Capcom's Resident Evil video game series based the designs of several of their characters on Leatherface. In Resident Evil 4 (2005), enemies such as the Chainsaw Men and Chainsaw Sisters, and more importantly, Dr. Salvador has been noted by observers as being heavily influenced by Leatherface. In Resident Evil 7: Biohazard (2017), the game's Baker family was noted by many as a homage to and inspired by Leatherface and the Sawyer family. Tatsuki Fujimoto, the creator of the hit manga series Chainsaw Man, revealed during the tenth-anniversary celebration of the animation studio MAPPA, that Leatherface and the original Texas Chainsaw Massacre as the main source of inspiration for the series and its titular character. Actor Michael Cerveris compared his character, Professor Pyg, in Gotham, to Leatherface, particularly his mask, apron, and straps. In American Horror Story: Asylum, the character Bloody Face was partially inspired by Leatherface. Makeup artist Christien Tinsley revealed in an interview that the show's creator Ryan Murphy gave Tinsley's makeup department the task of creating something unique and original with Bloody Face that had characteristics of Leatherface in the design whom he referred to as "my Leatherface".

== See also ==
- Chainsaws in popular culture

== Bibliography ==
- Allon, Yoram; Cullen, Del; Patterson, Hannah (December 25, 2002). Contemporary North American Film Directors: A Wallflower Critical Guide (2nd ed.). Wallflower Press. ISBN 978-1-9033-6452-9.
- Billias, Nancy (March 31, 2010). Promoting and Producing Evil (2nd ed.). Rodopi. ISBN 978-9-0420-2940-8.
- Black, Louis; Swords, Collins (February 26, 2018). CinemaTexas Notes: The Early Days of Austin Film Culture. University of Texas Press. ISBN 978-1-4773-1546-0.
- Castleden, Chloe (August 18, 2011). Ed Gein: The Psycho Cannibal. Little, Brown Book Group. ISBN 978-1-7803-3341-0.
- Cartwright, Ryan (September 3, 2021). Peculiar Places: A Queer Crip History of White Rural Nonconformity. University of Chicago Press. ISBN 978-0-2266-9707-9.
- Clover, Carol (March 22, 1993). Men, Women, and Chain Saws: Gender in the Modern Horror Film (1st ed.). Princeton University Press. ISBN 978-0-6910-0620-8.
- Conrich, Ian (December 15, 2009). Horror Zone: The Cultural Experience of Contemporary Horror Cinema. Bloomsbury Academic. ISBN 978-1-8488-5151-1.
- Conrich, Ian; Sedgwick, Laura (November 16, 2017). Gothic Dissections in Film and Literature: The Body in Parts. Springer Publishing. ISBN 978-1-1373-0-3585.
- Dickstein, Morris; Sharrett, Christopher (September 24, 2004). Grant, Barry Keith; Sharrett, Christopher (eds.). Planks of Reason: Essays on the Horror Film (3rd ed.). Scarecrow Press. ISBN 978-0-8108-5013-2.
- Dix, Andrew; Jarvis, Brian; Jenner, Paul (June 2, 2011). The Contemporary American Novel in Context. A & C Black. ISBN 978-1-4411-2297-1.
- Dodson, Will; Woofter, Kristopher (June 1, 2021). American Twilight: The Cinema of Tobe Hooper. University of Texas Press. ISBN 978-1-4773-2285-7.
- Felton, Debbie (July 27, 2021). Monsters and Monarchs: Serial Killers in Classical Myth and History. University of Texas Press. ISBN 978-1-4773-2306-9.
- Fulwood, Neil (October 1, 2003). "Censorship and Controversy". One Hundred Violent Films that Changed Cinema. Batsford. ISBN 978-0-7134-8819-7.
- Funk, Terry (2006). Terry Funk: More Than Just Hardcore. Sports Publishing LLC. ISBN 978-1-5967-0159-5.
- Glasby, Matt (September 22, 2020). The Book of Horror: The Anatomy of Fear in Film. Frances Lincoln. ISBN 978-0-7112-5179-3.
- Grant, Barry Keith (December 1, 2012). Film Genre Reader IV. University of Texas Press. ISBN 978-0-2927-4574-2.
- Hansen, Gunnar (September 23, 2013). Chain Saw Confidential: How We Made the World's Most Notorious Horror Movie. Chronicle Books. ISBN 978-1-4521-1449-1.
- Hantke, Steffen (June 1, 2010). American Horror Film: The Genre at the Turn of the Millennium. University Press of Mississippi. ISBN 978-1-6047-3454-6.
- Harper, Jim (2004). Legacy of Blood: A Comprehensive Guide to Slasher Movies. Critical Vision. ISBN 978-1-900486-39-2.
- Heller-Nicholas, Alexandra (October 15, 2019). Masks in Horror Cinema: Eyes Without Faces. University of Wales Press. ISBN 978-1-7868-3497-3.
- Hutchings, Peter (September 2, 2009). The A to Z of Horror Cinema. Scarecrow Press. ISBN 978-0-8108-7050-5. Archived from the original on September 14, 2023.
- Jaworzyn, Stefan (October 31, 2012). The Texas Chain Saw Massacre Companion. Titan Publishing Group. ISBN 978-1-7811-6497-6.
- Joshi, Sunand (December 30, 2006). Icons of Horror and the Supernatural: An Encyclopedia of Our Worst Nightmares, Volume 2. Greenwood Publishing Group. ISBN 978-0-3133-3782-6.
- Keough, Peter (August 1, 1995). Flesh and Blood: The National Society of Film Critics on Sex, Violence, and Censorship. Mercury House. ISBN 978-1-5627-9076-9.
- Knöppler, Christian (February 28, 2017). The Monster Always Returns: American Horror Films and Their Remakes. Transcript Publishing. ISBN 978-3-8394-3735-3.
- Lanza, Joseph (May 21, 2019). The Texas Chain Saw Massacre: The Film That Terrified a Rattled Nation. Skyhorse. ISBN 978-1-5107-3790-7.
- Macor, Alison (February 22, 2010). Chainsaws, Slackers, and Spy Kids: Thirty Years of Filmmaking in Austin, Texas. University of Texas Press. ISBN 978-0-2927-7829-0.
- Maddrey, Joseph (July 27, 2010). Nightmares in Red, White and Blue: The Evolution of the American Horror Film. McFarland & Company. ISBN 978-0-7864-8274-0.
- Mendik, Xavier (January 1, 2002). Necronomicon Presents Shocking Cinema of the Seventies. Noir Publishing. ISBN 978-0-9536-5644-8.
- Miller, Cynthia; Van Riper, Bowdoin (February 23, 2017). What's Eating You?: Food and Horror on Screen. Bloomsbury Publishing. ISBN 978-1-5013-2239-6.
- Moreman, Christopher; Rushton, Corey (October 10, 2011). Zombies Are Us: Essays on the Humanity of the Walking Dead. McFarland & Company. ISBN 978-0-7864-8808-7.
- Muir, John Kenneth (July 28, 2010). Horror Films of the 1980s. McFarland & Company. ISBN 978-0-7864-5501-0.
- Muir, John Kenneth (October 6, 2011). Horror Films of the 1990s. McFarland & Company. ISBN 978-0-7864-8480-5.
- Newman, Kim (April 18, 2011). Nightmare Movies: Horror on Screen Since the 1960s. A & C Black. ISBN 978-1-4088-0503-9.
- Norman, Jason (November 11, 2014). Welcome to Our Nightmares: Behind the Scene with Today's Horror Actors. McFarland & Company. ISBN 978-0-7864-7986-3.
- Ochoa, George (February 16, 2017). Deformed and Destructive Beings: The Purpose of Horror Films. McFarland & Company. ISBN 978-0-7864-8654-0.
- Piatti-Farnell, Lorna (March 10, 2017). Consuming Gothic: Food and Horror in Film. Palgrave Macmillan. ISBN 978-1-1374-5050-0.
- Peucker, Brigitte (November 30, 2006). The Material Image: Art and the Real in Film. Stanford University Press. ISBN 978-0-8047-5431-6.
- Purcell, Natalie (September 17, 2015). Death Metal Music: The Passion and Politics of a Subculture. McFarland & Company. ISBN 978-0-7864-8406-5.
- Reynolds, R. D. (November 16, 2010). The Wrestlecrap Book of Lists!. ECW Press. ISBN 978-1-5549-0287-3.
- Roche, David (February 6, 2014). Making and Remaking Horror in the 1970s and 2000s: Why Don't They Do It Like They Used To?. University Press of Mississippi. ISBN 978-1-6170-3962-1.
- Rockoff, Adam (October 21, 2011). Going to Pieces: The Rise and Fall of the Slasher Film, 1978–1986. McFarland & Company. ISBN 978-0-7864-6932-1.
- Rombes, Nicholas (February 18, 2005). The Ramones' Ramones. Bloomsbury Publishing USA. ISBN 978-1-4411-0370-3.
- Rose, James (April 16, 2013). The Texas Chain Saw Massacre. Liverpool University Press. ISBN 978-1-906733-99-5.
- Schechter, Harold; Everitt, David (July 4, 2006). The A to Z Encyclopedia of Serial Killers. Simon and Schuster. ISBN 978-1-4165-2174-7.
- Schneider, Steven Jay (October 1, 2009). 101 Horror Movies You Must See Before You Die. Barron's. ISBN 978-0-7641-4124-9.
- Senn, Brian (March 26, 2015). A Year of Fear: A Day-by-Day Guide to 366 Horror Films. McFarland & Company. ISBN 978-1-4766-1090-0.
- Smith III, Joseph (October 21, 2009). The Psycho File: A Comprehensive Guide to Hitchcock's Classic Shocker. McFarland & Company. ISBN 978-0-7864-5486-0.
- Stacy, Jan; Syvertsen, Ryder (August 31, 1984). The Great Book of Movie Villains: A Guide to the Screen's Meanies, Tough Guys, and Bullies. Contemporary Books. ISBN 978-0-8092-5351-7.
- Stobbart, Dawn (October 1, 2019). Videogames and Horror: From Amnesia to Zombies, Run!. University of Wales Press. ISBN 978-1-7868-3437-9.
- Sumner, Don (August 11, 2010). Horror Movie Freak. Krause Publications. ISBN 978-1-4402-0824-9.
- Sykes, Brad (April 4, 2018). Terror in the Desert: Dark Cinema of the American Southwest. McFarland & Company. ISBN 978-1-4766-3132-5.
- Timpone, Anthony (September 15, 1996). Men, Makeup & Monsters: Hollywood's Masters of Illustion and FX. Macmillan Publishers. ISBN 978-0-3121-4678-8.
- Von Doviak, Scott (September 18, 2015). Hick Flicks: The Rise and Fall of Redneck Cinema. McFarland & Company. ISBN 978-0-7864-8212-2.
- Waldron, Abigail (August 17, 2022). Queer Screams: A History of LGBTQ+ Survival Through the Lens of American Horror Cinema. McFarland & Company. ISBN 978-1-4766-4765-4.
- Watt, Mike (January 30, 2013). Fervid Filmmaking: 66 Cult Pictures of Vision, Verve and No Self-Restraint. McFarland & Company. ISBN 978-0-7864-7066-2.
- Weiss, Brett (December 20, 2011). Classic Home Video Games, 1972-1984: A Complete Reference Guide. McFarland & Company. ISBN 978-0-7864-8755-4.
- Weldon, Michael (August 15, 1996). The Psychotronic Video Guide To Film. St. Martin's Press. ISBN 978-0-3121-3149-4.
- West, Brandon (November 19, 2021). At the Edge of Existence: Liminality in Horror Cinema Since the 1970s. McFarland & Company. ISBN 978-1-4766-8140-5.
- Williams, Jessica (October 4, 2017). Media, Performative Identity, and the New American Freak Show. Springer Publishing. ISBN 978-3-3196-6462-0.
- Zinoman, Jason (July 7, 2011). "The Dance of Death". Shock Value: How a Few Eccentric Outsiders Gave Us Nightmares, Conquered Hollywood, and Invented Modern Horror. Penguin Publishing Group. ISBN 978-1-1015-1696-6.
- Balun, Chas (January 1, 1988). "Long Live Leatherface!". Fangoria. No. 70. pp. 49–51. ISSN 0164-2111.
- Bowen, John (November 1, 2004). "Return of the Power Tool Killer". Rue Morgue. No. 42. Marrs Media. pp. 16–22. ISSN 1481-1103.
- Bradford, Matthew (March 1, 2006). "Terror has Big Pixels". Rue Morgue. No. 54. Marrs Media. p. 32. ISSN 1481-1103.
- Carson, Lewis (August 1, 1986). ""Saw" Throu". Film Comment. Vol. 22. pp. 9–12. ISSN 0015-119X. JSTOR 43452244.
- Hansen, Gunnar (May 1, 1985). "A Date with Leatherface". Texas Monthly. Vol. 13, no. 5. Austin, Texas: Genesis Park, LP. pp. 163–164, 206. ISSN 0148-7736.
- Martin, Bob (November 1, 1982). "Tobe Hooper on Texas Chainsaw Massacre and Poltergeist". Fangoria. No. 23. pp. 24–27. ISSN 0164-2111.
- Schow, David (November 1, 1989). "Leatherface: The Texas Chainsaw Massacre 3 Part 1". Fangoria. No. 88. pp. 24–27. ISSN 0164-2111.
- West, Richard (March 1, 1974). "Scariest Movie Ever?". Texas Monthly. 2 (3): 9. ISSN 0148-7736.
- Wooley, John (October 1, 1986). "All in the Slaughter Family". Fangoria. No. 58. pp. 27–29. ISSN 0164-2111.
- Wooley, John (November 1, 1986). "Leatherface in Love: On the set of "The Texas Chainsaw Massacre 2"". Fangoria. No. 57. pp. 24–27. ISSN 0164-2111.
- Bernhard, Sandra; Jacks, Robert (June 30, 1996). "Evil Rampaging Monsters". Reel Wild Cinema. Season 1. Episode 11. Event occurs at 16:20-18:35. USA Network.
- Strike, Sam; Taylor, Lily (October 18, 2017). "Lili Taylor & Sam Strike Stop By To Discuss "Leatherface"". website (Interview). Interviewed by Ricky Camilleri. BUILD series.
- Jon Condit (Interviewer) (October 12, 2006). Bryniarski, Andrew (TCM: The Beginning) Audio Interview (Podcast). Dread Central.
- Michael Felsher (Director) (2006). It Runs in the Family (Documentary). United States: Red Shirt Pictures. Event occurs at 22:20-50:35.
- David Gregory (Director) (2000). Texas Chainsaw Massacre: The Shocking Truth (Documentary). United States: Blue Underground.
- Brian Huberman (Director) (1996). The Return of the Texas Chainsaw Massacre: The Documentary (Documentary). United States: Huberman/Wolf Productions.
- Jim Jam, Johnny Leroy (Interviewers) (June 15, 2017). We talk with Seth M Sherwood on The Horror Basement Podcast 53 (Podcast). TN Horror News.
- Leatherface 2013 (DVD). United States: Lionsgate. 2013.
- Burnham, Mark (September 13, 2022). "Mark Burnham LeatherFace Interview Horror Hound 2022". website (Interview). Interviewed by Robin Nelson. Horror Pop After Midnight.
- Elmore, Bob; Savini, Tom (November 20, 2018). "TOM SAVINI and BOB ELMORE reminisce about making TEXAS CHAINSAW MASSACRE 2". website (Interview). Interviewed by Joe O'Brian. Rue Morgue TV.
- Scotty McCoy (Interviewer) (February 14, 2019). R.A. Mihailoff Interview (Podcast). Gravestone Films.
- Jeffrey Schwarz (Director) (2003). The Saw Is Family: Making 'Leatherface' (Documentary). United States: Automat Pictures.
- Jeffrey Schwarz (Director) (2004). Chainsaw Redux: Making a Massacre (Documentary). United States: Automat Pictures.
- Jeffrey Schwarz (Director) (2007). Down to the Bone: Anatomy of a Prequel (Documentary). United States: Automat Pictures.
- Jeff Burr (Director) (1990). Leatherface: The Texas Chainsaw Massacre III (Motion picture). United States: New Line Cinema.
- Julien Maury, Alexandre Bustillo (Directors) (2017). Leatherface (Motion picture). United States: Lionsgate Films.
- Douglas Goldstein (writer), Matthew Senreich (co-writer and director) (July 10, 2005). "That Hurts Me". Robot Chicken. Season 1. Episode 19. Adult Swim.
- Douglas Goldstein (writer), Zeb Wells (director) (January 28, 2013). "Botched Jewel Heist". Robot Chicken. Season 6. Episode 17. Adult Swim.
- Douglas Goldstein (writer), Tom Sheppard (director) (January 7, 2018). "Scoot to the Gute". Robot Chicken. Season 9. Episode 3. Adult Swim.
- Douglas Goldstein (writer), Tom Sheppard (director) (June 24, 2018). "Jew No. 1 Opens a Treasure Chest". Robot Chicken. Season 9. Episode 16. Adult Swim.
- Trey Parker (writer and director)
  Matthew Faughnan (director) (October 24, 2007). "Imaginationland Episode II". South Park. Season 11. Episode 11. Comedy Central.
- Greg Ford, Terry Lennon (Directors) (1988). The Night of the Living Duck (DVD). United States: Warner Bros. Animation.
- Trey Parker (writer and director)
  Matthew Faughnan (director) (October 31, 2007). "Imaginationland Episode III". South Park. Season 11. Episode 12. Comedy Central.
- David Blue Garcia (Director) (2022). Texas Chainsaw Massacre (Motion picture). United States: Legendary Pictures.
- Kim Henkel (Director) (1995). Texas Chainsaw Massacre: The Next Generation (Motion picture). United States: Columbia Pictures.
- Tobe Hooper (Director) (1974). The Texas Chain Saw Massacre (Motion picture). United States: Vortex.
- Tobe Hooper (Director) (1986). The Texas Chainsaw Massacre 2 (Motion picture). United States: Cannon Films.
- Jonathan Liebesman (Director) (2006). The Texas Chainsaw Massacre: The Beginning (Motion picture). United States: New Line Cinema.
- John Luessenhop (Director) (2013). Texas Chainsaw 3D (Motion picture). United States: Lionsgate Films.
- Marcus Nispel (Director) (2003). The Texas Chainsaw Massacre (Motion picture). United States: New Line Cinema.
- Berry-Dee, Christopher (November 12, 2020). Serial Killers at the Movies. Ad Lib Publishers Ltd. ISBN 978-1-9135-4377-8.
- Harris, Martin (August 9, 2021). Leatherface vs. Tricky Dick: The Texas Chain Saw Massacre As Political Satire. SCB Distributors. ISBN 978-1-9093-9482-7.
- Lowenstein, Adam (July 19, 2022). Horror Film and Otherness. Columbia University Press. ISBN 978-0-2315-5615-6.
- Trunick, Austin (July 31, 2022). The Cannon Film Guide Volume II (1985–1987). BearManor Media. ISBN 978-1-6293-3888-0.
