= Takers =

- Theatrical release poster
- Directed by: John Luessenhop
- Written by: Peter Allen; Gabriel Casseus; John Luessenhop; Avery Duff
- Produced by: Will Packer; Tip "T.I." Harris; Jason Geter
- Starring: Matt Dillon; Paul Walker; Idris Elba; Jay Hernandez; Michael Ealy; Tip "T.I." Harris; Chris Brown; Hayden Christensen
- Cinematography: Michael Barrett
- Edited by: Armen Minasian
- Music by: Paul Haslinger
- Production companies: Screen Gems; Rainforest Films; Grand Hustle Films
- Distributed by: Sony Pictures Releasing
- Release date: August 27, 2010 (United States)
- Running time: 107 minutes
- Country: United States
- Language: English
- Budget: $32 million
- Box office: $69.1 million

Takers is a 2010 American heist action thriller film directed by John Luessenhop and written by Peter Allen, Gabriel Casseus, Luessenhop, and Avery Duff. It stars Matt Dillon, Paul Walker, Idris Elba, Jay Hernandez, Michael Ealy, Tip "T.I." Harris, Chris Brown, and Hayden Christensen. The film follows a group of professional bank robbers who specialize in spectacular robberies. They are pulled into one last job by a recently paroled cohort only to be pitted against a hard-boiled detective and his partner who interrupt their heist.

== Plot ==
Detectives Jack Welles and Eddie Hatcher investigate a daring heist by a group of well-organized bank robbers. Led by Gordon Cozier, the crew consists of John, A.J., and brothers Jake and Jesse Attica. A former member, Ghost, was caught during a previous robbery five years before. In his absence, Jake began a relationship with Ghost's former girlfriend Lilly, who recently accepted his marriage proposal.

After Ghost is released from prison, he reconnects with the crew and proposes a major heist. Only five days from now, $25 million will be transported by a convoy of two armored trucks, with all the money being carried in the first truck.

Dressed as construction workers, the crew hide out underground, while Ghost poses as a police officer, so he can keep an eye out for the trucks. Meanwhile, John is ready to take out Ghost with a sniper rifle from the top of a nearby garage in case the whole thing is a set-up. The crew plan to detonate a blast when the armored trucks pass overhead, causing the trucks to fall underground. However, a cyclist causes the lead driver to stop short and the explosives are detonated too early. The lead driver radios the police, while armed guards pile out of the rear truck.

A gunfight ensues between the robbers in the crater and the guards on the street, until John commandeers the rear truck and rams the lead truck into the crater where the crew cut into it. John and the other robbers pack the cash into bags, and flee through different sewage tunnels which they know to intersect with the subway system.

Welles and Hatcher show up on the scene, and, after learning of the robbers' escape through the sewer system, remember a map of the city subway system from the Russian gang hideout, and deduce that they must be escaping through the stations marked on the map. They rush to the nearest station, where they find Jesse, and a chase ensues, during which Jesse hides his bag of money and is cornered. He shoots Detective Hatcher and escapes while Welles stops to aid his partner, who dies from his wound.

Jesse reconvenes with the rest of the crew at a hotel room. It is now revealed that Ghost had previously cut the same deal with the Russian gangsters to rob the truck but doublecrossed them by going early, effectively cutting them out. Ghost gives the Russians the hotel room number, then escapes out the bathroom window, just before the Russians storm the room and attempt to kill the crew. A.J. sacrifices himself to save the others in the ensuing gunfight, and the rest of the crew are able to kill the Russians and flee the building before the police arrive. Jake and Jesse return home where Jake finds Lilly's corpse. Also, the safe where they kept their secret stash of money has been cleaned out. The police surround their bar and kill both when they make a suicide charge outside.

Gordon and John separate to make their escape, but realize that Ghost intends to take all of their money, which is being held by Scott, a well-connected fence. Ghost sneaks onto Scott's private plane and kills him, taking their laundered money in two suitcases. Gordon and Detective Welles arrive, and a three-way Mexican standoff results in which Ghost hits both Gordon and Welles. As Ghost prepares to finish Gordon off, John arrives and shoots him dead. John recognizes Welles as the same cop who was with the little girl. John and Gordon refuse to kill Welles. A gravely wounded Welles manages to call 911 for help on his cell phone. John and an injured Gordon take the money and drive off with Gordon's sister Naomi in tow, John asks Gordon "Are we good, brother?" and Gordon replies by saying "All signs point to it."

== Cast ==
- Matt Dillon as Detective Jack Welles
- Paul Walker as John Rahway
- Idris Elba as Gordon "G" Cozier
- Jay Hernandez as Detective Eddie "Hatch" Hatcher
- Michael Ealy as Jake Attica
- Tip "T.I." Harris as Delonte "Ghost" Rivers
- Chris Brown as Jesse Attica
- Hayden Christensen as A.J.
- Marianne Jean-Baptiste as Naomi Cozier
- Glynn Turman as Chief Detective Duncan
- Steve Harris as Lieutenant Carver
- Johnathon Schaech as Scott
- Gaius Charles as Max
- Gideon Emery as Sergei
- Zoe Saldaña as Lilli Jansen
- Zulay Henao as Monica Hatcher
- Nicholas Turturro as Franco Dalia
- Andrew Fiscella as Security Chief
- Gino Anthony Pesi as Paulie Jr.
- Isa Briones as Sunday Welles

== Reception ==
On the review aggregator website Rotten Tomatoes, 28% of 113 critics' reviews are positive. The website's consensus reads: "Takers boasts some gripping set pieces and keeps things moving quickly, but its two-dimensional characters, clichéd script, and brazenly derivative plot make it hard to recommend." Metacritic, which uses a weighted average, assigned the film a score of 45 out of 100, based on 20 critics, indicating "mixed or average" reviews. Audiences polled by CinemaScore gave the film an average grade of "B" on an A+ to F scale.

Today called it "almost a good little heist movie", praising the plot twists but criticising the characterization. Author Stephen King, in his end-of-the-year Entertainment Weekly column, listed it at #5 of his best films of 2010. He says that "the climax does strain credulity, but the characters feel real and the armored-car heist is the best action sequence in 2010".

=== Box office ===
The film was number one at the box office during its opening weekend, making $20,512,304. Takers made its U.S. debut on approximately 2,600 screens at 2,206 locations. According to Box Office Mojo, "The heist thriller tripled the start of Armored, and it came in only a bit behind last summer's higher-profile The Taking of Pelham 123. Its initial attendance was also nearly 50 percent greater than similar titles like Dead Presidents, and Street Kings." Takers was made available on Blu-ray and DVD on January 18, 2011.

=== Accolades ===
BET Awards

- 2011: Win – Best Actor – Idris Elba (also for Luther)
- 2011: Nomination – Best Actor – Chris Brown
- 2011: Nomination – Best Movie

Black Reel Awards

- 2011: Nomination – Best Ensemble
- 2011: Nomination – Best Screenplay, Adapted or Original

California on Location Awards

- 2011: Win – Location Team of the Year – Features

NAACP Image Awards

- 2011: Nomination – Outstanding Supporting Actor in a Motion Picture – Idris Elba

== See also ==
- List of black films of the 2010s
