= Hatred of a Minute =

2002 thriller film

- Directed by: Michael Kallio
- Screenplay by: Lisa Jesswein
- Starring: Michael Kallio
- Release date: 2002

Hatred of a Minute is a 2002 thriller film directed by and starring Michael Kallio and produced by Bruce Campbell. Kallio co-wrote the script with Lisa Jesswein who also appears in the movie. Producer Campbell also makes a brief cameo in the film.

== Plot ==
Eric Seaver is a young man that was abused as a child. He has since grown up to become a serial killer with a steady job as a medical transcriptionist, transcribing autopsy reports, and a fiancé. As Eric's killings become more frequent, his stable life is threatened and his rage begins to take over any sanity he had left.

== Cast ==
- Gunnar Hansen as Barry, The Stepfather
- Michael Kallio as Eric Seaver
  - Matthew Fennelly as Young Eric Seaver
- Tracee Newberry as Jamie
- Tim Lovelace as Detective Glenn Usher
- Lisa Jesswein as Sarah Usher
- Michael Robert Brandon as Jack, The Demon
- Jeffrey Steiger as Michael, The Angel
- June Munger as Linda, The Mother
- Colleen Nash as Terry
- Michelle Kuhl as 'Cookie'
- Rebecka Read as Amy
- John F. Gray as Derek

== Production ==
The film was budgeted at an estimated $300,000. The film's title comes from a line of an Edgar Allan Poe poem on which the film's story is based.

== Reception ==
DVD Talk reviewed the film, writing that "There's a lot of promise to be found in Hatred of a Minute, but despite the tears and years that went into bringing the project to fruition, the end result didn't completely gel for me." Ain't It Cool News was critical, as they felt that "the blood and gore in this film barely qualifies as graphic or shocking."
