= Texas Chainsaw 3D =

2013 film by John Luessenhop

- Theatrical release poster
- Directed by: John Luessenhop
- Screenplay by: Adam Marcus; Debra Sullivan; Kirsten Elms
- Story by: Stephen Susco; Adam Marcus; Debra Sullivan
- Based on: Characters by: Kim Henkel; and Tobe Hooper
- Produced by: Carl Mazzocone
- Starring: Alexandra Daddario; Dan Yeager; Tremaine "Trey Songz" Neverson; Tania Raymonde; Thom Barry; Paul Rae; Bill Moseley; Gunnar Hansen
- Cinematography: Anastas N. Michos
- Edited by: Randy Bricker
- Music by: John Frizzell
- Production companies: Millennium Films; Main Line Pictures
- Distributed by: Lionsgate
- Release date: January 4, 2013
- Running time: 92 minutes
- Country: United States
- Language: English
- Budget: $20 million
- Box office: $47.3 million

Texas Chainsaw 3D (stylized on-screen and in home media as Texas Chainsaw) is a 2013 American 3D slasher film directed by John Luessenhop, with a screenplay by Adam Marcus, Debra Sullivan and Kirsten Elms. It is the seventh installment in The Texas Chainsaw Massacre franchise and serves as a direct sequel to the 1974 film The Texas Chain Saw Massacre. The film stars Alexandra Daddario, Dan Yeager, Tremaine "Trey Songz" Neverson, Tania Raymonde, Thom Barry, Paul Rae, Bill Moseley, John Dugan, and Gunnar Hansen in a "special appearance".

The story centers on a woman who, upon discovering that she is adopted, embarks on a road trip with her friends to collect her inheritance, and ends up encountering the serial killer Leatherface.

Texas Chainsaw 3D was released on January 4, 2013, and grossed $47.3 million while receiving negative reviews from critics. A prequel that takes place before the original film, titled Leatherface, was released in 2017.

== Plot ==
In 1973, after her friends and older brother were brutally murdered by a mysterious man in a human skin mask, Sally Hardesty escapes from the murderous Sawyer clan's farmhouse and gives a statement to the police. (Note: As depicted in The Texas Chainsaw Massacre (1974)) The people of Newt, Texas, led by Burt Hartman, arrive and burn down the Sawyer farmhouse in an act of vigilante justice. The arsonists are proclaimed heroes of the community, and the entire Sawyer family is killed. However, an infant with a burn mark on her chest is found by one of the townsmen, Gavin Miller, who promptly murders her mother, Loretta Sawyer. Gavin and his wife take the child into their care and raise her as their own daughter.

In 2012, a woman named Heather discovers that she was adopted after receiving a letter informing her that her grandmother, Verna Carson, has died. Heather, her boyfriend Ryan, her best friend Nikki, and Nikki's boyfriend Kenny travel to her grandmother's home to collect her inheritance. Along the way, the group picks up a hitchhiker named Darryl. Upon arriving, Heather is given a letter from Verna's lawyer, Farnsworth, that she neglects to read. As the group explores the house, they decide to stay the night. Heather and her friends leave to buy food and supplies, leaving Darryl behind to look after the house. Darryl begins stealing valuables and is killed by Leatherface when he unlocks the door to the basement, freeing him.

Heather and her friends return to find the house ransacked. While Kenny is preparing dinner, he goes downstairs to the cellar where Leatherface impales him on a hook, before slicing him in half with a chainsaw. Heather finds Verna's decomposing body upstairs and is attacked by Leatherface in the kitchen, but she manages to escape. Nikki and Ryan draw the attention of Leatherface, while Heather gets in the van and picks up her friends. Leatherface cuts one of the tires with his chainsaw, causing the van to crash, killing Ryan on impact. He chases Heather to a nearby carnival, where Deputy Carl is patrolling the grounds.

While at the police department, Heather begins digging through the files, learning how the Sawyer family was killed and empathizing with them. The sheriff and Burt send an officer to investigate the Carson estate. Over the phone, the officer reports his findings. He finds Nikki hiding in a freezer, but inadvertently shoots her dead before he himself is killed by Leatherface with an axe. Leatherface cuts the skin from the officer's face and uses it to create a new mask. Enraged by the officer's findings, Burt vows to end the remaining Sawyers. Heather leaves the station and meets with her lawyer at a bar. He tells her that Leatherface is her cousin, Jedidiah "Jed" Sawyer, who survived the farmhouse's burning. Heather escapes the bar when Burt finds her and runs into Deputy Carl in his patrol car. As they drive away, Carl reveals himself as Burt's son. He kidnaps her and takes her to the Sawyer family's slaughterhouse and ties her up to lure Leatherface.

Listening over the deceased officer's police radio, Leatherface learns of Heather's location and goes to the slaughterhouse to kill her, but releases her after seeing a Sawyer sigil birthmark on her chest. Leatherface is attacked from behind by Burt and his friend Ollie. Heather takes the opportunity to escape. As Burt and Ollie prepare to throw Leatherface into a meat grinder, Heather returns and kills Ollie, and tosses Leatherface his chainsaw. In the struggle, the sheriff arrives but hesitates to stop Leatherface from killing Burt. Leatherface severs both of Burt's hands with the chainsaw, causing him to fall into the meat grinder.

The sheriff lets Heather and Leatherface go. Afterward, Leatherface and Heather return to the Carson Estate, where Heather reads Verna's letter. It informs her that her real name is Edith Rose Sawyer, that Leatherface lives in the basement behind the metal door, and that he will protect her for the rest of his life, but it also requests that she take care of him in return. After seeing Leatherface burying Verna's body with great care, Heather accepts how his mental state drove him to commit his crimes. She also notes how elderly he's become and accepts him as her only family.

In a post-credits scene, Heather's adoptive parents arrive at the Sawyer estate to visit her, only to be met with a chainsaw-wielding Leatherface as he answers the door.

== Cast ==
- Alexandra Daddario as Heather Miller / Edith Rose Sawyer
- Tremaine "Trey Songz" Neverson as Ryan
- Scott Eastwood as Deputy Carl Hartman
- Tania Raymonde as Nikki
- Shaun Sipos as Darryl
- Keram Malicki-Sanchez as Kenny
- James MacDonald as Officer Marvin
- Thom Barry as Sheriff Hooper
- Paul Rae as Mayor Burt Hartman
- Richard Riehle as Barry Farnsworth
- Bill Moseley as Drayton Sawyer
- Gunnar Hansen as Boss Sawyer
- David Born as Gavin Miller
- Sue Rock as Arlene Miller
- Ritchie Montgomery as Ollie Brown
- Marilyn Burns as Verna Carson (nee. Sawyer)
- Dodie L. Brown as Loretta Sawyer
- David "Bear" Bell as Bear Sawyer
- John Dugan as Grandfather Sawyer
- Dan Yeager as Leatherface / Jeddiah "Jed" Sawyer

== Production ==
=== Development ===
Although The Texas Chainsaw Massacre: The Beginning enjoyed a modest box office success in 2006, the film grossed only half of what its predecessor made. Platinum Dunes was unenthused over the performance and chose not to pursue a third film. Shortly thereafter, Mark Burg and Oren Koules of Twisted Pictures became interested in acquiring the rights to the series from New Line Cinema. Burg and Koules approached The Grudge screenwriter Stephen Susco to draft the prospective film, but rights complications held development up. Twisted Pictures eventually succeeded and closed a multi-picture deal, with Lionsgate distributing. Susco mapped out a trilogy of films that would have been shot on 16mm, the first of which would have explored the Sawyer family's backstory and brought back Sally Hardesty. Carl Mazzocone was on board as producer alongside Burg, Koules, and series creators Tobe Hooper and Kim Henkel, who were both impressed by Susco's pitch. James Wan was slated to direct the first film while Hooper and Neil Marshall were considered to helm the second and third entries respectively. Wan developed concept art of Leatherface and wanted him to wear different masks that represented his emotions. Wan eventually fell off the project in order to direct Insidious. Following Wan's departure, distributor Lionsgate became more involved in the development of the film. The studio mandated a PG-13 rating, a contemporary setting, and for the film to be in 3D; Lionsgate was particularly adamant about removing any depictions of cannibalism, largely because the studio's The Midnight Meat Train bombed at the box office. Susco reconfigured his script to jump forward thirty seven years after an opening sequence where Sally is killed off. Lionsgate rejected the draft and asked for a film that closely adhered to the storyline of the original film.

By October 2010, Adam Marcus, director of Jason Goes to Hell: The Final Friday, and Debra Sullivan were tasked with writing a new script from the ground up. Marcus and Sullivan's screenplay, titled Leatherface 3D, also began exactly where the original film ended, but primarily took place in 1993. Officially titled Texas Chainsaw 3D, John Luessenhop was selected to helm the film in May 2011 with Nu Image on board to co-produce. Production was expected to begin in June of that year. Marcus and Sullivan departed the project after being asked by a producer to perform a rewrite without payment. Luessenhop and Kirsten Elms, scribe of Exeter and Banshee, handled further rewrites. In their revisions, Luessenhop and Elms kept the 1973-set opening but moved the setting from 1993 to present day, yet retained Heather's age of 19. Mother's Day screenwriter Scott Milam consulted on the script and questioned the timeline discrepancy, to which he was told "the audience is not going to care," by Mazzocone.

=== Pre-production ===
In preparation, Luessenhop watched several horror films and documentaries to "get a feel of what had been done before". The director enlisted makeup effects artist Mike McCarty of KNB EFX Group and production designer William A. Elliott. In the recreation of the Sawyer house, the crew strived to replicate it "down to the tiniest detail".

==== Casting ====
Alexandra Daddario was cast as Heather Miller in July 2011, the heir to the Sawyer's mansion. Daddario met with Marilyn Burns in preparation for the role. Tremaine "Trey Songz" Neverson and Tania Raymonde were cast as Heather's boyfriend and best friend respectively that same month. Neverson, the first black actor to star in a leading role in the series, won out after Luessenhop watched his performance at the BET Awards. Scott Eastwood, who was signed on for a trilogy of films, was cast as Carl, the film's male lead. The remainder of the cast was filled out by Keram Malicki-Sanchez, Shaun Sipos, Sue Rock, Thom Barry, Paul Rae, and Richard Riehle.

Dan Yeager was cast as Leatherface, becoming the sixth actor to portray the character on screen. Yeager had minimal acting experience but was picked by Luessenhop for his "severe demeanor". Gunnar Hansen, who portrayed Leatherface in the 1974 original film, was cast as Boss Sawyer. John Dugan reprises the role of Grandpa Sawyer while Bill Moseley was cast as Drayton Sawyer, having previously portrayed Chop Top in The Texas Chainsaw Massacre 2. Marilyn Burns, Sally Hardesty's actress in the first film, took on the part of Verna Carson.

=== Filming ===
Principal photography was underway by late July 2011 in Shreveport, Louisiana with Anastas Michos serving as director of photography. On a budget of $20 million, the film was shot in 3D on RED Epic cameras and lasted for 28 days. Production proved difficult for the cast and crew. With temperatures as high as 114 °F, crew members had to be taken to the hospital while the equipment would constantly overheat. Luessenhop described filming with 3D technology as "cumbersome" and "tedious", and said the film was "shot a lot more like a Hitchcock movie" because of the limitations. Near the end of production, Michos stepped down from the project while the remaining cast and crew members "switched to a 24 hour schedule" in order to complete the film. The film's 3D engineer Markus Lanxinger was suddenly pulled from his work to handle second unit stereography.

=== Post-production ===
Footage from the original film was converted to 3D. Post-production concluded in June 2012. In July, the Writers Guild of America awarded screenplay credit to Adam Marcus & Debra Sullivan and Kirsten Elms, while story credit was given to Stephen Susco and Marcus & Sullivan.

== Release ==
Texas Chainsaw 3D was released theatrically on January 4, 2013, by Lionsgate. The film was originally scheduled for release on October 5, 2012. Luessenhop described the delay as a "business decision", but Bloody Disgusting reported that the film was being recut after receiving an NC-17 rating from the MPAA.

=== Home media ===
On May 13, 2013, the film was released on DVD and Blu-ray/Blu-ray 3D, and included an UltraViolet digital copy of the film along with multiple commentaries and featurettes, an alternate opening and the trailer.

== Reception ==
=== Box office ===
Texas Chainsaw 3D opened concurrently with the wide expansion of Promised Land. The film debuted atop of the box office, ahead of Django Unchained and The Hobbit: An Unexpected Journey, earning $21.7 million. In its second weekend, the film faltered to ninth place behind Lincoln and Parental Guidance, grossing $5.2 million. Steve Barton of Dread Central estimated the film would "peter out" to a total of $40 million. By the third weekend, the film accumulated $1.4 million over the four day Martin Luther King Jr. Day weekend, placing at nineteenth. Texas Chainsaw 3D completed its theatrical run with a worldwide total of $47.3 million.

=== Critical response ===
On the review aggregator website Rotten Tomatoes, 20% of 75 critics' reviews are positive, with an average rating of 3.6/10. The website's consensus reads: "As an ugly and cynical attempt to rebrand Leatherface as horror anti-hero, Texas Chainsaw 3D is a bold move for the franchise." Metacritic, which uses a weighted average, assigned the film a score of 31 out of 100, based on 17 critics, indicating "generally unfavorable" reviews. Audiences surveyed by CinemaScore gave the film an average grade of "C+" on an A+ to F scale, with 63% of moviegoers being under the age of 25.

IGN editor Eric Goldman wrote, "A few fun 3D-aided jump-scares aside, Texas Chainsaw 3D is a generic and laughable attempt to follow the original." Alonso Duralde of The Wrap said "Texas Chainsaw 3D is a dreary slog through the dreadfully familiar." In a one star review for Empire Magazine, Kim Newman wrote that the film "trips like a heroine with a sprained ankle over dumb plot twists, poor performances and inept would-be suspense scenes." Frank Scheck, reviewing for The Hollywood Reporter, wrote "there isn't much to recommend this installment whose main point of originality is omitting the word "Massacre" from the title." Vulture critic Bilge Ebiri criticized the film as "workmanlike" and "generic", but called the climax "a bit more interesting and unpredictable than the usual horror-movie".

For Variety, Joe Leydon labeled the film as a "better-than-average horror-thriller that relies more on potent suspense than graphic savagery or stereoscopic tricks." Writing for Screen Crush, Jordan Hoffman said "It is every 16 year-old's rite of passage to sneak into an R-rated slasher, get grossed out by blood, turned on by boobs and shout back at the screen. To that end, Texas Chainsaw 3D is a worthy claimant to the franchise."

== Prequel ==
Producer Carl Mazzocone and executive producers Mark Burg and Oren Koules obtained the rights to make seven Texas Chainsaw Massacre films, including Texas Chainsaw 3D. Alexandra Daddario, Scott Eastwood, and Thom Barry were signed on for sequels. Under the working title Texas Chainsaw 4, Burg, Mazzocone, and John Luessenhop were shepherding a screenplay. By 2014, the producers' option on the series was close to expiring, leading to the studio hiring Scott Milam to pen the script, based on an outline by Mazzocone.

Millennium Films producer Avi Lerner rejected Milam's draft for being too expensive, and opted for a prequel, simply titled Leatherface, scripted by Seth M. Sherwood and directed by Julien Maury and Alexandre Bustillo. The film, which featured no returning actors from Texas Chainsaw 3D, released on October 20, 2017.
