= Bill Johnson (film and television actor) =

American actor (born 1951)

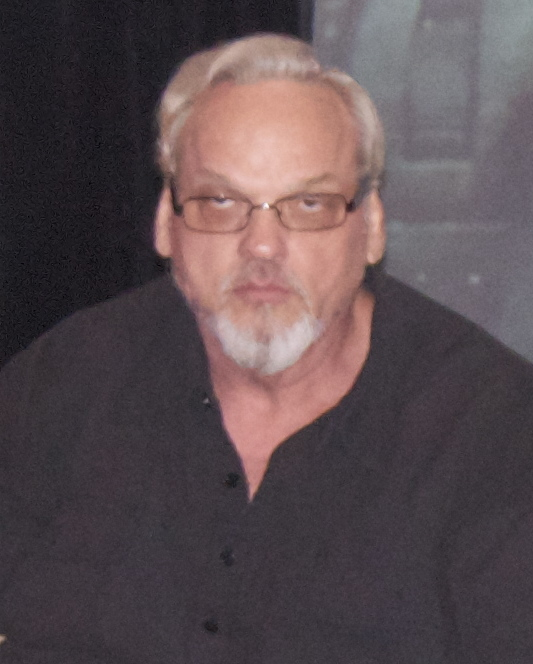
- Johnson in 2012
- Born: December 16, 1951 (age 73); Austin, Texas
- Occupation: Actor

Bill Johnson (born December 16, 1951) is an American actor, known for his role as Leatherface in the 1986 horror film The Texas Chainsaw Massacre 2.

== Career ==
=== Texas Chainsaw Massacre 2 ===
Johnson was chosen to play Leatherface in The Texas Chainsaw Massacre 2. Despite negative reviews from critics due in part to the film relying much more on gore and black comedy than its predecessor, the film has become a cult classic and it gained Johnson notoriety as one of the six actors to have portrayed the character.

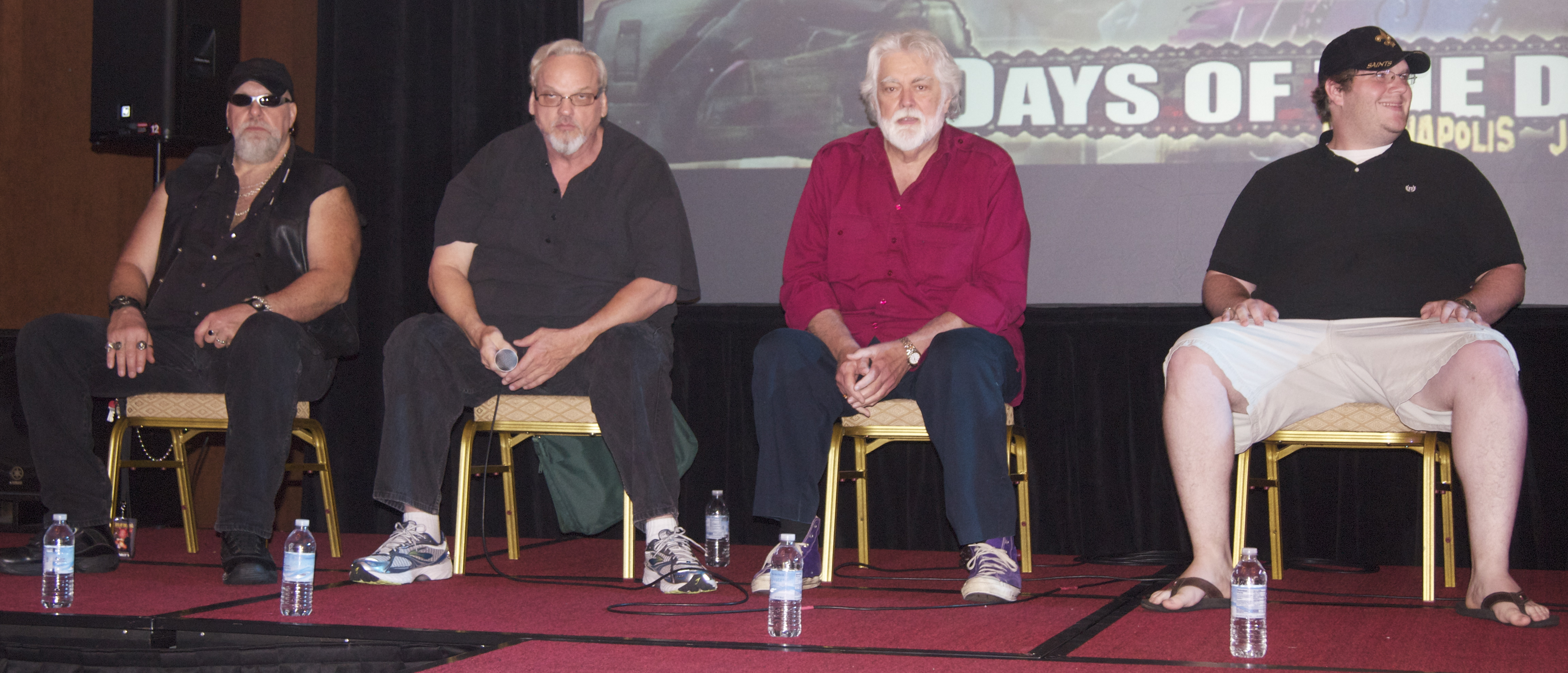
Leatherface actors (Gunnar Hansen, R.A. Mihailoff and Bill Johnson) from The Texas Chain Saw Massacre (1974), The Texas Chainsaw Massacre 2 (1986) and Leatherface: Texas Chainsaw Massacre III (1990) at Days of the Dead Indianapolis 2012.

=== Other projects ===
Johnson also appeared in the Ultima series of role-playing games, as the voice of the Guardian, the final antagonist of the Ultima series. He appears as the Guardian in 5 games: Ultima VII: The Black Gate, Ultima Underworld II: Labyrinth of Worlds, Ultima VII Part II: Serpent Isle, Ultima VIII: Pagan, and Ultima IX: Ascension. He also likes to act in the local theaters.

== Filmography ==
- 1980 Fast Money as Cop (uncredited)
- 1985 Future-Kill as Splatter's Elite Guard
- 1985 Confessions of a Serial Killer as Oil Rig Worker (uncredited)
- 1986 The Texas Chainsaw Massacre 2 as Leatherface
- 1987 The Texas Comedy Massacre as Leatherface
- 1988 D.O.A. as Desk Sergeant (credited as "William Johnson")
- 1988 Paramedics as Caesar "Big Caesar"
- 1988 Full Moon in Blue Water as Stranger #2
- 1988 Talk Radio as Fan #1
- 1997 Redboy 13 as FBI Agent
- 1999 Crosswalk as Ellis Baird (short film)
- 2005 Fall to Grace as Auggie
- 2005 The Fantastic Escape as Troll (short film)
- 2010 Ultimate Guide to Flight as Chess Player
- 2012 Butcher Boys as Mr. Grimm
- 2012 Supernatural Activity as Mike Powers
- 2015 Kill or Be Killed as Hugo
