= John Luessenhop =

American film director and screenwriter

John Luessenhop is an American film director and screenwriter. He graduated from University of Virginia, Georgetown University Law Center, and film schools at UCLA and NYU.

== Career ==
He debuted with the short film Tick, Tick, Tick in 1994. Six years later, he would direct the drama film Lockdown (2000). The film's prison scenes were shot on location at the then-closed down New Mexico State Penitentiary." It closed out the 2001 Hollywood Black Film Festival. Tom Long of The Detroit News wrote of the film, "Despite a low budget and predictable story line, Lockdown has undeniable power to it, fired by some fine performances and a terrifying portrayal of prison life that rings disturbingly true." And Steve Murray of The Atlanta Journal-Constitution, wrote, "though over-the-top and simplistic, the film has a punchy B-movie grit and gusto."

He then directed the crime thriller Takers (2010), starring Matt Dillon, Paul Walker, Idris Elba, Jay Hernandez, Michael Ealy, T.I., Chris Brown and Hayden Christensen. Author Stephen King, in his end of the year Entertainment Weekly column, listed it at #5 of his best films of 2010. He says that, "the climax does strain credulity, but the characters feel real & the armored-car heist is the best action sequence in 2010" (EW 12/3/10 page 26).

In 2013, he helmed the reboot of The Texas Chainsaw Massacre franchise with Texas Chainsaw 3D. Back in 2011, Lions Gate announced that it would be partnering with Nu Image to produce the film, which Luessenhop would direct. Carl Mazzocone acted as producer, with production having been set to begin in June 2011. Mazzocone also announced that the story would pick up where Tobe Hooper's original film ends. Adam Marcus and Debra Sullivan were brought in to write the script; Kirsten Elms and Luessenhop worked on rewrites and script polishing. Neither Twisted Pictures nor Nu Image had a credit on the finished film, which had to be re-cut before release, as it received an NC-17 rating due to excessive gore during its initial submission to the MPAA. Texas Chainsaw 3D was a commercial success, making $47.2 million from a $20 million budget.

== Filmography ==
=== Short film ===
Year	Title	Director	Writer	Notes
1994	Tick, Tick, Tick	Yes	Yes	Credited as A. John Luessenhop

Special thanks

- Santa's Little Helper (1999)
- Please God Someone Normal (2009)
- No Way Out (2011)

=== Feature film ===
Director

- Lockdown (2000)
- Takers (2010)
- Texas Chainsaw 3D (2013)

Writer

- Speed Kills (2018)

Assistant director

- Dirty Money (1994)

Executive producer

- Leatherface (2017)
