= Chain Saw Confidential =

2013 non-fiction book by Gunnar Hansen

Chain Saw Confidential: How We Made the World's Most Notorious Horror Movie
- Author: Gunnar Hansen
- Language: English
- Subject: The making of The Texas Chain Saw Massacre
- Genre: Non-fiction
- Published: 2013, Chronicle Books
- Publication place: United States
- Media type: Print, e-book, audiobook
- Pages: 240 pages
- ISBN: 1452114498

Chain Saw Confidential: How We Made the World's Most Notorious Horror Movie is a 2013 non-fiction book by the actor Gunnar Hansen, who is best known for portraying Leatherface in Tobe Hooper's film The Texas Chain Saw Massacre. The book was first released on September 24, 2013 through Chronicle Books and covers the making of the iconic slasher film.

== Synopsis ==
Chain Saw Confidential covers the making of The Texas Chain Saw Massacre, as well as its release, reception, and marketing. It goes into depth into the film as well as into Hansen's life. The material in the book is taken from several interviews from many of the cast and crew members. The final third of the book looks into the fan reception for the movie and its legacy on the film world.

== Background ==
Hansen began work on Chain Saw Confidential after he was approached by various publishers interested in him writing an autobiography. He disliked the idea of someone writing the book about him and expressed that he would rather write about the making of The Texas Chain Saw Massacre. Another impetus for the book's creation was that several of the cast and crew members had died, making it impossible to gain their perspectives on the film. While gathering material for the book, Hansen tried to interview as many people as possible to get their perspectives. As a result, Hansen received about "100,000 words of transcribed interviews, just for the parts I knew were going to serve the book". Hansen also drew from an earlier autobiography he had written about twenty years prior for his own personal use.

== Reception ==
Critical reception for Chain Saw Confidential was predominantly positive. Dread Central gave the book five out of five blades, stating that it "should be on EVERY Texas Chain Saw Massacre fan's bookshelf, and even horror fans in general who might not be fans of the film should at least check the book out". Starburst magazine also gave a favorable review, echoing the same statements.

A film adaptation of Hansen's book was announced in May 2021, to be produced by Shaun Redick and Yvette Yates Redick. David DuBos is adapting the book as a "dark comedy".
