= Gunnar Hansen =

American actor and author (1947-2015)

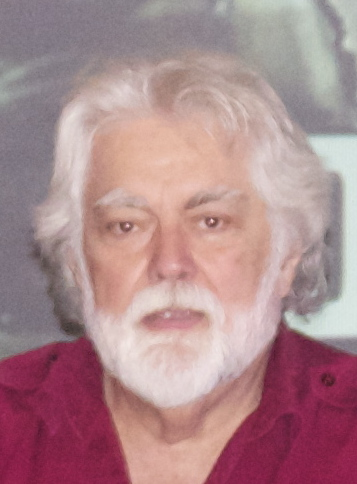
- Hansen at Days of the Dead in Indianapolis, Indiana, 2012
- Born: Gunnar Milton Hansen; March 4, 1947; Reykjavík, Iceland
- Died: November 7, 2015 (aged 68); Northeast Harbor, Maine, U.S.
- Education: University of Texas at Austin
- Occupation: Actor
- Years active: 1973–2015

Gunnar Milton Hansen (March 4, 1947 – November 7, 2015) was an Icelandic-born American actor and author. He played the deranged cannibal Leatherface in The Texas Chain Saw Massacre (1974).

== Early life ==
Hansen was born in Reykjavík, Iceland, to Icelander Skúli Hansen, a dentist, and Norwegian Sigrid Hansen. He moved to the United States with his mother and brother when he was five years old. He lived in Maine until age eleven, when his family moved to Austin, Texas, where he attended Austin High School and the University of Texas at Austin. He majored in English and mathematics as an undergraduate and then went to graduate school in Scandinavian Studies and English.

== Career ==
His first job out of high school was as a computer operator before he began theater work during college. He was also a football player during high school and for a while a bar bouncer. In 1973, just after finishing graduate school, Hansen heard that The Texas Chain Saw Massacre was being filmed in Austin and decided to audition. He got the part of Leatherface, the masked killer in the movie.

After writing (and occasionally editing) for magazines and writing books, Hansen returned to acting in 1988, appearing in the horror spoof Hollywood Chainsaw Hookers. He acted in 20 films thereafter, including Texas Chainsaw 3D where he reprised his role as Leatherface. He stated that he considered his later acting as a side project and continued to write books. He also wrote film scripts and wrote and directed documentary films.

His final film project was a cameo in Death House, which he co-wrote with Harrison Smith.

Hansen was also an author; his nonfiction travel memoir, Islands at the Edge of Time; A Journey to America's Barrier Islands, was published in 1993. In 2013 he wrote the nonfiction book Chain Saw Confidential about the making of and reception for The Texas Chain Saw Massacre.

== Death ==
Hansen died at his home in Northeast Harbor, Maine, of pancreatic cancer on November 7, 2015, at the age of 68. He was cremated and his ashes were scattered into the ocean.

== Filmography ==
Film and television
| Year | Title | Role | Notes |
|---|---|---|---|
| 1974 | The Texas Chain Saw Massacre | Leatherface | |
| 1977 | The Demon Lover | Professor Peckinpah | |
| 1988 | Hollywood Chainsaw Hookers | The Stranger | |
| 1991 | Campfire Tales | Ralph | |
| 1995 | Mosquito | Earl, The Bank Robber | |
| 1995 | Freakshow | Freakmaster | Direct-to-video |
| 1995 | Exploding Angel | Walter | |
| 1996 | Repligator | Dr. Kildare | |
| 1999 | Hellblock 13 | The Executioner | Direct-to-video |
| 2002 | Hatred of a Minute | Barry | |
| 2002 | Witchunter | Michael Jones | Direct-to-video |
| 2002 | Rachel's Attic | Ronald | |
| 2002 | Sinister | The Piper | Short film |
| 2003 | Next Victim | Dr. Howard | (segment "rehabilitation Center") |
| 2004 | The Business | Grandfather | Short film, direct-to-video |
| 2004 | Chainsaw Sally | Daddy | |
| 2004 | Murder-Set-Pieces | The Nazi Mechanic | |
| 2005 | Wolfsbayne | The Elder | |
| 2005 | Apocalypse and the Beauty Queen | Reggie | |
| 2006 | Swarm of the Snakehead | Gunner | |
| 2006 | The Deepening | Dr. Chambers | |
| 2007 | Brutal Massacre: A Comedy | Krenshaw | |
| 2007 | Shudder | Samson | Direct-to-video |
| 2007 | Gimme Skelter | Porter Sandford | |
| 2009 | Won Ton Baby! | Dr. Kurt Severson | |
| 2009 | It Came from Trafalgar | "Tex" Ghoul | |
| 2009 | Reykjavik Whale Watching Massacre | Captain Pétur | |
| 2013 | Texas Chainsaw 3D | Boss Sawyer / Jedidiah Sawyer / Leatherface (archive footage) | Cameo, final role |
| 2017 | Death House | Albert Kenny | Cameo; Posthumous Release |

=== As self ===
- 1984 Terror in the Aisles archival footage
- 1988 Texas Chainsaw Massacre: A Family Portrait
- 2000 Texas Chainsaw Massacre: The Shocking Truth
- 2001 Leatherface Speaks: An Informal Interview with Gunnar Hansen
- 2002 Behind the Attic Door: The Making of "Rachel's Attic"
- 2004 UnConventional
- 2006 Flesh Wounds: Seven Stories of the Saw

== See also ==
- The White Bird
