= Dan Yeager =

American actor

- Born: January 1, 1965 (age 61); Cleveland, Ohio, U.S.
- Occupations: Actor, writer, producer, director, art director

Dan Yeager (born January 1, 1965) is an American actor, art director, writer, producer, and director who is best known for his portrayal of the fictional cannibalistic killer Leatherface in the 2013 American slasher film Texas Chainsaw 3D (2013).

== Early life ==
Yeager was born and grew up in a small farm town south of Cleveland, Ohio. As a child in the 1960s, he enjoyed watching horror and science fiction on television. His parents had too little resources for regular trips to the movie theater, but the family did enjoy an occasional night at the drive-in theater. In his early teens, Yeager saw the movie Boys in the Band. He found a copy of the play, and after reading it, decided he would like to be an actor. By the time he was sixteen, he was watching movies critically and reading books to better understand the medium.

== Career ==
In 1980, the Yeager family moved to Las Vegas. There, Yeager joined The Community Drama Workshop and was cast as an extra in one of the growing number of productions filming in that city. While working on the movie, he met the horror genre actor, Robert Quarry, known for Count Yorga, Vampire, and they became friends. In 1985, Yeager moved to Los Angeles. He managed a cabinet shop in North Hollywood for several years. The economy failed and Yeager was faced with dismissing five employees. He realized his own departure would be less painful, so he resigned in an attempt to let the business keep a few of those family men.

Yeager took the opportunity to at last enter the movie industry. While helping a friend develop a reality television show pilot, Yeager met Carl Mazzacone, producer of Texas Chainsaw 3D which led to the role of Leatherface in the sequel to The Texas Chain Saw Massacre (1974). In 2015, Yeager and one Ron Scott created BADanger Pictures, a film production company.

== Filmography ==
Year	Title	Role	Notes
2011	Metal Heads	Cop 2	
2013	Texas Chainsaw 3D	Leatherface	Also known as Texas Chainsaw
2013	Bananas	Homeless Man	Short film
2014	The Drowned Man	The Drowned Man	Short film
2014	Wing-Nuts	Mountain Man	Short film
2016	Sharknado: The 4th Awakens	Gunnar	Television film
2019	A Wakefield Project	Albert Cross	
2022	The Once and Future Smash	Himself	

== Screenplays ==
- Slaughter Farm, a horror tale.
- The Gospel of George, a short film about loss, survival, resurrection and the human condition.
- Brains, a brain eating disease hits Los Angeles and turns the homeless and body builders into cannibals.
- Zombie Bear Attack, a tale of the lethal hunter and man eater, the undead bear.
