= Mortal Kombat Mobile =

2015 video game

- Developer: NetherRealm Studios
- Publisher: Warner Bros. Interactive Entertainment
- Director: Ed Boon
- Artist: Steve Beran
- Series: Mortal Kombat
- Engine: Unreal Engine 4 (Note: Mortal Kombat X Mobile used Unreal Engine 3.)
- Platforms: iOS, Android
- Release: iOS: WW: April 7, 2015; Android: WW: May 5, 2015
- Genre: Fighting
- Modes: Single-player, multiplayer

Mortal Kombat Mobile (formerly known as Mortal Kombat X, also known as Mortal Kombat X Mobile) is a 2015 fighting game released for smartphones and tablet computers by NetherRealm Studios. A part of the Mortal Kombat series of fighting games, it came out at the same time as the standard Mortal Kombat X release and features similar mechanics and graphics. The game has had a mixed reception among critics.

== Development ==
On March 2, 2015, NetherRealm Studios announced that their mobile division would release an Android and iOS version of Mortal Kombat X in April 2015. The mobile game is described as a "free-to-play fighting/card-battler hybrid" and players would be able to unlock content in the console version of the game by playing the mobile version (and vice versa). The iOS version was released worldwide on April 7, 2015, while the Android version was soft launched on April 21, 2015, in select Asian countries, before a global release.

With the 1.11 update version of the mobile game released on December 6, 2016, Freddy Krueger who appeared as a downloadable character in Mortal Kombat (2011) was added as a mobile-exclusive character using his signature moves and X-Ray attack from the previous game. On the update 1.13, Baraka and Jade were also added in the game as mobile exclusives, using their X-Rays from the console release. Version 1.14 from September 2017 included Takeda, as well as the most recent addition to the ninja cast, Tremor. By October 4, another update was released, featuring Goro and Shao Kahn, followed by a February 2018 update that introduced Bo' Rai Cho and Kintaro, and an October 2018 update introduced console downloadable character Leatherface. In February 2019, the game was renamed Mortal Kombat Mobile with its 2.0 update with a vast overhaul of new features for Mortal Kombat 11. Furthermore, the 2.0 update upgraded its graphics engine from Unreal Engine 3 to Unreal Engine 4. In 2025 Geras and Homelander were added as playable characters.

== Reception ==
=== Critical response ===
Reception

Aggregate score
Aggregator	Score
Metacritic	66/100

At Metacritic, the iOS edition of the game is scored a 66 out of 100, with nine professional reviews, which the site characterizes as "mixed or average".
