= List of horror films of 2018 =

This is a list of horror films that were released in 2018.

== Highest-grossing horror films of 2018 ==
Highest-grossing horror films of 2018
Rank	Title	Distributor	Worldwide gross
1	The Meg	Warner Bros. Pictures	$529 million
2	The Nun	Warner Bros. Pictures	$366 million
3	A Quiet Place	Paramount Pictures	$341 million
4	Halloween	Universal Pictures	$259.9 million
5	Insidious: The Last Key	Universal Pictures / Sony Pictures Releasing	$167.9 million
6	The Predator	20th Century Fox	$160.5 million
7	The First Purge	Universal Pictures	$137.1 million
8	Truth or Dare	Universal Pictures	$95.3 million
9	Goosebumps 2: Haunted Halloween	Sony Pictures Releasing	$93.3 million
10	Hereditary	A24	$90.2 million

== 2018 horror films ==
Horror films released in 2018
Title	Director	Cast	Country	Notes
Along Came the Devil	Jason DeVan	Jessica Barth, Matt Dallas, Bruce Davison	United States	
American Exorcist	Tony Trov & Johnny Zito	Bill Moseley, Falon Joslyn	United States	
Amityville: Mt. Misery Rd.	Chuck Morrongiello, Karolina Morrongiello	Chuck Morrongiello, Karolina Morrongiello, Curtis Wyka	United States	
The Amityville Murders	Daniel Farrands	John Robinson, Chelsea Ricketts, Paul Ben-Victor	United States	
Annihilation	Alex Garland	Natalie Portman, Jennifer Jason Leigh, Gina Rodriguez, Tessa Thompson, Tuva Novotny, Oscar Isaac, Benedict Wong, Sonoya Mizuno	United States; United Kingdom	
Assassination Nation	Sam Levinson	Odessa Young, Suki Waterhouse, Abra, Hari Nef, Bill Skarsgård, Maude Apatow, Colman Domingo, Anika Noni Rose, Joel McHale, Bella Thorne	United States	
Bad Samaritan	Dean Devlin	David Tennant, Kerry Condon, Robert Sheehan	United States	
Bird Box	Susanne Bier	Sandra Bullock, Trevante Rhodes, John Malkovich, Danielle Macdonald, BD Wong, Jacki Weaver, Sarah Paulson	United States	
Boarding School	Boaz Yakin	Luke Prael, Sterling Jerins, Will Patton	United States	
The Cabin	Johan Bodell	Christopher Lee Page, Caitlin Crommett, Erik Kammerland, Thomas Hedengran	Sweden United States	
Cam	Daniel Goldhaber	Madeline Brewer, Devin Druid, Imani Hakim, Patch Darragh	United States	
Children of the Corn: Runaway	John Gulager	Marci Miller, Lynn Andrews, Mary Kathryn Bryant, Jake Ryan Scott	United States	
Climax	Gaspar Noé	Sofia Boutella, Kiddy Smile, Roman Guillermic, Souheila Yacoub	Belgium; France	
The Cloverfield Paradox	Julius Onah	Daniel Brühl, Elizabeth Debicki, Aksel Hennie, Gugu Mbatha-Raw, Chris O'Dowd, John Ortiz, David Oyelowo, Zhang Ziyi	United States	
Da One That Ghost Away	Tony Y. Reyes	Kim Chiu, Ryan Bang, Maymay Entrata, Edward Barber	Philippines	
Day of the Dead: Bloodline	Hèctor Hernández Vicens	Johnathon Schaech, Sophie Skelton, Marcus Vanco	United States; Bulgaria	
Deadtectives	Tony West	Chris Geere, Tina Ivlev, David Newman	United States, Mexico	
Delirium	Dennis Iliadis	Topher Grace, Patricia Clarkson, Callan Mulvey	United States	
The Devil's Doorway	Aislinn Clarke	Lalor Roddy, Ciaran Flynn, Helena Bereen	Ireland	
Escape Room	Peter Dukes	Skeet Ulrich, Sean Young, Hayley Mclaughin	United States	
The Evil Rises	Daniel Florenzano	Bailey La Flam, Michael Glauser, Julian De La Mora, Joe Paulson	United States	
The First Purge	Gerard McMurray	Y'lan Noel, Lex Scott Davis, Joivan Wade, Marisa Tomei	United States	
Gags the Clown	Adam Krause	Lauren Ashley Carter, Tracy Perez, Aaron Christensen	United States	
Ghost Stories	Jeremy Dyson & Andy Nyman	Andy Nyman, Paul Whitehouse, Alex Lawther, Martin Freeman	United Kingdom	
Ghostland	Pascal Laugier	Crystal Reed, Anastasia Phillips, Mylène Farmer	Canada; France	
Goosebumps 2: Haunted Halloween	Ari Sandel	Jack Black, Jeremy Ray Taylor, Madison Iseman, Caleel Harris	United States	
Gonjiam: Haunted Asylum	Jung Bum-shik	Oh Ah-yeon, Wi Ha-joon, Yoo Je-yoon	South Korea	
Halloween	David Gordon Green	Jamie Lee Curtis, Judy Greer, Will Patton	United States	
Head Count	Elle Callahan	Isaac Jay, Bevin Bru, Ashleigh Morghan	United States	
Hell Fest	Gregory Plotkin	Amy Forsyth, Reign Edwards, Bex Taylor-Klaus, Tony Todd	United States	
Hell House LLC II: The Abaddon Hotel	Stephen Cognetti	Vas Eli, Jillian Geurts, Joy Shatz	United States	
Hell Is Where the Home Is	Orson Oblowitz	Angela Trimbur, Janel Parrish, Jonathan Howard	United States	
Hellraiser: Judgment	Gary J. Tunnicliffe	Damon Carney, Randy Wayne, Alexandra Harris	United States	
Hereditary	Ari Aster	Toni Collette, Alex Wolff, Gabriel Byrne	United States	
He's Out There	Dennis Iliadis (as Quinn Lasher)	Yvonne Strahovski, Anna Pniowsky, Abigail Pniowsky, Ryan McDonald, and Justin Bruening	United States	
In Fabric	Peter Strickland	Marianne Jean-Baptiste, Hayley Squire, Leo Bill, Gwendoline Chrisitie	United Kingdom	
Insidious: The Last Key	Adam Robitel	Lin Shaye, Angus Sampson, Leigh Whannell	United States	
Leprechaun Returns	Steven Kostanski	Taylor Spreitler, Pepi Sonuga, Sai Bennett, Linden Porco	United States, Canada, South Africa	
Mandy	Panos Cosmatos	Nicolas Cage, Andrea Riseborough, Linus Roache	United States	
Malicious	Michael Winnick	Bojana Novakovic, Josh Stewart, Melissa Bolona, Delroy Lindo	United States	
Mara	Clive Tonge	Olga Kurylenko, Craig Conway, Javier Botet	United States	
The Meg	Jon Turteltaub	Jason Statham, Li Bingbing, Rainn Wilson, Ruby Rose, Winston Chao, Cliff Curtis	United States; China	Science fiction horror
Mom and Dad	Brian Taylor	Nicolas Cage, Selma Blair, Anne Winters, Zackary Arthur	United States	
Nekrotronic	Kiah Roache-Turner	Ben O'Toole, Monica Bellucci, Caroline Ford	Australia	
The Nun	Corin Hardy	Bonnie Aarons, Taissa Farmiga	United States; Romania	
Open 24 Hours	Padraig Reynolds	Vanessa Grasse, Brendan Fletcher, Emily Tennant	Canada; Serbia	
The Open House	Matt Angel & Suzanne Coote	Dylan Minnette, Piercey Dalton, Sharif Atkins	United States	
Overlord	Julius Avery	Jovan Adepo, Wyatt Russell, Mathilde Ollivier	United States	Science fiction horror
Patient Zero	Stefan Ruzowitzky	Matt Smith, Natalie Dormer, Stanley Tucci	United States; United Kingdom	
Pledge	Daniel Robbins	Zachery Bryd, Aaron Dalla Villa, Zach Weiner, Philip André Botello	United States	
The Possession of Hannah Grace	Diederik van Rooijen	Shay Mitchell, Grey Damon, Kirby Johnson, Stana Katic	United States	
Possum	Matthew Holness	Sean Harris, Alun Armstrong	United Kingdom	
The Predator	Shane Black	Olivia Munn, Boyd Holbrook, Keegan-Michael Key	United States	
Puppet Master: The Littlest Reich	Sonny Laguna & Tommy Wiklund	Thomas Lennon, Udo Kier, Michael Paré	United States	
A Quiet Place	John Krasinski	John Krasinski, Emily Blunt	United States	
Sabrina	Rocky Soraya	Luna Maya, Christian Sugiono, Sara Wijayanto	Indonesia	
Santa Jaws	Misty Talley	Reid Miller, Miles Doleac	United States	
Selfie from Hell	Erdal Ceylan		Canada	
Slender Man	Sylvain White	Joey King, Julia Goldani Telles, Jaz Sinclair, Annalise Basso	United States	
The Strangers: Prey at Night	Johannes Roberts	Christina Hendricks, Martin Henderson, Bailee Madison, Lewis Pullman	United States	
Summer of 84	François Simard, Anouk Whissell, Yoann-Karl Whissell	Graham Verchere, Judah Lewis, Caleb Emery	Canada; United States	
Suspiria	Luca Guadagnino	Tilda Swinton, Dakota Johnson, Chloë Grace Moretz	Italy	
They Remain	Philip Gelatt	Rebecca Henderson, William Jackson Harper	United States	
Truth or Dare	Jeff Wadlow	Tyler Posey, Lucy Hale, Landon Liboiron	United States	
Tumbbad	Rahi Anil Barve	Sohum Shah, Jyoti Malshe, Anita Date-Kelkar	India, Sweden	
Unfriended: Dark Web	Stephen Susco	Chelsea Alden, Adam Bryant, Douglas Tait	United States	
Unsane	Steven Soderbergh	Claire Foy, Joshua Leonard, Jay Pharoah	United States	
Upgrade	Leigh Whannell	Logan Marshall-Green, Betty Gabriel, Harrison Gilbertson	Australia; United States	
What Keeps You Alive	Colin Minihan	Hannah Emily Anderson, Brittany Allen	Canada	Horror thriller
Wildling	Fritz Böhm	Bel Powley, Brad Dourif, Collin Kelly-Sordelet	United States	
Winchester	The Spierig Brothers	Helen Mirren, Jason Clarke, Sarah Snook	United States	
The Witch in the Window	Andy Mitton	Alex Draper, Charles Everett Tacker, Arija Bareikis	United States	
You Might Be the Killer	Brett Simmons	Fran Kranz, Alyson Hannigan, Keith David	United States	
