= Knock-knock joke =

Audience-participation joke

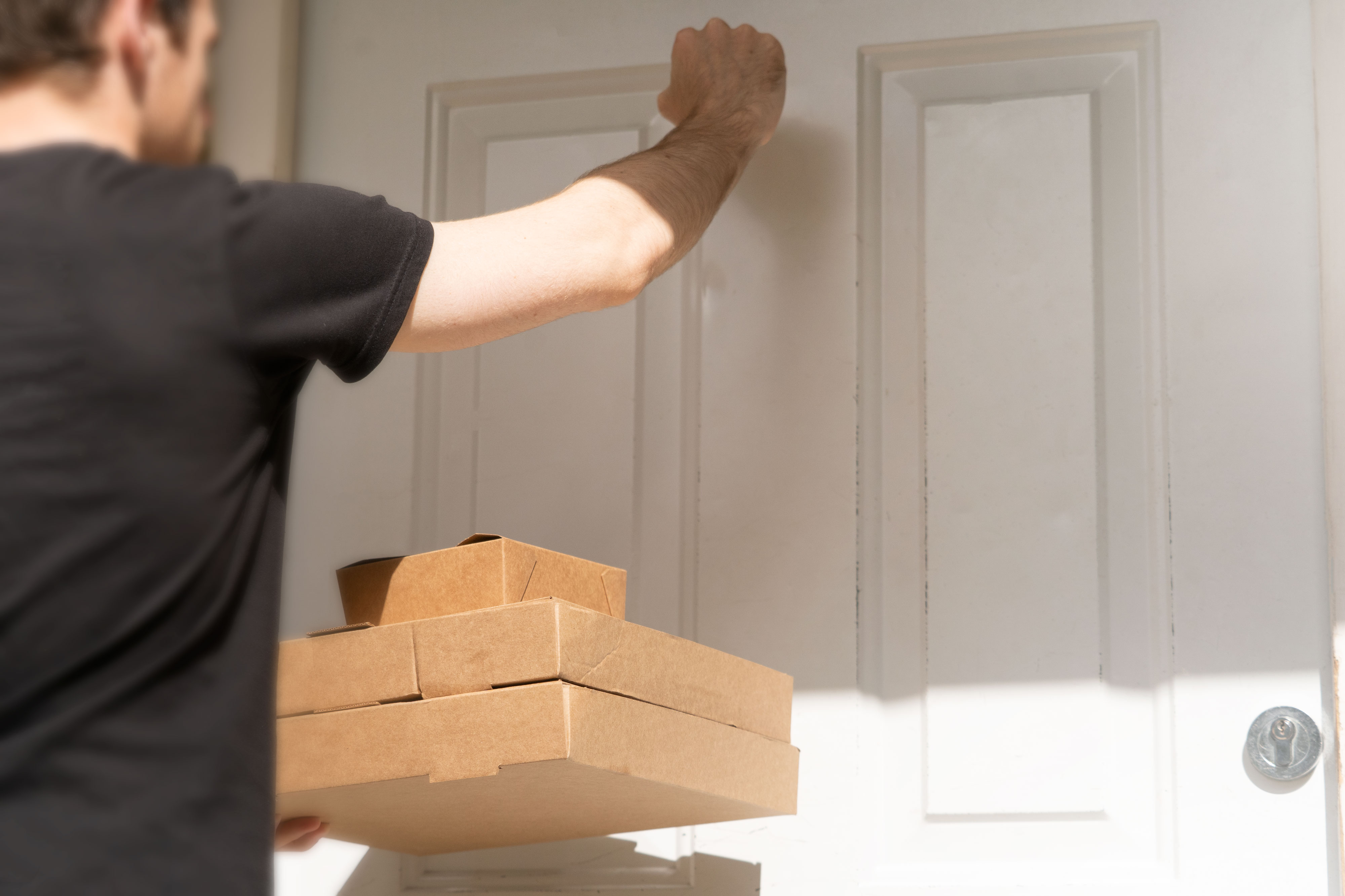
- A person knocking on a door
- Alternative name: Knock-knock
- Type of joke: Word play; Call and response
- Language: English

The knock-knock joke is a structured word play joke that uses call and response. The joke presents a scenario in which the speaker is pretending to knock on the front door of the listener. The speaker initiates the joke by saying "knock-knock", and the listener responds by saying, "Who's there?" The speaker then says a phrase to identify themselves, and the listener repeats the phrase and asks, "Who?" to request more information. The speaker then delivers a punch line, possibly using word play based on the phrase. The first modern knock-knock jokes were told in the United States in the 1930s, and they became a fad in 1936 with widespread use in the United States and the United Kingdom.

== Structure ==
Knock-knock jokes are a type of word play joke, which derive their humor from the conflation of homonyms. The joke is performed cooperatively by the speaker and the listener in a call and response format as they create a scene depicting a visitor knocking at a door. The joke is dependent on the speaker and the listener having previous exposure to the joke's format and enough general and linguistic knowledge to understand what is being referenced in the punchline.

A standard knock-knock joke has five lines of dialogue.

- Line 1 – Introduction: the speaker says, "knock-knock".
- Line 2 – Scripted reply: the listener asks, "who's there?"
- Line 3 – Setup: the speaker says a word or phrase.
- Line 4 – Response: the listener repeats the phrase, followed by the word "who".
- Line 5 – Punch line: the speaker makes a word play joke based on the phrase.

In the first line, the speaker plays the role of someone knocking at the listener's front door by saying "knock-knock". The line is an example of onomatopoeia. It is often spoken with a stylized fall, a type of stylized intonation where the second syllable is said in a lower pitch than the first.

In the second line, the listener's response of "who's there" has them play the role of someone inside their own home as the speaker knocks.

The third line is the point that a person at the door would provide their given name or some other identifier. In the joke, the name does not provide enough information to identify a specific speaker. The joke traditionally uses a name for the third line, but any phrase can be used. If an inanimate object is referenced, it is inferred that the person knocking is a human using the object as a name, rather than the physical object they describe.

The fourth line is normally when the person at home would ask for more information to clarify who is at the door, as a given name or title on its own is not always specific enough to discern a person's identity. In the case of a given name, this can be because the person at home does not know anyone by that name or knows multiple people by that name.

The fifth line breaks from the imagined scenario of a person knocking on a door. Some knock-knock jokes end by repeating the third line, using its phonetic structure as a pun to be the start of a new sentence. In this case, the content of the third line is spoken quickly to blend its sound into the rest of the phrase.

Knock, knock!
Who's there?
Lettuce.
Lettuce who?
Lettuce in!

Other knock-knock jokes take advantage of the phonetic structure of the fourth line, and the fifth line is a response to the newly created phrase spoken by the listener.

Knock, knock!
Who's there?
Tank.
Tank who?
You're welcome!

In both cases, the fifth line effectively changes the meaning of the third and fourth lines.

== History ==
=== Predecessors ===
Dialogue resembling a knock-knock joke appears in the play The Case is Altered by Ben Jonson, written c. 1597, in which the character Juniper says he is not Rachel's father but is willing to become a father with her.

JUNIPER: No, I'll knock. We'll not stand upon horizons and tricks but fall roundly to the matter. [He knocks.]
ONION: Well said, sweet Juniper. Horizons? Hang 'em! Knock, knock!
RACHEL: [Within] Who's there? Father?
JUNIPER: Father? No, and yet a father, if you please to be a mother.

The origin of the knock-knock joke, or the first appearance of the phrase "knock knock, who's there", is sometimes attributed to William Shakespeare for his 1606 play Macbeth. In Act 2, Scene 3, the character of the porter gives a soliloquy about a porter accepting people into hell.

Knock, knock! Who's there, i' the name of
Beelzebub? Here's a farmer, that hanged
himself on the expectation of plenty: come in
time; have napkins enow about you; here
you'll sweat for't.

Knock, knock! Who's there, in the other devil's
name? Faith, here's an equivocator, that could
swear in both the scales against either scale;
who committed treason enough for God's sake,
yet could not equivocate to heaven: O, come
in, equivocator.

Writing in the Oakland Tribune, Merely McEvoy recalled a style of joke from around 1900 where a person would ask a question such as "Do you know Arthur?", the unsuspecting listener responding with "Arthur who?" and the joke teller answering "Arthurmometer!" He compared it to a joke that emerged in the flapper community around 1920 where a woman would ask "Have you ever heard of Hiawatha?", and upon being asked "Hiawatha who?", she would respond with "Hiawatha a good girl ... till I met you."

A variation of the format in the form of a children's game was described in 1929. In the game of Buff, a child with a stick thumps it on the ground, and the dialogue ensues:

Knock, knock!
Who's there?
Buff.
What says Buff?
Buff says Buff to all his men, And I say Buff to you again.

=== Modern knock-knock jokes ===
The exact origin of knock-knock jokes is uncertain, but true knock-knock jokes had emerged in the United States by the 1930s. Knock-knock clubs formed in the Midwestern United States, and swing orchestra performer Vincent Lopez wrote the novelty song "Knock-Knock Song", which incorporated audience call-and-response. By 1936, knock-knock jokes had become a fad. A 1936 Associated Press newspaper article said that "What's This?" had given way to "Knock Knock!" as a favorite parlor game, comparing its sudden rise to that of the novelty song "The Music Goes 'Round and Around". Outlets like The Gridley Herald and The Milwaukee Journal also reported on knock-knock jokes that year as a new parlour game and derided it as uninteresting. The WKBO radio station in Harrisburg, Pennsylvania, helped popularize the format by making frequent jokes using the name of Frank Knox, the Republican vice presidential candidate in the 1936 United States presidential election.

In the United Kingdom, music hall performer Wee Georgie Wood adopted the phrase "knock-knock" as a catchphrase and was recorded in 1936 saying it in a radio play. Meanwhile, a popular knock-knock joke was made at the expense of King Edward VIII.

Knock, knock!
Who's there?
Edward Rex.
Edward Rex who?
Edward Rex the Coronation.

The Edgmont Cash & Carry, a grocery store in Chester, Pennsylvania, used knock-knock jokes in its advertisements and held a contest for the best knock-knock jokes. Another example of a knock-knock joke appeared in The Rolfe Arrow in Rolfe, Iowa.

Knock, knock!
Who's there?
Rufus.
Rufus who?
Rufus the most important part of your house. Is your roof in good shape for the winter? We have roof materials of all kinds.

Fred Allen's 30 December 1936 radio broadcast included a humorous wrap-up of the year's least important events, which included a supposed interview with the man who "invented a negative craze" on 1 April: "Ramrod Dank... the first man to coin a Knock Knock."

After peaking in 1936, knock-knock jokes received greater push-back from critics who saw them as unfunny, pseudo-intellectual, or pathological. Despite this, they remained a popularly known joke format. Knock-knock jokes have since been popularized in other countries, including Australia, Canada, France, Ireland, South Africa, and the United Kingdom. The format was well known in the UK and US in the 1950s and 1960s, and it enjoyed a renaissance after the jokes became a regular part of the badinage on Rowan & Martin's Laugh-In.
