= Pace (narrative) =

Speed at which a story is told

In literature, pace or pacing is the speed at which a story is told—not necessarily the speed at which the story takes place. It is an essential element of storytelling that plays a significant role in maintaining reader interest, building tension, and conveying the desired emotional impact. The number of words needed to write about a certain event does not depend upon how much time the event takes to happen; it depends upon how important that moment is to the story. The pace is determined by the length of the scenes, how fast the action moves, and how quickly the reader is provided with information. A well-paced story effectively balances moments of high intensity and slower-paced sections to create a dynamic reading experience. It is also sometimes dictated by the genre of the story: comedies move faster than dramas; action adventures move faster than suspense. A dragging pace is characteristic of many novels turned down by publishers, and of some that find their way into print but not into the hearts and recommendations of readers. Manuscripts that move too slowly usually discourage readers from reading on. Through various editing techniques, such as cutting unnecessary details, rearranging scenes, or suggesting additions, editors assist in maintaining an engaging pace that keeps readers captivated. Yanna Popova and Elena Cuffari elaborate that as editors they, "explore the participatory structure of a narrative through its temporal unfolding and the specific, non-linear nature of the temporal dynamics of interacting with a storytelling agency". Popova and Cuffari make clear that the way an author unfolds a story through structuring that narrative's tale is essential to the way the audience will interpret it.

== Methods ==
Storytellers have a number of writing tools at their disposal—for example, narration, action, description, and dialogue. When considering how to pace a story, description and narration will move it along slowly, steadily, and easily, while action and dialogue will speed it up. Of all the tools at a writer's disposal, dialogue is the one that most quickly puts the characters and the reader into the present moment, even more so than action.

Pace can be increased through:

- flipping forward past a scene that is in the story but never appears in the book
- skipping steps in a logical sequence of events
- short scenes: editors work with authors to evaluate the order of scenes and chapters, ensuring that the story progresses smoothly. Rearranging scenes can create suspense or build towards a climactic moment, enhancing the overall pace of the narrative.
- frequent paragraphing: by employing frequent paragraph breaks, the narrative becomes more visually appealing and easier to read, allowing readers to navigate through the text more comfortably.
- short sentences: editors may suggest adjustments to sentence and paragraph length to control the rhythm and flow of the narrative. Shorter sentences and paragraphs tend to create a faster pace, while longer ones slow it down, allowing for more detailed descriptions or introspection.
- dialogue: dialogue can be an effective way to build tension and conflict within a narrative.
- action: in certain cases, editors may suggest adding or expanding scenes to introduce more tension or action. Doing so can inject energy into the narrative and propel the story forward, keeping readers engaged.
- active voice and aggressive verbs: through conversations, characters can engage in verbal sparring, disagreements, or confrontations, intensifying the dramatic elements of the story.
- flab-cutting (removal of superfluous words and phrases, and unnecessary adjectives and adverbs)

Pace can be decreased through:

- description and narration
- introspection

=== Weaving ===
While dialogue is the element that brings a story and the characters to life on the page, action creates the movement, and narrative gives the story its depth and substance. Writing a story means weaving all the elements of fiction together. When this is done right, weaving dialogue, action, and narrative can create a beautiful tapestry. Pacing is probably the most common fiction element to pay attention to when considering when to and when not to weave dialogue, narrative, and action. Effective pacing in storytelling has a profound impact on reader engagement and the overall reading experience. When creating a fast-paced conflict scene between two or more people, a writer might do well to consider only dialogue, at least for parts of it. Perhaps the characters have just entered into an argument and the writer wants to speed up the scene. Then there are times when a scene should move slowly, so it is not always best to use dialogue. However, reading slow-moving dialogue is preferable to reading lengthy passages of philosophical narrative. There are scenes in all stories that work best using only narrative or only dialogue or only action. There are no definite rules about when to and when not to weave. To weave well is to find the story's rhythm. Tod Hoffman points out that, "Pace in narrative gauges the movement of a story in a specific direction with respect to time". A well-paced story grabs readers' attention from the beginning and holds it throughout the narrative. By balancing moments of tension, action, and reflection, the pace keeps readers invested, turning pages eagerly. Pace plays a significant role in evoking emotions in readers. Intense, fast-paced sequences can create excitement and suspense, while slower, reflective passages allow for emotional depth and introspection. A carefully crafted pace enhances the emotional impact of key scenes and climactic moments.

=== Variation ===
==== Within a story ====
A good plot is an exercise in proper balance. By staying aware of the scenes' levels of intensity and writing accordingly, a writer can make novels fresh and memorable to their readers. Suzanne Fleishman notes in her book that pacing helps build and sustain narrative tension, a critical element in various genres, including thrillers, mysteries, and horror. By carefully controlling the speed at which information is revealed, tension can be heightened, leading to an increased sense of anticipation and suspense. Beginning writers often give every moment in their stories the same weight. However, in writing fiction, they are in charge of the way time moves. They can pass quickly over what is unimportant, or even skip it entirely. Then they can stretch out the events their readers care about. There is a time for telling and a time for showing. Graeme Dunphy's, “Telling, Showing, and Reminding: Narrative Pace in the Annolied”, explained that the pace of the narrative varies, though, with some of the more comprehensive sections inviting the viewer to enter the scene in a way that is impossible in the more superficial passages. Most stories are paced not too fast, but too slowly. On the other hand, there is nothing less exciting than non-stop excitement, so writers must avoid the monotony of constant action and texture the pace. A story with a monotonous pace can quickly become dull and uninteresting. Skillful use of pacing techniques allows for variation and contrast, introducing moments of rest and calm between intense or action-packed scenes. This contrast provides a more satisfying reading experience and allows readers to appreciate the highs and lows of the narrative. Writing should be done with a consciousness of pacing and tension. In the rising action of the story, reader interest can be maintained by upping the action ante with each succeeding scene. The initial obstacle the hero overcomes should be smaller than the one that follows.

==== Between different stories ====
Different kinds of stories call for different kinds of characters, tension, pacing, themes, and dialogue. A fast-paced action adventure needs fast-paced dialogue in every scene to keep the story moving forward quickly. Likewise, a literary story needs the dialogue to match the pace of the other elements in the story—it needs to move more slowly. Genre stories generally move quickly, employing more dialogue and action and less slow-paced narrative, because they are generally plot-driven rather than character-driven, like literary and mainstream stories. The emphasis is on the action that keeps the plot moving rather than the narrative that keeps the character growing. It pays to know the characters because who they are determines how slowly or quickly they talk. Important information, hints, and surprises can be revealed through character interactions, moving the story ahead. This not only keeps readers intrigued but also keeps the plot moving along without becoming dull or overly dependent on descriptive passages.

== Surf Draculas ==
In narrative criticism, "Surf Dracula" is a pejorative for a type of pacing issue, when a narrative has a backstory for an unimportant part of its universe, or a setup for an unnecessary plot point. It is most often applied to television serials in the current era of TV streaming services, platforms which have caused TV seasons to become shorter and have longer hiatuses; spending time watching a Surf Dracula might be more frustrating to a viewer when its payoff will come much later. The name derives from Twitter user @topherflorence, who tweeted in 2021:

"back in the day if u did a tv show called surf dracula you'd see that fool surfing every week in new adventures but in the streaming era the entire 1st season gotta be a long ass flashback to how he got the surfboard until you finally get to see him surf for 5 min in the [season] finale"

"Surf Draculas" can also refer to whole narratives which are entirely made up of these setups. For example, the first season of Resident Evil, based on the video game series of the same name which depicts a zombie apocalypse, was a setup to that apocalypse; the showrunners planned to depict it in subsequent seasons, but the show was then cancelled.

== See also ==
- Show, don't tell

== Works cited ==
- Bauer, Marion Dane (1992), What's Your Story?: A Young Person's Guide to Writing Fiction, New York: Clarion Books, ISBN 0-395-57781-0
- Bell, James Scott (2004), Write Great Fiction: Plot & Structure, Cincinnati: Writer's Digest Books, ISBN 1-58297-294-X
- Bishop, Leonard (1988), Dare to Be a Great Writer: 329 Keys to Powerful Fiction, Cincinnati: Writer's Digest Books, ISBN 0-89879-464-1
- Hacker, Diana (1991), The Bedford Handbook for Writers (3rd ed.), Boston: Bedford Books, ISBN 0-312-05599-4
- Kempton, Gloria (2004), Write Great Fiction: Dialogue, Cincinnati: Writer's Digest Books, ISBN 1-58297-289-3
- Lamb, Nancy (2008), The Art and Craft of Storytelling: A Comprehensive Guide to Classic Writing Techniques, Cincinnati: Writer's Digest Books, ISBN 978-1-58297-559-7
- Saville, Guy (2013). "Thrillers that sell". In Spring, Michelle; King, Laurie R. (eds.). Crime and Thriller Writing: A Writers' & Artists' Companion. London: Bloomsbury Publishing. pp. 153–155. ISBN 978-1-4725-2393-8.
- Schellhardt, Laura (2008), Screenwriting for Dummies (2nd ed.), Hoboken: Wiley, ISBN 978-0-470-34540-5
- Stein, Sol (1995), Stein on Writing, New York: St. Martin's Press, ISBN 0-312-13608-0
- Turco, Lewis (1999), The Book of Literary Terms: The Genres of Fiction, Drama, Nonfiction, Literary Criticism, and Scholarship, Hanover: University Press of New England, ISBN 0-87451-954-3
