= Leatherface (disambiguation) =

Leatherface is a fictional character from the Texas Chainsaw Massacre franchise.

Leatherface may also refer to:

== Film ==
- Leather Face, a 1939 Hindi-language film from India
- Leatherface, the working title of the original 1974 The Texas Chain Saw Massacre
- Leatherface: The Texas Chainsaw Massacre III, an American horror film and sequel to The Texas Chainsaw Massacre 2
- Leatherface (2017 film), an American horror film; a prequel to The Texas Chain Saw Massacre and Texas Chainsaw 3D

== Literature ==
- Leatherface: A Tale of Old Flanders, a 1916 novel by Baroness Orczy
- Leatherface, a 1958 novel by Ernest Dudley
- Leatherface, a 1991 comic book limited series based on the third Texas Chainsaw Massacre film written by Mort Castle and published by Northstar Comics

== Music ==
- Leatherface (band), a British punk rock band

== People ==
- Claire Lee Chennault, American Military Aviator nicknamed “Old Leatherface”
- Corporal Kirchner, American professional wrestler who wrestled under the ring name "Leatherface" while in Japan
- Krayzie Bone, an American rapper who occasionally uses the nickname Leathaface

== See also ==
- Claire Lee Chennault (1893–1958), nicknamed "Old Leatherface", American major general and aviator, commander of the Flying Tigers
- Leatherhead (disambiguation)
