= Payoff =

Payoff may refer to:

- Bribery, an act of implying money or gift giving that alters the behavior of the recipient
- A payoff dominant equilibrium in game theory
- Payoff matrix or payoff function in a normal-form game in game theory
- Payoff set in set theory
- Payoff (film), a 1991 TV film starring Keith Carradine
- Gomez & Tavarès (AKA Payoff) a 2003 film
- A word for slogan, used in some countries
- Pay off, nautical term
- Paying off, in British Commonwealth contexts, a practice originating in the age-of-sail of ending officers' commissions and of paying crew wages once a ship had completed its voyage; see Ship commissioning#Ship decommissioning
  - Paying off pennant, flown in some navies when a ship is decommissioned; see Pennant (commissioning)
- The result of a setup in storytelling

== See also ==
- The Payoff (disambiguation)
