= Lee Seung-wook =

South Korean actor

- Born: Lee Seung-wook; 12 September 1993 (age 33); South Korea
- Other name: Yi Seung-uk
- Education: Sangmyung University
- Occupations: Actor; model
- Years active: 2015–2022
- Agent: Idea Music Entertainment Korea

Lee Seung-wook (born 1993) is a former South Korean actor and model. He is best known for his roles in dramas and movies such as Wind-Bell and Gonjiam: Haunted Asylum.

== Career ==
Lee made his debut in the movie 4th Place and later he worked in movie Gonjiam: Haunted Asylum. Some days after the film was released, Lee announced his departure from the entertainment industry. He also worked in drama Alchemy of Souls as Park-jin. He mentioned that his decision was for personal reasons.

== Filmography ==
=== Television series ===
Year	Title	Role	Ref.
2019	Wind-Bell	Sang-woo	
2022	Alchemy of Souls	Park-jin (teen)	

=== Film ===
Year	Title	Role	Language	Ref.
2015	4th Place	Lee-yoon	Korean	
2018	Gonjiam: Haunted Asylum	Seung-wook	Korean	
2020	Joseon Fist	Choi Gang-il	Korean	
