= The Devil's Dolls =

2016 American film by Padraig Reynolds

- Theatrical release poster
- Directed by: Padraig Reynolds
- Written by: Danny Kolker and Christopher Wiehl
- Produced by: Padraig Reynolds, Greg Haggart, Danny Kolker and Christopher Wiehl
- Starring: Christopher Wiehl; Kym Jackson
- Cinematography: Adam Sampson
- Edited by: Ed Marx
- Music by: Holly Amber Church
- Distributed by: IFC Films
- Release dates: June 27, 2016 (United Kingdom); September 16, 2016 (United States)
- Running time: 85 minutes
- Country: United States
- Language: English

The Devil's Dolls, originally titled Worry Dolls, is a 2016 American horror film that was directed by Padraig Reynolds. It stars Christopher Wiehl as a detective that must find a way to free his daughter from the influence of cursed worry dolls that cause their owners to commit horrific crimes. The film was first released on June 27, 2016, in the United Kingdom and was retitled for its American release.

== Synopsis ==
The film opens with a young woman, Amber, fleeing from Henry, a serial killer. She is almost caught and murdered, but is saved by the appearance of Matt, a detective that shoots and kills Henry. Matt and his partner Darcy find a box containing four cursed worry dolls, which belonged to Henry. Della, an old woman that raised Henry after his father died, unsuccessfully tries to claim the dolls, which are confiscated as evidence. Matt visits his ex-wife Amy, but unbeknownst to him, their young daughter Chloe finds the worry dolls and takes them for herself. She turns the dolls into necklaces and sells them at her mother's store. Every person that purchases the necklaces will become possessed and violent, committing murder. This includes Chloe herself, as her mother bought one of the dolls for her daughter – resulting in Chloe's hospitalization after killing a dog.

Matt and his partner have been following two worry doll-related crimes so far, finding evidence linking them to Henry. They realize that all of the perpetrators had purchased worry dolls from Chloe and that she had taken them from Matt. Della tells them that the dolls were once capable of strong healing magic, but became cursed after she gave them to a young Henry, as his sorrow and darkness from his father's death corrupted them. Della cautions them that they must bring Chloe and the dolls to her in order to remove the curse. Now aware that they must collect all the dolls, Darcy and Matt begin looking for the final two dolls. They're successful in collecting the third doll and halting a murder, but Darcy dies while retrieving the fourth doll from Ethan, Amy's boyfriend.

After collecting all four worry dolls, Matt brings them and Chloe to Della, only to discover that the old woman has no intention of saving his daughter. She wants to cleanse the dolls so they can become forces of good once more, but doing so would require Chloe's death, due to the presence of Henry's darkness inside her. Unwilling to let this happen, Matt struggles with Della and throws the worry dolls into the fireplace. Della tries to retrieve them but sets herself on fire and runs into a nearby lake to put herself out. Matt is happy to discover that his daughter survived and no longer possessed. Della has also survived.

== Cast ==
- Christopher Wiehl – Matt
- Kym Jackson – Darcy
- Tina Lifford – Della
- Samantha Smith – Amy
- Yohance Myles – Ethan
- Kennedy Brice – Chloe
- Brea Grant – Becca
- R. Brandon Johnson – Todd
- Ashlynn Ross – Amber
- Matty Ferraro – Henry
- Melissa Nearman – Brittany
- Jo-Ann Robinson – Hilda
- Naomi Kyle – Trisha
- Daniel James – Conner
- Emerson Rhinewalt – Young Henry

== Release ==
The film was first released on home video on June 27, 2016 in the United Kingdom, where it was titled Worry Dolls. The title was changed for its release in the United States, to The Devil's Dolls. On September 16, 2016 in the United States the film was given a home video release on VOD as well as a limited theatrical release.

== Reception ==
Critical reception for The Devil's Dolls was mixed. The Los Angeles Times panned the movie, calling it "a pastiche of derivative nonsense that only reminds you of the better films (The Shining, The Exorcist) that it seeks to copy. The acting and special effects are terrible, but unfortunately not terrible enough to be a true camp classic. It's just a listless, routine exercise in religious horror, infused with a whiff of the exotic that tends toward the xenophobic." Michael Gingold of Rue Morgue was also dismissive of the film, as he felt that it was "splattery but unsatisfying".

Fangoria was more positive, rating the movie at three out of four skulls and stating that it was "a great calling card for the director and with a tightly paced script from Danny Kolker and the film's star, Christopher Wiehl, viewers are offered something quite original and shocking."
