= Leatherface (2017 film) =

2017 film by Julien Maury and Alexandre Bustillo

- Theatrical release poster
- Directed by: Julien Maury; Alexandre Bustillo
- Screenplay by: Seth M. Sherwood
- Based on: Characters by Tobe Hooper; Kim Henkel
- Produced by: Christa Campbell; Lati Grobman; Carl Mazzocone; Les Weldon
- Starring: Stephen Dorff; Lili Taylor
- Cinematography: Antoine Sanier
- Edited by: Sébastien de Sainte Croixe; Josh Ethier
- Music by: John Frizzell
- Production companies: Millennium Films; Campbell Grobman Films; Mainline Pictures
- Distributed by: Lionsgate
- Release dates: August 25, 2017 (Leicester Square); October 20, 2017 (United States)
- Running time: 90 minutes
- Country: United States
- Language: English
- Box office: $1.5 million

Leatherface is a 2017 American horror film directed by Julien Maury and Alexandre Bustillo, written by Seth M. Sherwood, and starring Stephen Dorff, Vanessa Grasse, Sam Strike, and Lili Taylor. It is the eighth installment in the Texas Chainsaw Massacre (TCM) franchise, and works as a prequel to The Texas Chain Saw Massacre (1974) and Texas Chainsaw 3D (2013), explaining the origin of the series' lead character.

Following the financial success of Texas Chainsaw 3D, a sequel went into development from director John Luessenhop for a planned shoot in Louisiana, but failed to receive the greenlight to move forward. In favor of avoiding the convoluted continuity of the previous films while going in an unexpected direction, Seth M. Sherwood pitched Leatherface to Millennium Films as a prequel that would follow the titular character in a mentally competent state, enduring trauma that transforms him into the intellectually disabled murderer seen in the previous films. Maury and Bustillo signed on as directors after reading the screenplay, impressed with what they found to be a unique take on the long-running franchise.

Principal photography commenced in Bulgaria in May and June 2015, with locations and sets chosen for their resemblance to the Texas terrain and as homage to the series' previous films. After being temporarily shelved by Lionsgate Films in 2016, the film was made exclusive via DirecTV on September 21, 2017, before receiving a wider release on video on demand and limited theaters, simultaneously, in North America on October 20, 2017. It received generally mixed reviews from film critics, and garnered $1,476,843 worldwide. Lionsgate and Millennium Films lost the rights to produce future Texas Chainsaw Massacre films because of its delay in release.

== Plot ==
In 1955, a couple, Betty Hartman and Ted Hardesty, are driving down a country road when they come across the seemingly wounded child Jedidiah Sawyer. In an attempt to help him, Betty follows him to a dilapidated barn, where his murderous and sadistic family promptly kills her. Her father, Sheriff Hal Hartman, is called to the crime scene, where he is shocked to find his daughter deceased. Despite the efforts of matriarch Verna Sawyer, Hal responds by taking Jedidiah into custody as retribution against the Sawyers, sending him to a mental institution known as the Gorman House Youth Reformery.

10 years later, at the Gorman House, where inmates are renamed to avoid their dangerous families, nurse Elizabeth "Lizzie" White forms a bond with a boy named Jackson. Verna later shows up at the institution with an injunction to allow family visitation, only to be rejected by the director of the facility, Doctor Lang. On the way out, she violates security, causing an escape riot in which many of the nurses and patients are killed. Lizzie is saved by Jackson, who gets her outside with fellow inmate Bud, where crazed escapees Ike and Clarice take them hostage.

The group arrives at a rest-stop diner after ditching their Gorman House uniforms. In an altercation with waitress Tammy, Ike and Clarice begin a murder spree within the diner, which forces them to flee. Hal arrives on the scene and pieces together that one of the escaped inmates is Jedidiah Sawyer. That night, the escapees take refuge in an abandoned mobile home. Believing that everyone is asleep, Lizzie tries to escape, but Ike stops her from doing so. He then becomes engaged in a fight with Jackson and insults Bud, leading to his demise. The next morning, Clarice notices Ike is missing and heads off to find him. She searches the woods and is consequently apprehended by a patrolling Hal. Upon disparaging both him and his dead daughter, he impulsively kills her as the others watch from a distance. Horrified, Lizzie flees with Jackson and Bud in tow. As a police car passes, she screams for help, causing the deputy to notice them.

The deputy attempts to call for backup, resulting in the killing of Bud in the ensuing struggle. An enraged Jackson kills the deputy. Panicking, Jackson and Lizzie steal his vehicle and try to reach safety, but are pursued by the deranged Hal. He opens fire on them, and one of the bullets strikes Jackson's face, while another injures Lizzie, causing the vehicle to careen off the side of the road. Later that night, Lizzie regains consciousness at the barn where Betty was murdered, discovering that she and Jackson are being held hostage by Hal. Planning to kill them, he gleefully tells Lizzie that Jackson is Jedidiah Sawyer. However, the Sawyer family arrives to save the helpless Jedidiah, beating Hal into submission and taking Hal and Lizzie into captivity.

Back at the Sawyer home, Verna stitches the remnants of Jedidiah's face and applies a muzzle to hold them together. She then leads him into a room where his siblings are holding Lizzie and Hal captive. Verna gifts Jedidiah with a chainsaw and Lizzie watches in horror as he bisects Hal to death. As the family celebrates, Lizzie flees into the woods while the Sawyers give chase. She nearly escapes, only to be caught in a bear trap. Lizzie attempts to appeal to Jedidiah's sympathy, while Verna encourages him to kill her to protect their family. Unable to recall events before his injury, Jedidiah begins to listen to Lizzie's pleas, but kills her after she insults Verna. The next morning, Verna burns the evidence of the prior night's events, and the other Sawyers feed the remains of their victims to the pigs. In the house basement, Jedidiah crafts the faces of Hal and Lizzie into a mask, donning it in front of a mirror as he applies lipstick. He smashes the mirror at the sight of his reflection. (Note: The Blu-Ray release contains an option to play the film with a different ending. In this version, Lizzie does not flee into the woods after Hal's death, but is rather cornered upstairs by the Sawyers. When Jedidiah cannot bring himself to kill her, she is knocked unconscious. Jedidiah crafts a mask from her flesh while she is kept alive in the basement.)

== Cast and characters ==
- Stephen Dorff as Texas Ranger Hal Hartman

Stephen Dorff portrays Hal Hartman, an unhinged Texas Ranger who pursues Leatherface and his family for revenge for the murder of his daughter. Dorff described Leatherface as a survival and retribution film for his character, but that "you want to stay clear away from the Sawyers and not confront them." He was given reign by the directors to develop the character the way he envisioned him from reading the script.

- Vanessa Grasse as Elizabeth "Lizzy" White

a nurse working at the Gorman House Youth Reformery who shares a close bond with Jackson.

- Sam Strike as Jedidiah Sawyer / Jackson

Sam Strike plays Jackson, born Jedidiah Sawyer, as one of the four inmates that escape the mental institution, before ultimately becoming the eponymous Leatherface after enduring tragedies that destroy his cognitive stability. Leatherface is a mentally disabled serial killer seen throughout the TCM franchise, known for wearing masks made of human skin, and using a chainsaw and mallet as his signature weapons.
Strike joined the film after reading the script, which he opined was, for a horror film, very character-driven. He felt that there needed to be a contrast between the two sides of the character, to show how a somewhat kind person can become such a killer: "It could happen to anybody. He had it in him because of his mother, but was at the mercy of his environment." Strike integrated aspects from the original film into his performance out of respect, but wanted to give his own interpretation instead of imitating what came before. To make the character's transformation more believable, Strike intentionally tried to gain physical body weight before filming to look physically menacing. He said, "I was trying to eat as much as I could to just feel physically capable. Chainsaws are very heavy, especially ones that are manufactured back in the '50s and '60s."
Strike believed that the character's bursts of rage throughout the film contributed to his final permanent state as a monster. He developed a "battle cry" for whenever Leatherface lost his temper. As a character who was taken from his biological family and put into foster care at an early age, Jedidiah Sawyer was written in the screenplay to have been adopted at an early age by a family wanting a little girl, forcing him to wear drag clothing as a child and foreshadowing his gender ambiguity in the 1974 Texas Chain Saw Massacre. This plot point was absent from the final cut of the film.

- Lili Taylor as Verna Sawyer

Verna is Jedidiah's mother and the matriarch of the Sawyer family, a bloodline of killers from which Leatherface was spawned. According to Taylor, "What attracted me to Leatherface was really talking with the directors... They wanted to do something that was a cross between Terrence Malick, like Badlands, and The Virgin Suicides, I thought 'I'm there' because what I love is this stuff that's happening with people pushing a genre as far as they could push it." Taylor chose to concentrate more on Verna's maternal instincts for her family than her murderous ways, with the character having a denial or compartmentalization about her motherhood and the murder. The film reunites Taylor with Stephen Dorff, who both starred in the 1996 film I Shot Andy Warhol.

- Chris Adamson as Doctor Lang

Chris Adamson's renewed interest in the horror film genre stemmed from his viewing of 1931's Frankenstein. To prepare for his role in Leatherface, he watched The Texas Chain Saw Massacre and the 2003 remake, preferring the former: "It seemed to have an innocence somehow compared to some of the chopped up limb movies which I have sometimes worked on." The character Doctor Lang is the director of the mental institution from which Jedidiah Sawyer and the other inmates escape; the Gorman House Youth Reformery.

- Finn Jones as Deputy Sorells

Hal Hartman's fellow law enforcement officer.

- James Bloor as Ike
- Jessica Madsen as Clarice

Clarice is one of the escaped inmates and was originally intended to be an homage to Chop Top Sawyer, a character from The Texas Chainsaw Massacre 2, but was later developed into her own character. Sherwood stated that the "DNA" of Chop Top is present in Clarice, describing him as his favourite Sawyer. A revisionist take on Chop Top was added due to the diminished role of the family in earlier drafts of the script, but was removed when the filmmakers began to feel that she was more of a "rip-off" than a genuine tribute.
The version of Clarice that appears in the final film emerged when Sherwood imagined "an image of this little girl in pigtails burning down her house with her parents inside". Out of all the performances in Leatherface, Sherwood called Jessica Madsen's the most accurate of what he envisioned while writing. Deciding that Clarice is "much more than just a pyromaniac", Julien Maury and Alexandre Bustillo removed scenes detailing her backstory, such as her weaponising fire for the first time, her addiction for watching moving flames, and exposition on her family's disappearance. As the film begins, it remains ambiguous as to which inmate is actually Jedidiah Sawyer, the eventual Leatherface. Maury and Bustillo even considered leading the audience to believe that Clarice could become the titular character, "It wasn’t a so crazy idea to have regarding the passion Leatherface had for dresses and makeup in the previous movies."

- Sam Coleman as Bud

Sam Coleman portrays Bud, a hulking mental patient that escapes the institution with Jackson, Clarice, and Ike.

Additionally, Julian Kostov portrays Ted Hardesty in the film, the father of Sally and Franklin Hardesty, the final girl and her brother from The Texas Chain Saw Massacre. Although his role is brief, there was going to be an additional scene exploring his family that was removed for budgetary reasons. Nubbins Sawyer, the older brother of Leatherface known simply as "The Hitchhiker" in The Texas Chain Saw Massacre, is played by Dejan Angelov. Lorina Kamburova fills the role of Hal Hartman's daughter, whose death sets the plot into motion, while Boris Kabakchief plays Jedidiah Sawyer in his child years. Other acting credits include Dimo Alexiev, Nathan Cooper, and Nicole Andrews.

== Production ==
=== Concept and development ===
"In a way, there is nothing behind the mask. That, I think, is why he is such a frightening character. The reason he wore a mask, according to Tobe and Kim, was that the mask really determined his personality. So, when the Cook comes home with Sally, Leatherface is wearing the 'Old Lady' mask and his wearing an apron; he wants to be domestic. At dinner he wears a different face – the 'Pretty Woman,' which has make up. Behind the mask, really, Leatherface was very simple -- he killed anything that came along, he obeyed his brothers, he loved his Grandpa."

— Actor Gunnar Hansen on Leatherface's characterisation

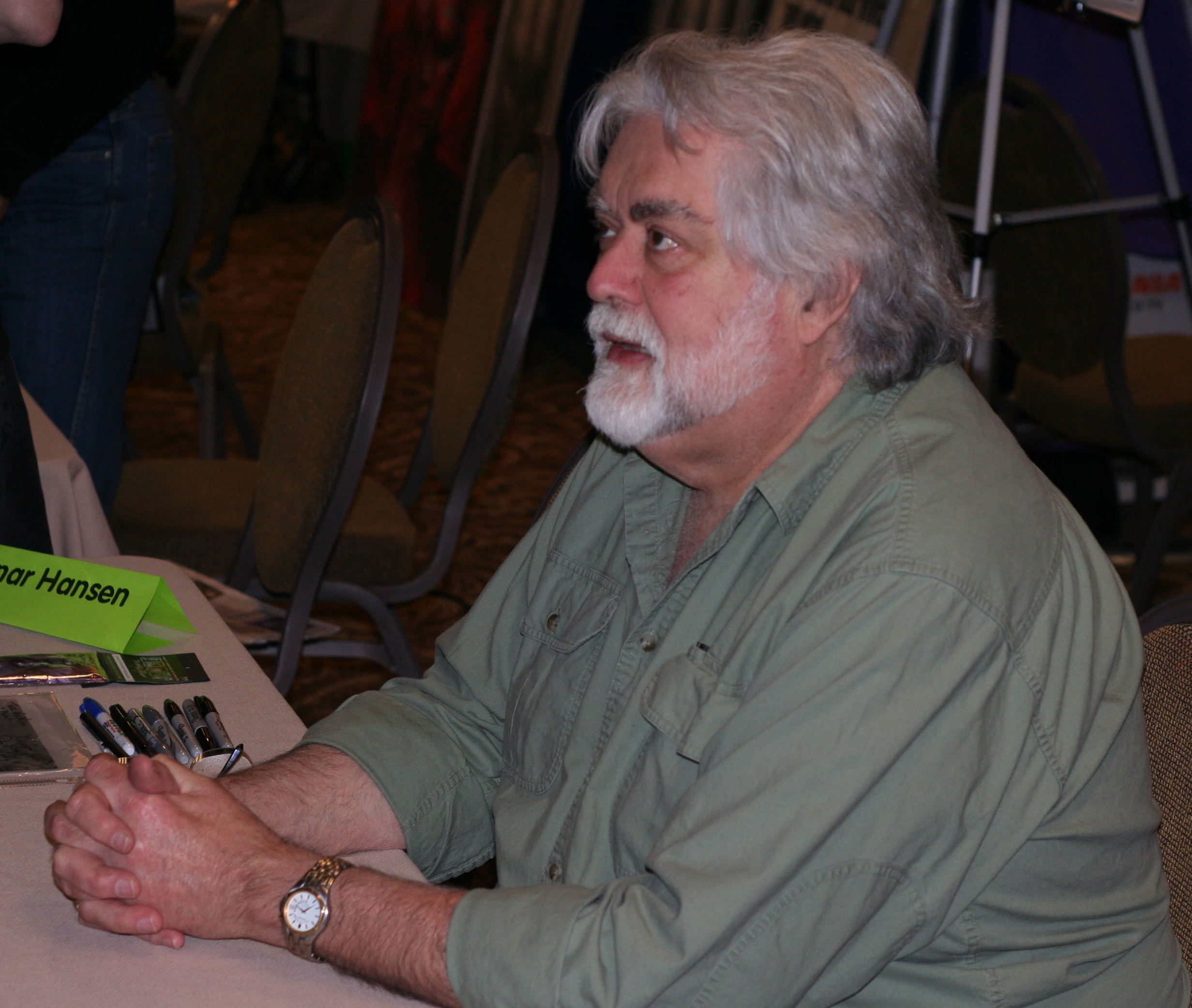
The screenplay's story of man who loses his sense of identity was derived from actor Gunnar Hansen's origination of the Leatherface character.

In January 2013, it was revealed that due to the success of Texas Chainsaw 3D, Millennium Films began planning a sequel film to be called Texas Chainsaw 4 which was expected to begin filming later in 2013 in the state of Louisiana. Millennium Films Chairman Avi Lerner stated that the project was brought to him by Christa Campbell and Lati Grobman and that Millennium had signed on to produce, with Lionsgate distributing the finished product. Executive producer Mark Burg, who developed the sequel's script with John Luessenhop and Carl Mazzocone, clarified that it was prematurely announced and had not been authorised, "The rights are controlled by [Mazzocone] and Main Line Pictures, no matter what Millennium says. Maybe they're looking for something to sell at Berlin, but they have no right to announce this sequel." The idea for a prequel came when Hollywood screenwriter and producer Seth M. Sherwood was given the chance to pitch the film to the studio. Dissatisfied with the inconsistencies of the franchise's continuity, he opted to make a Chainsaw film that wasn't just another sequel to the original: "My pitch was always about doing it completely out of left field and making it different. Luckily, that's the direction they were interested in going as well." The script was approached as a story of identity, based on the statements given by Tobe Hooper and Gunnar Hansen on how the character Leatherface is entirely devoid of personality beyond the masks he wears and what his family commands him to do. Sherwood chose not to have Leatherface be born as mentally disabled, finding the story of a functional person that has their mental capabilities reduced to be more fascinating. Producer Les Whedon stated that the key motives for accepting the pitch were to reinvent the franchise while also showing how Leatherface came to be. Despite the film's explanatory premise, co-director Julien Maury found it important to maintain some of the lead character's mystique, approaching it as "moments from his young years" rather than a breakdown of his entire past.

=== Pre-production ===
On August 13, 2014, it was announced that Sherwood would write the film, under the title Leatherface. On October 31, 2014, Julien Maury and Alexandre Bustillo were hired to direct the film, who admired how different it was from the previous installments: "When we first received the script, it's not everyday that you have the opportunity to see Leatherface on the front page and we were very surprised, in a good way, that the script was taking a different path." Producer Whedon elucidated that the directors were chosen because of their vision and their "edge to their storytelling". Upon signing on to the project, Maury and Bustillo requested rewrites, in which Sherwood gave his support. The general plot structure remained the same, though the directors wanted the screenplay to match their vision. Nearly every death sequence was altered and the ending, originally a mass murder involving Leatherface killing at least thirty people with his chainsaw, was changed, because they found it to be too over-the-top and out-of-character. In March and April 2015, Sam Strike, James Bloor, Stephen Dorff, and Jessica Madsen joined the cast. On May 5, 2015, Lili Taylor was publicised to replace Angela Bettis, who dropped out due to a scheduling conflict. The following day, Vanessa Grasse joined the cast to play Lizzy.

=== Filming ===
"The original Leatherface, Chainsaw 3, took the idea of the backwoods isolation of the original and exploded it tenfold. I always think of the locations of this film—the scrub brush filled badlands and remote roadside outposts as feeling like another world—a dark fairy tale land in some way. I filled my story with similar locations to hopefully capture a similar vibe."

— Seth M. Sherwood

Principal photography began on May 18, 2015, shooting on locations in Bulgaria. The Bulgaria location was used for budgetary reasons, as Millennium Films had a studio in the area. To accommodate the 1960s era in which the film is set, cars modeled after the time period were sent to the filming areas. Sites were also chosen for an aesthetic of wild, open fields and scrubs that resemble the Texas landscape. Sherwood likened the film's visual style to that of an art film, comparing it to "Badlands with gore". In addition to the brutal murders in the screenplay, additional kills were inserted by directors Bustillo and Maury during filming, with the one resulting in Leatherface's flesh mask cited by Sherwood as his personal favourite. Practical effects were primarily used to bring the killings, corpses, and gore to life; much of the budget was spent on building a lifelike cow carcass, intended to seem realistic. The crew utilised computer-generated imagery as necessary, albeit to a much lesser extent. Two chainsaws were created for filming, a rubber chainsaw and an electric chainsaw. The rubber chainsaw was a variant used for the safety of the actors, with the intention of only using the computer-generated effects when needed. As such, a lifelike dummy of Doctor Lang's bloodied corpse was also used in the scenes taking place after his death. Leatherface was made intentionally graphic in response to fan criticisms of Texas Chainsaw 3D lacking sufficient violence. Lati Globman said on the matter, "Gore is not always the point in horror movies, although there will be plenty, it needs to be psychologically challenging and twisted." While five of the seven TCM films have been shot in Texas, one in California and one in Louisiana, Bulgarian filming marks the first time one has been shot outside the United States. Filming continued through June 2015, lasting a sum of twenty-seven days.

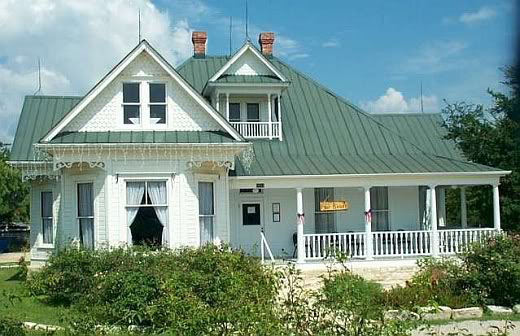
The 1974 Texas Chain Saw Massacre house, located in Kingsland, Texas, was replicated as a prominent location for Leatherface. A previous duplicate was created for the 2013 sequel Texas Chainsaw 3D.

Sherwood wrote some of the film's locations into the script as homage to Leatherface: The Texas Chainsaw Massacre III. The fictional Sawyer farm is a key location in Leatherface, which was rebuilt to accurately resemble its appearance in the first Texas Chain Saw Massacre. The farm was originally going to be used sparingly, until Sherwood discussed the matter with directors Maury and Bustillo, who felt that if the iconic location was going to be built, it should be used to a larger extent. The third act, largely set at the farmhouse, was consequently rearranged from its placement in the script. The Sawyer homestead was adduced by cinematographer Antoine Sanier as being particularly rousing to shoot, because it was a real location that he felt was always partially dark or hidden in the previous films.

=== Fictional continuity ===
Serving as a direct prequel to The Texas Chain Saw Massacre, Leatherface was written by Sherwood to also act as a prelude to the series as a whole. He intentionally distanced the film from The Texas Chainsaw Massacre remake and its prequel The Texas Chainsaw Massacre: The Beginning, while respecting the fictional events of the original film and its various sequels. Certain character names, such as Drayton, Nubbins, and the Sawyer surname, were pulled from The Texas Chainsaw Massacre 2. The creation of the deranged lawman Hal Hartman was inspired by Lefty Enright, a Texas Ranger that appeared in the second film. Hal Hartman is the father of Burt Hartman, a vigilante character that first appeared in Texas Chainsaw 3D. The character Verna Sawyer (Lili Taylor) was played by Marilyn Burns in Texas Chainsaw 3D. Sherwood confirmed that the Texas Chainsaw film canon made by Lionsgate Pictures and Millennium Films consists of, chronologically, Leatherface, The Texas Chain Saw Massacre, and Texas Chainsaw 3D. He intended Leatherface to be accessible to viewers who had never seen the previous films, so that they could watch the series in the order of the timeline without being confused.

== Release ==
Leatherface was originally slated for a 2016 release, which it did not meet. Despite being completed, it was temporarily shelved by Lionsgate Films. Sherwood speculated that the studio might have been afraid that they wouldn't make back their investment after another film underperformed, but admitted that he had no concrete explanation for the delay: "In a strange way, I started to romanticize the idea it became some legendary lost film. It would be coveted – something spoken about, something people would try to contrive some way of seeing, something that would show up on a tired unused media at a convention in 50 years." A film titled Leatherface received a direct-to-video release from Lightning Pictures in the United Kingdom in January 2017, featuring a masked chainsaw-brandishing figure on the home video cover. However, this film was not the Texas Chain Saw Massacre prequel, but rather a re-packaging of the unrelated Playing With Dolls: Bloodlust. The home media release was criticised by the press as an attempt to mislead consumers into believing it was the TCM prequel, with William Bibbiani scrutising on Blumhouse.com that "It's not uncommon for horror movies to pick up new titles to capitalize on various trends, but it goes beyond mockbusters, which try to trick you into thinking it's the real deal, and simply takes the title of an anticipated horror movie." Playing With Dolls director Rene Perez apologised for the title change, stating that it was the distributor's decision to use the Leatherface title.

In May 2017, producer Christa Campbell stated that the prequel would be released in October 2017. It premiered at FrightFest 2017 on August 25, followed by an exclusive release through the DirecTV satellite service on September 21, and wide distribution via video on demand and a limited theatrical run coinciding on October 20, making a reported total of $1,476,843 at the worldwide box office. It was also selected as programming for the 2017 Screamfest Horror Film Festival, which ran from October 10 to October 19, 2017, at the TCL Chinese Theatre, as well as the Nightmares Film Festival on October 19. The motion picture was published on home video platforms, specifically Blu-ray, DVD, and digital media, on December 19, 2017. Additional Blu-ray features included deleted scenes, a Making of featurette, and an alternate ending.

== Critical response ==
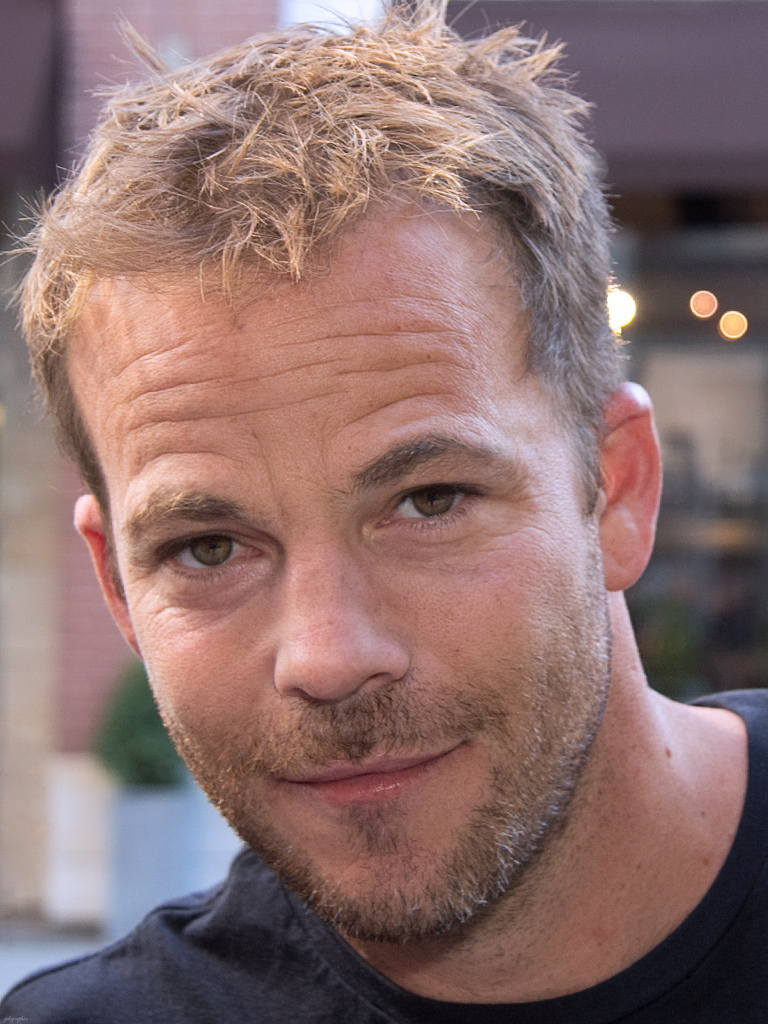
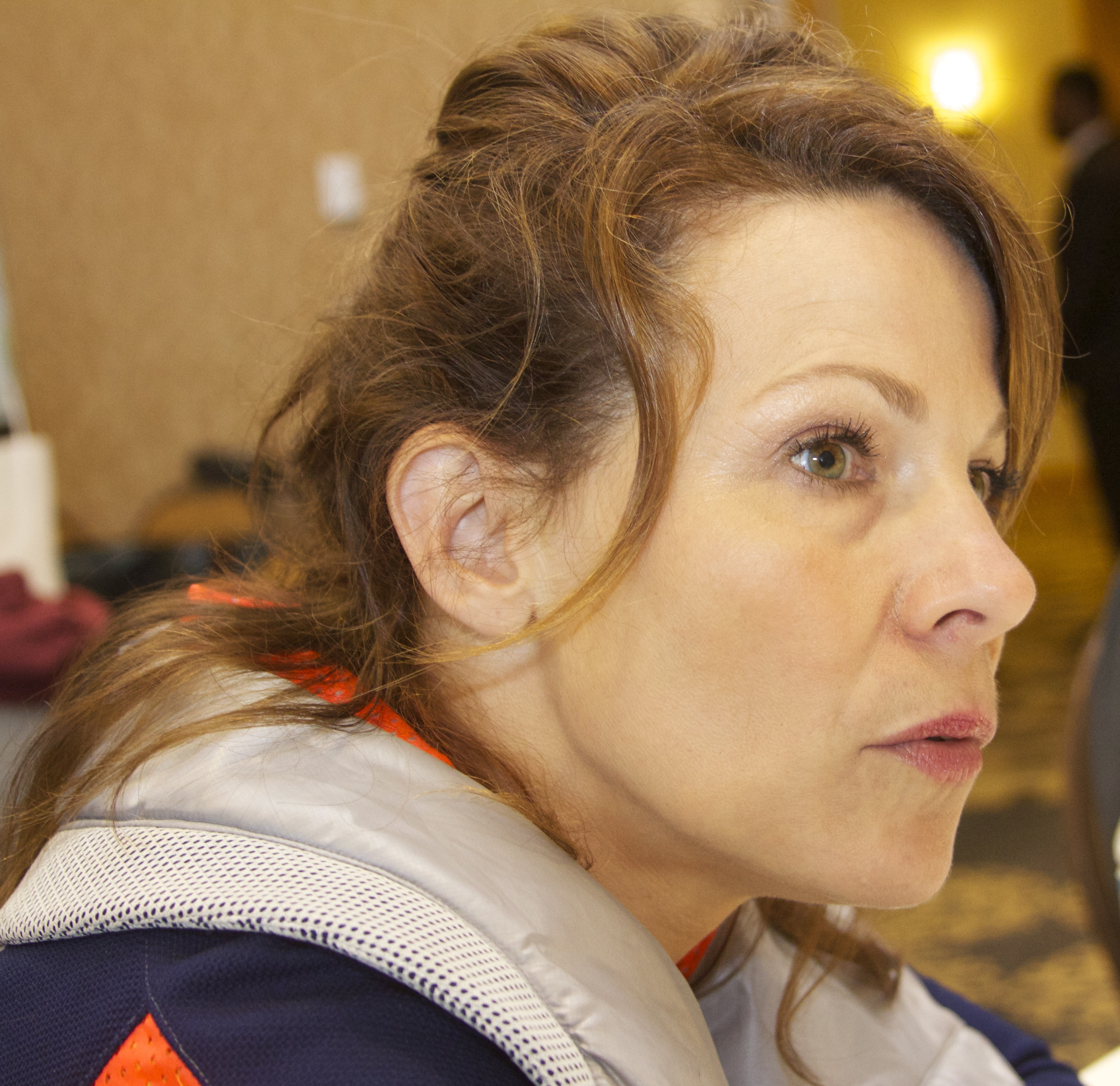
Stephen Dorff (left) and Lili Taylor were complimented by critics for their performances.

On review aggregator website Rotten Tomatoes, Leatherface received an approval rating of 27% based on 44 reviews, and an average rating of 4.05/10. Its consensus reads, "Leatherface may wear the skin of a Texas Chainsaw Massacre prequel, but it proves gutless as an origin story and finds little invention in the horror tropes it's cannibalizing." On Metacritic, which assigns a normalized rating to reviews, the film has a weighted average score of 40 out of 100, based on 12 critics, indicating "mixed or average" reviews.

Stephen Dalton of The Hollywood Reporter referred to the film as "a respectful origin story for the long-running Texas Chainsaw Massacre horror franchise" and also complimented the performances of Stephen Dorff and Lili Taylor. Benedict Seal of Variety called Leatherface a mixed bag, but also felt that, in being driven more by story than gore, it was a well-made attempt to course correct the TCM franchise; he believed that nothing can truly live up to the original film. Bloody Disgusting gave it a 3.5/5 score, saying that "Bustillo and Maury have made the best TCM film in quite some while." The site suggested that the film's evasion of slasher movie tropes may have resulted in it not receiving a wide release, but still found it to be sufficiently entertaining.

Rating the film 4/5 stars, Jennie Kermode of Eye for Film found Leatherface to be less gory than previous installments, which she said may disappoint some TCM fans, but also felt that the story-driven horror made up for it. Dread Central's Staci Wilson was put off by the graphic content and plot holes in the film, but praised the acting and cinematography, giving a final verdict of 3/5 stars. Anton Bitel of SciFiNow appraised that, despite its excessive violence, it didn't come close to meeting the quality of horror of the first Texas Chain Saw Massacre, but added "If 'Nobody messes with our family' is the ultimate message, Maury and Bustillo certainly maintain a respectful continuity to reunite the old clan." For being what he called the most entertaining film since the original, ComingSoon.Net writer Jerry Smith gave the prequel a positive review. He assessed that "Do we really need yet another horror icon origin story and if so, would the explanation be anything we haven't seen before? The answers to these questions are quite refreshing." He went on to contrast the origin story given to that of Texas Chainsaw Massacre: The Beginning as having been able to acknowledge the previous films without it feeling forced. V.O.D.zilla's Matthew Turner assigned a 6.2 rating, opining that Leatherface lacked the fear factor of the original, but was sustained by its gore, visual style, and acting.

In a negative review, Flickering Myth critiqued that "Some stories just don’t need telling, and Leatherface is one of them." He stated that while it wasn't a needless origin story or a retcon of what came before, the film felt empty and forgettable. Screen International opined that it was made more for profit than passion, but still thought it was above average in quality for a TCM film. HeyUGuys theorized that it alienated potential viewers by delivering something that fans didn't want and by being too gory for general audiences. William Bibbiani of IGN ranked it as the worst Texas Chainsaw Massacre film for being too predictable and adding nothing to the series: "It honestly looks as though the filmmakers who made Leatherface didn't watch the original films, but watched all of the films that ripped off The Texas Chain Saw Massacre instead." Film critic Rob Gonsalves reviewed that it was respectful to the previous films, but was consequently akin to a glorified fan film that couldn't deviate from what came before. Heather Wixson of Daily Dead went into Leatherface wanting to love it, but thought the final product couldn't decide what type of movie it wanted to be. She questioned why it was reluctant to be a straight TCM film and slammed the third act, though citing the cinematography, practical effects, and Lili Taylor's acting as redeeming qualities.

== Future ==
Prior to the release of Leatherface, the producers had the rights to make six further Texas Chainsaw Massacre films. In April 2015, producer Christa Campbell stated that the fate of the remaining films would largely depend on the financial reception and perceived fan reactions to the 2017 prequel. Campbell later clarified in December 2017 that Lionsgate and Millennium Films had lost the rights due to the time it took to release it.

In August 2018, Legendary Pictures was in the running to buy the rights to the franchise, with an interest in film and television. In 2019, they began developing a new film with Chris Thomas Devlin and Fede Álvarez serving as writer and producer, respectively. It is another sequel to the original film, picking up decades later without explicitly erasing other films in the series; it does not exist within the Leatherface timeline. The film was released on February 18, 2022, on Netflix.

== See also ==
- List of horror films of 2017
- List of prequels
- Leatherface (disambiguation)
