= Astral (film) =

- Film poster
- Directed by: Chris Mul
- Written by: Chris Mul; Michael Mul
- Produced by: Christos Kardana; Chris Mul
- Starring: Frank Dillane; Vanessa Grasse
- Cinematography: Charles Heales
- Edited by: Giorgio Galli
- Music by: Ed Watkins
- Production company: Craven Street
- Distributed by: Vertical Entertainment
- Release date: 23 November 2018
- Running time: 83 minutes
- Country: United Kingdom
- Language: English

Astral is a 2018 British horror film directed by Chris Mul and starring Frank Dillane and Vanessa Grasse. It is Mul's feature directorial debut.

== Plot ==
Claire Harmann is released from a psychiatric hospital. Her little boy and husband see her mysteriously drawn to enter the attic one night. The boy learns afterward that she has died.

Now a morose 21-year-old British university student, Alex Harmann learns that his mother actually committed suicide there. His estranged father, Joel, is unreceptive to his questions about her. After hearing a professor discuss out-of-body experiences, Alex decides to try to contact her spirit through astral projection. His friends and roommates laugh at his first attempts, which fail. Only Alyssa, who has a crush on Alex, take his scientific research seriously. He tests his progress with video footage of himself sleeping (giving the movie a found footage movie vibe). Eventually, he begins to see shadowy spirits. The more astral journeys he takes, the more these entities vie to enter his body to access and influence our world. As his friends also begin to see them, as the dark shadow figures begin to look more human, they realize that the ghosts are malevolent.

Alex becomes tormented by the "shadow people" and suffers from sleep paralysis. He discovers that he is not the only member of his family to have been besieged by such beings, as his mother's dark past is brought to his attention. When he meets his mother's doctor, Alex explains that he has seen a different shape among the ghosts, a human with the head of a ram. Dr. Lefler replies that the astral projections may have opened a gateway that was meant to stay shut. At last Alex and Alyssa visit a psychic medium, Michelle, who provides him a Tarot card reading. When Michelle realizes he is being besieged by Asmodai, she begins to incant an exorcism spell. The demon possesses his body, and he begins to throttle Alyssa, but the spell works and Alex is released.

Alex reconciles with his father, and they reminisce over pictures Alex had drawn as a child. The last picture startles him, and he remembers that he was drawing it on the night his mother went upstairs to hang herself. The picture is of the shadow of Asmodeus. His mother had not been psychotic; she had been haunted by the demon, who made her kill herself.

== Cast ==
- Frank Dillane as Alex Harmann
  - Louis Ahmet as Young Alex
- Vanessa Grasse as Alyssa Hodge
- Trevor White as Professor Gareth Powell
- Mark Aiken as Dr James Lefler
- Juliet Howland as Michelle Collins
- Damson Idris as Jordan Knight
- Ned Porteous as Ben Lawrence
- Jennifer Brooke as Karina Richardson
- Darwin Shaw as Joel Harmann
- Catherine Steadman as Claire Harmann

== Production ==
Director Chris Mul told an interviewer that he and his brother, co-writer Michael Mul, had cast Frank Dillane, who had just finished acting in the television show Fear The Walking Dead. Dillane was heading to Mexico to engage in post-production voice dubbing, so they had a limited time frame in which to film Astral. The Mul brothers had a small budget, so they decided to film it in two weeks to use fewer funds. "Although everyone [in the crew] received payment for the film, for working on it, at this budget you can't meet the larger scale minimum rates, so we almost took it as like a two week holiday." The final production budget was £65,000.

== Casting ==
Dillane was the Mul brothers' first choice to star and was the first actor they contacted. Their casting director already knew Dillane's agent. Dillane suffered from sleep paralysis himself, so he was eager to take the part. Through audition casting sessions, Damson Idris (Alex's friend Jordan) and Vanessa Grasse (Alyssa) were chosen. Chris Mul told an interviewer that "the older, more experienced actors [...] came on board two, three, four days before we were about to shoot. ... Once we had Frank, we had more interest from very talented actors, and that extended to the more experienced actors."

== Filming ==
The film had only two locations. The home where Alex and his roommates live was in Wimbledon, London. The Royal Holloway University in Surrey was used for Alex's college, and filming there took place only in the University courtyard. Director Chris Mul said that the university "looked beautiful, but we knew the time was fast approaching for the summer to end. We didn't want to be there whilst there were students, so we had a week." The entire shoot took only twelve days, August 17–29, in 2015.

Mul chose to use practical effects rather than CGI effects. Crew members dressed up and were "almost just completely blacked out" to give Dillane something to interact with, rather than just green screen.

== Release ==
The film was released in theaters and VOD on 23 November 2018.

== Reception ==
Jake Dee of JoBlo.com gave the film a 6 out of 10. Dee describes the premise as captivating but ultimately derivative, and somewhat deceptive, since the movie turns out to focus less on astral projection (which is never visually portrayed) and instead more on sleep paralysis. Dee concludes that the Mul brothers chose a compelling topic, produced a good screenplay, and chose the right actors. "If they repeat the feat with a larger amount of time and money, great things are sure to abound for these guys."

Norman Gidney of Film Threat awarded the film five stars out of ten. Dennis Harvey of Variety gave the film a negative review and wrote, "You’ll wish you could project yourself into a different entertainment dimension while slogging through Astral."
