= The Payoff =

The Payoff may refer to:

- The Pay-Off (1930 film)
- The Pay-Off (1926 film)
- The Payoff (1935 film), an American crime/drama/romance film
- The Payoff (1942 film), an American crime mystery film
- The Payoff (1978 film), an Italian comedy-crime movie also known as The Payoff
- "The Payoff" (song), a 2010 single by Canadian rock band Faber Drive
- "The Pay Off" (Kenny Ball song), a 1962 song by Kenny Ball

== See also ==
- Payoff (disambiguation)
