= Moon Ye-won =

South Korean actress (born 1991)

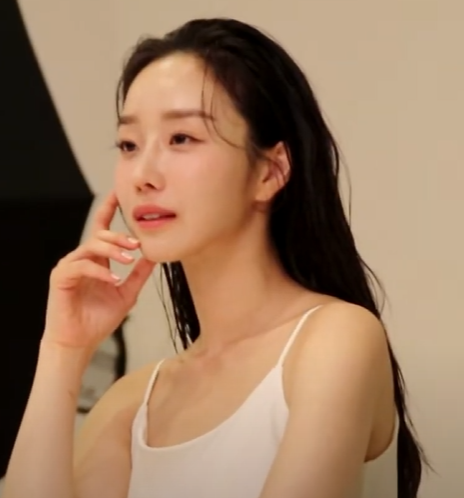
- Moon in 2020
- Born: Moon Ye-won; 10 September 1991 (age 35); South Korea
- Education: Dongduk Women's University – Department of Broadcasting and Entertainment
- Occupation: Actress
- Years active: 2018–present
- Agent: Will Entertainment

Korean name
- Hangul: 문예원
- RR: Mun Yewon
- MR: Mun Yewŏn

Moon Ye-won (Korean: 문예원; born 10 September 1991) is a South Korean actress. She is known for her roles in dramas such as Children of Nobody, Legal High and she is also known for her role in movies such as Gonjiam: Haunted Asylum.

== Filmography ==
=== Film ===
Year	Title	Role	Ref.
2018	Gonjiam: Haunted Asylum	Charlotte	
2018	Illang: The Wolf Brigade	Splendid costume lady	
2025	Romance	Hye-kyung	

=== Television series ===
Year	Title	Role	Ref.
2018	Children of Nobody	Choi Mi-sun	
2019	Legal High	Nam Sul-hee	
2020	Hyena	Baek Woon-mi	
2021	Happiness	Woo Sang-hee	
2021	One Ordinary Day	Kang Da-kyung	
2022–2023	Three Bold Siblings	Lee Sang-min	
2022	Love Is for Suckers	Ahn So-yeon	
2022	The Fabulous	Seo-jin	
2023	Moon in the Day	Choi Na-yeon	
2024	Miss Night and Day	Tak Cheon-hee	

== Awards and nominations ==
Year	Award	Category	Work	Result	Ref.
2025	The 45th Golden Cinematography Awards	Best New Actress	Romance	Won	
