= I'm After You =

2015 South Korean television film

- Movie poster
- Written by: Kim Hyun-jung
- Directed by: Lee Jung-heum
- Starring: Ryu Deok-hwan; Kwon Yul; Jang Young-nam
- Country of origin: South Korea
- Original language: Korean

Original release
- Network: SBS TV
- Release: December 26, 2015

I'm After You (Korean: 너를 노린다; RR: neoreul norinda; also known as I've Got My Eye on You and I'm Aiming for You) is a 2015 South Korean made-for-television drama film starring Ryu Deok-hwan, Kwon Yul, and Jang Young-nam. The film is the debut of director Lee Jung-heum, who previously worked as an assistant director for Giant and The Chaser, with writer Kim Hyun-jung collaborating. I'm After You was noted as the first South Korean drama to address the issues surrounding student loans.

== Synopsis ==
Park Hee-tae (Ryu) achieved national fame as the winner of a quiz show for smart children. He is now a transfer student at prestigious Seoul National University, where he feels like an outsider. Intent on rising in status, Hee-tae teams up with Yum Ki-ho (Kwon), a cold-hearted law student from a wealthy family, and establishes a student loan method called "Angel Fund." The fund is tied to a prestigious club, which only certain privileged students can join. This leads to abusive dynamics and power-mongering between the students and eventually results in a murder. Realizing his own complicity in a fellow student's death, Hee-tae goes to the police and admits what he knows about the club and its dynamics. He presents CCTV footage of Yum's speeches as evidence that the club intentionally preyed on the powerless in order to strengthen a small elite.

== Cast ==
- Ryu Deok-hwan ..... Park Hee-tae
- Kwon Yul ..... Yum Ki-ho
- Jang Young-nam ..... Nam Kyung-hee
- Seo Jun-young ..... Yoo Min-woo
- Choi Tae-hwan ..... Lee Gun
- Oh Dae-hwan ..... Detective Lim Chul-ho
- Kim Jin-woo ..... Min Hyung-woo
- Lee Jae-kyoon ..... Jo Choong-ho
- Kim Chang-hwan ..... Kim Hyung-sik
- Han Jae-suk ..... Park Jung-woo
- Oh Ah-yeon ..... Jin Yoon-seo
- Choi Gwi-hwa ..... Manager Jeon
- Im Ji-kyu ..... Secretary Min
- Jo Hee-bong ..... Sang-jin

== Reception ==
The program aired on December 26, 2015, on SBS. It garnered positive reviews for its depiction of issues such as social hierarchy, university ranking, student debt, and society's emphasis on scholastic success.
