= Santa Jaws =

2018 American film

- Directed by: Misty Talley
- Written by: Jake Kiernan
- Starring: Reid Miller; Miles Doleac
- Release date: August 15, 2018 (SyFy)
- Running time: 88 minutes
- Country: United States
- Language: English

Santa Jaws is a 2018 American Christmas horror comedy film written by Jake Kiernan, directed by Misty Talley and starring Reid Miller and Miles Doleac.

== Premise ==
Trying not to spend time with his family during Christmas, Cody makes a wish by drawing a shark wearing a Santa Claus hat, until the animal manifests itself and starts killing the local population.

== Cast ==
- Reid Miller as Cody
- Courtney Lauren Cummings as Jena
- Carrie Lazar as Caroline
- Jim Klock as Peter
- Hawn Tran as Steve
- Haviland Stillwell as Georgia
- Miles Doleac as Mike
- Arthur Marroquin as Josh
- Scott Allen Perry as Clark
- Ritchie Montgomery as Papa Joe

== Production ==
The film was shot in Louisiana.

== Release ==
The film premiered on Syfy on August 15, 2018. The film was also released in the Surfside Playhouse in Surfside, Florida on December 10, 2021.

== Reception ==
Chris Coffell of Bloody Disgusting awarded the film three "skulls" out of five, saying: "I’m not really a big fan of the shark mashup movies that SyFy and The Asylum regularly pump out. A lot of them have a thin premise built off one joke that quickly dies out and they typically seem to be hastily made in order to just get another one out. A lot of these absurd movies could actually be fun if they were made with real effort in an attempt to be good. Most fail to do that. Fortunately, Santa Jaws ain’t most."

== See also ==
- Christmas horror
- List of Christmas films
- List of horror films of 2018
- List of holiday horror films
