= Roboshark (film) =

- Film poster
- Written by: Jeffery Scott Lando; Phillip Roth
- Directed by: Jeffery Scott Lando
- Starring: Alexis Peterman; Matt Rippy; Nigel Barber; Vanessa Grasse; Isaac Haig; Laura Dale; Steve Sires
- Music by: Claude Foisy
- Countries of origin: Bulgaria, Canada
- Original language: English

Production
- Producers: Jeffrey Beach; Jeffery Scott Lando; Phillip Roth
- Cinematography: Alexander Krumov
- Editor: Julian Minkov
- Running time: 88 minutes
- Production company: Bulgarian Unified Film Organization

Original release
- Network: Syfy
- Release: 18 July 2015

Roboshark (also released as Robo Shark vs. Navy Seals) is a 2015 Bulgarian-Canadian television film, directed and co-written by Jeffery Scott Lando. Co-written and co-produced by Phillip Roth. Roboshark is a "gonzo shark film", a "tongue-in-cheek creature feature" which satirically blends action, comedy, and science fiction. The film premiered at the start of Syfy Channel's second annual Sharknado week on 18 July 2015.

== Plot ==
An alien ship approaches the Earth and launches a probe which enters the atmosphere and then splashes into the Pacific, where it is devoured by a great white shark. The shark convulses and in a few moments is transformed by the probe into a red-lined robotic simulacrum of the ocean predator. An American nuclear submarine in the area detects the robotic shark's movements and, considering it an unknown hostile entity, the captain decides to destroy it. Instead, the submarine's hull is breached by the shark's newly enhanced teeth and all hands are lost.

In Seattle, a viral video of uncertain authenticity begins to circulate of a seaplane being attacked in the harbour. Local reporter Trish Larson is tired of her role as "the wacky weather girl" and complains about fake news. She defies station orders and takes her cameraman Louie to cover area military activity in the Discovery Park area, and they witness the so-called Roboshark as it invades a coffee shop and devours a customer who unwittingly live streams his own demise. Trish's story is hijacked by her colleague Veronica. Trish's husband Rick, a supervisor at the Seattle public works department, is tracking the alien's progress through the sewers and informs her of its movements even as Roboshark begins trending in earnest. The Navy commandeers his office, determined to destroy Roboshark by any means necessary, even at the cost of bystanders' lives.

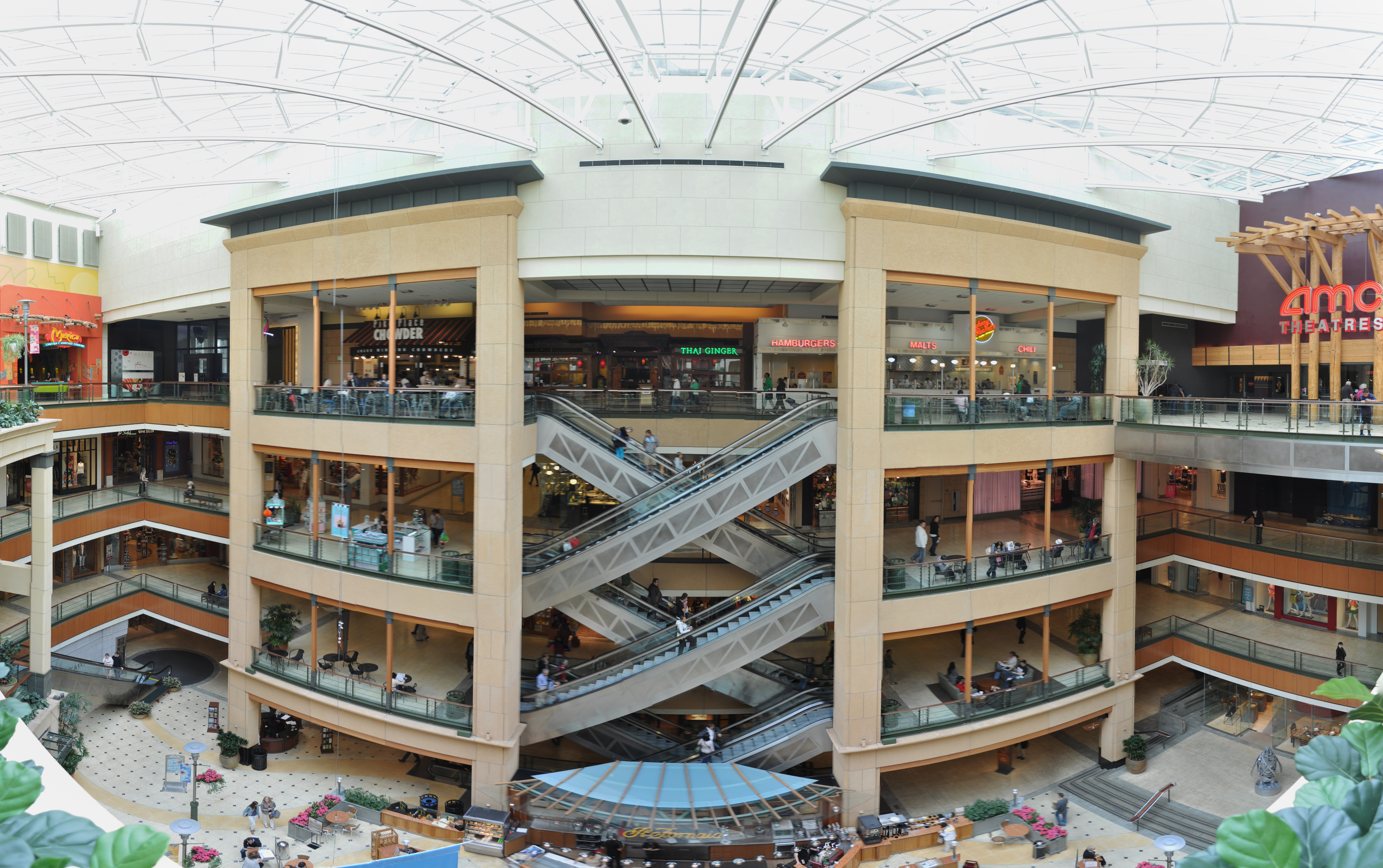
Pacific Place (interior)

Navy SEALs track and engage Roboshark in the Pacific Place mall. The men's guns are minimally effective against its metal frame, slowing it down but ultimately failing to stop it and it kills them. Trish and Melody record the latter stages of the encounter and post it on YouTube, getting high numbers of views, but are disappointed to find that many people do not take the video seriously. Trish's teenage daughter Melody discovers that Roboshark is following her on Twitter, and realizes that it is not acting out of malignant intent but reacting defensively. In a close encounter with Melody, the alien's robotic form's colours switch from its usual aggressive red to a more "friendly" green.

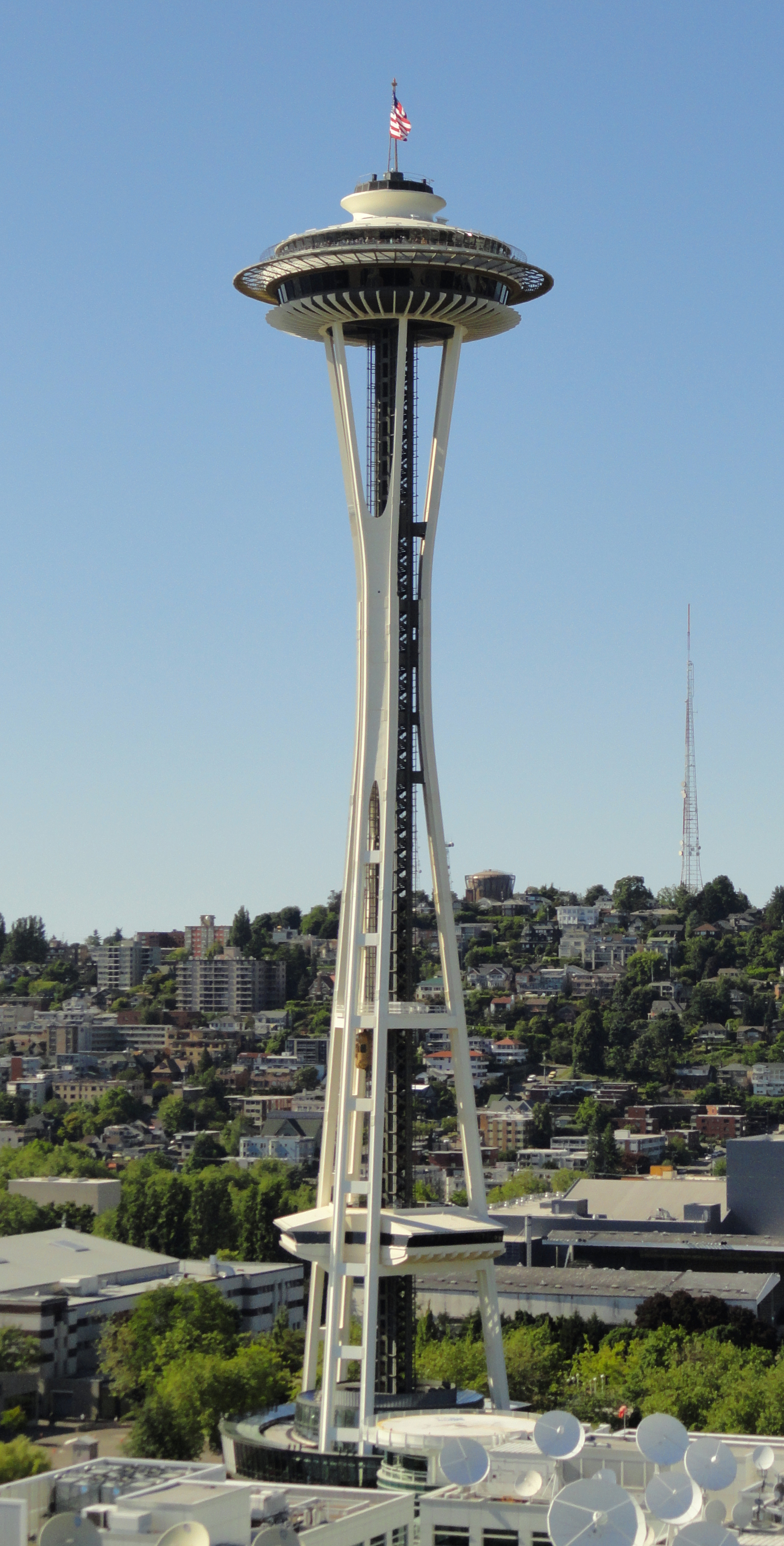
The Space Needle

Trish, Melody, and Louie try to convince Admiral Black that Roboshark intended no harm, to no avail. A techpreneur "more powerful" than the President arrives - Bill Gates. (Note: The character is portrayed to look and sound like Bill Gates.) He tries to help the Navy by communicating with Roboshark with a view to reverse engineering it, using a small quadcopter, but the plan fails as Roboshark traces the signal back to its source and Gates - after crying out "It's full of stars!" - is dragged around a park to his death. Veronica gets too close to the action in her zeal to win a Peabody Award and is likewise killed. A final confrontation ensues at the Space Needle, which Roboshark intends to use as a means to "phone home". The battle leads to the Needle collapsing, Admiral Black along with it, and the disappearance of the alien. Rick is reunited with Trish and Melody.

Some time later, a woman walks in the park amid the Space Needle debris with a small dog whose eyes begin to glow red. This implies that Roboshark is alive and has transferred its consciousness into the dog.

== Cast ==
Main

- Alexis Peterman as Trish Lanson
- Matt Rippy as Rick Lanson
- Nigel Barber as Admiral Nathan Black
- Vanessa Grasse as Melody Lanson
- Isaac Haig as Louie
- Laura Dale as Veronica Viola
- Steve Sires as Bill Glates

Supporting

- Vladimir Mihaylov as Erik
- Derek Morse as Chief Xavier
- Raymond Steers as Commander Summer
- Lorenzo Estebanez as Rodriguez
- Kitodar Todorov as Malone
- Hristo Balabanov as Max
- Anton Poriazov as Bike Rider Go Pro Guy
- Atanas Srebrev as Fire Chief Wilson
- Anton Trendafilov as Phil
- Daniel Ganev as Barista

== Genre and themes ==
Richard Scheib remarks that the "gonzo shark film" has become its own "mini-genre" in the 2010s: "the shark film began a move towards the increasingly tongue-in-cheek, something that reached its zenith with the deliberate absurdity of the instant bad movie hit Sharknado (2013)." Scheib lists some twenty titles of shark films in a similar vein, and explains its attractiveness to a filmmaker: "no matter how cheesy and ridiculous the film is, it actually adds to the appeal."

Indeed, filmmakers seem to be in a competition with each other as to how absurdly over-the-top they are capable of making each film and/or the mash-up the title brings together. From the outset, Roboshark looks set to try and top the cheesiness value. The film is made with the cut-price locations and effects common to BUFO's other disaster and monster movies... In particular, the CGI animation of the Roboshark is painfully obvious and cheap.

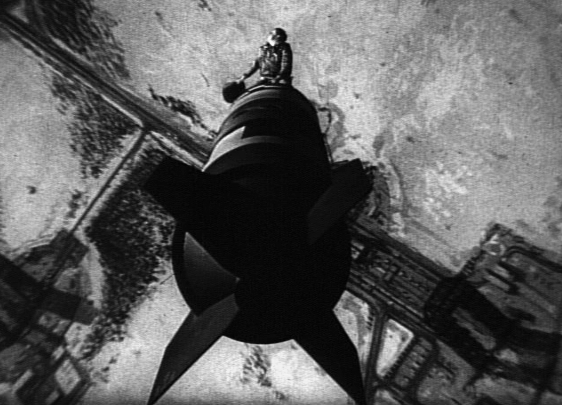
Slim Pickens riding the Bomb in Dr. Strangelove, a possible reference in Roboshark.

A recurring theme and object of "sly" satire running through Roboshark is the world of social media and online reactions to current events, something which "sets it apart from its many, many brethren." Scheib speculates that this may have been an attempt to capitalize on the fact that "the Sharknado phenomenon was spawned by Twitter." In the same vein, Roboshark also takes "pot shots" at Microsoft and Starbucks, closely associated with Seattle.

Finally, there are also many inside jokes and references to science fiction films, Close Encounters of the Third Kind and THX 1138 to name two. Lisa Bowman suggests that the film's penultimate scene of the Admiral's kamikaze-style use of the Space Needle references Slim Pickens riding the nuclear bomb in Dr. Strangelove.

== Production ==
=== Background ===
The Bulgarian Unified Film Organization (UFO International Productions LLC during production), is Phillip Roth's production company, which generally makes modern low-budget genre films shot in Bulgaria, while director Jeffery Lando has made many other low-budget horror and science-fiction films. The same year, Lando released Suspension, which won Best Director at Montreal HorrorFest. Few of UFO's horror projects have been shark films, but some viewers saw Roboshark as a follow-up to the company's Robocroc (2013), also made for Syfy Channel.

=== Filming ===
Roboshark was shot primarily in Sofia, Bulgaria, as well as in Seattle.

=== Marketing and related works ===
A trailer for the film was posted online in early July 2015. The shark's fictional Twitter account is mirrored by a real account by the filmmakers, following those among the audience who posted tweets the night of the first television broadcast and retweeting some of their messages.

== Release and reception ==
Roboshark was broadcast for the first time on 18 July 2015, on SyFy, inaugurating the channel's second annual Sharknado week. It was one of several original films to be broadcast the same week.

=== Critical response ===
Critics who praised Roboshark focused on its knowingly B Movie status and its playful use of social media. SciFi & Scary gave the film 5/5: "Overall, Roboshark was a delight to watch and to interact with, because, yes, folks, Roboshark will follow you on Twitter." Lisa Bowman calls it "the type of film that must be watched with a large group of people looking to have a good (and silly) time. It's the type of film that literally begged to be live tweeted and, needless to say, that's exactly what a lot of us did." Richard Scheib assigned the film 3 stars: "The film keeps serving up a range of entertainingly preposterous scenes... By far the most entertaining parts of the film are where the Roboshark goes on the internet... By the end, the film even gets itself together and delivers some reasonably accomplished effects as the military decide to crash the Space Needle down to kill Roboshark."

Steve Hutchison agrees the film is entertaining, providing a "chuckle every two minutes"; an "extremely stupid story, but without ever testing our attention span." The film is "a guilty pleasure" but: "Sadly, this picture runs out of things to say after the first half. Ultimately, the U.S. Navy brings the movie down."

The Radio Times gave Roboshark 2 stars. British reviewer Andy Webb gave Roboshark 1 star, criticizing the effects, the dialogue, and humour.

=== Home media and streaming ===
Roboshark was released on DVD and digital formats (Sony Pictures Entertainment) on 22 March 2016. It is available on Amazon Prime.
