= Kym Jackson =

Australian actress and author (born 1983)

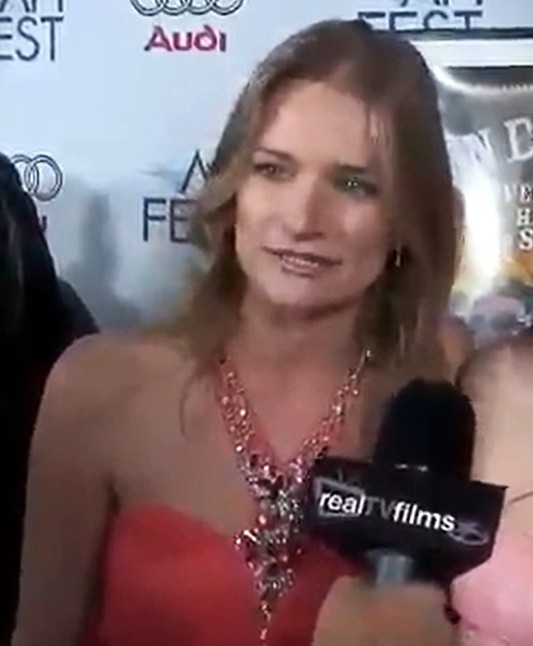
- Jackson in 2008
- Born: 1 July 1983 (age 43); Bath, England
- Occupations: Actress; screenwriter; author
- Years active: 2002–present

Kym Jackson (born 1 July 1983) is a British actress and author. She is known for her roles in feature films We Bury The Dead (2024), The Devil's Dolls (2016), Iron Sky, Red Line and Snitch, and CBS hit TV shows Criminal Minds and NCIS: Los Angeles. She is a member of American Mensa.

== Life and career ==
Born in Bath, England, Jackson's family relocated to Australia just after her third birthday. She began acting in stage productions with her community and school theatre groups at the age of five and performed in around twenty plays over the following ten years. She attended John Paul College in Daisy Hill, Queensland.

At age seventeen, Jackson moved from Logan City, Queensland to Surfers Paradise, to pursue a film career, working as a tour guide at Warner Brothers Studios while training for film and TV, and auditioning for roles.

Her first role came in the year 2002, in the feature film Scooby-Doo. This was followed closely by a small part in the US telemovie Border Patrol.

In 2002, she relocated to Sydney, and she moved to Hollywood in June 2004.

She received her USA Greencard in February 2006 and her US television debut occurred in April 2008 in the CBS crime drama Criminal Minds. Jackson has since played supporting and leading roles in over thirty film and TV projects, including Bordering on Bad Behavior with Tom Sizemore, Retribution with Bryan Krause and Frances Fisher, and Snitch with Dwayne Johnson and Susan Sarandon.

== Works ==
- Jackson, Kym (2012). The Hollywood Survival Guide – For Aussie Actors. Los Angeles, California: Perfict Books. 352pp. ISBN 978-0987231604.
- Jackson, Kym (2014). The Hollywood Survival Guide for Actors: Your Handbook to Becoming a Working Actor in LA. Los Angeles, California: Perfict Books. 352pp. ISBN 978-0987231628.
