= Gonjiam: Haunted Asylum =

- Theatrical release poster
- Hangul: 곤지암
- Hanja: 昆池岩
- RR: Gonjiam
- MR: Konjiam
- Directed by: Jung Bum-shik
- Written by: Jung Bum-shik; Park Sang-min
- Produced by: Kim Won-kuk
- Starring: Wi Ha-joon; Park Ji-hyun; Oh Ah-yeon; Moon Ye-won; Park Sung-hoon; Yoo Je-yoon; Lee Seung-wook; Park Ji-a
- Cinematography: Yoon Byung-ho
- Production company: Hive Mediacorp
- Distributed by: Showbox
- Release date: March 28, 2018
- Running time: 91 minutes
- Country: South Korea
- Language: Korean
- Budget: $2.2 million
- Box office: $21 million

Gonjiam: Haunted Asylum (Korean: 곤지암) is a 2018 South Korean found footage supernatural horror film directed by Jung Bum-shik, who co-wrote it with Park Sang-min. Based on the real psychiatric hospital of the same name, it stars Wi Ha-joon, Park Ji-hyun, Oh Ah-yeon, Moon Ye-won, Park Sung-hoon, Yoo Je-yoon, and Lee Seung-wook as the members of a horror web series crew who travel to an abandoned asylum for a live broadcast to garner views and publicity.

The film was released on 28 March 2018. A critical and commercial success, it grossed $21 million on a budget of $2.2 million and became the third most-watched horror film in South Korea after A Tale of Two Sisters (2003) and Phone (2002). It was later screened at the 20th Udine Far East Film Festival. The film is regarded as one of the best of its genre, with some critics claiming that it "mastered" found footage horror. The film was remade in Indonesia as 402 Haunted Korean Hospital (2026).

== Plot ==
Two boys livestream themselves exploring the abandoned Gonjiam Psychiatric Hospital, where rumor states that the hospital's ping pong-loving director murdered all the patients before disappearing. The two head to Room 402, the intensive care unit, which no one has ever managed to open. After the sound of a ping-pong ball is heard, their livestream abruptly ends, with a fleeting glimpse of a ghostly face.

News of their disappearance prompts Ha-joon, owner of the YouTube channel "Horror Times", to investigate the hospital. He enlists six people—three women (Ah-yeon, Charlotte, and Ji-hyun) and three men (Sung-hoon, Seung-wook, and Je-yoon)—for the livestreamed exploration. While the six enter the building, Ha-joon remains at a base camp nearby to oversee the broadcast.

To spice up the livestream as with previous "Horror Times" videos, Ha-joon, Sung-hoon, and Seung-wook have prepared fake scares for the explorers and viewers to react to. Once inside, the group make a few "discoveries" (staged in advance) to up the tension. Outside, the camp's propane burners turn on by themselves. Ha-joon's equipment fails, temporarily cutting him off from the group.

Je-yoon and Ah-yeon attempt to open Room 402 while the others explore the common room, where they find closets with holes in them. When Ji-hyun places her arm inside one, it is pulled and scratched. Frightened, Ji-hyun and Charlotte bail out and leave the asylum.

Meanwhile, Ha-joon watches footage of all six participants together and becomes unsettled, unsure who filmed it. Nevertheless, he convinces Seung-wook and Sung-hoon to continue the scripted livestream, promising them higher pay. In the supply room, they encounter objects moving by themselves, and Seung-wook is knocked unconscious. Sung-hoon is dragged out of the room and also struck unconscious.

Outside the hospital, Ji-hyun and Charlotte repeatedly see a marked tree, and realize they are walking in circles. Ji-hyun falls into a trance and her eyes turn black. Terrified, Charlotte flees toward the camp but finds herself back inside Room 402. After several scares, a naked man appears and drags her into the darkness.

Sung-hoon wakes and runs to Je-yoon and Ah-yeon, who are still trying to open Room 402. He admits to them and on camera that some earlier events were staged, but now real paranormal forces are happening and they must rescue Seung-wook. A ping-pong ball is suddenly thrown at them, followed by Charlotte's screams from inside Room 402. The group's infrared cameras detect a presence as the door finally opens.

Sung-hoon, Je-yoon and Ah-yeon find themselves trapped in a dark, water-filled room with no exit. Ghostly apparitions surround and possess them one by one. Ha-joon, seeing his view count nearing one million, leaves for the asylum. Using his drone camera, he spots someone struggling near a window inside one of the rooms on the top floor. He enters the asylum to investigate, and, looking through a window, sees himself watching the previous footage of the struggling man. Ha-joon becomes paralyzed with fear as the floating corpse of the director creeps up behind him. As he hesitantly turns his camera and viewfinder to film himself, the ghost of the director screams and strangles Ha-joon to death. Later, Seung-wook awakens strapped to a wheelchair and is dragged into Room 402 as multiple ghostly patients observe him from inside their rooms.

The livestream is revealed to have ended abruptly after Sung-hoon admitted it was scripted. Unaware of the paranormal events inside the asylum, viewers mock the failed stream, which had only peaked to 503 viewers, far fewer than the near-million Ha-joon saw on his screen.

== Cast ==
- Wi Ha-joon as Ha-joon
- Park Ji-hyun as Ji-hyun
- Oh Ah-yeon as Ah-yeon
- Moon Ye-won as Charlotte
- Park Sung-hoon as Sung-hoon
- Yoo Je-yoon as Je-yoon
- Lee Seung-wook as Seung-wook
- Park Ji-a as Hospital Director / Director's Ghost

== Production ==
The film takes place in the former Gonjiam Psychiatric Hospital in Gwangju, purportedly one of South Korea's most haunted locations. In 2012, CNN Travel selected it as one of the "seven freakiest places on the planet". Most of the scenes in the film were shot at the National Maritime High School in Busan, with the crew adhering closely to the floor plan of the actual hospital to recreate the same exterior and hallways.

Before the release of the film, the owner of Gonjiam Psychiatric Hospital filed a lawsuit in an attempt to prevent the film being shown in cinemas, claiming that the publicity from the film would hinder his ability to sell the building if he chose to do so in the future. In March 2018, a Seoul court ruled in favor of the film being shown, and the building was demolished two months later.

== Release ==
The film released in South Korea on 28 March 2018. In the United States, the film was released by Well Go USA on 18 April 2018, and in the Philippines, the film was released by Multivision Pictures in partnership with Viva International Pictures on 2 May 2018.

In April 2018, just days after the film was released, actor Lee Seung-wook who made his debut with the film announced his departure from the entertainment industry. The actor, who was reportedly absent from promotional activities for the film, cited personal reasons for the decision.

== Reception ==
On the review aggregator website Rotten Tomatoes, 92% of critics' reviews are positive, with an average rating of 7.6/10.

Gonjiam: Haunted Asylum came in first at the domestic box office on March 28, 2018, alongside the openings of Hollywood film Ready Player One and local film Seven Years of Night, collecting US$1.2 million from 198,369 admissions. Remaining at the top spot for the next four days, the film earned US$10.2 million from 1.37 million admissions in its opening weekend and accounted for 40% of the total weekend box office receipts, the biggest March opening ever achieved by a Korean film.

After three weekends, Gonjiam: Haunted Asylum has attracted near to 2.6 million viewers and accumulated US$21 million in box office takings, the second biggest gross for a Korean horror film, behind 2003's A Tale of Two Sisters.

Aedan Juvet of Bleeding Cool claimed the film "mastered" found footage horror, naming it amongst some of the best of its genre.

== Awards and nominations ==
Awards	Category	Recipient	Result	Ref.
55th Grand Bell Awards	Best New Actor	Wi Ha-joon	Nominated	
55th Grand Bell Awards	Best Editing	Kim Hyung-joo, Yang Dong-yeop	Won	
55th Grand Bell Awards	Best Planning	Gonjiam: Haunted Asylum	Nominated	
39th Blue Dragon Film Awards	Best New Actor	Wi Ha-joon	Nominated	
39th Blue Dragon Film Awards	Best New Actress	Park Ji-hyun	Nominated	
39th Blue Dragon Film Awards	Best Editing	Kim Hyung-joo, Yang Dong-yeop	Won	
39th Blue Dragon Film Awards	Technical Award (Sound)	Park Yong-gi, Park Joo-gang	Nominated	
5th Korean Film Producers Association Awards	Best Sound	Park Yong-gi, Park Joo-gang	Won	

== See also ==
- Grave Encounters, a 2011 Canadian film with a similar setup
- Guimoon: The Lightless Door, a 2021 horror film with a similar setup
- Strange Frequencies: Taiwan Killer Hospital, the 2024 Filipino adaptation of this film.
