= Misty Talley =

American film director and editor

- Education: University of Louisiana at Lafayette
- Occupations: Film director; editor

Misty Talley is an American film director and film editor. She also teaches at the University of Louisiana at Lafayette. Talley is the first woman to direct an original film for Syfy.

== Education ==
Talley graduated from the University of Louisiana at Lafayette with a degree in fine arts from the Visual Arts Media Program. She originally intended to become a video installation artist and teaches editing at her alma mater.

== Career ==
Talley became the first woman to direct a Syfy original film when she directed the 2015 television film Zombie Shark. She chose to direct shark films because she loves monster movies and thinks that shark films are a genre "for filmmakers to cut their teeth on". Talley stated that she loves the challenge of shooting shark-based films. She said that her shark films are more of an action adventure with camp and focuses more on the characters than similar films. Her other productions include editing productions for Lifetime and local filmmakers. The majority of the feature length films she works on are edited in Lafayette with about five projects being worked on at once.

Her short film Ten To Sing was selected for the Cannes Film Festival short films corner as part of the Marché du Film. The short film is almost 13 minutes long and is about an elderly woman who finally decides to leave her home, only to discover that she is the last person on Earth. Talley stated, "I've made two short films over the span of three years. I'm really excited to learn about how I can make more content at a faster pace with better quality and longer run times, too."

She owns the production company Fable House which is based in Louisiana and focuses on New Orleans, Baton Rouge and Lafayette.

== Filmography ==
Directed films
Year	Title
2011	Soup's On
2014	Ten To Sing
2015	Zombie Shark
2016	Ozark Sharks
2017	Mississippi River Sharks
2018	Santa Jaws
