= Open 24 Hours (film) =

- Poster
- Directed by: Padraig Reynolds
- Written by: Padraig Reynolds
- Produced by: Shibani Kapur; R.P. Khemanand
- Starring: Vanessa Grasse; Brendan Fletcher; Emily Tennant
- Cinematography: David Matthews
- Edited by: Ed Marx
- Music by: Holly Amber Church
- Production companies: Seahorse Filmhouse; Zee Studios International
- Distributed by: 4Digital Media (USA); Signature Entertainment (UK)
- Release date: September 2018
- Running time: 100 minutes
- Countries: Canada; Serbia
- Language: English

Open 24 Hours is a 2018 slasher film written and directed by Padraig Reynolds.

== Plot ==
Mary was incarcerated for setting her boyfriend, James Lincoln Fields, on fire. After her release, she works the 10 pm to 6 am night shift at a 24-hour gas station called the Deer Gas Market.

James, who is a serial killer nicknamed the "Rain Ripper," torments Mary by calling from prison when it rains and playing "Raindrops" by Dee Clark. This was his favorite song to play while murdering someone while forcing her to watch. She has hallucinations of James, which she controls with medication.

On her first shift, Bobby instructs Mary on her duties, and her childhood friend Debbie visits her. After leaving, Debbie is attacked by a hooded assailant and dragged away. A sleazy trucker hits on Mary and deliberately leaves his credit card behind.

Mary begins to receive mysterious phone calls from a woman asking her when they close. Informed by a customer that the outside toilet is out of order, Mary checks it and finds Debbie's driver's license in the bowl. Suddenly, the toilet fills with blood and arms break through the wall to grab her, but it is just another hallucination. She calls her parole officer, Tom, but is unable to get through.

Bobby returns to check on her and she briefly tells him of her history with James. Bobby then leaves, but his truck breaks down and the hooded assailant attacks him.

James arrives and claims to be real, telling her people will die and she will watch it, but Mary brushes him off as another hallucination. Tending to a woman arriving to buy gas, Mary recognizes her voice as the voice on the phone. The woman reveals herself to be the mother of James's last victim and attacks Mary with a knife, believing she is James's accomplice. Mary flees to the back room and finds Bobby and Debbie tied up. As Mary is cornered, Tom arrives and shoots the woman. He informs her that James has escaped from prison. James then appears behind Tom and knocks him out.

Tied to a chair, Mary is forced to watch James crushing Tom's skull with a sledgehammer and suffocating Debbie with a plastic bag. He prepares to set Bobby on fire. The sleazy trucker from earlier returns and he calls the police when he notices signs of a disturbance. James leaves the room to investigate.

Mary frees herself and unties Bobby, who tells her of the shotgun in the owner's locker. She retrieves the shotgun and waits to ambush James. However, she shoots the trucker by mistake. Bobby and Mary flee, but James cuts the power and kills Bobby.

Mary escapes outside where a lone police officer has arrived. She rushes into his car, but James kills the officer with the shotgun. Mary stumbles upon an old wrecking yard. James stalks her, but she hits him with a shovel and flees.

Returning to the gas station, she locks herself in the office and notices a deer's head on the wall. James breaks the door down and she impales him with the antlers. She slumps down against the desk and James crawls in and proclaims his love to her before he dies. Mary passes out until sunrise; when she wakes, James is gone and there is no trace of his blood. She then leaves the gas station.

Mary is next seen at a new job in a hairdresser's. As she is sweeping up, she hears a noise outside. As she looks up, she sees James' reflection in the mirror, staring at her and the screen cuts to black.

== Cast ==
- Vanessa Grasse as Mary, the ex-girlfriend of the "Rain Reaper" who was known as "The Watcher" because she witnessed James kill his victims.
- Brendan Fletcher as Bobby, an employee of Deer Gas Market who supervises Mary.
- Emily Tennant as Debbie, a friend of Mary's who helps take care of her after her release.
- Cole Vigue as James Lincoln Fields, a serial killer known as the "Rain Reaper" and ex-boyfriend of Mary.
- Daniel O'Meara as Tom Doogan, Mary's parole officer.
- Tomi May as Trucker, a customer of Deer Gas Market who has a crush on Mary.
- Selina Giles as Karen Rogers, the mother of one of the victims of the "Rain Reaper".
- Glendon Hobgood as Ed, the owner of the Deer Gas Market.

== Production ==
An international co-production film between Canada and Serbia. The film was screened at the 2018 Fantastic Fest.

== Reception ==
The film received mixed reviews from critics and currently sits at 45% on RottenTomatoes.
