= Leatherhead (disambiguation) =

Leatherhead is a town in Surrey, England.

Leatherhead may also refer to:

- Leatherhead F.C., a football club in Surrey, England
- Leatherhead (helmet), headgear formerly worn by firefighters and policemen in New York City
- Leatherhead (Teenage Mutant Ninja Turtle), a large mutant alligator character in Teenage Mutant Ninja Turtles
- Leatherheads, a film about American football with George Clooney
- Friarbird, species of honeyeaters in the genus Philemon
- Leatherhead railway station, railway station in Surrey, England

== See also ==
- Leatherface
