= Vanessa Grasse =

English actress

- Born: 27 June 1992 (age 34); Camden, London, England
- Education: University of Leeds
- Years active: 2015–present

Vanessa June S. Grasse (born 27 June 1992) is an English actress. Her films include Leatherface (2017), Open 24 Hours (2018), Astral (2018), and Venice at Dawn (2022).

== Early life ==
Grasse was born in the London Borough of Camden. She has an older sister. Grasse attended Queenswood School in Hatfield and first discovered acting through a school play. She took a drama course with ArtsEd before going on to graduate with a Bachelor of Arts in English Literature and Theatre Studies from the University of Leeds in 2013.

== Career ==
Grasse played Melody Lanson in the 2015 Syfy television film Roboshark. This was followed by roles in the horror films Leatherface in 2017 as Elizabeth "Lizzy" White and Open 24 Hours and Astral in 2018 as Mary and Alyssa Hodge respectively.

In 2020, Grasse played Nell Lewis in the Channel 5 television film Agatha and the Midnight Murders and Jodie in the second series of the Sky One police procedural Bulletproof. She appeared in the 2021 Netflix romantic comedy A Castle for Christmas and the 2022 independent film Venice at Dawn. She had a role as Vatra, a Darkling loyalist, in the second season of the Netflix fantasy series Shadow and Bone.

== Filmography ==
=== Film ===
Year	Title	Role	Notes
2017	Leatherface	Elizabeth "Lizzy" White	
2018	It Came from the Desert	Lisa	
2018	Open 24 Hours	Mary	
2018	Astral	Alyssa Hodge	
2020	Glia	Beth Hudson	
2020	Grounds	Annie Desmond	Short film
2021	A Castle for Christmas	Lexi Brown	Netflix film
2022	Venice at Dawn	Sarah	

=== Television ===
Year	Title	Role	Notes
2015	Roboshark	Melody Lanson	Television film
2020	Bulletproof	Jodie	3 episodes
2020	Agatha and the Midnight Murders	Nell Lewis	Television film
2023	Shadow and Bone	Vatra	2 episodes
