= Oh Ah-yeon =

South Korean actress (born 1992)

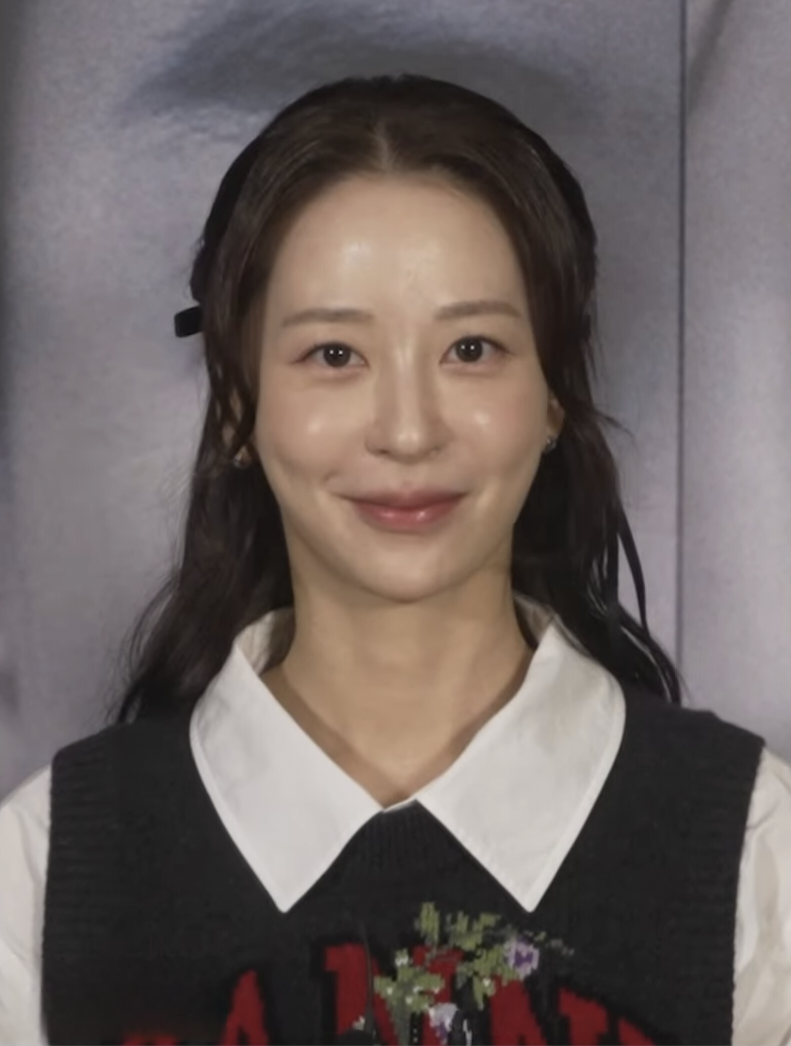
- Oh in 2025
- Born: Oh Ah-yeon; 6 March 1992 (age 34); South Korea
- Other name: Oh Ah-yun
- Education: Korea National University of Arts
- Occupation: Actress
- Years active: 2014–present
- Agent: Runup Company
- Known for: Search: WWW; Gonjiam: Haunted Asylum; Mr. Sunshine

Korean name
- Hangul: 오아연
- RR: O Ayeon
- MR: O Ayŏn

Oh Ah-yeon (Korean: 오아연) is a South Korean actress. She is known for roles in dramas, Search: WWW, Mr. Sunshine and she also appeared in movies such as Gonjiam: Haunted Asylum and Heart Blackened.

== Filmography ==
=== Television series ===
| Year | Title | Role | Ref. |
|---|---|---|---|
| 2017 | Mepsi Meow | Ji-a | |
| 2017 | Distorted | Kong Ji-won | |
| 2018 | Mr. Sunshine | So-ah | |
| 2018 | WHY | Da-in | |
| 2019 | Search: WWW | Jo Ah-ra | |

=== Film ===
| Year | Title | Role | Language | Ref. |
|---|---|---|---|---|
| 2014 | December | Ji-hye | Korean | |
| 2017 | Heart Blackened | Overseas Korean | Korean | |
| 2018 | Gonjiam: Haunted Asylum | Ah-yeon | Korean | |

=== TV film ===
| Year | Title | Role | Language | Ref. |
|---|---|---|---|---|
| 2015 | I'm After You | Manager Jeon | Korean | |
