= Padraig Reynolds =

Writer and director

Padraig Reynolds is a writer and director, known for his horror films Open 24 Hours, Dark Light, The Devil's Dolls and Rites of Spring.

== Filmography ==
Year	Film	Director	Writer	Producer	Notes
2004	Green Arrow Fan Film	Yes	Yes	Yes	Co-directed and produced
2007	The Election	Yes	Yes	No	Short film
2007	Buried Alive	No	Yes	No	Miniseries, episodes 1 and 2
2011	Rites of Spring	Yes	Yes	No	
2016	The Devil's Dolls	Yes	Yes	No	
2018	Open 24 Hours	Yes	Yes	No	
2019	Dark Light	Yes	Yes	No	
TBA	Rites of Spring 2	Yes	Yes	No	
TBA	Starvation Heights	Yes	Yes	No	Based on the true crime book by Gregg Olsen
