= Yoo Je-yoon =

South Korean actor

- Born: 18 July 1984 (age 42); Seoul, South Korea
- Other names: Jay-yoo, Yoo Je-yun
- Education: Korea National University of Arts (Department of Acting and Drama)
- Occupations: Actor; model; singer
- Years active: 2008–present
- Agent: Purple Entertainment
- Known for: A Haunting Hitchhike; Gonjiam: Haunted Asylum; Extreme Job

Yoo Je-yoon is a South Korean actor, model and singer. He is known for his role in movies such as Gonjiam: Haunted Asylum, Extreme Job, and A Hunting Hitchhike.

== Filmography ==
=== Film ===
Year	Title	Role	Language	Ref.
2017	A Haunting Hitchhike	Jung-ye	Korean	
2018	Extreme Job	Ganghwa detective	Korean	
2018	Gonjiam: Haunted Asylum	Je-yoon	Korean	
2020	And So Again Today	The Season of the Next Step	Korean	
2020	The Season of the Next Step	Je-yoon	Korean	

== Discography ==
=== Albums ===
Year	Album	Label	Notes	Ref.
2008	Laundry	Purple Entertainment	Singer, composer	
2017	Kiss You	Purple Entertainment	Singer, composer	
2018	Etc	Purple Entertainment	Singer, composer	
2018	Tears	Purple Entertainment	Singer, composer	
2021	Two Lesser	Purple Entertainment	Singer, composer	
