= Setup (storytelling) =

A setup, in storytelling, is the introduction in a plot of an element that will be useful to the story only later, when the payoff comes.

Most of the important elements that are part of the setup are usually introduced during the exposition, with which it is sometimes confused. But there can be a setup within a specific scene late in the story, with a character, object or concept appearing only to be used paragraphs or seconds later.
