= List of Karen Black performances =

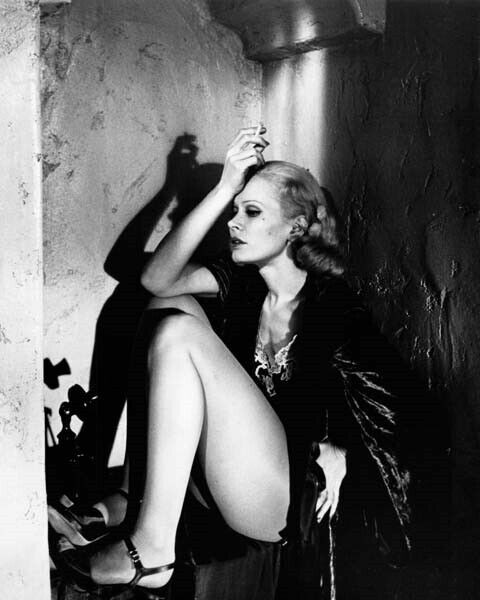
Black in The Day of the Locust (1975)

Karen Black was an American actress whose career spanned over 50 years, and included over 200 credits across film, television, and theater. She made her Broadway debut in 1965 before making her major film debut in Francis Ford Coppola's You're a Big Boy Now (1966). She subsequently appeared as an acid-tripping prostitute in Dennis Hopper's road film Easy Rider (1969), which she followed with the drama Five Easy Pieces (1970), for which she was nominated for an Academy Award and won a Golden Globe for Best Supporting Actress, and the disaster film Airport 1975 (1974). Her following role as Myrtle Wilson in Jack Clayton's The Great Gatsby (1974) won her a second Golden Globe for Best Supporting Actress.

Black starred as a glamorous country singer in Robert Altman's ensemble musical drama Nashville (1975), and as an aspiring actress in John Schlesinger's drama The Day of the Locust (1975), which earned her a third Golden Globe nomination. She subsequently appeared in three roles in Dan Curtis's anthology horror film Trilogy of Terror (1975), followed by Curtis's supernatural horror feature, Burnt Offerings (1976). The same year, she played a kidnapping accomplice in Alfred Hitchcock's final film, Family Plot.

In 1982, Black starred as a transsexual in Altman's drama Come Back to the Five and Dime, Jimmy Dean, Jimmy Dean, followed by a lead in Tobe Hooper's remake of Invaders from Mars (1986). She also appeared on television, guest-starring on such series as E/R (1984–1985), Murder, She Wrote (1987), and Miami Vice (1989). Throughout the 1990s, Black appeared in a wide variety of independent and experimental films, a trend she continued into the 2000s. Her role as a murderous mother in Rob Zombie's House of 1000 Corpses (2003) helped cement her status as a cult horror icon. She continued to appear in low-profile films throughout the early 2010s before her death in 2013.

== Film ==
Karen Black film credits
| Year | Title | Role | Director(s) | Notes | Ref. |
|---|---|---|---|---|---|
| 1960 | The Prime Time | Betty – Painted Woman | Gordon Weisenborn | | |
| 1966 | You're a Big Boy Now | Amy Partlett | Francis Ford Coppola | | |
| 1969 | Hard Contract | Ellen | S. Lee Pogostin | | |
| 1969 | Easy Rider | Karen | Dennis Hopper | | |
| 1970 | Five Easy Pieces | Rayette Dipesto | Bob Rafelson | | |
| 1971 | Drive, He Said | Olive | Jack Nicholson | | |
| 1971 | A Gunfight | Jenny Simms | Lamont Johnson | | |
| 1971 | Born to Win | Parm | Ivan Passer | | |
| 1972 | Cisco Pike | Sue | Bill L. Norton | | |
| 1972 | Portnoy's Complaint | Mary Jane Reid | Ernest Lehman | | |
| 1973 | Little Laura and Big John | Laura | Luke Moberly; Bob Woodburn | | |
| 1973 | The Pyx | Elizabeth Lucy | Harvey Hart | | |
| 1973 | The Outfit | Bett Harrow | John Flynn | | |
| 1974 | Rhinoceros | Daisy | Tom O'Horgan | | |
| 1974 | The Great Gatsby | Myrtle Wilson | Jack Clayton | | |
| 1974 | Law and Disorder | Gloria | Ivan Passer | | |
| 1974 | Airport 1975 | Nancy Pryor | Jack Smight | | |
| 1975 | Trilogy of Terror | Julie / Millicent Larimore/ Therese Larimore / Amelia | Dan Curtis | Television film | |
| 1975 | The Day of the Locust | Faye Greener | John Schlesinger | | |
| 1975 | Nashville | Connie White | Robert Altman | | |
| 1976 | Crime and Passion | Susan Winters | Ivan Passer | | |
| 1976 | Family Plot | Fran | Alfred Hitchcock | | |
| 1976 | Burnt Offerings | Marian Rolf | Dan Curtis | | |
| 1977 | Capricorn One | Judy Drinkwater | Peter Hyams | | |
| 1977 | The Strange Possession of Mrs. Oliver | Miriam Oliver | Gordon Hessler | Television film | |
| 1978 | Because He's My Friend | Anne | Ralph Nelson | Television film | |
| 1978 | The Rip-Off | Clarisse Saunders | Antonio Margheriti | Also known as: The Squeeze | |
| 1978 | In Praise of Older Women | Maya | George Kaczender | | |
| 1979 | Killer Fish | Kate Neville | Antonio Margheriti | | |
| 1979 | The Last Word | Paula Herbert | Roy Boulting | | |
| 1979 | Mr. Horn | Ernestina Crawford | Jack Starrett | Television film | |
| 1980 | Police Story: Confessions of a Lady Cop | Officer Evelyn Carter | Lee H. Katzin | Television film Also known as: The Other Side of Fear | |
| 1980 | Power | Rose Vanda-Buchanan | Barry Shear; Virgil W. Vogel | Television film | |
| 1980 | Where the Ladies Go | Helen | Theodore J. Flicker | Television film | |
| 1981 | Separate Ways | Valentine Colby | Howard Avedis | | |
| 1981 | Killing Heat | Mary Turner | Michael Raeburn | Also known as: The Grass is Singing | |
| 1981 | Chanel Solitaire | Émilienne d'Alençon | George Kaczender | | |
| 1982 | The Last Horror Film | Herself | David Winters | Uncredited | |
| 1982 | Come Back to the 5 & Dime, Jimmy Dean, Jimmy Dean | Joanne | Robert Altman | | |
| 1982 | Miss Right | Amy | Paul Williams | | |
| 1983 | Can She Bake a Cherry Pie? | Zee | Henry Jaglom | | |
| 1984 | Bad Manners | Gladys Fitzpatrick | Robert Houston | Also known as: Growing Pains | |
| 1984 | A Stroke of Genius | | Jyll Rosenfeld | | |
| 1984 | There's Something Wrong in Paradise | Gina Gina | | Television musical film with Kid Creole | |
| 1984 | Full Circle Again | Unknown | William Fruet | Television film; co-starring with Robert Vaughn | |
| 1985 | Martin's Day | Karen | Alan Gibson | | |
| 1985 | Cut and Run | Karin | Ruggero Deodato | Italian title: Inferno in diretta | |
| 1985 | The Blue Man | Janus | George Mihalka | Also known as: Eternal Evil | |
| 1985 | Savage Dawn | Rachel | Simon Nuchtern | | |
| 1986 | The Flight of the Spruce Goose | Gloria | Lech Majewski | | |
| 1986 | Invaders from Mars | Linda Magnusson | Tobe Hooper | | |
| 1986 | Hostage | Laura Lawrence | Hanro Möhr; Percival Rubens | | |
| 1987 | It's Alive III: Island of the Alive | Ellen Jarvis | Larry Cohen | | |
| 1988 | The Invisible Kid | Deborah Dunn | Avery Krounse | | |
| 1988 | Dixie Lanes | Zelma Putnam | Don Cato | | |
| 1988 | Out of the Dark | Ruth Wilson | Michael Schroeder | | |
| 1989 | Homer and Eddie | Belle | Andrei Konchalovsky | | |
| 1989 | The Legendary Life of Ernest Hemingway | Martha Gelhorn | José María Sánchez | | |
| 1989 | Trust Me | Jilter woman | Robert Houston | | |
| 1990 | Overexposed | Mrs. Trowbridge | Larry Brand | | |
| 1990 | Twisted Justice | Mrs. Granger | David Heavener | | |
| 1990 | Zapped Again! | Substitute Teacher | Doug Campbell | | |
| 1990 | Night Angel | Rita | Dominique Othenin-Girard | | |
| 1990 | Club Fed | Sally Rich | Nat Christian | | |
| 1990 | Mirror, Mirror | Susan Gordon | Marina Sargenti | | |
| 1990 | Pretty Hattie's Baby | | Ivan Passer | Unreleased | |
| 1990 | The Children | Sybil Lullmer | Tony Palmer | | |
| 1990 | The Covenant | | Chris Peschken | | |
| 1990 | Haunting Fear | Dr. Julia Harcourt | Fred Olen Ray | | |
| 1990 | Fatal Encounter | Joan Caldwell | Henri Charr | | |
| 1990 | Evil Spirits | Ella Purdy | Gary Graver | | |
| 1991 | Quiet Fire | Kim Martino | Lawrence Hilton-Jacobs | | |
| 1991 | The Killer's Edge | Barrett | Joseph Merhi | | |
| 1991 | Dead Girls Don't Tango | Inspector Wilson | John Carr | | |
| 1991 | Caged Fear | Blanche | Robert Houston | Also known as: Hotel Oklahoma | |
| 1991 | Rubin & Ed | Rula | Trent Harris | | |
| 1991 | Children of the Night | Karen Thompson | Tony Randel | | |
| 1991 | The Roller Blade Seven | Tarot | Donald G. Jackson | | |
| 1992 | The Player | Herself | Robert Altman | | |
| 1992 | Tuesday Never Comes | Michelle | Jason Holt | | |
| 1992 | Judgement | Tiffany Powers | William Sachs | Also known as: Hitz | |
| 1992 | Auntie Lee's Meat Pies | Auntie Lee | Joseph F. Robertson | | |
| 1992 | The Legend of the Roller Blade Seven | Tarot | Donald G. Jackson | | |
| 1992 | The Double 0 Kid | Mrs. Elliot | Dee McLachlan | | |
| 1993 | Bound and Gagged: A Love Story | Carla | Daniel B. Appleby | | |
| 1993 | The Trust | Maria Vandermeer | Neil Havens; Douglas Killgore | | |
| 1993 | Return of the Roller Blade Seven | Tarot | Donald G. Jackson | | |
| 1993 | Movies Money Murder | Bettie | Stephen Eckelberry; Arthur Webb | Also producer Also known as: Breaking Up with Paul | |
| 1994 | Too Bad About Jack | Inspector Wilson | John Carr | | |
| 1995 | Plan 10 from Outer Space | Nehor | Trent Harris | | |
| 1995 | The Wacky Adventures of Dr. Boris and Nurse Shirley | Evelyn | Paul Leder | | |
| 1995 | Dream Catcher | | John Piedlow | | |
| 1995 | Starstruck | Bertha | David Steiner | | |
| 1996 | Sister Island | Rose Walsh | Avery Crounse | Also known as: Cries Of Silence | |
| 1996 | Crimetime | Millicent Hargrave | George Sluizer | | |
| 1996 | Children of the Corn IV: The Gathering | June Rhodes | Greg Spence | | |
| 1996 | Every Minute is Goodbye | Schubert | Ulli Lommel | | |
| 1996 | Dinosaur Valley Girls | Ro-Kell | Donald F. Glut | | |
| 1996 | New York Crossing | Mrs. Tender | Vinicius Mainardi | Television film Spanish title: Un angelo a New York | |
| 1997 | Greater Than a Tiger | Paige | Keith Odett | Short film | |
| 1997 | Stir | Dr. Gabrielle Kessler | Rodion Nakhapetov | | |
| 1997 | Conceiving Ada | Lady Byron; Mother Coer | Lynn Hershman Leeson | | |
| 1997 | Men | Alex | Zoe Clarke-Williams | Also screenwriter | |
| 1997 | Dogtown | Rose Van Horn | George Hickenlooper | | |
| 1997 | Modern Rhapsody | Consuelo | Andrea Alvarez; Elly Friedman | | |
| 1998 | Invisible Dad | Courtney Whitmer | Fred Olen Ray | | |
| 1998 | I Woke Up Early The Day I Died | Whip Lady | Aris Iliopolous | | |
| 1998 | Sugar: The Fall of the West | | James Frey | | |
| 1998 | My Neighbor's Daughter | Social Worker | Steven Kovacs | Television film | |
| 1998 | Bury the Evidence | The Mother | J. Greg De Felice | | |
| 1998 | Malaika | Jessica Martin | Marina Martins | | |
| 1998 | Charades | Jude | Stephen Eckelberry | | |
| 1998 | Waiting for Dr. MacGuffin | Dental Assistant | David Ondaatje | Short film | |
| 1998 | Lightspeed | High Priestess | Roger Mende | | |
| 1999 | The Underground Comedy Movie | Mother | Vince Offer | | |
| 1999 | Mascara | Aunt Eloise | Linda Kandel | | |
| 1999 | Paradise Cove | Ma | Robert Clapsadle | | |
| 2000 | Fallen Arches | Lucy Romano | Ron Cosentino | | |
| 2000 | Red Dirt | Aunt Summer | Tag Purvis | | |
| 2000 | Oliver Twisted | Mrs. Mary Happ | Dean Gates | | |
| 2000 | Inviati speciali | | Fred Olen Ray | | |
| 2000 | The Independent | Herself | Stephen Kessler | | |
| 2001 | The Donor | Mrs. Springle | Jean-Marie Pallardy | | |
| 2001 | Gypsy 83 | Bambi LeBleau | Todd Stephens | | |
| 2001 | Hard Luck | Aunt Judy | Jack Rubio | | |
| 2001 | Soulkeeper | Magnificent Martha | Darin Ferriola | Television film | |
| 2002 | Teknolust | Dirty Dick | Lynn Hershman Leeson | | |
| 2002 | Curse of the Forty-Niner | Aunt Nelly | John Carl Buechler | | |
| 2002 | All Hallow's Eve | | | | |
| 2003 | House of 1000 Corpses | Mother Firefly | Rob Zombie | | |
| 2003 | Paris | Chantrelle | Ramin Niami | | |
| 2003 | Buttleman | Mrs. Buttleman | Francis Stokes | Also known as: Don't Try This at Home | |
| 2003 | Summer Solstice | Dr. Sally McDermott | George Fivas | | |
| 2004 | America Brown | Marianne Brown | Paul Black | | |
| 2004 | Birth of Industry | Sara | Gabriela Tollman | Short film | |
| 2005 | Love Wine | Aunt Anita | Mark McNabb | Television film | |
| 2005 | Carma | Kate Burns | Ray Arthur Wang | Voice | |
| 2005 | My Suicidal Sweetheart | Grace's Mom | Michael Parness | Also known as: Crazy for Love; Max & Grace | |
| 2005 | Trailer for a Remake of Gore Vidal's Caligula | Agrippina | Francesco Vezzoli | Short film | |
| 2005 | Firecracker | Sandra; Eleanor | Steve Balderson | | |
| 2005 | The Straun House | Molly | Jeff Broadstreet | Also known as: Dr. Rage | |
| 2006 | Hollywood Dreams | Luna | Henry Jaglom | | |
| 2006 | Read You Like a Book | Kate | Robert N. Zagone | | |
| 2006 | Whitepaddy | Mrs. Leider | Geretta Geretta | | |
| 2007 | Suffering Man's Charity | Renee | Alan Cumming | | |
| 2007 | One Long Night | Barbara | David Siqueiros | | |
| 2008 | Contamination | Mavis | Rodion Nakhapetov | | |
| 2008 | Watercolors | Mrs. Martin | David Oliveras | | |
| 2008 | A Single Woman | Storyteller | Kamala Lopez | | |
| 2009 | The Blue Tooth Virgin | Zena | Russell Brown | | |
| 2009 | Meet the Eye | | Aïda Ruilova | Short film | |
| 2009 | Irene in Time | Sheila Shivvers | Henry Jaglom | | |
| 2009 | Repo Chick | Aunt de la Chasse | Alex Cox | | |
| 2009 | Stuck! | Next Door Neighbor Lady | Steve Balderson | | |
| 2009 | Double Duty | Annabelle | Stephen Eckelberry | | |
| 2009 | First Time Long Time | Dr. Shneidel | James Demo | Short film | |
| 2010 | Better People | Marci | Dorsay Alavi | Television film | |
| 2010 | Nothing Special | May | Angela Garcia Combs | | |
| 2011 | Some Guy Who Kills People | Ruth Boyd | Jack Perez | | |
| 2011 | Letters from the Big Man | Sean's Colleague | Christopher Münch | | |
| 2011 | Maria My Love | Maria | Jasmine McGlade | | |
| 2012 | Mommy's Little Monster | Mrs. Melnick | Marshall E. Uzzle | | |
| 2012 | Warnings from the Bathtub | Mother | Elizabeth Appell; Mickey Freeman | Short film | |
| 2012 | Vacationland | Louise Bergen | Jaime Hook | | |
| 2012 | Dark Blood | Motel Woman | George Sluizer | Filmed in 1993 | |
| 2013 | OowieWanna | The Donna | Bridget Palardy | Short film | |
| 2013 | Ooga Booga | Mrs. Allardyce | Charles Band | | |
| 2013 | She Loves Me Not | Karla | Brian Jun; Jack Sanderson | | |
| 2013 | Bottomless Pit | Herself | Zach Hill | Unfinished film, shot for musical group Death Grips | |
| 2014 | Wild in Blue | Justine | Matthew Berkowitz | | |
| 2014 | A Walk Into a Split Mind | Karen | | Installment in multi-film series The Being Experience | |

== Television ==
Karen Black television series credits
| Year | Title | Role | Notes | Ref. |
|---|---|---|---|---|
| 1967 | The F.B.I. | Lorraine Chapman | Episode: "The Satellite" | |
| 1967 | Run for Your Life | Jennifer Palmer | Episode: "Tell It to the Dead" | |
| 1967 | The Big Valley | Carla | Episode: "Days of Grace" | |
| 1967 | The Second Hundred Years | Marcia | 2 episodes | |
| 1967 | The Invaders | Claudia Stone | Episode: "The Ransom" | |
| 1967 | Iron Horse | Patricia Dunne | Episode: "The Prisoners" | |
| 1968 | Mannix | Elaine Tate | Episode: "License to Kill – Limit Three People" | |
| 1968 | Judd, for the Defense | Alethea Staunton | Episode: "The Devil's Surrogate" | |
| 1968 | Adam-12 | Susan Decker | Episode: "Log 132: Producer" | |
| 1969 | The Name of the Game | Monica Garrison | Episode: "Give Till It Hurts" | |
| 1972 | Ghost Story | Barbara Sanders | Episode: "Bad Connection" | |
| 1976–1981 | Saturday Night Live | Herself | 4 episodes | |
| 1984–1985 | E/R | Sheila Sheinfeld | 3 episodes | |
| 1985–1987 | Faerie Tale Theatre | Sea Witch / Interviewee | 2 episodes | |
| 1986 | Murder, She Wrote | Dr. Sylvia Dunn | Episode: "One Good Bid Deserves a Murder" | |
| 1987 | Worlds Beyond | Lee Jeffreys | Episode: "Suffer, Little Children" | |
| 1989 | Miami Vice | Helen Jackson | Episode: "Victims of Circumstance" | |
| 1991 | ABC Weekend Special | Miss Kuchenbacker | Episode: "Ralph S. Mouse" | |
| 1993 | In the Heat of the Night | Carla Ray | Episode: "A Dish Best Served Cold" | |
| 1993 | Moon Over Miami | Lorraine Pitzer | Episode: "Watching the Detectives" | |
| 1997 | The Hunger | Miss Gati / Landlady | Episode: "Menage a Trois" | |
| 1998 | Profiler | Evie Long | Episode: "Cycle of Violence" | |
| 1998 | Party of Five | Doreen Jablonsky | Episode: "One Christmas, to Go" | |
| 1999 | Rude Awakening | Crystal Garcia | 2 episodes | |
| 2003 | Law & Order: Criminal Intent | Vera Morgan | Episode: "Con-Text" | |
| 2003 | Russians in the City of Angels | Patricia Sommers | Episode: "Priklyuchenie" | |
| 2010 | Tim and Eric Awesome Show, Great Job! | Jennifer | Episode: "Choices" | |
| 2010 | Funny or Die Presents | Debbie Rubbie | Episode: "8" (Magical Balloon) | |

== Stage ==
Karen Black stage credits
| Year | Title | Role | Notes | Ref. |
|---|---|---|---|---|
| 1961 | Take Her, She's Mine | Liza Michaelson / Linda Lehman / Adele McDougall (understudy) | Biltmore Theatre | |
| 1965 | The Playroom | Judy | Brooks Atkinson Theatre | |
| 1966 | Happily Never After | Sarah Mills | Eugene O'Neill Theatre | |
| 1967 | Keep It in the Family | Hilda Brady | Plymouth Theatre | |
| 1982 | Come Back to the Five and Dime, Jimmy Dean, Jimmy Dean | Joanne | Martin Beck Theater | |

== Sources ==
- Armstrong, Richard B.; Armstrong, Mary Williams (2015). Encyclopedia of Film Themes, Settings and Series. Jefferson, North Carolina: McFarland. ISBN 978-1-476-61230-0.
- Curti, Roberto (2013). Italian Crime Filmography, 1968-1980. Jefferson, North Carolina: McFarland. ISBN 978-1-476-61208-9.
- Gale, Thomson (2007). Video Sourcebook (39th ed.). Detroit, Michigan: Gale Publishing Group. ISBN 978-1-414-40099-0.
- Segrave, Kerry; Martin, Linda (1990). The Post-Feminist Hollywood Actress: Biographies and Filmographies of Stars Born After 1939. Jefferson, North Carolina: McFarland. ISBN 978-0-899-50387-5.
- Terrace, Vincent; Parish, James Robert (1989). The Complete Actors' Television Credits, 1948-1988 – Actresses. Vol. 2. Metuchen, New Jersey: Scarecrow Press. ISBN 978-0-810-8225-80.
- Riggs, Thomas (2000). Contemporary Theatre, Film and Television. Vol. 31. Detroit, Michigan: Gale Publishing Group. ISBN 978-0-787-64636-3.
- Weldon, Michael (1996). The Psychotronic Video Guide To Film. New York: Macmillan. ISBN 978-0-312-13149-4.
