= Bullfighter (film) =

- Directed by: Rune Bendixen
- Written by: L. M. Kit Carson; Hunter Carson
- Story by: Rune Bendixen
- Produced by: Majken Gilmartin; L.M. Kit Carson; Cynthia Hargrave
- Starring: Olivier Martinez; Michelle Forbes; Donnie Wahlberg; Robert Rodriguez; Willem Dafoe
- Cinematography: Ronn Schmidt
- Production companies: MainPix; Scanbox Danmark
- Distributed by: Universal Pictures Home Entertainment
- Release date: January 4, 2005
- Running time: 90 minutes
- Country: United States
- Language: English

Bullfighter is a 2005 American action adventure fantasy film directed by Rune Bendixen and starring Olivier Martinez, Michelle Forbes, Donnie Wahlberg, Robert Rodriguez and Willem Dafoe. It is Bendixen's feature directorial debut.

== Cast ==
- Willem Dafoe as Father Ramirez
- Michael Parks as Cordobes
- Jared Harris as Jones
- Domenica Cameron-Scorsese as Laila
- Robert Rodriguez as Bullboy #1
- Guillermo del Toro as Bullboy #2
- Olivier Martinez as Jacques
- Michelle Forbes as Mary
- Donnie Wahlberg as Chollo
- Assumpta Serna as Ahandra / Allison
- Rune Bendixen as Bullboy #3

== Production ==
The film was shot across the Rio Grande in Texas starting on February 12, 1999.

== Release ==
The film was released direct-to-DVD on January 4, 2005.
