= Invaders from Mars (1986 film) =

1986 film by Tobe Hooper

- Theatrical release poster
- Directed by: Tobe Hooper
- Written by: Dan O'Bannon; Don Jakoby
- Based on: Invaders from Mars (1953 film) by John Tucker Battle; Richard Blake
- Produced by: Yoram Globus; Menahem Golan
- Starring: Karen Black; Hunter Carson; Timothy Bottoms; Laraine Newman; James Karen; Bud Cort; Louise Fletcher
- Cinematography: Daniel Pearl
- Edited by: Alain Jakubowicz
- Music by: Christopher Young; Dave Storrs
- Production company: Cannon Films
- Distributed by: Cannon Film Distributors
- Release date: June 6, 1986 (USA)
- Running time: 100 minutes
- Country: United States
- Language: English
- Budget: $7 million
- Box office: $4.9 million (domestic)

Invaders from Mars is a 1986 American science fiction horror film directed by Tobe Hooper from a screenplay by Dan O'Bannon and Don Jakoby, and starring Hunter Carson, Karen Black, Timothy Bottoms, Laraine Newman, James Karen, Bud Cort and Louise Fletcher. It is a remake of the 1953 film of the same name.

The film was part of a three-picture deal between Hooper and Cannon Films. Its production was instigated by Wade H. Williams III, millionaire exhibitor, science fiction film fan and sometime writer-producer-director, who had reissued the original film in 1978 after purchasing the copyright to the property. Elaborate creature and visual effects were supplied by Stan Winston and John Dykstra. The score was composed by Christopher Young and Dave Storrs.

The film was released in the United States on June 6, 1986. It received mixed-to-negative reviews from critics and was a box-office disappointment, though in the years since its release it has developed a cult following.

== Plot ==
George Gardner encourages his 12-year-old son David's dreams of becoming an astronaut by stargazing with him. A thunderstorm wakes David, and he observes a strange alien spaceship landing on Copper Hill, just beyond the house. His father agrees to investigate, but returns behaving strangely and with an unexplained mark on the back of his neck. David's mother Helen and others soon become similarly changed from their normal selves, worrying David.

At school, David discovers that his teacher Mrs. McKeltch and classmate Heather have also been changed. David shares his fears with Nurse Linda Magnusson after seeing she has no neck mark. Linda is skeptical, but begins to share David's concern after seeing the change in Mrs. McKeltch and his parents. After evading capture by Mrs. McKeltch, David follows her to a cave in Copper Hill and discovers that the alien ship is real, crewed by brutish drones and their large-brained leader who is controlling many people around the town via brain implants inserted through the neck. David flees and reveals what he has learned to Linda. The two of them investigate further and decide to seek outside help.

David and Linda meet with General Climet Wilson, commander of the military base that employs David's father. The general begins to believe them when two alien abductees at the site are exposed, confronted, and die from the kill switches in their implants activating. Wilson meets with NASA and SETI scientists who insist on proceeding with a scheduled launch to Mars, but the rocket is destroyed by a bomb planted by George. The scientists conclude that the Martians interpreted the launch as an act of war and are invading Earth preemptively.

Wilson leads his troops against the alien encampment at Copper Hill. While they prepare for a raid, David and Linda are captured by the Martians, prompting Wilson to launch a rescue mission. After unsuccessfully pleading with the Martian leader, David escapes while an unconscious Linda is prepped for implantation. David leads Wilson's force to the control room where a short but intense battle occurs, in which Mrs. McKeltch is eaten by one of the aliens. Linda is rescued and the invaders are forced to initiate a retreat. The human survivors plant charges and flee the ship as its liftoff sequence begins. David runs for the safety of his home, pursued by his parents, still under alien control. As the rising alien ship explodes, David's parents recover and try to protect him as the massive fireball races toward them.

Suddenly, David awakens in his bedroom. His parents assure him that his ordeal was just a dream and leave him to continue sleeping. However, David soon sees the same alien ship appear. He runs to his parents' room and screams in horror at what he sees.

== Cast ==
- Karen Black as Linda Magnuson
- Hunter Carson as David Gardner
- Timothy Bottoms as George Gardner
- Laraine Newman as Ellen Gardner
- James Karen as General Climet Wilson
- Bud Cort as Dr. Mark Weinstein
- Louise Fletcher as Mrs. McKeltch
- Eric Pierpoint as Sergeant Major Rinaldi
- Christopher Allport as Captain Curtis
- Donald Hotton as Old NASA Scientist
- Kenneth Kimmins as Officer Kenney
- Charlie Dell as Mr. Cross
- Jimmy Hunt as The Police Chief
- Virginia Keehne as Heather
- Chris Hebert as Kevin
- Mason Nupuf as Doug
- William Frankfather as Ed
- Eric Norris as M.P.
- Debra Berger as Corporal Walker
- Edward Donno as Hollis
- Larry Poindexter as Marine #3
- Dale Dye as Squad Leader
- Scott Leva as Marine Officer
- Debbie Lee Carrington, Tony Cox, and Phil Fondacaro as Martian Drones

== Production ==
=== Development ===
A remake of Invaders from Mars was initiated by Wade H. Williams III, who obtained the rights to the original film for a 1978 re-release. Jay Weston was initially attached to producer, with Joe Alves as director, before the rights were sold to the Cannon Group. A lifelong fan of the original film, Tobe Hooper took on the project as part of a three-picture deal with Cannon, preceded by Lifeforce (1985) and followed by The Texas Chainsaw Massacre 2 (1986).

The film contains several direct homages to the original film. Jimmy Hunt, the actor who starred as young David MacLean in the original 1953 film, made a cameo appearance as the police chief. It was Hunt's first acting role in over 30 years. The name of the elementary school, W.C. Menzies Elementary School, is after the original film's director William Cameron Menzies. The "Supreme Intelligence" prop from the original film appears in the school basement. It was loaned to the producers by collector Bob Burns III.

The film also has several nods to Invasion of the Body Snatchers (1956), a similarly-themed film, including an alien pod prop and the name of the town, Santa Mira, California. Dan O'Bannon and Don Jakoby wrote the screenplay. During shooting, the script was re-written by David Womark.

=== Casting ===
Director Tobe Hooper knew child actor Hunter Carson, as he was friends with his parents L. M. Kit Carson and Karen Black (the elder Carson later co-wrote The Texas Chainsaw Massacre 2). Hooper was convinced to hire him after seeing his performance in the film Paris, Texas. James Karen had previously worked with Hooper on Poltergeist (1982).

Director of photography Daniel Pearl had previously worked with Hooper on the original The Texas Chain Saw Massacre. In the intervening years, Pearl had become a prominent cinematographer of music videos, and Hooper hired him because he wanted a "rock video look and feel."

Dale Dye was the film's military advisor, leading the cast in an 11-week boot camp prior to shooting. He plays a minor role in the film as a Marine squad leader. Most of the Marines in the movie were real Marines who were stationed in the Los Angeles area at the time the movie was shot.

=== Filming ===
Principal photography took place in locations throughout Southern California. The Gardners' house was the "Blandings house" at Malibu Creek State Park (34°5′41.4″N 118°42′43.63″W ), so-called for having been originally built for the 1948 film Mr. Blandings Builds His Dream House. It is currently used as an administrative office for the park and the Santa Monica Mountains Conservancy. A replica of the house and hill were constructed at Hollywood Center Studio for night and special effects scenes.

Interior sets were constructed at a converted airplane hangar on Terminal Island, originally built to house Howard Hughes' Spruce Goose. The Martian spaceship interior measured 75 feet wide, 150 feet long and 45 feet high.

The scenes shot on location at David's school were filmed at Eagle Rock Elementary School in the Eagle Rock neighborhood of Los Angeles, California. Other locations included Simi Valley. The Marine Corps Air Station El Toro was featured in the movie as the base the Marines came from.

=== Special and visual effects ===
The creature effects were created by Stan Winston. The Martian "drone" aliens were designed to have inverted leg joints, realized by having a suit performer wear the costume backwards, while a second puppeteer operated the face. The two performers would then move back-to-back. Midway through filming, Winston had to leave the production due to prior commitments to Aliens, and Alec Gillis supervised the latter part of the shoot.

The visual effects were supervised by John Dykstra, who had previously worked on Lifeforce. Dykstra's team constructed two scale miniature UFOs, one was nine feet and the other was three feet. Originally, the ending showed David Gardner (Carson)'s parents George (Timothy Bottoms) and Ellen (Laraine Newman) eaten by drones. However, the scene was never shot due to time constraints with the effects.

=== Music ===
Michael Kamen, who had written additional music for the American re-edit of Lifeforce, was the producer's first choice of composer. When he proved unavailable, Christopher Young was hired instead. Young was given only 23 days to complete the score. He wrote and recorded 15 minutes of orchestral music and 30 minutes of electronic music, which was written in a musique concrète style.

While the producers liked the orchestral score, they disliked the electronic music, and had much of it replaced with compositions by musician Dave Storrs, who had written music for several Cannon Films trailers.

== Release ==
=== Box office ===
Invaders from Mars was released on June 6, 1986, opening in seventh place. In total, it earned $4,884,663 at the US box office, a loss from its $7,000,000 budget.

=== Home media ===
Scream Factory (under license from MGM) released the film for the first time on Blu-ray in the US on April 7, 2015.

=== Reception ===
Nina Darnton wrote in The New York Times that Hooper "knows how to construct a horror film so it builds to a screaming pitch" and also praised the "excellent cast," but thought that when the Martians are finally revealed, "the film becomes less terrifying. We get lost in the complexities of the inventions and finally they seem overdone and overproduced." Variety panned the film as "an embarrassing combination of kitsch and boredom," adding that a remake of the 1953 original was a reasonable idea but "Dan O'Bannon and Don Jakoby's inferior screenplay fails to bring in new ideas or provide interesting dialog. The story elements here have been done to death in the interim." Sid Smith of the Chicago Tribune gave the film 3 stars out of 4 and wrote, "Much of what is lovable about Hooper's fun, scary and refreshingly silly movie is all its in-jokes." Michael Wilmington of the Los Angeles Times stated, "If you can tap into Hooper's oddball rhythms and cold sendups, you can enjoy yourself. And, though the 1953 Invaders was an effective movie, it's not really the classic that people remember. Except for Menzies' superb production designs, everything in the remake is better: the acting, the camerawork, definitely the Martians. It may not grip audiences in the same way, but that's because Hooper is trying something harder, a conscious campiness that's tough to bring off."

Paul Attanasio of The Washington Post wrote that "despite its occasional sparkle, Invaders From Mars is an overlong movie with a tiny spirit. It plays to a certain smug superiority of an audience nurtured on junky television, and while that smugness is in some ways justified—movies like the original Invaders From Mars had their obvious failings—it's also, over the course of a feature film, more than a little annoying." Time Out wrote, "... whereas the original worked by building up an increasingly black mood, this version relies almost entirely on the special effects; and such limited brooding tension as it has is gratuitously undermined by a string of sequences played purely for laughs". Thomas Kent Miller in his book Mars in the Movies called it "unredeemingly [sic] awful [if seen for the first time by a 21st century adult]. Otherwise, some children who saw it for the first time, with little or no knowledge of the 1953 version, derive much pleasure from the film."

As of April 2021 the film holds a 38% approval rating at film review aggregator website Rotten Tomatoes based on 16 reviews.

It was nominated for two awards at the 7th Golden Raspberry Awards, including Worst Supporting Actress for Louise Fletcher and Worst Visual Effects.

== Novelization ==
A novelization of Invaders from Mars, by horror novelist Ray Garton, was published by Pocket Books in the United States and Grafton Books in the United Kingdom.

== See also ==
- List of American films of 1986
