= Starstruck =

Starstruck may refer to:

== Television ==
- Starstruck, a 1981 ABC Afterschool Special
- StarStruck (2000 TV series), an Australian talent show
- StarStruck (Philippine TV series), a 2003 reality talent competition show
- StarStruck (2005 TV series), an Australian talent show based on the British show Stars in Their Eyes
- Starstruck (2021 TV series), a British sitcom written and directed by comedian Rose Matafeo
- Starstruck (2022 TV series), a British reformatted version of Stars in Their Eyes
- "Starstruck" (Star Trek: Prodigy), a 2021 episode
- "Star Struck" (Law & Order), a 1992 episode

== Film ==
- Starstruck (1982 film), an Australian musical comedy
- Star Struck, a 1994 television film starring Chelsea Noble
- Starstruck, a 1995 film featuring Karen Black
- Starstruck (1998 film), a film starring Jamie Kennedy
- Starstruck (2010 film), a Disney Channel Original Movie

== Literature and theatre ==
- Starstruck (play), a 1980 play by Elaine Lee
  - Starstruck (comics), a comic-book series based on the play
- Starstruck, a 1996 novel by Richie Tankersley Cusick
- Starstruck, a 1998 play by Roy Williams
- Starstruck, a 2005 Truth, Dare, Kiss or Promise novel by Cathy Hopkins
- Starstruck, a 2013 novel by Brenda Hiatt
- Star Struck, a 2005 novel by Pamela Anderson

== Songs ==
- "Starstruck" (Kinks song), 1968
- "Starstruck" (Years & Years song), 2021
- "Starstruck", by Rainbow from Rising, 1976
- "Starstruck", by Jeffree Star, 2008
- "Starstruck", by Lady Gaga from The Fame, 2008
- "Starstruck", by Robbie Williams from Reality Killed the Video Star, 2009
- "Starstruck", by Sterling Knight from the soundtrack of the 2010 film of the same name
- "Starstruck", by Sorry from 925, 2020
- "Starstrukk", by 3OH!3 and Katy Perry, 2009

== Other uses ==
- Starstruck (company), who attempted low-cost orbital sea-launched hybrid rocket launches
- Starstruck, the winning demo at the 2006 Assembly demo party
- Starstruck Entertainment, a management company founded by Reba McEntire
