= Hunter Carson =

American actor (born 1975)

- Born: December 26, 1975 (age 50); Culver City, California, U.S.
- Education: Wesleyan University
- Occupations: Actor, screenwriter, film producer
- Years active: 1983–present
- Spouse: Elyse Tyler (m. 2011)
- Children: 3
- Parents: Karen Black; L. M. Kit Carson
- Relatives: Gail Brown (aunt); Cynthia Hargrave (stepmother)

Hunter Carson (born December 26, 1975) is an American actor and director.

== Early life ==
Carson was born in Culver City, California, the son of actress Karen Black and actor, producer, screenwriter and director L. M. Kit Carson. He made his first national appearance in October 1976, at the age of nine months, when his mother hosted Saturday Night Live; she held him in her arms for the entirety of her opening monologue.

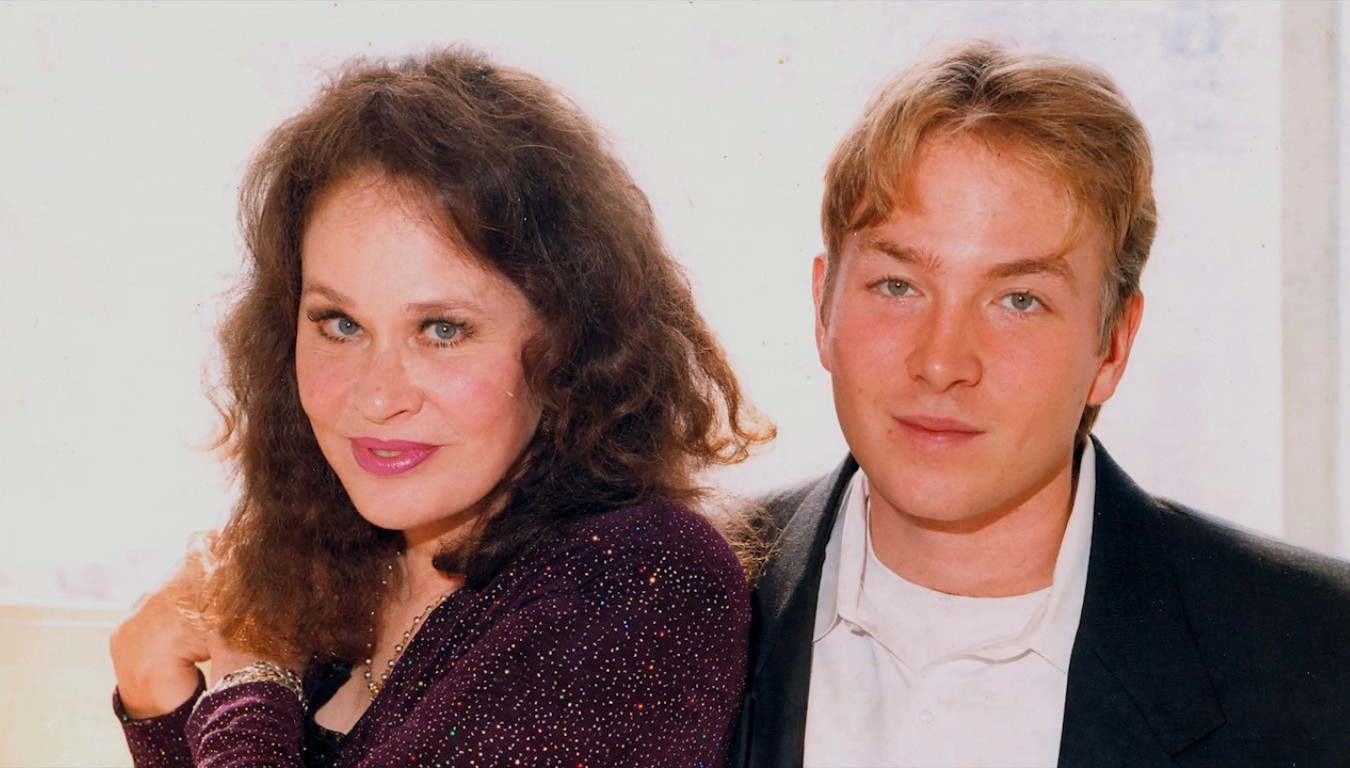
Carson with mother Karen Black, 1999

== Career ==
His first acting role was in the 1984 film Paris, Texas, portraying the character of Hunter Henderson. The film was co-written for the screen by his father. He then starred in the 1986 remake of Invaders from Mars, where he co-starred with his mother Karen Black, He co-directed with Alejandro Itkin the 2013 feature film Single in South Beach, a romantic drama starring Kevin Sorbo. He also directed the short With It (2004), about a failed hitman.
