= Bob Elmore =

American stuntman (1952 – 2025)

Bob Elmore (November 14, 1952 – June 28, 2025) was an American stuntman.

== Life and career ==
Elmore was born in Southern California and began working in the Wild West Show at Knotts Berry Farm.

Elmore began working as a stuntman during the 1980s, being credited on Police Academy 2: Their First Assignment (1985), The Texas Chainsaw Massacre 2 (1986), Uncle Buck (1989), Wagons East (1994), Casino (1995) and later, Pirates of the Caribbean: The Curse of the Black Pearl (2003).

Elmore died on June 28, 2025, at the age of 72.
