= Paris, Texas (film) =

1984 film by Wim Wenders

- US theatrical release poster
- Directed by: Wim Wenders
- Written by: Sam Shepard
- Adaptation by: L. M. Kit Carson
- Produced by: Don Guest
- Starring: Harry Dean Stanton; Nastassja Kinski; Dean Stockwell; Aurore Clément; Hunter Carson
- Cinematography: Robby Müller
- Edited by: Peter Przygodda
- Music by: Ry Cooder
- Production companies: Road Movies Filmproduktion GmbH; Argos Films S.A.; Channel Four Films
- Distributed by: Argos Films (France); Tobis Film (West Germany); Palace Pictures (United Kingdom)
- Release dates: 19 May 1984 (Cannes); 19 September 1984 (France); 11 January 1985 (West Germany)
- Running time: 147 minutes
- Countries: West Germany; France; United Kingdom
- Language: English
- Budget: $1.5 million
- Box office: $3.6 million

Paris, Texas is a 1984 drama road film directed by Wim Wenders, co-written by Sam Shepard and L. M. Kit Carson, and produced by Don Guest. A co-production of West Germany, France, and the United Kingdom, it stars Harry Dean Stanton, Nastassja Kinski, Dean Stockwell, Aurore Clément, and Hunter Carson. In the film, Travis Henderson (Stanton) reunites with his brother Walt (Stockwell) and son Hunter (Carson) after an unexplained four-year absence.

At the 1984 Cannes Film Festival, the film won the Palme d'Or from the official jury, as well as the FIPRESCI Prize and the Prize of the Ecumenical Jury. It went on to receive other honors and widespread critical acclaim for its direction, screenplay, acting, cinematography, emotional resonance, and musical score. It has become a cult classic and is widely considered one of the greatest films ever made. It has been called an exemplar of both independent cinema and the road film. In the decennial critics' poll published by the British Film Institute's magazine Sight and Sound in 2022, Paris, Texas placed 185th.

== Plot ==
Travis Henderson is wandering through the West Texas desert holding an empty gallon water jug. He wanders into a convenience store, opens a freezer, starts eating ice, and faints. A doctor examines Travis and believes that he is mute. The doctor goes through Travis's wallet and finds a card with a phone number on it. He calls the number and reaches Walt Henderson, Travis's brother.

Walt travels from Los Angeles to Terlingua, Texas, to pick up Travis, whom he had presumed dead after not hearing from him for four years. Walt's wife, Anne, is worried since she and Walt have adopted Travis's son, Hunter, as Hunter's biological mother, Jane, had been out of his life for years. Walt finds Travis wandering miles down the road from the clinic.

The brothers begin their trip back to Los Angeles. Walt grows increasingly frustrated with Travis's muteness and confronts him about his disappearance and abandonment of Hunter. At the mention of Hunter, Travis begins to cry but still does not speak. The next day, Travis finally begins to speak and produces a photo of a plot of land, explaining that he purchased a property in Paris, Texas.

The brothers arrive in Los Angeles, where Walt and Anne live in the Verdugo Hills overlooking the Burbank Airport. There Travis reunites with Hunter, who has little recollection of him and is initially timid around him. Walt shows Hunter old home videos of them and Jane, and, after persistence by Travis, Hunter grows comfortable around his father. Anne tells Travis in confidence that Jane wires monthly payments from a particular Houston bank into an account set up for Hunter. Anne pays particular attention to Travis, often seeking his attention around the house. Travis becomes determined to find Jane and tells Hunter that he must leave the next night. Hunter tells Travis that he wants to accompany him, though they do not have Walt's or Anne's permission.

Travis and Hunter leave for Houston, and grow closer. They arrive at the bank on the day of the expected deposit and watch for Jane. Hunter spots her making a drive-in deposit, and they follow her car to a peep show club where she works. Travis goes inside while Hunter waits in the pickup truck. The peep show is designed so that customers sit on one side of a one-way mirror with a telephone intercom to the performer. When Jane enters the room, Travis becomes angry and questions her about what her job entails, then apologizes and leaves.

The next day, Travis leaves Hunter in a hotel room (with a tape-recorded explanation) and goes to Jane's workplace. In another peep-show session with her, he turns his chair to face away from the glass. On the phone, he tells her a vague story about a man and a younger woman who met, quickly fell in love with each other, married, and had a child. Jane is initially confused but soon realizes it is Travis. He tells her that after the child was born, the wife became irritable and enraged, and yearned for an escape. She would have dreams about running naked down a highway, but just as she was about to finally leave, he would appear and stop her. The now-alcoholic husband, fearing his wife's departure, tied a cowbell to her foot so he would be able to hear if she left in the night. On one night, the wife—having stuffed socks in the cowbell to muffle the sound—successfully snuck out, but the husband caught her and dragged her back home. He tied her to a stove with his belt and went to bed. When he woke up, the house was on fire, and the wife and child were gone.

Jane turns the light off on her side and finally sees Travis. She expresses pain and regret over missing Hunter's childhood. Travis tells Jane that Hunter is waiting for her in a hotel room and gives her the room number. Jane and Hunter reunite while Travis watches from the parking lot. Travis gets in his pickup and drives away.

== Cast ==
- Harry Dean Stanton as Travis Henderson
- Nastassja Kinski as Jane Henderson, Travis's wife
- Dean Stockwell as Walt Henderson, Travis's brother
- Aurore Clément as Anne Henderson, Walt's wife
- Hunter Carson as Hunter Henderson, Travis's son
- Bernhard Wicki as Doctor Ulmer, a doctor in Texas
- Socorro Valdez as Carmelita, the Hendersons' cleaning woman
- Tom Farrell as the Screaming prophet
- John Lurie as Slater, man at the bar of the Peepshow
- Sally Norvell as 'Nurse Bibs', a peepshow worker

== Production ==
=== Development ===
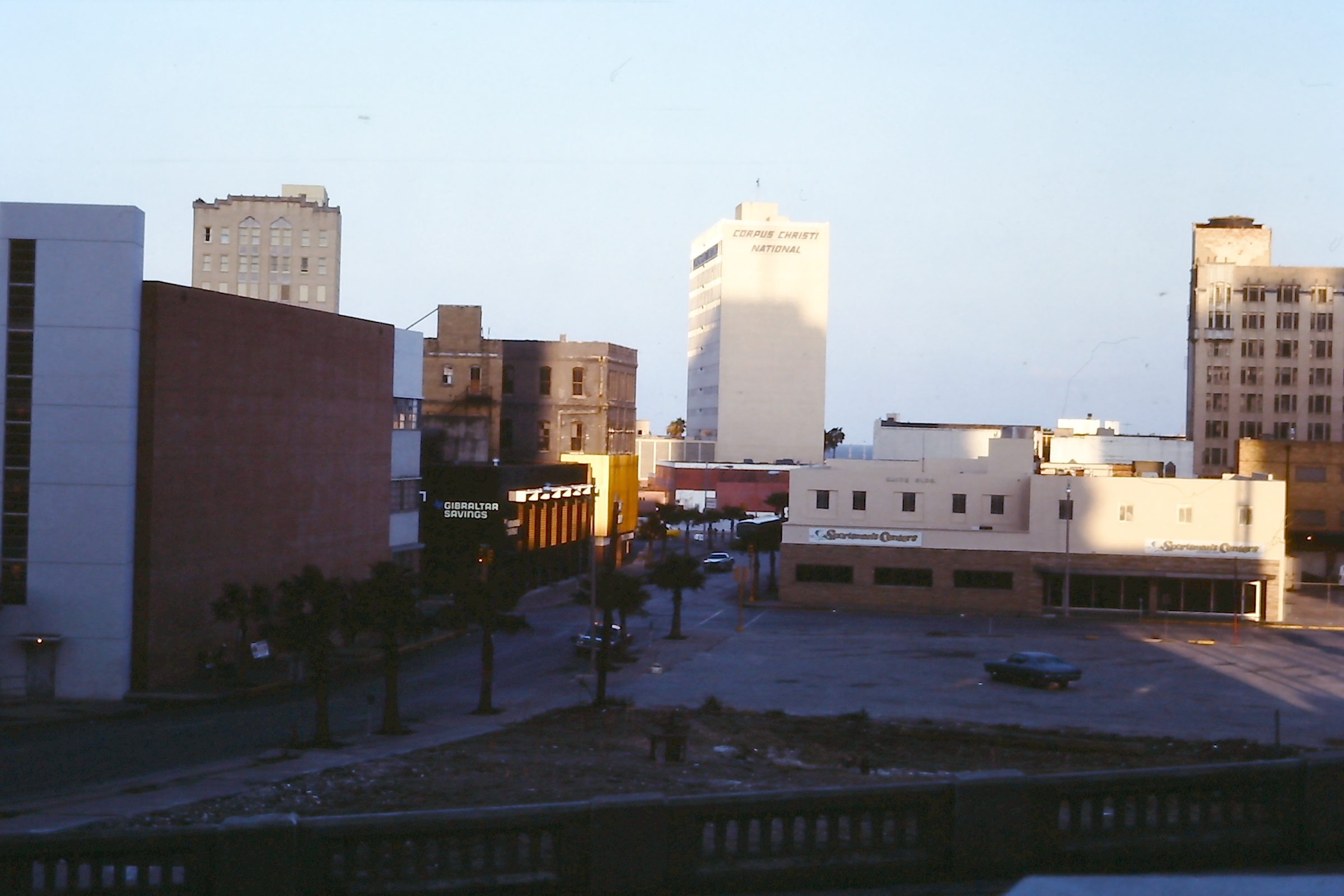
Wenders went location scouting in Corpus Christi, Texas.

West German director Wim Wenders had traveled to the United States and said he wanted "to tell a story about America". The film is named for the Texas city of Paris, but no scene is set there. Paris is where Travis thinks he was conceived and where he owns a vacant lot, seen only in a photograph, on which he intended to build a house and live happily with his family. Wenders had taken photographs like it while location scouting in the Western United States earlier in his career, in places such as Las Vegas and Corpus Christi, Texas.

Screenwriter Sam Shepard met Wenders to discuss writing and/or acting for Wenders's project Hammett. Shepard said he was uninterested in writing Hammett, but they considered loosely adapting Shepard's Motel Chronicles, and developed a story about two brothers, one of whom had lost his memory. Their script grew to 160 pages, the brothers' relationship lessened in importance, and numerous endings were considered. Little of the project's funding came from Germany.

The film has some resemblances to Wenders's 1974 film Alice in the Cities (Alice in den Städten).

=== Casting ===
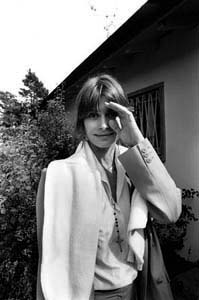
Nastassja Kinski wrote a backstory as a fictional diary for her character.

Harry Dean Stanton had appeared in many films before Paris, Texas, with small roles in Cool Hand Luke and a big part in Repo Man, which was released the same year as Paris, Texas. He embraced the role of Travis, saying, "After all these years, I finally got the part I wanted to play". But Wenders said Stanton was unsure about his part, and about the age disparity between himself and Nastassja Kinski. Wenders said he had discovered Dean Stockwell as he was prepared to quit acting, finding no desirable roles and considering a career in real estate. Hunter Carson was the son of co-screenwriter L. M. Kit Carson, and agreed to act while accompanied by his mother, Karen Black, who helped him memorize the dialogue.

Kinski wrote a diary for the character Jane to develop her backstory, imagining her emigrating from Europe and receiving more affection from Travis than she had from anyone else.

According to Stockwell, in early drafts, Walt traveled with Hunter, Travis, and Anne until Anne turned back to Los Angeles and Walt became lost in the desert, paralleling Travis in the first scene. Stockwell's and Aurore Clément's parts were later reduced.

=== Filming ===
Wenders said the film was shot very quickly, in just over a month, with only a small group working the last weeks. There was a break in shooting during which the script was completed. Filmmaker Allison Anders worked as a production assistant on the film and Claire Denis served as assistant director. Filming largely occurred in Fort Stockton and Marathon in West Texas's Trans-Pecos region. The film marked Wenders's first time avoiding storyboarding completely, going straight to rehearsals on location before shooting.

Shooting began with the screenplay still incomplete, with the objective of filming in the chronological order of the story. Shepard planned to base the rest of the story on the actors' observations and their understanding of the characters. But when he moved on to another project, he sent Wenders notes on how the screenplay should end instead. Shepard credited Wenders and L. M. Kit Carson with the idea of a peep show and the story's final acts. At Wenders's request, Shepard wrote Travis's climactic monologue to Jane, and dictated it over the phone to a secretary working on the film. The filmmakers opted not to portray a realistic peep show, as they needed a format that allowed for more communication between the characters. Kinski could not see anyone, only a mirror, in the peep show scenes, and said this created a genuine feeling of solitude.

Challenges arose when the film ran low on money, but Wenders was encouraged when they completed the scene with Kinski, remarking, "it dawned on me that we were going to touch people in a big way. I was a little scared by the idea".

== Themes and interpretation ==
Robert P. Kolker and Peter Beickene wrote that the film presents the United States as "a fantasyland, a place of striking images, a mise-en-scène of desert and city". Aside from the landscape, there are references to U.S. culture and film and similarities to John Ford's 1956 film The Searchers. Academic Roger Cook argued there is a connection between the character of Travis and his surroundings observable on the ride to California. The character gradually moves from the "desolate" to civilization, and continually tries to derail this difficult transition. His vehicles of choice possibly also reflect his characterization, as his preferred rental car has a bump, and he switches to a clearly used 1959 Ford Ranchero for his return to Texas.

Thomas Elsaesser observed that many of the journeys in Wenders's filmography are in search of a woman. In the case of Paris, Texas, this is with the aim of "escaping her 'now' in order to find her as she was 'then'". Kolker and Beickene commented on the lack of touch, or even "emotional fulfillment", between Travis and Jane at the end, aside from their faces merging in the glass and their discussions of their emotions.

Marc Silberman examined how personal identity is also a theme in the film, as the name "Paris" is deceptive, conjuring images of France but referring to Texas. This is evident in what Travis calls "Daddy's joke" about Travis's mother being from Paris, and his belief that he was conceived there causes him to believe going there will allow him to achieve self-realization. Elsaesser believed Travis sends Hunter in his stead to reunite with Jane. Elsaesser called this an example of a complicated system in which various characters see each other through fantasy and remake each other as they desire. Travis's father had seen his mother as a Parisian, and this became "a sickness".

Cook opined that returning to the sanctuary of the road is Travis's response to having suffered the worst modern American experience, turning his son over to the boy's mother. Stan Jones suggested that the story involves a "European way of seeing", as Travis evolves from a perceiver to a driving force then back to a perceiver before finally withdrawing. Wenders said that the final scene, where Travis leaves Jane and Hunter behind, marked the beginning of the next chapter in his own filmography: "This scene for me had a liberating effect ... I let him disappear in my own way, and all my previous male characters went with him. They have all taken up residence in a retirement home on the outskirts of Paris, Texas."

Paris, Texas is in the road movie genre, but Guardian critic Guy Lodge suggested it could also be considered a Western. Stan Jones noted Mark Luprecht had classified Paris, Texas as a tragedy and had detected Oedipal themes in its depiction of family.

== Style ==
Paris, Texas is notable for its images of the Texas landscape and climate. Wenders emphasized roads in his earlier work, particularly his Road Movie trilogy, to depict "characters' journeys". The setting of Texas removed the cultural boundaries of Europe. The opening gives an aerial perspective of the dry desert. Critic Emanuel Levy noted the shots that follow of "billboards, placards, graffiti, rusty iron carcasses, old railway lines, neon signs, motels". The film's production design is by Kate Altman. Cinematographer Robby Müller had frequently worked with Wenders, and the photography in Paris, Texas is characteristic of Müller's style, which director Steve McQueen called "a visual language to capture what appear to be men falling to their deaths in slow motion". Senses of Cinema critic Lee Hill also compared it to the art of Edward Hopper and Edward Ruscha.

The film is accompanied by a slide-guitar score by Ry Cooder, employing Blind Willie Johnson's "Dark Was the Night, Cold Was the Ground", which Cooder called "the most transcendent piece in all American music". Screen International editor Nick Roddick wrote the music gives "a quality of yearning to the bleakness of the landscape". In 2018, Cooder revealed a specific source of inspiration during an interview on BBC Radio 4: "[Wenders] did a very good job at capturing the ambience out there in the desert, just letting the microphones ... get tones and sound from the desert itself, which I discovered was in the key of E♭ ... that's the wind, it was nice. So we tuned everything to E♭".

== Release and reception ==
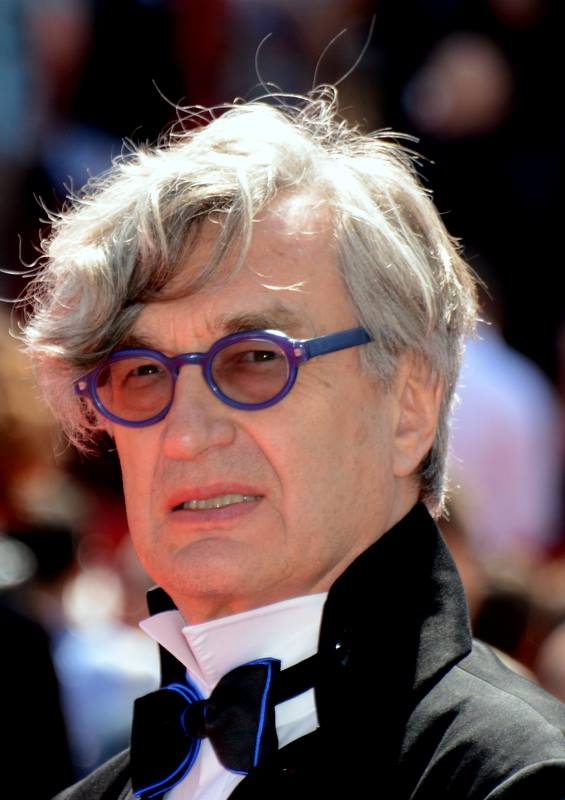
Wim Wenders at the 2014 Cannes Film Festival.

Paris, Texas competed at the 1984 Cannes Film Festival. Wenders said Stanton was so anxious about Cannes that they hired Sean Penn to help him prepare for the screening. Roddick said the film's affectionate portrayal of the U.S. was well received by European filmmakers at Cannes at a time of high anti-Americanism, given the presidency of Ronald Reagan.

Conflicts between Wenders's Road Movies company and distributor Filmverlag over how many copies of Paris, Texas should be released in West Germany after Cannes caused it to be initially denied a theatrical release there, so bus tours were launched to transport German viewers to Zürich for showings. Road Movies sued to sever ties with Filmverlag, and the film reached West German theatres eight months later.

Paris, Texas screened at the Sundance Film Festival in 1985 and again in 2006 as part of the Sundance Collection category. It returned to Cannes for the Cannes Classics section of the 2014 Festival, after being restored by Cinepost. The Criterion Collection has released the film on DVD and Blu-ray in Region 1.

=== Critical response ===
Roger Ebert gave the film four out of four stars, writing: "Paris, Texas is a movie with the kind of passion and willingness to experiment that was more common fifteen years ago than it is now. It has more links with films like Five Easy Pieces and Easy Rider and Midnight Cowboy than with the slick arcade games that are the box-office winners of the 1980s. It is true, deep, and brilliant". Variety's Holly Willis praised the cinematography and credited Wenders for a worthy European portrait of the U.S. Vincent Canby of The New York Times wrote, "The film is wonderful and funny and full of real emotion as it details the means by which Travis and the boy become reconciled. Then it goes flying out the car window when father and son decide to take off for Texas in search of Jane". David Denby criticized Paris, Texas in New York, calling it "lifeless" and a "fiasco". Texas Monthly boasted Paris, Texas was "The hottest Texas town in France", noting Le Monde placed a rave review of the film on its first page. For The Boston Globe, Jay Carr wrote: "Paris, Texas is no landmark film. It has wonderful things in it, but it's also severely flawed", calling Kinski "spectacularly miscast".

It has had an enduring legacy among critics and film aficionados as a cult classic. In 2015, Guy Lodge of The Guardian named it a favorite Palme d'Or-winner, while Texas Monthly included it in its Best Texas Movies list for its depiction of Marathon, Texas. The same year, Paris, Texas appeared on a posthumous list of Akira Kurosawa's 100 favorite movies. In 2016, Entertainment Weekly also included it in The 25 Best Texas Movies, while The Texas Observer critic Michael Agresta said it created "a certain flavor of Texas cool". The same year, The Hollywood Reporter named it the 44th-best Palme d'Or-winner to date. In 2024, IndieWire named the film the 15th-best winner to date.

On the review aggregator website Rotten Tomatoes, Paris, Texas holds an approval rating of 95% based on 58 reviews. The website's critics consensus reads, "A quiet yet deeply moving kind of Western, Paris, Texas captures a place and people like never before (or after)." Metacritic, which uses a weighted average, assigned the film a score of 81 out of 100, based on 13 critics, indicating "universal acclaim".

=== Accolades ===
At Cannes, the film won three prizes: the Palme d'Or, the FIPRESCI Prize, and the Prize of the Ecumenical Jury. The decision from the main jury on the Palme d'Or was unanimous, with one of the members being French cinematographer Henri Alekan, who later worked with Wenders on Wings of Desire.

Award	Date of ceremony	Category	Recipient(s)	Result	Ref.
Bodil Awards	1985	Best European Film	Wim Wenders	Won	
British Academy Film Awards	5 March 1985	Best Film	Chris Sievernich and Anatole Dauman	Nominated	
British Academy Film Awards	5 March 1985	Best Direction	Wim Wenders	Won	
British Academy Film Awards	5 March 1985	Best Adapted Screenplay	Sam Shepard	Nominated	
British Academy Film Awards	5 March 1985	Best Score	Ry Cooder	Nominated	
Cannes Film Festival	11–23 May 1984	Palme d'Or	Wim Wenders	Won	
Cannes Film Festival	11–23 May 1984	FIPRESCI Prize	Wim Wenders	Won	
Cannes Film Festival	11–23 May 1984	Prize of the Ecumenical Jury	Wim Wenders	Won	
César Awards	3 February 1985	Best Foreign Film	Wim Wenders	Nominated	
German Film Award	1985	Best Fiction Film in Silver	Wim Wenders	Won	
Golden Globe Awards	27 January 1985	Best Foreign Film	Wim Wenders	Nominated	
London Film Critics' Circle	1985	Best Film	Wim Wenders	Won	
National Board of Review	17 December 1984	Top Ten Films	Wim Wenders	Won	
Young Artist Awards	15 December 1985	Best Leading Young Actor in a Feature Film	Hunter Carson	Nominated	

== Legacy ==
The rock band U2 cited Paris, Texas as an inspiration for its album The Joshua Tree. The bands Travis and Texas both took their names from the film, as did the hiphop duo Paris Texas. The name of the 2024 album paris paris, texas texas by More Eaze, Glass, and pardo also references the film. Musicians Kurt Cobain and Elliott Smith said it was their favorite film.

The film has influenced later directors, including David Robert Mitchell, who made It Follows (2014), saying the aesthetics in its framing and composition were instructive. According to Wes Anderson, the photographs of the dead wife in The Royal Tenenbaums were inspired by Wenders's home movie scene. Sam Mendes has cited Paris, Texas as a major inspiration, calling it one of his "seminal film moments".

In 1986, the photographs Wenders took on his location scout for Paris, Texas were exhibited at the Centre Pompidou in Paris, France, under the title Written in the West. In 2000, they were published in a book also titled Written in the West, with additional material in Written in the West, Revisited in 2015.
