= The Grass Is Singing =

1950 novel by Doris Lessing

- First UK edition
- Author: Doris Lessing
- Language: English
- Publisher: Michael Joseph (UK); Thomas Y. Crowell Co. (US)
- Publication date: 1950
- Publication place: United Kingdom
- Media type: Print (hardback & paperback)
- Pages: 256
- Followed by: Martha Quest

The Grass Is Singing, published in 1950, is the first novel by the British author Doris Lessing. It takes place in Southern Rhodesia (now Zimbabwe), in southern Africa, during the 1940s and deals with the racial politics between whites and blacks in that country (which was then a British Colony). It follows an emotionally immature woman's hasty marriage to an unsuccessful farmer, and her ensuing mental deterioration, her murder, and the colonial British society's reactions to it. The novel created a sensation when it was first published and became an instant success in Europe and the United States. A Swedish-made adaptation, Gräset Sjunger, was filmed in English in 1981.

== Plot ==
The novel begins with a newspaper clipping about the death of Mary Turner, a white woman, killed by her black servant, Moses. The bulk of the novel is the story of Mary's life.

After a loveless, wretched childhood, Mary is contented with her life as an office worker in a city in Rhodesia. But, after overhearing her friends laugh at her as sexless and immature, she resolves to marry, and when Dick Turner asks her she consents, though she has met him only twice. Dick is also in a hurry to wed, because he is very lonely and unhappy clawing a bare living from a subsistence farm and living in a bare, ugly little house. From the beginning, they are distant and cold, but, except when Mary briefly runs away, fear of loneliness and lack of money keep them together. When Mary becomes involved in the running of the farm, she realizes that its failure is not down to bad luck, as Dick keeps telling her, but his incompetence. This distances her even more from him. Their white neighbors make overtures of friendship, but, out of shame at her poverty, Mary rejects them. The Turners' barren existence is contrasted with the fierce beauty of the land, to which they are oblivious.

The natives, whom Dick employs on the farm, are a further source of tension. Black people have never been part of Mary's world, and she treats them with frigid contempt. They have difficulty keeping a servant until Dick assigns his best field hand, Moses, to the house. What he does not know is that the weal on Moses' face is there because Mary, enraged at what she considered insolence, struck him with a whip. As the farm deteriorates, the three of them are locked into an elaborate dance of intimacy, despair, and, finally, death.

== Title and epigraph ==
The title of the novel is a phrase from T. S. Eliot's The Waste Land, which appears at line 386 of "What the Thunder Said", part V of the poem:

In this decayed hole among the mountains
In the faint moonlight, the grass is singing
Over the tumbled graves, about the chapel
There is the empty chapel, only the wind's home.
It has no windows, and the door swings,
Dry bones can harm no one.

— T. S. Eliot, "V. What the Thunder Said", The Waste Land. (Lines 385–390)

Despite the section's theme of the power of destruction over growth, it is one of the more jubilant and reviving images used in "What the Thunder Said". Fifteen lines from this section of The Waste Land are quoted to begin the novel, forming its epigraph, to which is added the epigrammatic quotation: "It is by the failures and misfits of a civilization that one can best judge its weaknesses", an aphorism from an unstated source.

== Adaptations ==
The book was adapted into a movie in 1981 by a Swedish company. Filmed in Livingstone and other locations of Zambia, the film stars John Thaw, Karen Black and John Kani. It is also known under the titles, Swedish: Gräset Sjunger and Killing Heat.

== Publication history ==
The first American edition was published in 1950 by Thomas Y. Crowell Co. The first American paperback edition was in 1964, from Ballantine Books. The novel was also republished in 1973 in the influential Heinemann African Writers Series.
