= Summer Solstice (2003 film) =

- Directed by: George Fivas
- Written by: Jeffrey Gold; Ian Felding
- Produced by: George Fivas; Kelli Coppens; Jeffrey Gold; Rorie D. van Klaveren; Joe Estevez; John M. Sjogren; Rish Mustaine; Nathan Rollins
- Starring: George Fivas; Joe Estevez; Brook Jenell Slack; Lindsay Pulsipher; Nathan Rollins; Karen Black
- Cinematography: John M. Sjogren
- Edited by: Rorie D. van Klaveren
- Music by: Tim Janis
- Distributed by: Echelon Studios, Singa Home Entertainment (USA, DVD) (Greece, DVD) (China, DVD) (Russia, DVD)
- Release date: 2003
- Running time: 111 mins
- Country: United States
- Language: English

Summer Solstice tells a story set in coastal Maine, a reflective coming-of-age tale starring George Fivas as Joshua Ballard, a brilliant but aimless and misunderstood college student who finds solace in composing music and writing. But when his anguished state of mind leads him to cross paths with contemplative lighthouse keeper Seth Arden (Joe Estevez) and his niece Andrea Bettencourt (Brook Jenell Slack, voiced Jelly Otter in Disney's PB&J Otter from 1998 to 2000), the encounter leads Joshua to transcend a personal crisis through an odyssey of self-discovery, and accept the compassion of his friends, old and new, which ultimately saves his life. Academy Award nominee and Golden Globe winner Karen Black (Five Easy Pieces and The Great Gatsby) plays a stern university professor. Joshua's college friends are played by Lindsay Pulsipher (HBO's True Blood, A&E's The Beast) and Nathan Rollins. The screenplay is based on a story by playwright, composer, physicist, and mathematician Jeffrey Gold. The film features the lighthouse Pemaquid Point Light and surrounding coastal areas and towns of Maine and music by popular Maine native, Tim Janis (known for his numerous specials on the American Public Broadcasting Service). The film was directed by George Fivas, a published scientist and a founder of the jazz and popular music group, Apollo.

== Cast ==
- Joe Estevez as Seth Arden
- Lindsay Pulsipher as Micki
- Karen Black as Dr. Sally McDermott
- Joshua S. Ray as Laureen's other boyfriend
- Gia Pace as Mark's girlfriend
- Tod Huntington as Party guest

== Releases ==
After a limited theatrical release in 2005 (notably, during which time, the film played at the historic Waldo Theatre located in the region featured in the film), Echelon Entertainment released the film on DVD, as of 2010, under the label: Singa Home Entertainment. It was later released by Netflix in 2006. In 2010, it was officially selected for the newly expanding Columbia Gorge International Film Festival held in Vancouver, Washington. Because it was the film's first screening in a film festival, it was considered a world premiere and won the Best World Premiere Excellence in Filmmaking Award.

== Awards ==
Best World Premiere Excellence in Filmmaking Award, Columbia Gorge International Film Festival, Vancouver, Washington, USA, 2010

== Historic crossroads ==
The lighthouse at Pemaquid Point, prominently featured in this film (Pemaquid Point Light), is the lighthouse featured on the Maine State Quarter of 2003, and is a popular U.S. National Historic Landmark among many artists and lighthouse enthusiasts.

== Reviews ==
Critical and public reviews of this film seem to be generally positive, but have ranged across the board, from very negative to very positive to often mostly positive, but mixed. Some reviews have cited production shortfalls from apparent budget limitations and minor storytelling flaws, but have praised the film's sincere portrayals, heartfelt themes, scenic landscapes, and the beauty of Tim Janis' music.
