= Gail Brown =

American actress

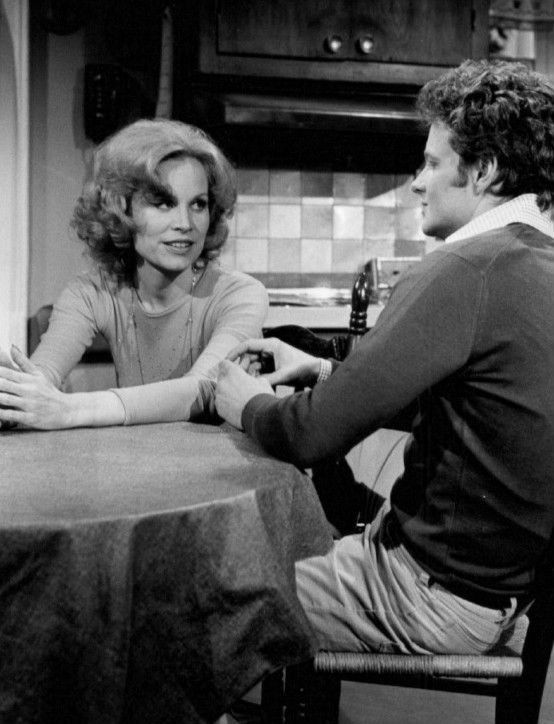
- Brown with William Russ on Another World, 1977.
- Born: Gail Marjorie Ziegler; October 11, 1937 (age 88); Chicago, Illinois, U.S.
- Occupation: Actress
- Years active: 1967–1987
- Known for: Clarice Hobson on Another World
- Spouses: Michael Quinlan Brown (m. 1970; div. 1977) Gordon Duggan (m. 1981)
- Relatives: Karen Black (sister); Hunter Carson (nephew)

Gail Marjorie Brown (née Ziegler; born October 11, 1937) is an American former actress, known for her role as Clarice Hobson on the NBC daytime soap opera Another World (1975–1986).

== Early years ==
Brown was born Gail Marjorie Ziegler and grew up in the Chicago suburb of Park Ridge, Illinois. She is a daughter of Elsie Mary (née Reif), a writer, and Norman Arthur Ziegler, an engineer and businessman. Her younger sister was actress Karen Black. Before she became a professional entertainer, Brown worked as a hatcheck girl, a typist and a waitress.

== Career ==
Brown left home for New York City, planning to become a professional dancer. She became an understudy and dancer in a national touring company of Funny Girl. She also performed as Mimsey and as a showgirl in the Broadway production of that musical.

Brown played the role of Clarice Hobson on the soap opera Another World from 1975 to 1986 with sporadic on-off appearances following her departure. The role was notable for being the first comedic character on a daytime TV soap opera.

== Personal ==
Brown took her professional name from her first husband, Michael Quinlan Brown, an actor and a writer. She was married to him from 1970 to 1977. Since 1981, Brown has been married to Gordon Duggan. They reside in Cold Spring, New York.
