= L. M. Kit Carson =

American actor and screenwriter

- Born: Lewis Minor Carson; August 12, 1941; Irving, Texas, U.S.
- Died: October 20, 2014 (aged 73); Dallas, Texas, U.S.
- Occupations: Actor; screenwriter; director; producer
- Years active: 1967–2014
- Spouses: Karen Black (m. 1975–1983) Cynthia Hargrave (m. 1990)
- Children: Hunter Carson

Lewis Minor "Kit" Carson (August 12, 1941 – October 20, 2014) was an American actor, screenwriter, director and film producer.

== Career ==
Carson first gained the notice of the film world when he starred in Jim McBride's mockumentary David Holzman's Diary in 1967 as the title character, a man so obsessed with filmmaking that he allows his obsession to take over his life and ruin his relationships. The two teamed up again in the early 1980s, sharing screenplay credits for the 1983 remake of Breathless; the film starred Richard Gere and Valérie Kaprisky. Kit Carson's break-out accomplishment was co-writing, with Sam Shepard, the screenplay for the 1984 film Paris, Texas, which featured his son Hunter Carson in his film debut. Kit Carson also penned the screenplay for the 1986 horror satire The Texas Chainsaw Massacre 2.

== Personal life and death ==
Carson had a son, actor Hunter Carson, with his former wife Karen Black, to whom he was married from 1975 until 1983. L. M. Kit Carson died in his sleep of pneumonia on October 20, 2014, in his native Dallas, Texas, aged 73.

== Filmography ==
=== Films ===
- David Holzman's Diary (1967) - actor
- The American Dreamer (with Lawrence Schiller) (1971) - director
- Breathless (1983) - writer
- Paris, Texas (1984) - writer
- The Texas Chainsaw Massacre 2 (1986) - writer
- Running on Empty (1988) - actor
- Hurricane Streets (1997) - actor
- Bullfighter (2000) - writer, producer
- CQ (2001) - actor
- Perfume (2001) - writer, producer

=== Television ===
- Miami Vice - Season 5 Episode 13, "The Cell Within" - actor
