= The American Dreamer =

- Promotional release poster
- Directed by: Lawrence Schiller; L. M. Kit Carson
- Written by: Dennis Hopper; L. M. Kit Carson; Lawrence Schiller
- Produced by: Lawrence Schiller
- Starring: Dennis Hopper
- Cinematography: Chuck Levey; Lawrence Schiller
- Edited by: Lawrence Schiller; Warner E. Leighton
- Production companies: Corda Productions; Kaback Enterprises
- Distributed by: Corda Productions; EYR Programs
- Release date: 1971
- Running time: 81 minutes
- Country: United States
- Language: English

The American Dreamer is a 1971 American documentary film directed by L. M. Kit Carson and Lawrence Schiller. It follows Dennis Hopper at his home and studio during the post-production of the film The Last Movie, which he directed and starred in.

The American Dreamer was never released theatrically, though it was screened at film festivals and on college campuses. The film was thought to be lost for over 30 years, until it was rediscovered, remastered, and released on DVD and Blu-ray in 2016 by Etiquette Pictures.

== Release ==
The American Dreamer was screened at film festivals and on college campuses around the same time as the release of The Last Movie. It did not receive a wide theatrical release.

== Critical reception ==
On the review aggregator website Rotten Tomatoes, the film has an approval rating of 88%, based on eight reviews. In a retrospective assessment, Steven Heller of The Atlantic wrote: "The final cut of The American Dreamer represents a highly-constructed group effort that pushes the limits of documentary." Peter Bradshaw of The Guardian gave the film three out of five stars, writing that the film "tries to be countercultural but the weirdest thing on show is [Hopper's] gun obsession." He concluded that it "has archival value as a study of Hopper and a footnote to the American new wave."

== Home media ==
In 2015, The American Dreamer was restored in 2K and released on DVD and Blu-ray by Etiquette Pictures.
