= Police Story: Confessions of a Lady Cop =

- Genre: Crime; Drama
- Written by: Mark Rodgers
- Directed by: Lee H. Katzin
- Starring: Don Murray; Karen Black; Pat Crowley
- Theme music composer: Richard Markowitz
- Country of origin: United States
- Original language: English

Production
- Executive producer: David Gerber
- Producer: Hugh Benson
- Cinematography: Jack Woolf
- Editor: Donald Douglas
- Running time: 100 minutes
- Production company: Columbia Pictures Television

Original release
- Network: NBC
- Release: April 29, 1980

Police Story: Confessions of a Lady Cop is a 1980 crime TV movie starring Karen Black and Don Murray, and directed by Lee H. Katzin.

== Cast ==
Actor	Role
Don Murray	Sergeant Jack Leland
Karen Black	Officer Evelyn Carter
Pat Crowley	Gloria Leland
Howard Beckler	Police Captain
Eddie Egan	Captain Harrison
Herbert Jefferson Jr.	Saylor
Frank Sinatra Jr.	Carlo
James Whitmore Jr.	Jeff Allen
