= Killing Heat =

- English-language release
- Directed by: Michael Raeburn
- Written by: Doris Lessing; Michael Raeburn
- Based on: The Grass is Singing by Doris Lessing
- Produced by: Mark Forstater; Catharina Stackelberg
- Starring: Karen Black; John Thaw; John Kani; Patrick Mynhardt; John Moulder-Brown; Margaret Heale
- Cinematography: Bille August
- Edited by: Thomas Schwalm
- Music by: Lasse Dahlberg; Björn Isfält
- Distributed by: Chibote; Swedish Film Institute
- Release date: 2 September 1982 (Australia)
- Running time: 105 minutes
- Countries: Sweden; Australia; Zambia
- Language: English

Killing Heat (released in Sweden as Gräset sjunger) is a 1981 film based on Doris Lessing's 1950 novel The Grass Is Singing. It stars Karen Black and John Thaw and was filmed in Zambia and Sweden. The film was released in Zimbabwe as The Grass is Singing.

== Plot ==
The film takes place in an unidentified nation in southern Africa in the early 1960s (implied strongly to be either South Africa or Southern Rhodesia). Mary, a city woman from Livingstone in Northern Rhodesia, marries a farmer named Dick Turner. Mary leaves the comfortable familiarity of her urban life and goes to live on Dick's struggling farm. Mary has little experience handling black Africans as servants or employees and is harsh and tactless in her treatment of them. Mary, who is deeply unhappy with her new life, eventually runs away from Dick and journeys back to Livingstone, only to find that she cannot get her old job back. This forces her to accept the realization she has nowhere to take permanent refuge and no means of financial support. She returns to the farm. Mary slowly becomes insane and begins an affair with a domestic servant, Moses. After the affair is discovered by Dick's new farm manager, Dick decides to separate from Mary and send her away. Learning of Mary's forthcoming departure, Moses murders Mary during a rainstorm. Moses is arrested by the police and led off in handcuffs.

== Cast ==
- Karen Black as Mary Turner
- John Thaw as Dick Turner
- John Kani as Moses
- Patrick Mynhardt as Charlie Muller
- John Moulder-Brown as Tony Marston
- Margaret Heale as Ellen Muller
