= Crime and Passion =

- Directed by: Ivan Passer
- Written by: Alan R. Trustman; David M. Wolf; Ivan Passer
- Based on: An Ace Up My Sleeve by James Hadley Chase
- Produced by: Robert L. Abrams
- Starring: Omar Sharif; Joseph Bottoms; Karen Black
- Cinematography: Dennis C. Lewiston
- Edited by: Bernard Gribble; John Jympson
- Music by: Vangelis
- Distributed by: American International Pictures (US)
- Release dates: August 1975 (Telluride Film Festival); April 21, 1976 (New York City)
- Running time: 99 minutes
- Country: West Germany
- Language: English

Crime and Passion, also known as Ace Up My Sleeve, is a 1975 comedy drama film.

In the film, a broker convinces his own girlfriend to marry the biggest client of their firm, and to convince her new husband to entrust his entire fortune to him. The plan apparently backfires, when the broker is first framed for embezzlement and then targeted for murder. Meanwhile, the new bride learns that her husband has a Bluebeard-like habit of ending all his marriages through uxoricide.

== Plot ==
André Ferren learns from his girlfriend and co-worker Susan Winters that the biggest client of his brokerage firm, Hermann Rolf, not only wants to replace André with Susan, but asked Susan on a date. André orders Susan to go on the date and Rolf asks Susan to marry him. Susan agrees on the condition that Rolf entrust his fortune to André as a gift. Weeks later, Rolf and Susan are married at Rolf's castle in the Swiss Alps. André assures Susan that he will create a financial scandal that will ruin Rolf and she can divorce him.

André is then accused by the top executives at the brokerage firm of stealing $2.5 million from Rolf's account. He is given ten days to return the money or go to prison. André drives to a ski resort where Susan is having an affair with Larry, a ski instructor. André explains to Susan that he is being framed. A skier attempts to murder André with a ski pole, but André falls and the other skier dies instead. That night, Susan informs André that they cannot be seen together or Rolf will divorce her, and explains that Rolf murdered all his ex-wives.

André survives several more attempts on his life as he follows Susan and Larry to Rolf's castle, including an episode at a village inn where a woman attempts to strangle him. Eventually André sneaks into the castle, where he is imprisoned by a sword-wielding Larry. Susan asks Larry to drive her Maserati Indy to Switzerland and deliver a letter to a banker. In the process of doing so, he passes Rolf's Rolls-Royce Silver Cloud, and Rolf's manservant Henkel shoots, causing the Maserati to explode.

Susan shoots a man in a suit of armor attempting to stab André through the cell bars; lifting the visor reveals the face of the innkeeper. Susan then begins noticing hidden surveillance cameras throughout the castle as Rolf sends Henkel on foot to kill André. Susan tells Rolf through one of the cameras that her feelings have changed. She then tells André to make love to her and smashes the camera, bringing a tear to Rolf's eye as he watches surveillance footage from inside the Rolls-Royce. Henkel locks the castle gates and hides in a mortar, but is shot out of it when Susan pulls the lanyard. Rolf gets drunk, falls down a ravine and walks through the snow.

The next morning, Susan and André lie in bed and realize that Rolf had set them both up in a scheme to murder them. Meanwhile, Rolf has frozen to death standing up.

== Cast ==
- Omar Sharif as André Ferren
- Karen Black as Susan Winters
- Joseph Bottoms as Larry
- Bernhard Wicki as Hermann Rolf
- Heinz Ehrenfreund as Henkel
- Elma Karlowa as Masseuse
- Volker Prechtel as Gastwirt
- Erich Padalewski as Autoverkäufer
- Robert L. Abrams as Mr. Blatt
- Franz Muxeneder as Priester
- Margarete Soper as Sylvia

== Reception ==
Roger Ebert of the Chicago Sun-Times gave the film two stars out of four and called it "not only one of the silliest films ever made but one of the most inexplicable." Vincent Canby of The New York Times called it "a grossly disoriented and disorienting shaggy-dog of a movie that seems to have no point, and no point of view, whatever ... What it's meant to be, I cannot tell. A comedy, melodrama, spoof?" Gene Siskel of the Chicago Tribune gave the film 1.5 stars out of 4 and called it a "European quickie production" with "an absurd script." Arthur D. Murphy of Variety called it "a vulgar little embarrassment" made up of "the untidy combination of self-conscious comedy relief, serious melodrama and indecisive planning that used to be called 'camp' a few years ago ... intercut with sequences of embarrassing non-eroticism made even worse by sophomoric treatment."
