= George Fivas =

American film producer

- Born: George Peter Fivas, II; May 25, 1973 (age 53); Murray, Utah, United States
- Occupations: Film producer; music producer; director; actor; scientist
- Website: https://www.facebook.com/georgefivas/

George Peter Fivas II (born May 25, 1973) is an American film producer, music producer, director and actor based in Los Angeles. He is one of the founding organizers of the jazz and popular music group, Apollo RSVP. His directorial debut came in the form of Summer Solstice (2003), an independently produced coming-of-age drama, released on Netflix in 2006. He directed a music video for the song A New World (2008) by The JMD Project, a hit dance track in Europe, whose video has been broadcast on MTV Germany and other European outlets as an introduction to the Metropolis Revived concert series.

Fivas is also a published scientist, having co-authored several papers on seismological phenomena in the Intermountain Region of The United States.
