= Karen Black =

American actress, screenwriter, and singer-songwriter (1939–2013)

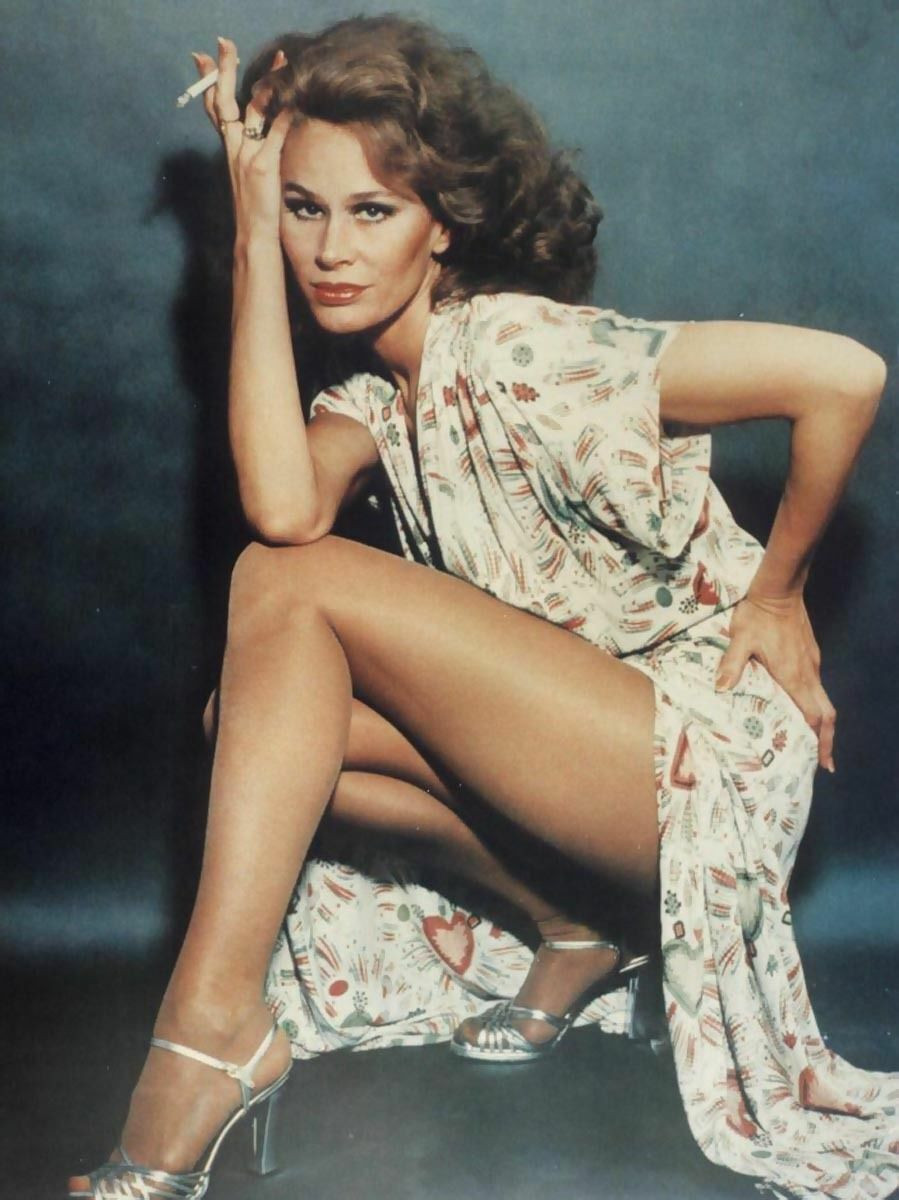
- Black in 1977
- Born: Karen Blanche Ziegler; July 1, 1939; Park Ridge, Illinois, U.S.
- Died: August 8, 2013 (aged 74); Los Angeles, California, U.S.
- Resting place: Eternal Hills Memorial Park, Oceanside, California, U.S.
- Occupations: Actress; screenwriter; singer; composer
- Years active: 1960–2013
- Works: Filmography
- Spouse(s): Charles Black (divorced) (Note: The timeline is hazy as Black neglected to acknowledge this marriage in press interviews. She is pictured as a high school sophomore in the 1955 yearbooks of two different institutions, Maine East High School in Park Ridge, Illinois, and Jefferson High School in Lafayette, Indiana. In the Main East yearbook she is listed as Karen Ziegler. However, in the Jefferson yearbook, she is listed as K. Black, indicating the marriage occurred sometime during the 1954-1955 school year, during which she transferred schools. Multiple sources relay that Black married at age 15, but do not provide an exact date.) Robert Burton (m. 1973; div. 1975) L. M. Kit Carson (m. 1975; div. 1983) Stephen Eckelberry (m. 1987)
- Children: 3, including Hunter Carson
- Relatives: Gail Brown (sister)
- Awards: Full list

Karen Blanche Black (née Ziegler; July 1, 1939 – August 8, 2013) was an American actress, screenwriter, singer, and songwriter. She rose to prominence for her work in studio and independent films in the 1970s, frequently portraying eccentric and offbeat characters, and established herself as a figure of New Hollywood. Her career spanned 50 years and includes nearly 200 credits in both independent and mainstream films. Black received numerous accolades throughout her career, including two Golden Globe Awards, as well as an Academy Award nomination for Best Supporting Actress.

A native of suburban Chicago, Black studied theater at Northwestern University before dropping out and relocating to New York City. She performed on Broadway in 1965 before making her major film debut in Francis Ford Coppola's You're a Big Boy Now (1966). Black relocated to California and was cast as an LSD-tripping prostitute in Dennis Hopper's road film Easy Rider (1969). That led to a co-starring role in the drama Five Easy Pieces (1970), in which she played a hopeless waitress, for which she was nominated for an Academy Award and won a Golden Globe for Best Supporting Actress. Black made her first major commercial picture with the disaster film Airport 1975 (1974), and her subsequent appearance as Myrtle Wilson in The Great Gatsby (1974) won her a second Golden Globe for Best Supporting Actress.

Black played a glamorous country singer in Robert Altman's ensemble musical drama Nashville (1975), also writing and performing two songs for the soundtrack, for which she received a nomination for a Grammy Award. Her portrayal of an aspiring actress in John Schlesinger's drama The Day of the Locust (also 1975) earned her a third Golden Globe nomination, this time for Best Actress. Black subsequently took on four roles in Dan Curtis' anthology horror film Trilogy of Terror (1975), followed by Curtis' supernatural horror feature, Burnt Offerings (1976). The same year, she played a kidnapping accomplice in Alfred Hitchcock's final film, Family Plot.

In 1982, Black played a transgender character in Robert Altman's Broadway production of Come Back to the 5 & Dime, Jimmy Dean, Jimmy Dean, a role she reprised in Altman's subsequent film adaptation. She next starred in the comedy Can She Bake a Cherry Pie? (1983), followed by Tobe Hooper's remake of Invaders from Mars (1986). For much of the 1990s and 2000s, Black starred in a variety of arthouse, independent, and horror films, as well as writing her own screenplays. She had a leading role as a villainous mother in Rob Zombie's House of 1000 Corpses (2003), which cemented her status as a cult horror icon. Black continued to star in low-profile films throughout the early 2010s, as well as working as a playwright before her death from ampullary cancer in 2013.

== Early life ==
Black was born Karen Blanche Ziegler on July 1, 1939, in Park Ridge, Illinois, the third child of Elsie Mary (née Reif), a writer of several prize-winning children's novels, and Norman Arthur Ziegler, an engineer and businessman. Her paternal grandfather was Arthur Charles Ziegler, a classical musician and first violinist for the Chicago Symphony Orchestra. She had a brother and a sister, Gail Brown. Black was of German, Czech, and Norwegian descent. The Zieglers came to the United States from Neukirch, Württemberg, Germany.

Black and her siblings were raised at 224 N. Greenwood Ave. in Park Ridge, and often spent time on her uncle's farm near Green Bay, Wisconsin. As a young teenager, she aspired to have a career as a stage actress, seeking out summer stock theater job opportunities. "From the age of 13 I'd rush out during vacations to find work in summer stock," Black recalled. "I started by cleaning toilets and by the time I was 16 I was a prop-girl and in the chorus line singing, and at 17 I got my first real acting, paid job."

Black attended Maine East High School for her freshman year and part of her sophomore year. She resumed her education at Jefferson High School in Lafayette, Indiana and attended Purdue University for one year, then transferred to Northwestern University, where she majored in theatre arts, studying under Alvina Krause. Black completed two years of studies at NU before dropping out. She later reflected on her training unfavorably, stating:

I would say that the college training was very lousy, and I don't think that people learn by being invalidated... Acting teachers, not all of them but many, seem to think that beating up their students and invalidating them will make them better, which I think is completely wrong. And at that age, you don't realize that this sick person is really projecting all their neurosis onto you, you think that you're the one who's damaged... Alvina Krause would not validate and would not allow. I think she had favorites, and you could never figure out why you weren't a favorite, and it never made any sense. The thing you have to remember is that if a person is making you feel bad about yourself, that person is going to be in his or her own world. They are lost in their own universe.

== Career ==
=== 1960–1970: Stage and film beginnings ===
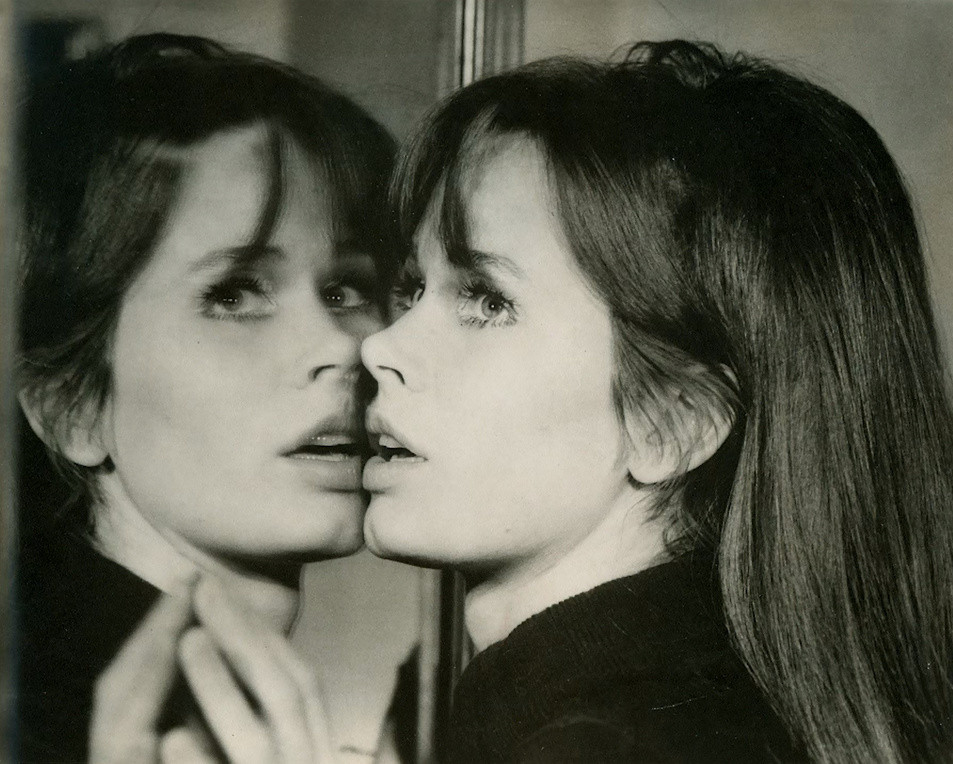
Posing by a mirror, circa 1966

In 1960, Black moved to New York City to pursue an acting career, residing in a cold water flat in Manhattan. She took odd jobs working as a secretary, a front desk person at a hotel, and at an insurance office, and lived on "thirty dollars a week." Black initially began performing with the Rockefeller Players, a theater troupe in Westwood, New Jersey. She briefly joined at the Actors Studio, but left shortly after enrolling, later commenting: "How can a man who isn't an actor teach you how to act?"

Black made her screen debut with a minor role in the independent film The Prime Time (1960), which she would later deem "the worst film ever made." Disillusioned by this foray into film, Black returned to work in theater. She worked as an understudy in the Broadway production of Take Her, She's Mine in December 1961 under director George Abbott. She made her formal Broadway debut in 1965's The Playroom, which received favorable reviews and for which she was nominated for a New York Drama Critics' Circle Award for Best Actress.

In 1966, she appeared with José Ferrer in a stage production of After the Fall at the Coconut Grove Playhouse in Miami, earning an Angel award for best supporting actress. Black returned to film with a leading role in the comedy You're a Big Boy Now (1966), directed by Francis Ford Coppola, portraying the love interest of a young male student. The film earned Black favorable reviews, and the experience prompted her to relocate to Los Angeles. Beginning in 1967, she appeared in guest roles in several television series, including The F.B.I., Run for Your Life, The Big Valley, Mannix and Adam-12.

Her feature film career expanded in 1969, playing the role of an acid-tripping prostitute opposite Dennis Hopper and Peter Fonda in the counterculture film Easy Rider; the first choice for the role was Lana Wood, who had turned it down. Black's sequence in the film was cut from 16 hours of footage. The following year, Black appeared as Rayette, the waitress girlfriend of Jack Nicholson, in the film Five Easy Pieces (1970), for which she was nominated for an Academy Award for Best Supporting Actress, and earned her first Golden Globe Award for Best Supporting Actress. She also won a New York Film Critics Circle Award for Best Supporting Actress for her performance in the film.

=== 1971–1979: Hollywood breakthrough and heyday ===
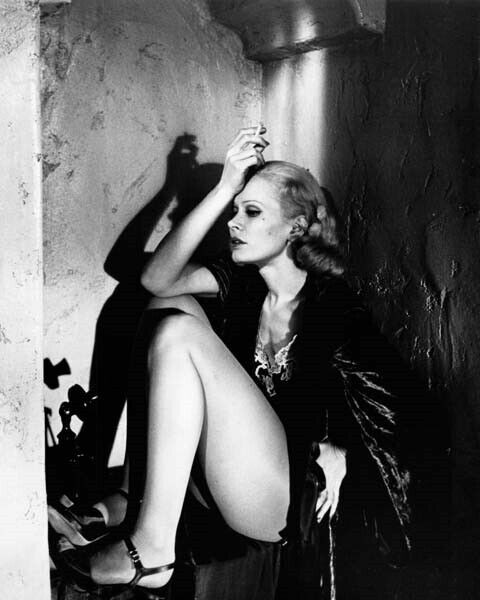
In The Day of the Locust (1975)

Black had a supporting role as the girlfriend of a heroin addict in Born to Win (1971) opposite George Segal and Robert De Niro, followed by a role in Jack Nicholson's directorial debut, Drive, He Said, as a promiscuous faculty wife; and the Western A Gunfight, opposite Kirk Douglas and Johnny Cash, in which she portrayed a saloon barmaid. Black followed these roles with a part in Cisco Pike (1972) opposite Kris Kristofferson and Gene Hackman, and subsequently played a foul-mouthed fashion model in Portnoy's Complaint (1972). She had a lead role opposite Christopher Plummer in the Canadian-produced horror film The Pyx (1973), playing a prostitute embroiled in a series of occult murders, and later appeared in The Outfit (1973) with Robert Duvall. Black had the titular role of Laura in the crime film Little Laura and Big John (1973), playing a runaway moll of the Ashley gang, a film which "aped" the success of Bonnie and Clyde (1967). Shortly after, she appeared in the comedy Rhinoceros (1974) with Gene Wilder.

Black's first major commercial film was the disaster feature Airport 1975 (1974), in which she played Nancy Pryor, a stewardess forced to fly a plane after a midair collision. She subsequently portrayed an unfaithful wife, Myrtle Wilson, in the 1974 version of The Great Gatsby, a performance that earned her a second Golden Globe Award in the same category. In 1975, she played multiple roles in Dan Curtis' televised anthology film Trilogy of Terror: the segments, all written by Richard Matheson, were named after the women involved in the plot — a plain college professor seemingly seduced by a handsome cad of a student ("Julie"), a pair of sisters who squabble over their father's inheritance ("Millicent and Therese"), and the unknowing owner of a cursed Zuni fetish that comes to life and pursues her relentlessly ("Amelia"). The movie was widely praised and has an enduring legacy. It has been praised as a "must watch for horror fans".

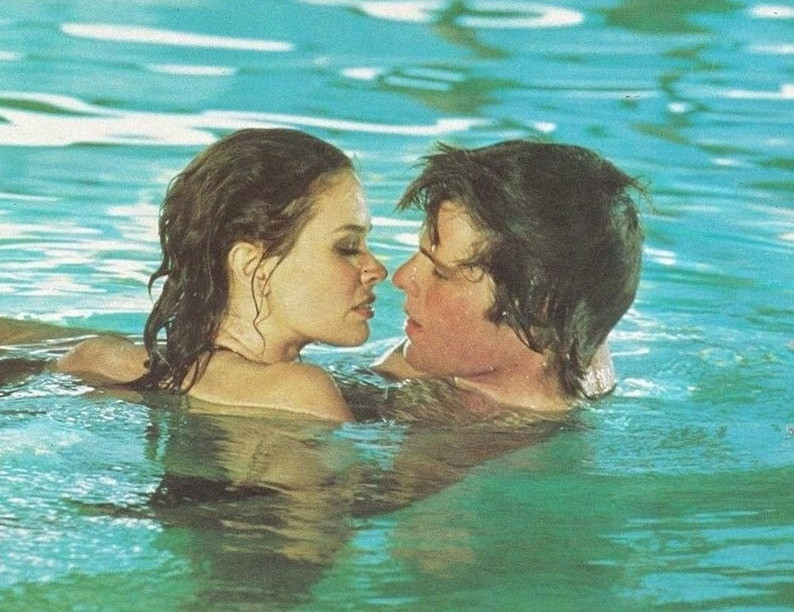
With Joseph Bottoms in Crime and Passion (1976)

Black received her third Golden Globe nomination for Best Actress for her role as an aspiring starlet in 1930s Hollywood in John Schlesinger's tragic drama The Day of the Locust (1975). Though the film earned her critical notice, Black recalled the production being profoundly troubled and possibly hindering her career:

That was not a fun experience, making that film. It was just horrible. I wish quite heartily I'd never made it, because I'd have had a much longer career in Hollywood... It was a very troubled production, and I became the scapegoat that everyone blamed. People kept getting sick, getting fired, and it was just a horror, an absolute horror. Seven months. There were all these rumors that people made up…and I wound up being the center of it. Poor [William] Atherton walked off and didn't do the final scene, because he couldn't take it anymore.

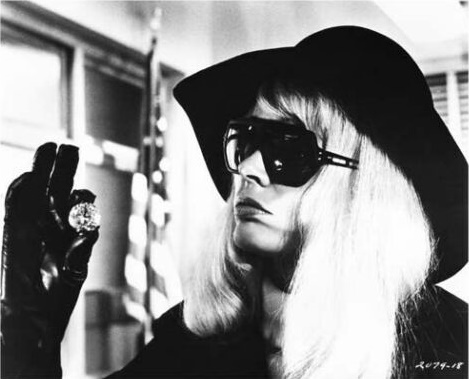
As Fran in Family Plot (1976)

The same year, she starred as a glamorous country singer in Robert Altman's ensemble film Nashville. In addition to acting in the film, Black also wrote and performed two songs for the soundtrack, which was nominated for a Grammy Award for Best Score Soundtrack.

In 1976, Black appeared as a femme fatale jewel thief in Alfred Hitchcock's final film, Family Plot. The film received mixed reviews, though Roger Ebert commented that Black "does a good job in a role that doesn't give her much to do." She also reunited with director Dan Curtis to star opposite Oliver Reed and Bette Davis in the supernatural horror film Burnt Offerings, playing the wife of a family living in a haunted house. Released in the fall of 1976, Burnt Offerings was deemed in The New York Times as an "outstanding terror movie" with "solid actors." Additionally, she had a lead role in the independent crime comedy Crime and Passion (1976), co-starring with Omar Sharif. Due to scheduling conflicts with Family Plot, Black turned down Valerie Perrine's role in W.C. Fields and Me (1976).

In September 1976, Black traveled to Toronto to be a guest star on the variety program The Bobby Vinton Show, which aired across the United States and Canada. Black sang "Lonely Now", and joined Bobby in a medley of country oldies. She played a dual role in the 1977 made-for-television thriller, The Strange Possession of Mrs. Oliver, followed by a minor role in Capricorn One (1978) opposite Elliott Gould. In 1979, Black appeared in the erotic drama In Praise of Older Women, which she regretted because she thought its title aged her.

=== 1980–1985: Career comedown ===
In 1980, Black starred in a made-for-TV movie Police Story: Confessions of a Lady Cop. She subsequently starred in the drama Killing Heat (1981), based on Doris Lessing's 1950 novel The Grass Is Singing, which focused on race relations in South Africa in the 1960s; in the film, Black portrayed an urban woman who relocates to a rural farm with her husband. She also appeared as Émilienne d'Alençon in the French film Chanel Solitaire (1981), a biographical feature detailing the early life of Coco Chanel.

In 1982, Black starred opposite Cher and Sandy Dennis in the Broadway production of Come Back to the Five and Dime, Jimmy Dean, Jimmy Dean directed by Robert Altman. She subsequently co-starred with Cher and Dennis in Altman's film adaptation, also released in 1982. In both renditions, she portrayed the role of Joanne, a trans woman in a small Texas town. Black spent months preparing for the role, and "did research into pretty depressing statistics about people who've become transsexuals and how they still don't feel complete. I had to become a man, and I am not a man... And that transition was so painful to me, to become a man, that I could use the pain of my actual transition for Joanne." While the Broadway production garnered Black some unfavorable reviews, Gary Arnold of The Washington Post praised Black's performance in the film, writing that "watching her in the movie, you can understand that what she's doing as Joanna [sic] might depend on the intimacy of the camera to be both witty and credible."

Black next starred in the comedy directed by Henry Jaglom, Can She Bake a Cherry Pie? (1983), playing a divorcee who becomes involved with a bachelor, followed by a lead in the teen-themed black comedy Bad Manners (1984). She also appeared in television during this period, with a guest-starring role as Sheila Sheinfeld on E/R between 1984 and 1985. She starred in several feature films in 1985, including the Italian exploitation horror film Cut and Run, directed by Ruggero Deodato; the Canadian supernatural horror film The Blue Man; and the action film Savage Dawn, co-starring with Lance Henriksen as a kidnappee.

=== 1986–2002: Independent films and horror roles ===
In 1986, Black co-starred with her son, Hunter, in Tobe Hooper's science fiction horror film Invaders from Mars. She had a supporting role as a mutant's mother in Larry Cohen's horror sequel It's Alive III: Island of the Alive (1987), and in the youth-themed comedy The Invisible Kid (1988). She co-starred with Jim Belushi and Whoopi Goldberg in Homer and Eddie (1989), a comedy about a woman (Goldberg) with a psychologically-impairing brain tumor, and a mentally-challenged man (Belushi). In 1990, Black had a supporting role in The Children (1990), a British adaptation of a novel by Edith Wharton, opposite Ben Kingsley; and in the science fiction comedy Zapped Again!.

Beginning in the 1990s, Black was more frequently cast in horror films. Among them were Mirror, Mirror (1990), in which she played a troubled mother; Gary Graver's low-budget supernatural film Evil Spirits (1990); and Children of the Night (1991), in which she played an ancient vampire. She also had roles in the British comedy Rubin and Ed (1991), the martial arts film The Roller Blade Seven (also 1991), and a cameo in Robert Altman's The Player (1992). Black reprised her role from The Roller Blade Seven in its 1992 and 1993 sequels, and appeared in the direct-to-video comedy The Double 0 Kid (1993), with Corey Haim and Nicole Eggert. Also in 1993, Black had a supporting role in George Sluizer's drama Dark Blood opposite River Phoenix and Judy Davis, a film that remained incomplete and unreleased for two decades after Phoenix died during the production. In 1995, she starred in Plan 10 from Outer Space, a science fiction satire of Mormon theology, directed by Trent Harris.

In 1996, Black appeared as a paranoid mother in small-town Nebraska in Children of the Corn IV: The Gathering, opposite Naomi Watts. She had supporting roles in a number of other independent films that year, including as a public defender in Ulli Lommel's drama Every Minute Is Goodbye, and the exploitation comedy Dinosaur Valley Girls. The following year, she co-starred with Tilda Swinton as Lady Byron in the feminist science fiction feature Conceiving Ada (1997), about a contemporary scientist who uses software to make contact with the Victorian pioneer of computer programming Ada Lovelace, daughter of the poet Lord Byron. She also had supporting roles in the independent drama Men, and as a singer in rural Missouri in George Hickenlooper's Dogtown.

She continued to star in independent films in 1998, including the camp comedy I Woke Up Early the Day I Died, the drama Charades, as well as the short film Waiting for Dr. MacGuffin. In 2000, Black began filming Rob Zombie's directorial debut House of 1000 Corpses, in which she portrayed Mother Firefly, the matron of a family of psychotic murderers. Upon its release in 2003, the film received largely unfavorable reviews, though it helped cement Black's status as a cult icon in the horror genre.

=== 2003–2013: Establishment as cult figure; playwriting and later works ===
As her later career progressed, Black gained a cult following, as alluded to by Family Guy character Tom Tucker in his remark, "Karen Black: what an obscure reference." in the episode Death Is a Bitch (season 2, episode 6). She co-starred with Natasha Lyonne in America Brown (2004), which won the Golden Zenith Award for Best Picture at the Montreal World Film Festival. In 2005, Black received the Best Actress Award at the Fantasporto International Film Festival in Porto, Portugal, for her work in the critically acclaimed Steve Balderson film Firecracker (2005), in which she played two roles, Sandra and Eleanor.

Black launched a career as a playwright in May 2007 with the opening of Missouri Waltz at the Blank Theater in Los Angeles; Black starred in the play as well. She also performed live narrations of Guy Maddin's experimental film Brand Upon the Brain! in 2007, touring the show around the United States.

In 2009, Black worked with director Steve Balderson for Stuck!, an homage to film noir women-in-prison dramas, which co-starred Mink Stole, Pleasant Gehman and Jane Wiedlin. She also reunited with director Henry Jaglom to star in his 2009 film Irene in Time. She starred in John Landis' 2010 thriller Some Guy Who Kills People, as well as Aïda Ruilova's surrealist short film Meet the Eye (2009). Later that year, Black appeared on Cass McCombs' song "Dreams-Come-True-Girl" from the album Catacombs.

The experimental hip-hop group Death Grips released a video on YouTube called "Bottomless Pit" in October 2015. The video shows footage of Black reciting lines from a film script written by the group's drummer/co-producer Zach Hill. The footage was shot in early 2013.

== Image and acting style ==
"I remember a friend of mine who said once, when you're raised in a congested space, you can get kind of intellectual. A little paper-loving, a little essayist. That's not very good for actors. Actors don't think. Thinking isn't good for acting; it's not what you do at all."

— Black on acting, 2008

Due to her work in various independent and mainstream films in the 1970s, Black is considered by film historians as a prominent figure of New Hollywood, and was described in 2004 by Howard Feinstein in the LGBT magazine The Advocate as "Hollywood's off-center icon." She was prolific throughout her career, sometimes appearing in as many as seven films a year, and favored working in independent films: "That's my world—independent features," she stated in 2007. "That's how I started. That's what I like. It's playful and comfortable and not stressful, and it's an individual's way of creating. You're not in the studio system imitating other people and yourself. I'm having a good life."

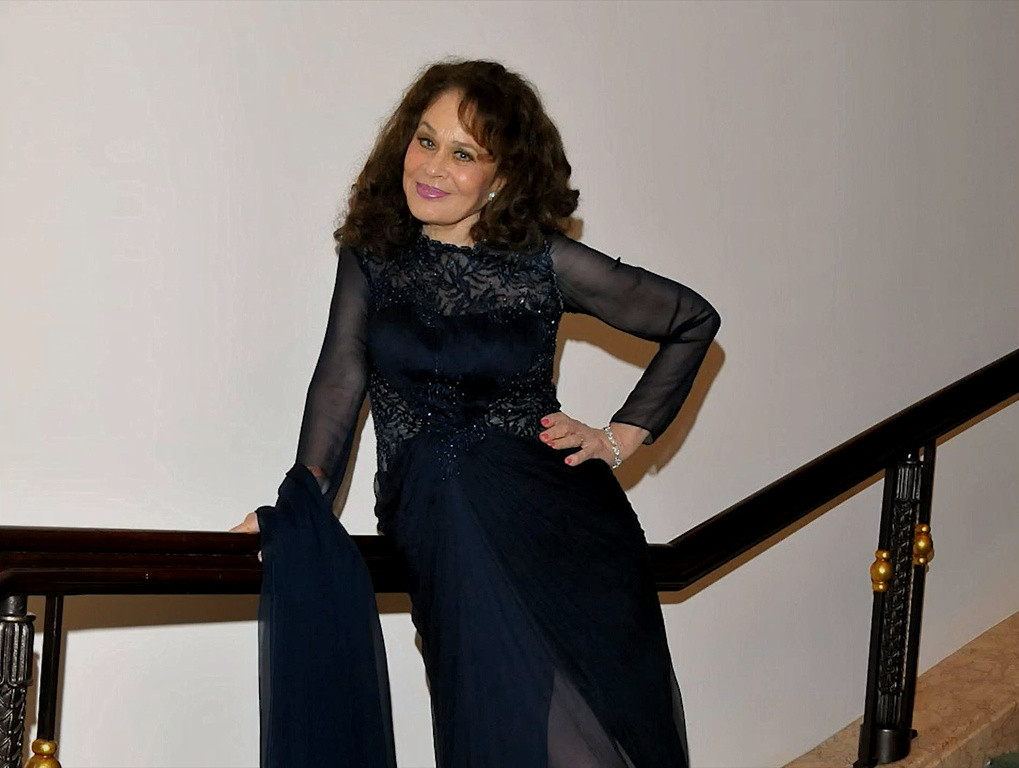
Black in 2010

In her later life, Black spoke unfavorably of the formal study of acting, and commented that she found her training both in the university (under Alvina Krause) and at the Actors Studio unhelpful and oppressive. Also a writer, Black likened her acting process to that of writing screenplays or other literature: "Everything that occurs in this zone is imagination-based. In that sense you mock up a life, and then you become the effect of what you've mocked up, so it's cause and effect. So the more you can mock it up so that it seems real to you, the more you can react to the effect. That's what acting is, and that's what writing involves for me, too. That's the simplicity of it. It sounds simple, because it is." Black considered herself a character actress.

Throughout her career, Black was noted for her distinctive eyes, which gave her a slightly "cross-eyed" appearance, although she stated in a 1982 interview that she had not been clinically diagnosed as such. One reviewer once described her as a "lopsided caricature of a pretty face." For much of her career, Black was typecast as an unglamorous or lowly woman of limited intelligence. Beginning in the 1990s, Black began garnering a cult following for her appearances in horror films, though she clarified in 2008 that she had acted only in "about 14" out of her wide-ranging filmography. "When I did Trilogy of Terror, with that [demon] doll, I filled the role very well," she recalled. "It was very real to people, and they just fell in love with it. And that got to be incredibly popular. With my last name being Black ... so it got to be kind of an unconscious thing, [my association with horror movies]. But I'm not interested in blood."

== Beliefs ==
In 1964, Black became a Scientologist, and practiced it for the remainder of her life. She was a vocal proponent of gay rights, commenting in 2007: "I'm for gay rights. Who you are is very sacred, and should be honored—no matter what gender you were born. You shouldn't feel like you have to dodge some sort of conformity." Black also advocated animal rights and was critical of the fur industry, once posing in a Halloween-themed anti-fur advertisement for People for the Ethical Treatment of Animals (PETA).

== Personal life ==
Black was married four times and called off two engagements. Three of her marriages ended in divorce, while the fourth lasted almost 30 years, ending only at death.

She became pregnant the first time she had sex, with her boyfriend Charles Black. He was 18; she was 15. They were driven to Alabama where they could marry with parental consent, then moved to Muncie, Indiana, where Charles attended college. Black had a miscarriage, to her relief, but when she came home, her father barred her from returning, so she drove back to Muncie. The marriage was short-lived, although she retained Charles' surname, under which she would come to be credited throughout her career.

While a student at Northwestern University, Black began dating classmate Robert Benedetti. She got pregnant again and gave birth to a daughter on March 4, 1959. She did not tell her parents about the pregnancy and put the baby up for adoption at birth; she reconnected with her in 2012.

Boyfriends during the 1960s included writer Henry Jaglom and actors Peter Kastner and Paul Sorvino. From 1971 to 1972, Black was engaged to music manager Peter Rachtman. Rachtman's daughter Karyn would remain a lifelong friend, delivering a eulogy at Black's memorial service.

On April 17, 1973, Black married actor Robert "Skip" Burton. They appeared together in the first segment of Trilogy of Terror (1975), but had separated by the time it premiered.

In January 1975, with her divorce from Burton pending, Black met screenwriter L. M. Kit Carson in Beverly Hills during an interview for Oui magazine. They married on July 4 of that year when she was pregnant with their son Hunter. Black and Carson separated in 1980 and divorced in 1983. In 1989, when Hunter was 13, he decided to live with his father and stepmother, and did not see Black for a decade.

In 1981, Black announced her engagement to Michael Raeburn, who wrote the screenplay for her low-budget star vehicle Killing Heat. The two did not marry. Black's next significant relationship was with Paul Williams, who directed her in 1982's Miss Right.

In August 1983, Black met her fourth husband, film editor Stephen Eckelberry at a Scientology retreat in Clearwater, Florida. The couple married on September 27, 1987 and adopted a daughter. Black and Eckelberry remained married until her death in 2013.

Fellow Scientologist actress Lee Purcell was Black's best friend for 43 years. Other close friends included Barbara Bain, Harriet Schock and Angela Garcia Combs.

== Illness and death ==
In November 2010, Black was diagnosed with ampullary cancer. She had a portion of her pancreas removed and underwent two further operations. She was invited to attend the premiere of the salvaged feature film Dark Blood, in which she had played a small part in the original early 1990s shoot. Black was unable to attend the event, held in the Netherlands in September 2012, due to her illness.

On August 8, 2013, Black died at West Hills Hospital in Los Angeles, from the ampullary cancer, aged 74. Black's funeral was held on August 19 in Oceanside, California, followed by a Hollywood memorial on September 17.

Actress Juliette Lewis paid tribute, saying "Karen Black was my mentor and a second mother to me. She inspired everyone she came in contact with." Peter Fonda, her co-star in Easy Rider, commented upon her death: "[Karen] managed to play kooky, she managed to play sexy, she managed to play crazed. She managed to play all the different ways of human nature." Black is interred at Eternal Hills Memorial Park in Oceanside.

== Sources ==
- Klossner, Michael (2006). Prehistoric Humans in Film and Television: 581 Dramas, Comedies and Documentaries, 1905-2004. Jefferson, North Carolina: McFarland. ISBN 978-0-786-42215-9.
- Segrave, Kerry; Martin, Linda (1990). The Post-Feminist Hollywood Actress: Biographies and Filmographies of Stars Born After 1939. Jefferson, North Carolina: McFarland. ISBN 978-0-899-50387-5 – via Internet Archive.
- Stanley, John (2000). Creature Features: The Science Fiction, Fantasy, and Horror Movie Guide. New York: Berkley Boulevard Books. ISBN 978-0-425-17517-0.
- Weldon, Michael (1996). The Psychotronic Video Guide To Film. New York: Macmillan. ISBN 978-0-312-13149-4.
- Bay, Diane (2022). Finding Karen Black: Roots Become Wings. Frederick, Maryland: Roots to Wings Press, LLC. ISBN 978-0-578-37371-3.
