= Angela Garcia Combs =

American writer and director (born 1962)

- Born: 3 July 1962 (age 63); New York City, U.S.
- Occupations: Writer, director
- Parents: Charles Combs Jr. (father); Carmen Garcia (mother)

Angela Joy Garcia Combs (born July 3, 1962) is an American writer and director. She studied theatre and film with a minor in women's studies at UCLA School of Theater, Film and Television. Garcia Combs has directed theater, shorts and feature film. Throughout her career she has written and published short stories, essays and theatre criticism as well as having optioned several screenplays. Her feature film, "Nothing Special" (2010) was curated by the Academy of Motion Pictures Arts and Sciences for their "Permanent Core Collection" and stars Karen Black in her last starring role. "Nothing Special" received International distribution, critical acclaim and 12 festival awards, including the Best Debut Feature award at "The Female Eye," the Toronto based International film festival dedicated to films directed by women.

== Early life ==
Garcia Combs was born in New York City and is the fourth of five children to a Southern Catholic Mexican-Irish family. She spent her early childhood in Shreveport, Louisiana. Her mother, Carmen Garcia, is a found objects artist and her father, Charles Combs Jr. was a jazz musician and scientist. When she was 8 years old her father moved the family to California and her parents divorced shortly thereafter. Her mother remarried, to her step-father Alan Thoemmes, a Russian immigrant, divorcing six years later. Garcia Combs became an emancipated minor at the age of 16 and worked as a waitress at Marie Callender's along with her siblings.

Garcia Combs married and divorced early, becoming a single mother of three by the age of 28. She raised her three children in Los Angeles as she returned to college and a career in the arts.

== Career ==
As a returning student Garcia Combs entered UCLA's School of Theatre, Film and Television, graduating magna cum laude in 1997. After graduating, she worked as an actress, ghost-writer and a contributing writer for LA Stage, Southern California's performing arts magazine. She wrote and directed numerous short films including "A Better Mother," "Long John," "Mrs. Freud," "Tea or Coffee," and "Smile." She optioned her first full-length screenplay, "A Better Mother" to Carlton America in 1999 and was attached to direct "Random Acts" which was optioned to Henry Jaglom of Rainbow Films and RKO in 2000.

Garcia Combs has written a collection of short stories that are published in various literary publications. In 2003, Arts and Letters Journal of Contemporary Culture honored Angela for her novella, "Creature in a Box". The Mississippi Review published her essay "Plus ça Change" in The Politics and Religion issue, Fall 2004. She is also a contributing writer for The Huffington Post's Entertainment column.

Garcia Combs taught writing and directing at Cypress College in southern CA. Together with her students, she wrote and directed a 30 minute mockumentary, entitled "The J.C." She also directed the one-act play Missouri Waltz at the Odyssey Theatre Ensemble and Blank Theatre in Los Angeles.

Garcia Combs has written over 10 feature-length screenplays and two stage plays. Her work covers topical cultural dilemmas and addresses a variety of socio economic issues, examining changing gender roles and identities, as well as the complicated amalgamations of family.

Garcia Combs is a member of Film Fatales women's independent filmmaker collective.

=== Nothing Special ===
Garcia Combs' first feature film, Nothing Special starred Karen Black and Barbara Bain. The film received a domestic release through Laemmle's Theatres in 2011. The film was picked up by House of Film for International distribution and RSquared for North American distribution. "Nothing Special" has been curated by the Academy of Motion Pictures Arts and Sciences for their "Permanent Core Collection" and marks Karen Blacks' last starring role. After watching the film, the publisher of The Olympian, George Le Masurier, wrote, "Through her film, Garcia Combs tells us that devoting your life to such a noble endeavor as caring for a sick family member while struggling to balance your own ambitions and romantic dreams really is something special." In a review for LA Weekly Veronika Ferdman writes, "through Louise's often funny voice-over narration, Garcia Combs does manage to fleetingly scrape together some insight into some people's desperate need to feel special, even if only inside their own heads." In a capsule review for the Los Angeles Times, Gary Goldstein describes the film as "Badly paced, ineptly written and filled with superfluous moments". A review from The Hollywood Reporter states "Artificiality prevents this trite mother-daughter dramedy from hitting home." John Anderson writes in a review for Variety, "Despite a title that invites abuse, "Nothing Special" is a raggedly charming indie". In a review for JWR, James Wegg writes, "Everything is done with such loving care [...] and sense of style that the appetite is whetted for another chapter from this talented filmmaker."

== Personal life ==
Garcia Combs raised her three children as a single mother in Los Angeles until May 2001 when she remarried Richard Wilson.
