= Aïda Ruilova =

American artist (born 1974)

Aïda Ruilova (born 1974 in West Virginia) is an American contemporary artist.

== Life ==
Ruilova studied at the University of South Florida, Tampa and the School of Visual Arts, New York. She lives in New York City.

== Work ==
Based on her early involvement in various independent avant-garde rock formations, Ruilova began to work and experiment with video in the late 1990s. With music continuing to be an important part of her practice in terms of a special rhythmic connection and the sound design of her films remained. Today she is mainly known as a video artist, but she also works in other media such as sculpture, drawing or graphics, which she installs in her exhibitions together with her videos and connects visually and auditorily in a relationship. Sexuality, obsessions and violence, as well as cinematographic and pop cultural references, are important fields of reference for her artistic work.

Her work is included in the collection of the Pérez Art Museum Miami, and has been shown in numerous galleries and group exhibitions, including representation in multiple international Art Biennials, and nominated for the Hugo Boss Prize for contemporary art in 2006.

== Solo exhibitions (selection) ==
- 2018 Galerie Guido W. Baudach, lips, pipes and banana, Berlin
- 2017 Fortnight Institute, Smoke Gets In Your Eyes, New York
- 2016 Marlborough Chelsea, The Pink Palace, New York
- 2014 Galerie Guido W. Baudach, Hey… Oh no… You're Pretty…, Berlin
- 2013 Kayne Griffin Corcoran, I'm So Wild about your Strawberry Mouth, Los Angeles
- 2011 Salon 94 Bowery, Goner, New York
- 2010 Centro de Arte Contemporáneo La Conservera, Aïda Ruilova, Ceutí, Spain
- 2009 Contemporary Art Center New Orleans, The Singles: 1999 – Now, New Orleans
- 2008 Aspen Art Museum, The Singles: 1999 – Now, Aspen
- 2007 Salon 94 Freemans, Lulu, New York
- 2007 The Kitchen, The Silver Globe, New York
- 2003 Center for Curatorial Studies, Bard College, Untitled, Annandale-on-Hudson, USA
- 2002 Salon 94, Come to life, New York
- 2000 White Columns, White Room, New York

== Group exhibitions (selection) ==
- 2018 Hiromi Yoshii Gallery, In media res, Tokyo
- 2016 Frost Art Museum, Resonance/Dissonance, Miami
- 2015 Haus der Kunst, Die kalte Libido – Sammlung Goetz im Haus der Kunst, Munich
- 2015 MACBA, PUNK. Its Traces in Contemporary Art, Barcelona
- 2014 PAC Padiglione D' Arte Contemporanea, The Crime was Almost Perfect, Milan
- 2013 MoMA Library, Reading List: Artists' Selections from the MoMA Library Collection, New York
- 2012 SCAD Museum of Art, Pose/Re-Pose, Savannah
- 2011 54th Venice Biennale, Garage Projects, Commercial Break, Venice
- 2011 Institute of Contemporary Arts, Festival of Ideas, ICA, London
- 2011 Schirn Kunsthalle, Geheimgesellschaften / Secret Societies, Frankfurt
- 2010 Solomon R. Guggenheim Museum, Haunted: Contemporary Photography/Video/Performance, New York
- 2010 KW Institute for Contemporary Art, Highlights from the Cologne Kunstfilmbiennale in Berlin, Berlin
- 2009 Museo Universitario de Arte Contemporáneo, Las líneas de la mano, Mexico-City
- 2008 Fondazione Nicola Trussardi, Tarantula, Milan
- 2007 The Second Biennial of New Visual Art Performance, Performa07, The Silver Globe, New York
- 2007 ZKM, Between two deaths, Karlsruhe
- 2007 2nd Moscow Biennale, Moscow
- 2006 Kunstmuseum Bern, Six Feet Under, Bern
- 2006 4. Berlin Biennale für zeitgenössische Kunst, Von Mäusen und Menschen, Berlin
- 2005 P.S.1 Contemporary Art Center, Greater New York 2005, New York
- 2005 Bronx Museum, IRREDUCIBLE: Contemporary Short Form Video, 1995-2005, New York
- 2004 Academy of Fine Arts, Philadelphia
- 2003 Museum of Contemporary Art, Chicago
- 2003 New Museum at Field Day, New York
- 2001 Stedelijk Museum voor Actuele Kunst (S.M.A.K), Casino 2001, Ghent
- 1999 Museu Nacional de Historia Natural, Hi-8, Lisbon
