= Cynthia Hargrave =

American film producer and screenwriter (1957–2021)

Cynthia Hargrave (June 12, 1957 – June 9, 2021) was an American film producer and screenwriter. She is best known for her work on Bottle Rocket (1996) and Perfume (2001).
