= List of Dean Stockwell performances =

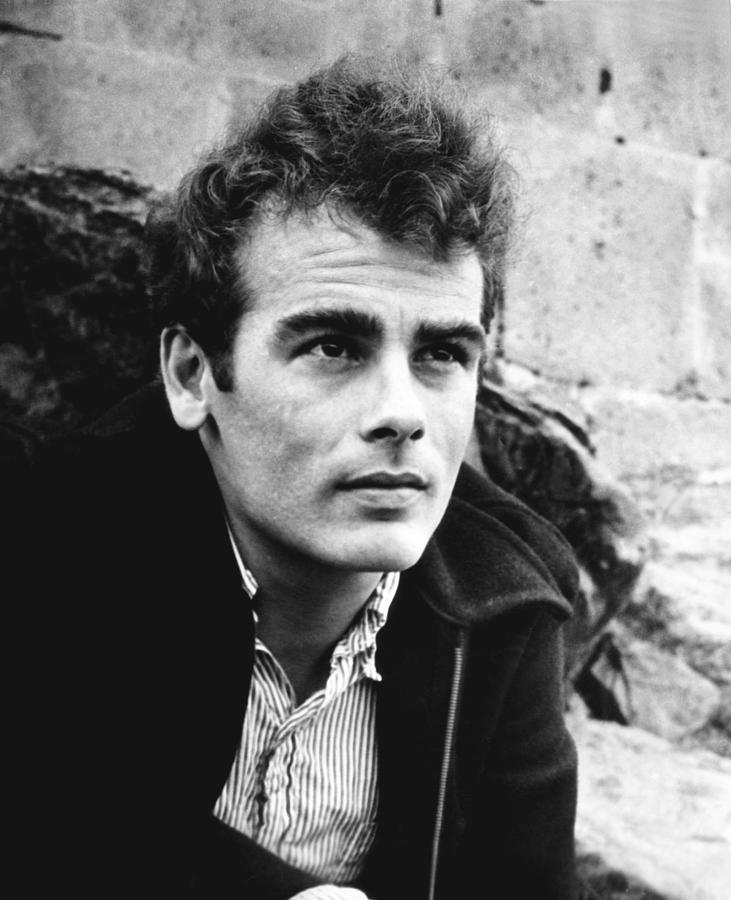
Stockwell in 1965

Dean Stockwell was an American actor whose career spanned over 70 years. He began his career as a child actor, performing as a contract player for Metro-Goldwyn-Mayer. In the 1960s, he transitioned into adult roles, appearing in Sons and Lovers (1960) and Rapture (1965), followed by The Dunwich Horror (1970) and Dennis Hopper's The Last Movie (1971).

Stockwell had a career revival in the 1980s, appearing in Wim Wenders' acclaimed drama Paris, Texas (1984), followed by roles in David Lynch's films Dune (1984) and Blue Velvet (1986). In 1988, he received critical notice for his portrayal of Howard Hughes in Francis Ford Coppola's Tucker: The Man and His Dream, as well as his role in Jonathan Demme's Married to the Mob, for which he was nominated for an Academy Award for Best Supporting Actor. Stockwell subsequently appeared in Robert Altman's The Player (1992), and reunited with Coppola to appear in The Rainmaker (1997).

== Film ==
Year	Title	Role	Director(s)	Notes	Ref.
1945	The Valley of Decision	Paulie	Tay Garnett		
1945	Anchors Aweigh	Donald Martin	George Sidney		
1945	Abbott and Costello in Hollywood	Dean	S. Sylvan Simon		
1946	The Green Years	Robert Shannon	Victor Saville		
1946	Home, Sweet Homicide	Archie Carstairs	Lloyd Bacon		
1947	The Mighty McGurk	Nipper	John Waters		
1947	The Arnelo Affair	Ricky Parkson	Arch Oboler		
1947	The Romance of Rosy Ridge	Andrew MacBean	Roy Rowland		
1947	A Really Important Person	Billy Reilly	Basil Wrangell	Short film	
1947	Song of the Thin Man	Nick Charles, Jr.	Edward Buzzell		
1947	Gentleman's Agreement	Tommy Green	Elia Kazan		
1948	Deep Waters	Donny Mitchell	Henry King		
1948	The Boy with Green Hair	Peter Fry	Joseph Losey		
1949	Down to the Sea in Ships	Jed Hoy	Henry Hathaway		
1949	The Secret Garden	Colin Craven	Fred M. Wilcox		
1950	Stars in My Crown	John Kenyon	Jacques Tourneur		
1950	The Happy Years	John Humperdink Stover	William A. Wellman		
1950	Kim	Kim	Victor Saville		
1951	Cattle Drive	Chester Graham, Jr.	Kurt Neumann		
1957	Gun for a Coward	Hade Keough	Abner Biberman		
1957	The Careless Years	Jerry Vernon	Arthur Hiller		
1959	Compulsion	Judd Steiner	Richard Fleischer		
1960	Sons and Lovers	Paul Morel	Jack Cardiff		
1962	Long Day's Journey into Night	Edmund Tyrone	Sidney Lumet		
1965	Rapture	Joseph	John Guillermin		
1968	Psych-Out	Dave	Richard Rush		
1970	The Dunwich Horror	Wilbur Whateley	Daniel Haller		
1971	The Last Movie	Billy the Kid	Dennis Hopper		
1972	The Loners	Stein	Sutton Roley		
1973	The Werewolf of Washington	Jack Whittier	Milton Moses Ginsberg		
1974	The Pacific Connection	Miguel	Luis Nepomuceno		
1975	Win, Place or Steal	Billy	Richard Bailey		
1975	Eadweard Muybridge, Zoopraxographer	Narrator	Thom Andersen		
1976	Citizen Soldier	Dannes	Michael Elsey		
1976	One Away	Pete Bass	Sidney Hayers		
1976	Won Ton Ton, the Dog Who Saved Hollywood	Paul Lavell	Michael Winner		
1977	Tracks	Mark	Henry Jaglom		
1979	She Came to the Valley	Pat Westall	Albert Band		
1982	Alsino and the Condor	Frank	Miguel Littín		
1982	Wrong Is Right	Hacker	Richard Brooks		
1982	Human Highway	Otto Quartz	Himself	Also writer and co-director	
1984	Paris, Texas	Walter "Walt" Henderson	Wim Wenders		
1984	Dune	Wellington Yueh	David Lynch		
1985	To Kill a Stranger	John Carver	Juan López Moctezuma		
1985	Papa Was a Preacher	John	Steve Feke		
1985	The Legend of Billie Jean	Muldaur	Matthew Robbins		
1985	To Live and Die in L.A.	Bob Grimes	William Friedkin		
1986	Blue Velvet	Ben	David Lynch		
1987	The Time Guardian	Boss	Brian Hannant		
1987	Banzai Runner	Billy Baxter	John G. Thomas		
1987	Gardens of Stone	Capt. Homer Thomas	Francis Ford Coppola		
1987	Beverly Hills Cop II	Charles "Chip" Cain	Tony Scott		
1988	Palais Royale	Michael Dattalico	Martin Lavut		
1988	The Long Haul	Mario	Paulo Thiago		
1988	The Blue Iguana	Detective Carl Strick	John Lafia		
1988	Tucker: The Man and His Dream	Howard Hughes	Francis Ford Coppola		
1988	Married to the Mob	Anthony "Tony the Tiger" Russo	Jonathan Demme	Nominated for an Academy Award for Best Supporting Actor	
1989	Buying Time	Detective Novak	Mitchell Gabourie		
1990	Limit Up	Peter Oak	Richard Martini		
1990	Sandino	Captain Hatfield	Miguel Littin		
1990	Catchfire	John Luponi	Dennis Hopper		
1992	Friends and Enemies	Freddie	Andrew Frank		
1992	The Player	Andy Civella	Robert Altman		
1994	Chasers	Salesman Stig	Dennis Hopper		
1995	Naked Souls	Duncan	Lyndon Chubbuck		
1996	Mr. Wrong	Jack Tramonte	Nick Castle		
1996	Last Resort	Grey Wolf	Lyman Dayton		
1997	McHale's Navy	Capt. Wallace B. Binghamton	Bryan Spicer		
1997	Midnight Blue	Katz-Feeney	Skott Snider		
1997	Living in Peril	William	Jack Ersgard		
1997	Air Force One	Defense Secretary Walter Dean	Wolfgang Petersen		
1997	The Shadow Men	Stan Mills	Timothy Bond		
1997	The Rainmaker	Judge Harvey Hale	Francis Ford Coppola		
1998	Sinbad: The Battle of the Dark Knights	Bophisto	Alan Mehrez		
1999	Restraining Order	Charlie Mason	Lee H. Katzin		
1999	Water Damage	Det. Frank Skoufaris	Murray Battle		
1999	The Venice Project	Sen. Campbell	Robert Dornhelm		
1999	Rites of Passage	Del Farraday	Victor Salva	Also associate producer	
2000	The Flunky	Micky	Vincent Van Patten		
2000	They Nest	Sheriff Hobbs	Ellory Elkayem		
2000	Batman Beyond: Return of the Joker	Tim Drake	Curt Geda	Voice	
2001	In Pursuit	Charles Welz	Peter Pistor		
2001	Italian Ties	Jimmy	Ellie Kanner		
2001	CQ	Dr. Ballard	Roman Coppola		
2001	The Quickie	Michael	Sergey Bodrov		
2001	Buffalo Soldiers	General Lancaster	Gregor Jordan		
2002	Inferno	Mayor Bill Klinger	Dusty Nelson		
2004	The Manchurian Candidate	Mark Whiting	Jonathan Demme		
2007	The Deal	Agent Tremayne	Bryan Goeres		
2008	Al's Beef	The Sheriff	Dennis Hauck	Short film	
2008	The Cool School	Himself	Morgan Neville	Documentary	
2013	C.O.G.	Hobbs	Kyle Patrick Alvarez		
2013	Persecuted	Dave Wilson	Daniel Lusko		
2013	Max Rose	Ben Tracey	Daniel Noah		
2014	Deep in the Darkness	Phil Deighton	Colin Theys		
2014	Rusty Steel	Hunts	Ion Ionescu		
2015	Entertainment	Frank	Rick Alverson		

== Television ==
Year	Title	Role	Notes
1956	NBC Matinee Theater	—N/a	4 episodes
1957–1961	Wagon Train	Will Santee / Rodney Lawrence / Juan Ortega / Jimmy Drew	4 episodes
1958	Cimarron City	Bud Tatum	Episode: "Kid on a Calico Horse"
1959	Buick-Electra Playhouse	Nick Adams	Episode: "The Killers"
1959	Johnny Staccato	Dave	Episode: "Nature of the Night"
1960	Checkmate	Roddy Stevenson	Episode: "Cyanide Touch"
1960	The DuPont Show with June Allyson	Johnny Perry	Episode: "The Dance Man"
1961	The Twilight Zone	Lt. Katell	Episode: "A Quality of Mercy"
1961	Alfred Hitchcock Presents	Billy Weaver	S6:E19, "The Landlady"
1962	The Alfred Hitchcock Hour	David H. Kelsey / William Newmaster	Season 1 Episode 7: "Annabel"
1963	Combat!	Rob Lawson	Episode: "High Named Today"
1964	Kraft Suspense Theatre	Martin Rosetti	Episode: "Their Own Executioners"
1965	Dr. Kildare	Dr. Rudy Deveraux	6 episodes
1969	Bonanza	Matthew Rush	Episode: "The Medal"
1971	Mannix	Chris Townsend	Episode: "A Step in Time"
1971	Paper Man	Avery Jensen	Television film
1971	The Failing of Raymond	Raymond	Television film
1972	The Adventures of Nick Carter	Freddy Duncan	Pilot
1972	Columbo	Eric Wagner	Episode: "The Most Crucial Game"
1973	Mission: Impossible	Gunnar Malestrom	Episode: "The Pendulum"
1973	Night Gallery	Charlie Evans	Episode: "Whisper"
1973	The Streets of San Francisco	Paul Thomas	Episode: "Legion of the Lost"
1973	Orson Welles Great Mysteries	Jerry	Episode: "Unseen Alibi"
1975	Police Story	Ott / Detective Giacino / Detective Callan / Bennett	4 episodes
1975	Cop on the Beat	Det. Callan	Television film
1975	Columbo	Lloyd Harrington	Episode: "Troubled Waters"
1975	Cannon	Tom Longman	Episode: "The Hero"
1975	Ellery Queen	Cliff Waddell	Episode: "The Adventure of the Blunt Instrument"
1975	Three for the Road	Ethan Crawford	Episode: "The Trail of Bigfoot"
1976	McCloud	Pete Lancaster	Episode: "'Twas the Fight before Christmas"
1977	A Killing Affair	Kenneth Switzer	Television film
1977	Quinn Martin's Tales of the Unexpected	Richard Ayres	Episode: "No Way Out"
1978	Greatest Heroes of the Bible	Hissar	Episode: "Daniel in the Lion's Den"
1981	Born to Be Sold	Marty Helick	Television film
1982	Hart to Hart	James Francis	Episode: "Harts' Desire"
1983	The A-Team	Officer Collins	Episode: "A Small and Deadly War"
1985	Miami Vice	Jack Gretsky	Episode: "Bushido"
1986	Hunter	Brother Harold Hobarts	Episode: "Bad Company"
1987	The Gambler, Part III: The Legend Continues	James McLaughlin	Television film
1988	Murder, She Wrote	Eliot Easterbrook	Episode: "Deadpan"
1989–1993	Quantum Leap	Admiral Al Calavicci	97 episodes
1989	The Twilight Zone	Martin Decker	Episode: "Room 2426"
1990–1992	Captain Planet and the Planeteers	Duke Nukem	Voice, 9 episodes
1991	Son of the Morning Star	General Philip Sheridan	Miniseries
1992	Roseanne	Ralph	Episode: "Breaking Up Is Hard to Do"
1993	Bonanza: The Return	Augustus Brandenburg	Television film
1994	Vanishing Son II	Mickey Jo Valmont	Television film
1994	Justice in a Small Town	Commissioner Sam Caldwell	Television film
1994	The Innocent	Capt. Jason Flaboe	Television film
1994	Madonna: Innocence Lost	Tony Ciccone	Television film
1994	In the Line of Duty: The Price of Vengeance	Jack Lowe	Television film
1994	Chicago Hope	Robert St. Clair	Episode: "Songs from the Cuckoo Birds"
1994	Lois & Clark: The New Adventures of Superman	Preston Carpenter	Episode: "The Rival"
1995	The Langoliers	Bob Jenkins	2 episodes
1995	The Man from Snowy River	Professor Julius Waugh	2 episodes
1995	Nowhere Man	Gus Shepherd	Episode: "You Really Got a Hold on Me"
1996	Unabomber: The True Story	Ben Jeffries	Television film
1997–1998	The Tony Danza Show	Frank DiMeo	14 episodes
1998	It's True	Mr. Murphy	Pilot
1998–1999	Phenomenon: The Lost Archives	Host	14 episodes
1999	What Katy Did	Tramp	Television film
1999	The Drew Carey Show	Hal	Episode: "Y2K, You're Okay"
2002–2004	JAG	Edward Sheffield, SecNav	11 episodes
2002	First Monday	Senator Edward Sheffield	3 episodes
2002	Star Trek: Enterprise	Colonel Grat	Episode: "Detained"
2002	Stargate SG-1	Doctor Kieran	Episode: "Shadow Play"
2006–2009	Battlestar Galactica	John Cavil / Number One Cylon	15 episodes
2008	Crash	Frankie Navajo	Episode: "Los Muertos"
2009	The Dunwich Horror	Dr. Henry Armitage	Television film
2009	Battlestar Galactica: The Plan	John Cavil / Number One Cylon	Television film
2014	Enlisted	Dan	Episode: "Vets"
2014	NCIS: New Orleans	Tom Hamilton	Episode: "Chasing Ghosts"

== Stage ==
Year	Title	Role	Venue	Notes	Ref.
1943	The Innocent Voyage	John Thornton	Belasco Theatre		
1957	Compulsion	Judd Steiner	Ambassador Theatre		
1962	Endgame & The New Tenant	—N/a	Coronet Theatre	As director	
1974	Relatively Speaking	Philip	Albuquerque Little Theatre		
1978	Come Blow Your Horn	Alan Baker	Union Plaza		
1979	Short Nightgown and Panties	N/A	Pilot Theater	As director	
1979	Man With Bags	—N/a	Pilot Theater	As director	
1980	Eagle in New Mexico		Paolo Soleri Amphitheater		
1981	Here Lies Jeremy Troy		Sebastian's West Playhouse		

== Radio ==
Year	Program	Episode	Ref.
1952	Lux Radio Theatre	Kim	
1951	Suspense	Aria from Murder	
