= Milton Moses Ginsberg =

American film director (1935–2021)

- Born: September 22, 1935; The Bronx, New York, U.S.
- Died: May 23, 2021 (aged 85); Manhattan, New York, U.S.
- Education: Columbia University (BA)
- Occupations: Director, Writer, Editor,
- Spouse: Nina Posnansky

Milton Moses Ginsberg (September 22, 1935 – May 23, 2021) was an American film director and editor. He was noted for writing and directing Coming Apart, a 1969 film starring Rip Torn and Sally Kirkland, and The Werewolf of Washington starring Dean Stockwell.

== Early life ==
Ginsberg was born in the New York City borough of The Bronx on September 22, 1935, to Jewish parents Elias, a cutter in Manhattan's garment district, and Fannie (née Weis), a housewife. He attended the Bronx High School of Science, before studying literature at Columbia University, where he obtained a bachelor's degree.

== Career ==
=== Coming Apart ===
Ginsberg directed his first feature film, Coming Apart, in 1969. It starred Rip Torn as a mentally disturbed psychologist who secretly films his sexual encounters with women. Sally Kirkland, who was simultaneously filming Futz! at the time, also stars. The film was shot in a one-room, 15 ft × 17 ft (4.6 m × 5.2 m) apartment in Kips Bay Plaza, on a budget of $60,000. Shooting lasted three weeks. Ginsberg filmed the entire movie with one static camera setup, in a manner simulating a non-constructed "fake documentary" style, influenced by Jim McBride's David Holzman's Diary.

Critical reception was mixed. Life reviewer Richard Schickel praised Torn's performance, Ginsberg's inventive use of camera and sound, and the "illuminating" portrayal of a schizophrenic breakdown. Critic Andrew Sarris gave it a less-favorable review, and the film was a commercial failure. The film later attained a cult following among critics and filmmakers.

In a 1999 volume of Film Comment, Ginsberg stated:

... the film was about a psychiatrist encased in his own reflection, using a hidden camera to record his own disintegration. The film was also about the pleasures and price of promiscuity, and about the form and duration of cinema itself - or so I hoped. And to a degree that still embarrasses, it was about me. Appropriate, the title, Coming Apart.

=== Subsequent work ===
In 1973, Ginsberg wrote and directed the satirical horror film The Werewolf of Washington starring Dean Stockwell. Eschewing the minimalism of his previous feature, Ginsberg demonstrated a more technically complex film style.

After a diagnosis of non-Hodgkin's Lymphoma in 1975, Ginsberg became depressed and withdrew from filmmaking. He returned to directing in 1999 and 2001, with the short films The City Below the Line and The Haloed Bird.

After his final feature film, Ginsberg primarily made a living as a film editor, working on two Academy Award-winning documentaries, Down and Out in America and The Personals, among others. He edited both parts of the miniseries Fidel (2002) for director David Attwood.

== Personal life ==
Ginsberg married Nina Posnansky, a painter, in 1983. They remained married until his death.

Ginsberg died on May 23, 2021, at his apartment in Manhattan. He was 85, and suffered from cancer prior to his death.

== Filmography ==
Year	Title	Notes	Ref.
1969	Coming Apart	Director	
1973	The Werewolf of Washington	Writer and director	
1986	Down and Out in America	Editor	
1990	Listen Up: The Lives Of Quincy Jones	Editor	
1995	Catwalk	Editor	
1997	Pronto	Editor	
1998	The Personals: Improvisations on Romance in the Golden Years	Editor	
2000	Sidney Poitier: One Bright Light	Editor	
2002	Fidel	Editor	
2005	A Father... A Son... Once upon a Time in Hollywood	Editor	
