= Coming Apart (film) =

- Directed by: Milton Moses Ginsberg
- Written by: Milton Moses Ginsberg
- Produced by: Israel Davis; Andrew J. Kuehn
- Starring: Rip Torn; Sally Kirkland; Viveca Lindfors
- Cinematography: Jack Yager
- Edited by: Lawrence Tetenbaum
- Music by: Jefferson Airplane (original cut); Francis Xavier (re-release)
- Distributed by: Kaleidoscope Films
- Release date: October 26, 1969 (New York)
- Running time: 110 minutes
- Country: United States
- Language: English
- Budget: $60,000

Coming Apart is a 1969 American found footage psychological drama film written and directed by Milton Moses Ginsberg, and starring Rip Torn, Sally Kirkland, and Viveca Lindfors. The film follows a mentally disturbed psychiatrist (Torn) who surreptitiously films his encounters with women in a secretly rented apartment. The film was shot using one static camera setup, in a manner simulating a non-constructed "fake documentary" style, influenced by Jim McBride's David Holzman's Diary (1967). The film was rated X for its sexually explicit scenes.

In its original cut, the film featured the music of Jefferson Airplane. However, due to rights issues, the film was re-scored by Ginsberg and Francis Xavier for its home media releases.

== Plot ==
New York City psychiatrist Joe Glazer, who is going through a divorce, rents an apartment in Kips Bay under the assumed name of Glassman and installs a hidden movie camera in a mirrored box to record his life and occasionally talk to.

Elaine visits Joe and engages in sadomasochistic sex with him, feigning rape scenarios and asking him to burn her with cigarettes. Anita Spitzer, a model-turned-photographer friend of Elaine's, visits Joe with her infant child after Elaine informs her he is also a photographer; Anita wishes to show him her portfolio. Joe convinces Anita to show him her breasts before unsuccessfully attempting to seduce her. Monica, a patient of Joe's with whom he has carried on a past affair, visits and discusses her marriage to her husband, resulting in an impassioned argument.

Joann, another former patient, visits Joe. Joann fondles him and later admits that she initially thought he was gay. Karen, the wife of one of Joe's friends, visits and expresses her dissatisfaction with her marriage before flirting with Joe. Later, two young female campaigners for Eugene McCarthy stop by the apartment. Joann visits again and performs oral sex on Joe.

Joe holds a party at the apartment with several friends, including Armand, Ted, Joann, and two other women. The party descends into an orgy, during which one of the guests, Sarabelle, is revealed to be a transvestite. Later, a drunken Joann chastises Joe for her personal problems, blaming him for her mistakes and begging him to let her stay in the apartment in his absence as she has recently become homeless. Joann threatens to inform his wife of their affair, leading to a violent confrontation after which Joann storms out.

Filming himself alone, Joe begins to record monologues in which he questions his choices, documenting his own deteriorating mental state; these segments are interspersed by footage of tense visits from Monica, who vocalizes her worries about Joe. Later, Joann is seen staring into the camera in the apartment loading a pistol. Joann thrashes around the apartment, destroying furniture before hurling a decorative stone at the mounted wall mirror behind the camera, causing it to shatter into pieces.

== Cast ==
- Rip Torn as Dr. Joe Glazer / Mr. Glassman
- Sally Kirkland as Joann
- Viveca Lindfors as Monica
- Megan McCormick as Joy
- Kevin O'Connor as Armand
- Michael McGuire as Ted
- Lois Markle as Elaine
- Lynn Swann as Anita Spitzer
- Phoebe Dorin as Karen
- Nancy MacKay as Amy
- Jane Marla Robbins as Lois
- Joanna Vischer as Marilyn
- Julie Garfield as Julie
- Robert Blankshine as Sarabell

== Production ==
Writer-director Moses Allen Ginsberg filmed Coming Apart using a single camera using a static setup, simulating a found footage documentary style inspired by Jim McBride's experimental film David Holzman's Diary (1967).

== Release ==
Coming Apart premiered in New York City on October 26, 1969, and was released with an X rating. It opened the following spring in Los Angeles on March 11, 1970. The film was re-released theatrically in 1999 following restoration by Kino Lorber.

=== Home media ===
The music of Jefferson Airplane is featured throughout the original cut of the film, but was excised from home video releases due to copyright issues. The film was released by Kino Classics on Blu-ray in 2022, featuring the re-scored music by Frances Xavier.

== Music ==
Originally released with an X rating in 1969, a large part of the film’s intensity came from its use of several tracks taken from Jefferson Airplane’s live album Bless Its Pointed Little Head. The 35mm revival screenings in 1999 included the original soundtrack, but when the film was released on home video by Kino Lorber the following year, licensing the original Jefferson Airplane tracks proved impossible, so the entire soundtrack was replaced by Francis Xavier and the director himself. A significant problem in this alteration was that because the songs were played on set using a stereo system, the replacement tracks had to be layered over the originals to obscure them, but in order to retain the film’s original dialogue, the replacement tracks had to be muted in those sections. Careful listeners will be able to hear the original Jefferson Airplane tracks bleeding through under several of the dialogue exchanges.

== Reception ==
=== Contemporary ===
Vincent Canby of The New York Times wrote, "As an attempt to elevate pornography ... into art, it is often witty and funny but it fails for several reasons, including Ginsberg's self-imposed limitations on form (to which he's not completely faithful)." He elaborated that "the screenplay, like the film, eventually drifts in a horizontal direction into a kind of foggy confusion." Variety stated, "The problem with Coming Apart is that while it suggests some interesting ideas, it can't deliver any of them in cogent form. If Torn is supposed to be some form of saint in the 20th century religion of psychiatry, prepared to accept the truth of his perceptions with detached irony, this only adds to the deadness of the film as public entertainment." Gene Siskel of the Chicago Tribune gave the film 3.5 stars out of 4 and praised Torn for "a brilliantly controlled performance. He never appears to be acting."

Kevin Thomas of the Los Angeles Times wrote, "In this dreary study of the disintegration of a New York psychologist (Rip Torn), Ginsberg made the mistake of placing professional actors in improvised Warhol-like situations ... What we're left with, consequently, is scarcely more than some mild but mainly tedious pornography for intellectuals." Gary Arnold of The Washington Post wrote, "Compared to the erotic satire, the film's serious pretensions seem so uninspired and derivative that it's only natural to find that your interest dwindles once the characters start sorting out their souls ... the breakdowns turn morbidly sentimental and theatrically pat." Life reviewer Richard Schickel praised Torn's performance, Ginsberg's inventive use of camera and sound, and the "illuminating" portrayal of a schizophrenic breakdown. John Simon unfavorably described the film as "pretentious juvenile pornography."

=== Retrospective ===
The film has since attained a cult following among critics and filmmakers. Andrew Sarris of The Village Voice gave it a less favorable review in 1998. John Anderson of Newsday awarded the film a mixed review in a 1999 assessment, praising the performance and noting that audiences at the time of the film's initial release could not "deny its magnetic morbidity... Ultimately, though, Coming Apart is a time capsule filled with bile. So open at your own risk."

== Related works ==
Ginsberg wrote a movie tie-in novelization of the film which was published by Lancer Books in 1969.

== See also ==
- List of American films of 1969
- New Hollywood

== Sources ==
- Horwath, Alexander (2004). "A Walking Contradiction (Partly True and Partly Fiction)". In Horwath, Alexander; Elsaesser, Thomas; King, Noel (eds.). The Last Great American Picture Show: New Hollywood Cinema in the 1970. Amsterdam, Netherlands: Amsterdam University Press. pp. 83–106. ISBN 978-9-053-56493-6.
- Kawin, Bruce (1978). Mindscreen: Bergman, Godard, and First-Person Film. Princeton, New Jersey: Princeton University Press. ISBN 978-0-691-06365-2.
- Simon, John (1971). Movies into Film Film Criticism 1967-1970. New York City, New York: Dell. OCLC 16674127.
