= Nina Olivette =

American actress (1907–1971)

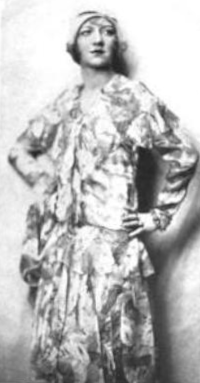
- Born: Hildegarde Lachmann; May 9, 1907; New York, New York, U.S.
- Died: February 21, 1971 (aged 63); New York, New York, U.S.
- Occupations: Actor; dancer
- Spouse: Harry Stockwell (m. 1950)

Nina Olivette (born Hildegarde Lachmann; May 9, 1907 – February 21, 1971) was an American actress and dancer who was sometimes described as a "dancing comedienne".

== Early years ==
Born Elizabeth Margaret Veronica Lachmann in Manhattan, New York, Olivette was the daughter of Edgar and Kazia Prajinska Lachmann. Her father was a cigar manufacturer in his native Germany; in the United States, he became a vice-president in Charles M. Schwab's steel company. Her mother was a ballet dancer in her native Poland; after coming to the United States, she performed in vaudeville.

As a girl, Olivette joined her mother's troupe in ballet performances, but after a leg injury prevented her from maintaining the balance needed to be a ballerina, she turned to combining dancing with comedy.

== Career ==
=== Entertainment ===
Olivette worked with Violet Carlson in a vaudeville act billed as the Lachmann Sisters. When she was 12, producers Jones and Green recruited her for one of their shows, taking her away from vaudeville.

On Broadway, Olivette appeared in Music Box Revue, Queen High, George White's Scandals, The Sweetest Little Devil, Captain Jinks, and Hold Everything!

Much of Olivette's career was spent in comedic roles. Her first straight role came in Twin Beds (1954). She explained in 1930 that her routines were adaptations of existing dances rather than new creations. Starting with a dance such as the Black Bottom or Charleston, she said that she relaxed her muscles, "then [I] try to give the appearance of falling apart while performing it. The effect always seems to be funny."

Olivette's film debut came in Queen High (1930).

She later performed as a vocalist.

=== Designing ===
Olivette designed women's fashion accessories, including handbags, scarves, and stoles. Her products made her "a particularly favorite designer with stage people and television stars". She also was a designer for Your Show of Shows on television in the early 1950s.

== Personal life ==
Olivette was married to Harry Stockwell and was the stepmother of Dean Stockwell and Guy Stockwell.

== Death ==
On February 21, 1971, Olivette died at Polyclinic Hospital following a heart attack. She was 63.
