= List of awards and nominations received by Dean Stockwell =

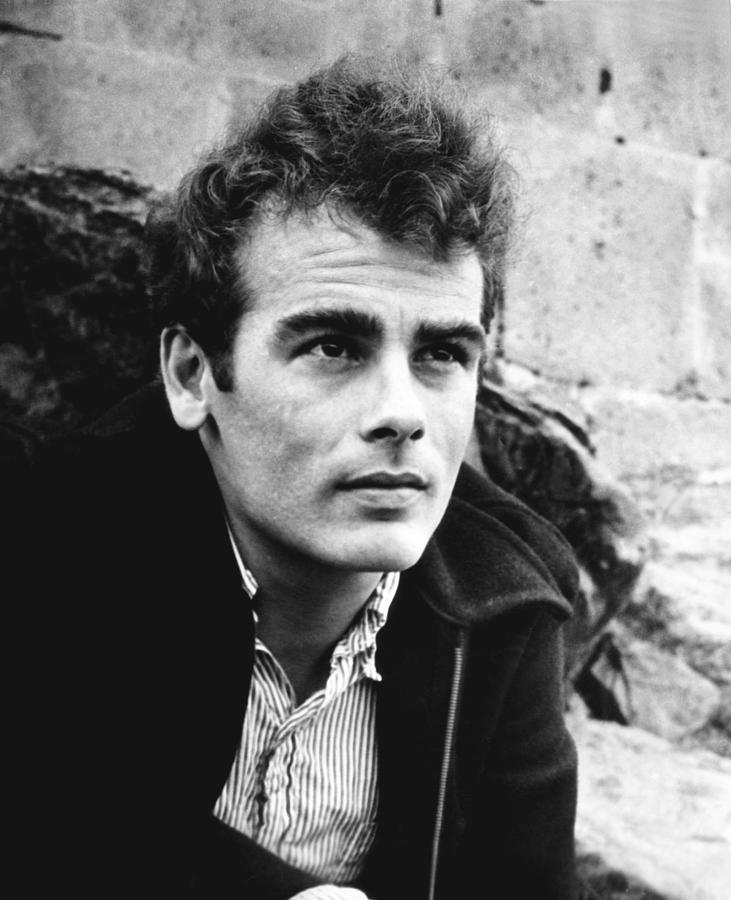
Stockwell in 1965

Dean Stockwell was an American actor whose accolades include two Cannes Best Actor Awards, two Golden Globe Awards, two Golden Globe nominations, one Academy Award nomination, and four Primetime Emmy Award nominations.

Stockwell, a child actor, first garnered critical acclaim for his role in Gentleman's Agreement (1947), for which he won the Golden Globe for Best Juvenile Actor. He was later nominated for the Golden Globe for Best Actor – Motion Picture Drama for his role in Sons and Lovers (1960).

In 1990, he won his second Golden Globe, this time in the category of Golden Best Supporting Actor – Series, Miniseries or Television Film, for his role on the series Quantum Leap. He would earn a further two Golden Globe nominations for the series in this category, as well as four Primetime Emmy Award nominations for Outstanding Supporting Actor in a Drama Series.

== Academy Awards ==
The Academy Awards are a set of awards given by the Academy of Motion Picture Arts and Sciences annually for excellence of cinematic achievements.

Year	Nominated work	Category	Result	Ref.
1988	Married to the Mob	Best Supporting Actor	Nominated	

== Cannes Film Festival ==
Year	Nominated work	Category	Result	Ref.
1959	Compulsion	Best Actor	Won	
1962	Long Day's Journey into Night	Best Actor	Won	

== Golden Globe Awards ==
The Golden Globe Award is an accolade bestowed by the 93 members of the Hollywood Foreign Press Association (HFPA) recognizing excellence in film and television, both domestic and foreign.

Year	Nominated work	Category	Result	Ref.
1947	Gentleman's Agreement	Special Award – Best Juvenile Actor	Won	
1960	Sons and Lovers	Best Actor in a Motion Picture – Drama	Nominated	
1990	Quantum Leap	Best Supporting Actor – Series, Miniseries or Television Film	Won	
1991	Quantum Leap	Best Supporting Actor – Series, Miniseries or Television Film	Nominated	
1993	Quantum Leap	Best Supporting Actor – Series, Miniseries or Television Film	Nominated	

== Primetime Emmy Awards ==
The Primetime Emmy Awards are presented annually by the Academy of Television Arts & Sciences, also known as the Television Academy, to recognize and honor achievements in the television industry.

Year	Nominated work	Category	Result	Ref.
1990	Quantum Leap	Outstanding Supporting Actor in a Drama Series	Nominated	
1991	Quantum Leap	Outstanding Supporting Actor in a Drama Series	Nominated	
1992	Quantum Leap	Outstanding Supporting Actor in a Drama Series	Nominated	
1993	Quantum Leap	Outstanding Supporting Actor in a Drama Series	Nominated	

== Viewers for Quality Television Awards ==
Year	Nominated work	Category	Result	Ref.
1991	Quantum Leap	Best Supporting Actor in Quality Drama Series	Won	
1992	Quantum Leap	Best Supporting Actor in Quality Drama Series	Nominated	

== Critics associations ==
Year	Institution	Category	Nominated work	Result	Ref.
1988	Boston Society of Film Critics	Best Supporting Actor	Tucker: The Man and His Dream	Won	
1988	Boston Society of Film Critics	Best Supporting Actor	Married to the Mob	Won	
1988	Chicago Film Critics Association	Best Supporting Actor	Married to the Mob	Nominated	
1988	National Society of Film Critics	Best Supporting Actor	Tucker: The Man and His Dream	Won	
1988	National Society of Film Critics	Best Supporting Actor	Married to the Mob	Won	
1988	Kansas City Film Critics Circle	Best Supporting Actor	Married to the Mob	Won	
1988	New York Film Critics Circle	Best Supporting Actor	Married to the Mob	Won	
1988	New York Film Critics Circle	Best Supporting Actor	Tucker: The Man and His Dream	Won	
