= Life Without Dick =

- DVD cover
- Directed by: Bix Skahill
- Written by: Bix Skahill
- Produced by: Emily Stevens; Happy Walters; Matthew Weaver
- Starring: Sarah Jessica Parker; Harry Connick, Jr.; Johnny Knoxville
- Cinematography: James Glennon
- Edited by: Peter Fandetti
- Music by: David Nessim Lawrence
- Distributed by: Sony Pictures Video
- Release date: February 5, 2002
- Running time: 96 minutes
- Country: United States
- Language: English

Life Without Dick is a direct-to-video 2002 American black comedy film written and directed by Bix Skahill. The film focuses on the relationship that develops between an incompetent hitman and a woman who accidentally kills her boyfriend when she discovers he's leaving her for another woman.

== Plot ==
Colleen Gibson doesn't realize live-in boyfriend Dick Rasmusson, a third-rate private detective, has been cheating on her until phony psychic Madame Hugonaut inadvertently provides accurate details about his most recent indiscretion. When Colleen confronts him with what she believes is an empty gun, she shoots and kills Dick, who had loaded the firearm without her knowledge.

Enter Daniel Gallagher, an Irish mobster whose desire to be a crooner was dampened by his ex-girlfriend Mary when she laughed at his singing. Daniel has managed not to kill anyone in his short career as a hit man, so when he discovers Colleen has killed Dick, who was next on his hit list, he's happy to take the credit and tell his boss and brother-in-law Jared O'Reilly that he finally completed an assignment. Unfortunately, Jared starts giving him a lot more assignments, and Daniel enlists Colleen to do his dirty work for him.

Complicating matters are Daniel's sister Ivy, who would like to see her husband dead; two bumbling detectives investigating Dick's murder; and the reappearance of Mary and her new boyfriend, mumbling Tony Moretti.

== Cast ==
- Sarah Jessica Parker as Colleen Gibson
- Harry Connick, Jr. as Daniel Gallagher
- Johnny Knoxville as Dick Rasmusson
- Craig Ferguson as Jared O'Reilly
- Teri Garr as Madame Hugonaut
- Brigid Brannagh as Ivy Gallagher O'Reilly
- Claudia Schiffer as Mary
- Erik Palladino as Tony "The Turner" Moretti
- Michael Hitchcock as Religious Guy

== Production ==
In September 2000, it was announced Columbia Pictures had made a deal with Bix Skahill to write and make his directorial debut with Life Without Dick with Sarah Jessica Parker in negotiations to star. Early in development Craig Ferguson and Elijah Wood were considered for roles in the film. In November, Harry Connick Jr. entered negotiations to be the co-lead.
