= Here Comes the Band (film) =

1935 film by Paul Sloane

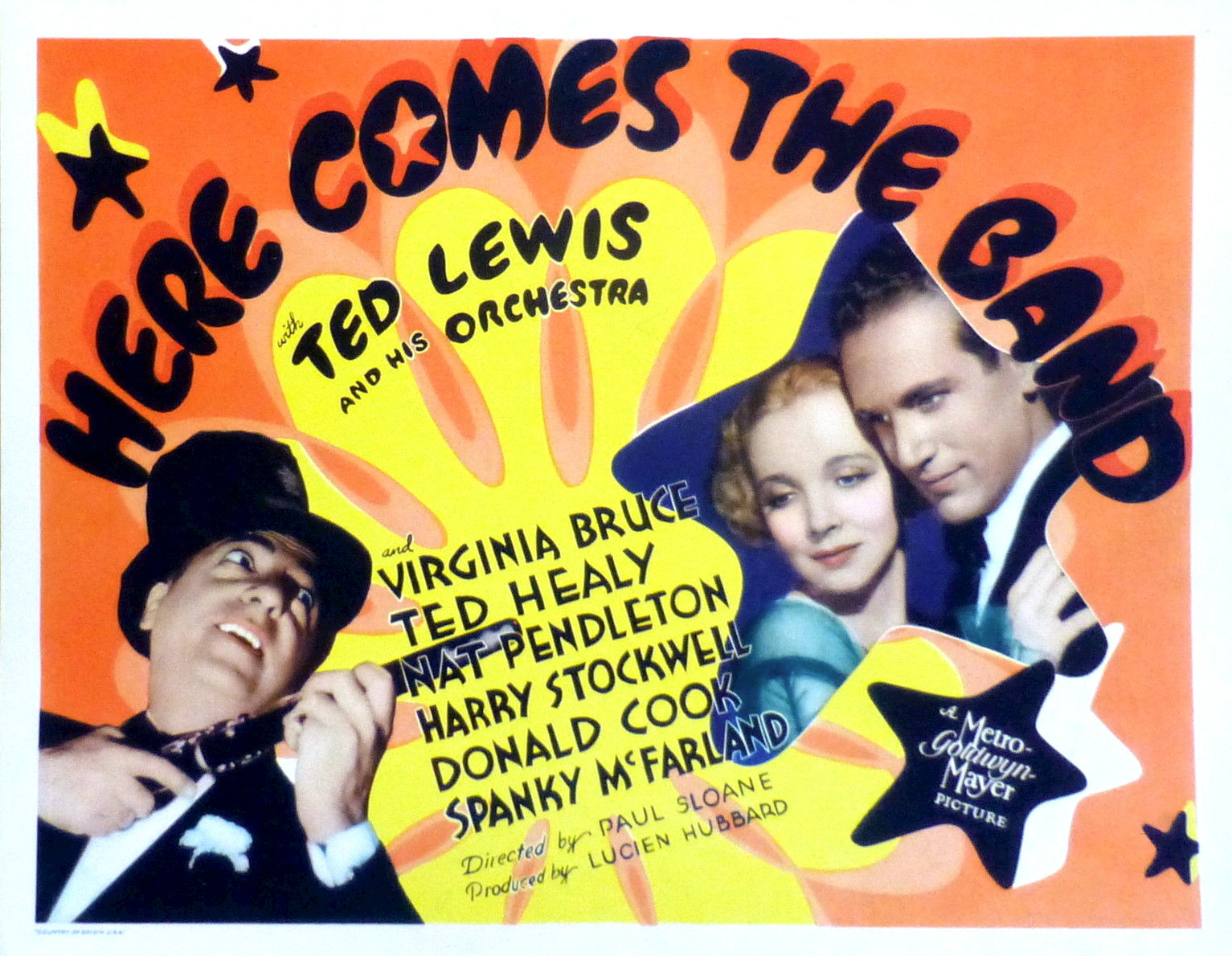
- Lobby card
- Directed by: Paul Sloane
- Screenplay by: Paul Sloane; Ralph Spence; Victor Mansfield
- Produced by: Lucien Hubbard
- Starring: Ted Lewis and His Orchestra; Ted Lewis; Virginia Bruce; Harry Stockwell; Ted Healy; Nat Pendleton
- Cinematography: Charles Edgar Schoenbaum
- Edited by: Frank E. Hull
- Music by: Score: Edward Ward; Songs: Ted Fio Rito; Harry MacPherson; Albert von Tilzer; Burton Lane (music); Walter Donaldson (music); Ned Washington (lyrics); Harold Adamson (lyrics)
- Production company: Metro-Goldwyn-Mayer
- Distributed by: Metro-Goldwyn-Mayer
- Release date: August 30, 1935
- Running time: 86 minutes
- Country: United States
- Language: English

Here Comes the Band is a 1935 American comedy film directed by Paul Sloane and written by Paul Sloane, Ralph Spence and Victor Mansfield. The film stars Ted Lewis and His Orchestra, Ted Lewis, Virginia Bruce, Harry Stockwell, Ted Healy and Nat Pendleton. The film was released on August 30, 1935, by Metro-Goldwyn-Mayer.

== Plot ==
A songwriter sues for copyright infringement by an unscrupulous music producer.

== Cast ==
- Ted Lewis and His Orchestra as Orchestra
- Ted Lewis as Ted Lowry
- Virginia Bruce as Margaret
- Harry Stockwell as Ollie Watts
- Ted Healy as 'Happy'
- Nat Pendleton as 'Piccolo Pete'
- Addison Richards as Colonel Wallace
- Donald Cook as Don Trevor
- George McFarland as Spanky Lowry
- Robert McWade as Judge
- Henry Kolker as Simmon's Attorney
- Robert Gleckler as Simmons
- Richard Tucker as Jim
- Bert Roach as Drummer in Band
- Tyler Brooke as Dentist
- Ferdinand Gottschalk as Armand de Valerie
- May Beatty as Miss Doyle
- Charles Lane as Mr. Scurry
