= Harry Stockwell =

American actor (1902–1984)

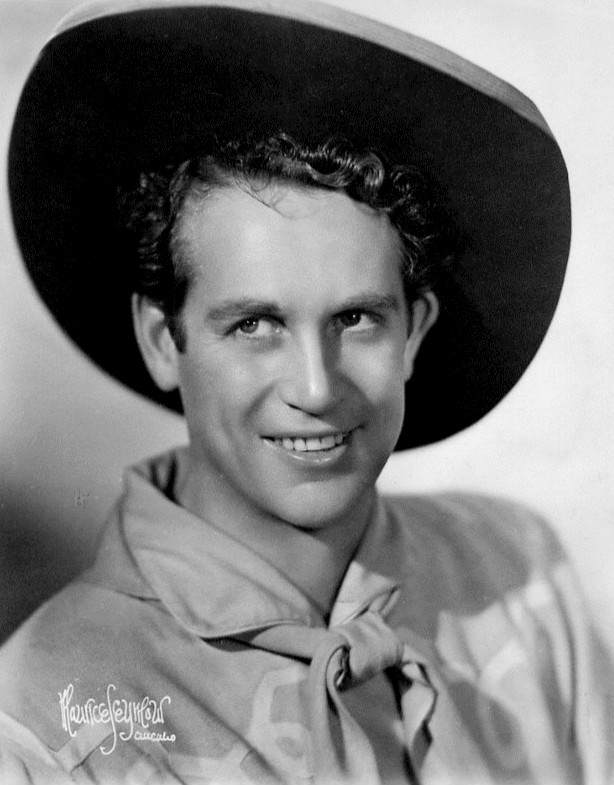
- Stockwell in 1945
- Born: Harry Bayless Stockwell; April 27, 1902; Kansas City, Missouri, U.S.
- Died: July 19, 1984 (aged 82); New York City, U.S.
- Occupations: Actor; Singer
- Years active: 1928–1973
- Spouses: Elizabeth Veronica (m. 1930; div. 1947) Nina Olivette (m. 1950; died 1971)
- Children: Dean Stockwell; Guy Stockwell

Harry Bayless Stockwell (April 27, 1902 – July 19, 1984) was an American actor and singer.

Stockwell made his film debut in the 1935 musical comedy Here Comes the Band. He achieved wider recognition in 1937 when he provided the voice of the Prince in Walt Disney’s animated film Snow White and the Seven Dwarfs. A noted Broadway performer, Stockwell succeeded Alfred Drake as Curly in Oklahoma! in 1943 and remained in the role until 1948. His final film appearance was in The Werewolf of Washington in 1973.

He was the father of actors Dean Stockwell and Guy Stockwell with his first wife, Elizabeth Veronica. In 1950, he married actress and performer Nina Olivette.

== Biography ==
=== Early life ===
Stockwell was born on April 27, 1902, in Kansas City, Missouri.

=== Career ===
Stockwell made his Broadway debut in 1929 in Broadway Nights. The following year, he appeared in the 1930 edition of Earl Carroll's Vanities. He then began a yearlong run in another musical revue on the Great White Way, As Thousands Cheer.

His first films were Broadway Melody of 1936 and Here Comes the Band. He later provided the voice of the unnamed Prince in Walt Disney’s Snow White and the Seven Dwarfs.

=== Personal life ===
Stockwell married Elizabeth Veronica in 1930; they had two sons, actors Dean Stockwell and Guy Stockwell. The couple divorced in 1947. In 1950, he married actress and performer Nina Olivette, with whom he remained until her death in 1971.

== Death ==
Stockwell died of diabetes (complications from diabetes) in New York City on July 19, 1984, aged 82. He was estranged from his two sons Dean and Guy at the time of his death.

== Filmography ==
External audio
- You may hear Harry Stockwell and Adriana Caselotti performing "I'm Wishing / One Song" in 1937; Here on ucsb.edu
- You may hear Harry Stockwell and the conductor Robert Trendler performing Jerome Kern's "All the Things You Are"; Here on Archive.org

=== Film ===
Year	Title	Role	Notes
1935	Broadway Melody of 1936	'Himself	On-screen singing appearance
1935	Here Comes the Band	'Ollie Watts	Film debut
1937	All Over Town	Don Fletcher	Don Fletcher
1937	Snow White and the Seven Dwarfs	The Prince	Voice role
1945	Montmartre Madness	Himself	Short film
1945	Rhapsody in Blue	Blackface singer	Uncredited
1959	It Happened to Jane	Passenger	Uncredited
1973	The Werewolf of Washington	Military #2	Final film role

=== Stage/Broadway Credits ===
Year	Production	Role	Notes
1929	Broadway Nights	Ensemble / Singer	Broadway debut
1930	The New Yorkers	Ensemble / Specialty Vocalist	Music by Cole Porter
1933	As Thousands Cheer	Various roles	Revue; music by Irving Berlin
1934	Calling All Stars	Performer	Musical revue
1943–1945	Oklahoma!	Curly McLain	Took over the lead role; major stage success
