= Claudia Schiffer =

German model (born 1970)

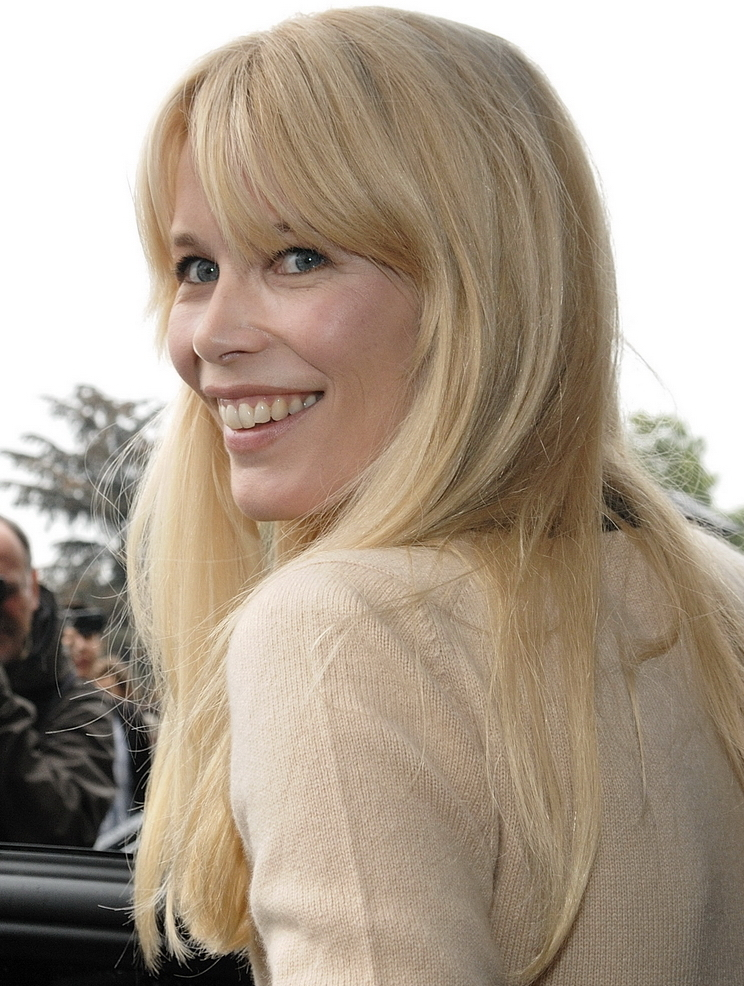
- Schiffer in 2009
- Born: 25 August 1970 (age 56); Rheinberg, North Rhine-Westphalia, West Germany
- Occupations: Model; actress
- Years active: 1989–present
- Spouse: Sir Matthew Vaughn (m. 2002)
- Partner: David Copperfield (1994–1999)
- Children: 3
- Modeling information
- Height: 5 ft 11 in (1.80 m)
- Hair color: Blonde
- Eye color: Blue
- Agency: d'management group (Milan); Model Management (Hamburg)

- Website: claudiaschiffer.com

Claudia Maria Schiffer, Lady Drummond (German: [ˈklaʊdi̯a ˈʃɪfɐ]; born 25 August 1970), is a German model and actress. She rose to fame in the 1990s as a supermodel.

Born in Rheinberg, she initially aspired to join the legal profession, but her life took a turn when she was discovered at 17 in a Düsseldorf nightclub by Michel Levaton, the CEO of Metropolitan Models. This discovery led her to Paris and onto the cover of Elle, marking the start of her modeling career.

Schiffer's breakthrough came with Guess campaigns in 1989. Notably resembling Brigitte Bardot in her early career, she became Chanel's new face in 1990, walking in Karl Lagerfeld's fashion show. She appeared on the covers of Elle, Vogue, Harper's Bazaar, Cosmopolitan and Time, among others. Schiffer appeared on over 1,000 magazine covers and walked for fashion houses. She allegedly charged $20,000 per show in 1992. She holds the record for model with the most covers, listed in Guinness World Records. Her endorsements span luxury and high street brands, including Chanel, Versace, and Mango. Beyond modeling, Schiffer ventured into acting, with roles in films like Richie Rich and Love Actually, and engaged in charity work with UNICEF and Make Poverty History. She launched her own cashmere collection in 2011. In 2023, her net worth was estimated at US$70 million.

Schiffer's personal life attracted significant attention, including her engagement to magician David Copperfield, followed by high-profile relationships and her marriage to film director Matthew Vaughn in 2002.

== Early life ==
Claudia Maria Schiffer was born in Rheinberg, a small town 15 kilometres (9.3 mi) northwest of Duisburg, on 25 August 1970, to mother Gudrun (d. 2020), and father Heinz Schiffer (1937–2007), a lawyer. She has two brothers, Stefan and Andreas, and one sister, Ann Carolin (born 1975). Schiffer is fluent in three languages – German, English and French.

== Career ==
=== Modelling ===
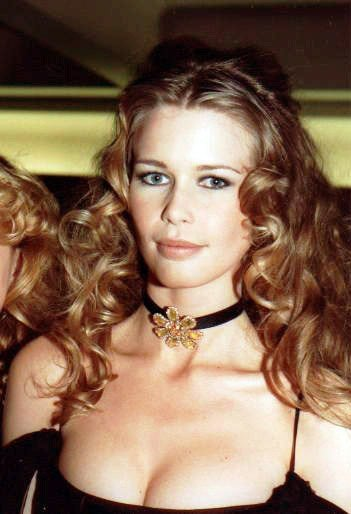
Schiffer in 1993

Schiffer originally aspired to become a lawyer and used to work in her father's law firm. In October 1987, at age 17, she was scouted in a nightclub in Düsseldorf by Michel Levaton, the founder and CEO of the French modeling agency Metropolitan Models, and was later signed to the agency as a model. After leaving high school, Schiffer flew to Paris for a trial photo shoot, and subsequently appeared on the cover of Elle.

In 1989, Schiffer starred in campaigns for Guess. Early on in her career, Schiffer was said to resemble Brigitte Bardot. After several other magazine appearances including the cover of British Vogue, shot by Herb Ritts, Schiffer was selected by Karl Lagerfeld to become the new face of Chanel, where she walked in her first fashion show in January 1990.

In 1992, Schiffer signed an exclusive global contract with Revlon, for an estimated $6 million a year for 10 years; this agreement made her the highest-paid model in history.

In addition to Elle and Vogue, Schiffer has appeared on the covers of numerous other magazines including Harper's Bazaar, Cosmopolitan, and Time, and was the first model to be featured on the covers of Vanity Fair, Rolling Stone, and People. She was one of 10 models on Vogue's 100th anniversary cover in 1992. In May 1997, Schiffer was featured on the cover and in the pictorial of Playboy. She has appeared on a total of more than 1,000 magazine covers.

Schiffer has walked in fashion shows for various fashion houses, including Versace, Karl Lagerfeld, Chloé, Yves Saint Laurent, Christian Dior, Fendi, Michael Kors, Dolce & Gabbana, Ralph Lauren, Balmain, Louis Vuitton, Prada, Anna Sui, Oscar de la Renta, Jil Sander, Donna Karan, Helmut Lang, Thierry Mugler, Chanel and Valentino. In 1992, she was earning a runway fee of $20,000 per show.

She has appeared in advertising campaigns for Chanel, Versace, Balmain, Giorgio Armani, Karl Lagerfeld, Dom Pérignon, Alberta Ferretti, Bulgari, Chloé, Escada, Blumarine, Dolce & Gabbana, Fendi, Max Mara, Louis Vuitton, Michael Kors, Oscar de la Renta, Ralph Lauren, Emporio Armani, Liz Claiborne, Prada, Yves Saint Laurent, Marc Jacobs, Guess, Salvatore Ferragamo, Neiman Marcus, Gap, Dillard's, Saks Fifth Avenue, Revlon, Intergaz and Pepsi. In 1994, she starred in a campaign for Valentino, photographed by Arthur Elgort in Rome, which was inspired by the film La Dolce Vita. In 1997, Schiffer signed an exclusive worldwide contract with L'Oréal. Schiffer still holds a contract with L'Oréal and is one of their longest standing ambassadors.

As well as endorsing luxury brands, Schiffer has appeared as the face of high street retailers including Mango and Accessorize, and had her ears pierced for the first time specially for the 2006 Autumn/Winter Accessorize campaign. From her appearances in a 1998 Citroën advertisement, she allegedly earned £3 million.

In 2012, Schiffer posed for Guess again, marking the brand's 30th anniversary. She made her runway return in September 2023, closing out Versace's Spring 2024 show at Milan Fashion Week.

=== Acting and media ===
Schiffer made her film debut in the children's movie Richie Rich (1994, as the title character's personal fitness trainer). She then starred opposite Dennis Hopper and Matthew Modine in The Blackout (1997), appeared in Friends & Lovers, Black and White (both 1999), In Pursuit, Life Without Dick (both 2001), and Love Actually (2003) in a semi-cameo role. She also made a cameo in Ben Stiller's Zoolander (2001).

Schiffer has appeared on Dharma & Greg and Arrested Development. In 1996, she briefly interviewed celebrities for German television channel RTL 2. She appeared in the music video for Bon Jovi's "Say It Isn't So" in 2000, and in Comic Relief's 2001 charity single, Westlife's cover of "Uptown Girl", playing Christie Brinkley's role in the 1983 Billy Joel video.

Schiffer hosted the French Fashion Awards, and the 1995 World Music Awards in Monaco. She presented trophies with Pelé during the opening ceremonies at the 2006 FIFA World Cup. She also presented Prince William with a polo trophy in 2002. Schiffer was a judge on Fashion Fringe in 2011.

Credited under her married name, Schiffer has executive produced a number of films including Kick-Ass 2 (2013), Kingsman: The Secret Service (2014), Eddie the Eagle (2015), Kingsman: The Golden Circle (2017), Rocketman (2019), Silent Night (2021), The King's Man (2021), Tetris (2023), and Argylle (2024).

=== Fashion design ===
In collaboration with Iris von Arnim, Schiffer launched her eponymous cashmere collection during Paris Fashion Week in March 2011. From 2015, she served as creative director for Claudia Schiffer Made by TSE, another women's cashmere collection.

In 2014, Schiffer partnered with Rodenstock on an eyewear collection featuring sunglasses and optical frames for women.

In 2017 and 2018, Schiffer worked with Aquazzura on two limited-edition "Claudia Schiffer for Aquazzura" footwear capsule collections.

In 2020, Schiffer partnered with numerous fashion and cosmetics brands, including Frame, Bamford and Lucie Kaas, which released special limited edition and one-off pieces in celebration of her 50th birthday.

=== Other business activities ===
Schiffer has released four exercise videos for CBS/Fox, entitled Claudia Schiffer's Perfectly Fit, which reached the best-seller list. Starting in 1992, Schiffer was the star of her own line of annual calendars. Her initial 1992 calendar sold more than 300,000 copies.

Along with fellow models Christy Turlington, Naomi Campbell, and Elle Macpherson, Schiffer became the joint owner of the Fashion Cafe chain of restaurants in 1995.

In 1998, she attended a controversial opening of a stretch of the D1 motorway (Slovakia) near Ilava, having been paid 3.6 million Slovak Koruna (roughly 120,000€), as part of an election campaign of Vladimír Mečiar, then Prime Minister of Slovakia.

Schiffer first partnered with Mattel in 2017, when the toy manufacturer debuted a Versace-clad Claudia Schiffer Barbie doll inspired by a 1994 Vogue Italia photo shoot. Three years later, in celebration of her 50th birthday, Mattel released two more Schiffer Barbies: one wearing the a blue gown, and another dressed in a Balmain design similar to one worn by Schiffer in the label's spring 2016 campaign. In 2024, Mattel released a third Schiffer Barbie.

Also in 2020, Schiffer unveiled her first collaboration with ceramics-maker Bordallo Pinheiro called Cloudy Butterflies, a detailed decorative collection adorned with butterflies in several colors. This was followed in 2023 by an informal dinnerware collection that extended the ceramics range and further developed the butterfly designs. In 2024, she unveiled "Gudrun", a ceramics and porcelain collection adorned with characters and fall flora and fauna.

== Charity work ==
Schiffer began her involvement with UNICEF by becoming a member of the Arts & Entertainment Support Committee, and is currently a UK Goodwill Ambassador for the organisation. She was also a spokeswoman for Make Poverty History, and appeared in their "Click" campaign. In July 2005, she appeared as a presenter at both the Berlin and Edinburgh Live 8 concerts.

== Personal life ==
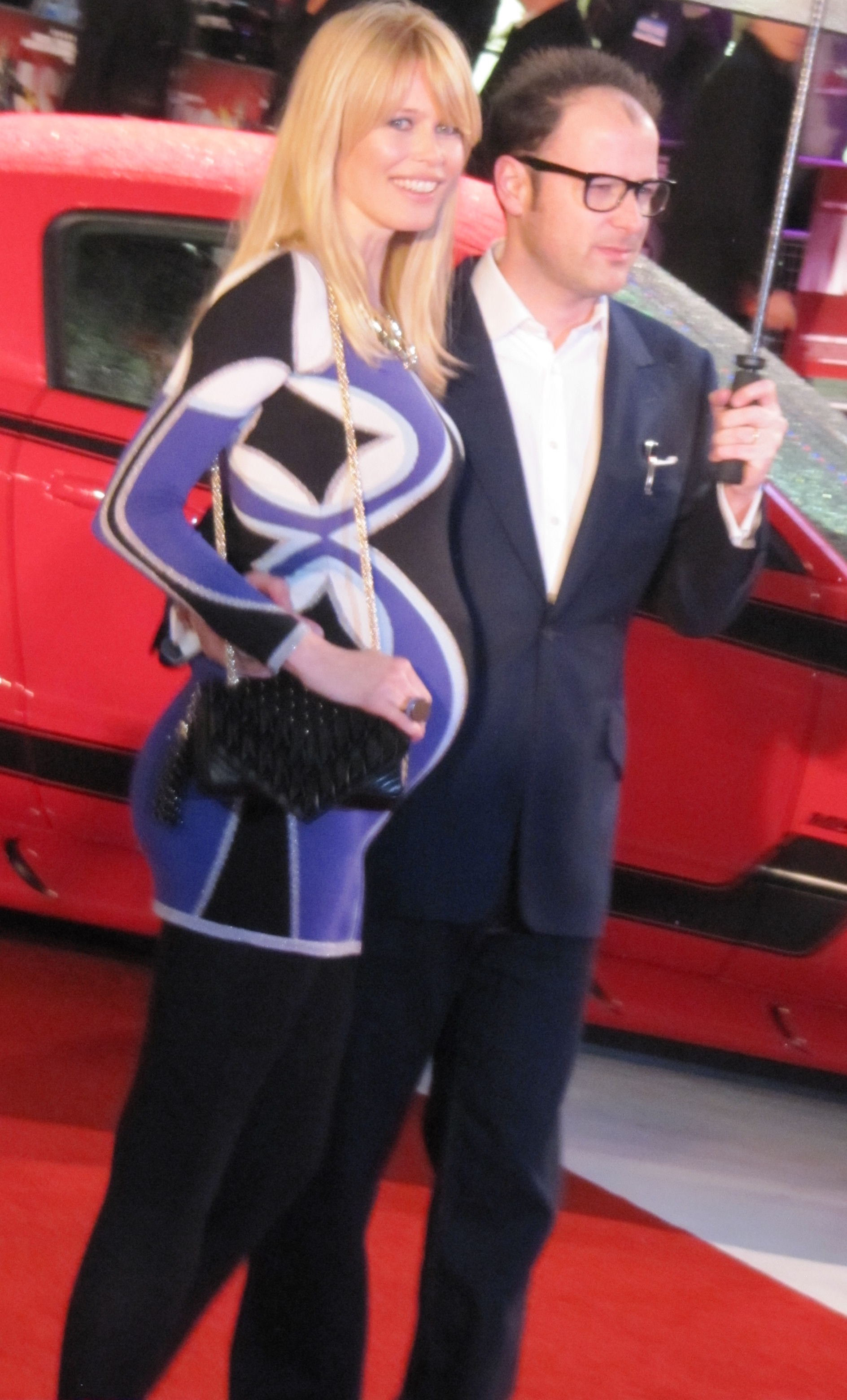
Schiffer with her husband Matthew Vaughn, 2010

In 1993, at a Berlin celebrity gala, Schiffer met the American magician David Copperfield when he brought her on stage to participate in a mind reading act and in his flying illusion, and they became engaged in January 1994. During this engagement, Schiffer sometimes appeared on stage with Copperfield to act as his special guest assistant in illusions. She also appeared in David Copperfield: 15 Years of Magic, a 1994 documentary in which she played the role of a reporter. In September 1999, they announced they had ended their relationship, citing work schedules.

In 1997, Copperfield and Schiffer both sued French magazine Paris Match after claims their relationship was not real. In 1999, a French court ruled that the magazine's story was false, resulting in Paris Match retracting the story. Copperfield's publicist confirmed that while Schiffer had a contract to appear in the audience at Copperfield's show in Berlin where they met, she was not under contract to be his "consort".

Following her break-up with Copperfield, Schiffer dated Green Shield Stamps heir Tim Jefferies until 2000. In 2002, she married English film director Matthew Vaughn in Suffolk. Schiffer and Vaughn have a son and two daughters.

Schiffer and Vaughn live in Stanningfield, Suffolk, where they bought Coldham Hall, a Tudor manor house, in 2002. Vaughn was knighted in 2025, and Schiffer now enjoys the courtesy title of Lady Drummond (Vaughn's legal surname).

In 2002, an Italian kitchen porter was arrested after making nine visits to Coldham Hall. In 2004, a Canadian man was accused of harassing Schiffer, repeatedly leaving letters at her Suffolk home.

The Pandora Papers list Schiffer as one of many celebrities who have used offshore financial constructs.

In December 2025, Schiffer attended the German State Visit to the United Kingdom at Windsor Castle as the guest of German president Frank-Walter Steinmeier.

== Filmography ==
=== Films ===
List of Claudia Schiffer film credits
| Year | Title | Role | Notes |
|---|---|---|---|
| 1994 | Richie Rich | Herself | as an aerobics instructor |
| 1994 | Prêt-à-Porter | Herself | Known in the U.S. as Ready to Wear |
| 1996 | Perfectly Fit | —N/a | Fitness program by Claudia Schiffer |
| 1997 | The Blackout | Susan | |
| 1999 | Desperate But Not Serious | Gigi | Known in the U.S. as Reckless + Wild |
| 1999 | Friends & Lovers | Carla | |
| 1999 | Black and White | Greta | |
| 2000 | Meeting Genevieve | Genevieve | |
| 2000 | Chain of Fools | Herself | |
| 2001 | In Pursuit | Catherine Wells | Known in the U.S. as Rules of the Game |
| 2001 | Zoolander | Herself | |
| 2002 | 666 – Traue keinem, mit dem du schläfst! | Herself | English title 666: In Bed with the Devil |
| 2002 | Life Without Dick | Mary | |
| 2003 | Love Actually | Carol | |

=== Documentaries ===
List of Claudia Schiffer documentary credits
| Year | Documentary |
|---|---|
| 1994 | David Copperfield: 15 Years of Magic |
| 1995 | Die schönsten Frauen der Welt – Claudia Schiffer |
| 1995 | Around Claudia Schiffer |
| 1996 | Catwalk |
| 1997 | Happy Birthday Elizabeth: A Celebration of Life |
| 1998 | Beautopia |
| 2000 | The Sound of Claudia Schiffer |

=== Television ===
List of Claudia Schiffer television credits
| Year | Title | Role | Notes |
|---|---|---|---|
| 1992 | Inferno | | Television film |
| 1999 | Futurama | Claudia Schiffer's Head | Episode: "A Head in the Polls" |
| 2002 | Dharma & Greg | Gretchen | 2 episodes |

=== Music video ===
List of Claudia Schiffer music video credits
| Year | Title | Performer | Album | Ref. |
|---|---|---|---|---|
| 2000 | "Say It Isn't So" | Bon Jovi | Crush | |
| 2001 | "Uptown Girl" | Westlife | World of Our Own | |

== See also ==
- Fashion Cafe
