= Fashion Cafe =

American restaurant chain

- Company type: Private
- Industry: Restaurant
- Founded: 1995; 31 years ago in New York City
- Founders: Francesco Buti; Tommaso Buti
- Headquarters: New York City, New York, United States
- Number of locations: 5
- Areas served: United States, United Kingdom, South Africa, Mexico, Spain
- Key people: Naomi Campbell (spokesmodel); Elle Macpherson (spokesmodel); Claudia Schiffer (spokesmodel); Christy Turlington (spokesmodel)
- Owners: Francesco Buti; Tommaso Buti

Fashion Cafe was an international restaurant chain founded in New York City in 1995, initially fronted by supermodels Naomi Campbell, Elle Macpherson, Claudia Schiffer, and Christy Turlington. Fashion Cafe was founded by Italian-American immigrant brothers Tammasco and Francesco Buti, and it expanded into United Kingdom, South Africa, Mexico, and Spain. Associated Press called it "a couture version of Planet Hollywood and the Hard Rock Cafe."

== History ==
Tammasco Buti moved to New York City from Florence, Italy in 1989, at age 22. He joined friends to create a catering business called Focaccia to serve Wall Street customers, and became a successful service used by corporate clients such as Donna Karan and Merrill Lynch.

The chain first opened in Rockefeller Center, New York City in 1995. On May 6, 1996, construction began on the London branch of the chain, though the London branch went bust in 1999, a year after it opened. At Fashion Cafe openings, many celebrities were seen, including Gianni and Donatella Versace, Tyra Banks, Veronica Webb, Beverly Peele, Eileen Ford, Stephen Baldwin, David Copperfield, the Wayans brothers, Jon Stewart, Matt Lauer, RuPaul, and Molly Ringwald.

Tammasco Buti told New York magazine, "With something like this, you cannot go too deeply into fashion [...] The public is not that educated and not that interested. They want to see more the glamour and the entertainment of fashion."

Tammasco Buti married Daniela Pestova, a Czech model, and lived lavishly in a large penthouse. They divorced later in the 1990s.

=== Legal issues ===
In 1998, tax agents issued warrants for months of unpaid taxes, and Fashion Cafe closed later that year. In addition, Tammasco Buti's business partners sued him for about $15 million. That year, Donald Trump hired Buti to lead his upcoming modeling agency, Trump Model Management, and told New York magazine "I've made $5 billion because I bank on the right people [...] and I think he's a terrific, unjustly accused guy. Restaurants, with all the unions and hamburgers you got to deal with, are not for him. But Tommaso loves women and women love him back. He's a natural to run a modeling agency."

In December 2000, the United States Attorney's Office indicted Tammasco and Francesco Buti on 51 counts, including federal charges of conspiracy, fraud and money laundering. The Butis used money from investors to fund their lavish personal lifestyles, and falsely claimed to have themselves invested millions of dollars into Fashion Cafe. They were arrested in Milan.

On January 19, 2021, Tommaso Buti was granted a full pardon by President Donald Trump before being tried on any charges.

== Specifications ==
The Fashion Cafe's facade was shiny and merchandised, resembled more of a souvenir gift shop than an eatery with a large steel nameplate and passerby-friendly glass window panes.
