= Beeson Carroll =

American film, stage and television actor

- Carroll (left) with Loretta Swit in M*A*S*H, 1977
- Born: Beeson John Carroll; September 21, 1934; New York, U.S.
- Died: March 15, 2018 (aged 83)
- Occupations: Film, stage and television actor

Beeson John Carroll (September 21, 1934 – March 15, 2018) was an American film, stage and television actor.

== Life and career ==
Carroll was born in New York. He began his stage career in the 1960s, and in 1963, he appeared in the stage play Paw Paw Patch. During his stage career, he starred as Blue Morphan, an aged desert rat who lives in an old Chevrolet, in the stage play The Unseen Hand, and he starred in a season-opening stage play at the Just Us Theater. He then began his screen career in 1964, appearing in the CBS drama television series The Reporter. In 1966, he played a policeman in the film Mister Buddwing.

Later in his career, in 1980, Carroll starred as W.D. Hall, the town's grocer, in the CBS drama television series Palmerstown, U.S.A., starring along with Jonelle Allen, Bill Duke and Michael J. Fox. He guest-starred in television programs including M*A*S*H, The Waltons, One Life to Live, Hill Street Blues, Another World, One Day at a Time and Maude, and played the recurring role of Howard McCullogh, the brother of Ed McCullogh (Laurence Haddon), in the syndicated soap opera television series Mary Hartman, Mary Hartman. He also appeared in films such as Bananas, The Werewolf of Washington, Coming Home, Spacehunter: Adventures in the Forbidden Zone, Bound for Glory and Crimes of the Heart.

Carroll retired from acting in 2006, last appearing in the film Diggers.

== Death ==
Carroll died on March 15, 2018, at the age of 83.
