= Citizen Soldier (film) =

- DVD cover for 'Citizen Soldier'
- Directed by: Michael Elsey
- Written by: Michael Elsey
- Produced by: Dennis Elsey
- Starring: Dean Stockwell; Toni Basil; Bill Gray
- Distributed by: Troma Entertainment
- Release date: 1976
- Running time: 88 minutes
- Language: English

Citizen Soldier is a 1976 drama film written and directed by Michael Elsey and starring Dean Stockwell. The film follows a suicidal Vietnam War veteran who finds happiness in a relationship with a young actress. It was distributed by Troma Entertainment. It was re-released in 1982 as a videocassette and again in 1984.
