= Dean Stockwell =

American actor (1936–2021)

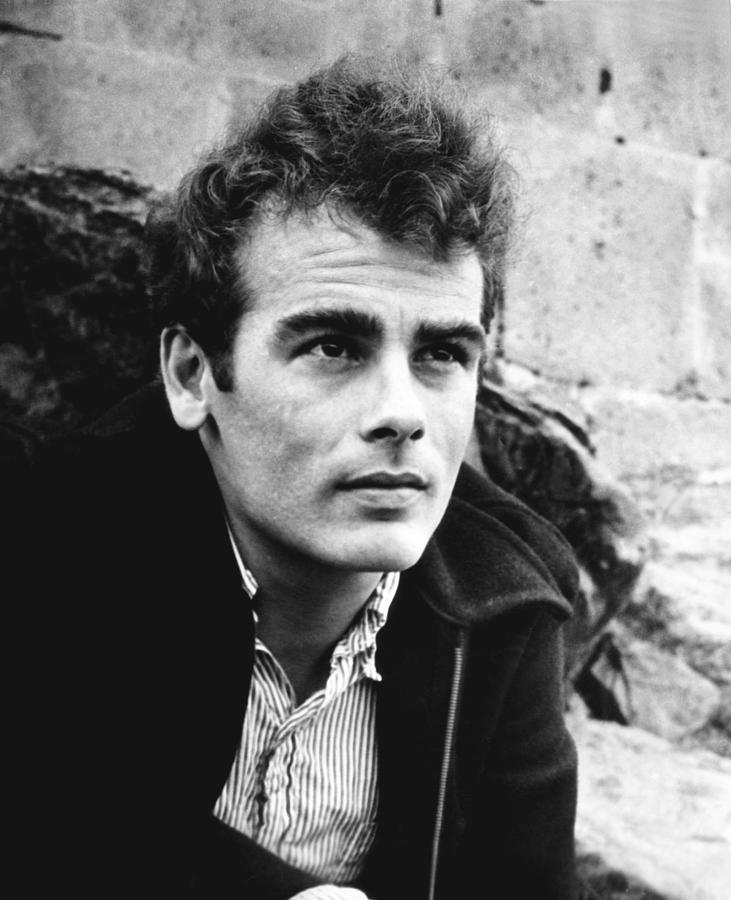
- Stockwell in 1965
- Born: Robert Dean Stockwell; March 5, 1936; Los Angeles, California, U.S.
- Died: November 7, 2021 (aged 85); Whangārei, New Zealand
- Occupation: Actor
- Years active: 1945–2015
- Spouses: Millie Perkins (m. 1960; div. 1962); Joy Marchenko (m. 1981; div. 2004)
- Children: 2
- Father: Harry Stockwell
- Relatives: Guy Stockwell (brother)
- Awards: See list

Robert Dean Stockwell (March 5, 1936 – November 7, 2021) was an American actor and collage artist, whose career in film and television spanned 70 years. As a child actor under contract to Metro-Goldwyn-Mayer, he appeared in Anchors Aweigh (1945), Song of the Thin Man (1947), The Green Years (1946), Gentleman's Agreement (1947), The Boy with Green Hair (1948), The Secret Garden (1949), and Kim (1950). As a young adult, he played a lead role in the 1957 Broadway play Compulsion and its 1959 film version; and in 1962, he played Edmund Tyrone in the film version of Long Day's Journey into Night, for which he won two Best Actor Awards at the Cannes Film Festival. He was nominated for a Golden Globe Award for Best Actor – Motion Picture Drama for his starring role in the 1960 film version of D. H. Lawrence's Sons and Lovers.

He had lead roles in the films The Dunwich Horror (1970) and The Werewolf of Washington (1973). He appeared in supporting roles in such films as Dune (1984), Paris, Texas (1984), To Live and Die in L.A. (1985), Blue Velvet (1986), Beverly Hills Cop II (1987), and Tucker: The Man and His Dream (1988). He received further critical acclaim for his performance in Married to the Mob (1988), for which he was nominated for the Academy Award for Best Supporting Actor. He subsequently had roles in The Player (1992), Air Force One (1997), The Rainmaker (1997), Batman Beyond: Return of the Joker (2000), and The Manchurian Candidate (2004).

His television roles include Rear Admiral Albert "Al" Calavicci in Quantum Leap (1989–1993), Navy Secretary Edward Sheffield on JAG (2002–2004), and Brother Cavil on Battlestar Galactica (2004–2009). Following his roles on Quantum Leap and Battlestar Galactica, he appeared at numerous fan conventions. He retired from acting in 2015 due to health issues and focused on his sculpture and other visual art.

== Biography ==
=== 1936–1951: Early life and career beginnings ===
Stockwell was born into a family of entertainers in the North Hollywood section of Los Angeles, and grew up between there and New York City. He was the younger son of Italian American Elizabeth "Betty" (Veronica) Stockwell, a vaudeville actress, and Harry Stockwell, an actor and lyric baritone singer. His father appeared in the New York productions of Carousel and Oklahoma!, and was the voice of the Prince in Disney's 1937 animated feature film Snow White and the Seven Dwarfs. His elder brother was television and film actor Guy Stockwell. His stepmother, Nina Olivette, was an actress, comedian, singer, and toe dancer in burlesque and theater in New York and throughout North America. His mother's family was Italian.

Stockwell's father was appearing on Broadway in Oklahoma! when he heard about a play, Innocent Voyage by Paul Osborne, that was looking for child actors. Stockwell's mother took their two sons down to audition, and both boys were successful. Stockwell's part was small and the play had only a short run, but it led to a contract with Metro-Goldwyn-Mayer (MGM).

The studio cast him in a small role in The Valley of Decision (1945), a popular melodrama. Producer Joe Pasternak gave him a bigger part in Anchors Aweigh (1945) with Frank Sinatra and Gene Kelly, where he played the nephew of Kathryn Grayson.

The film was popular, and MGM gave him a key role in The Green Years (1946) as Robert Shannon, an Irish Catholic orphan who grows up in a Scottish Presbyterian household. It was a huge hit. He also made a brief appearance in the MGM school room during the chase sequence of Abbott and Costello in Hollywood (1945).

20th Century Fox borrowed him for Home Sweet Homicide (1946) with Peggy Ann Garner, where he was billed fourth. He co-starred with Wallace Beery in The Mighty McGurk (1947) at MGM, a remake of The Champ (1931), which Beery had made previously with Jackie Cooper. He also had the lead in the short A Really Important Person (1947).

He had supporting roles in The Arnelo Affair (1947), The Romance of Rosy Ridge (1947) (as Janet Leigh's brother), and Song of the Thin Man (1947), billed fourth as the son of William Powell and Myrna Loy's characters. He later said, "I have very positive feelings regarding both of them, they were very sweet people, especially Myrna Loy. And that cute little dog, Asta. I liked that little dog."

Nevertheless, Stockwell found being a child actor difficult overall, stating, "I didn't enjoy acting particularly, when I was young. I thought it was a lot of work. There were a few films that I enjoyed, they were comedies, they were not important films, weren't very successful, so I was always pretty much known as a serious kid. I got those kind of roles and I didn't care for them very much." He found that this work meant he did not have any friends except his brother, and he was constantly working, with only one holiday in nine years. He said it was "a miserable way to bring up a child, though neither my parents nor I recognised it at the time".

Fox borrowed him again to play Gregory Peck's son in Gentleman's Agreement (1947), a film which Stockwell "didn't like doing at all, because it was so serious. In other words, when I would find out I was going to do another movie, my mother would always bring that news to me, and the first question that I would always ask was, 'Is there a crying scene in the movie?' And there almost always was."

He played an orphaned runaway longing to go to sea in Deep Waters (1948). He was then borrowed by RKO Pictures to play the title role in The Boy with Green Hair (1948) directed by Joseph Losey, a notorious flop for the Dore Schary regime. Stockwell said that "during the production, I did feel that I was part of something that meant something to me, it was important."

Back at Fox, he was cast as Lionel Barrymore's grandson and Richard Widmark's protégé in Down to the Sea in Ships (1949), before supporting Margaret O'Brien at MGM in The Secret Garden (1949), a box-office disappointment. Stockwell later described the picture as "More crying scenes! And temper tantrums! But I enjoyed very much working with Margaret, she was a very talented little actress."

In MGM's popular Stars in My Crown (1950), which he did not enjoy doing, he was billed third after Joel McCrea and Ellen Drew.

Stockwell was top billed in The Happy Years, which lost a considerable amount of money for the studio, but then played the title role in Kim (1950) alongside Errol Flynn and Paul Lukas, a big commercial success. During its filming, Flynn played a prank on him in a scene where he was supposed to hand him a bowl of food, instead handing him a bowl of camel dung.

In 1951, Stockwell had a lead role with Joel McCrea in a Western at Universal, Cattle Drive.

=== 1952–1968: Adult career and hiatus ===
Stockwell graduated from Alexander Hamilton High School in Los Angeles, and attended the University of California, Berkeley, for a year before dropping out. "I was unhappy and could not get along with people," he later said. At UC Berkeley, he immersed himself in music and wrote several small compositions.

He took a number of years off and resumed his acting career as an adult in 1956. He guest-starred on shows such as Front Row Center, Matinee Theatre, Schlitz Playhouse, The United States Steel Hour, Climax!, Men of Annapolis, Cimarron City, General Electric Theater, and Wagon Train (in 1957 as Jimmy Drew, brother to Shelley Winters in "The Ruth Owens Story", also in 1958, as Juan Ortega in "The Juan Ortega Story", and again in 1959, as Rodney Lawrence in "The Rodney Lawrence Story"). He had a supporting role in a Western, Gun for a Coward (1957), and the lead role in a low-budget teen melodrama, The Careless Years (1957), the feature directorial debut of Arthur Hiller. It was made for Bryna Productions, Kirk Douglas' company. He signed a five-year deal with the company, but this was the only film he made for them.

In 1957, he starred as Judd Steiner in the Broadway adaptation of Compulsion, based on the Leopold and Loeb story. He reprised the role in the 1959 film version, for which co-stars Orson Welles, Bradford Dillman, and he shared the 1959 Cannes Film Award for Best Actor. Stockwell continued to work heavily in TV on such shows as Playhouse 90, Johnny Staccato, and Buick-Electra Playhouse.

Stockwell married actress Millie Perkins on April 15, 1960. That year, he played coalminer Walter Morel's son Paul Morel in the British film Sons and Lovers, with Trevor Howard and Wendy Hiller. He later called it "a very delightful film to do". He continued to work mostly on television, including episodes of Checkmate, The DuPont Show with June Allyson, Outlaws, Alfred Hitchcock Presents, Hallmark Hall of Fame ("The Joke and the Valley"), Bus Stop, The Twilight Zone ("A Quality of Mercy"), Alcoa Premiere, The Alfred Hitchcock Hour, and The Dick Powell Theatre. He appeared with Millie Perkins on Wagon Train as the lead character in the episode "The Will Santee Story".

In 1962, Stockwell and Perkins divorced. He appeared in an adaptation of Eugene O'Neill's play Long Day's Journey into Night with Katharine Hepburn, Ralph Richardson, and Jason Robards, under the direction of Sidney Lumet. He later called it "as intense and rewarding an experience as I've had." He subsequently guest-starred on Combat!, The Greatest Show on Earth, The Defenders, The Eleventh Hour, Kraft Suspense Theatre, and Burke's Law, and had a six-episode arc on Dr. Kildare; he had a supporting part in the feature Rapture (1965).

In the mid-1960s, Stockwell dropped out of show business, becoming active in the Topanga Canyon hippie subculture as a close friend of visual artists George Herms and Wallace Berman, fellow child actor and "dropout" Russ Tamblyn, and musician Neil Young. "I did some drugs and went to some love-ins," he later said. "The experience of those days provided me with a huge, panoramic view of my existence that I didn't have before. I have no regrets." Stockwell once said, "The flower children and the love-ins … were the childhood I didn’t have."

=== 1968–1983: Return to acting ===
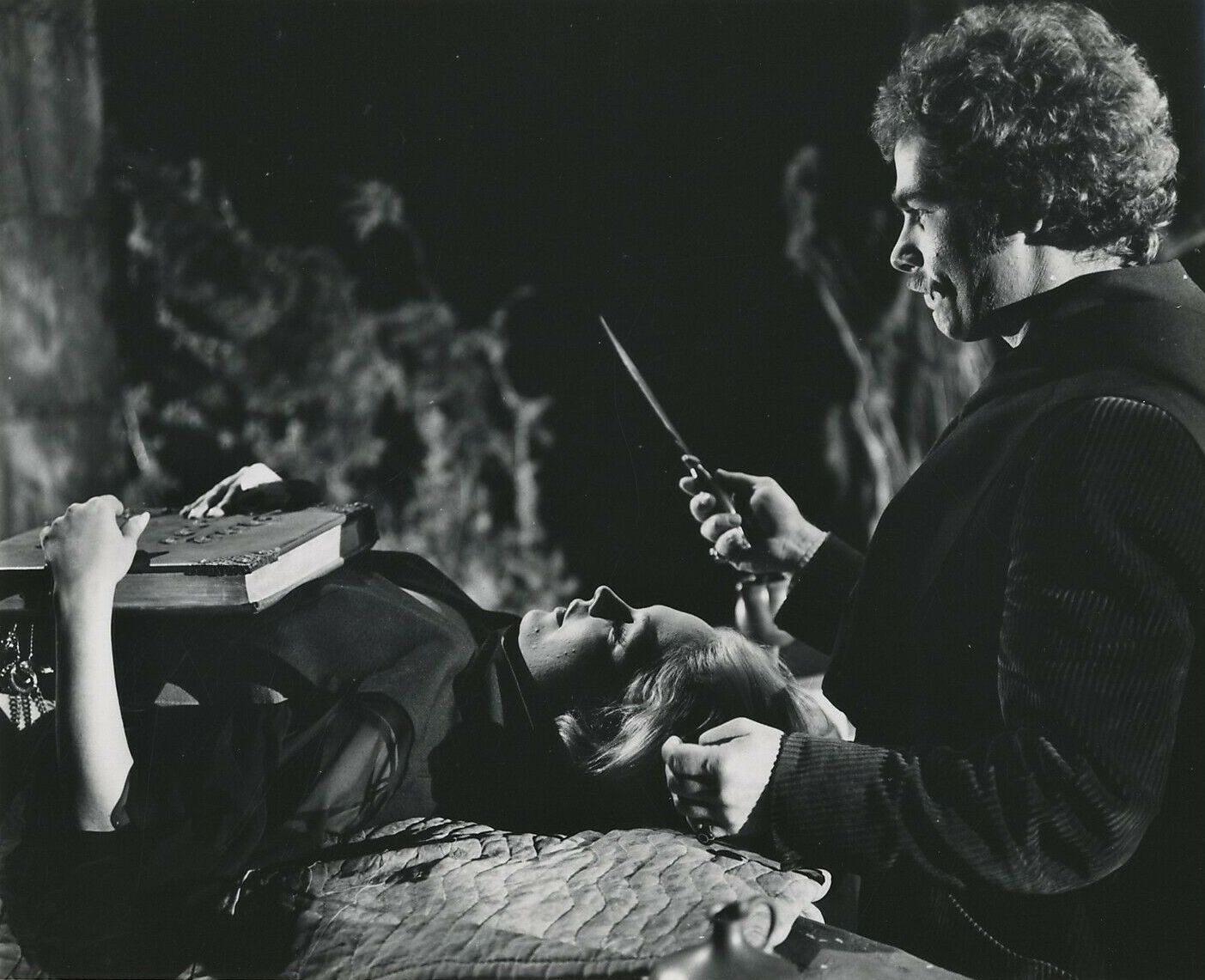
Stockwell with Sandra Dee in The Dunwich Horror (1970)

Stockwell returned to acting with a supporting role in Psych-Out (1968) co-starring Susan Strasberg and Jack Nicholson. He guest-starred on Thirty-Minute Theatre in Britain, The F.B.I., and Bonanza, and played the lead in AIP's The Dunwich Horror (1970) with Sandra Dee.

He also had a key part in Dennis Hopper's The Last Movie (1971). In 1985, Stockwell said this film "is a great picture. It was ahead of its time then – and it still is ... it will gain respect over the years. Dennis Hopper is a marvelous director."

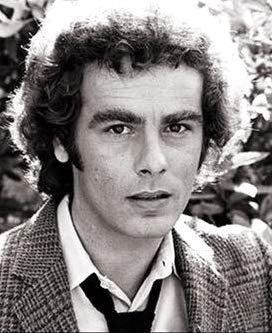
Stockwell in Paper Man

Stockwell guest-starred on Mannix, The F.B.I. (again), Night Gallery, Orson Welles' Great Mysteries, and Mission: Impossible and had the lead in some TV movies, Paper Man (1971) and The Failing of Raymond (1971), as well as a support part in The Adventures of Nick Carter (1972).

Stockwell had the lead in a biker movie, The Loners (1972), Sam Katzman's last film, which Stockwell called "a mess", and horror comedy The Werewolf of Washington (1973), the script for which he said "had a brilliant edge to it. It was satirical, political, funny, witty and wonderful", but the director ruined it, according to Stockwell.

During the mid-1970s, he designed the distinctive cover of Neil Young's album American Stars 'n Bars (1976).

He continued to guest for TV shows such as Police Surgeon, The Streets of San Francisco, Columbo, Joe Forrester, Three for the Road, Cannon, Ellery Queen, Police Story, McCloud, Quinn Martin's Tales of the Unexpected, Greatest Heroes of the Bible, Hart to Hart, The A-Team, and Simon & Simon.

He appeared in the occasional feature such as The Pacific Connection (1974), Win, Place or Steal (1974), Won Ton Ton: The Dog Who Saved Hollywood (1976), Tracks (1976) with Dennis Hopper, One Away (1976), A Killing Affair (1977), She Came to the Valley (1979), Born to Be Sold (1981), and Wrong Is Right (1982).

On December 15, 1981, Stockwell married his second wife, Joy Marchenko, a textiles expert who worked in Morocco. The following year, Stockwell and Neil Young together directed and appeared in Human Highway (1982). He starred in Alsino and the Condor, a Nicaraguan film, and To Kill a Stranger (1983). By this time, Stockwell had moved to Taos, New Mexico, and was depressed about the state of his career, turning to real estate to pay the bills. On November 5, 1983, his wife gave birth to their son, Austin.

=== 1984–1989: Mainstream comeback and critical success ===
In 1984, he appeared in Wim Wenders's critically acclaimed film Paris, Texas, and in the same year, in David Lynch's film version of Dune as Wellington Yueh. In between, he appeared in Fox Mystery Theater. Stockwell later said "After Paris, Texas and Dune, I think I've got a pretty good start on what amounts to a third career." Also in 1984, Dean lost his father Harry Stockwell due to diabetes. His father and he were estranged from each other at the time.

Between 1985 and 1988, he was a busy character actor, appearing in 14 films and one telefilm. In 1985, he turned in a brief but significant role as attorney Bob Grimes in William Friedkin's To Live and Die in L.A.. He was also in The Legend of Billie Jean (1985), an episode of Miami Vice, and Papa Was a Preacher (1986). Stockwell's second child with wife Marchenko, Sophia, was born on August 5, 1985.

In 1986, Stockwell made an appearance in another Lynch production, the neo-noir thriller Blue Velvet. His performance of "In Dreams" in the film is widely considered one of its most iconic scenes, though he was actually lip-syncing to Roy Orbison's original track. He was in episodes of Hunter and Murder, She Wrote, and the films Gardens of Stone (1987) (directed by Francis Ford Coppola), Beverly Hills Cop II (1987), Kenny Rogers as The Gambler, Part III: The Legend Continues (1987), The Time Guardian (1987), Banzai Runner (1987), and The Blue Iguana (1987).

In 1988, he was nominated for an Academy Award for Best Supporting Actor for his performance as Mafia boss Tony "the Tiger" Russo in the comedy Married to the Mob. Stockwell later called it "the favorite part I've ever had in a film. I just felt that that part was just perfect for me and I had a way to approach it that I thought was just right and it turned out that way." Jonathan Demme, who directed the film, said that what made Stockwell special was that he was a "chameleon" and had a "mercurial presence."

He also had roles in Tucker: The Man and His Dream (1988) from Coppola, Smokescreen (1988), the Brazilian The Long Haul (1989), the reboot of The Twilight Zone, Buying Time (1989), and Limit Up (1989).

=== 1989–1999: Television roles ===
In 1989, Stockwell appeared as second lead in the show Quantum Leap, which ran for five seasons. During the series' run, Stockwell appeared in Catchfire (1990) directed by Hopper, Citizen Soldier (1990, originally shot in 1976), Sandino (1991), Son of the Morning Star (1992), The Player (1992), Shame (1992), Captain Planet and the Planeteers voiced Duke Nukem (1990–92), Friends and Enemies (1992), and Fatal Memories (1992).

Following the end of Quantum Leap, Stockwell appeared in Bonanza: The Return (1993), Caught in the Act (1993), In the Line of Duty: The Price of Vengeance (1994), Chasers (1994), Vanishing Son II (1994), Justice in a Small Town (1994), The Innocent (1994), Madonna: Innocence Lost (1994), Deadline for Murder: From the Files of Edna Buchanan (1995), and The Langoliers (1995).

He tried another regular series, Street Gear (1995), but it only lasted 13 episodes. Stockwell was in episodes of Snowy River: The McGregor Saga, Nowhere Man, The Commish, Can't Hurry Love, and Ink.

He had roles in the comedy Mr. Wrong (1996), Naked Souls (1996), Twilight Man (1996), Unabomber: The True Story (1996), Last Resort (1996), Close to Danger (1997), Living in Peril (1997), McHale's Navy (1997), Midnight Blue (1997), Air Force One (1997), The Shadow Men (1997), The Rainmaker (1997), and Sinbad: The Battle of the Dark Knights (1998).

Stockwell had a regular role on The Tony Danza Show (1998), which only ran 14 episodes.

He was in Restraining Order (1999), Water Damage (1999), The Venice Project (1999), Rites of Passage (1999), What Katy Did (1999), and Phenomenon: The Lost Archives (1999).

=== 2000–2017: Later career ===
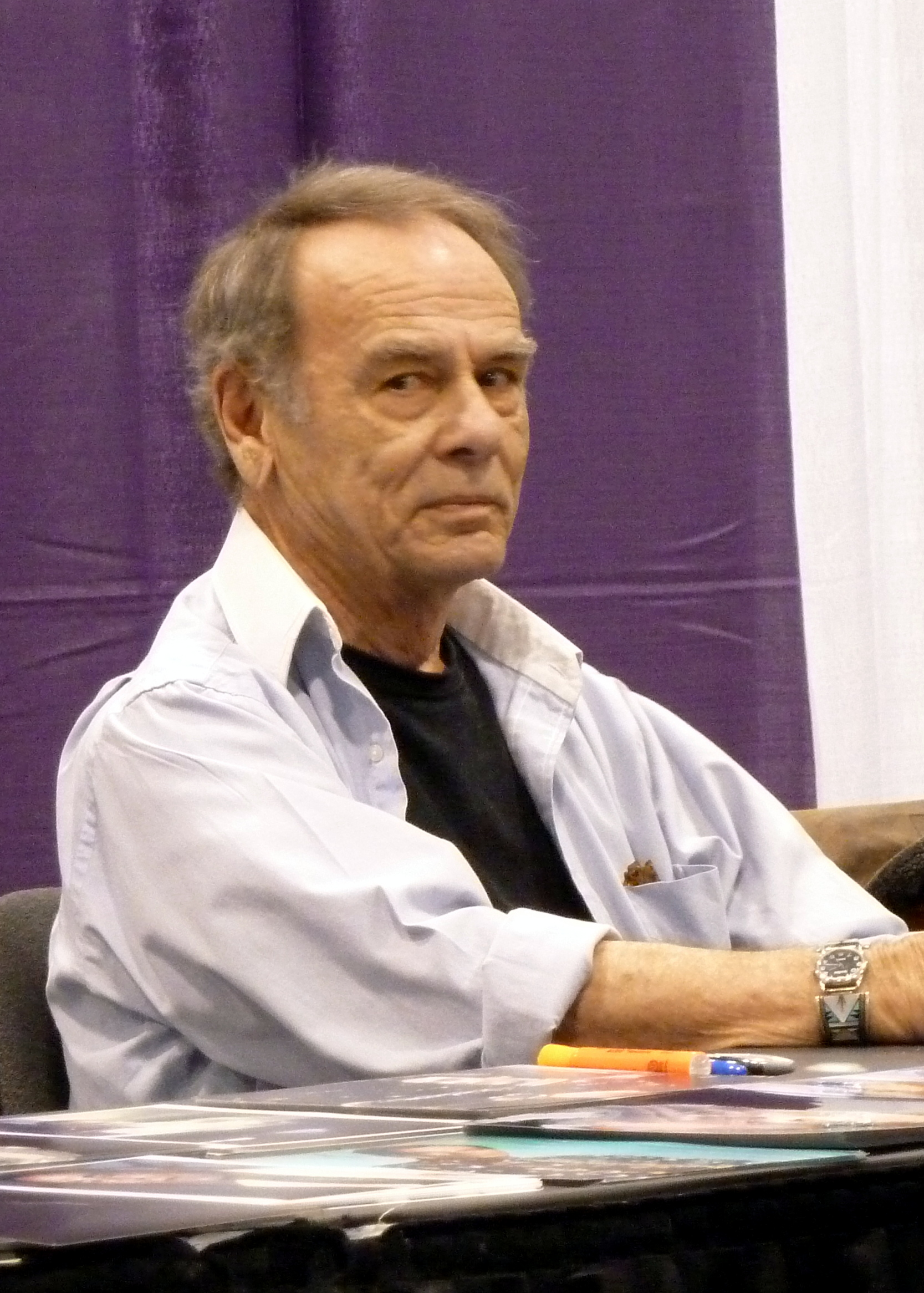
Stockwell at Wizard World Toronto in 2012.

Stockwell's performances in the 2000s included They Nest (2000), In Pursuit (2000), Batman Beyond: Return of the Joker (2000), The Flunky (2000), Italian Ties (2001), CQ (2001) directed by Coppola's son Roman, The Quickie (2001), Buffalo Soldiers (2001), Inferno (2002), The Manchurian Candidate (2004), The Deal (2007), and The Nanny Express (2008).

He guest-starred on First Monday, Enterprise (reunited with Scott Bakula from Quantum Leap), Stargate SG-1, JAG, and Crash with Hopper. He had a semiregular part on Battlestar Galactica from 2006 as John Cavil.

He made a minor appearance in a new 2009 adaptation of The Dunwich Horror, followed by roles in the films C.O.G. (2013), Max Rose (2013), Deep in the Darkness (2014), and Persecuted (2014). As of 2015, Stockwell remained a resident of Taos. He reunited with Bakula in a 2014 episode of NCIS: New Orleans, titled "Chasing Ghosts", and the following year appeared in the film Entertainment.

Stockwell lived in Taos, New Mexico, late in life, and exhibited some of his art there in 2009.

In January 2017, his ex-wife Joy reported that he had suffered and recovered from a stroke in 2015 and was retired from acting.

== Political activism ==
Stockwell was an "avowed environmentalist". He campaigned for the Democratic Party in the 1992 U.S. presidential election.

== Death ==
Stockwell died of natural causes in Whangārei in New Zealand, where his daughter lived, on November 7, 2021, at the age of 85.

== Credits and accolades ==
- List of Dean Stockwell performances
- List of awards and nominations received by Dean Stockwell
