= Cattle Drive =

1951 film by Kurt Neumann

- Theatrical release poster
- Directed by: Kurt Neumann
- Written by: Lillie Hayward; Jack Natteford
- Produced by: Aaron Rosenberg
- Starring: Joel McCrea; Dean Stockwell; Chill Wills; Leon Ames; Bob Steele
- Cinematography: Maury Gertsman
- Edited by: Danny B. Landres
- Color process: Technicolor
- Production company: Universal International Pictures
- Distributed by: Universal Pictures
- Release date: August 1, 1951
- Running time: 77 minutes
- Country: United States
- Language: English

Cattle Drive is a 1951 American Western film directed by Kurt Neumann and starring Joel McCrea, Dean Stockwell and Chill Wills. Much of the film was shot in Death Valley National Park, California and Paria, Utah.

The basic story echoes that of the 1937 film Captains Courageous, adapted from a novel by Rudyard Kipling, although in the desert rather than at sea.

== Plot ==
Chester Graham Jr., the spoiled young son of a wealthy railroad owner, is lost in the middle of nowhere when he wanders away from a train during a water stop. He is found by a cowboy who is driving cattle. Lucky to be alive, Chester accompanies the cowboys and learns the value of hard work, self-discipline and comradeship on the trail to Santa Fe.

== Cast ==
- Joel McCrea as Dan Matthews
- Dean Stockwell as Chester Graham Jr.
- Chill Wills as Dallas
- Leon Ames as Chester Graham Sr.
- Henry Brandon as Jim Currie
- Howard Petrie as Cap
- Bob Steele as Charlie "Careless" Morgan
- Griff Barnett as Conductor O'Hara

== Production ==
Parts of the film were shot in Paria, Utah, and Death Valley.

== See also ==
- Cattle drive
