= In Pursuit =

- Movie Poster
- Directed by: Peter Pistor
- Screenplay by: John Penney
- Story by: Peter Pistor
- Produced by: David Jackson; Gayle Sherman
- Starring: Daniel Baldwin; Claudia Schiffer; Coolio; Dean Stockwell
- Cinematography: Richard Crudo
- Music by: Bruce Miller
- Distributed by: Showcase Entertainment
- Release date: February 27, 2001 (USA)
- Running time: 88 minutes
- Country: United States
- Language: English
- Budget: $3.4 million
- Box office: $9.6 million

In Pursuit is a 2001 American thriller drama film directed by Peter Pistor and written by John Penney, based on a story by Pistor. The film was shot in Encino, California.

== Plot ==
An attorney is accused of murdering a powerful man after having an affair with his beautiful wife.

== Principal cast ==
Actor	Role
Daniel Baldwin	Rick Alvarez
Claudia Schiffer	Catherine Wells
Sarah Lassez	Abby Berkhoff
Coolio	Carl Wright
Cristos	Enrique Machado
Dean Stockwell	Charles Wells
Kim Rhodes	Ann Sutton
