= The Adventures of Nick Carter =

- Genre: Crime
- Created by: Ormond G. Smith; John R. Coryell
- Based on: Nick Carter (character)
- Screenplay by: Ken Pettus
- Directed by: Paul Krasny
- Theme music composer: John Andrew Tartaglia
- Country of origin: United States
- Original language: English
- No. of episodes: 1

Production
- Executive producer: Richard Irving
- Producers: Stanley Kallis; Arthur Hilton
- Production location: Universal City, California
- Editor: Robert F. Shugrue
- Running time: 73 minutes
- Production company: Universal Television

Original release
- Network: ABC
- Release: February 20, 1972

The Adventures of Nick Carter was a television film/ pilot that aired on ABC Feb 20, 1972.

== Plot ==
The film begins with a cold opening that shows a man in a bowler hat chases an elderly man through the streets of turn of the century New York, eventually cornering and shooting him. The opening credits then roll and the audience is introduced to the main character, private detective Nick Carter sparing in a boxing match. He is soon informed by his secretary that his friend and mentor Sam Bates has been murdered. After viewing his body at the morgue Carter tries to determine who killed him, as the police force seems apathetic. His first lead is his friends last employer, Otis Duncan and his two sons, one of whose wives has recently gone missing. Carter is hired to find the missing woman while also investigating Bates death, which leads him through a complex noir style plot that leads him discover crime and corruption.

== Cast ==
- Robert Conrad - Nick Carter
- Brooke Bundy - Roxy O'Rourke
- Shelley Winters - Bess Tucker
- Neville Brand - Captain Dan Keller
- Broderick Crawford - Otis Duncan
- Pernell Roberts - Neal Duncan
- Laraine Stephens - Joyce Jordan
- Dean Stockwell - Freddy Duncan
- Sorrell Booke - Dr. Zimmerman
- Ned Glass - Maxie
- Paul Mantee - O'Hara
- Arlene Martel - Flo
- Jaye P. Morgan - Plush Horse Singer
- Byron Morrow - Sam Bates
