= The Werewolf of Washington =

- DVD cover
- Directed by: Milton Moses Ginsberg
- Written by: Milton Moses Ginsberg
- Produced by: Nina Schulman; Stephen A. Miller
- Starring: Dean Stockwell; Biff McGuire; Clifton James; Michael Dunn
- Cinematography: Robert M. Baldwin
- Edited by: Milton Moses Ginsberg
- Music by: Arnold Freed
- Distributed by: Diplomat
- Release date: February 20, 1973
- Running time: 90 minutes
- Country: United States
- Languages: English; Hungarian

The Werewolf of Washington is a 1973 horror comedy film written and directed by Milton Moses Ginsberg and starring Dean Stockwell. Produced by Nina Schulman, it satirizes several individuals in Richard Nixon's administration and is also a spoof of the Universal Pictures films The Wolf Man and Werewolf of London.

== Plot summary ==
Jack Whittier (Dean Stockwell) is the press secretary for the White House and for the President of the United States. While on assignment in Hungary, he is bitten by a wolf who actually turns out to be a man. When Jack tries to report it, he believes it is the work of Communists. He then meets a Romani woman who tells him it was her son and he needed to die to be saved. She then gives him a charm and tells him to be careful now that he may suffer the same effects.

When he returns to Washington D.C., he is assigned to the President (Biff McGuire); he has also been having an affair with the President's daughter Marion (Jane House). Jack suddenly starts to feel different changes about him whenever the moon is full. Numerous murders suddenly occur all over Washington, all related to the President's staff. Jack is now convinced that he is a werewolf; when he tries to explain this to his superior, Commander Salmon (Beeson Carroll), the latter does not believe him. Jack then presents a pattern of where the murders have happened in the shape of a pentagram; he convinces him (Salmon) to lock him in his apartment and restrain him and also to be documented. The President needs Jack for a special interview with the Chinese prime minister; however, Jack starts to change into a werewolf and he attacks the President.

He then leaves for Marion, who then shoots him with a silver bullet, thus killing him and changing him back to his human form. Many witnesses decide to cover up the act saying Jack bravely came into the line of fire.

In audio over the closing credits, the President addresses the nation. At the very end, he starts to change into a werewolf.

== Cast ==
- Dean Stockwell as Jack Whittier
- Katalin Kallay as Giselle
- Henry Ferrentino as Beal
- Despo Diamantidou as Romani Woman (credited as Gypsy Woman)
- Thayer David as Inspector
- Clifton James as Attorney General
- Biff McGuire as The President
- Michael Dunn as Dr. Kiss
- Nancy Andrews as Mrs. Margie Captree
- James Tolkan as Dark Glasses
- Jacqueline Brookes as Angela
- Jack Waltzer as Appointments Secretary
- Ben Yaffee as Mr. Captree
- Jane House as Marion
- Beeson Carroll as Commander Salmon
- Harry Stockwell as Military #2
- Terry Alexander as Guard

== Release ==
The film was originally released theatrically in the United States by Diplomat in 1973. After it performed underwhelmingly in initial engagements, the title was changed to Werewolf at Midnight, and ads stopped drawing attention to its political themes.

On VHS and DVD, the film has been released by various labels over the years with questionable legitimacy to the rights and subpar presentations. This is because the film is widely thought to be in the public domain as its copyright was not properly registered in the United States. It was also released on DVD by Shout Factory as part of the Elvira's Movie Macabre series, hosted by Elvira, played by Cassandra Peterson.

In 2023, Kino Lorber released the film on blu-ray. The release featured the theatrical cut of the film as well as a director's cut prepared by Ginsberg shortly before his death in 2021.

== See also ==
- List of American films of 1973
