= Sandino (film) =

1990 film directed by Miguel Littín

- Film poster
- Directed by: Miguel Littín
- Starring: Joaquim de Almeida; Kris Kristofferson
- Production companies: Televisión Española; Umamzor
- Release date: 1990
- Running time: 135 minutes
- Countries: Spain; Nicaragua
- Language: Spanish

Sandino is a 1990 Spanish-Nicaraguan biographical film about Nicaraguan revolutionary Augusto César Sandino, directed by Chilean filmmaker Miguel Littín and produced by Spanish Televisión Española and Nicaraguan state producer Umamzor. It was released first in cinemas as a two-hour- long film. Later it was broadcast on television as a miniseries of three 55-minute episodes.

== Plot ==
The film depicts the life of Augusto César Sandino (1895–1934), the leader of the Nicaraguan resistance against the US occupation army between 1927 and 1933, as well as the National Guard that was organized against him after the Marines' defeat.

The movie features several real-life characters, including Calvin Coolidge (President of the United States), Nicaraguan dictator Anastasio Somoza, Salvadoran revolutionary Farabundo Martí, the country's President Juan Bautista Sacasa, Colonel Logan Feland and Captain Gilbert D. Hatfield of the Navy, as well as Blanca Aráuz Pineda, Sandino's wife and a telegraph operator from the town of San Rafael del Norte, Jinotega. Young workers who fought alongside Sandino, such as generals Francisco Estrada, José Gregorio Colindres, and Pedro Altamirano Pedrón, as well as Teresa Villatoro, Sandino's mountain wife, also make appearances.

== Cast ==
- Joaquim de Almeida as Augusto César Sandino
- Kris Kristofferson as Tom Holte
- Dean Stockwell as Captain Hatfield
- Ángela Molina as Teresa Villatoro
- Victoria Abril as Blanca Arauz
- Omero Antonutti as Don Gregorio Sandino
- Blanca Guerra as Rossana
- Ernesto Gómez Cruz as Farabundo Martí
- José Alonso as Anastasio Somoza García
- Fernando Balzaretti as Estrada
