= Paper Man (1971 film) =

- Original network advertisement
- Genre: Drama; Horror; Mystery; Sci-Fi
- Written by: James D. Buchanan; Ronald Austin
- Story by: Anthony Wilson
- Directed by: Walter Grauman
- Starring: Dean Stockwell; Stefanie Powers; James Stacy; Tina Chen; Elliott Street; James Olson
- Music by: Duane Tatro
- Country of origin: United States
- Original language: English

Production
- Producers: Walter Grauman; David Silver; Anthony Wilson
- Cinematography: Jack Woolf
- Editor: John McSweeney Jr.
- Running time: 90 minutes
- Production company: 20th Century Fox Television

Original release
- Release: 12 November 1971

Paper Man is a 1971 American television horror film transmitted as one of the "Friday Night Movies" which CBS-TV was then including in its prime-time programming. It also had a brief theatrical run with a longer version. It was directed by Walter Grauman, and dramatized for television by James D. Buchanan and Ronald Austin, both of whom were working from a story written by Anthony Wilson. It starred Dean Stockwell, Stefanie Powers, James Stacy, James Olson, Elliott Street, and Tina Chen.

== Plot ==
Four college students (Stefanie Powers, James Stacy, Elliott Street, and Tina Chen) take advantage of a credit card mistakenly issued to someone who does not exist by using their university's computer to counterfeit an entire identity and erase the charges they run up on it – done by Avery (Dean Stockwell), a computer wiz to fix everything for them. None of them count on the computer seeming to have some ideas of its own, or on it commencing to murder them.

Ultimately, a man employed at the university (James Olson) proves to have stolen the identity which the students had counterfeited and to have been using it to commit the offenses which the students had blamed on the computer.

Paper Man was produced at a time when identity theft was neither as common a crime, nor as difficult to commit, as it later became.

== Cast ==
- Dean Stockwell as Avery Jensen
- Stefanie Powers as Karen McMillan
- James Stacy as Jerry
- Tina Chen as Lisa
- Elliott Street as Joel Fisher
- James Olson as Art Fletcher
