= Buick-Electra Playhouse =

American TV anthology series (1959–1960)

- Genre: Anthology
- Written by: Ernest Hemingway
- Directed by: John Frankenheimer; Tom Donovan; James Clarke; Albert Marre
- Country of origin: United States
- Original language: English
- No. of seasons: 1
- No. of episodes: 4

Production
- Executive producer: A. E. Hotchner
- Producer: Gordon Duff
- Running time: 72–78 minutes
- Production company: CBS Productions

Original release
- Network: CBS
- Release: November 19, 1959 – May 19, 1960

Buick-Electra Playhouse is a 90-minute dramatic anthology series produced by and aired on CBS from November 19, 1959, until May 19, 1960. It was sponsored by Buick. Four episodes, all based on Ernest Hemingway's works, were broadcast.

"The Killers" was broadcast on November 19, 1959, starring Dean Stockwell, Dane Clark, Robert Middleton, Ray Walston, Diane Baker and Ingemar Johansson. The supporting cast included Fred Scollay and Deborah Moldow. A review of the episode in The New York Times complimented the work of the actors but said, "The adaptation was not successful." The review pointed out the difficulty of developing "a brief but moving narrative" to fill 90 minutes of television time, noting that "most of the incidents that were added to the basic plot were generally ineffective", while "the most absorbing moments ... were those that were pure Hemingway."

Other episodes, their dates, and actors were:

- "The Fifth Column" - January 29, 1960 - Richard Burton, Maximilian Schell, Sally Ann Howes Sydney Pollack
- "The Snows of Kilimanjaro" - March 25, 1960 - Robert Ryan, Ann Todd, Janice Rule
- "The Gambler, The Nun, and the Radio" - May 19, 1960

The executive producer was A.E. Hotchner, the producer was Gordon Duff, and the directors were John Frankenheimer, Tom Donovan, James Clarke, and Albert Marre.

Notable guest stars included Richard Burton, Maximilian Schell, Eleanor Parker, Robert Ryan, Dean Stockwell and Diane Baker.

The title sequences of each episode included a bust of Hemingway that was commissioned by CBS. Sculptor Robert Berks read Hemingway's works and studied films and still photos of the author for two weeks in preparation for creating the bust. A potter in New England used clays imported from around the world to make the clay that Berks molded in his New York studio.
