= David Holzman's Diary =

- Directed by: James McBride
- Written by: James McBride
- Produced by: Michael Wadleigh
- Starring: L. M. Kit Carson
- Cinematography: Michael Wadleigh
- Distributed by: New Yorker Films
- Release date: 1967
- Running time: 73 minutes
- Country: United States
- Language: English
- Budget: $2,500

David Holzman's Diary is a 1967 American mockumentary, or work of metacinema, directed by James McBride and starring L. M. Kit Carson. A feature-length film made on a tiny budget over several days, it is a work of experimental fiction presented as an autobiographical documentary. "A self-portrait by a fictional character in a real place—New York's Upper West Side," the film comments on the title character's personality and life as well as on documentary filmmaking and the medium of cinema more generally. In 1991, David Holzman's Diary was selected for preservation in the National Film Registry of the Library of Congress, being deemed "culturally, historically, or aesthetically significant".

== Synopsis ==
L. M. Kit Carson plays David, a young white man living alone in his modest studio apartment on Manhattan's West 71st Street during July 1967. The film begins without the conventional opening credits or music that would signify a professionally made documentary or fiction film. Instead, it begins with David at home saying plainly that he has recently lost his job and may soon be drafted into the military and sent to Vietnam. He does not identify the job in question, but his apartment décor and cinephile personality imply that it may have involved film. Sitting on a chair with film equipment and posters behind him, and quoting Jean-Luc Godard, he says he has decided to make a video diary to try to document and understand his life. After this introduction, what follows is a series of filmed diary entries that David makes over a period of several days, depicting his daily life, his surroundings, and his most personal thoughts and feelings.

In some scenes, David goes around filming his neighborhood, from various people and historical buildings to spontaneous moments such as police officers helping an apparent robbery victim. This video is sometimes silent and at other times accompanied by dialogue or ambient sound, or sound that he may have taped separately and added to the film later, such as radio broadcasts. David interviews some people and lets others talk freely to the camera. In a scene about one-third of the way into the film, his friend Pepe gives an extended monologue on his critical assessment of the diary as it is shaping up so far, namely that David is making "a very bad work of art." Saying, "Your life is not a very good script," Pepe recommends that David try harder to find what is truly interesting. If he's going to focus on himself—someone who "is not a good character" to watch—then maybe he should take more risks, expose his vulnerabilities—perhaps even try filming himself standing naked in front of the camera, for as long as it takes to find some interesting truths. (Andrew Noren is one underground filmmaker from this time and place who had a lot of such nudity in his films.)

Most often in the film, David sits at home talking to his Lavalier microphone and 16mm Éclair camera about topics important to him, from film theory to his girlfriend Penny, who is a fashion model. Over the several days of making his diary, and maybe following some of Pepe's advice, David becomes increasingly obsessed with filming Penny, without her permission, and even once when she's sleeping in the nude. In that particular moment, she wakes up and attacks him for this transgression, and breaks up with him; this is followed by several failed attempts to contact her, and his monologue praising masturbation. David also repeatedly films through the window of a woman across the street, whom he nicknames Sandra, after the title character in Luchino Visconti's eponymous 1965 film. And, in another scene, he follows an anonymous woman out of the subway and onto the street, quietly stalking her until she turns around and tells him, "Beat it!"

David's diary project hits bottom after he leaves town for a day, to attend a family funeral, and returns to find all of his film equipment stolen. He reveals this in his last diary entry, which combines an audio recording of his voice with a series of photos David made of himself with rented or borrowed equipment. Disappointed and disillusioned, he says that this is the end of the film. The sound then stops and the image goes black for about ten seconds, seemingly the end of this diary film. But then David Holzman's Diary takes a sudden unexpected turn. It displays a title card (still no sound) saying simply "DAVID HOLZMAN'S DIARY," followed by another card identifying L.M. Kit Carson as the actor playing him. Then some cards for the rest of the cast and the crew. The cards effectively acknowledge that the preceding was a work of fiction posing as an autobiographical documentary.

== Cast and crew ==
- David Holzman – L. M. Kit Carson
- Penny Wohl – Eileen Dietz
- Pepe – Lorenzo Mans
- Sandra – Louise Levine
- Woman on the subway – Fern McBride
- Sandra's Boyfriend – Michael Levine
- Max (Penny's agent) – Bob Lesser
- Cop – Jack Baran
- Writer-Director – Jim McBride
- Camera – Michael Wadley (now Wadleigh)
- Additional Photography – Paul Goldsmith and Paul Glickman

== Production ==
Film critic Richard Brody writes that, "This ingenious, scruffy 1967 metafiction by Jim McBride is an exotic fruit grown in New York from the seed of the French New Wave." Jaime Wolf writes that, "At once a fictional narrative within a recognizable documentary setting and a kind of essay on the conditions of filmmaking, David Holzman's Diary stands as one of the few American equivalents to the work which Godard was doing at the time." The French New Wave clearly was an inspiration for this film, but there were others as well. One influence was The Diary of a Lost Girl, a book published in 1905 as a supposedly authentic diary of a prostitute named Thymian, but actually written by its "editor," Margarete Böhme; it was later adapted into a popular 1929 German film starring Louise Brooks as Lulu. This is what David refers to in the beginning of his film when he cites "the famous Lulu's diary" as an inspiration for his work. Jaime N. Christley notes some other cinematic influences, saying that, "the real point of origin is either Peter Watkins's docudrama The War Game (which won the documentary Oscar for 1967) or Luis Buñuel's Land Without Bread, depending on where you draw the fault lines." James McBride identified his more immediate American context for making the film:

I entered the world of movies when cinema vérité work like the Maysles brothers' and Richard Leacock's and D. A. Pennebaker's was new and exciting, and when a lot of underground filmmakers were trying to use the medium in a more poetic way, as an exercise in different kinds of liberation—you know, from personal liberation to liberation from the classical forms of filmmaking. So there were a lot of alternatives to Hollywood moviemaking then. These movies were all trying to find a new way of looking at life. And I was a young, idealistic filmmaker dealing with these same questions. You know: what is one supposed to be trying to do in the movies and how ought one go about doing it? My film, David Holzman's Diary, was about this guy who makes a diary of his own life to try to find some truth that he can't perceive in real time. It was meant to be kind of an ironical formula, let's say, to explore a lot of those ideas.

David Holzman's Diary was filmed in about a week with borrowed equipment and a mere $2,500 budget. According to L.M. Kit Carson, the money came from a book advance from The Museum of Modern Art, intended for him and McBride to research and write a book on cinema verité. After conducting several filmmaker interviews, they changed their minds and decided to do something better with the money:

Halfway through the book-writing, McBride says to me: "There is no Truth on Film. Basically as soon as you turn the camera on – everything changes – to not real – gets like unreal." So we decide it's more quote/unquote "un-truth-ful" to write this book – we decide not to write this book. We take the $2,500.00 book-advance – and over the 10-day Easter Break from college – we make a cinema-verite mock-documentary – we figure it's the strongest way to question cinema-verite: David Holzman's Diary.

David Holzman's Diary exemplifies guerrilla filmmaking, a mode of production defined not by genre but by a drastic lack of production resources along with a by-any-means-necessary mindset. The needed resources include money, equipment, facilities, and professional cast and crew; lacking them requires filmmakers to be very economical and creative, as with McBride and Carson's use of the $2,500 MoMA book money. Or with the writing of the film's dialogue. Film critic Jonathan Rosenbaum says the dialogue in David Holzman's Diary "was basically written (when it was written) on a scene by scene basis" with the actors involved. Other scenes were completely impromptu, such as the one with "the frank sexual talk from the lady in the Thunderbird–actually a transsexual who'd recently undergone a sex-change operation." David B. Lee describes this woman as actually a "pre-op transsexual," and more importantly notes that this is the only woman in the film who isn't victimized by David's camera; who instead openly engages with it, cracking bawdy jokes and even explicitly soliciting sex.

Earlier in the 1960s, McBride had attended NYU's film school, in the same class as Martin Scorsese. "When he was doing Who's That Knocking at My Door and I was doing David Holzman's Diary, we were both working with the same cinematographer, Michael Wadleigh." It turns out that Wadleigh was key to making David Holzman's Diary, and not simply as its cinematographer. According to McBride, Wadleigh was doing commercial work at the time, and took creative advantage of that situation to get resources for their film:

It's kind of a complicated process, but we would go out and shoot something for somebody and if he had to shoot something on the following Monday, say, we'd keep the equipment over the weekend. So Mike's idea was, this movie you want to make, why don't we just use this free equipment we have on the weekends and shoot stuff. So that's what we did. We used leftover film stock. To process the film we would go to the lab under the aegis of some other project we were working on.

The choice of the Upper West Side location for the film came from McBride's own life experience: "I was born and raised there and I still lived there, not with my parents but I still lived in the neighborhood long after I left home and so these were the streets that I walked, these were the things that I saw. [It] was kind of my world and I wanted to share a little bit."

== Distribution ==
A highly unconventional film made completely outside the studio system, David Holzman's Diary was not distributed theatrically. However, it had early successes at film festivals, cinema clubs, and museums. It screened at the New York Film Festival and the San Francisco Film Festival, and won awards at the Mannheim, Brussels, and Pesaro film festivals. It screened in 1968 at the Flaherty Seminar and the Museum of Modern Art, and in 1973 at the Whitney Museum of American Art. Regarding the MoMA screening, L. M. Kit Carson said the museum, "was not happy that we did not make the contracted book," until the film won awards at festivals. "Then the Museum arranged for a high-profile Special Screening of the mock-doc – the beginning of a film-series called CINEPROBE" and then added the film to its collection.

In 1991, David Holzman's Diary was selected for preservation in the U.S. National Film Registry by the Library of Congress, for being "culturally, historically, or aesthetically significant." It has since had varying distribution on videotape, laserdisc, DVD, and online.

== Reception and legacy ==
In 1973, Chuck Kraemer predicted that David Holzman's Diary would be remembered as "the underground autobiographical cinema verité film of the sixties," and that "scholars of the nineties will revere it." Since then, the film has remained obscure to the general public while developing and maintaining a strong critical reputation, such that its ratings on Rotten Tomatoes are 91% approval among critics and 76% approval among audiences. Likewise, the TV Guide website says that "this provocative, endlessly self-conscious film today stands as one of the best independent films of the 1960s."

After its initial years on the festival circuit, David Holzman's Diary gradually became "a classic, shown in university classes and film classes" for reasons including its engagement with film theory and practice. In terms of film practice, it shows a young man using various newly available film technologies and innovative techniques, including "static long takes with monologues; extended passages of black screen; fish-eye distortions; [and] lateral travellings that offer Arbus-like views of everyday grotesquerie." It shows David using these techniques in making a diary film, a format that is technically simple and affordable—a natural option for young creative filmmakers with limited resources. One such young filmmaker at the time was Brian De Palma, who said that:

When I first got my 8mm sound camera, I'd carry it around like David Holzman and try to film everything I did and look at it. My friends and I had cameras all the time and we were all film directors. I filmed a whole section of my life—people I was going out with, my friends. I just shot everything. I directed the scenes, too. And it all came from David Holzman's Diary.

David Holzman's Diary has been referenced directly or indirectly in subsequent films including the 1969 drama Coming Apart, the 1974 comedy feature Yackety Yack, the 2001 comedy-drama CQ, and the 2002 comedy short Camera Noise. In 2011, Kevin B. Lee made a two-part online documentary about the film titled Diary of David Holzman. Film critics, scholars, and fans also have written a lot about various aspects of the film, mostly its complicated relations between fact and fiction; between art and life; and between the public and private spheres.

=== Relations Between Fact and Fiction ===
This film's engagement with fact vs. fiction elicited some of its earliest and strongest critical reactions, namely from audience members who felt duped; angry that they were led to believe that David Holzman was an actual person and the film was a documentary. Viewers at the Flaherty Seminar screening were reportedly "outraged" at the film, which also was "booed at the 1968 San Francisco Film Festival when the end credits revealed it to be fiction." A college newspaper review noted a sense of "great shock" at having "thought we'd found a truth about life from a film of lived life; instead, we got that meaning from a piece of imaginative art." L. M. Kit Carson said that, given such reactions, when MoMA was to screen the film in 1968, the museum billed the film as a comedy rather than a documentary.

All this shock and anger may seem to be overreacting, but the film touched a nerve by being so convincing and waiting until the latest possible moment to reveal that it was all staged. The film was so convincing due to many techniques, including its consistent use of mobile camera and sound equipment, location filming, minimal editing, unknown actors, improvised dialogue, and highly personal subject matter, with the David character talking extensively about himself. Louise Spence and Vinicius Navarro identify some additional techniques: "the direct address to the camera, the wandering narrative, the visual and aural disorder (muddy sound and blurred focus), and the compulsive use of dates to describe the day's filming." Altogether, they write, this carefully crafted film violated "the contract that binds documentary filmmakers to their audiences;" it did a lot of work to "upset our faith in documentary representation and presumptions that are often associated with non-fiction cinema."

Further blurring lines between fiction and fact, this film explores how, even in actual documentaries, truth can be manipulated—consciously or unconsciously—before, during, and after filming. Vincent Canby wrote that the film "highlights questions we all have about the quality of truth that can be captured by the cinema verité camera," and about the "awful possibilities for distortion" via the editing process. In his critical monologue within the film, Pepe speaks to how the act of filming can change what's being filmed:

As soon as you start filming something, whatever happens in front of the camera is not reality any more. It becomes a work of art ... And you stop living somehow. And you get very self-conscious about anything you do. 'Should I put my hand here?' ... 'Should I place myself on this side of the frame?' And your decisions stop being moral decisions, and they become aesthetical decisions.

Putting this differently, Jaime Wolf writes that David Holzman's Diary applies what film critic Andrew Sarris described as the Heisenberg Uncertainty Principle of documentary filmmaking, namely "the inevitable effect of the presence of an observer on the behavior of the observed." For better or worse, consciously or not, overtly or subtly, people often play to the camera, behaving differently than they otherwise would. Nowhere in this film is this more overt than in David's scene with the unnamed character dubbed by some as the "Thunderbird Lady." This extended scene of a woman—a self-proclaimed nude model—sitting in her car and talking boldly and crudely to the cameraman, mostly about sex—is just too extreme for an actual unmediated encounter, even on the streets of New York. Several critics noted her exaggerated performance for the camera, as well as the fact that she also altered what was going on behind the camera during this scene. L. M. Kit Carson reports that he "choked and dummied up" and "became so unnerved" at this bizarre interview situation that Michael Wadleigh had to take over and complete the interview for him, something barely noticeable in the final film.

David begins his diary by quoting Godard's famous statement that the medium of cinema is "truth twenty-four times a second." However, as Edward Copeland has observed, David does not mention that Godard's full quote ends with, "and every cut is a lie." Many writers have discussed the implications of David Holzman's Diary for truth beyond the area of documentary film—for cinema and photographic media more generally. Emanuel Levy writes that David Holzman's Diary is an example of "the impossibility of achieving complete objectivity on screen." TV Guide describes the film as, "One of cinema's most pointed statements about the impossibility of objectivity in film." Similarly, Justin Stewart calls the film "a hoaxed blast of 'reality' whose main subject is the impossibility of objective documentation."

Many writers have described David Holzman's Diary as a satire of documentary films or filmmakers. For example, that the film "takes funny jabs" at the self-importance or seriousness of practitioners of the new "personal cinema." These were filmmakers who "established a new relationship with their subjects: intimate, revelatory and personal, countering a documentary tradition in which human beings were primarily used to illustrate various social themes." Filmmakers including Richard Leacock, D.A. Pennebaker, Andrew Noren, and the Maysles brothers. Regarding the extent to which his film mocks such filmmakers, McBride says he was not criticizing specific works or people; instead, he was jabbing at ideas—popular ideas about film and truth:

There was this general feeling or idea that there was this kind of truth that could be revealed that had never been revealed before. This was very enticing to me, but at the same time it was also silly, the idea that there is some kind of objective truth that can be revealed. And so I got this idea to make a film about a guy who thought he could find out the truth about himself and about his life by filming it, and not succeed.

More recent writings on David Holzman's Diary sometimes group the film with subsequent fiction films that likewise posed as documentaries, including The Blair Witch Project and films by Christopher Guest such as This is Spinal Tap. Dave Kehr describes David Holzman's Diary as, "much more convincing than Woody Allen's Zelig." Jaime N. Christley groups it with Catfish and Exit Through the Gift Shop. Other writings from recent years cite filmmaking techniques in David Holzman's Diary that were unusual at the time but have become more common, such as the direct address by characters to the camera, or the creative use of end credit sequences, usually in the form of entertaining behind-the-scenes outtakes captured while making fiction films.

=== Relations Between Art and Life ===
Many writers have noted ways that David Holzman's Diary depicts complicated relations between art and life; how David's life motivates and shapes his art, and vice versa. How his social life, his daily life at home, his background in film—all shape his artistic energy and choices, with various affects. And, vice versa, how David's art shapes his life, and the lives of others, unfortunately often negatively. Film critic Chuck Kraemer captures some of this complexity when he writes that David is, "every down-and-out filmmaker struggling for a vision, every sensitive New Yorker overwhelmed by the city's visual fecundity, every young man suffering lost love, every inchoate artist trying to sort out his life, to explain himself to himself, and to the world."

For David, art and life are fused in New York film culture. He is deeply immersed in films, constantly thinking about them, watching them, and quoting other people about them. Film is his obsession, but his daily life also includes radio and TV consumption. As Brody writes, David's city life depicts an "endless stream of Top Forty radio and a wondrous, hectic view of television." The Top Forty radio that David listens to includes news reports of war and social unrest along with popular music; and the "hectic view" refers to the sequence that David made by filming one frame from each shot from a whole evening's worth of network TV. Sitting all evening and clicking his camera once after every shot transition, David produced a two-and-a-half minute deluge of separate shots from a Huntley-Brinkley Report newscast; then from episodes of Batman, Star Trek, The Dean Martin Show, and a talk show; and then a late-night airing of the Shirley Temple film Bright Eyes. And, as David Blakeslee writes, a lot of commercials, "Still capable after all these years, and even in this incomprehensibly compressed format of delivering their powerfully efficient subliminal messages." This blast of television images speaks to aspects of David's life including the multitudes of images coming to him (and us) daily; and his rather boring life, insular and filled with TV and radio broadcasts along with film. It may also refer to Godard's "24 frames per second," how each individual frame conveys meaning in itself and in relation to other frames, in this case with a total of about 3,600 consecutive frames.

David's life is shaped by images and popular culture, but he is not simply a passive consumer. He is an energetic and creative young filmmaker. Making films takes up a lot of his time, and affects his life, and those of other people, in various ways, not always with good results. While making his film, poking into peoples' lives, David alienates and even endangers women and gets himself punched by a cop. As Jaime N. Christley observes, "we meet David in personal and professional freefall. Bad choices, bad pathology, and just plain bad luck coalesce into a black cloud that eventually consumes his life, and before the spare title cards indicate the film's conclusion, our hero will have lost his girlfriend, his camera and sound kit, and revealed himself to be a minor sociopath with major control issues." TV Guide likewise lauds the film for being "unafraid to present and implicitly criticize the more unpleasant sides of its 'hero.'"

=== Relations Between Public and Private ===
One key part of this film's engagement with art and life is its depiction of relations between public and private, relations that are gendered. As James Latham writes, David uses his film project partly to assert power over women; to spy on them, stalk them, and record them with or without permission, and thereby to potentially make those images public. Part of David's motivation for asserting this power, Latham writes, is that he is experiencing flipped gender roles, or "patriarchy in crisis." In an era when women (as well as people of color and members of the LGBT community) are gradually gaining some power in public spaces, David "represents the growing realization that male power over women is waning." Whereas Sandra, Penny, and the anonymous subway woman "are independent and associated with the outside man's world, David is comparatively needy, impotent, and isolated in his small inner world. [Only the "Thunderbird Lady"] is willing to indulge him, except she is too liberated and aggressive for David."

Many writers have noted the film's clear references to Rear Window (1954) and Peeping Tom (1960) and their related issues. Jonathan Rosenbaum writes, for example, that these films examine "notions of the camera as a probing instrument, especially in relation to voyeurism and other forms of aggressive sexual appropriation as well as self-scrutiny." Other critics note the public-private irony of fashion model Penny being unwilling to appear in David's film; or that David is "naked to everyone, but invisible to himself."

More recent writings on David Holzman's Diary sometimes refer to how technology and culture have evolved since the 1960s, further blurring boundaries between private and public. For example, David Blakeslee writes that when he watched the film recently on the Vimeo website, he knew practically nothing about it, except that "it could be seen as a precursor of sorts to the 21st century phenomenon of YouTube vloggers who chronicle their lives to varying degrees of mundane detail, seeking to pull viewers into whatever fascinating experiences or excruciating dilemmas they think would hold their attention. Obviously, a lot has happened in the realm of personal public self-disclosure on film and video between 1967 and now."

=== Aftermath ===
Typical for a small independent film, David Holzman's Diary was made by a small group of young and virtually unknown people who mostly continued to be unknown. This was the feature film debut for McBride and Carson; both of them continued to work over the years together or separately on some film and TV projects. Carson worked as a writer on the 1984 film Paris, Texas and on McBride's 1983 remake of Godard's Breathless. McBride directed the 1987 New Orleans neo-noir film The Big Easy and the 1989 Jerry Lee Lewis biopic Great Balls of Fire!, as well as episodes of the television shows Six Feet Under and The Wonder Years. Michael Wadleigh directed and was a cinematographer and writer for the Oscar-winning 1970 concert documentary Woodstock, and directed, wrote, and acted in the 1981 horror thriller Wolfen.
