= Jim McBride =

American screenwriter

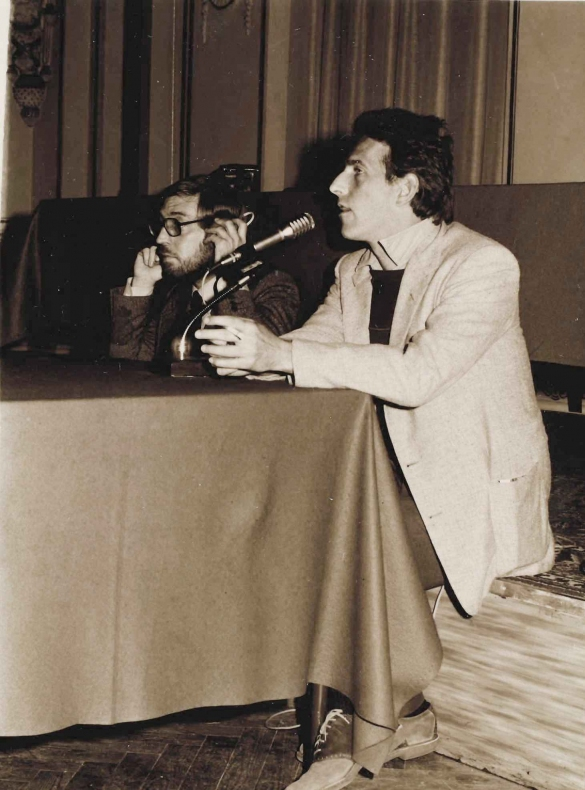
- Jim McBride and Adriano Aprà (Salsomaggiore, 1981)
- Born: September 16, 1941 (age 84); New York City, U.S.
- Occupations: Screenwriter, producer, television and film director

Jim McBride (born September 16, 1941) is an American screenwriter, producer and director.

== Legacy ==
Richard Brody, writing for The New Yorker, named McBride as one of the twelve greatest living narrative filmmakers, citing David Holzman's Diary as a "time capsule of sights and sounds, ideas and moods, politics and history", and "one of the greatest first films", but noted that he only considered him one of the greatest for that specific film.

== Filmography ==
- David Holzman's Diary (1967)
- My Girlfriend's Wedding (1969)
- Glen and Randa (1971)
- Pictures from Life's Other Side (1971)
- Hot Times (1974)
- Breathless (1983)
- The Big Easy (1986)
- Great Balls of Fire! (1989)
- Blood Ties (1991) – TV movie
- The Wrong Man (1993)
- Uncovered (1994)
- Pronto (1997) – TV movie
- The Informant (1997) – TV movie
- Dead by Midnight (1997) – TV movie
- Meat Loaf: To Hell and Back (2000) – TV movie

Television Series

- The Twilight Zone (1986)
- The Wonder Years (1990–1991)
- Fallen Angels (1995) – Episode "Fearless" (1995)
- Six Feet Under (2001)

== Awards ==
Wins

- Mannheim-Heidelberg International Filmfestival: Grand Prize; for David Holzman's Diary; 1967.
- Cognac Festival du Film Policier: Grand Prix; for The Big Easy; 1987.

Nominations

- Independent Spirit Awards: Independent Spirit Award; Best Director, for The Big Easy 1988.
- Venice Film Festival: Golden Lion; for The Informant; 1997.
