= The November Men =

1993 American political thriller

- Directed by: Paul Williams
- Screenplay by: James Andronica
- Produced by: Paul Williams; Rodney Byron Ellis
- Starring: James Andronica; Leslie Bevis; Beau Starr; P. W. Williams; Coralissa Gines; Rod Ellis; Robert Davi; Lexie Shine
- Cinematography: Susan Emerson
- Edited by: Chip Brooks
- Music by: Scott Thomas Smith
- Distributed by: Rohdhouse; Sun Lion Films
- Release date: 1993
- Running time: 96 minutes
- Country: United States
- Language: English

The November Men is a 1993 political thriller film directed by Paul Williams, starring James Andronica, who also wrote the screenplay. Williams (credited as P. W. Williams) also had an acting role in the film.

== Premise ==
The story concerns a documentary filmmaker Duggo (Andronica) who makes the observation that the only successful assassinations of politicians are the work of right-wing radicals, and sets out to fake an attempt on the life of the newly-elected George Bush.

== Production ==
The film employs real-life documentary footage made by the crew of The November Men, and the introduction to the film states:

"The elected officials who appear in this movie were not aware of the filming and its eventual use here. All cinematography took place in strict compliance with the Laws and The Constitution of the United States of America, as they have stood since the Election Year of 1992."

== Cast ==
The cast

- James Andronica as Duggo
- Leslie Bevis as (camerawoman) Elizabeth
- Beau Starr as Chief Agent Granger
- Paul P. W. Williams as Arthur
- Coralissa Gines as Lorina
- Rod Ellis as Agent Clancy

also

- Robert Davi
- Lexie Shine

== Reviews ==
Time Out said the "multi-layered, twisting denouement supports Lyndon Johnson's belief that there's no need to worry about the left, they'll never pick up a gun - 'It's the right you have to worry about; [if] they don't get what they want, they'll blow [your] fucking head off.'"

== Home media ==
A DVD of the film, titled Double Exposure, was released in Australia by Flashback Entertainment. The DVD case credits Oliver Stone with the comment "Brilliant Filmmaking". The plot outline on the rear of the case states "It began with a simple idea by radical film-maker Arthur Gwenlyn. But how far does a film-maker go to make his film believable?"
