= Sean Young =

American actress (born 1959)

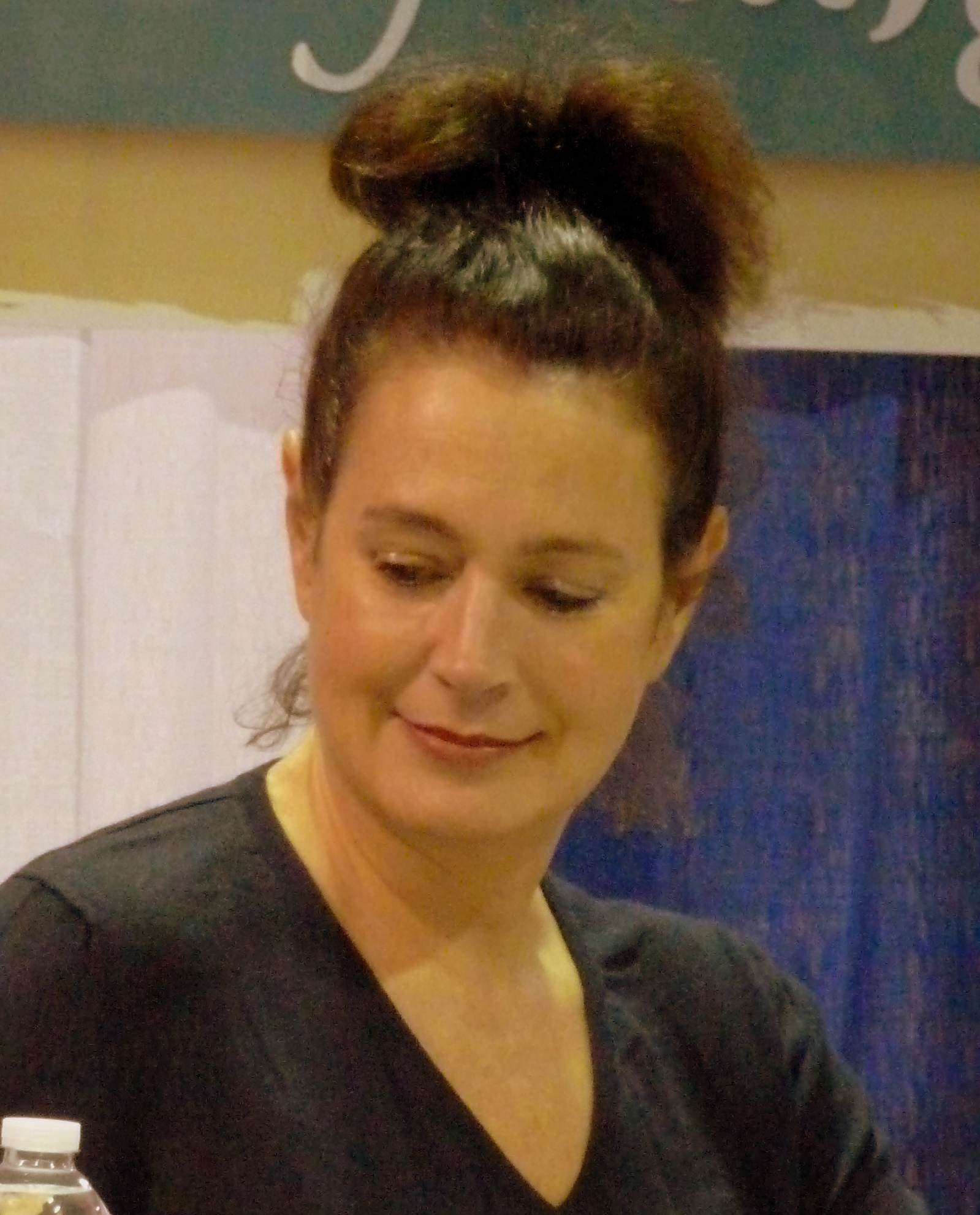
- Young in 2012
- Born: Mary Sean Young; November 20, 1959 (age 66); Louisville, Kentucky, U.S.
- Occupation: Actress
- Years active: 1980–present
- Spouses: Robert Lujan (m. 1990; div. 2002) (m. 2011)
- Children: 2
- Website: maryseanyoung.com

Sean Young (born Mary Sean Young, November 20, 1959) is an American actress. She is notable for starring in science-fiction and comedy films throughout the 1980s and 1990s, although she has performed in many genres.

Young's first successful film was the comedy Stripes (1981). She rose to prominence for her roles in Blade Runner, Young Doctors in Love (both 1982), Dune (1984), No Way Out, Wall Street (both 1987), Hold Me, Thrill Me, Kiss Me (1992) and Ace Ventura: Pet Detective (1994). Since the 2000s, she has predominantly appeared in independent projects, with the exception of The Young and the Restless (2010–2011) and Blade Runner 2049 (2017).

== Early life ==
Young was born in Louisville, Kentucky, the daughter of Donald Young Jr., a television producer and journalist, and Lee Guthrie (Mary Lee Kane), a screenwriter, public-relations executive, and journalist.

She was a student at the Interlochen Arts Academy in Interlochen, Michigan. She also attended the School of American Ballet in New York City.

== Career ==
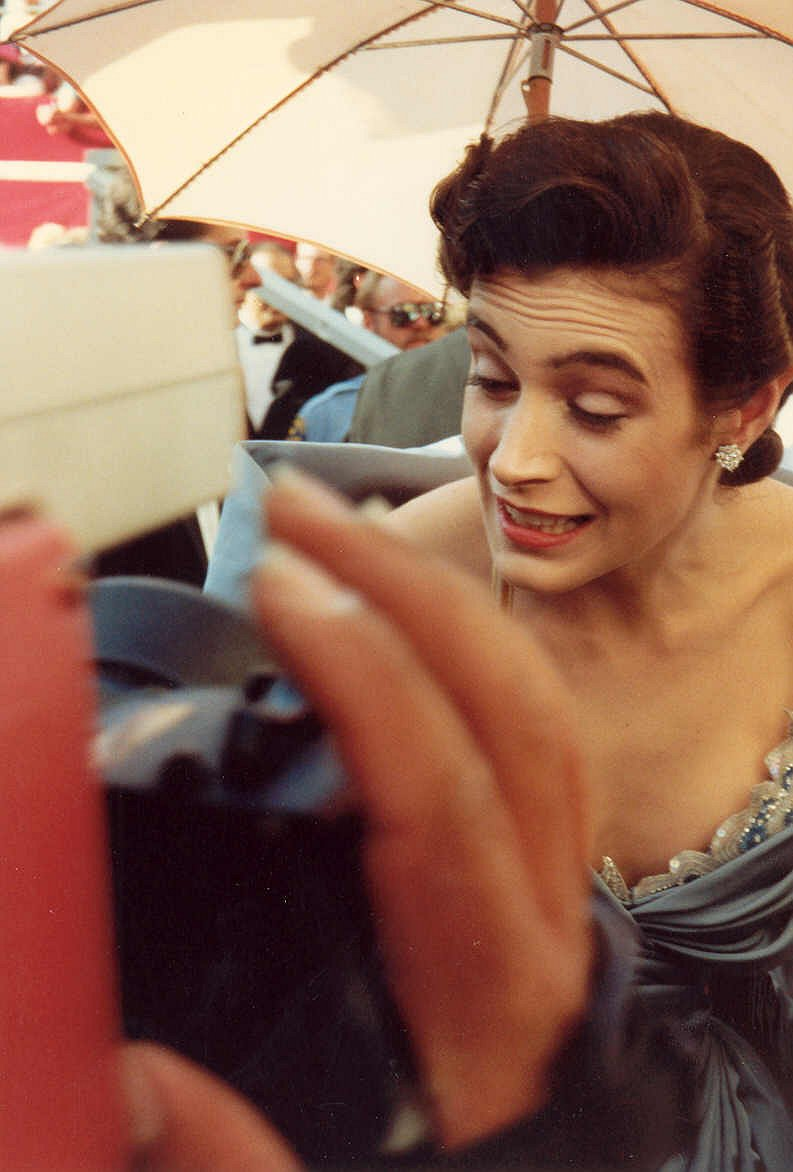
Young attending the 60th Academy Awards in 1988

Young began her film career in Jane Austen in Manhattan (1980), followed by a role in the film Stripes (1981). She then played the female lead, Rachael, alongside Harrison Ford in the classic science-fiction film Blade Runner (1982). On television, Young played the female lead opposite Lenny Von Dohlen in Under the Biltmore Clock (1986), based on F. Scott Fitzgerald's story "Myra Meets His Family". The following year, she had a small role in the film Wall Street (1987) as the wife of Michael Douglas's character, Gordon Gekko. Her role was originally intended to be larger, but was significantly reduced due to clashes with Oliver Stone.

One of Young's most prominent roles was as the lover of a ruthless Washington, DC, politician (Gene Hackman) in No Way Out (also 1987), alongside Kevin Costner. Her other credits include Dune (1984) (playing Paul Atreides's love interest Chani), Baby: Secret of the Lost Legend (1985), and Fatal Instinct (1993). Young appeared in The Boost (1988) with James Woods. She was next cast as Vicki Vale in Tim Burton's film Batman (1989), but during rehearsals, she broke her arm after falling off a horse and was replaced by Kim Basinger.

In 1991, she was awarded the Worst Actress and the Worst Supporting Actress Razzies for her roles in A Kiss Before Dying. She played the main antagonist in the comedy Ace Ventura: Pet Detective (1994). She also played Helen Hyde in the comedy Dr. Jekyll and Ms. Hyde (1995).

Young was considered for the role of Selina Kyle / Catwoman in the 1992 film Batman Returns. Young reportedly visited the Warner Bros. lot in a homemade Catwoman costume for an impromptu audition with director Tim Burton, who allegedly hid under his desk while actor Michael Keaton and producer Mark Canton briefly met with her. She also showcased her costume on Entertainment Tonight and pitched it on The Joan Rivers Show. Warner Bros. ultimately decided that Young did not align with their vision for Catwoman.

During most of the 1990s, Young resided in Sedona, Arizona, and her career cooled. She reprised her role as Rachael in the Blade Runner video game released in 1997. Young has appeared in independent films, including roles in Poor White Trash (2000), Mockingbird Don't Sing (2001), and Sugar & Spice (also 2001). She spent four months in Russia filming the miniseries Yesenin (2005), in which she portrayed dancer Isadora Duncan.

In 2008, Young competed in the television program Gone Country 2, which included a competition in a celebrity demolition derby at the Henry County Fairgrounds in Paris, Tennessee. Young went on to win the celebrity derby heat and then went on to compete against 21 professional demolition derby drivers. Young finished in fourth place. In 2010, she was cast on the first season of the ABC series Skating with the Stars as a celebrity contestant, who skated with professional skater Denis Petukhov, but she was the first celebrity to be eliminated.

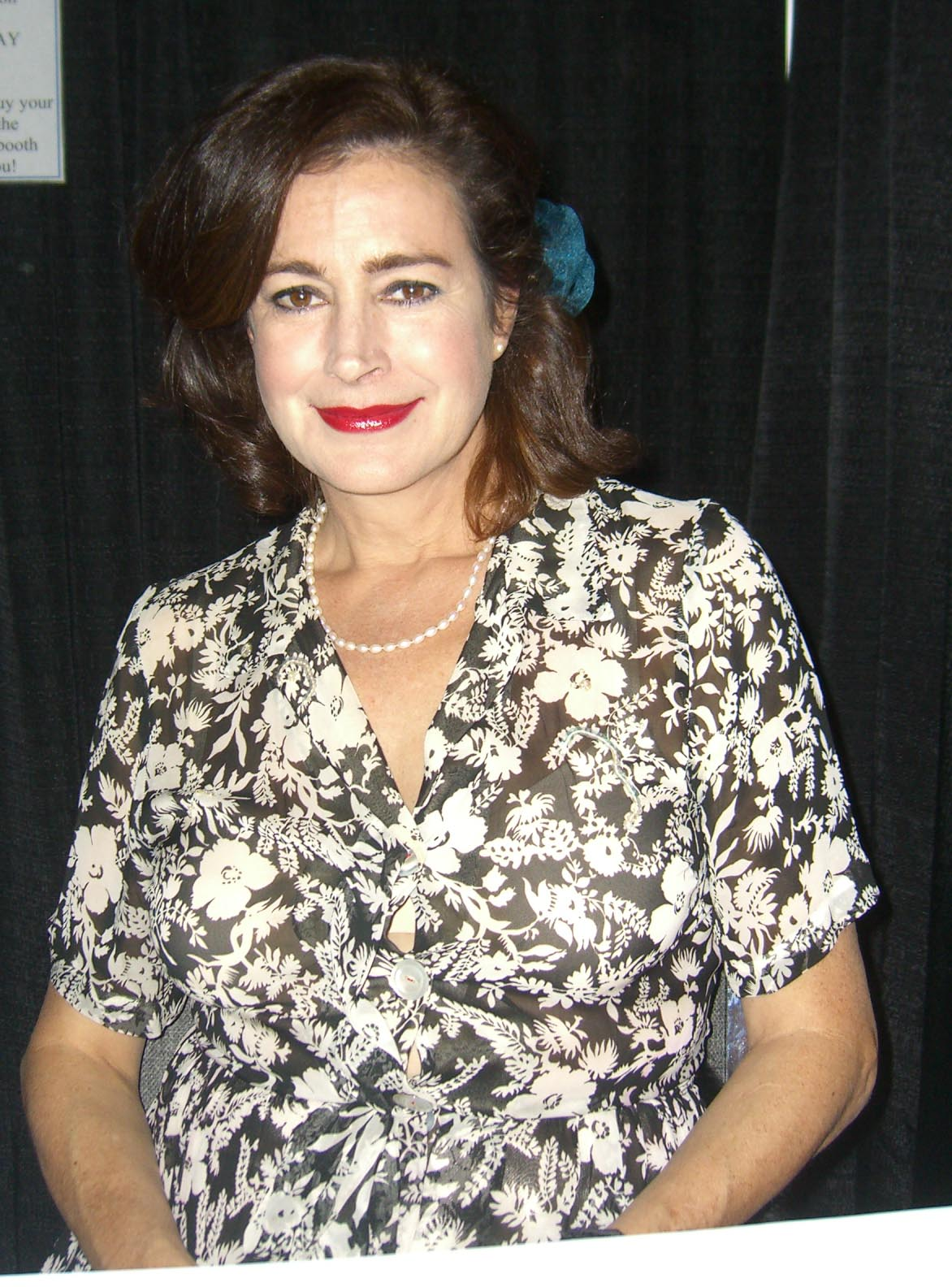
Young in 2009

Young appeared on The Young and the Restless in June 2010 as Canadian barmaid Meggie McClain, alongside good friend Eric Braeden. She returned to the show on July 14 in a recurring role, which lasted through February 2011.

In October 2011, Young appeared on Late Show with David Letterman. During the interview, she described how she was now looking for movie work after raising her two sons, and produced a short video clip promoting her job search, which Letterman played. She was subsequently cast in a film about Nikola Tesla, titled Fragments From Olympus: The Vision of Nikola Tesla (still in development as of August, 2023).

In October 2013, Young played the role of Dr. Lucien in Star Trek: Renegades, a fan project to create a pilot for a new Star Trek series (released in August 2015) where several former Star Trek actors appeared, including Tim Russ (who also directed the pilot) and Walter Koenig. In June 2013, Young performed in a benefit skating event at the Ice Theater of New York, competing in a Celebrity Skating competition against YouTube personality Michael Buckley, and US Olympic Fencing silver medalist Tim Morehouse.

Young reprised her 1982 role of Rachael for Blade Runner 2049 (2017), portraying both the original (using archival footage from the first film) and a brand new cloned version of the character. This was achieved through the use of another actress as a body double. Sean Young was also credited in the new film as acting coach to Loren Peta, the actress portraying her character.

== Personal life ==
In 1990, Young married Robert Lujan, an actor and composer, with whom she has two sons. The couple divorced in 2002, but remarried in 2011.

In January 2008, Young checked herself into rehabilitation for alcohol abuse. A later stay in rehab occurred in 2011, which was depicted on Celebrity Rehab with Dr. Drew, as were Lujan's visits to her.

In October 2017, Young joined the growing number of women to have alleged that producer Harvey Weinstein sexually harassed, sexually intimidated, or sexually assaulted them.

In 1989, actor James Woods sued Young for allegedly harassing him and his fiancée. Young denied the allegations, and claimed Woods filed the lawsuit out of spite after she declined his romantic advances. The suit was settled out of court in 1989, and Young was awarded $227,000 to cover her legal costs.

== Filmography ==
=== Film ===
Year	Film	Role	Notes
1980	Jane Austen in Manhattan	Ariadne Charlton	
1981	Stripes	Louise Cooper	
1982	Blade Runner	Rachael	
1982	Young Doctors in Love	Dr. Stephanie Brody	
1984	Dune	Chani	
1985	Baby: Secret of the Lost Legend	Susan Matthews-Loomis	
1987	No Way Out	Susan Atwell	
1987	Wall Street	Kate Gekko	
1988	The Boost	Linda Brown	
1989	Cousins	Tish Kozinski	
1990	Fire Birds	Billie Lee Guthrie	
1991	A Kiss Before Dying	Dorothy / Ellen Carlsson	
1992	Forever	Mary Miles Minter	
1992	Love Crimes	Dana Greenway	
1992	Once Upon a Crime	Phoebe	
1992	Blue Ice	Stacy Mansdorf	
1992	Hold Me, Thrill Me, Kiss Me	Twinkle	
1993	Even Cowgirls Get the Blues	Marie Barth	
1993	Fatal Instinct	Lola Cain	
1994	Bolt	Patty Deerheart	Direct-to-video
1994	Ace Ventura: Pet Detective	Lt. Lois Einhorn / Ray Finkle	
1995	Mirage	Jennifer Gale	
1995	Dr. Jekyll and Ms. Hyde	Helen Hyde	
1996	The Proprietor	Virginia Kelly / Sally	
1997	Exception to the Rule	Angela Bayer	
1997	The Invader	Annie Neilsen	
1997	Men	Stella James	
1997	The Dog of Flanders	Sister Alois	Voice English dub
1998	Out of Control	Lena	
1999	Motel Blue	Lana Hawking	
2000	Poor White Trash	Linda Bronco	
2000	The Amati Girls	Christine	
2001	Sugar & Spice	Mrs. Hill	
2001	Mockingbird Don't Sing	Dr. Judy Bingham	
2001	Night Class	Claire Sherwood	
2002	Aftermath	Rachel Anderson	
2002	The House Next Door	Monica	
2002	Threat of Exposure	Dr. Daryl Sheleigh	
2004	A Killer Within	Rebecca "Becky" Terrill	
2004	Until the Night	Cosma	
2004	In the Shadow of the Cobra	Samantha	
2005	Ghosts Never Sleep	Rebecca	
2005	Headspace	Mother	
2006	The Drop	Ivy	
2006	The Garden	Miss Grace Chapman	
2006	Living the Dream	Brenda	
2008	The Man Who Came Back	Kate	
2008	Parasomnia	Madeline Volpe	
2008	Haunted Echoes	Laura	Direct-to-video
2008	Harvest Moon	Meg	
2012	The Black Dove	Bonnie Williams	
2013	Jug Face	Loriss	
2013	Send No Flowers	Toni	
2013	Gingerclown	Nelly the Spiderwoman	Voice
2014	My Trip Back to the Dark Side	Sean Young	
2014	My Man Is a Loser	Therapist	
2015	Bone Tomahawk	Mrs. Porter	
2015	Darling	Madame	
2016	Confidence Game	Sylvie	
2017	Future '38	Mabel	
2017	Police State		
2017	Lost Cat Corona	Roxie	
2017	In Vino	Linda	
2017	Blade Runner 2049	Rachael / Rachael Clone	Archive footage and likeness. Acting coach to substitute actress
2018	Above All Things	Barbara	
2018	Escape Room	Ramona	
2018	Healed By Grace 2	Becky Cavanaugh	
2018	Mea Culpa	Miss Sylvian	Short film
2020	Axcellerator	Graham	
2020	A Beautiful Distraction	Brigid	
2020	5th Borough	Sabina	
2020	Who Wants Dessert?	Dr. Sarah Chambers	Short film
2020	Nick and Nicky	Gloria	
2021	Planet Dune	Chase	
2022	No Vacancy	Brandi Michaels	
2023	The Activated Man	Agnes Gabriel	
2025	The Dummy Detective	Harriet Hubbard	

=== Television ===
Year	Film	Role	Notes
1985	American Playhouse	Myra Harper	Episode: "Under the Biltmore Clock"
1985	Tender is the Night	Rosemary Hoyt	4 episodes
1986	Blood & Orchids	Leonore Bergman	TV movie
1992	Sketch Artist	Rayanne Whitfield	TV movie
1994	Witness to the Execution	Jessica Traynor	TV movie
1994	Model by Day	Mercedes	TV movie
1996	Evil Has a Face	Gwen McGerrall	TV movie
1996	Everything to Gain	Mallory Ashton / Jordan Keswick	TV movie
1997	Gun	Paula	Episode: "All the President's Women"
1998	The Cowboy and the Movie Star	Sean Livingston	TV movie
2000	Secret Cutting	Joyce Cottrell	TV movie
2002	Third Watch	Nancy	2 episodes
2003	Russians in the City of Angels	Rachael Somov	8 episodes
2003	Kingpin	Lorelei Klein	Episode: "Black Magic Woman"
2003	Before I Say Goodbye	Nell MacDermott Cauliff	TV movie
2003	First to Die	Joanna Wade	TV miniseries
2003	The King and Queen of Moonlight Bay	Sandy Bateman	TV movie
2003	Boston Public	Candy Sobell	Episode: "Chapter Sixty-Eight"
2004	Reno 911!	New Wiegel	Episode: "Department Investigation: Part 2"
2005	Third Man Out	Ann Rutka	TV movie
2005	Yesenin	Isadora Duncan	TV miniseries
2005	Home for the Holidays	Martha McCarthy	TV movie
2006	A Job to Kill For	Jennifer Kamplan	TV movie
2006	CSI: Crime Scene Investigation	Dusty	Episode: "Built to Kill: Part 2"
2007	ER	Anna Hayes	Episode: "Crisis of Conscience"
2007	One Tree Hill	Hope Brown	Episode: "The Runaway Found"
2007	Jesse Stone: Sea Change	Sybil Martin	TV movie
2010–2011	The Young and the Restless	Meggie McClaine	45 episodes
2012	Attack of the 50 Foot Cheerleader	Brenda Stratford	TV movie
2018	The Alienist	Mrs. Van Burgen	4 episodes

=== Video games ===
Year	Video game	Role	Notes
1997	Blade Runner: The Video Game	Rachael	Voice and likeness
2018	Happy's Humble Burger Farm	Dr. Rochelle Luna	Voice

=== Web ===
Year	Film	Role	Notes
2015	Star Trek: Renegades	Dr. Lucien	Fan film

== See also ==
- List of people from the Louisville metropolitan area
