= Hans Koning =

American novelist (1921–2007)

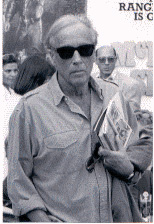
- Hans Koning at the Cannes Film Festival
- Born: Hans Königsberger; July 12, 1921; Amsterdam, Netherlands
- Died: April 13, 2007 (aged 85); Easton, Connecticut, U.S.
- Occupations: Writer and journalist
- Website: https://www.hanskoning.net

Hans Koning (born Hans Königsberger, July 12, 1921 – April 13, 2007) was a Dutch American author of over 40 fiction and non-fiction books. Koning was also a prolific journalist, contributing for almost 60 years to many periodicals including The New York Times, International Herald Tribune, Atlantic Monthly, The Nation, Harper's, The New Yorker, and De Groene Amsterdammer. He used the pen name Hans Koningsberger (with an added letter 'n'), and from 1972 Hans Koning.

== Biography ==
Born in Amsterdam in 1921 to Elisabeth van Collem (daughter of socialist poet Abraham Eliazer van Collem) and David Königsberger, he was educated at the University of Amsterdam 1939–41, the University of Zurich 1941–43, and the Sorbonne in 1946.

Escaping the occupied Netherlands with the Resistance (he was a wearer of the Dutch Resistance Cross), he was one of the youngest sergeants in the British Army, 7 Troop, 4 Commando, working as an interpreter during the allied occupation of Germany at the end of the war.

As an editor of De Groene Amsterdammer, a Dutch weekly, 1947–50, he was invited to run a cultural program on Radio Jakarta, Indonesia which he did from 1950 to 1951. It was after this that he came by freighter to the United States. His first novel, The Affair, was published in 1958. He also began writing non-fiction, including several travel books, including Love and Hate in China (1966).

During the Vietnam War he turned his attention to protest, helping to found the still-active 'RESIST' organization in Cambridge, Massachusetts, with Noam Chomsky among others. He was also a creative writing professor at Boston University between 1971 and 1972.

For the next thirty years he wrote fiction and non-fiction and was a two-time recipient of a National Endowment for the Arts fellowship for creative writers, for fiction. Four of his novels were made into films: A Walk with Love and Death, which was Anjelica Huston's first film, directed by her father, John Huston; The Revolutionary, starring Jon Voight; Death of a Schoolboy, for BBC London, and The Petersburg-Cannes Express.

From 2000 to 2006 he also found time to run Literary Discord, a radio program broadcast by WPKN Bridgeport, dedicated to discussing such literature and the state of publishing in the United States. He interviewed, among many others, Russell Banks and Sadi Ranson about the state of publishing in the United States.

His archive is held at Boston University.

== Fiction ==
(Until 1972 writing under the name Hans Koningsberger)

- The Affair, Alfred Knopf 1958, NewSouth Books 2002
- An American Romance, Simon and Schuster 1960, NewSouth Books 2002
- A Walk with Love and Death, Simon and Schuster 1961, NewSouth Books 2003
- I Know What I'm Doing, Simon and Schuster 1964, NewSouth Books 2005
- The Revolutionary: a novel, Farrar Straus Giroux 1967
- Death of a Schoolboy, Harcourt Brace 1974
- The Petersburg-Cannes Express, Harcourt Brace 1975, NewSouth Books 2004
- America Made Me: A Novel, Thunder's Mouth Press 1979
- The Kleber Flight, Atheneum 1981, NewSouth Books 2006
- De Witt's war, Pantheon 1983
- Acts of Faith, Henry Holt 1986
- Pursuit of a Woman on the Hinge of History: A Novel, Lumen Editions, 1997
- Zeeland or Elective Concurrences, NewSouth Books 2001
- The Movie Actress, Dry Ice Pub. 2018

Many of his novels have also been published in other countries including England, the Netherlands, Spain, France, Italy, Germany, and Japan.

== Non-fiction ==
- Love and Hate in China McGraw-Hill, 1966
- Along the Roads of New Russia Farrar Straus Giroux 1967
- World of Vermeer Time Life 1967
- Amsterdam Time Life 1968. With photographs by Patrick Ward.
- The Future of Che Guevara Doubleday 1971
- The Almost World Dial Press 1972
- A New Yorker in Egypt Harcourt Brace 1976
- Nineteen Sixty-Eight: A Personal Report Norton 1987
- Colon: el mito al descubierto. 1991
- Columbus: His Enterprise: Exploding the Myth Monthly Review Press 1976, 1991
- The Conquest of America: How the Indian Nations Lost Their Continent Monthly Review Press 1993
- Hans Koning's Little Book of Comforts and Gripes 2000
- Rene Burri Phaidon Press 2006

== Film ==
- A Walk with Love and Death, 20th Century Fox 1969
- The Revolutionary, United Artists 1970
- Death of a Schoolboy, BBC 1990
- The Petersburg-Cannes Express, John Daly 2003

== Plays ==
- The Blood-Red Cafe
- Hermione
- A Woman of New York

== Children's books ==
- The Golden Keys Doubleday 1956, 1970

== Translations ==
- The Ten Thousand Things by Maria Dermout (Dutch) New York Review of Books 2002
- Carlo Coccioli, Manual the Mexican (French) Simon and Schuster
- The Islands by A. Alberts Tuttle Co. 1999

== Obituaries ==
- Ferguson, James (6 June 2007). "Hans Koning: Prolific internationalist writer, journalist and Columbus biographer". The Guardian. London, UK.
- "Obituary: Hans Koning". The Times. London, UK. May 20, 2007.
- Hawtree, Christopher (June 7, 2007). "Hans Koning: Novelist and travel writer". The Independent. London, UK. Archived from the original on May 5, 2016 – via hanskoning.net.
- Mak, Geert (April 20, 2007). "Hans Koning (1921-2007): Mieters socialist". De Groene Amsterdammer (in Dutch). Amsterdam.
- Martin, Douglas (April 18, 2007). "Hans Koning, 85, Prolific Left-Leaning Writer, Is Dead". The New York Times.
- Rourke, Mary (April 21, 2007). "Hans Koning, 85; world traveler wrote fiction, nonfiction". Los Angeles Times.
