= No Vacancy (2022 film) =

2022 drama film by Kyle Saylors

- Official poster
- Directed by: Kyle Saylors
- Written by: Art Ayris
- Produced by: Art Ayris; Dean Cain; Kenny Saylors
- Starring: T.C. Stallings; Dean Cain; Sean Young
- Cinematography: Kevin Hooper
- Edited by: Joel Farabee
- Music by: Jason & Nolan Livesay
- Production companies: Kingstone Studios; Saylors Brothers
- Distributed by: Fathom Events
- Release date: May 9, 2022
- Running time: 99 minutes
- Country: United States
- Language: English

No Vacancy is a 2022 American drama film directed by Kyle Saylors and starring T.C. Stallings, Dean Cain, and Sean Young.

The film is based on the true story of the First Baptist Church of Leesburg, Florida which purchased the Big Bass Motel in 2009 and transformed it into a residence for the homeless.

== Premise ==
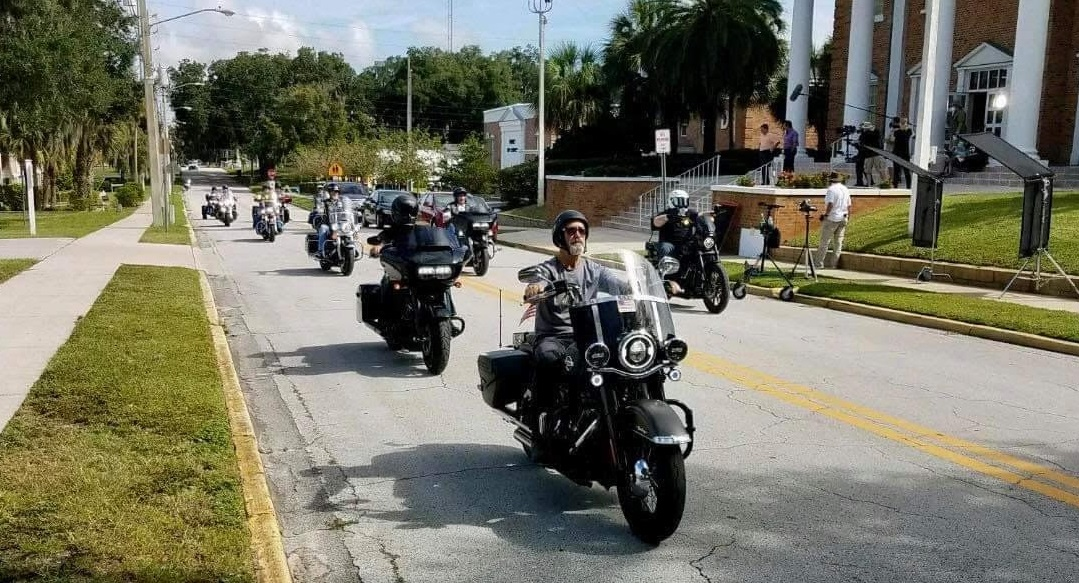
Filming of the movie, No Vacancy in Leesburg, Florida.

No Vacancy is loosely based upon the true story of Brandi Michaels, a jaded local television reporter who is demoted to a rural news outlet in Central Florida just after the 2008 financial crisis. She first struggles with her new location, but is slowly transformed by a recovering addict as she works a news story about a church struggling to purchase a motel for homeless families.

== Production ==
Filming began in 2020, but due to the COVID-19 pandemic, production was halted for safety reasons.

In September 2021, as the pandemic waned in Florida, portions of the film were shot in Leesburg, Florida, the site of the original Samaritan Inn. As the filming was wrapping up, the Delta variant of COVID started to become more prevalent, so medical personnel were stationed on the set. Many of the extras and staff came from the First Baptist Church of Leesburg and around the Leesburg area.
