= Men (1997 film) =

- Directed by: Zoe Clarke-Williams
- Written by: James Andronica; Karen Black; Zoe Clarke-Williams
- Story by: Margaret Diehl
- Produced by: Paul Williams
- Starring: Sean Young
- Cinematography: Susan Helen Emerson
- Edited by: Stephen Eckelberry
- Music by: Mark Mothersbaugh
- Distributed by: Ardustry Home Entertainment
- Release date: October 23, 1997
- Country: United States
- Language: English

Men is a 1997 American indie drama film written and directed by Zoe Clarke-Williams and starring Sean Young.

The film was released in the United States on October 23, 1997.

== Plot ==
Thirty-something chef Stella James lives a rather empty life in New York City with her alcoholic friend Teo, a former lover of hers who is now impotent due to his heavy drinking. Because of this Stella has numerous flings with random men, all of them have different personalities and come from different social economic backgrounds. One day Teo gives her plane ticket to Los Angeles to live without him and give herself a fresh start in a new city. There she gets work in a restaurant run by George Babbington and falls in love with younger photographer Frank.

== Cast ==
- Sean Young as Stella James
- John Heard as George Babbington
- Dylan Walsh as Teo Morrison
- Karen Black as Alex
- Richard Hillman as Frank
- Beau Starr as Tony, Wine Taster
- Glenn Shadix as Neil, Poster
- Shawnee Smith as Clara
- Kenneth Moskow as Mr. Ehreheart
- Annie Fitzgerald as Mrs. Ehreheart
- Paul Williams as Homeless Man
- Annie McEnroe as Annie
