= Dealing: Or the Berkeley-to-Boston Forty-Brick Lost-Bag Blues (film) =

1972 American crime film

- Warner Archive DVD-R cover
- Directed by: Paul Williams
- Screenplay by: David Odell; Paul Williams
- Based on: Dealing: or the Berkeley-to-Boston Forty-Brick Lost-Bag Blues by Michael Crichton and Douglas Crichton
- Produced by: Edward R. Pressman
- Starring: Robert F. Lyons; Barbara Hershey; John Lithgow; Charles Durning; Joy Bang; Ellen Barber; Paul Sorvino
- Cinematography: Ed Brown
- Edited by: Sidney M. Katz
- Music by: Michael Small
- Distributed by: Warner Bros.
- Release date: February 25, 1972
- Running time: 88 minutes
- Country: United States
- Language: English

Dealing: Or the Berkeley-to-Boston Forty-Brick Lost-Bag Blues is a 1972 film based on the 1970 novel of the same name by Michael Crichton and Douglas Crichton, published under the pseudonym Michael Douglas.

It was American independent film directed by Paul Williams and starred Robert F. Lyons and John Lithgow in his film debut in the supporting role of John, the campus drug dealer. Barbara Hershey appears in the role of the novice drug courier, Susan, who loses the bag of bricks on a cross-country flight from Berkeley to Boston.

== Plot ==
Peter is a cocky Harvard law student, who is tired of being square, so his best friend and theater director John gets him into the drug business. Peter loves the excitement of the gig and agrees to transport a suitcase full of pot from his suppliers to him. As a fan of the Rolling Stones' song "Sympathy for the Devil", he picks Lucifer as his street name.

At the drug dealers' hideout, Peter meets Susan and falls for her hard, since she is the complete opposite of his somewhat prudish and stuck up square girlfriend Annie. Susan likes him too and agrees to take him to a train station to hide the dope in one of the lockers there. They hit it off quickly. When they arrive at the station they notice a military officer, who is overseeing a funeral transport for what seems to be a casket of a dead soldier from the Vietnam War. This sight gives the two cold feet, so they leave to spend a night together at one of her musician friends' place.

Peter then completes the job but soon asks John for another gig, since he really wants to see Susan again. However, the gig goes sour this time and the girl is busted with forty bricks (or kilos) of marijuana by police sergeant Murphy, who happens to be a dirty cop in bed with Cortez, a dangerous Cuban gangster. John wants his dope back and Peter wants to save Susan, so they come up with a risky plan that eventually involves a round metal casing full of red heroin which everyone wants and is glad to kill for.

== Cast ==
- Robert F. Lyons as Peter
- Barbara Hershey as Susan
- John Lithgow as John
- Charles Durning as Lt. Murphy
- Joy Bang as Sandra
- Ellen Barber as Annie
- Paul Sorvino as Taxi Driver
- Demond Wilson as Rupert
- Gene Borkan as Musty
- Buzzy Linhart as Buzzy
- Paul Williams as Barry
- Victor Junquera as Cortez
- Howard Gardner as Lecturer
- Nancy Belle Fuller as Avis Girl
- Herbert Kerr as Emir
- Ted Williams as Receptionist
- Anitra Walsh as Townie Girl
- Tom Harvey as Captain Fry
- Victor Argo as 2nd Cuban
- Hector Elias as 3rd Cuban

== Production ==
Film rights were bought in 1970. Filming took place in San Francisco and Boston.

== Reception ==
The Washington Post called it "a rather feckless attempt at a hip thriller".

== See also ==
- List of American films of 1972
