= Nunzio (film) =

1978 American drama film directed by Paul Williams

- Theatrical release poster
- Directed by: Paul Williams
- Written by: James Andronica
- Produced by: Jennings Lang
- Starring: David Proval; James Andronica; Morgana King; Joe Spinell; Tovah Feldshuh; Maria Smith
- Cinematography: Edward R. Brown
- Edited by: Johanna Demetrakas
- Music by: Lalo Schifrin
- Production company: Universal Pictures
- Distributed by: Universal Pictures
- Release date: May 10, 1978
- Running time: 85 minutes
- Country: United States
- Language: English
- Box office: $52,195

Nunzio is a 1978 American drama film directed by Paul Williams and written by James Andronica. The film stars David Proval, James Andronica, Morgana King, Joe Spinell, Tovah Feldshuh and Maria Smith. The film was released on May 10, 1978, by Universal Pictures.

== Plot ==
Nunzio Sabatino (David Proval) is a grown man with the demeanor of a young child. He lives at home with his doting mother (Morgana King) and brother Jamesie (James Andronica). Nunzio has a job as a bicycle delivery man for Angelo (Joe Spinell), the neighborhood grocer. Nunzio is fixated on elements of superhero stories; he wears sweatshirts that he has emblazoned with a shield and a capital "N" in the style of Superman, along with a cape, and often jumps across his neighborhood's rooftops. Younger children enjoy Nunzio's company, particularly Georgie (Glenn Scarpelli), whom he suggests will one day have to take his place as neighborhood do-gooder. However, he is also constantly bullied by a gang of youths, led by JoJo (Vincent Russo), who ridicule his dress and take advantage of his diminished faculties.

In a series of vignettes, Nunzio undergoes challenges to his life. He becomes infatuated with Michelle (Tovah Feldshuh), an attractive employee at the local bakery, but when he expresses his affection, he is heartbroken to learn she is married with a child. He begins to refuse tips for delivering groceries, feeling that since Superman never asks for money for doing good things for people, neither should he, which worries his mother and brother. When delivering groceries to the home of Maryann (Theresa Saldana), JoJo's sometime girlfriend, she coerces him into having sex, which leaves them both feeling guilty and uncomfortable. This feeling is compounded when Nunzio confesses this to his local priest and the priest replies with fiery rhetoric about damnation. Most of all, Nunzio despairs that he is burdening his mother and brother, beginning to neglect his job at Angelo's. After an argument with Jamesie, Nunzio decides to pack a bag and leave home.

As he walks the streets, Nunzio again encounters JoJo and his gang, but successfully hides from them in the basement of an apartment building. However, in their pursuit, the gang inadvertently start a fire in the basement that quickly spreads. Nunzio, who is on the roof when the blaze erupts, descends the fire escape and knocks on every window he can to warn the residents. Most of the tenants escape, but Nunzio notices a remaining resident who is still stuck in her apartment and climbs back up to retrieve her; she is revealed to have leg braces. He carries her down but is alerted by her that she has a sleeping child in the apartment, so he returns and collects the baby. By this time, he cannot use the fire escape and goes up to the roof instead, which is too high for the fire department to reach with their ladder. He improvises swaddling from his jacket to wrap the child up and ties the bundle to his back with a scrap of rope. Nunzio then leaps from the roof to a lower landing, falling on his chest, which allows the firemen to reach him and retrieve the baby.

A few days later, Nunzio and his friends and family, including the woman and child he saved from the building, assemble on their building's stoop to pose for a photograph, holding the newspaper headline that describes him as "Superman."

== Cast ==
- David Proval as Nunzio
- James Andronica as James "Jamesie"
- Morgana King as Mrs. Sabatino
- Joe Spinell as Angelo
- Tovah Feldshuh as Michelle
- Maria Smith as Carol Sabatino
- Vincent Russo as Joe "Jo-Jo"
- Jaime Alba as Bobby
- Theresa Saldana as Maryann
- Glenn Scarpelli as Georgie
- Tony Panetta as Georgie's Friend
- Steve Gucciardo as Carmine
- Sonia Zomina as Mrs. Shuman
- Crystal Hayden as Crystal Sabatino
- Vincent Igneri as Vincent Sabatino
- Tom Quinn as Pete
