= Eagles Mere, Pennsylvania =

Borough in Pennsylvania, US

- Borough
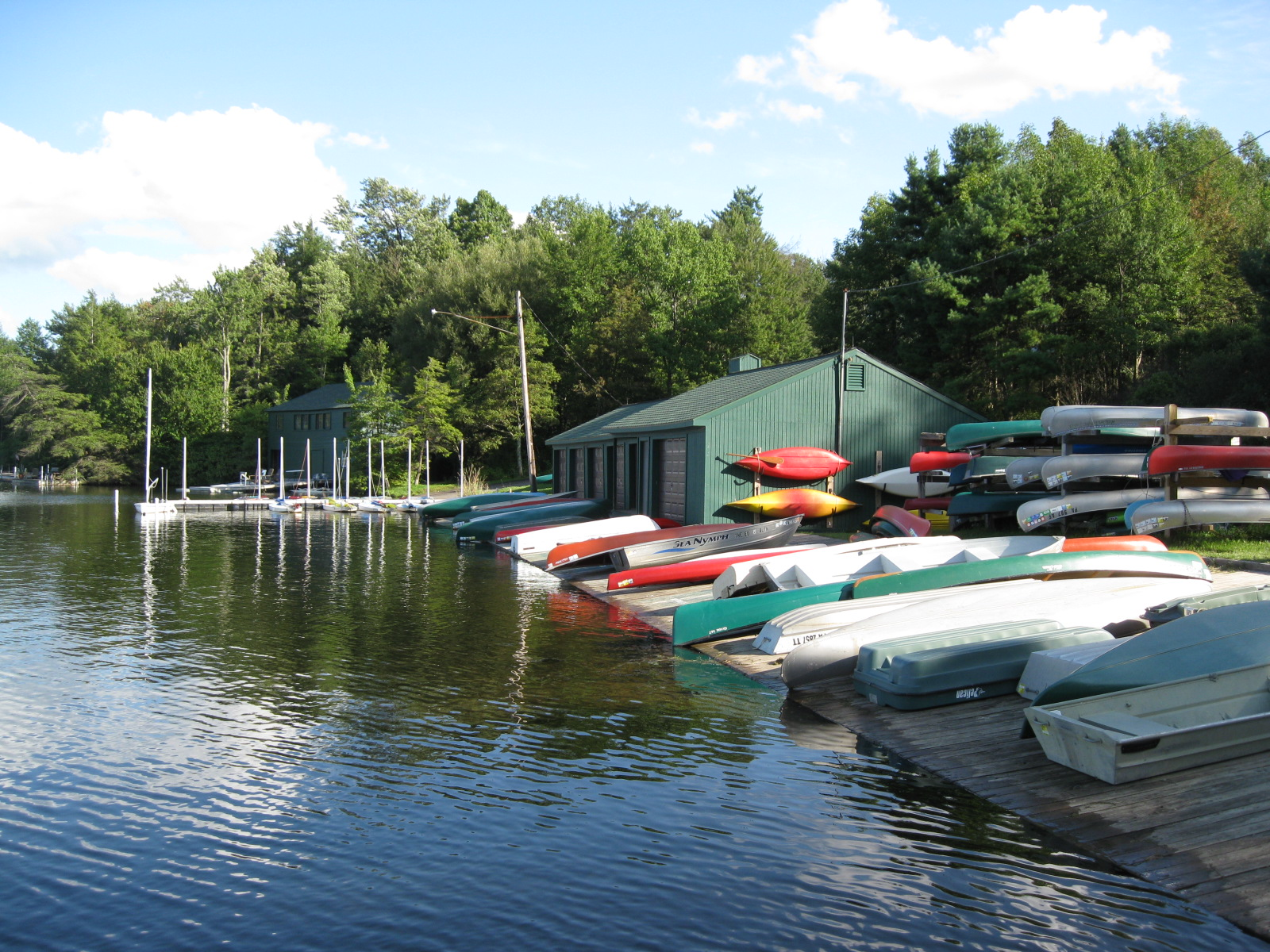
- The lake and marina at Eagles Mere

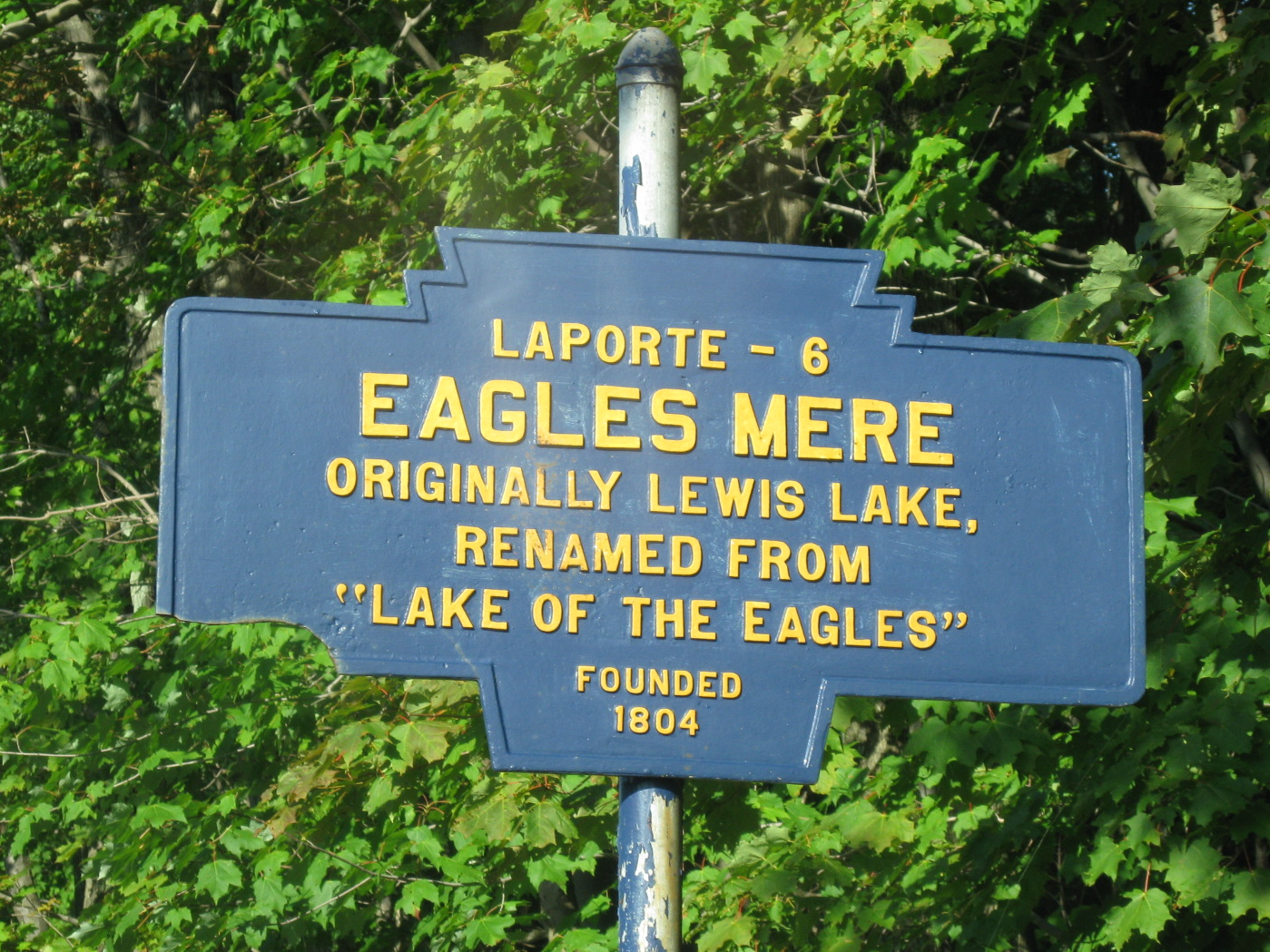
- Keystone Marker

- Location of Eagles Mere in Sullivan County, Pennsylvania.

- Location within the U.S. state of Pennsylvania Eagles Mere (the United States)
- Coordinates: 41°24′39″N 76°34′58″W
- Country: United States
- State: Pennsylvania
- County: Sullivan
- Settled: 1877
- Incorporated (borough): 1899

Area
  - Total: 2.24 sq mi (5.81 km^{2})
  - Land: 2.06 sq mi (5.33 km^{2})
  - Water: 0.19 sq mi (0.48 km^{2}) 8.44%
- Elevation: 2,061 ft (628 m)

Population (2020)
  - Total: 148
  - Density: 71.9/sq mi (27.76/km^{2})
- Time zone: Eastern (EST)
  - Summer (DST): EDT
- Zip code: 17731
- Area code: 570
- FIPS code: 42-20648
- Website: eaglesmerepa.org www.visithistoriceaglesmere.com

Eagles Mere is a borough in Sullivan County, Pennsylvania, United States. The population was 151 at the 2020 census.

== History ==
Eagles Mere was laid out in 1877 and incorporated in 1899. The Eagles Mere Historic District was added to the National Register of Historic Places in 1996. Eagles Mere's name literally means "the eagle's lake", the word mere being a poetic synonym of "lake".

Civil engineer Embley S. Chase came in 1886 to oversee its development as a resort town and laid the ground work. He participated in establishing its street plan, water sports carnival, ice toboggan slide, and trail system. He helped organize the borough, design its water and sewer works, electrify it, and plot the bottom of the lake. He helped design the narrow gauge railroad that once connected it to Sonestown.

Among the five large resort hotels serving the area from the 1880s to 1940s was the Forest Inn, opened in 1902. Its guests included General George C. Marshall and theater director Alvina Krause. Lucy McCammon (a faculty member at nearby Bloomsburg State) and Miss Krause (her longtime companion) leased the Inn's Eagles Mere Playhouse in 1945 and ran it for twenty years; it featured performers such as Patricia Neal, Jimmy Gheen, Charlton Heston, Jennifer Jones, Paula Prentiss, and Richard Benjamin. That troupe is gone, but in 1993 the David A. Dewire Community Center was the site of a nationally recognized summer drama workshop.

== Geography ==
According to the United States Census Bureau, the borough has a total area of 2.2 square miles (5.7 km^{2}), of which 2.0 square miles (5.2 km^{2}) is land and 0.2 square miles (0.52 km^{2}) (8.44%) is water.

== Demographics ==
Historical population
Census	Pop.	Note	%±
1900	312		—
1910	184		−41.0%
1920	172		−6.5%
1930	212		23.3%
1940	175		−17.5%
1950	157		−10.3%
1960	138		−12.1%
1970	157		13.8%
1980	164		4.5%
1990	123		−25.0%
2000	153		24.4%
2010	120		−21.6%
2020	148		23.3%
2021 (est.)	152	▲	2.7%

At the 2010 census, there were 120 people, 62 households, and 41 families residing in the borough. The population density was 60 people per square mile (23 people/km^{2}). There were 382 housing units at an average density of 191 units per square mile (74 units/km^{2}). The racial makeup of the borough was 99.2% White and 0.8% Asian. Hispanic or Latino of any race were 0.8% of the population.

Of the 62 households, 8.1% had children under the age of 18 living with them, 59.7% were married couples living together, 4.8% had a female householder with no husband present, and 33.9% were non-families. 33.9% of households were one person, and 17.7% were one person aged 65 or older. The average household size was 1.94 and the average family size was 2.34.

In the borough the population was spread out, with 7.5% under the age of 18, 51.7% from 18 to 64, and 40.8% 65 or older. The median age was 63.3 years.

The median household income was $40,833 and the median family income was $63,750. Males had a median income of $36,250 versus $17,813 for females. The per capita income for the borough was $29,052. None of the families and 3.1% of the population were living below the poverty line.
