= Eric Morris (actor) =

American actor (born 1931)

- Born: November 19, 1931 (age 94); Chicago, Illinois, U.S.
- Education: Sumner School, Chicago; Key Clark Branch school (Chicago); Austin High School (Chicago, Illinois), 1949; Wright Junior College (Chicago); Northwestern University School of Speech
- Occupations: Actor, Acting Teacher, Author
- Years active: 1949–present
- Known for: Eric Morris System of Acting
- Notable work: No Acting Please (book)
- Spouse: Joy (2nd wife)
- Military career
- Allegiance: United States
- Branch: U.S. Army
- Website: ericmorris.com

Eric Morris (born November 19, 1931) is an American actor, acting teacher and author who developed his own theory of acting based on the works of Lee Strasberg and Martin Landau. Morris created the Eric Morris System of Acting, which provides actors with concrete techniques to explore their own psychology as the underlying source of their challenges.

== Early life ==
Morris's parents were Russian Immigrants. His father emigrated from Russia to the United States in 1912. Morris lived with his family in various apartments in a neighborhood inhabited chiefly by Jewish immigrants from Russia or Poland until he was in seventh grade, when his father bought a house.

He spent some years as a Boy Scout, attaining the rank of Star Scout. He was a soda jerk at Walgreens, and at age fourteen spent some Saturdays doing stand-up comedy at a mafia nightclub. After a false start and a detour in therapy, Morris returned to Wright Junior College in 1950 and took up drama. He enrolled at Northwestern University School of Speech in 1952, as a junior theater major. Alvina Krause taught him acting, though he reports she did not like him; he earned a "C" in the class. In 1978 he bought a house at Lake Arrowhead, fulfilling a wish he had made as a ten-year-old in 1941.

== The Eric Morris System ==
Having published over six books in his theory, Morris claims that his System is derived partly from Lee Strasberg's Method Acting. However, Strasberg's Method focuses too much on craft, according to Morris, and not enough on the actor's instrument. Facing struggle in finding truth, he contemplated his theory while heading the Directors Unit at the Actor's Studio in Los Angeles. Morris's method recognizes the fact that actors have emotional blocks, tension, insecurities and other preventions to achieving a fundamental state of being, and works to clear these blocks, rendering the actor truly organic. In this sense, Morris stresses that acting is essentially living and being.

There are seven major obligations to material, according to Morris: Time and Place, Relationship, Emotional Obligation, Character Obligation, Historic Obligation, Thematic Obligation and Subtextual Obligation. After recognizing these seven obligations, there are the choices the actor utilizes to render these emotions, and finally the approach to which the actors use these choices.

The Eric Morris System has received praise from such actors as Jack Nicholson and Johnny Depp.

== Acting career ==
Morris has been acting since 1949. He is an original member of the Screen Actors Guild since 1954. He has worked in over 100 equity plays on stages across the US, including such stages as the Globe Theater and Chicago Rep. Morris has also worked in several television shows, including Lawman, Days of Our Lives, Hogan's Heroes, The New Phil Silvers Show and Fame. Furthermore, Morris has worked in over 25 major motion pictures, including Pork Chop Hill, Battle Beyond the Stars and Mirage.

== Filmography ==
Film
Year	Film	Role	Notes
1957	Monkey on My Back	Soldier	
1959	Holiday for Lovers	Airforce Military Police	Uncredited
1959	A Private's Affair	Orderly	Uncredited
1960	Ma Barker's Killer Brood	Fred Barker	
1969	Strategy of Terror	Tippo	Alternative title: In Darkness Waiting
1976	My Friends Need Killing	Dr. MacLaine	
1980	Battle Beyond the Stars	Feh	
1983	Wavelength	Dr. Vernon Cottrell	
1989	Cipayos (la tercera invasión)	English Colonel	
1995	Mirage	Police captain	
1996	Eye for an Eye	Columnist	
2006	Love Hollywood Style	Psychologist	
Television
Year	Title	Role	Notes
1957	The Silent Service	Soldier	19 episodes, uncredited
1959	Lawman	Joey Young	1 episode
1961	Ben Casey	Patient	1 episode
1961	Dr. Kildare	Doctor	1 episode, uncredited
1963–1964	The New Phil Silvers Show	Stanley	3 episodes, uncredited
1965	Kraft Suspense Theatre	Tippo	2 episodes
1969–1970	Hogan's Heroes	Captain Streicker	2 episodes
1982	Fame	Panel Member	1 episode
1988	Mathnet	Wharfinger	1 episode
1988	Square One Television	Wharfinger	1 episode

== Books ==
- Morris, Eric (2018). A Second Chance at Life: Repairing the Damage You Have Experienced in Your Lives. Los Angeles, CA: Ermor Enterprises. ISBN 978-0983629962.
- Morris, Eric (1998). Being and Doing. Los Angeles, CA: Ermor Enterprises. ISBN 0962970905.
- Morris, Eric (September 1, 2011). Freeing the Actor: An Actor's Desk Reference (PDF). Los Angeles: Ermor Enterprises. ISBN 978-0-9629709-6-2. Archived from the original (PDF) on 2013-12-06.
- Morris, Eric (1988). Acting from the ultimate consciousness. New York, NY: Putnam. ISBN 0399513280. LCCN 87022338.
- Morris, Eric (1988). Acting, Imaging, and the Unconscious. Los Angeles: Ermor Enterprises. ISBN 0-9629709-4-8.
- Morris, Eric (1985). Irreverent acting. New York, NY: Perigee Books. ISBN 0399511393. LCCN 85003378.
- Morris, Eric and Joan Hotchkis (1978). No Acting Please: "Beyond the Method" A Revolutionary Approach to Acting and Living. New York, NY: Whitehouse/Spelling. ISBN 0825699207. LCCN n78068478.
