= Mirage (1995 film) =

- Directed by: Paul Williams
- Written by: James Andronica
- Produced by: Paul Williams
- Starring: Edward James Olmos; Sean Young
- Cinematography: Susan Helen Emerson
- Edited by: Stephen Eckelberry
- Music by: David Campbell
- Release date: 1995
- Running time: 92 minutes
- Country: United States
- Language: English

Mirage is a 1995 action-thriller film directed by Paul Williams and starring Edward James Olmos and Sean Young.

== Plot ==
A detective is hired to follow a man's wife because she keeps getting herself into trouble. She suffers from severe headaches and loss of memory. She never seems to know what's going on. It turns out she has a split personality and the second personality is the one getting her in trouble.

== Cast ==
- Edward James Olmos as Matteo Juarez
- Sean Young as Jennifer Gale
- James Andronica as Lt. Richie Randazzo
- Paul Williams as Donald Gale
- Sayed Badreya as Sayed
- Eric Morris as The Police Captain
- Susan Helen Emerson as Miranda Randazzo
- William Grillo as Carmine Randazzo
- Tony King as Nude Bar Tall Thug

== Reception ==
Emanuel Levy of Variety wrote that "Alfred Hitchcock deserves better than the atrocious homage he gets in Paul Williams' Mirage, an incoherent thriller that can't decide whether to slavishly copy Hitchcock's Vertigo or make a satire out of it. Preposterous plotting and radical changes in tone dictate the fate of this routine B picture as straight-to-video. Closing-night selection of the Palm Springs Film Festival was greeted with laughter and sneers by a bewildered audience."

J. R. Taylor of Entertainment Weekly said that "Ultimately, all this convolution leads to a cliffside climax so amusingly absurd it's worth the rental fee."
