= Maria Dermoût =

Dutch-Indian writer (1888–1962)

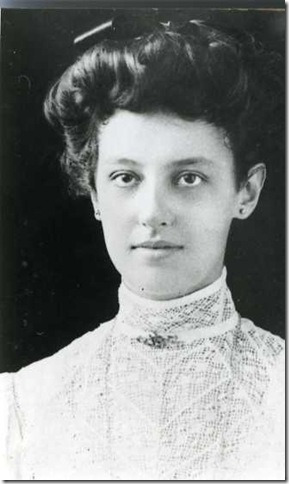
- Maria Dermoût in 1907
- Born: Helena Anthonia Maria Elisabeth Ingerman; 15 June 1888; Pati, Dutch East Indies
- Died: 27 June 1962 (aged 74); The Hague, Netherlands
- Occupation: Novelist

Signature
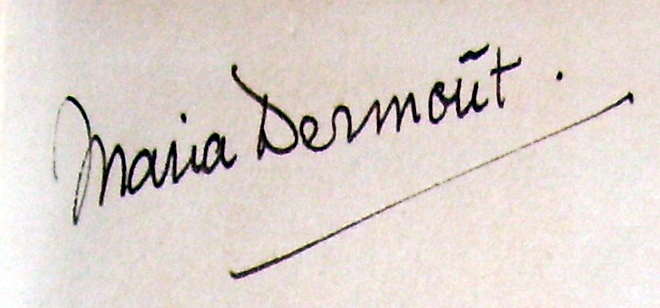

Maria Dermoût (15 June 1888 – 27 June 1962) was an Indo-European novelist, considered one of the greats of Dutch literature and as such an important proponent of Dutch Indies literature. In December 1958 Time magazine praised the translation of Maria Dermoût's The Ten Thousand Things, and named it one of the best books of the year.

Whitney Balliett of The New Yorker wrote:

"Mrs. Dermout, in the manner of Thoreau and the early Hemingway, is an extraordinary sensualist. [...] in passages of a startling, unadorned, three-dimensional clarity; often one can almost touch what she describes."

== Biography ==
Maria Dermoût as a young woman with her husband I.J. Dermoût

Helena Anthonia Maria Elisabeth Ingerman was born on 15 June 1888 on a sugar plantation in Pati, Java, Dutch East Indies, and educated in the Netherlands. She wrote in Dutch. After completing her education she returned to Java, where she married Issac Johannes Dermoût and became known as Maria Dermoût. She travelled extensively across Java and the Moluccas with her husband. In 1933 her husband retired, and the couple settled in the Netherlands. Maria Dermoût was widowed in 1952.

Maria Dermoût died in The Hague on 27 June 1962. She is the subject of the biography Geheim Indië. Het leven van Maria Dermoût 1888-1962 (transl. The Secret East Indies. The Life of Maria Dermoût 1888-1962) in 2000 by the Indo-European (Dutch-Indonesian) author Kester Freriks.

== Body of work ==
Dermoût turned to writing early in life, but remained largely unpublished until she was 63. She wrote two novels, both of which were not published until she was in her sixties: The Ten Thousand Things (De tienduizend dingen, 1955) and Days Before Yesterday — also published as Just Yesterday (Nog pas gisteren, 1951). The English translations of her novels were done by Hans Koning. Some of her short stories were published in translation in magazines such as Vogue during the 1960s. In Dutch, five short-story collections by her were also published.

She is viewed as one of the giants among Dutch-Indies literary writers, and The Ten Thousand Things in particular is widely regarded as an idiosyncratic masterpiece. The book has been translated into thirteen languages. As Hans Koning puts it in his Introduction to the New York Review Books edition of the novel:

"Dermoût was sui generis, a case all her own. She did not write about her Indies as a Dutch woman, or as a Javanese or an Ambonese. Hers was a near-compassionate disdain for the dividing lines, the hatreds and the fears ... She painted landscapes, still lifes and people in a world of myth and mystery."

Although not conventionally autobiographical, both of her novels draw from events in Dermoût's own life. Like the central character in The Ten Thousand Things, Dermoût lost her son in violent circumstances (he died in a Japanese prisoner-of-war camp). The reminiscences of Javanese childhood experiences described in Days Before Yesterday are based on, but do not mirror, her own childhood in the tropics.

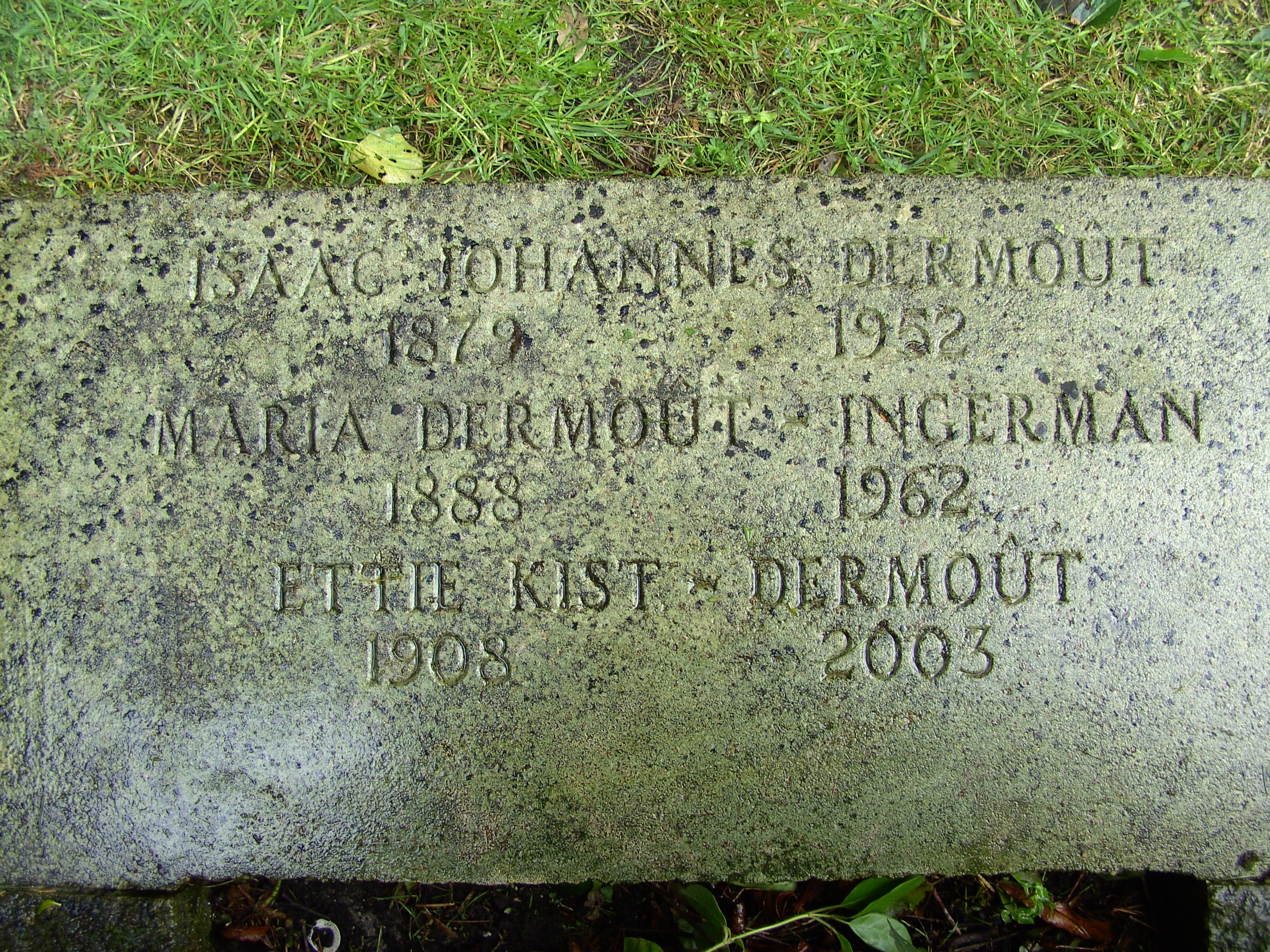
Dermoût's grave headstone in Noordwijk General Cemetery

Author Oek de Jong appropriately wrote:

"Still, Maria Dermoût an author for the happy few. Is she a writer's writer? Certainly not. She is a storyteller par excellence. Her stories are subtle, but they are also accessible. Nonetheless she remains an author for the happy few, equal to the greats of Dutch prose, but much less known than they are. There are many reasons for her modest literary reputation: her own modesty, the small body of her work, the brevity of her literary career. But it is mainly her work itself that is the cause. It possesses something that wards off hordes of readers, yet still manages to attract a handful, who then embrace it and spread the word of its exquisite nature. The shell seekers among the readers, the slow walkers, those who stop and turn and bend over to pick up that one beautiful shell - they recognize her extraordinary work."

The cultural historian Paul M. M. Doolan suggested that Dermoût’s two novels "are works of nostalgia – evoking an aching memory that is a bittersweet longing for something impossible to retrieve." He concludes that "Dermoût’s work represents decolonization as a rupture with the past, the incomprehensible loss of one’s place. It brings with it the challenge to remember, to accept and to go on living. But this act of remembering, as an instrument of unremembering, did nothing to help explore why, suddenly (seemingly), in the years from 1945 to 1949, the native population of Indonesia had turned against their European (Indisch) leaders and the Indisch community had discovered themselves to be strangers in the place they considered their own."
