= Eagles Mere Historic District =

Historic district in Pennsylvania, United States

- U.S. National Register of Historic Places
- U.S. Historic district
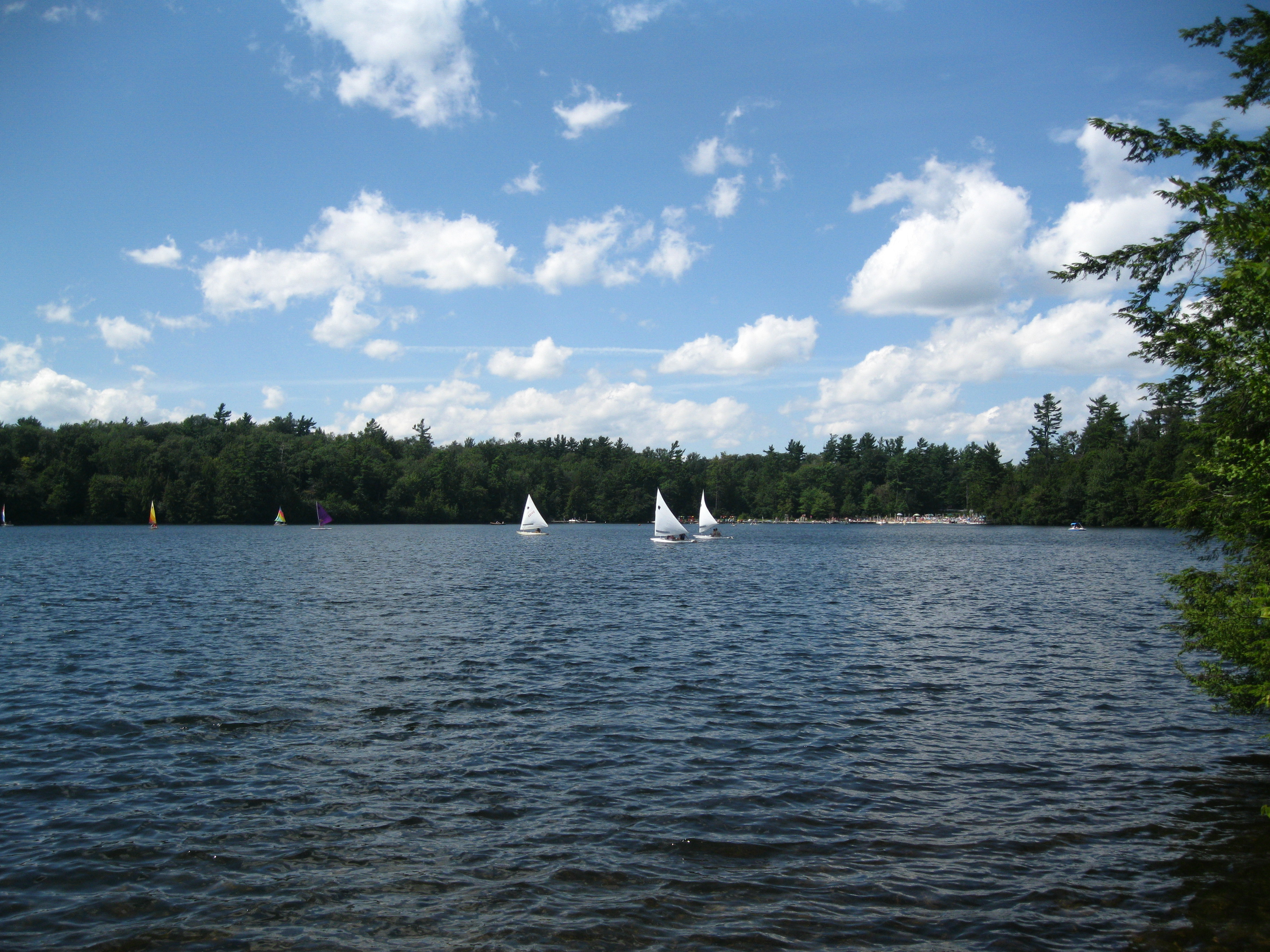
- Eagles Mere Lake

- Location within Pennsylvania Location within the United States
- Location: Roughly bounded by PA 42, Borough boundary, Loyalsock State Forest & Eagles Mere Golf Club; Eagles Mere and Shrewsbury Township, Pennsylvania
- Coordinates: 41°25′02″N 76°34′36″W
- Area: 570 acres (230 ha)
- Built: 1885
- Architect: Multiple
- Architectural style: Queen Anne, Bungalow/craftsman, Prairie School
- NRHP reference No.: 96000718; 13000745
- Added to NRHP: June 28, 1996

Eagles Mere Historic District is a national historic district in the mountain lake resort of Eagles Mere in Shrewsbury Township, Sullivan County, Pennsylvania. The resort area was founded in the late nineteenth century and popular through the first half of the twentieth century. It surrounds Eagles Mere Lake.

== Architecture and history ==
The kidney-shaped Eagles Mere Lake ("Lake" here is redundant but common vernacular) covers 230 acres and is about 3/4 mile long. It is a natural spring-fed lake with exceptionally clear water in the Allegheny Mountains at an elevation of 2100 feet. Early resort promoters prohibited construction and tree cutting within 100 feet of the lake to protect the shoreline. The shoreline continues to be forested and is now owned by the Eagles Mere Association. Pristine forested areas with hiking trails surround the lake, and they are in turn surrounded by several thousand acres of more forest.

The village sits at the south end of the lake; there is a small beach at the north end. Just north of the beach is the neighborhood called Eagles Mere Park. This neighborhood developed out of a Chatauqua which lasted from 1897 to 1902. The twelve houses of the original Chatauqua are still extant and 42 similar houses were built before 1930.

The district includes 234 contributing buildings, 1 contributing site, and 6 contributing structures in the resort community of Eagles Mere. The buildings date to the late-19th and early-20th century and include cottages, boat houses, commercial buildings, churches, and outbuildings. Cottage architecture reflects a number of popular styles including Queen Anne, Bungalow / American craftsman, and Prairie School. Notable non-residential buildings include the "beach house" (1890), Flora Villa Inn (1892), Eagles Mere Inn (1887), "The Crestmont" (1926), former Post Office (1902), Miller Drug Store (1903), Sweet Shop (1885), Eagles Mere Fire Company and Community Hall (1942), St. Johns-in-the-Wilderness Episcopal Church, and St. Francis of Assisi Catholic Church (1905, 1916, 1923).

It was added to the National Register of Historic Places in 1996.

== Gallery ==
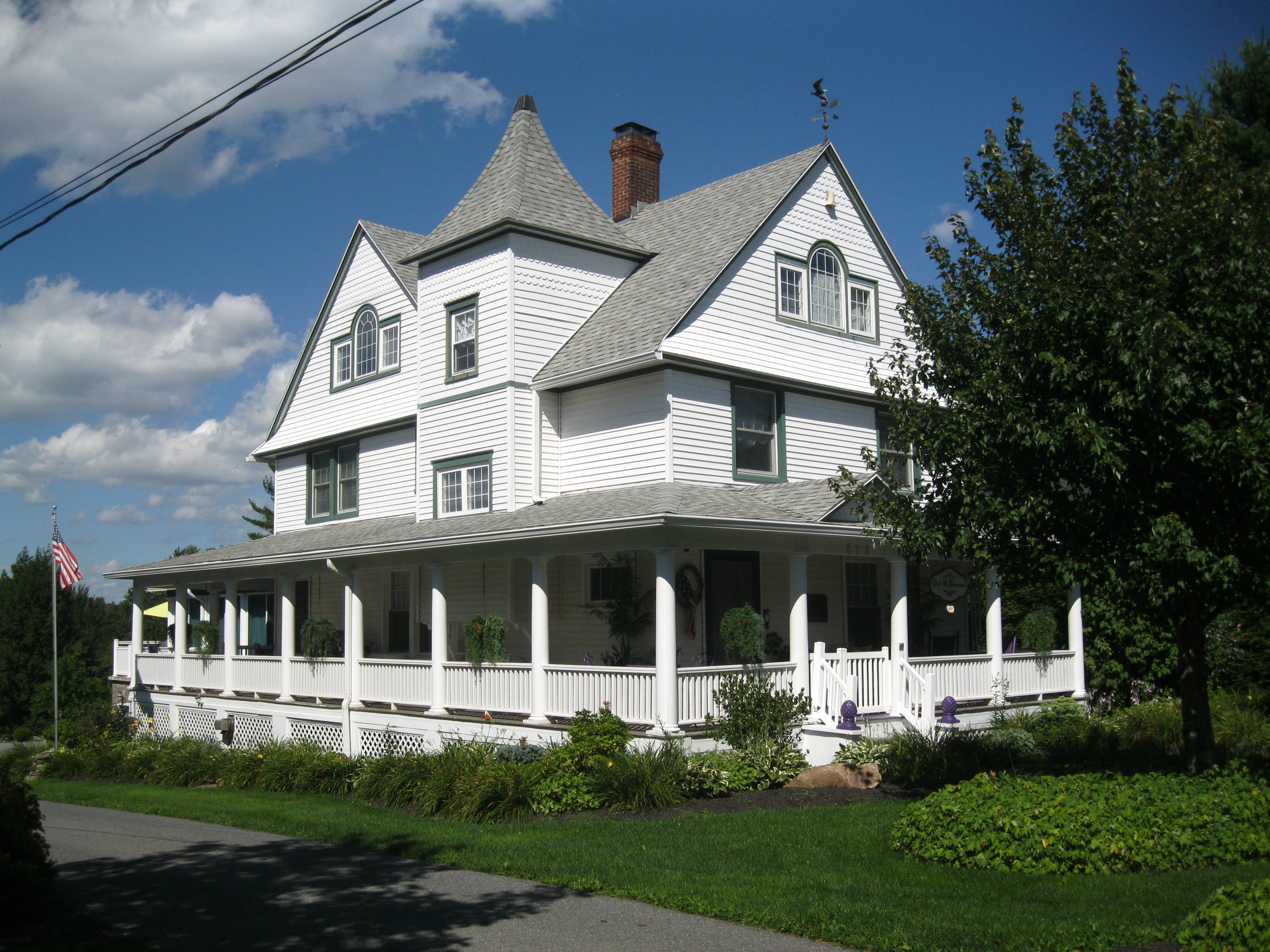

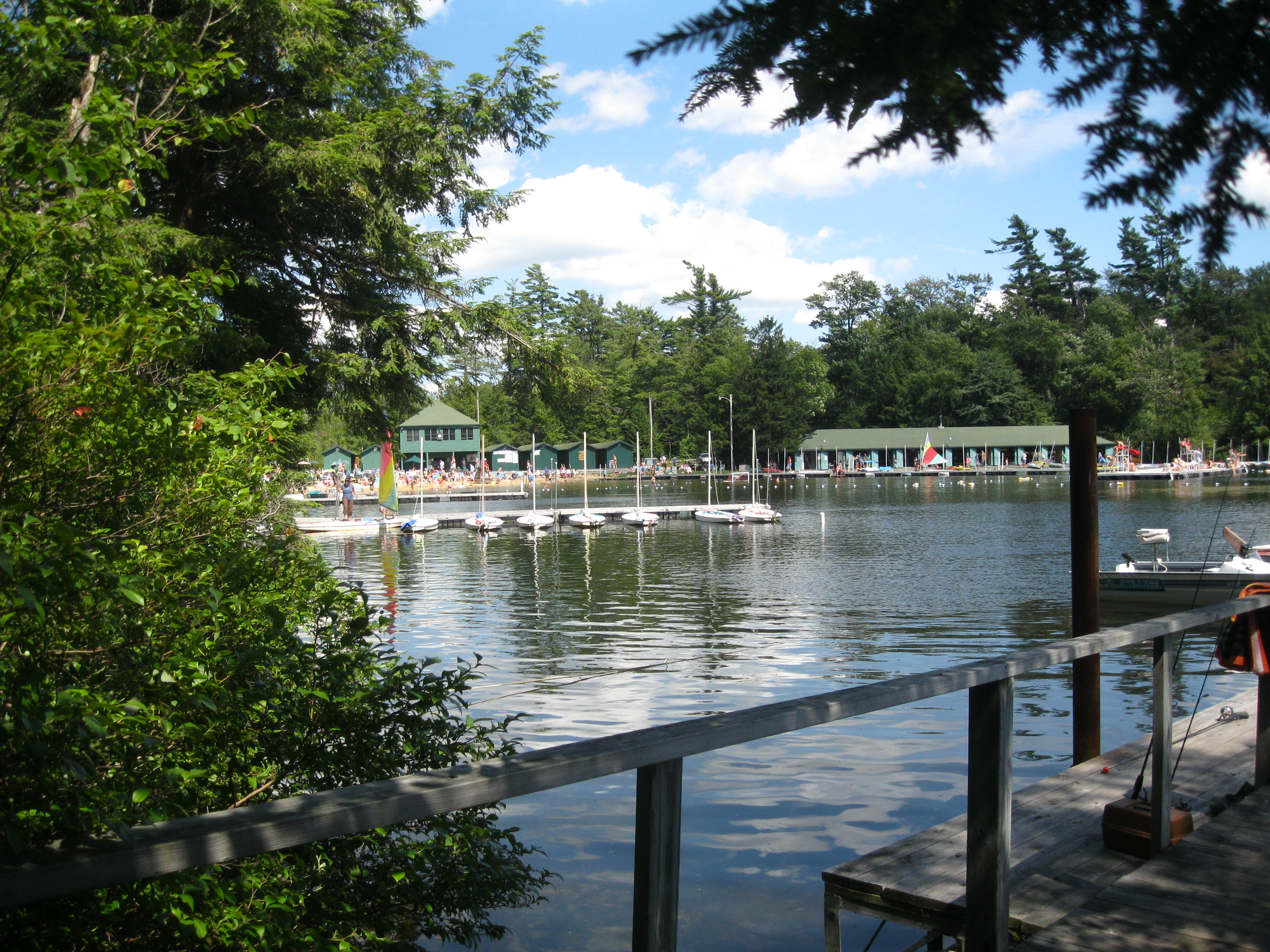

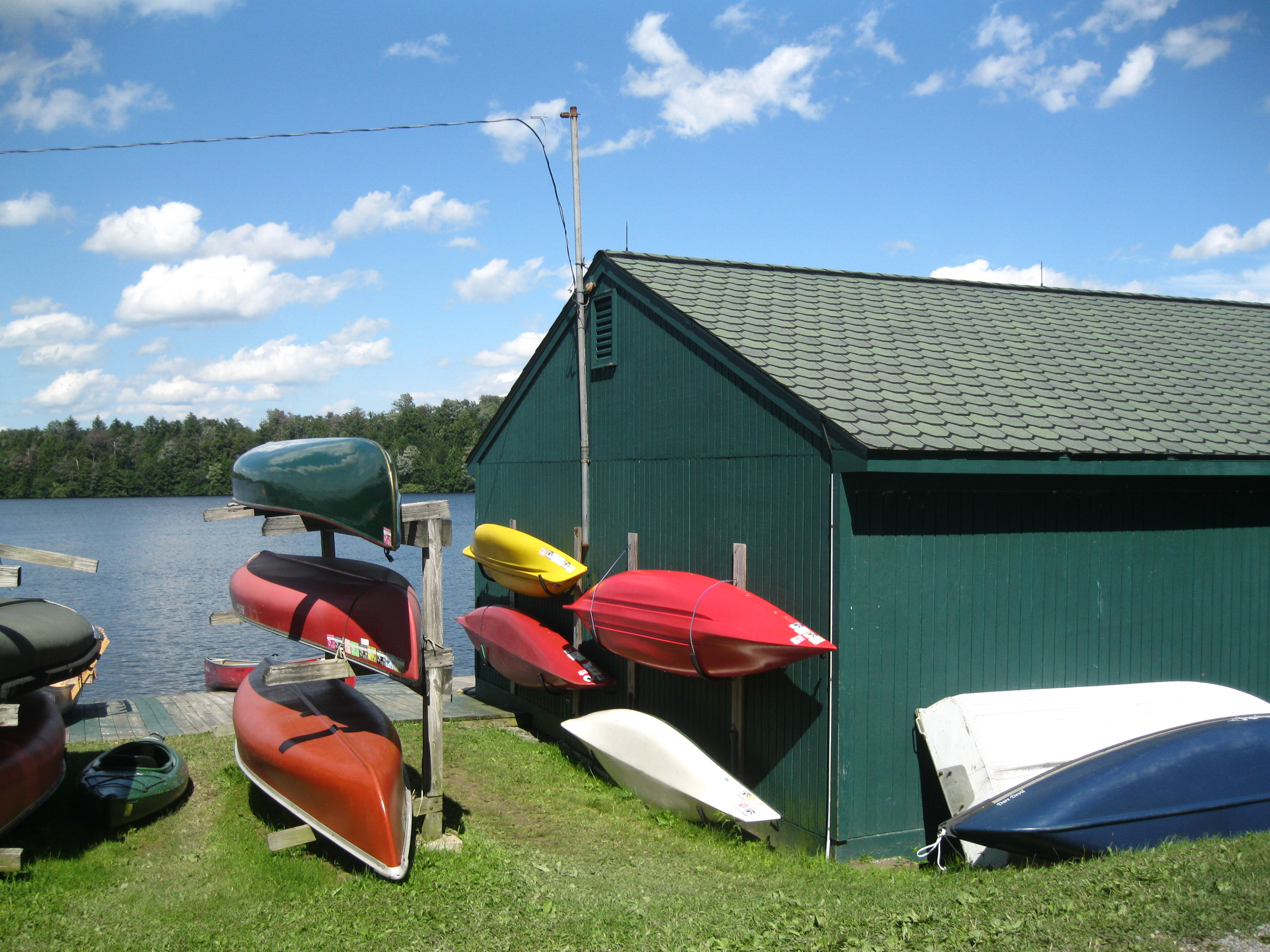

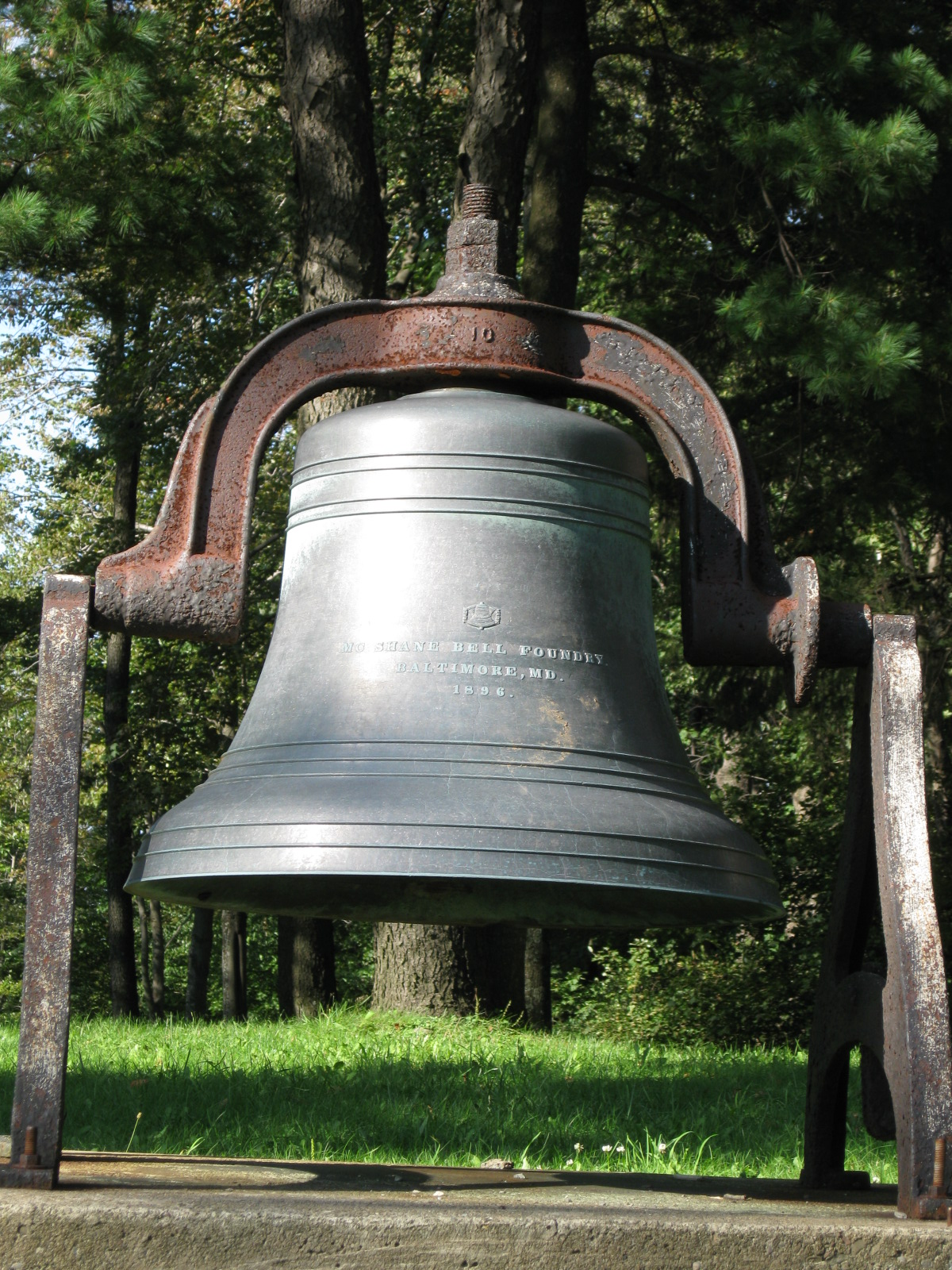

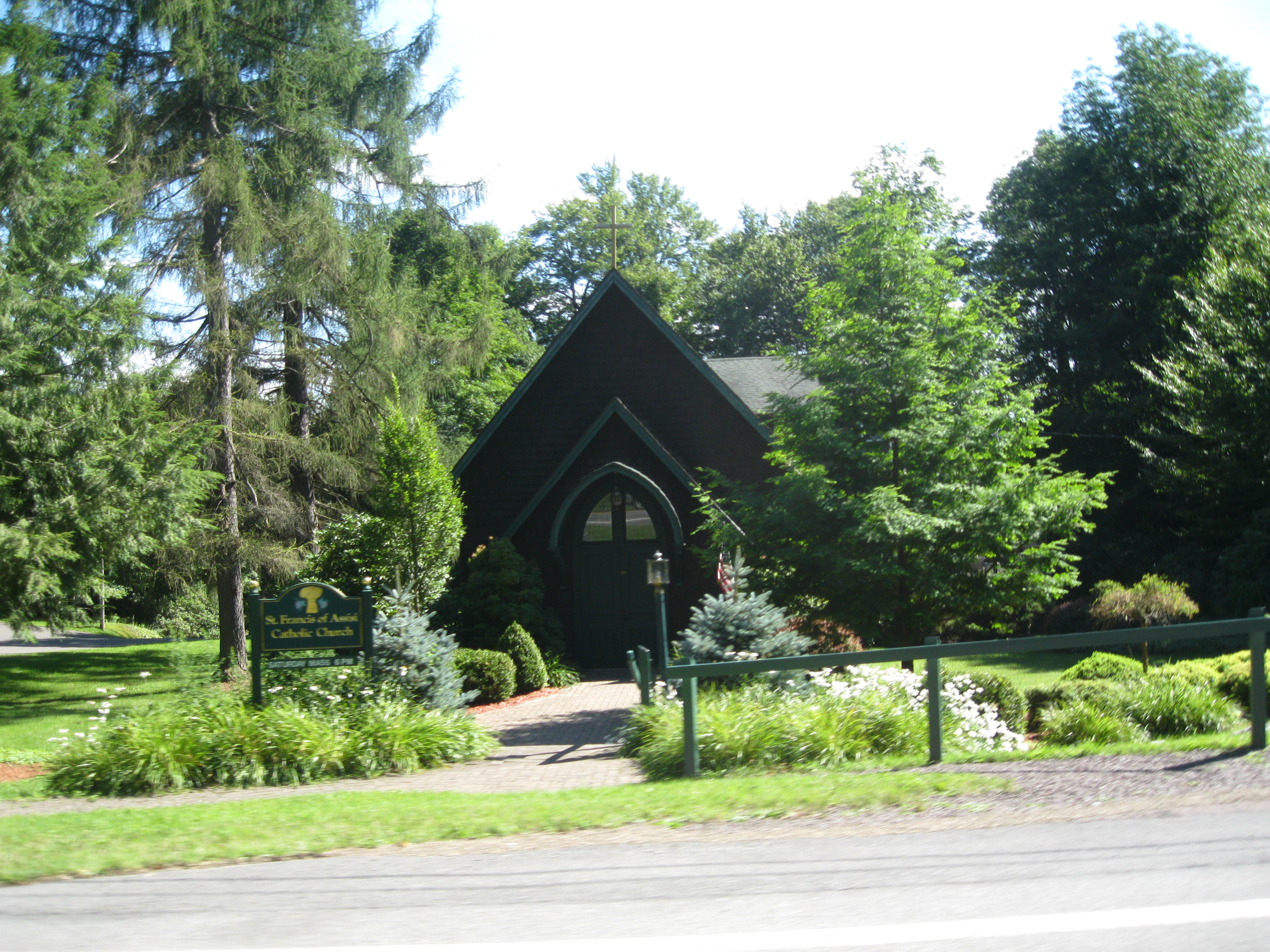
St. Francis of Assisi Church

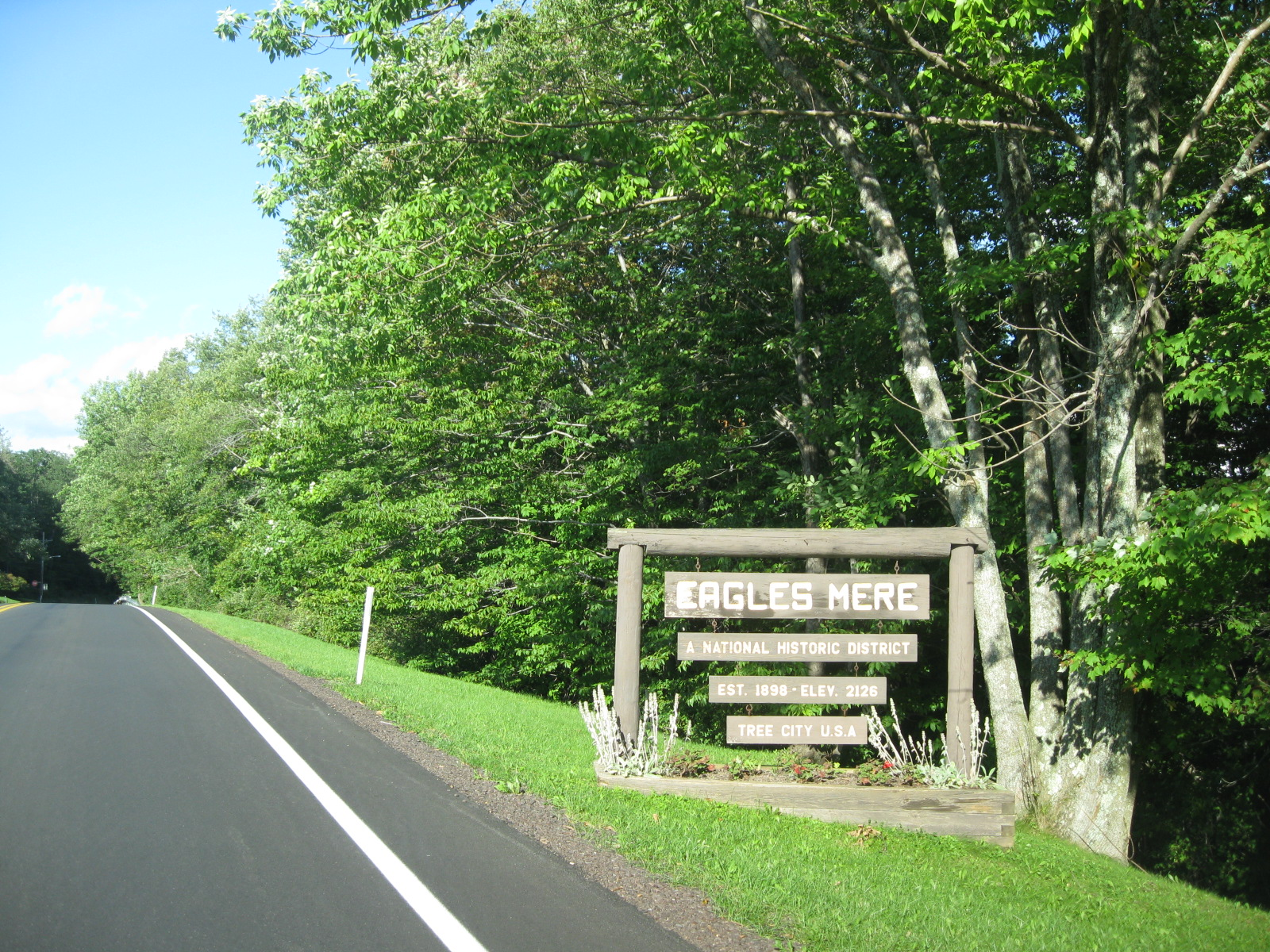
Eagles Mere Historic District Sign

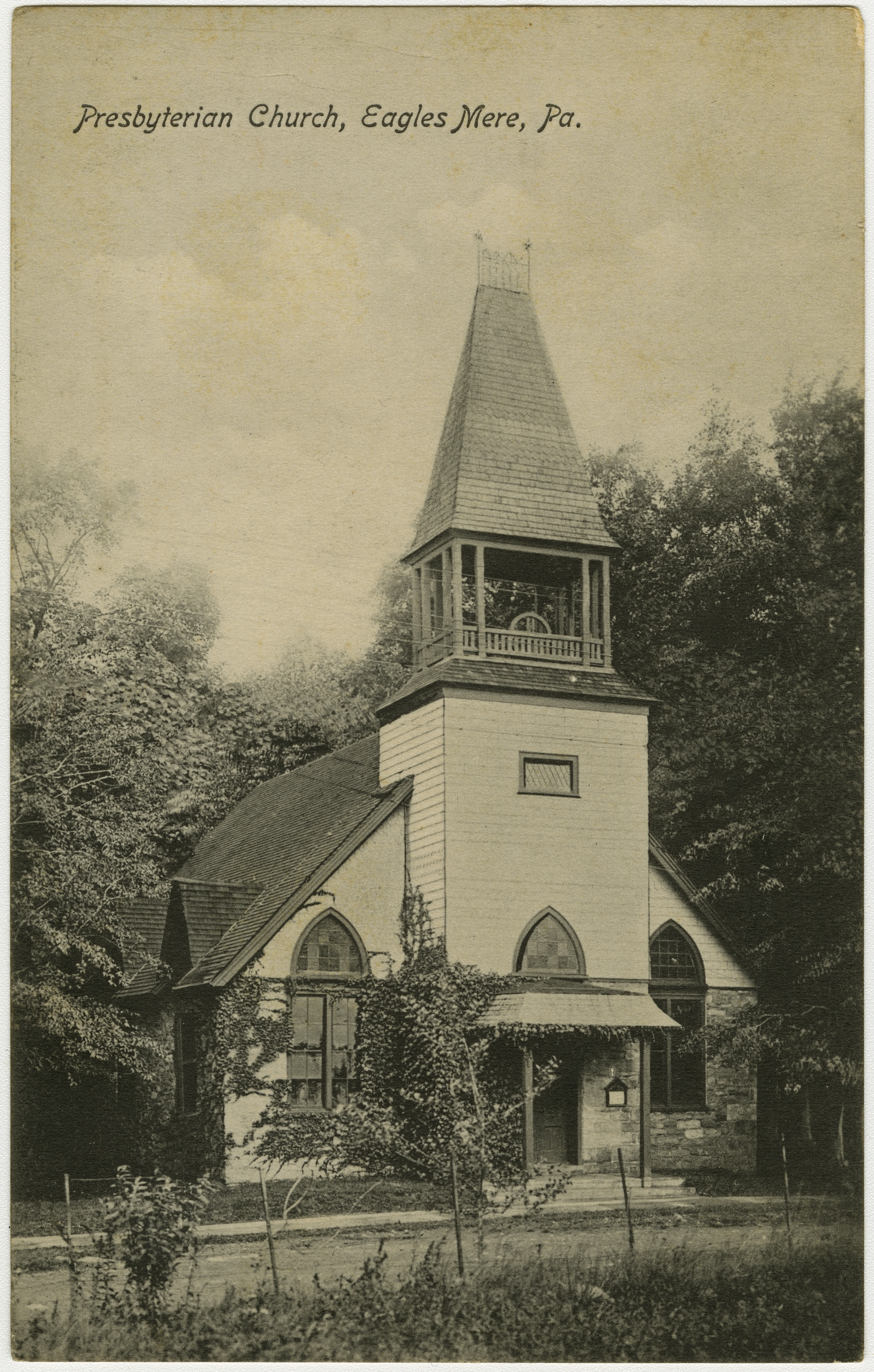
Presbyterian Church on an old postcard

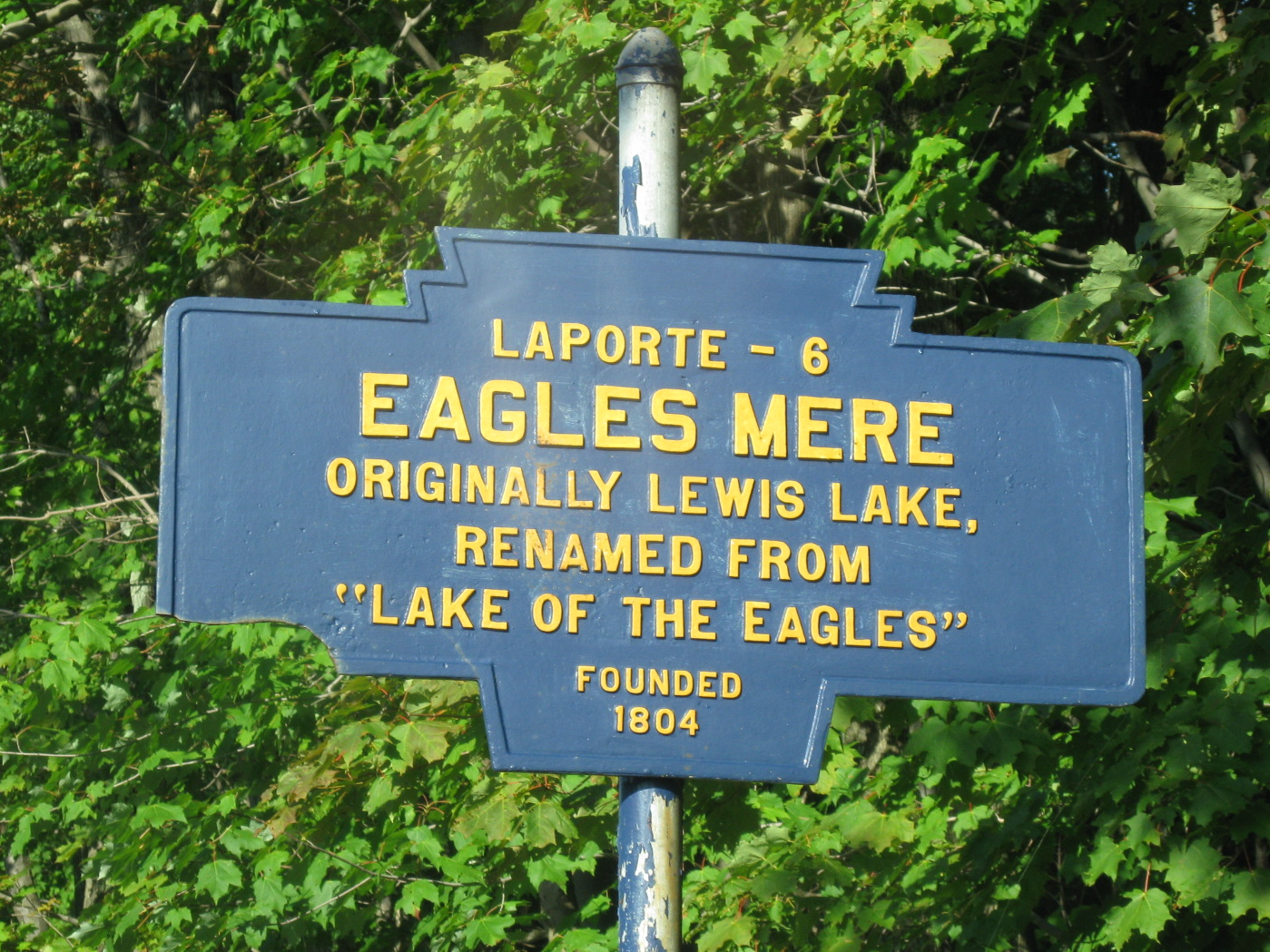
Keystone marker

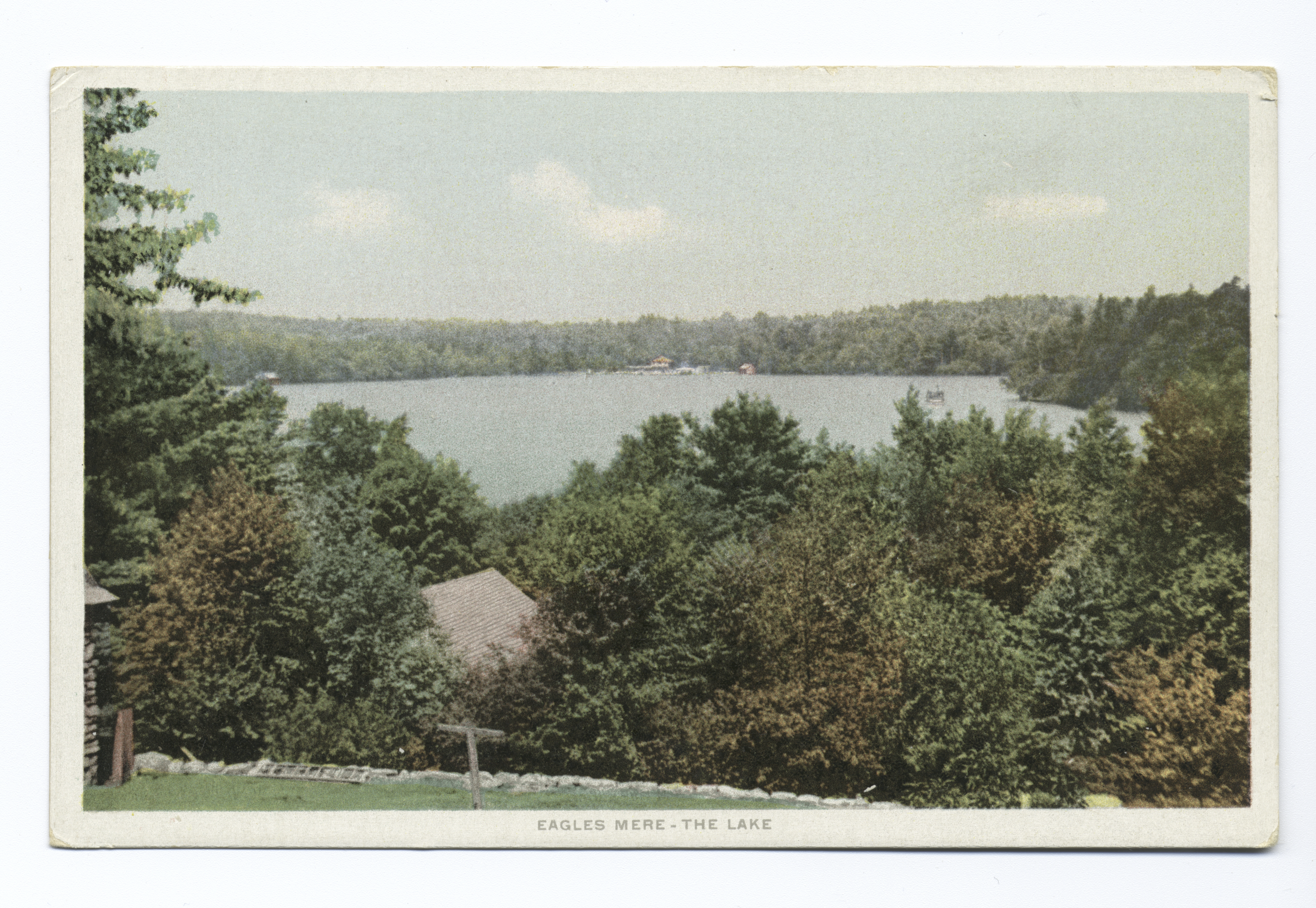
Early view of the lake
