= Paul Williams (director) =

American actor and director

Paul Williams (born 1943), often credited as P.W. Williams, is an American director, writer, producer and actor best known for directing a series of films in the late-1960s to early-1970s exploring counterculture life: Out of It (1969), The Revolutionary (1970) and Dealing: Or the Berkeley-to-Boston Forty-Brick Lost-Bag Blues (1972). He also directed Nunzio for Universal (1975), "Miss Right" (1981) for Sony, "Mirage" (1990), and "The November Men" (1994).

== Career ==
In 1966, Williams, along with Edward Pressman, was a founding partner of Pressman Williams Enterprises which produced such films as Terrence Malick's first film Badlands and Brian DePalma's early films Sisters and Phantom of the Paradise. As an actor, he appeared in films that he also directed including The November Men (1994) and Mirage (1996).

Williams produced his daughter's, Zoe Clarke-Williams, first film Men and directed The Best Ever in 2001. He spent years (2001–2003) preparing And the Walls Came Tumbling Down, a film about Pope John Paul II and his role in the fall of Communism in Western Europe. The film was ultimately abandoned.

In 2015, Waterside Press published Williams' book about perception, extraordinary experience and the digital photographic process, Image of a Spirit.

In the fall of 2017, The Orchard released his production of "The Amazing Adventure of Marchello the Cat", a feature film made with no cast other than live cats.

== Filmography ==
- Girl (1967) (short) – writer, director, producer
- Out of It (1969) – writer, director
- The Revolutionary (1970) – director
- Dealing: Or the Berkeley-to-Boston Forty-Brick Lost-Bag Blues (1972) – director, writer, actor
- Tracks (1976) – actor
- Nunzio (1978) – director, actor
- Miss Right (1982) – story, director, actor
- Can She Bake a Cherry Pie? (1983) – actor
- To Heal a Nation (1988) – actor
- The November Men (1993) – director, producer, actor
- Mirage (1995) – director, producer, actor
- Movies Money Murder (1996) – actor
- Greater Than a Tiger (1997) (short) – actor
- Men (1997) – producer, actor
- Charades (1998) – producer
- The Best Ever (2002) – writer, director, producer
- A Cat's Tale (2008) – producer
