= The Ten Thousand Things =

Novel by Maria Dermoût

First edition

The Ten Thousand Things (original Dutch: De Tienduizend Dingen, 1955) is a novel by the Indo-European novelist and writer Maria Dermoût. The story is a rich tapestry of family life against the exotic, tropical background of the Molucca Islands of Indonesia. Although never explicitly stated, the main setting is probably Ambon Island. The story is structured along geographical themes with four major divisions: the Island itself, the Inner Bay, the Outer Bay, and again the Island. Dermout's omniscient narrator is attempting to make sense of the whole generational saga by carefully reflecting on the wonder of this world while revealing some of the horrible evils that the characters commit. After the publication of the English translation by Hans Koning, Time magazine listed it as one of the best books of 1958.

The title of the book is indirectly derived from the poem Xinxin Ming, which is traditionally (although, according to modern scholarship, probably falsely) attributed to the Third Chinese Chán (Zen) patriarch Sengcan, as quoted by Aldous Huxley in The Perennial Philosophy "When the ten thousand things have been seen in their unity, we return to the beginning and remain where we have always been".

== Characters ==
This is a list of a few characters from the novel

- Felicia, arguably the main character as most of novel focuses on her
- Felicia's Grandmother, whose name is never mentioned, but with whom she lives with in their home in Indonesia. She strongly believes that everything has its place, and that one should not mess or displace nature.
- Felicia's son Himpies, whose name is changed to allow him to better to fit in in Indonesia (he was originally called Willem, the dutch version of the name William)
- the bibi, who tries to make deals and trade with Felicia and her Grandmother, but is send away later for bringing "pearls from the Sea", which the Grandmother argues only belong in the Sea, by displacing the pearls she is not respecting nature.
- Felicia's parents and her husband. Although not clear, it is assumed he is German, because of Felicia's German sounding surname
- Sjeba, a housemaid at the House with the Small Garden. She is afraid of the bibi. She does not get a lot of attention within the book, which has been argued to be a form of orientalism (being seen not heard)
- Constance, she works in the Commissioners household. Her husband is said to have run away and therefore she has relations with several men on the island.
- The Sailor, who had a short relationship with Constance, yet left a lasting impression.
- Pauline, who works as a cook and is afraid of "the Sailor and is knife".
- The Professor, a Scottish man who either has trouble speaking out his Javanese assistants name, or pretends to have trouble. He seeks to rediscover Indonesian botany.
- Raden Suprapto, the Javanese assistant. It's difficult to tell whether he likes or dislikes the professor.

Many characters never meet, because they only interact with characters in their own chapters, but do not appear elsewhere. In the last chapter, a few of these characters do finally meet, binding the novel together.

== Literary Elements ==
=== Themes ===
The Small Garden, which is actually not that small. It possesses supernatural powers. With its personification and constant reappearance within the novel, it could have also been the title of the book.

Nature, of which the Small Garden is a sub-theme of. Not only are the chapters split into sections of the island (e.g Two: at the inner bay), but there is constant description of this islands nature.

Love, romantic love within the novel is rarely successful (Felicity does not live with her husband, Constance has many suitors but less luck with anything long term, the Commissioner although married to more than one woman, also proves this). However, families do love each other. Felicity relies on her Grandmother and only wants the best for her son. Pauline is quite fond of Constance. This could lead back to nature, characters must lead nature take its course, they cannot force anything.

== Critical reception ==
The book received many positive reviews. Time wrote: "In translation the book is an uncommon reading experience, an offbeat narrative that has the timeless tone of legend... The Ten Thousand Things are the fragments that make up life's substance, and to go on living, however maddeningly arranged the fragments may be, is itself a valid action. Spelled out against the rich, colorful background that author Dermout knows so well and handles so effectively, this is an affirmation that emerges with an oddly insistent, compelling effect." Reviewing the 2002 English edition, Publishers Weekly remarked "Dermout beautifully depicts the idyllic setting and handles the darker aspects of the story — ghosts, superstition, even murder — with equal skill."

== Translations ==
The book has been translated into 11 different languages.

- Arabic, De tienduizend dingen 2005
- Chinese Wanwu you ling 2009
- Danish De Titusinde Ting 1959
- English The Ten Thousand Things 1958 (2 editions), 1983, 1984, 2002
- French Les Dix Mille Choses 1959
- German Die zehntausend Dinge 1959
- Icelandic Frúin í Litlagardi 1960
- Indonesian Taman kate-kate 1975
- Italian Le diecimila cose 1959
- Spanish Las diez mil cosas 1959, 2006
- Swedish De tiotusen tingen 1958
