= Alvina Krause =

American theatre director

- Born: January 28, 1893; New Lisbon, Wisconsin, US
- Died: December 31, 1981 (aged 88); Bloomsburg, Pennsylvania, US
- Resting place: New Lisbon City Cemetery
- Monuments: Alvina Krause Theater, New York; Alvina Krause Theatre, Bloomsburg; Alvina Krause Studio, Northwestern
- Education: University of Wisconsin, attended; Cumnock School of Oratory, 1916; Northwestern University School of Speech, Bachelors in Science 1928; Northwestern University Graduate School, Masters in Science 1933
- Occupation: acting teacher
- Title: Professor emeritus
- Partner: Lucy McCammon (?-1981)
- Awards: honorary doctorate, Doane College, 1969

Alvina Krause (January 28, 1893 – December 31, 1981) was an American drama teacher at Northwestern University, theatrical entrepreneur, "maker of stars", and director. Her students called her AK. Her first name is pronounced Al-vine-na.

== Personal life ==
As a girl in rural Wisconsin she found a copy of Hamlet (one source says A Doll's House), and was smitten with a love of dramatic literature, even though an older sister teased her for mispronouncing many of the words. As a high school senior, she dismissed her first marriage proposal, vowing to seek a career. After a stint at University of Wisconsin, she found her way to Evanston.

In her first year at the Cumnock school she was thrilled and intimidated when its founder (later professor at Northwestern) addressed the new class.

Krause's life partner was her former student, Lucy McCammon (August 12, 1898–December 19, 1991), born to a family prominent in Springfield, Missouri. McCammon taught physical education at Bloomsburg State College (1926-1958). From 1971, the two women shared a house in Bloomsburg, Pennsylvania.

== Professional life ==
After high school, she attended the Cumnock Oratorical School, 1914–1916. After graduation, she taught elocution and girls' athletics in high schools in Colorado and Springfield, Missouri.

She returned to Northwestern, earning a bachelor's degree in 1928. She taught drama and English at a high school in Seaside, Oregon, where some of her family lived. She coached the girls' basketball team to a state championship. She taught drama for a year at Hamline University in St. Paul. Her student group from Hamline performed so well at a drama festival in Evanston, that Northwestern hired her.

In 1930, Northwestern appointed her an Instructor of Voice and Interpretation in the School of Speech. She earned a master's degree there in 1933; her master's thesis (A Study of Creative Imagination) purported to describe the creative process scientifically. Her principal duties were giving private lessons in voice and interpretation. Budget considerations led the School of Speech to discontinue private instruction in the early 1940s. She was appointed assistant professor in 1941, and developed a one-year course in acting. She expanded this to a three-year acting program, developing an approach still used at Northwestern and emulated elsewhere. In 1957 she was appointed associate professor.

Krause was the artistic director and driving force for summer theater at Eagles Mere, Pennsylvania, for twenty years from 1945 producing 178 plays by Chekhov, Ibsen, Molière, Rostand, Shakespeare, and Shaw. It drew scouts from movie studios and the professional stage. Over spring break in 1945, she and Miss McCammon (who taught physical education at nearby Bloomsburg State Teachers College) leased the Forest Inn Playhouse. (Ethel Barrymore's daughter Ethel Barrymore Colt had performed there.) Each summer, AK invited some of her Northwestern acting students to Eagles Mere. She herself acted in two productions. The students acted and produced the plays, sewed costumes, sold tickets door to door, cooked, cleaned, and controlled the bat and mouse population. They featured performers such as Patricia Neal, Jimmy Gheen, Charlton Heston, Jennifer Jones, Paula Prentiss, and Richard Benjamin. The legacy remained in a nationally recognized summer drama workshop Dewire Community Center, as of 1993.

Northwestern forced her to retire in 1961, but in the face of alumni protest they let her stay on for two years as a part-time lecturer. In 1963 she retired as professor emeritus.

She founded a repertory company at Chicago's Harper Theatre in 1966. It achieved critical acclaim in its first season (for Six Characters in Search of an Author, The Physicists, Too True To Be Good), but failed.

She enjoyed great popularity even in retirement, and students engaged her for private instruction. She conducted master classes as late as 1976 and 1977. She had moved to Bloomsburg in 1971, and some of her former master class students founded the Bloomsburg Theater Ensemble in 1978. They engaged the 83-year-old Krause as artistic advisor, and later artistic director. In the summer of 1981 she directed Lady Audley's Secret, a 19th-century play, there.

Despite Karuse's accolades, some of her former students have been critical of her methodology, including former student Karen Black, who reported in a 2013 HuffPost interview, "Alvina Krause would not validate and would not allow. I think she had favorites, and you could never figure out why you weren't a favorite, and it never made any sense."

== Students ==
- Richard Benjamin (1959)
- Karen Black
- William Daniels
- David A. Downs, Northwestern faculty
- Gerald Freedman
- Penny Fuller
- George Furth
- Frank Galati
- Charlton Heston (C45)
- Ronald Holgate
- Jeffrey Hunter
- Corrine Jacker
- Jennifer Jones
- Martha Kemper
- Walter Kerr
- Lucy McCammon
- Billie McCants
- Garry Marshall (J56)
- Marshall Mason
- Eric Morris
- Patricia Neal (C47, H94)
- Agnes Nixon
- James Olson
- Marcus Overton (actor, director, writer, critic) (BS Schl Speech NU 65)
- Paula Prentiss (1960)
- Lawrence Pressman
- Ralph S. Purdum
- Robert Reed
- Tony Roberts (1961)
- Inga Swenson
- Neal Weaver
- Laird Williamson
- Helen Wood
- Joy Zinoman, founder of Studio Theatre (Washington, D.C.)
