= A Walk with Love and Death =

1969 film directed by John Huston

- Theatrical poster
- Directed by: John Huston
- Screenplay by: Dale Wasserman
- Based on: A Walk with Love and Death (1961 novel) by Hans Koningsberger
- Produced by: Carter DeHaven
- Starring: Anjelica Huston; Assi Dayan
- Cinematography: Edward Scaife
- Edited by: Russell Lloyd
- Music by: Georges Delerue
- Production company: 20th Century Fox
- Distributed by: 20th Century Fox
- Release date: October 5, 1969
- Running time: 90 minutes
- Country: United States
- Language: English
- Budget: $2,410,000

A Walk with Love and Death is a 1969 American historical drama film directed by John Huston, starring Anjelica Huston (in her screen debut) and Assi Dayan. Based on the 1961 novel by Hans Koningsberger, the film is about the relationship of a female aristocrat and a male student amidst the Jacquerie uprising in 14th-century France.

It was released by 20th Century Fox on October 5, 1969.

== Plot ==
The story is set at the time of the 1358 uprising of the peasants of northern France known as the Jacquerie. Heron of Fois, a student from Paris, crosses territory devastated by the upheaval and the ferocious reprisals of the nobility. He meets with Claudia, the aristocratic daughter of a royal official killed by the peasants, and they attempt to reach Calais. In the novel, Heron's intended final destination is Oxford University while in the film "the sea" less specifically comes to represent an abstract freedom. While differing in their views of the Jacquerie – Heron sympathises with the exploited peasantry, and Claudia sees their rising as mindless savagery – the young couple become lovers. In the end, they fail to escape the chaotic violence around them but await death "strangely happy – we had stopped running from them and we had our hour".

== Cast ==
- Anjelica Huston as Claudia
- Assi Dayan as Heron of Fois
- Anthony Higgins as Robert of Loris
- John Hallam as Sir Meles
- Robert Lang as Pilgrim Leader
- Guy Deghy as Priest
- Michael Gough as Mad Monk
- George Murcell as Captain
- Eileen Murphy as Romani Girl
- Anthony Nicholls as Father Superior
- Joseph O'Conor as Pierre of St. Jean
- John Huston as Robert the Elder
- John Franklyn as Whoremaster
- Francis Heim as Knight Lieutenant
- Melvyn Hayes as First Entertainer
- Barry Keegan as Peasant Leader
- Nicholas Smith as Pilgrim
- Antoinette Reuss as Charcoal Woman
- Gilles Ségal and Med Hondo as Entertainers
- Dieter Tressler as Majordomo

== Production ==
The film marked the screen debut of John Huston's daughter Anjelica Huston. It also marked the English-language debut of Israeli actor Assi Dayan, son of Moshe Dayan, who was credited as Assaf Dayan. John Huston plays the role of Robert the Elder, a noble who defects to the rebels.

Anjelica Huston had been in the running to play Juliet Capulet in director Franco Zeffirelli's adaptation of Romeo and Juliet, but John Huston withdrew her from consideration when he decided to cast her as Claudia in A Walk with Love and Death. Huston felt that she was wrong for the role, and has commented on the experience that her father "miscast me first time out and I think he realized that. I was ready to act, but I wasn't ready to act for him...I was difficult, I didn't want to act with no makeup, although I'd have done it for Franco." Father and daughter had a fractious relationship on set, with the young Anjelica's having difficulty learning her lines and focusing, and her father grew more impatient and angry at directing her.

Filming took place on-location in Italy and Austria.

=== Music ===
The musical score was by the French composer Georges Delerue. It incorporated medieval folk music themes, making extensive use of lute, harpsichord, and recorders.

== Box office ==
The film was not a box-office success, but John Huston noted in his autobiography An Open Book (1980) that it was highly praised in France, where there was a greater understanding of the historical context.

According to Fox records, the film required $3,900,000 in rentals to break even and by 11 December 1970 had made $825,000. In September 1970, the studio reported it had lost $1,637,000 on the film.

== Reception ==
Some contemporary reviewers considered that the film held up the past as a mirror of the events of 1968, when it was made. Comparisons were variously made with the Vietnam War or the Paris rioting of May/June that year, which required filming to be relocated to Austria and Italy. However a recent and detailed analysis of both the original novel by Hans Koningsberger and film by the essayist Peter G. Christensen concludes that the story is literally a period one, intended to evoke the turbulence of its 14th-century setting rather than illustrating cultural or generational issues of the late 1960s.

== See also ==
- List of American films of 1969
