= Beau Starr =

American actor (1944–2026)

- Born: September 1, 1944; New York City, U.S.
- Died: April 24, 2026 (aged 81); Vancouver, British Columbia, Canada
- Occupation: Actor
- Years active: 1979–2007, 2013
- Relatives: Mike Starr

Beau William Starr (September 1, 1944 – April 24, 2026) was an American actor who starred in film and television. He is known for his film role as Sheriff Ben Meeker in the 1988 horror film Halloween 4: The Return of Michael Myers; he reprised his role in the 1989 sequel Halloween 5: The Revenge of Michael Myers.

== Early life ==
Beau William Starr was born in Queens, New York City, on September 1, 1944. His younger brother is actor Mike Starr. Before Starr became an actor he was a professional football player known as Bill Starr. Primarily a tight end, he played college football for the Hofstra Pride and was signed by the New York Jets, with whom he served on the taxi squad for three seasons. He later played in the Canadian Football League with the Montreal Alouettes and the Hamilton Tiger-Cats.

== Career ==
In 1980, Starr acted in the play The Set-Up at The American Theatre of Actors.

Starr's well-known television role was in the 1990s Canadian television series Due South as Lieutenant Harding Welsh of The Chicago Police Department. He also starred in the 1980s television series Rituals, Bizarre and True Blue. He has starred in several made-for-television movies, and appeared in a number of productions based in Canada, including Due South, Sue Thomas: F.B.Eye and Doc as well as some advertisements.

His first feature film role was in the 1982 comedy film Hanky Panky with Gene Wilder and Gilda Radner. He also appeared in Carl Reiner's 1987 comedy Summer School, Martin Scorsese's hit 1990 crime drama Goodfellas as Henry Hill's father, and in the 2005 drama Cinderella Man. Starr made many guest appearances on television series, including T.J. Hooker, The A-Team, Knight Rider, Hill Street Blues, V: The Series, Hunter, Wings, The 4400, A Nero Wolfe Mystery and NYPD Blue.

== Death ==
Starr died at his home in Vancouver, Canada, on April 24, 2026, at the age of 81.

== CFL statistics ==
Year	Team	Receiving					
Year	Team	G	Rec	Yds	Avg	Lng	TD
1969	Montreal Alouettes	14	51	686	13.5	66	1
1970	Hamilton Tiger-Cats	4	7	134	19.1	38	1
Total		20	58	820	14.1	66	2

== Filmography ==
- Hanky Panky (1982) as Cop Passenger
- Shocktrauma (1982) as Gene Kowalski
- Three's Company (1983) as Officer
- The Lonely Guy (1984) as 2nd Cop
- City Heat (1984) as Pitt Lookout
- Love on the Run (1985) as Lieutenant Sturges
- Fletch (1985) as Willy
- Hollywood Vice Squad (1986) as Farber
- The Check Is in the Mail... (1986) as Rocco
- Jo Jo Dancer, Your Life Is Calling (1986) as Vito
- Summer School (1987) as Mr. Gremp
- Halloween 4: The Return of Michael Myers (1988) as Sheriff Ben Meeker
- Night Court (1988) as Sheldon
- Relentless (1989) as Ike Taylor
- Halloween 5: The Revenge of Michael Myers (1989) as Sheriff Ben Meeker
- Born on the Fourth of July (1989) as Man #2 – Arthur's Bar
- Goodfellas (1990) as Henry's Father
- The Perfect Weapon (1991) as Captain Carl Sanders
- Dead Silence (1991) as Detective Barton
- Joshua Tree (1993) as Detective Jack 'Rudy' Rudisill
- The November Men (1993) as Chief Agent Granger
- Bad Blood (1994) as Bo
- Speed (1994) as Police Commissioner
- Due South (1994–1999, TV Series) as Lieutenant Harding Welsh
- Trial by Jury (1994) as Phillie
- Devil in a Blue Dress (1995) as Detective Jack Miller
- Never Talk to Strangers (1995) as Grogan
- Hoodlum (1997) as Jules Salke
- Men (1997) as Tony, Wine Taster
- The Corruptor (1999) as Captain Stan Klein
- Prisoner of Love (1999) as Walt
- Shadow Hours (2000) as Jeremiah Walker
- Mercy (2000) as Lieutenant Fritch
- The Golden Spiders: A Nero Wolfe Mystery (2000) as 'Lips' Egan
- The Cactus Kid (2000) as Police Captain
- The Day Reagan Was Shot (2001) as FBI Special Agent Cage
- A Nero Wolfe Mystery (2001–2002, Before I Die / Disguise for Murder / Door to Death / The Next Witness) as Thomas 'Thumbs' Meeker / Malcolm Vedder / Lieutenant Noonan / Judge Corbett
- Pretend You Don't See Her (2002) as Detective Ed Sloan
- Men with Brooms (2002) as Scott Blendick
- My Name Is Tanino (2002) as Omobono
- Against the Ropes (2004) as Corcoran
- Where the Truth Lies (2005) as Jack Scaglia
- Cinderella Man (2005) as Sam
- It's Me...Gerald (2005, TV Series) as Troy
- Final Days of Planet Earth (2006, mini series) as Oliver
- Code Name: The Cleaner (2007) as Old Timer
