= Myra Meets His Family =

1920 short story by F. Scott Fitzgerald

- Short story by F. Scott Fitzgerald
- Country: United States
- Language: English

Publication
- Published in: The Saturday Evening Post
- Publication date: March 20, 1920

"Myra Meets His Family" is a work of short fiction by F. Scott Fitzgerald first appearing in The Saturday Evening Post on March 20, 1920. The story was collected in The Price Was High: Fifty Uncollected Stories by F. Scott Fitzgerald (1979) by Harcourt, Brace & Company. "Myra Meets His Family" was among the first stories accepted by The Saturday Evening Post for publication. Fitzgerald would sell the bulk of his short fiction to the Post during the next 20 years, until his death in 1940.

"Myra Meets His Family" was acquired by Fox Film studios, and adapted to film as The Husband Hunter (1920) starring Eileen Percy and Emory Johnson.

== Plot ==
"Myra Meets His Family" is presented from third-person omniscient point-of-view, with Myra as the focal character.

The story opens with a profile of a female social type, a young, upper-middle-class girl who socializes at Ivy League universities. Myra Harper briefly attends Smith College for a semester, enjoys romances with a number of young army officers during The Great War, two who die in training or combat. Self-absorbed and dedicated to casually falling in love, she reaches the age of 24 feeling jaded. She has gained the reputation of a flirt and an infamous fortune hunter among some suitors. Her former college roommate, now a wife, urges her to select an eligible man and marry. Myra is confident she can get any male she chooses.

Myra sets her sights on Knowleton Whitney, an attractive boy whose family is wealthy; he quickly succumbs to her charms and falls in love. A diamond solitaire establishes their engagement and Myra is invited to appear at the Whitney estate to meet his family. Unbeknownst to Myra, Knowleton's parents—his mother in particular—are determined to see their male heir and only child marry into British royalty and perhaps procure a noble title for the family. Informed that they have already arranged his marriage, the young swain is too diffident to resist the family matriarch. Knowleton is simultaneously informed by an acquaintance that Myra is a notorious gold-digger.

Too diffident to break off the engagement forthrightly, he seeks a means of maneuvering Myra into breaking off the engagement herself. He enlists the support of two unscrupulous men: a well-known actor, Warren Appleton, and a side-show performer named Kelly. For a price, an elaborate scheme is hatched. They rent a manor house, hire theatrical performers to appear as chauffeurs, butlers and maids and well-dressed dinner guests, creating a phony version of the Whitney estate. Appleton presents himself to Myra as Knowleton's father: he is clearly a lunatic. Kelly, cross-dressing as the mother, is no less bizarre: her boudoir is filled with two dozen barking poodles. Knowleton fully participates in the subterfuge.

Myra is dismayed by the odd behavior of the denizens of the strange household. She maintains her composure despite a number of humiliations. Finally, she is ushered into the Whitney portrait gallery, where she views a picture of Knowleton's grandmother: she is Chinese. With this, Myra determines to flee the next morning.

That night, Myra overhears Knowleton, Appleton and Kelly discussing the operation: Knowlton is clearly distressed at the effect the fraud is having on Myra, but his cohorts assure him he is saving his family from disgrace. Myra encounters Knowleton in the garden early next morning: he is a pathetic wreck. Confessing every false detail, he pleads for her forgiveness and pledges his devotion to her. Myra considers, then proposes that they marry immediately, and arrangements are made. Knowleton is ecstatic. She quickly arranges a simple ceremony at the residence of Presbyterian minister, Reverend Walter Gregory, her cousin, and they quickly board a train for the Whitney estate in Chicago.

Just before departure, she tells Knowleton that she has left her traveling bag with "Cousin Walter" and must make a phone call to have it sent forward. Moments later she rendezvous with the "Reverend" Walter: the marriage was a hoax, entirely unbinding, arranged by Myra as sweet revenge against Knowleton. She absconds triumphantly with her wedding ring as a souvenir, determined never to see him again.

== Critical analysis ==
Though Fitzgerald had doubts as to its literary value, his agent Harold Ober quickly procured $400 for the piece from The Saturday Evening Post. According to biographer Matthew J. Bruccoli, Fitzgerald may have compared "Myra Meets His Family" unfavorably to his story "The Ice Palace", considered one of his finest works of short fiction. The stories were written during the same month. Bruccoli adds that: "Myra is a readily recognizable Fitzgerald heroine who appears under a dozen other names in later stories."

== Sources ==
- Fitzgerald, F. Scott (1979). Bruccoli, Matthew J. (ed.). The Price Was High: The Last Uncollected Stories of F. Scott Fitzgerald. New York: Harcourt Brace Jovanovich. ISBN 0-15-174020-8 – via Internet Archive.
- Kuehl, John (1991). Weaver, Gordon (ed.). F. Scott Fitzgerald: A Study of the Short Fiction. Twayne's Studies in Short Fiction. Boston, Massachusetts: Twayne Publishers. ISBN 0-8057-8332-6 – via Internet Archive.
