= Zack Norman =

American film producer (1940–2024)

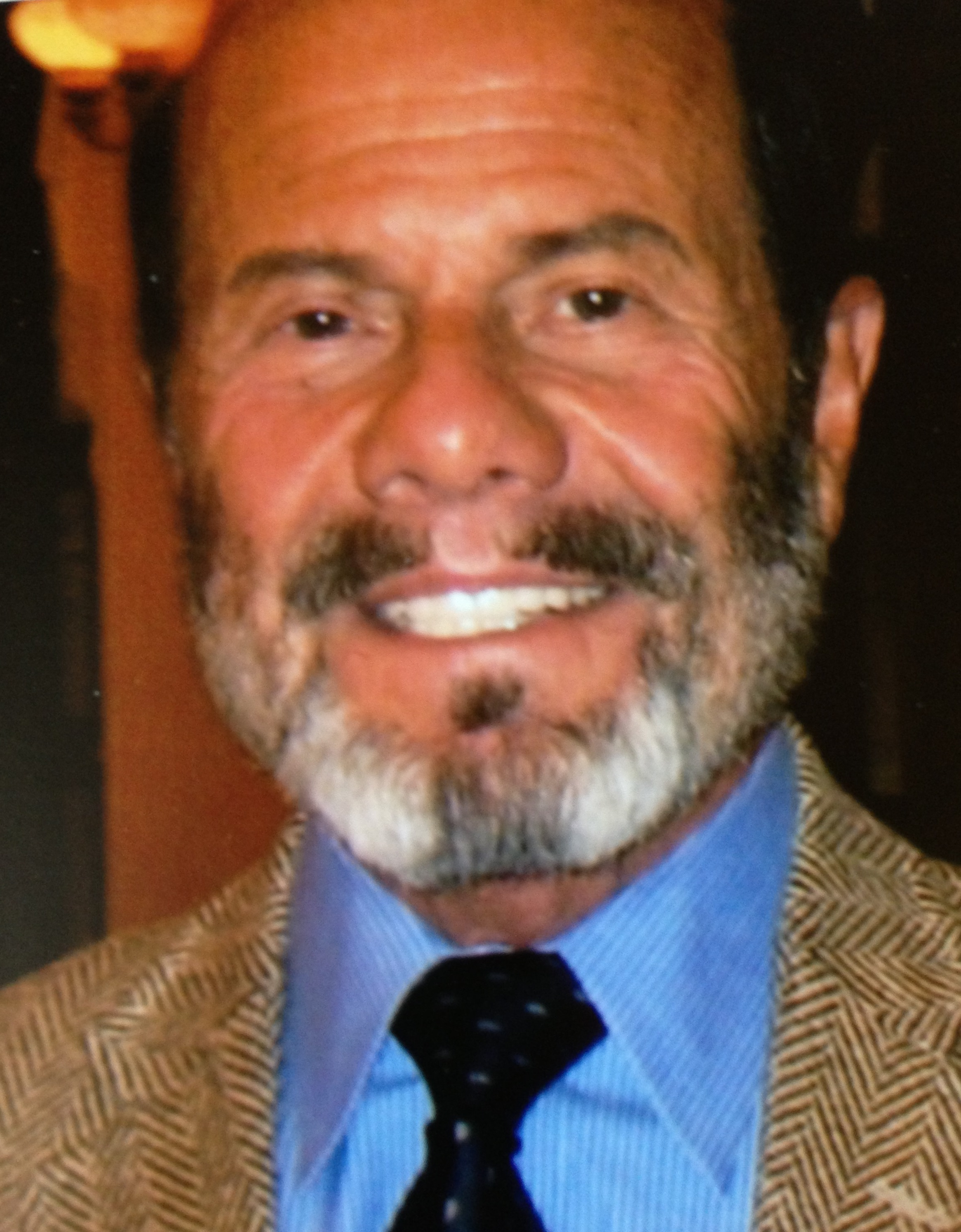
- Norman at the 2012 Palm Beach International Film Festival
- Born: Howard Jerrold Zuker; May 27, 1940; Boston, Massachusetts, U.S.
- Died: April 28, 2024 (aged 83); Burbank, California, U.S.
- Education: Vanderbilt University; Harvard Business School
- Occupations: Actor; comedian; film producer; art collector

Howard Jerrold Zuker (May 27, 1940 – April 28, 2024), known professionally as Zack Norman, was an American actor, comedian, film producer, and art collector. He was best known for his acting role as the cousin of Danny DeVito's character in 20th Century Fox's Romancing the Stone (1984).

As an art collector, Norman sold a Jean-Michel Basquiat piece for a then record-breaking $110.5 million in 2017.

== Legit theatre and stand-up comedy ==
Born in Boston on May 27, 1940, and raised in nearby Revere, by the age of 25 Norman was on the board of directors of a Massachusetts bank.

Norman began performing as a stand-up comedian in strip joints and nightclubs while producing his first Off-Broadway play, the New York premiere of John Arden's Live Like Pigs, which opened on June 7, 1965. In 1966, he left for Europe to work the U.S. Army base circuit operating out of Frankfurt, Germany, playing army clubs throughout Western Europe. On June 7, 1967, Norman opened at the Playboy Club in London, England, where Variety wrote he was "hysterical... one of the funniest guys ever to cross these shores". Soon he was appearing in every Playboy Club on their 18-venue circuit, as well as appearing in hotels and nightclubs such as The Flamingo in Las Vegas and New York's Copacabana with the Temptations. Norman made his television debut on The Tonight Show Starring Johnny Carson on April 28, 1969. As a stage actor, he starred in more than 20 plays. His performance in the title role of Bertolt Brecht's The Resistible Rise of Arturo Ui at the Stamford Center for the Arts in Connecticut (1980) was locally acclaimed.

== Motion pictures ==
In May 1969, Norman traveled to the Cannes International Film Festival in France to put deals together for movie projects. As Howard Zuker, he had developed a film fund financed by a group of Boston real estate investors based on tax ramifications related to the real estate business, i.e. amortization and depreciation, which could be translated into tax incentives for motion picture investment. Norman applied these to his fund, formed Gemini Pictures International, with himself as president. The company's first release was the Italian-made Which Way Do You Dig? (also known as Dark of the Day; And the Bombs Keep Falling, and I Cannoni Tuonano Ancora), in which he also co-starred alongside spaghetti western actor Robert Woods. Over the course of his career, Norman would go on to act in and produce scores of movies, raising in excess of $100,000,000 for motion picture production, most notably with French producer Henry Lange, with whom he made over a dozen films— including the 1971 vampire lesbian cult hit, Daughters of Darkness—and with Bert Schneider: Hearts And Minds (Warner Bros., 1974), The Gentleman Tramp (1976), and Paramount's 1977 Tracks, directed by Henry Jaglom who would become Norman's most frequent moviemaking partner. As producer and actor, Norman collaborated with Jaglom on Sitting Ducks (1980), Venice, Venice (1992), Babyfever (1994), Hollywood Dreams (2005), Irene in Time (2009), Queen of the Lot (2010), and Festival in Cannes (2001), for which Norman received favorable reviews.

In 1998, Norman acquired the catalog of the American Play Company (founded 1889) for himself and actor-producer Michael Douglas for their newly formed joint venture, the American Entertainment Holding Company (AEHC), which controlled the rights to thousands of plays and manuscripts by such authors as John Steinbeck, Tennessee Williams, George Bernard Shaw, Eugene O'Neill, Thornton Wilder, Oscar Wilde, A.A. Milne, and Maurine Dallas Watkins. In 2008, Norman initiated a lawsuit against Douglas; the two settled out of court, dissolving the partnership.

In 2006, Variety's Elizabeth Guider wrote of Norman: "There are people through the decades who become regular fixtures in the pages of Variety—everyone from Al Jolson to Jimmy Durante to Michael Ovitz to Harvey Weinstein. But no one's presence has been as constant as that of Zack Norman." The reason for this, she wrote, is that in the 1980s he regularly bought ads promoting himself on page 6 of the newspaper.

He appeared in Ragtime (1981) and Cadillac Man (1990). He was also seen as Kaz Naiman in Paramount Classics' Festival in Cannes (2001).

In 1986, Norman co-wrote and co-produced Chief Zabu which was also his directing debut. He appears in the film as a real estate mogul. The film was not completed for release until 30 years later. It was panned by critics who found it "uneven" and "ineptly produced".

Norman's E.N.T.E.R. won Best Comedy in October 2018 at the first Cutting Room International Short Film Festival in NYC. As a painter, he is known as Zack Zuker, having done his first painting in New York City in 1976. He made his television debut in 1953 at the age of twelve on WBZ-TV Boston's Community Auditions talent show as a drummer with his band, Howie Zuker and His Music Makers. Subsequently he guest-starred in such popular series as The A-Team (1985) and Baywatch (1993), had a recurring role on The Nanny (1993–1995) and was featured in several TV movies including At Home with the Webbers (1993). As Howard Zuker, he produced more than forty motion pictures, including Hearts and Minds (1974), which won the Academy Award for Best Documentary Feature.

== Fine art collector ==
Norman was an art collector, counting among his acquisitions five pieces by Jean-Michel Basquiat, whose “Untitled” sold in May 2017 at Sotheby's New York for $110.5 million, setting the then record price for an American artist at auction. In 1982, Norman purchased “Hannibal” from Basquiat in the artist's studio for $3200. That piece sold on October 9, 2016, at Sotheby's London for £10.6 million.

== Death ==
Norman died from bilateral pneumonia related to COVID-19 on April 28, 2024, in Burbank, California, at the age of 83.

== Filmography ==
=== Film acting ===
- E.N.T.E.R. (2018)
- Chief Zabu (2016)
- Director’s Commentary: Terror of Frankenstein (2016)
- Ovation (2016)
- The M Word (2013)
- Queen of the Lot (2010)
- Irene in Time (2009)
- Emma Blue (2008)
- Hollywood Dreams (2006)
- Festival in Cannes (2001)
- Has Been (1998)
- Get a Job (1998)
- Crosscut (1996)
- Mojave Moon (1996)
- Babyfever (1994)
- Lucky Ducks (1993)
- Venice, Venice (1992)
- Cadillac Man (1990)
- America
- Romancing The Stone (1984)
- Ragtime (1981)
- Sitting Ducks (1980)
- Fingers (1978)
- Tracks (1977)
- Gums (1976) (non-Sex role as reporter 'Norm Ginggold').
- The Hunted (1972)
- Been Down So Long It Looks Like Up to Me (1971)
- Which Way Do You Dig? (1969)
- Love with the Proper Stranger (1963)

=== Television acting ===
- The A-Team (Double episode, 1985)
- Az aranyifjú [The Golden Boy] (1986, Hungarian TV movie)
- The Flash (1 episode, 1991)
- At Home with the Webbers (1993)
- Baywatch (1 episode, 1993)
- Lush Life (1993)
- Az áldozat [The Victim] (Hungarian TV documentary, 1994)
- The Nanny (3 episodes, 1993–1995)
