= Jon Carnoy =

American writer and director

Jonathan Jerzy Carnoy is an American writer and director. He directed the 1998 romantic comedy Mob Queen.

== Filmography ==
=== Features ===
- 2014 : The Signal Hill Speed Run documentary narrated by Ben Harper.
- 2005 : Pee Stains and Other Disasters starring Michael Soll, Steele Justiss, P.J. Soles and Jason Acuña.
- 1998 : Mob Queen starring David Proval, Dan Moran, Candis Cayne and Tony Sirico.

=== Short films ===
- 2003 : Ben Et Thomas starring Romain Vissol and Adrien Saint-Joré.
- 2001 : The Barber (Le Barbier) starring Ticky Holgado and François Levantal.
- 1999 : The New Unfortunate Adventures Of Alfred The Toad (Les Nouvelles mésaventures d'Alfred le crapaud), a series of 5 shorts.
- 1997 : Lucas starring Julián Gutiérrez.
- 1996 : The Unfortunate Adventures Of Alfred The Toad (Les Mésaventures d'Alfred le crapaud), a series of 5 shorts.
- 1994 : Poisoned Ink starring Jon Carnoy.
- 1993 : The Meal (Le Repas).
- 1992 : Dinner With Malibu starring Brad Merenstein.

=== Television ===
- 2014 : Dreams : 1 Rêve 2 Vies for NRJ 12 on January 6 starring Alice Raucoules and Damien Lauretta.
- 2008 : Ben Et Thomas for France 4 in May starring Antony Marocco and Amezienne Rehaz.
- 2007 : Sous le soleil (3 episodes: 19, 20, 21 from season 12) for TF1
- 2003 : The Real World: Paris for MTV
