= Going Shopping =

- Directed by: Henry Jaglom
- Written by: Victoria Foyt; Henry Jaglom
- Produced by: Judith Wolinsky
- Starring: Victoria Foyt; Rob Morrow; Lee Grant
- Cinematography: Hanania Baer
- Music by: Hariet Schock
- Distributed by: Rainbow Film Company
- Release date: September 30, 2005
- Running time: 106 minutes
- Country: United States
- Language: English

Going Shopping is a 2005 American romance film directed by Henry Jaglom and stars Victoria Foyt, Rob Morrow, Lee Grant, Mae Whitman, Juliet Landau and Summer Caffrey.

== Cast ==
- Victoria Foyt as Holly Gilmore
- Rob Morrow as Miles
- Lee Grant as Winnie
- Juliet Landau as Isabella
- Mae Whitman as Coco
- Bruce Davison as Adam
- Jennifer Grant as Quinn
- Cynthia Sikes as Lisa
- Martha Gehman as Melanie
- Pamela Bellwood as Landlady
- Robert Romanus as Jimmy
- Hilary Shepard as Shopper

== See also ==
- List of films set around Mother's Day
