= Can She Bake a Cherry Pie? =

1983 film

- Film poster
- Directed by: Henry Jaglom
- Written by: Henry Jaglom
- Produced by: M. H. Simonson
- Starring: Michael Emil; Karen Black
- Cinematography: Bob Fiore
- Edited by: Pamela Guest; Francesca Rivieri
- Music by: Karen Black
- Distributed by: Frank Moreno Company
- Release date: May 1983
- Running time: 90 minutes
- Country: United States
- Language: English

Can She Bake a Cherry Pie? is a 1983 American comedy film directed by Henry Jaglom. It was screened in the Un Certain Regard section at the 1983 Cannes Film Festival. The film takes place in and was filmed in the New York City borough of Manhattan. It was released to mixed reviews.

== Plot ==
Zee, a middle-aged musician who was abandoned by her husband, goes to a cafe in Manhattan where she orders the entire dessert section while crying. Eli, a middle-aged divorced social worker, notices and comes over to start a conversation to cheer her up. The two of them later start a relationship, but that relationship has problems that include jealousy, mistrust, and the fear of marriage. Things improve and they became a happy couple, despite peculiarities such as Eli using a meter to measure his heart rate during sex and hanging upside down in the closet. The main supporting character is Larry, who tries to seduce Zee.

== Cast ==
- Karen Black as Zee
- Michael Emil as Eli
- Michael Margotta as Larry
- Frances Fisher as Louise
- Orson Welles as Magician
- Martin Harvey Friedberg as Mort
- Larry David as Friend
- Richard Cox as Customer
- Carol Kane as Customer
- Arnon Milchan as Customer

== Production ==
Can She Bake a Cherry Pie? was filmed on the Upper West Side of Manhattan, at locations within a 10-block radius of the American Museum of Natural History. Some of the places in the area do not exist anymore. The filmmakers relied on the regular pedestrian traffic to background the scenes, rather than hiring extras.

Karen Black, who stars as Zee, composed the music for the film. Cameos include Orson Welles as a magician and Larry David as Eli's friend.

The title of the movie comes from the lyric in the folk song "Billy Boy".

== Release ==
The film was originally released at the 1983 Cannes Film Festival in the Un Certain Regard section. It later opened at only one New York theatre, the 68th Street Playhouse. It was released on VHS by itself and was released on DVD as a part of Henry Jaglom Collection vol. 2: The Comedies, along with Sitting Ducks and New Years Day. The film was presented in widescreen and the only special features for the film were trailers.

== Reception ==
Critical reaction was mixed. Film critic David Thomson wrote:

Cherry Pie is an actors' film in that it grows out of their personalities. It is as loose and unexpected as life, but as shaped and witty as a great short story. In truth, a new kind of film, about love, talk, happiness and failure, about acting and speaking, about New York and Karen Black, and about the way in which a germ of a situation and good players can build an absorbing, vital picture ... 'Cherry Pie' is a unique, memorable and daring film and could be the surprise hit of the year. It shows us that there is still a chance for confident, inspired charm in movies.

A Sun-Sentinel reviewer called the film "endearing". A review in the book TLA Film, Video, and DVD Guide 2002-2003 said: "Pure emotion meets pure logic and the result is an oddly charming couple". On the other hand, People called the plot "aimless" and incoherent. A TV Guide review said: "Decent performances are not enough to save this movie, in which some scenes stretch on much longer than they should, making the genuinely funny moments few and far between".

The film received two and a half stars in the book Off-Hollywood Movies. It is considered one of Jaglom's more successful films.
