= Foyt =

Foyt is a surname. Notable people with the surname include:

- An American sporting family with interests in auto racing and American football:
  - A. J. Foyt (born 1935), former racing driver and team owner
  - Larry Foyt (born 1977), son of A. J.; semi-retired NASCAR and IndyCar driver
  - Casey Foyt (née Irsay; born 1983), businesswoman and American football executive
  - A. J. Foyt IV (born 1984), grandson of A. J. and husband of Casey; former race car driver and current American football scout
- Victoria Foyt, American author, novelist, screenwriter and actress

== See also ==
- A. J. Foyt Enterprises, American racing team in the IndyCar Series and formerly NASCAR
- 2007 ABC Supply Company A.J. Foyt 225, race in the 2007 IRL IndyCar Series, held at The Milwaukee Mile
- 2008 ABC Supply Company A.J. Foyt 225, race in the 2008 IRL IndyCar Series, held at The Milwaukee Mile
- 2009 ABC Supply Company A.J. Foyt 225, race in the 2009 IndyCar Series, held at the Milwaukee Mile
- A. J. Foyt 225 or Milwaukee IndyFest, IndyCar Series race held at the Milwaukee Mile in West Allis, Wisconsin
