= The M Word =

- Directed by: Henry Jaglom
- Written by: Ron Vignone; Henry Jaglom
- Produced by: Rosemary Marks
- Starring: Tanna Frederick; Michael Imperioli; Corey Feldman; Frances Fisher; Gregory Harrison; Mary Crosby
- Cinematography: Hanania Baer
- Edited by: Ron Vignone; Henry Jaglom
- Distributed by: Rainbow Film Company
- Release date: April 30, 2014
- Running time: 116 minutes 120 minutes
- Country: United States
- Language: English
- Budget: $100,000
- Box office: $80,000

The M Word is a 2014 American comedy-drama film directed by Henry Jaglom and starring Tanna Frederick, Michael Imperioli, Corey Feldman, Frances Fisher, Gregory Harrison and Mary Crosby.

== Plot ==
Employees attempt to save their struggling television station by producing a documentary about menopause.

== Cast ==
- Tanna Frederick
- Michael Imperioli
- Corey Feldman
- Frances Fisher
- Gregory Harrison
- Mary Crosby
- Eliza Roberts
- Stephen Howard
- Robert Hallak
- Zack Norman
- Sharon Angela
- Ron Vignone
- Cathy Arden
- Michael Emil
- Simon O. Jaglom
- David Frederick
- Jane Van Voorhis
- David Proval
- Julie Davis

== Casting ==
On October 24, 2011, it was announced that Feldman was cast in the film. On November 18, 2011, it was announced that Frederick was cast in the film.

== Release ==
The film was released in theaters in Los Angeles and New York City on April 30, 2014.

== Reception ==
The film has a 44% rating on Rotten Tomatoes. Chuck Bowen of Slant Magazine awarded the film three stars out of four.

Scott Foundas of Variety gave the film a negative review, calling it "lively but wildly erratic".
