= Train to Zakopané =

- Film poster
- Directed by: Henry Jaglom
- Written by: Henry Jaglom
- Based on: Train to Zakopané by Henry Jaglom
- Starring: Mike Falkow; Tanna Frederick
- Cinematography: Christopher C. Pearson
- Release date: April 29, 2017 (Los Angeles Jewish Film Festival)
- Running time: 113 minutes
- Country: United States
- Language: English

Train to Zakopané is a 2017 American drama film written and directed by Henry Jaglom and starring Mike Falkow and Tanna Frederick. It is based on Jaglom's 2014 play of the same name and is his final film.

== Plot ==
A Jewish businessman meets a nurse during a train journey to Warsaw. He begins to develop feelings for her, but faces a life-changing decision after discovering her antisemitic beliefs.

== Cast ==
- Mike Falkow as Semyon
- Tanna Frederick as Katya
- Stephen Howard as Father Alexandrov
- Cathy Arden as Madame Nadia Selmeczy

== Release ==
The film premiered at the Los Angeles Jewish Film Festival on April 29, 2017.

== Reception ==
Michael Rechtshaffen of the Los Angeles Times gave the film a negative review and wrote, "In the absence of any subtlety, Jaglom’s protracted discourse on intolerance and compassion begins losing dramatic steam long before it reaches its intended destination."
