= Marianna Hill =

American actress (born 1942)

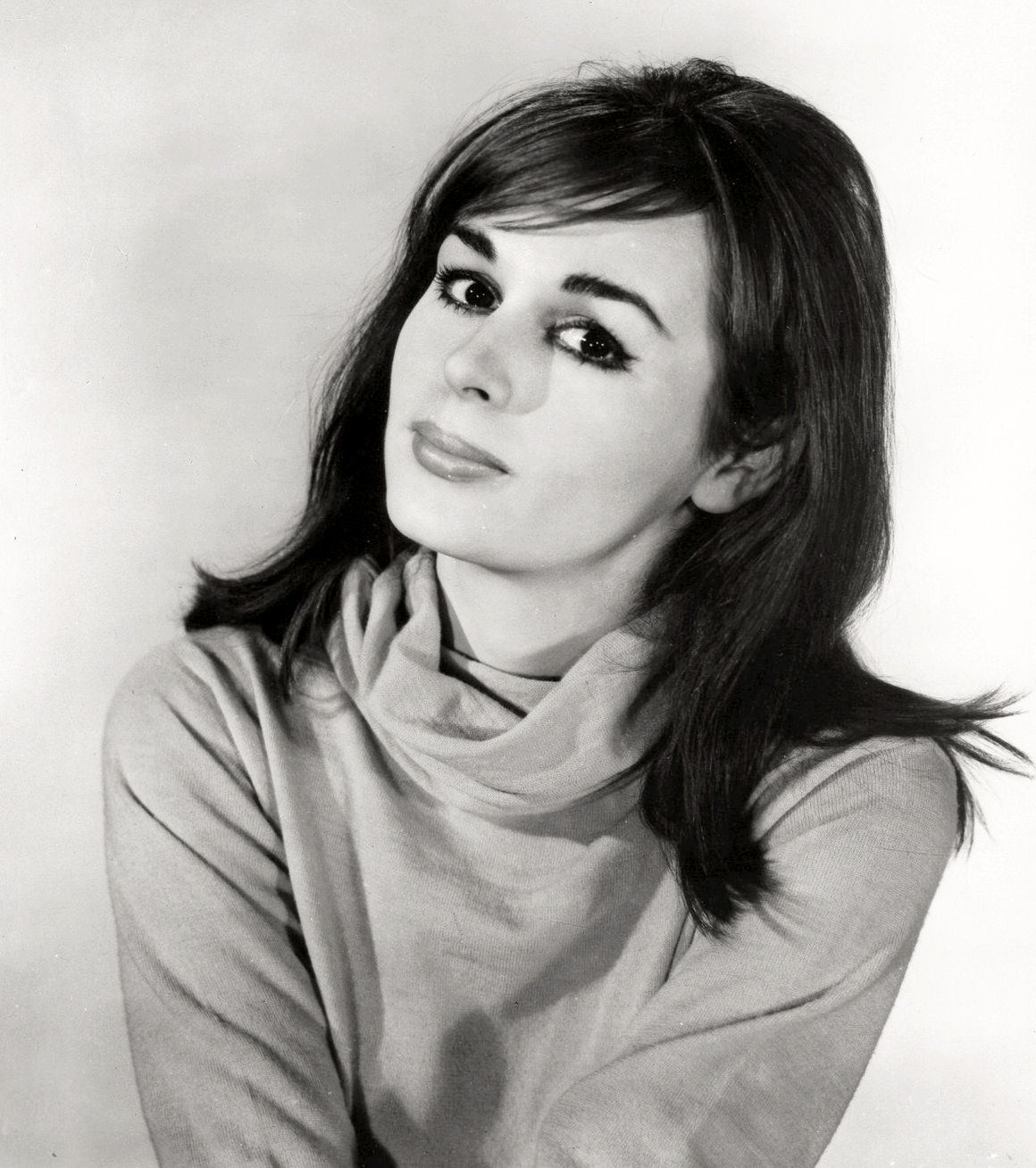
- Hill in Black Zoo, 1963
- Born: Marianna Schwarzkopf; February 9, 1942 (age 84); Santa Bárbara de Nexe, Portugal
- Other name: Mariana Hill
- Occupation: Actress
- Years active: 1960–2016
- Known for: High Plains Drifter; El Condor; Batman; Star Trek: "Dagger of the Mind"; Messiah of Evil; The Godfather Part II
- Children: 2

Marianna Hill (also Mariana Hill, born Marianna Schwarzkopf; February 9, 1942) is an American actress who is known for her starring roles in the Western films El Condor (1970) and High Plains Drifter and the cult horror film Messiah of Evil (both 1973), as well as many appearances on television series in the 1960s and 1970s. She was featured as the wife of Fredo Corleone in The Godfather Part II (1974).

== Early life and education ==
Hill was born Marianna Schwarzkopf in Santa Bárbara de Nexe, Portugal, to architect Frank Schwarzkopf and writer Mary Hawthorne Hill, who worked as a script doctor. United States Army General Norman Schwarzkopf Jr. was her second cousin.

Her father, a building contractor, worked in several countries, which resulted in Hill's birth in Portugal and education in California, Spain, and Canada. During her teenage years, her family settled in southern California when her father purchased a restaurant there.

== Career ==
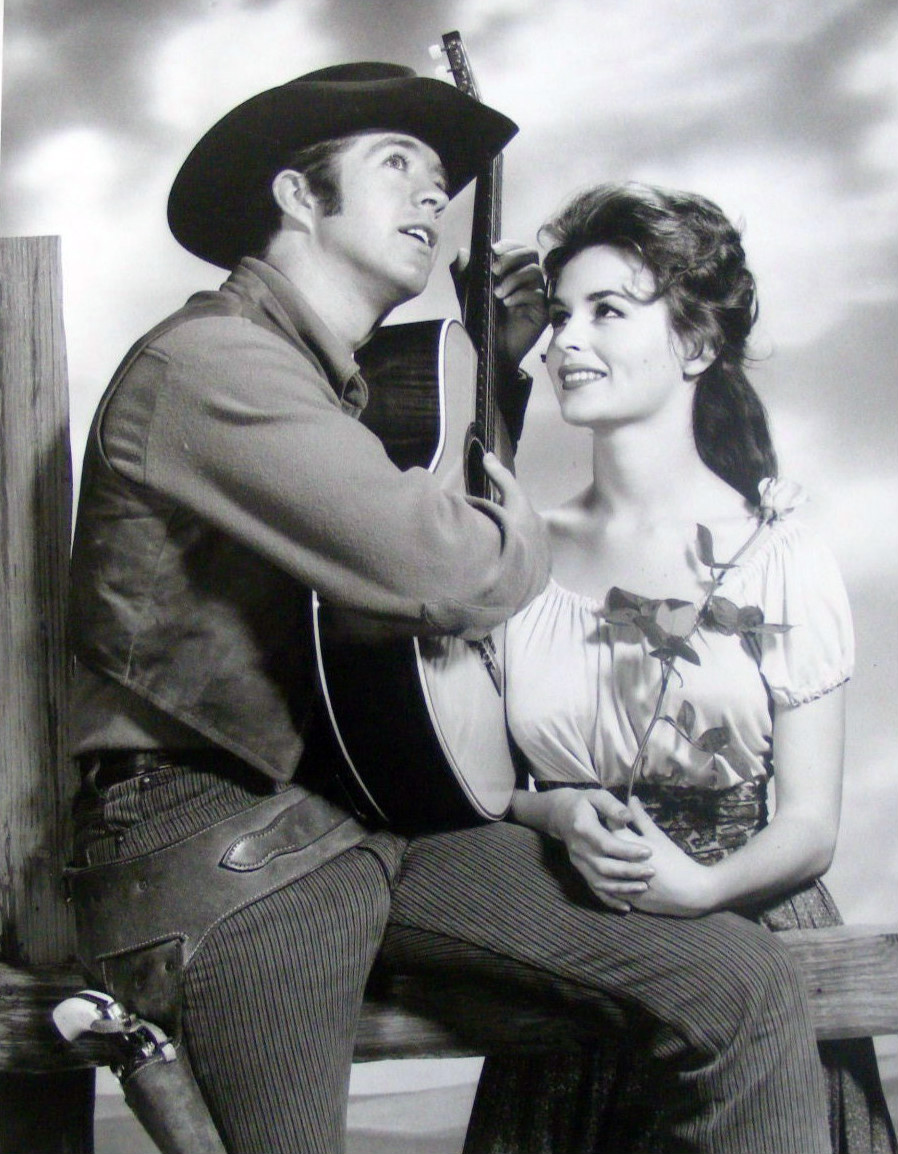
Hill with Clu Gulager as Billy the Kid in The Tall Man

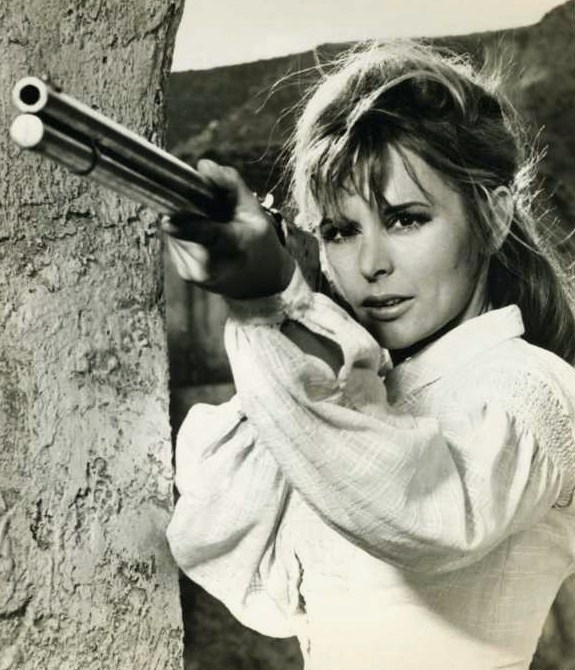
Hill in El Condor

Hill's initial acting experience came when she was an apprentice at the Laguna Playhouse. She then worked three summers at the La Jolla Playhouse, and later gained more experience at the Neighborhood Playhouse School of the Theatre. She was a life member of The Actors Studio as of January 1980. She adopted her mother's surname ("Hill") as her professional surname. She appeared in more than 70 films and television episodes.

Her film debut came in Married Too Young (1962). She played Gabrielle in the Howard Hawks film Red Line 7000 (1965) and featured in the Elvis Presley film Paradise, Hawaiian Style (1966); the Haskell Wexler political film Medium Cool (1969); the western El Condor (1970); the Clint Eastwood film High Plains Drifter (1973) as Callie Travers; the cult classic horror-thriller film The Baby (1973) as Germaine Wadsworth; and in The Godfather Part II (1974) as Deanna Dunn-Corleone, Fredo Corleone's hard-drinking wife.

Beginning in 1970, her billing changed to "Mariana Hill." She stated in a 2016 interview that the spelling change was not her choice, and possibly resulted from "Mariana" being the standard spelling of her name in Spain, where El Condor was filmed. She did not object when the alteration continued in the credits of future projects, notably on the poster for The Godfather Part II.

Hill guest-starred on several television series, including My Three Sons, Hogan's Heroes, Love, American Style, the original Star Trek series ("Dagger of the Mind", 1966, as Dr. Helen Noel), and Perry Mason ("The Case of the Greek Goddess", 1963, as Theba). She also appeared on The High Chaparral; Bonanza; Death Valley Days; Gunsmoke; The Wild Wild West; Dr. Kildare; The F.B.I.; Quincy, M.E.; S.W.A.T.; Kung Fu; The Outer Limits; Mannix; Batman; Daniel Boone; The Tall Man; Mission: Impossible; and the first pilot movie for Harry O. Her last television appearance was in a 1984 episode of Remington Steele.

After moving to New York to teach at the Lee Strasberg Theatre Institute, Hill moved to England in 1988 to teach at the Lee Strasberg Studio in London. She remained there until its closure in 2001. Hill continued to teach at the Method Studio in London, and made an appearance in the 2005 British film Coma Girl: The State of Grace, a part she got through the association of one of her students with the film's writer and director Dina Jacobsen.

Her last American film was Chief Zabu, which was filmed on the campus of Bard College in New York in 1986. The film was not released until 2016. In a rare public appearance, Hill attended the premiere of the movie at the 2016 Fort Lauderdale Film Festival.

Hill lives in the UK. She teaches acting privately and at acting workshops. She was scheduled to make an appearance at the Destination Star Trek Germany convention in June 2021, but the convention was postponed due to the COVID-19 pandemic.

== Filmography ==
=== Film ===
- 1962: Married Too Young as Marla
- 1963: Black Zoo as Audrey
- 1963: Wives and Lovers (uncredited)
- 1964: The New Interns as Sandy
- 1964: Roustabout as Viola (uncredited)
- 1965: That Funny Feeling (1965) Kitty (uncredited)
- 1965: Red Line 7000 as Gabrielle
- 1966: Paradise, Hawaiian Style as Lani Kaimana
- 1969: Medium Cool as Ruth
- 1970: El Condor as Claudine
- 1970: The Traveling Executioner as Gundred Herzallerliebst
- 1972: Thumb Tripping as Lynne
- 1973: The Baby as Germaine Wadsworth
- 1973: High Plains Drifter as Callie Travers
- 1973: Messiah of Evil as Arletty
- 1974: The Last Porno Flick as Mary
- 1974: The Godfather Part II as Deanna Corleone
- 1978: The Astral Factor as Bambi Greer (re-released in 1984 as Invisible Strangler)
- 1980: Schizoid as Julie
- 1980: Blood Beach as Catherine Hutton
- 1988: Chief Zabu as Jennifer Holding
- 2005: Coma Girl: The State of Grace as Mrs. Anderson

=== Television ===
Marianna Hill television credits
Year	Title	Role	Notes
1960–1961	The Tall Man	Rita	5 episodes
1960–1962	77 Sunset Strip	Silvana Mello	4 episodes
1963	Perry Mason	Theba	Episode: "The Case of the Greek Goddess"
1963	Gunsmoke	Annie	Episode: "Pa Hack's Brood" (S9.E13)
1964	Dr. Kildare	Gina Craig	1 episode
1964	Bonanza	Dolores Tenino	Episode: "Ponderosa Matador" (S5.E15)
1964	Death Valley Days	Tula	1 episode
1964	Outer Limits	Nina Link	Episode: "I, Robot" (S2.E9)
1966	Batman	Cleo Patrick / Cleopatra	2 episodes
1966	Star Trek: The Original Series	Dr. Helen Noel	Episode: "Dagger of the Mind" (S1.E9)
1967	My Three Sons	Denise Dubose	1 episode
1967	The Wild Wild West	Belladonna	1 episode
1968	Mission Impossible	Luisa Rojas	Episode: "The Condemned" (S2.E19)
1968–1969	Mannix	Marcie / Ellen Barton	2 episodes
1969	The F.B.I.	Antonia Marin	1 episode
1969	Mayberry RFD	Renee	1 episode
1969	The High Chaparral	Juanita	1 episode
1969	Hogan's Heroes	Eskimo / Lousia	Episode: "The Gasoline War"
1970	Love American Style	Angelica Stone	Segment: "Love and the Gangster"
1970	Daniel Boone	Nancy Hanks	1 episode
1973	Harry O	Mildred	1 episode
1974	Kung Fu	Louise Coblenz	Episode: "The Passion of Chen Yi" (S2.E19)
1976	Death at Love House	Lorna Love	TV movie
1976	S.W.A.T.	Kate Devers	Episode: "Soldier on the Hill" (S2.E23)
1977	Quincy, M.E.	Lisa	1 episode
1984	Remington Steele	Brenda Flowers	1 episode
