= Alan Rachins =

American actor and comedian (1942–2024)

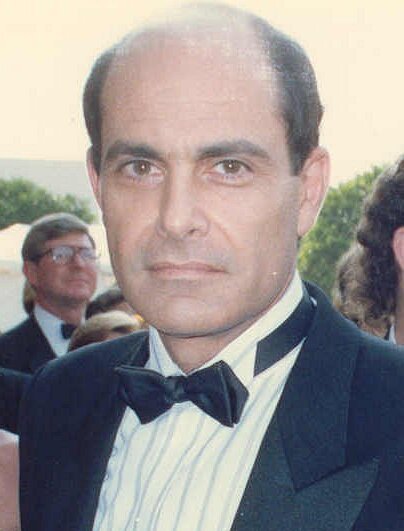
- Rachins at the 1988 Emmy Awards
- Born: October 3, 1942; Cambridge, Massachusetts, U.S.
- Died: November 2, 2024 (aged 82); Los Angeles, California, U.S.
- Occupations: Actor; comedian; writer; director
- Years active: 1967–2023
- Spouse: Joanna Frank (m. 1978)
- Children: 1
- Relatives: Steven Bochco (brother-in-law); Jesse Bochco (nephew)

Alan L. Rachins (Note: Sources differ on whether Rachins's middle name was Leonard or Lewis.) (/reɪtʃɪns/; October 3, 1942 – November 2, 2024) was an American actor and comedian, known for his role as Douglas Brackman in L.A. Law which earned him both Golden Globe and Emmy nominations, and his portrayal of Larry (Dharma's hippie father) on the television series Dharma & Greg.

== Early life ==
Born in Cambridge, Massachusetts, on October 3, 1942, Rachins was the only child of Edward and Ida Rachins of Brookline, Massachusetts. Both his parents were Jewish, and his father worked in a family food manufacturing business, Snow Crest. When Alan was eleven, his mother died, and because his father often lived away from home while working, Alan was often alone. As a teenager, he saw the film Rebel Without a Cause, which motivated him to pursue acting as a way to channel the loneliness and grief he felt over his home life.

After graduating from Brookline High School, planning to enter the family business, Rachins enrolled at Wharton School of Finance and Commerce at the University of Pennsylvania, but he ultimately dropped out and moved to New York to study acting. He later graduated from Empire State College in 1974.

== Career ==
Beginning in 1967, he performed in a succession of plays, including the original Broadway productions of After the Rain and Hadrian the Seventh, as well as the original off-Broadway productions of The Trojan Women and the controversial Oh! Calcutta! In 1972, Rachins put his acting career on hold when he was accepted as a fellow in the writing and directing programs at the American Film Institute. He went on to sell scripts to a variety of shows, including The Fall Guy, Hill Street Blues, Knight Rider, Quincy, and Hart To Hart.

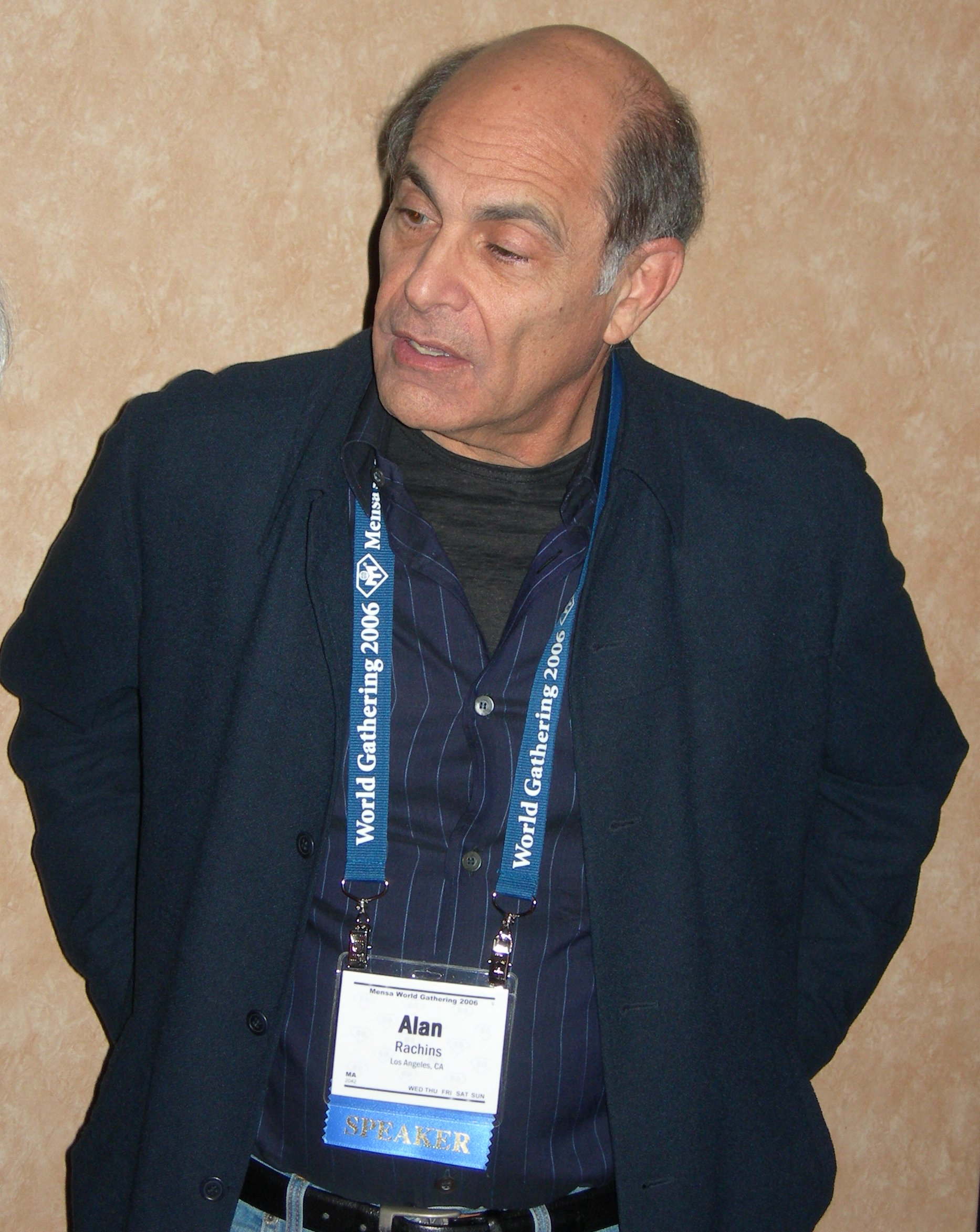
Rachins in 2006

Despite these successes as a writer and director, Rachins returned to his acting career with a leading role in Henry Jaglom's independent film, Always. This critically acclaimed film brought him widespread attention and ultimately led to his role on L.A. Law. He continued working in feature films, and provided the voice for the Clock King in two episodes of Batman: The Animated Series, and later in one episode of Justice League Unlimited.

His later theater appearances included the world premiere of Arthur Laurents' Attacks of the Heart at the George Street Playhouse in New Brunswick, New Jersey. At the Cape Playhouse, he played the part of Matthew Harrison Brady in Inherit The Wind. He took the role of "Albin" in La Cage Aux Folles at the Jupiter Theater, was seen in Love Letters with Swoosie Kurtz at Beverly Hills' Coronet Theatre, and starred in a revival of Promises, Promises with Jason Alexander, Jean Smart, and Alan Thicke at the Freud Theatre in Los Angeles.

Rachins appeared on the ABC television series Eli Stone, playing an attorney in consultation with Stone. For two seasons, he provided the voice of Norman Osborn in the animated series The Spectacular Spider-Man. He also appeared on the TNT television series Rizzoli & Isles as a recurring guest star, and guest starred as Frank (Bob's father, and Gabe, PJ, and Teddy's granddad) in the Good Luck Charlie episode "It's a Charlie Duncan Thanksgiving".

== Personal life and death ==
Rachins and actress Joanna Frank married in 1978 and had a son. The couple formed the production company Allofit Productions which acquired books and original screenplays to develop for television and feature films. Rachins was a member of Mensa International. He supported Michael Dukakis in the 1988 Democratic presidential primaries.

Rachins died from heart failure at the Cedars-Sinai Medical Center in Los Angeles, California on November 2, 2024, 30 days after his 82nd birthday.

== Filmography ==
=== Film ===
Year	Title	Role	Notes
1986	Thunder Run	Carlos	
1990	Heart Condition	Dr. Posner	
1994	North	Defense Attorney	
1995	Showgirls	Tony Moss	
1997	Meet Wally Sparks	Judge Randal Williams	
1997	Leave It to Beaver	Fred Rutherford	
2011	Answers to Nothing	Ryan's Dad	Voice
2013	Scooby-Doo! Mecha Mutt Menace	Dr. Ned Staples	Voice; direct-to-video

=== Television ===
Year	Title	Role	Notes
1986–1994	L.A. Law	Douglas Brackman Jr.	171 episodes
1987	J.J. Starbuck	Pasban Bapu	Episode: "The Circle Broken"
1990	Ferris Bueller	Himself	Episode: "Pilot"
1991	The Golden Girls	Jason Stillman	Episode: "Even Grandmas Get the Blues"
1992–1994	Batman: The Animated Series	Temple Fugate / Clock King	Voice, 2 episodes
1994	Hart to Hart	David Kramer	"Crimes of the Hart"
1996	Lois & Clark: The New Adventures of Superman	Professor Jefferson Cole	2 episodes
1996	Rugrats	Lowell, Greek Bully, Donut Man	Voice, episode: "Chanukah"
1996	Diagnosis: Murder	Dr. Frank Donati	Episode: "Murder Can Be Murder"
1997	Stargate SG-1	Colonel Kennedy	Episode: "The Enemy Within"
1997–2002	Dharma & Greg	Myron Lawrence "Larry" Finkelstein	Main role (117 episodes)
2005	Justice League Unlimited	Temple Fugate / Clock King	Voice, episode: "Task Force X"
2008–2009	The Spectacular Spider-Man	Norman Osborn	Voice, 15 episodes
2011	Good Luck Charlie	Frank Duncan	Episode: "It's a Charlie Duncan Thanksgiving"
2011–2013	Rizzoli & Isles	Stanley	6 episodes
2012	American Dad!	Various	Voice, episode: "Ricky Spanish"
2018	Grey's Anatomy	Patient	Episode: "Blowin' In The Wind"
2021	Young Sheldon	Vern	Episode: "The Geezer Bus and a New Model for Education"
2023	NCIS	Bud	Episode: "Unusual Suspects"
