= Joanna Frank =

American actress

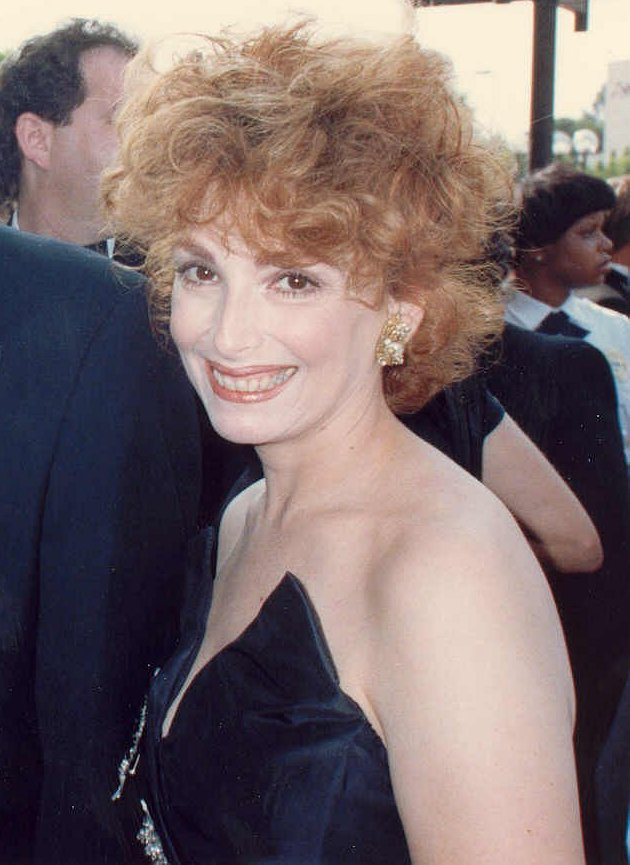
- Frank in 1988
- Born: 1940 or 1941 (age 84–85); United States
- Occupation: Actress
- Years active: 1963–1994
- Spouse: Alan Rachins (m. 1978; died 2024)
- Children: 1
- Relatives: Steven Bochco (brother); Jesse Bochco (nephew)

Joanna Frank (born 1940 or 1941) is an American actress.

== Career ==
Her first role was in Elia Kazan's 1963 film America, America as the character "Vartuhi", and she also appeared in The Young Animals (1968) and the cult biker film The Savage Seven (1968). Her later film credits included roles in Henry Jaglom's Always (1985) and the romantic comedy Say Anything... (1989).

On television her first roles were as the malevolent "Regina" in The Outer Limits episode "ZZZZZ" (Season 1, Episode 18), which aired January 27, 1964. The following day, January 28, 1964, the episode "Where the Action Is" in The Fugitive in which she appeared as "Chris Polichek", aired (Season 1, Episode 18). Years later, she appeared on L.A. Law, which was starring her husband, Alan Rachins and co-created by her brother, Emmy Award winning television director, writer and producer Steven Bochco.

== Personal life ==
She is the elder sister of Steven Bochco, the producer of Hill Street Blues and NYPD Blue. Her husband was actor Alan Rachins of Dharma and Greg and L. A. Law. The couple had one child.

== Filmography ==
=== Film ===
Year	Title	Role	Notes
1963	America America	Vartuhi	
1968	The Savage Seven	Marcia Little Hawk	
1968	The Young Animals	Raquel	
1982	Double Exposure	The Bartender's Ex-Wife	
1985	Always	Lucy	
1989	Say Anything...	Mrs. Kerwin	

=== Television ===
Year	Title	Role	Notes
1963	Breaking Point	Alice Meade	Episode: "Whatsoever Things I Hear"
1964	The Outer Limits	Regina	Episode: "ZZZZZ"
1964	The Fugitive	Chris Polichek	Episode: "Where the Action Is"
1965	Ben Casey	Carla Lanz	Episode: "A Dipperful of Water from a Poisoned Well"
1972	Probe	Stewardess	Television film
1973	Griff	Rebecca Wilde	Episode: "The Last Ballad"
1978	Police Woman	Vivian	Episode: "Sunset"
1978	Richie Brockelman, Private Eye	Mrs. Logan	Episode: "Escape from Caine Abel"
1986–1994	L.A. Law	Sheila Brackman	19 episodes
1991	L.A. Law 100th Episode Celebration	Sheila Brackman	Television film
