= Festival in Cannes =

2001 film by Henry Jaglom

- Directed by: Henry Jaglom
- Written by: Victoria Foyt; Henry Jaglom
- Produced by: John Goldstone
- Starring: Anouk Aimée; Greta Scacchi; Maximilian Schell; Zack Norman
- Music by: Gaili Schoen
- Distributed by: Paramount Classics
- Release date: November 3, 2001
- Running time: 100 min.
- Country: United States
- Language: English

Festival in Cannes is a 2001 film directed by Henry Jaglom.

The plot is an entertainment industry farce about filmmakers trying to make deals during the 1999 Cannes Film Festival.

== Plot summary ==
Cannes, 1999. Alice, an actress, wants to direct an indie picture. Kaz, a talkative (and maybe bogus) deal maker, promises $3 million if she'll use Millie, an aging French star. But, Rick, a big producer, needs Millie for a small part in a fall movie or he loses his star, Tom Hanks. Is Kaz for real? Can Rick sweet-talk Alice and sabotage Kaz to keep Millie from taking that deal? Millie consults with Victor, her ex, about which picture to make, Rick needs money, an ingenue named Blue is discovered, Kaz hits on Victor's new love, and Rick's factotum connects with Blue. Knives go in various backs. Wheels spin. Which deals - and pairings - will be consummated?

In Cannes, actress Alice Palmer wants to have her debut in the cinema industry as director and her two friends have written a screenplay for Gena Rowlands. However they are approached by the counterfeit crasher Kaz Naiman who convinces them to rewrite the scrip for the famous French actress Millie Marquand currently at the festival. In return he will sponsor the feature with three million dollars. Millie loves the screenplay and promises to make the film. However, the powerful producer Rick Yorkin is producing a blockbuster with Tom Hanks and Simone Duvall and needs Millie Marquand to perform the role of Tom Hanks' mother. Millie's former husband, the director Viktor Kovner is in Cannes and Rick manipulates him to convince Millie to accept the part. Meanwhile, the promising debutant star Blue becomes a hit in the festival but is divided between her lover and her career.

== Cast ==
- Anouk Aimée as Millie Marquand
- Greta Scacchi as Alice Palmer
- Maximilian Schell as Viktor Kovner
- Ron Silver as Rick Yorkin
- Jenny Gabrielle as Blue
- Zack Norman as Kaz Naiman
- Peter Bogdanovich as Milo

Cameos:

- Faye Dunaway
- Jeff Goldblum
- Holly Hunter
- William Shatner
