= Gaili Schoen =

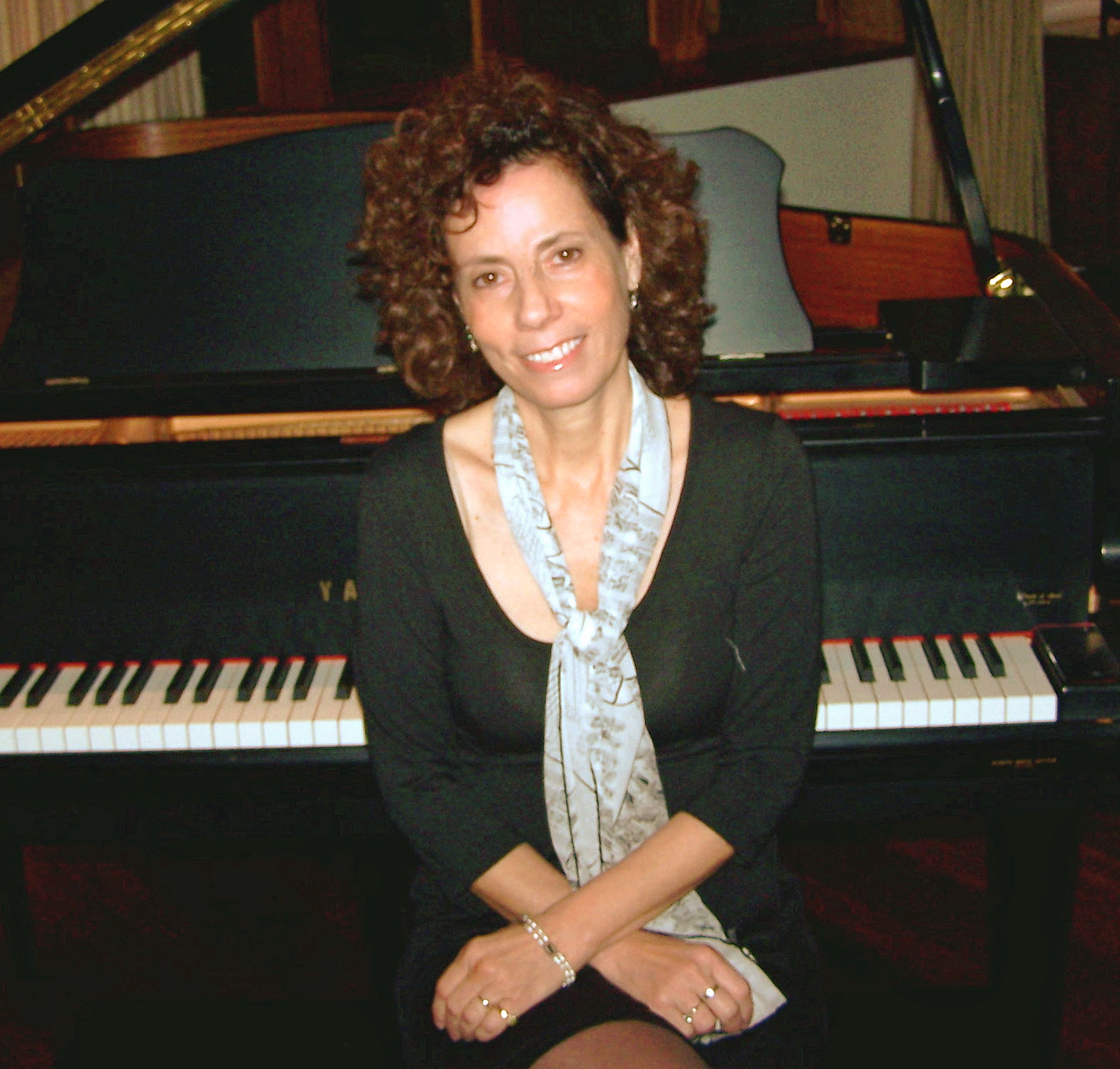
- Gaili Schoen in 2012
- Born: Susan Gaili Schoen; Venice, California, U.S.
- Occupations: Film composer, orchestrator, pianist, author
- Known for: Festival in Cannes, Déjà Vu, Upper Hands Piano
- Website: Upper Hands Piano website

Gaili Schoen (born Susan Gaili Schoen, in Venice, California) is an American film composer, orchestrator, and pianist. She is best known for her scores for the films Festival in Cannes starring Maximilian Schell, Anouk Aimée, Ron Silver, and Greta Scacchi, and Déjà Vu, starring Stephen Dillane and Vanessa Redgrave, both directed by Henry Jaglom. Her television work includes the score for the 2007 PBS documentary Annie Leibovitz: A Life Through A Lens which she composed with score producer James Newton Howard. Schoen composed a 52-piece orchestral score for the 2008 feature film Noble Things starring Michael Parks, Ryan Hurst, and country singer Lee Ann Womack, and scored the 2011 documentary The Ghost of War, about the RMS Queen Mary.

In 2012-2015 Schoen published a piano method book series called Upper Hands Piano: A Method for Adults 50+ to Spark the Mind, Heart and Soul. The books teach the art of playing the piano, while enhancing brain functioning.
