= Just 45 Minutes from Broadway =

- Directed by: Henry Jaglom
- Screenplay by: Henry Jaglom
- Based on: Just 45 Minutes from Broadway by Henry Jaglom
- Produced by: Rosemary Marks
- Starring: Tanna Frederick; Judd Nelson
- Cinematography: Hanania Baer
- Edited by: Ron Vignone
- Release date: October 3, 2012 (Los Angeles)
- Running time: 105 minutes 108 minutes 116 minutes
- Country: United States
- Language: English

Just 45 Minutes from Broadway is a 2012 American drama film written and directed by Henry Jaglom and starring Tanna Frederick and Judd Nelson. It is based on Jaglom's 2009 play of the same name.

== Plot ==
Grisha, the patriarch of a family and former star of Yiddish theatre, says he's writing a book for the public when one daughter, the only one to reject a life in show business, brings home her fiancé after a year of estrangement.

== Cast ==
- Tanna Frederick
- Judd Nelson
- Diane Salinger
- Jack Heller
- David Proval
- Julie Davis
- Harriet Schock
- Michael Emil
- Mary Crosby
- Sabrina Jaglom
- P.T. Townsend
- Eliza Simon
- Jack Quaid
- Linda Carson
- Emily Alexander

== Release ==
The film was released at Laemmle Theatres in Los Angeles and Southern California on October 3, 2012. It was later released in theaters in New York City on October 17, 2012.

== Reception ==
The film has an 18% rating on Rotten Tomatoes. Calum Marsh of Slant Magazine awarded the film half a star out of four.
