= El Condor (film) =

1970 film

- Theatrical release poster
- Directed by: John Guillermin
- Screenplay by: Larry Cohen; Steven Carabatsos
- Story by: Steven Carabatsos
- Produced by: Andre de Toth
- Starring: Jim Brown; Lee Van Cleef; Marianna Hill; Patrick O'Neal
- Cinematography: Henri Persin
- Edited by: Walter Hannemann; William H. Ziegler
- Music by: Maurice Jarre
- Production company: Carthay Continental
- Distributed by: National General Pictures
- Release date: September 23, 1970
- Running time: 102 minutes
- Country: United States
- Language: English

El Condor is a 1970 American Western film directed by John Guillermin. Luke (Jim Brown) and Jaroo (Lee Van Cleef) lead a band of Apaches (including Iron Eyes Cody) against a fortress commanded by Chavez (Patrick O'Neal). The fortress is said to contain the gold reserves of Emperor Maximilian.

The movie was shot in 35mm Technicolor in Almería, Spain, and involved the construction of the huge adobe fortress set that was re-used in later films, including Conan the Barbarian (1982) and March or Die (1977). El Condor was among the first movies rated R (for violence, explicit language, and nudity).

== Plot ==
In 1860s Mexico, Luke, an escaped convict, and Jaroo, a gold prospecting hermit (who bounty hunts would-be claim jumpers on the side), team up with a band of Apache Indians to capture a heavily armed fortress for the thousands of gold bars said to be stored within. The fortress is commanded by the sadistic Chavez, whose mistress, Claudine, Luke becomes attracted to the moment he sees her.

== Cast ==
Actor	Role
Jim Brown	Luke
Lee Van Cleef	Jaroo
Patrick O'Neal	Chavez
Marianna Hill	Claudine
Iron Eyes Cody	Santana
Imogen Hassall	Dolores
Elisha Cook Jr.	Old Convict

== Production ==
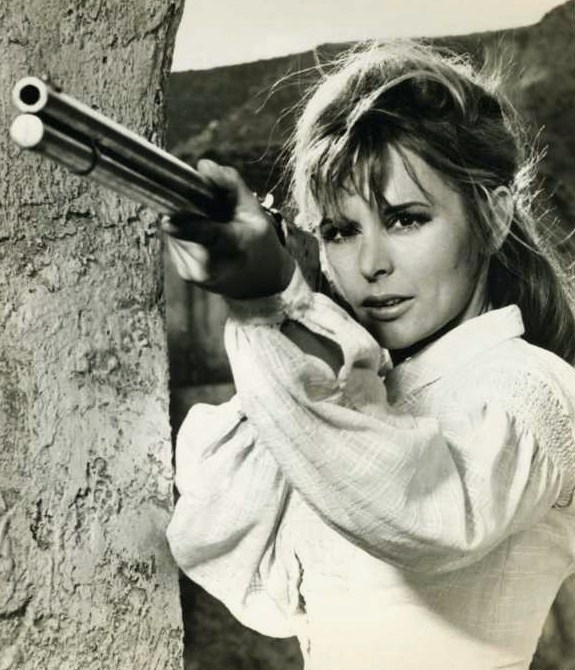
Marianna Hill in El Condor

The film was financed by National General Pictures, which in October 1968 announced it had purchased Steven Carabatsos' original script and would make the film the following March. Filming was pushed back; in April 1969, National General announced the movie as part of a slate of 13 films it would make, costing $35 million in all. John Guillermin was attached to direct.

The studio had recently made a film called Daddy's Gone A-Hunting based on a script by Larry Cohen. Cohen says the studio decided to make the movie, built a fort and town in Almería, Spain, then decided they disliked the script; they paid Cohen to travel to Spain and write a new film around the existing sets. Cohen wrote a script they were happy with and Jim Brown and Lee Van Cleef were cast. According to Cohen, Van Cleef then changed his mind about doing the film on the advice of Alberto Grimaldi who said the actor's character Jaroo was ridiculous; Cohen persuaded Van Cleef to do it, arguing it was a comic role along the lines of Humphrey Bogart's character Charlie Allnut in The African Queen.

The casting of the two leads was announced in July 1969. Filming started in October 1969. Swedish actress Ewa Aulin, who had been in Candy, was originally meant to play the female lead Claudine. However, she quit the film, refusing to film nude scenes. She was replaced by Mariana Hill who said she would go nude: "If it's done well".

Cohen says that director Guillermin and producer Andre de Toth did not get along, in part because the latter wanted to direct. According to Cohen, de Toth took over from René Clément, the director on his previous movie Play Dirty, and wanted to do the same thing again. The conflict resulted in Guillermin and de Toth having a fistfight.

== Home media ==
The film was released on a fullscreen VHS in 1994, and a widescreen DVD by Warner Archive in 2009.

== Critical reaction ==
Roger Ebert of the Chicago Sun-Times gave El Condor a negative review, giving it one-and-a-half stars out of four. Ebert declared that "what El Condor lacks in intelligence, it makes up for in stupidity" and opined that the film contained nothing but cynical violence.

Larry Cohen later said he thought it "was not a good film. I don't think John Guillermin was a very good director. He and producer Andre De Toth had some awful fights over the picture. Personally, I don't think Lee Van Cleef captured the part in the way I'd written it. But the film was successful. This was when I realized I could talk to actors.... I was completely disillusioned about what other people did to my scripts, as with Daddy's Gone A-Hunting. So, that's when I made the decision to go ahead and make my own films."

== See also ==
- List of American films of 1970
