= Déjà Vu (1997 film) =

- Promotional poster
- Directed by: Henry Jaglom
- Written by: Victoria Foyt; Henry Jaglom
- Produced by: John Goldstone; Judith Wolinsky
- Starring: Stephen Dillane; Victoria Foyt; Vanessa Redgrave; Glynis Barber; Michael Brandon; Vernon Dobtcheff; Graydon Gould; Noel Harrison; Aviva Marks; Anna Massey; Rachel Kempson
- Cinematography: Hanania Baer
- Edited by: Henry Jaglom
- Music by: Gaili Schoen
- Distributed by: Lions Gate Films
- Release date: October 25, 1997
- Running time: 117 min
- Country: United States
- Language: English
- Box office: $1,086,181

Déjà Vu is a 1997 American dramatic romance film directed by Henry Jaglom. It stars Stephen Dillane, Victoria Foyt, and Vanessa Redgrave. It premiered at the American Film Institute Festival on 25 October 1997 and was released theatrically on 22 April 1998.

== Plot ==
Dana, a young American woman, is engaged to her business partner Alex, and they are renovating an old building into a boutique hotel. While on a trip to Israel she orders goods from the Arab market in Jerusalem. At a restaurant she is approached by an older woman who strikes up a conversation, saying that she is a French Jewess who returns regularly to Jerusalem, but prefers to stay at a hotel in Tel Aviv. Dana admires a beautiful butterfly pin she is wearing. So the lady asks Dana to pin it on herself, and tells her the sad story of how she fell in love with an American GI during World War 2, and they have two identical pins made to reflect their love relationship, even though he had a fiancée in the States. He leaves, promising to break off the engagement and return to her. But he doesn't, and eventually sends her a letter explaining that he is married, with a photo of their child. She says that she accepted the situation and managed to go on with her life and also marry someone. She then makes an excuse to go to the powder-room, and disappears, leaving Dana with the pin.

Dana then goes to Tel Aviv to find the stranger and return the pin. However she finds that the stranger's hotel had been demolished many years previously, making way for a new modern one.

Dana then goes to look for her in Paris, by asking jewellery shops in the area if they recognize the pin. She finds the manufacturer, but he has no records of the purchaser. He offers to make her engagement ring smaller, but while he is busy she sees a man lurking outside, and tries to follow him, thinking that somehow he is connected with the lady. He disappears and she continues to London on the channel train, forgetting her ring. At Dover acting on an impulse she gets off the train and goes walking on the cliffs (with the song “White cliffs of Dover” in background). She sees a man painting there, Sean, and strike up a conversation. They both feel a very strong attraction, and he offers to drive her to London. There he takes her to his studio. She likes a painting he has done of two lovers looking at the Eiffel tower and he gives it to her. They kiss but she is unwilling to go further and leaves. She goes to stay with an older couple, John and Fern, where Alex has already arrived and is waiting for her. Her friends are planning extensions to their house, and their architect and his wife (Claire) have also come to stay to work out the design. Dana is amazed to find that the architect is none other than Sean. Both Claire and Alex appear to be rather superficial and do not share their spouse's emotional and artistic passions.

John's sister Skelly also comes with a boy-friend. She is a flighty soul who never really settles anywhere or with anyone for long. She talks a lot about love and other free living.

Meanwhile, John and Skelly have to find accommodation for their elderly mother, and Skelly suggests she moves in with John and Fern as she her lifestyle would make caring for her mother inconvenient. Sean and Dana don't know how to deal with the sudden arrival of their soul-mates into their otherwise OK lives. Skelly advises them to go with her hearts. One thing leads to another and eventually Sean and Dana get a chance to be intimate together at Sean's studio. They decide to tell their partners and initiate his divorce and her broken engagement. There are huge scenes of distress, but Dana's mother phones from LA to tell her that her father has been admitted to hospital. Dana is devastated and flies home urgently with Alex. The hospital finds nothing wrong with her father.

Dana and Alex make wedding preparations, but while Dana is dressing on the big day her father speaks to her to see if she is certain that she really wants to marry Alex. Then her father gives her a special wedding gift he has kept for her. It is the other butterfly pin. Dana realizes he was the American GI, and asks whether he really loved the French stranger, and whether he regretted not marrying her. He says that he has thought of her every week, and that she was the love of his life.

So Dana calls off the wedding and flies to Sean in London, and they embrace passionately. Then Dana notices a painting of Sean's and realises that it is of the strange lady she met in Jerusalem, wearing the two pins. Sean says that it his mother. Dana tells him that she was the woman she met in Jerusalem who gave her the brooch, but he says that would not have been possible, as his mother has been dead for years. And so the children of the American soldier and the French shop-lady are united in love - Déjà vu! They go together to Paris to the scene of Sean's painting Dana admired on their first meeting, and we see that the painting is of them – Déjà vu again!

== Cast ==
- Stephen Dillane as Sean
- Victoria Foyt as Dana Howard
- Vanessa Redgrave as Skelly
- Glynis Barber as Claire
- Michael Brandon as Alex
- Vernon Dobtcheff as Konstantine
- Rachel Kempson as Skelly's mother
- Noel Harrison as John Stoner
- Anna Massey as Fern Stoner
- Aviva Marks as Woman in Cafe

== Reception ==
The film was generally well-received, it holds a 65% 'fresh' rating on Rotten Tomatoes. Empire gave the film 4 out of 5 stars, remarking that it is; "An honest look at the concept of love, as previously sold to us by the movies. It's romantic, but it's firmly grounded in reality. Overall, a true delight." The Los Angeles Times warmly praised the film comparing it favourably with others, "it has the easy elegance and verve of an Astaire-Rogers musical" and remarked that it "represents a new level of accomplishment for Jaglom". The newspaper continued to praise the performances, cinematography and notably "the suspense it generates". However, Steven Gaydos of Variety magazine felt the initial connection between the main characters "deprives the film of any tension, while the leads never supply the heat or chemistry that would at least partially sell the well-worn notion of Unstoppable Love that propels the storyline....'Deja Vu' proves that even passion ordained by the gods can’t overcome a commonplace script, stock characters and ordinary direction."
