= Mob Queen =

- Directed by: Jon Carnoy
- Written by: Mike Horelick
- Produced by: Jon Carnoy
- Starring: David Proval; Dan Moran; Candis Cayne; Tony Sirico
- Cinematography: Nils Kenaston
- Edited by: Anton Salaks
- Music by: Jonathan Cossu
- Distributed by: First Run Features
- Release date: 1998
- Running time: 87 minutes
- Country: United States
- Language: English

Mob Queen is a 1998 American romantic comedy directed by Jon Carnoy and written by Mike Horelick. starring David Proval, Dan Moran, and Candis Cayne. the film was released on January 27, 1998

== Plot ==
The film is set in Brooklyn in 1957. After the consigliere (assistant) to the Mafia Don dies, crushed by a crate of tuna-fish cans, small-time hood George sees his chance to move up. Together with his dim-witted sidekick, Dip, they celebrate with some prostitutes – George is ecstatic when treated to the oral talents of Glorice, the new girl on the docks. When they realize they've forgotten mob boss Joey "The Heart" Aorta's birthday, George suggests a date with the beautiful Glorice. But the date doesn't go well, and Aorta ends up with plate of spaghetti on his head. Fortunately, Aorta likes Glorice's tough style, and George and Dip celebrate. Their festivities are cut short when they discover that Glorice is actually a man.

The two try introducing Aorta to other women, but none can match up to Glorice because, as Aorta says, "She's got balls". The Mafia Don even thanks George with a kiss, and George panics, thinking he's received the ominous "Kiss of Death". But his fear is unfounded as Aorta promotes George to consigliere and throws him a party with a cake made by Mickey the Baker. As the assistant and new friend to the boss, George is forced to drive the two on a date which ends with Aorta on the receiving end of Glorice's oral talents. Aorta announces his engagement to Glorice with George to be best man, and the beautiful moll reveals to George her plan of blackmail. So George decides to hire hitman Briles, an expert assassin. But he fails when Glorice recognizes the hitman as a long-lost uncle, and the hitman is unwilling to kill a nephew in a dress.

George, dejected, walks the streets when he's suddenly tackled by a draft detective. George proves his undraftable 4-F status by showing his flat feet. Discovering Glorice in the draft detective's wanted file, George turns Glorice in to the Navy. When Glorice doesn't turn up at the wedding, Aorta cries on George's shoulder, believing Glorice left him at the altar. George and Dip celebrate. That is, until Glorice returns from the Navy with some sailors who beat George up. Glorice finds Aorta and convinces him to have a quick wedding. A bruised George drives to the church, deciding to take matters into his own hands. He intercepts Glorice in the women's room and shoves the gun into the back of her head. But he doesn't kill her. Instead, the two start kissing, completely in love. Aorta walks in and threatens to kill George for stealing his fiancé. To save George, Glorice reveals "her" tool, shocking Aorta, who dies of a heart attack. At Aorta's funeral, it becomes clear that George is now the new Don, Glorice his "Mob Queen".

== Cast ==
- David Proval as George Gianfranco
- Dan Moran as Dip McKenzie
- Candis Cayne as Glorice Kalsheim
- Tony Sirico as Joey (The Heart) Aorta
- Marlene Forte as Chica
- Mario Macaluso as Mr. Amato the Funeral Director
- Jerry Grayson as Briles The Hitman
- Gerry Cooney as Mickey The Baker
