= Tracks (1976 film) =

1976 American drama film by Henry Jaglom

- DVD cover
- Directed by: Henry Jaglom
- Written by: Henry Jaglom
- Produced by: Howard Zuker
- Starring: Dennis Hopper; Taryn Power; Dean Stockwell; Topo Swope; Alfred Ryder; Michael Emil; Zack Norman; Barbara Flood
- Cinematography: Paul Glickman
- Edited by: George Folsey Jr.
- Distributed by: Trio
- Release date: December 15, 1976; (Los Angeles)
- Running time: 90 minutes
- Country: United States
- Language: English

Tracks is a 1976 American drama film written and directed by Henry Jaglom and starring Dennis Hopper, Taryn Power and Dean Stockwell. The story involves a returned Vietnam veteran escorting a fellow soldier's coffin across the United States for burial.

== Plot ==
In 1973, 1st Sgt. Jack Falen (Hopper) returns from the Vietnam War to the United States to escort a friend's body for a hometown burial. Once in the US, Jack travels across the country via train (hence the film's title), where he meets the mysterious Mark (Stockwell) and the alluring university student Stephanie (Power). During the trip, Jack falls in love with Stephanie, but destroys the relationship through constant flashbacks to combat.

== Cast ==
- Dennis Hopper as First Sergeant Jack Falen
- Taryn Power as Stephanie
- Dean Stockwell as Mark
- Topo Swope as Chloe
- Alfred Ryder as The Man
- Zack Norman as Gene
- Michael Emil as Emile
- Barbara Flood as The Lady
- Frank McRae as Train Coachman
- James Frawley as Train Passenger
- Sally Kirkland as Train Passenger

== Production ==
Following the production of A Safe Place, Jaglom spent five years putting together $1 million to shoot Tracks.

== Reception ==
On the review aggregator website Rotten Tomatoes, 50% of eight critics' reviews are positive, with an average rating of 4.3/10.
