= Queen of the Lot =

- Film poster
- Directed by: Henry Jaglom
- Written by: Henry Jaglom
- Produced by: Rosemary Marks
- Starring: Tanna Frederick; Noah Wyle
- Cinematography: Hanania Baer
- Edited by: Ron Vignone
- Music by: Harriet Schock
- Distributed by: Rainbow Releasing
- Release date: November 19, 2010 (Southern California)
- Running time: 120 minutes
- Country: United States
- Language: English

Queen of the Lot is a 2010 American comedy-drama film written and directed by Henry Jaglom and starring Tanna Frederick and Noah Wyle. It is the sequel to Jaglom's 2006 film Hollywood Dreams.

== Plot ==
During a trip to meet her movie-star boyfriend's family, an actress falls in love with a failed writer who happens to be her boyfriend's brother.

== Cast ==
- Tanna Frederick
- Noah Wyle
- Christopher Rydell
- Peter Bogdanovich
- Dennis Christopher
- Zack Norman
- Paul Sand
- David Proval
- Kathryn Crosby
- Mary Crosby
- Jack Heller
- Ron Vignone
- Diane Salinger
- Sabrina Jaglom

== Release ==
The film was released in theaters in Southern California on November 19, 2010.

== Reception ==
The film has a 36% rating on Rotten Tomatoes. Andrew Schenker of Slant Magazine awarded the film one and a half stars out of four. Colin Covert of the Star Tribune awarded it two stars out of four. Wesley Morris of The Boston Globe gave the film two and a half stars out of four.

Andrew Barker of Variety gave the film a negative review and wrote that "this meandering, talky film-industry satire never manages to rouse itself from a near-comatose level of self-satisfaction."

Kirk Honeycutt of The Hollywood Reporter also gave the film a negative review and wrote, "Henry Jaglom again tries to mix comedy with melodrama with decidedly mixed results."

The New York Times gave the film a positive review and wrote, "Juggling love story, jewel heist, suicide and a hilarious 12-step meeting, Jaglom displays his usual loosey-goosey style and insider wit."
