= Mike Falkow =

South African actor and model

- Born: Mike Falkow; 25 August 1977 (age 48); Durban, South Africa
- Occupations: Actor, Writer, Director, Producer, Surfer
- Years active: 1999–present
- Spouse: Tracee L. Nichols (2002–2013)
- Relatives: Cokey Falkow (brother)
- Website: https://mikefalkow.com

Mike Falkow (born 25 August 1977), is a South African actor, writer, director and producer as well as a former professional surfer. He is best known for the roles in the films Invictus, Deceived and Smokin' Aces.

== Personal life ==
Falkow was born on 25 August 1977 in Durban, South Africa. He has one brother, Cokey Falkow, an actor and stand-up comedian.

== Career ==
He has a degree in Design and Publishing and worked as a designer and creative director for media companies, agencies and corporations. Before entering acting, he worked as a professional surfer around the world for decades. Then he settled in Los Angeles and worked as the Art Director for Rogue Magazine in Los Angeles.

In 2001, he made his television debut with the serial That '70s Show. In the same year, he made the film debut with Dawn of Our Nation and played the role as a "British soldier". Then he appeared in many films and played supportive roles including; Smokin' Aces, Crazy and The House Bunny. Since 2009, he got the opportunity to appear in many international television serials and films such as Invictus, Law & Order: LA, Free Willy: Escape From Pirate's Cove, Scorpion, Deceived and NCIS.

== Filmography ==
Year	Film	Role	Genre	Ref.
2001	That '70s Show	Actor	TV series	
2001	You Too Could Be a Winner!	Game Show Host	Short film	
2001	The Brothers Grim	Bob	Short film	
2001	Dawn of Our Nation	British soldier	Film	
2003	Fastlane	Club Guy	TV series	
2006	Smokin' Aces	Freeman Heller	Film	
2008	Crazy	Jingle Bell Rock Musician	Film	
2008	Struck	Office Worker	Short film	
2008	The House Bunny	Karaoke Trio	Film	
2008	A Christmas Proposal	Actor	TV movie	
2009	Invictus	Stadium Announcer	Film	
2010	Law & Order: LA	Henry Franklin	TV series	
2010	Melon	Jack, Producer	Video short	
2010	Free Willy: Escape from Pirate's Cove	Actor	Film	
2011	The Online Gamer	Priest	TV series	
2011	Handsome Sportz Klub	Gunther, Director, Writer, Producer, Editor	TV series	
2012	Stranded	Jan Wilimse	Short film	
2013	Elegy for a Revolutionary	Radio Announcer	Short film	
2013	The Stafford Project	Anton	TV series	
2014	Glam Tips for Broke Ass Chicks	Sven	TV series	
2015	The Time We're in	Gabriel	Short film	
2016	Scorpion	Richards	TV series	
2016	Deceived	Laz, Writer, Producer, Second unit director	Film	
2016	Criminal Minds: Beyond Borders	Kurt Adams	TV series	
2016	NCIS	Jim Bruno	TV series	
2017	In Search of Fellini	Dublonsky	Film	
2017	Train to Zakopané	Semyon Sapir	Film	
2018	All Wrong	Uber Driver / Fred Williams	TV series	
2019	The Rookie	Bruce	TV series	
2020	In Hope of Nothing	Mickey Wilson, Writer	Short film	
2021	Something About Her	Jim	Film	
2022	The Orville	Krill Dignitary	TV series	
TBD	Subversion	Writer	Film	
