= Save the Pearls: Revealing Eden =

Young adult novel by Victoria Foyt

Revealing Eden
- First edition hardcover
- Author: Victoria Foyt
- Language: English
- Series: Save the Pearls
- Genre: Dystopian, Science fiction, Young Adult, Romance
- Publisher: Sand Dollar Press Inc
- Publication date: January 10, 2012
- Publication place: United States
- Media type: Print (hardback & e-book)
- Pages: 320 (first edition, hardback)
- ISBN: 0983650322 (first edition, hardback)
- Followed by: Adapting Eden

Save the Pearls: Revealing Eden is a 2012 young adult novel by American author Victoria Foyt and the first book in the Save the Pearls series. The book is set in a post-apocalyptic dystopian society and follows the titular character of Eden as she attempts to move outside of her set station in life and find a way to survive outside the norms set by society.

Book two of the series, Adapting Eden, was released in the spring of 2013.

== Summary ==
The book follows Eden, a young white woman who has been raised in a post-apocalyptic environment. A solar burst has decimated nearly all life on Earth, forcing everyone to live underground to avoid "the Heat", the world's name for skin cancer. The underground society relies on a racial system where the darker your skin naturally is, the more likely your rate of survival. Each race is given a name for their station, with white people being named Pearls and black people being named Coals. Eden spends most of her days in a research assistant position which she achieved due to her father's importance to a secret assignment, and most of her nights hoping that her boyfriend Jamal will one day choose her as his mate. She is often at odds with Ronson Bramford, a rich Coal who has hired her father and occasionally resents the fact that she must wear dark make-up over her body to hide her skin color.

When the scientific experiment run by her father and Bramford is attacked by a political group known as the Federation of Free Peoples, a terrorist organization that believes Pearls to be inferior, Eden barely manages to escape with her father and Bramford. Once outside, Eden discovers that the experiment's purpose was to infuse humanity with the DNA of several animals to ensure a higher rate of survival and that Bramford was the test subject. Bramford brings Eden and her father to a village hidden in a rainforest that had managed to survive the solar blast, and where he and Eden's father plan to progress further with the experiment.

Those living on the surface have survived the radiation due to a miraculous healing plant that they chew into a paste. When Eden's father is injured, she and Bramford have to go on a long hike through the mountains to get a sample and save his life. While in the grove of healing plants, they meet a few Aztec warriors who live in the area.

As time passes Eden slowly falls in love with Bramford and discovers his previous relationship with a Pearl, and that he had an albino son with her, something which is seen as unbearable in that society. His son, Logan, has lived his entire life hidden on the surface in a small shack, only daring to come out at nighttime.

The preparations for the next experiment are eventually finished, only for the village to come under attack by the Federation of Free Peoples. Some of the nearby Aztec warriors show up and ambush the FFP forces. The group is defeated and Eden makes the choice to undergo the infusion of animal DNA along with Logan.

== Publishing ==
Revealing Eden was published on January 10, 2012, by Sand Dollar Press Inc, a publishing company founded by Foyt.

In August 2012 Weird Tales magazine announced that they would publish an excerpt from the novel's first chapter. The magazine cancelled plans to publish the excerpt after readers and authors threatened to boycott the magazine. John Harlacher removed a post by editor Marvin Kaye that defended the book and posted a message apologizing to readers, a move that was criticized by ThinkProgress's Alyssa Rosenberg.

== Reception ==
Imogen Russell Williams in the Guardian panned the book, saying "there is barely a detectable sign of any plot; the whole thing is remarkable for repetition, [and] incoherence", and also criticized the book's handling of race.

In the book, racial groups receive titles according to their ethnicity, with characters of different races receiving the names "Coal," "Pearl," "Amber," “Tiger's Eye," or "Cotton," which have connotations of being racial slurs.

Foyt responded to the criticism by stating that she had not intended the book's contents or advertising to be racist and that her intention was to write a novel addressing the issue of racism, interracial love, and global warming.

== Trilogy ==
Foyt intended for Revealing Eden to be the first entry in a trilogy entitled Save the Pearls. Book two in the series, Adapting Eden, was published in 2013 through Sand Dollar Press. The novel places Eden in a rainforest that has inexplicably survived the solar flare and where Bramford has been hiding his albino son. The sequel includes both technology and science as well as magic. In 2013 Foyt commented that she was in the process of writing part three, Freeing Eden.

== See also ==
- Noughts & Crosses series by Malorie Blackman
