= Ben et Thomas =

Television series

- Created by: Jon Carnoy and Mike Horelick
- Starring: Anthony Marocco; Amezienne Rehaz; Daphnée Chollet
- Country of origin: France
- No. of episodes: 13

Production
- Running time: 25 minutes

Original release
- Network: France 4
- Release: 2008 – 2008

Ben et Thomas is a French TV series created by Mike Horelick and Jon Carnoy that first aired on May 31, 2008 on France 4.

== Synopsis ==
Ben Rosenberg and Thomas Verne are two high school friends into skateboarding. One is a geek, the other is more down-to-earth, but they make a great pair. However, their friendship is tested when Liselott, a beautiful blond-haired person, arrives at school.

The series revolves around these teenagers and their family, school, and love life.

== Cast ==
- Anthony Marocco : Ben Rosenberg
- Amezienne Rehaz : Thomas Verne
- Daphnée Chollet : Martine
- Jemima West : Liselott Karlsson
- Tony Notot : Cotard
- Pauline Prévost : Sandrine Broussard
- Samy Gharbi : Jean Verne
- Bénédicte Roy : Claire
- Pascal Decolland : Roland
- Victoria Monfort : Anne
- Diane Landrot : Mathilde
- Brigitte Sy : Madame Bouillon

== Episodes ==
=== Season 1 (2008) ===
1 (1-01)	The Hill (La Pente)
2 (1-02)	Martine Love Affair (Ben et Martine)
3 (1-03)	Liselott Arrives (L'arrivée de Liselott)
4 (1-04)	Teacher's Affair (Canular)
5 (1-05)	Mercier, Le Meurtrier (Lemercier, le meurtrier)
6 (1-06)	Lise Choice (Le choix de Liselott)
7 (1-07)	Dine & Dash (Restau-Basket)
8 (1-08)	Rap Group (Rap Group)
9 (1-09)	Art Show (L'expo)
10 (1-10)	Dogtown (La compète)
11 (1-11)	Cool Crowd (Bobard)
12 (1-12)	Slalom (Slalom)
13 (1-13)	Petit Louis (Petit Louis)

== Trivia ==
- Victoria Monfort, who appears in episode 7, is the daughter of famous French sportscaster Nelson Monfort.
- Young actor Azdine Keloua was replaced by Amezienne Rehaz as Thomas Verne at the last minute.
- The creators of the series, Mike Horelick and Jon Carnoy, are both skateboard fans and are the basis for the characters.
- The series is inspired by the feature Pee Stains and Other Disasters.
