= Chief Zabu =

- Theatrical release poster
- Directed by: Howard Zuker; Neil Cohen
- Written by: Neil Cohen; Nancy Zuker; Howard Zuker
- Produced by: Norman Leigh; Neil Cohen; Nancy Zuker; Howard Zuker
- Starring: Allen Garfield; Zack Norman; Allan Arbus; Ed Lauter; Manu Tupou
- Music by: Andrew Asch
- Release date: 2016
- Running time: 75 minutes
- Country: United States
- Language: English
- Budget: $187,966

Chief Zabu is a long-unreleased film that was written, produced and directed by Neil Cohen and Zack Norman (under his birth name, Howard Zuker). It is a socio-political comedy about a New York real estate developer who tries to take over a Polynesian nation. The film starred Norman, Allen Garfield and Allan Arbus. Production began in 1986 but, due to various issues, Cohen and Norman were unable to complete the film until 2016. It premiered at Laemmle Theatres' Monica Film Center on October 28, 2016 and screened a week later, on November 7, at the Fort Lauderdale International Film Festival ("FLIFF"). Trailers and clips are available through both Vimeo and YouTube. On August 16, 2017, Zabu's co-writer/directors were pictured on the front page of the New York Times Arts Section with a history of the film's unique and unusual journey.

A long running advertisement for the film in Variety was the source of a recurring joke on Mystery Science Theater 3000.

== Synopsis ==
The film follows an ambitious New York realtor who dreams of political power and decides to accomplish this by taking over a Polynesian nation.

== Cast ==
- Allen Garfield as Ben Sydney
- Zack Norman as Sammy Brooks
- Allan Arbus as George Dankworth
- Marianna Hill as Jennifer Holding
- Manu Tupou as Chief Henri Zabu
- Ed Lauter as Skip Keisel
- Joseph Warren as Arthur Keisel
- Betty Karlen as Linda Gato
- Shirley Stoler as Joan Ironwood
- Lucianne Buchanan as Monica Keisel
- Ferdinand Mayne as Seth the Butler
- Charles Siegal as Seth's Assistant
- Tom Nardini as the Gatekeeper
- Harsh Nayyar as the Prime Minister

== Merchandise ==
At his TeePublic website, American entrepreneur Josh Abramson offers a T-shirt bearing an image of the Variety advertisement that ran consistently between 1985 and 1988.

== Reception ==
Film writer Larry Langman saw the "poorly received" 1980s preview version and dismissed the film as "ineptly produced comedy."

Reviewing the 2016 release, Sheri Linden of The Hollywood Reporter gave the film a mixed review, calling its comedy "uneven", while still retaining "a satirical bite." Michael Rechtshaffen of the Los Angeles Times called it a "tiresomely talky would-be satire" that "plays like bargain basement Barry Levinson".

In anticipation of the film's screening at FLIFF, a Fort Lauderdale restaurant introduced a specialty cocktail named the "Chief Zabu".

Following a series of festival and awards-qualifying screening runs, blogger Chad Sternberger of the popular website The Studio Exec implored Hollywood distributors: "For heaven's sake could someone please release Chief Zabu." The film was one of 336 titles to qualify for the 89th Academy Awards.

Actress Marianna Hill, one of the stars of the film, spoke at length about her experience working on Chief Zabu on the movie/TV blog "Hill Place".
