= Always (1985 film) =

- Directed by: Henry Jaglom
- Written by: Henry Jaglom
- Starring: Patrice Townsend; Henry Jaglom; Joanna Frank
- Release date: 1985
- Country: United States
- Language: English

Always (also known as Always, But Not Forever) is a 1985 comedy drama film starring, written and directed and by Henry Jaglom.

== Plot ==
A couple, on the verge of divorce, find themselves questioning their decision to separate when fellow friends and neighbors, oblivious to their marital troubles, assemble at their Los Angeles house for a July 4 weekend party.

== Title controversy ==
Always director Henry Jaglom was asked in the media about how he felt about Steven Spielberg calling his 1989 movie Always, the same title Jaglom used for his 1985 film. To which Jaglom responded:

"Personally, I am delighted," Jaglom said, "as it seems to me this will help sell quite a few videocassettes for me, once our two movies find themselves side by side in the video store bins, rentable at two bucks each, no matter what their original budget."

== Critical reception ==
Vincent Canby of The New York Times wrote that the film, "Jaglom's fifth and most amiable film to date, is set in the Los Angeles of today, but its sensibilities are rooted in the 1960's, the decade of the so-called film explosion, when anyone with access to a camera could call himself a film maker."

Time Out criticized the movie's characterization, writing: "Audiences will have no problem relating to the universal desire for love and affection, nor in identifying with Jaglom's predicament. What they might find difficult is actually liking any of the characters involved."
