= Babyfever =

- Directed by: Henry Jaglom
- Written by: Henry Jaglom; Victoria Foyt
- Produced by: Judith Wolinsky
- Starring: Victoria Foyt
- Cinematography: Hanania Baer
- Edited by: Henry Jaglom
- Production company: Jagtoria
- Distributed by: Rainbow Film
- Release date: 1994
- Running time: 110 minutes
- Country: United States
- Language: English

Babyfever is a 1994 American comedy-drama film directed by Henry Jaglom and starring Victoria Foyt.

== Synopsis ==
A woman finds herself caught between her present partner and the sudden reappearance of a former flame.

== Cast ==
- Victoria Foyt as Gena
- Matt Salinger as James
- Dinah Lenney as Roz
- Eric Roberts as Anthony
- Frances Fisher as Rosie
- Elaine Kagan as Milly
- Zack Norman as Mark

== Reception ==
The film has a 40% rating on Rotten Tomatoes. Melissa Pierson of Entertainment Weekly graded the film a B−. Lisa Schwarzbaum, also of Entertainment Weekly, graded the film a C. Roger Ebert awarded the film three stars.
