= Two Ways Home =

- Directed by: Ron Vignone
- Written by: Richard Schinnow
- Produced by: Ron Vignone; Kimberly Busbee
- Starring: Tanna Frederick; Tom Bower; Rylie Behr
- Cinematography: Christopher C. Pearson
- Edited by: Jorge Alarcon-Swaby; Kate Noonan
- Music by: Kevin Brough
- Production company: Feral Dog Productions
- Distributed by: Gravitas Ventures
- Release dates: 15 June 2019 (Dances with Films Festival); 29 December 2020 (US)
- Running time: 92 minutes
- Country: United States
- Language: English

Two Ways Home is a 2019 American drama film directed by Ron Vignone, starring Tanna Frederick, Tom Bower and Rylie Behr.

== Cast ==
- Tanna Frederick as Kathy
- Tom Bower as Walter
- Rylie Behr as Cori
- Joel West as Junior
- Kim Grimaldi as Barbara
- Richard Maynard as Ed
- Pat Frey as Squibb

== Release ==
The film was released in the United States on 29 December 2020.

== Reception ==
Frank Scheck of The Hollywood Reporter wrote that the film's "palpable sense of place" and the "terrific" performances "compensates" for the film's "contrivances".

Diane Carson of KDHX wrote that the film is "honest in its invitation to consider those involved in and affected by mental illness, knowing the ripple effects reach far and wide" and "furthers the knowledge that everyone needs more information and can be educated through a sustained commitment if they only care."

John Sooja of Common Sense Media rated the film two stars out of five and wrote that while the film is "grounded" and "well-acted", the issues with the plot and the writing "hinder its emotional punch".
