= David Proval =

American actor (born 1942)

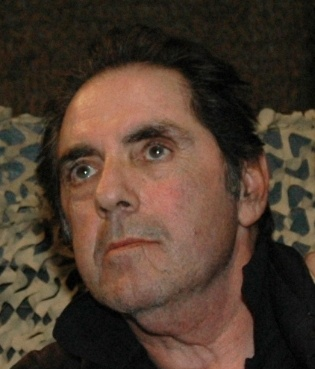
- Proval in 2008
- Born: May 20, 1942 (age 84); New York City, U.S.
- Occupation: Actor
- Years active: 1970–present

David Proval (born May 20, 1942) is an American actor best known for his roles as Tony DeVienazo in the Martin Scorsese film Mean Streets (1973), Snooze in The Shawshank Redemption (1994), Siegfried in Four Rooms (1995) and as Richie Aprile on the HBO television series The Sopranos (1999–2007).

== Biography ==
Proval was born in Brooklyn, New York into a Jewish family, the son of Clara Katz, an actress from Bucharest, Romania.

The films he has appeared in include Mean Streets, The Shawshank Redemption, The Phantom, Mob Queen, Four Rooms, UHF, Innocent Blood, The Siege, The Monster Squad, Bookies, and Balls of Fury, had cameos in The Brady Bunch Movie, and Smokin' Aces, and has had recurring roles in television shows such as Picket Fences, Boomtown and Everybody Loves Raymond. He appeared on Kojak, The Equalizer, Miami Vice, and Friday the 13th: The Series. He appeared in the 14th episode of The West Wing, "Take This Sabbath Day", as Toby Ziegler's rabbi.

In 1977, his voice was heard in the cult animated film Wizards, as the robot assassin Necron 99. In 2004, he played adult twin brothers James and Edward Talley in the Hallmark Channel original movie Murder Without Conviction.

== Films ==
Year	Title	Role	Notes
1973	Mean Streets	Tony	
1973	Cinderella Liberty	Sailor 1	
1975	Rafferty and the Gold Dust Twins	The Incessant Talker	
1976	Harry and Walter Go to New York	Ben	
1977	Wizards	Peace	Voice
1978	Nunzio	Nunzio	
1981	Night City Angels	Marty	
1982	Hey Good Lookin'	Crazy Shapiro	
1983	The Star Chamber	Officer Nelson	
1987	The Monster Squad	Pilot	
1988	Vice Versa	Turk/Lillian Brookmeyer	
1988	Shakedown	Larry	
1989	UHF	Head Thug	
1991	The Walter Ego	Phil Reardon	Short film
1992	Innocent Blood	Lennie	
1993	Romeo is Bleeding	Scully	
1993	Strike a Pose	McTeague	
1994	Being Human	George	
1994	The Shawshank Redemption	Snooze	
1995	The Brady Bunch Movie	Electrician	
1995	Four Rooms	Sigfried	Segment: The Wrong Man
1995	To the Limit	Joey Bambino	
1995	The Courtyard	Dog Man	
1996	The Phantom	Charlie Zephro	
1996	Skyscraper	Security Guard	Uncredited, Direct-to-video
1997	The Relic	Guard Johnson	
1997	Dumb Luck in Vegas	Frank	
1998	Mob Queen	George Gianfranco	Second lead-role
1998	The Siege	Danny Sussman	
2000	Newsbreak	Jacob Johnson	
2001	Zigs (aka Double Down)	Mike's Dad	Direct-to-video
2001	The Hollywood Sign	Charlie	
2002	13 Moons	Mo Potter	
2002	White Boy	Jim Lovero	
2003	Bookies	Larry	
2004	Just Desserts	Uncle Fabrizio	
2005	Miss Congeniality 2: Armed and Fabulous	Mr. Grant	Uncredited
2005	The Circle	Dad	
2005	Angels with Angles	Howie Gold	
2006	Hollywood Dreams	Caesar DiNatale	
2006	Smokin' Aces	Victor Padiche	
2007	The Unknown Trilogy	Lucky Smith	Segment: Frankie the Squirrel
2007	Balls of Fury	Mob Boss	
2008	Stiletto	Mohammed	
2008	Phantom Punch	Savino	
2009	Irene in Time	Norm Florentino	
2009	The Deported	Chabuyo	
2010	Pete Smalls Is Dead	Nimmo	
2010	Queen of the Lot	Caesar	
2011	Adventures of Serial Buddies	Big Chicken	
2012	Just 45 Minutes from Broadway	Larry Cooper	
2012	Silent But Deadly	Giovanni	
2012	Jerry and Tom	Sal	Short film
2013	Last Curtain Call	Henry	
2014	The M Word	Sam Sachs	Uncredited
2015	Sharkskin	Uncle Charlie	
2015	Ovation	Caesar	
2016	The Brooklyn Banker	Manny	
2017	High and Outside	Don	
2017	Wayward Pilgrim	Uncle Charlie	
2017	Dakota	Bob Herbert	
2017	Rusty	Uncle Charlie	
2017	Lost Angelas	Vince Rose	
2018	Papa	David Dresner	
2018	Cabaret Maxime	Mr. Gus	
2019	Rusty	Uncle Charlie	
2019	Lost Angelas	Vince Rose	
2019	Five Families	Benny	Short film
2021	Flinch	Lee Vaughn	
2026	The Projectionist	Aaron	

== Television ==
Year	Title	Role	Notes
1973	Kojak	Calvelli	Episode: "Siege of Terror"
1975	Foster and Laurie	Ianucci	Made-for-TV film
1976	Police Story	Cecil Gaines	Episode: "Bought and Paid For"
1976	Monster Squad	Plunder	Episode: "No Face"
1977	Nowhere to Hide	Rick	Made-for-TV film
1983	Knight Rider	Robber with Gold Watch	Uncredited, Episode: "Silent Knight"
1984	Cagney & Lacey	Felix Parinchinko	Episode: "Taxicab Murders"
1985	The Equalizer	Goldman	Episode: "The Equalizer" (Pilot)
1985	Miami Vice	I.A. Detective Louie Gallo	Episode: "The Dutch Oven"
1985	Fame	Hunk Pepitone / Doran	2 episodes: "White Light" & "Dreams"
1986	Courage	Angelo Cervi	Made-for-TV film
1988–1989	Friday's Curse	Eric / Victor Haas	2 episodes: "13 O'Clock" & "Badge of Honor"
1989	Perfect Witness	Luca	Made-for-TV film
1990	L.A. Law	William Mayer	Uncredited, Episode: "On Your Honor"
1990	The Marshall Chronicles	Mr. Gelormino	Episode: "My Cheatin' Heart"
1991	Quantum Leap	Dr. Masters	Episode: "Shock Theater - October 3, 1954"
1991	Palace Guard	Belarosa	Episode: The Three-Minute Egg
1992–1995	Picket Fences	Frank the Potato Man	3 episodes
1995	The Marshal	Marvin Kendall	Episode: "The Heartbreak Kid"
1996	The Rockford Files: Friends and Foul Play	Joseph Happy Cartello	Made-for-TV film
1996	L.A. Firefighters	n/a	Episode: "So What Else Happened"
1996	Rolling Thunder	n/a	Made-for-TV film
1997	The Pretender	Carl Will	Episode: "Prison Story"
1998	Felicity	Mr. Kinney	Episode: "Hot Objects"
1998	Brimstone	Harry	Episode: "Repentance"
2000–2001	Everybody Loves Raymond	Marco Fogagnola / Signore	6 episodes
2000	The West Wing	Rabbi Glassman	Episode: "Take This Sabbath Day"
2000–2004	The Sopranos	Richie Aprile	10 episodes
2001	The Fighting Fitzgeralds	Joe Sambarelli	Episode: "The Loud Man"
2001	James Dean	Daniel Mann	Made-for-TV film
2001	Judging Amy	Henry Pagano	Episode: "The Last Word"
2002	The Division	Edgar Lessing	Episode: "Long Day's Journey"
2002–2003	Boomtown	Paul Turcotte	3 episodes
2003	A.U.S.A.	Carmine Schiavelli	Episode: "Till Death Do Us Part"
2011	Workers' Comp	Joe	Made-for-TV film
2004	Murder Without Conviction	James Talley	Made-for-TV film
2016	Vinyl	Vince Finestra	2 episodes: "He in Racist Fire" & "The Racket"
2016	Aquarius	Danilo Hodiak	Episode: "While My Guitar Gently Weeps"
2022	Grace and Frankie	Mr. Purcelli	Episode: "The Raccoon"
