= Irene in Time =

- Theatrical release poster
- Directed by: Henry Jaglom
- Cinematography: Hanania Baer
- Music by: Harriet Schock
- Release date: June 19, 2009
- Running time: 95 minutes
- Country: United States
- Language: English

Irene in Time is a 2009 American independent film directed by Henry Jaglom.

It marked the second collaboration between director Jaglom and actress Tanna Frederick, who also starred in Jaglom's 2006 film Hollywood Dreams. Irene in Time also starred Victoria Tennant, Lanre Idewu, and Andrea Marcovicci.

== Plot ==
Relationships between fathers and daughters and the lifelong consequences of the relationships are examined.
