= Ovation (film) =

- Directed by: Henry Jaglom
- Written by: Henry Jaglom; Ron Vignone
- Starring: Tanna Frederick; James Denton
- Cinematography: Hanania Baer
- Release date: December 2015 (Santa Fe)
- Running time: 102 minutes 105 minutes
- Country: United States
- Language: English

Ovation is a 2015 American comedy drama film written by Henry Jaglom and Ron Vignone, directed by Jaglom and starring Tanna Frederick and James Denton.

== Plot ==
A theatre actress who career is in a funk must choose between her heart and mind when she meets a charming television star who is reassessing his own professional life and considering a move into the theatre.

== Cast ==
- Tanna Frederick as Maggie Chase
- James Denton as Stewart Henry
- Stephanie Fredricks as Sybil Edwards
- Cathy Arden as Rosalind Goodman
- Simon Jaglom as Michael 'Mouse' Lambert

== Release ==
The film premiered at the Santa Fe Film Festival in December 2015.

== Reception ==
The film has a 38% rating on Rotten Tomatoes based on eight reviews.

Jeannette Catsoulis of The New York Times gave the film a positive review and wrote, "Dependably genuine, and suffused with Mr. Jaglom’s increasingly mellow intelligence, this lighthearted backstage drama will feel to his fans like a gathering of familiars."

Katie Walsh of the Los Angeles Times also gave the film a positive review and wrote, "Ovation is a loving tribute to the theater, to the intoxicating power of live performance and to the bond among performers and crew, from the lighting guy in the booth down to the star on the stage."

Walter Addiego of the San Francisco Chronicle gave the film a negative review and wrote, "You may get the sense you’ve wandered into a super-intense acting class or someone’s therapy session — a hothouse atmosphere that’s oppressive."
