= Dina Jacobsen =

British film director

Dina Haeri (previously Jacobsen) is a movie producer, screenwriter, and director.
