= Candis Cayne =

American actress and performance artist

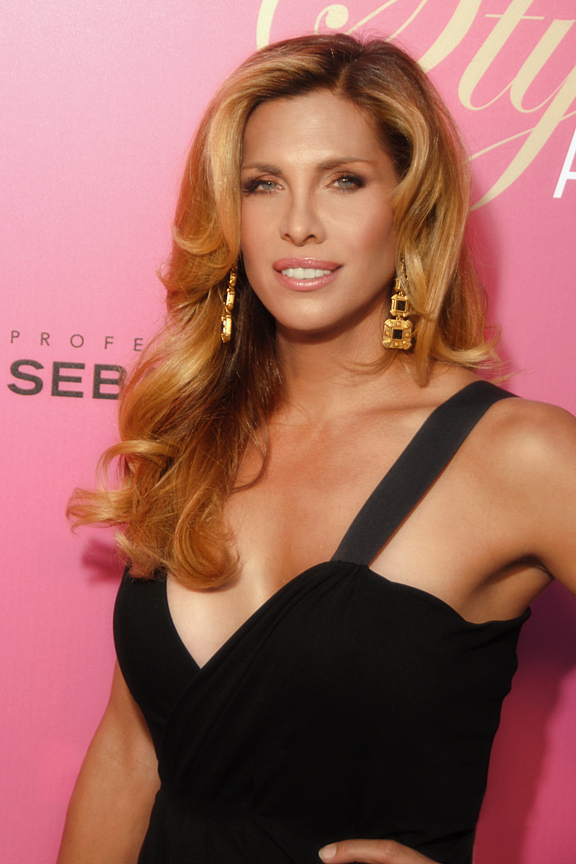
- Cayne in 2009
- Born: August 29, 1971 (age 55); Maui, Hawaii, U.S.
- Occupations: Actress, performance artist
- Years active: 1995–present
- Partner: Marco McDermott (2002–2010)
- Website: www.candiscayne.com

Candis Cayne (born August 29, 1971) is an American actress and performance artist. Cayne performed in New York City nightclubs in drag since the 1990s, and came out as transgender in 1996; Cayne came to national attention in 2007 for portraying transgender mistress Carmelita on ABC's prime time drama Dirty Sexy Money. The role makes Cayne the first transgender actress to play a recurring transgender character in primetime. She is perhaps best known for her recurring role as the Fairy Queen on the fantasy series The Magicians.

== Early life ==
Cayne has a fraternal twin brother named Dylan. Their parents taught at a Waldorf School, and the family lived on campus. She graduated from Henry Perrine Baldwin High School in Hawaii in 1989 and then spent a year in Los Angeles, where she trained as a dancer.

== Career ==
Cayne then moved to New York in the early 1990s, making a name for herself as a choreographer and drag performer. About three years after her arrival in NYC, Cayne realized that the term transgender described how she felt about herself. Already performing as "Candis Cayne" at New York gay bar Boy Bar and as a featured performer at Tour in New York's Chelsea, the entertainer also participated in Wigstock, the annual drag festival in Manhattan's East Village. In 1995 Cayne appeared in the related documentary film Wigstock: The Movie, the comedy-drama film Stonewall, and the Universal Studios comedy feature film To Wong Foo, Thanks for Everything! Julie Newmar, for which she also did choreography.

In 1996, she had a supporting role in the comedy-drama film Always Something Better (a.k.a. Never Look Back). In 1997 Cayne was in a documentary called Drag Time on HBO along with many other famous New York nightlife performers. Candis also co-starred in the music video for RuPaul's "A Little Bit of Love" with female impersonator Jazzmun. Cayne also starred as the title character in the 1998 independent film Mob Queen, and won the 2001 Miss Continental pageant. In 2007 Cayne was cast as Annaka Manners in the 2007 RuPaul film Starrbooty.

From 2007 to 2008 Cayne played Carmelita Rainer, a trans woman having an affair with married New York Attorney General Patrick Darling (played by William Baldwin), on the ABC prime time drama Dirty Sexy Money. She had a recurring role as the transgender character Alexis Stone in season six of Nip/Tuck. Cayne has appeared as a judge and Dean of Dance on RuPaul's Drag U. As a dance teacher, she taught contestants original choreography to "No Scrubs" by TLC and Kelis's song "Milkshake". In 2011, she guest-starred on the TV show Necessary Roughness as Geraldine.

From 2015 to 2016, Cayne appeared in seasons 1 and 2 of Caitlyn Jenner's reality show I Am Cait.

From 2017 to 2018, Cayne played the role of The Fairy Queen in the Syfy series The Magicians. Cayne appeared in the 2020 documentary Disclosure: Trans Lives on Screen. She also hosted the third edition of Werq the World's livestreamed series.

== Activism and personal life ==
Cayne began transitioning circa 1996. Cayne has stated, "I'm not trying to be a spokeswoman for the transgender community; I just want to be looked at as a living, breathing, happy human being." She calls the LGBT community "the last great minority" and supports LGBT+ rights charity GLAAD.

In August 2015, Candis Cayne teamed up with the global LGBT social network MOOVZ as the new global creative director.

For over eight years, ending in 2010, Cayne was in a relationship with DJ Marco McDermott, to whom she referred as her husband. During that time, she helped raise McDermott's daughter, Satori, from a previous relationship.

In 2016, during season 2 of the reality show I Am Cait, Cayne explored the possibility of adopting as a single mother.

== Filmography ==
=== Film ===
Year	Title	Role	Notes
1995	Wigstock: The Movie	Herself	Credited as Brendan McDaniel
1995	Stonewall	Diva	
1995	To Wong Foo, Thanks for Everything! Julie Newmar	Candis Cayne	Credited as Brendan McDaniel
1996	Always Something Better	Billee	
1997	Drag Time	Candis Cayne	
1998	Mob Queen	Glorice Kalsheim	
1999	Charlie!	—N/a	Short film
1999	In the Closet	—N/a	
2006	My Heart Belongs to Data	Candis	Short film
2007	Starrbooty	Annaka Manners	
2008	Libanesa Loira	Libanesa	Portuguese language
2011	Making The Boys	Herself	
2012	Meth Head	Pinkie	
2012	Groom's Cake	Candis	Short film
2014	Crazy Bitches	Vivianna	
2020	Disclosure: Trans Lives on Screen	Herself	Documentary film
2020	I Hate New Year's	Zelena / Marley	
2025	’’Witchy Ways’’	Penny	

=== Television ===
Year	Title	Role	Notes
2007	CSI: NY	Quentin Conrad	Episode "The Lying Game"
2008	Sordid Lives: The Series	Therapist #19	Episode "An Audacious Affair"
2007–08	Dirty Sexy Money	Carmelita Rainer	11 episodes
2009	Nip/Tuck	Alexis Stone	2 episodes
2010	Drop Dead Diva	Allison Webb	Episode "Queen of Mean"
2011	Necessary Roughness	Geraldine	Episode "Dream On"
2011	RuPaul's Drag U	Herself	Episode: "Naughty Nurses"
2012	She's Living for This	Herself	Episode "The Candis Cayne Episode"
2012–17	RuPaul's Drag Race	Herself	4 episodes
2013–14	Elementary	Ms. Hudson	3 episodes
2015–16	I Am Cait	Herself	15 episodes
2016	Heartbeat	Ava	Episode: "Permanent Glitter"
2017-2018	The Magicians	Fairy Queen	10 episodes
2017	Transparent	Jolene	Episode: “Born Again”
2018	Grey's Anatomy	Dr. Michelle Velez	2 episodes
2021	The Sherry Vine Show	Herself	Guest

=== Music videos ===
Year	Title	Performer	Notes
1997	"A Little Bit of Love"	RuPaul	Dancer
2017	"Faces"	Mila Jam	Cameo
2020	"Nerves of Steel"	Erasure	Cameo

== See also ==
- LGBT culture in New York City
- List of LGBT people from New York City
- NYC Pride March
