= Tanna Frederick =

American actress

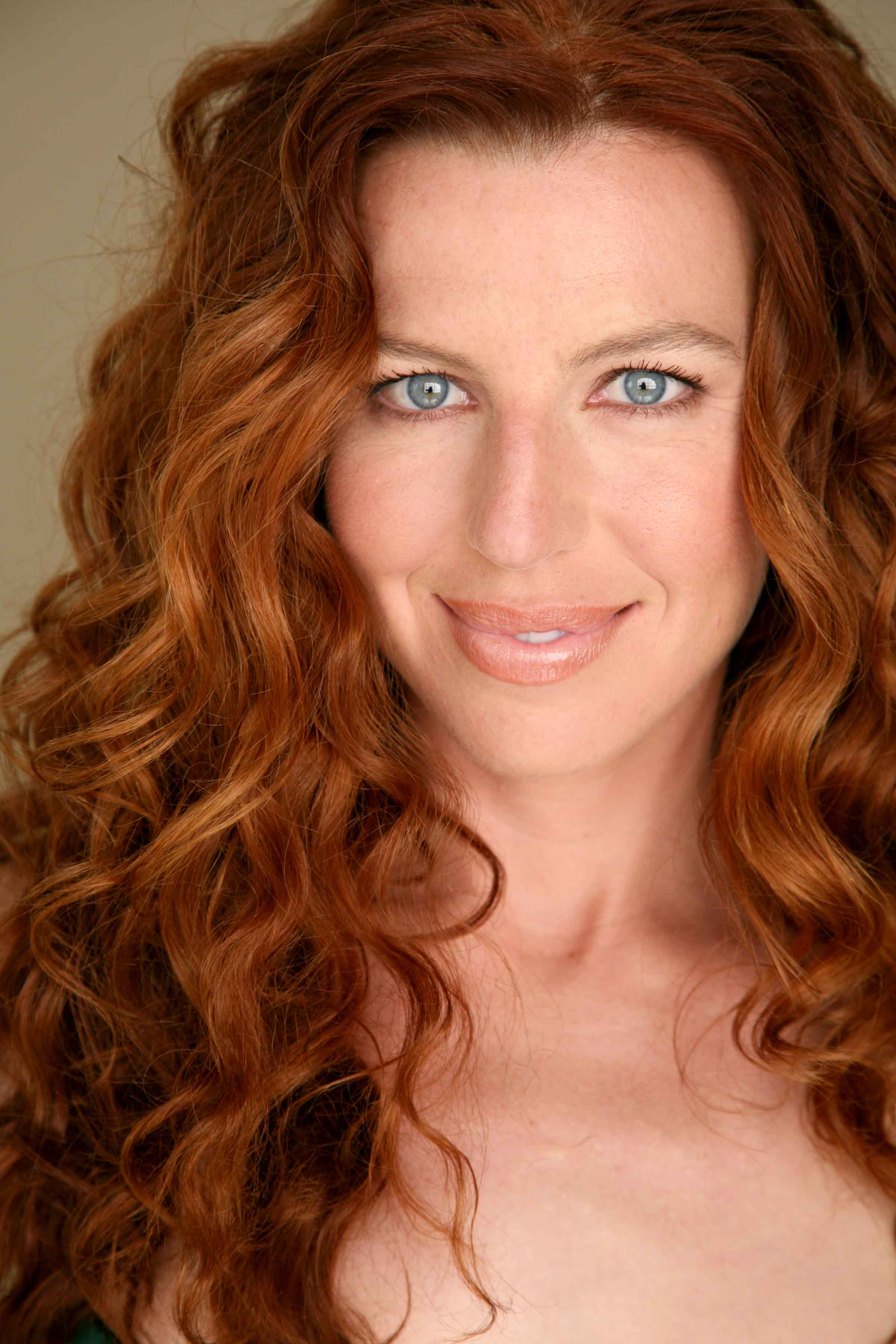
- Frederick in 2008
- Born: Tanna Marie Frederick; August 11, 1977 (age 49); Mason City, Iowa, U.S.
- Education: University of Iowa
- Occupation: Actress
- Years active: 2003–present

Tanna Marie Frederick (born August 11, 1977) is an American stage and independent film actress who rose to prominence for her title role in Henry Jaglom's Hollywood Dreams, for which she received the Best Actress Award at the 2008 Fargo Film Festival.

== Biography ==
Tanna Frederick was born in Mason City, Iowa.

=== Education ===
Frederick attended school in Mason City, and by fourth grade had begun to play in productions of that town's Stebens' Children's Theatre. Following her graduation from Mason City High School in 1995, Tanna Frederick attended college at the University of Iowa where she double majored in theater and political science. She was a regular on Iowa City stages appearing at the Riverside Theatre as "Jill" in Jack and Jill, and at the University Theatre in a one-woman play that she had written herself and titled Questioning Jabe.

Frederick graduated in 1999 as valedictorian of her University of Iowa liberal arts class, and shortly thereafter moved to Los Angeles to follow what the actress has termed her "Joan of Arc calling" which happened at the age of 7.

=== Career ===
After graduation, Tanna Frederick worked as an extra on Days of Our Lives. She acted in several stage productions, including N. Richard Nash's Echoes and Ben Guillory and Danny Glover's production of Toussaint: For the Love of Freedom. Between assignments, she did whatever was necessary to "pay the bills", including work as a waitress.

In 2002, dramatist Henry Jaglom gave Frederick his play A Safe Place for her acting class. Frederick found a theater company who would produce it. The play opened in September 2003 and ran for three months. That same year Frederick also received her first film assignment, in Helen Lesnick's Inescapable (released 2003).

According to Madeleine Shaner in Back Stage West, Frederick's success with A Safe Place inspired Jaglom to also adapt his 1985 screenplay Always (But Not Forever) to the stage. The play opened in October 2005 as Always... But Not Forever.

In Fall 2006, Frederick began work on Jaglom's Hollywood Dreams as Margie Chizek, a young woman who is desperate to break into the film business. The film debuted at the American Film Institute's November 2006 Festival and was theatrically released in May 2007. The New York Times observed that Hollywood Dreams was "driven by Ms. Frederick's no-boundaries commitment to her broken character", and that she gave "a performance that [was as] startling as it [was] touching".

In late 2006, Frederick helped found the Iowa Independent Film Festival.

Frederick starred in Danny and the Deep Blue Sea directed by Carl Weathers in 2017. She also produced and starred in Two Ways Home, which was endorsed by NAMI (National Alliance on Mental Health) for its storyline involving a character overcoming stigma associated with bi-polar disorder.

== Filmography ==
- 2003 Inescapable
- 2003 First Impressions
- 2006 Charles at the Threshold
- 2006 Hollywood Dreams
- 2007 Rising Shores
- 2009 Irene in Time
- 2010 Queen of the Lot
- 2010 Shrek Forever After - VO the Dragon
- 2011 Virtually Yours
- 2012 Just 45 Minutes from Broadway
- 2014 December. 17th
- 2014 The 'M' Word
- 2014 A Lasting Impression
- 2015 Ovation
- 2018 South of Hope Street
- 2019 Two Ways Home

== Stage ==
- 2003 A Safe Place
- 2007 Always — But Not Forever
- 2009/2010 Just 45 Minutes from Broadway
- 2011 Sylvia
- 2011 Jack and Jill
- 2012/2013 The Rainmaker
- 2014/2015 Train to Zakopane, The Dutchman
- 2018 Danny and the Deep Blue Sea

== Personal life ==
Tanna is a practitioner of Taekwondo having earned her 4th Dan Black Belt. Her marriage to Henry Jaglom was annulled in 2019.

== Bibliography ==
- Beck, Marilyn; Smith, Stacy Jenel (March 31, 2008), Wyle To Play Sleazy Celeb Reporter In 'Dreams' Sequel, Hollywood Exclusive (Syndicated Column), Creators Syndicate.
- Catsoulis, Jeannette (May 25, 2007), "Movie Memories and Gender Confusion", The New York Times, no. May 6, 2007, p. E3.
- Keefe, Terry (2007), "Tanna Frederick: Living her Hollywood Dream", Venice Magazine, no. May 2007, p. 12.
- Lawrence, Dianne (2008), "Tanna Frederick: Going The Distance", Film Monthly, vol. 9, no. 9.
- Meyer, John P. (June 12, 2007), "Hollywood Dreams ... and she can spin-kick, too!", Dallas/Fort Worth Pegasus News
- Shaner, Madeleine (2007), "Always... But Not Forever", Back Stage West, no. October 25–31, 2007, p. 18.
- Rushia, Stephanie (2007), "Tanna Frederick", Interview Magazine, no. Dec/Jan 2008, p. 44.
- Stasiewski, Daniel (March 10, 2008), "All About Tanna: An Interview with Tanna Frederick", TFC Journal.
- Wood, Jennifer (April 21, 2008), "Tanna Frederick Lives the Hollywood Dream", Movie Maker Magazine, archived from the original on May 16, 2008.
- Toto, Christian (July 14, 2009) WWTW Interview Tanna Frederick ("Irene in Time")
