= Sitting Ducks (film) =

1980 film

- Film/DVD promotional art
- Directed by: Henry Jaglom
- Written by: Henry Jaglom
- Produced by: Meira Attia Dor; Michael Jaglom
- Starring: Michael Emil
- Cinematography: Paul Glickman
- Distributed by: United Film Distribution Co.
- Release date: April 4, 1980
- Running time: 87 minutes
- Country: United States
- Language: English

Sitting Ducks is a 1980 American comedy film directed by Henry Jaglom. The film follows the adventures of two small-time hoods (Zack Norman and Michael Emil, Jaglom’s real-life brother) who steal a considerable amount of cash from a gambling syndicate. While fleeing by car down the U.S. eastern seaboard for a chartered airplane that will take them to Central America, they pick up a pair of vivacious young ladies and an unsuccessful singer-songwriter.

The film competed in the Un Certain Regard section at the 1980 Cannes Film Festival.

== Cast ==
- Michael Emil - Simon
- Zack Norman - Sidney
- Patrice Townsend - Jenny
- Irene Forrest - Leona
- Richard Romanus - Moose
- John Teranova - Mr. Carmichael
- Eric Starr - Gas Station Attendant
- Stasia Grabowski - Collector #1
- Ellen Talmadge - Collector #2
- Madeline Silver - Secretary (as Madeline N. Silver)
- Yoram Kaniur - Collector #3
- Judith Bruce - Head Waitress
