= Victoria Foyt =

American novelist

- Born: United States
- Occupations: Author; novelist; screenwriter; actress
- Spouse: Henry Jaglom (m. 1991; div. 2013)
- Website: victoriafoyt.com

Victoria Foyt is an American author, novelist, screenwriter and actor, best known for her books The Virtual Life of Lexie Diamond, Valentine to Faith and Save the Pearls: Revealing Eden. Foyt has written articles for magazines such as Harper's Bazaar, O at Home, and Film & Video.

== Biography ==
Foyt married Henry Jaglom in 1991 and divorced him in 2013. They met after Jaglom viewed a postcard promoting a play Foyt was performing in.

In 2012, Foyt founded the publishing company Sand Dollar Press.

== Film career ==
Foyt co-wrote and starred in four feature films, all of which were directed by Jaglom. The pair first worked together in 1994's Babyfever and filmed Déjà Vu in 1997, which was partially inspired by how Jaglom and Foyt met.

Foyt wrote and directed the short film The Sweet Spot, which starred Jennifer Grant and Carl Weathers. The Sweet Spot was shown in several film festivals, including PBS on Hollywood: Fine Cut, the Los Angeles International Short Film Festival, the Hawaii Film Festival, and the Newport Beach Film Festival. In 2005, she starred in Jaglom's Going Shopping.

== Save the Pearls criticism ==
Foyt received criticism for her self-published novel Save the Pearls: Revealing Eden, a dystopian novel in which people of African descent are the "ruling class". Some reviewers of an early excerpt described elements of the novel as racist, including the use of the term "coal". The science fiction and fantasy magazine Weird Tales announced that it would publish an excerpt from the novel in one of its first issues under new ownership, but after readers threatened a boycott, the planned publication was cancelled. Foyt responded to the criticism by stating that she had not intended the book's contents or advertising to be racist, and that her intention was to write a novel addressing the issue of global warming.

== Filmography ==
- Babyfever, 1994
- Last Summer in the Hamptons, 1995
- Déjà Vu, 1997
- Going Shopping, 2005
- The Sweet Spot (as writer and director)

== Bibliography ==
=== Novels ===
Valentine to Faith (2020)

The Virtual Life of Lexie Diamond (2007)

==== Save the Pearls ====
1. Revealing Eden (2012)
2. Adapting Eden (2013)
3. Freeing Eden (unreleased, no release date known)
