= Hollywood Dreams =

- Directed by: Henry Jaglom
- Written by: Henry Jaglom
- Produced by: Rosemary Marks; Rima Simon; Allison Wilke
- Starring: Tanna Frederick; Justin Kirk; David Proval; Melissa Leo; Karen Black; Eric Roberts; Sally Kirkland; Seymour Cassel
- Cinematography: Alan Caudillo
- Edited by: Henry Jaglom
- Music by: Harriet Schock
- Distributed by: Rainbow Releasing
- Release dates: April 8, 2006 (Ashland Independent Film Festival); May 18, 2007 (United States)
- Running time: 100 minutes
- Country: United States
- Language: English
- Box office: $171,255

Hollywood Dreams is a 2006 American comedy drama film written and directed by Henry Jaglom. The film stars Tanna Frederick, Justin Kirk, Melissa Leo, David Proval, Karen Black, Eric Roberts, and Seymour Cassel.

== Plot ==
Aspiring actress Margie Chizek (Frederick) seeks Hollywood stardom and finds rejection, romance, publicity and epiphanies along the way.

== Sequel ==
The film spawned a sequel released in 2010 titled Queen of the Lot.
