= Hanania Baer =

Israeli cinematographer

- חנניה ביר
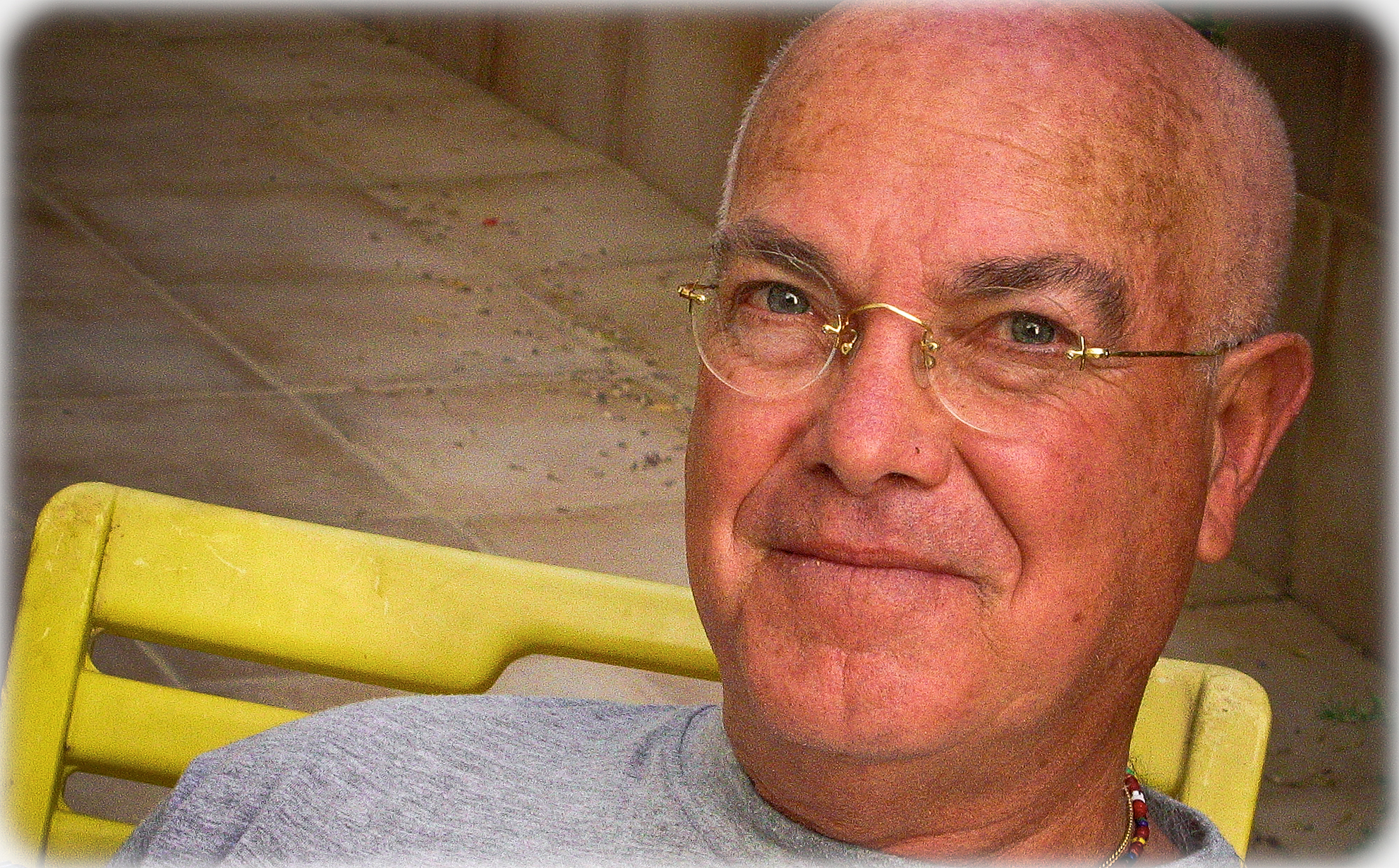
- Baer in 2009
- Born: 24 September 1943 (age 81); Israel
- Occupation: Cinematographer

Hanania Baer (Hebrew: חנניה ביר; born 24 September 1943) is a cinematographer who was born in Israel and works in the United States. He won a Daytime Emmy in 1984 for the ABC Afterschool Specials episode Andrea's Story: A Hitchhiking Tragedy.

== Selected filmography ==
- (1984) Breakin'
- (1984) Ninja III: The Domination
- (1984) Breakin' 2: Electric Boogaloo
- (1987) Masters of the Universe
- (1988) Elvira: Mistress of the Dark
- (1994) Babyfever
- (1994) Inner Sanctum 2
- (1997) Déjà Vu
- (2004) A Christmas Carol
- (2009) Irene in Time
- (2010) Queen of the Lot
- (2012) Just 45 Minutes from Broadway
- (2015) Ovation
