= Henry Jaglom =

English-American filmmaker (1938–2025)

- Born: Henry David Jaglom; January 26, 1938; London, England
- Died: September 22, 2025 (aged 87); Santa Monica, California, U.S.
- Education: University of Pennsylvania (BA)
- Occupations: Film director; playwright
- Spouses: Patrice Townsend (m. 1979; div. 1983) Victoria Foyt (m. 1991; div. 2013) Tanna Frederick (annulled)
- Children: 2

Henry David Jaglom (January 26, 1938 – September 22, 2025) was an American actor, film director and playwright. He began his career by training at the Actors Studio that saw him act, write, and direct off-Broadway theater before moving to Hollywood in the late 1960s. He did a number of appearances in film while aspiring to become a filmmaker that saw him make his feature debut as writer and director with A Safe Place (1971).

Described as an "idiosyncratic independent filmmaker" that aimed to make personal films (often involving women and relationships) that saw him direct for over four decades, ranging from Can She Bake a Cherry Pie? (1983) to his final film with Train to Zakopané (2017).

== Background ==
Jaglom was born to a Jewish family in London, England, on January 26, 1938, the son of Marie (née Stadthagen) and Simon M. Jaglom, who worked in the import-export business. His father was from a wealthy family from modern-day Ukraine and his mother was from Germany. They left for England because of the Nazi regime. Through his mother, he is a descendant of philosopher Moses Mendelssohn. Shortly after Henry's birth, the family moved to the United States and settled in Manhattan, New York City. He was educated at Columbia Grammar & Preparatory School and then the University of Pennsylvania, where he studied English and graduated in 1963.

== Career ==
Jaglom trained with Lee Strasberg at the Actors Studio in New York, where he acted, wrote and directed off-Broadway theater and cabaret before settling in Hollywood in the late 1960s. Under contract to Columbia Pictures, Jaglom featured in such TV series as Gidget and The Flying Nun and acted in a number of films which included Richard Rush's Psych-Out (1968), Boris Sagal's The Thousand Plane Raid (1969), Jack Nicholson's Drive, He Said (1971), Dennis Hopper's The Last Movie (1971), Maurice Dugowson's Lily, aime-moi (1975) and Orson Welles' The Other Side of the Wind (1970–1976; 2018).

=== Filmmaking ===
Jaglom's transition from acting in films to creating them was largely influenced by his experience watching Federico Fellini's film 8½ (1963), he told Robert K. Elder in an interview for The Film That Changed My Life.

The film changed my identity. I realized that what I wanted to do was make films. Not only that, but I realized what I wanted to make films about: my own life, to some extent.

Jaglom began his film-making career working with Jack Nicholson on the editing of Hopper's Easy Rider (1969), and made his writing/directing debut with A Safe Place (1971), starring Tuesday Weld, Nicholson, and Welles. His next film, Tracks (1976), starred Hopper and was one of the earliest movies to explore the psychological cost on America of the Vietnam War. His third film, the first to be a commercial success, was Sitting Ducks (1980), a comic romp that co-starred Zack Norman with Jaglom's brother Michael Emil. Film critic David Thomson said of Jaglom's next film, Can She Bake a Cherry Pie? (1983), starring Karen Black, that it "is an actors' film in that it grows out of their personalities—it is as loose and unexpected as life, but is shaped and witty as a great short story. In truth, a new kind of film."

Jaglom co-starred in four of his most personal films — Always (1985), Someone to Love (1987) starring Orson Welles in his final film performance, New Year's Day (1989), which introduced David Duchovny, and Venice/Venice (1992) opposite French star Nelly Alard.

In May 1988, Jaglom directed Eating (released 1990) about a group of women with eating disorders and how they cope with it and one another. Babyfever (1995) was about the issue of women with ticking biological clocks. Last Summer in the Hamptons (1996) was a Chekhovian look at the life of a theatrical family and starred Viveca Lindfors in her last screen role. Déjà Vu (1997) was about the yearning of people trying to find their perfect soul mate and was the only film in which Vanessa Redgrave and her mother, Rachel Kempson, appeared together. Festival in Cannes (2002) explored the lives and relationships of those involved in the world of film making and was shot entirely at the 1999 Cannes Film Festival. Going Shopping (2005) explored that subject as the third part of Jaglom's "Women's Trilogy", the others being Eating and Babyfever.

Hollywood Dreams (2007) dealt with a young woman's obsession with fame in the film industry and introduced Tanna Frederick, who then starred in Jaglom's Irene in Time (2009), a look at the complex relationships between fathers and daughters, and Queen of the Lot, the sequel-of-sorts to Hollywood Dreams that co-starred Noah Wyle as well as Christopher Rydell, Peter Bogdanovich, Jack Heller, Mary Crosby, Kathryn Crosby, and Dennis Christopher.

Jaglom's screen adaptation of Just 45 Minutes from Broadway, starring Frederick and Judd Nelson, was released in 2012. He edited The M Word, which stars Frederick, Frances Fisher, Michael Imperioli, Gregory Harrison, and Corey Feldman for a Fall 2013 theatrical release.

=== Other work ===
In 1983, Jaglom began taping lunch conversations with Orson Welles at Los Angeles's Ma Maison. Edited transcripts of these sessions, which continued until shortly before Welles died in 1985, appear in My Lunches With Orson: Conversations Between Henry Jaglom and Orson Welles, edited by Peter Biskind (2013).

Jaglom wrote four plays that have been performed on Los Angeles stages: The Waiting Room (1974), A Safe Place (2003), Always—But Not Forever (2007) and Just 45 Minutes from Broadway (2009/2010).

Jaglom is the subject of Henry-Alex Rubin and Jeremy Workman's documentary Who Is Henry Jaglom (1995). First presented at numerous film festivals, the documentary premiered on PBS's documentary series POV.

== Personal life and death ==
Jaglom was married three times. The first two marriages, to Patrice Townsend and Victoria Foyt, ended in divorce; his third marriage, to Tanna Frederick, was annulled. He had two children from his second marriage.

Jaglom died at his home in Santa Monica, California, on September 22, 2025, at the age of 87.

== Filmography as a director ==
- A Safe Place (1971)
- Tracks (1976)
- Sitting Ducks (1980)
- Can She Bake a Cherry Pie? (1983)
- Always (1985)
- Someone to Love (1987)
- New Year's Day (1989)
- Eating (1990)
- Venice/Venice (1992)
- Babyfever (1994)
- Last Summer in the Hamptons (1995)
- Déjà Vu (1997)
- Festival in Cannes (2001)
- Going Shopping (2005)
- Hollywood Dreams (2007)
- Irene in Time (2009)
- Queen of the Lot (2010)
- Just 45 Minutes from Broadway (2012)
- The M Word (2014)
- Ovation (2015)
- Train to Zakopané (2017)

== Filmography as an actor ==
- 1965 Gidget S1 E10 as Billy Roy Soames
- 1968 Psych-Out as Warren
- 1969 The Thousand Plane Raid as Worchek
- 1971 Drive, He Said as Conrad
- 1971 The Last Movie as The Minister's Son
- 1975 Lily, aime-moi as Guest At Flo's Party
- 1980 Sitting Ducks as Hit Man
- 1985 Always as David
- 1987 Someone to Love as Danny Sapir
- 1989 New Year's Day as Drew
- 1992 Venice/Venice as Dean
- 1996 Last Summer in the Hamptons as Max Berger

== Playwright ==
- 1974 The Waiting Room
- 2003 A Safe Place
- 2007 Always—But Not Forever
- 2009-2010 Just 45 Minutes from Broadway
- 2012-2013 The Rainmaker
- 2014-2015 Train to Zakopané
