= Night of the Demons (film series) =

American comedy-horror franchise

- Created by: Joe Augustyn
- Original work: Night of the Demons (1988)
- Owners: International Film Marketing; Paramount Pictures; Republic Pictures; Blue Rider Productions; Seven Arts International
- Years: 1988–2009

Films and television
- Film(s): Night of the Demons (1988); Night of the Demons 2 (1994); Night of the Demons 3 (1997); Night of the Demons (2009)

Night of the Demons is an American comedy-horror franchise consisting of four films. The original film, Night of the Demons, was released in 1988. Written and produced by Joe Augustyn, and directed by Kevin S. Tenney, the sequels have had various writers and directors attached to them, with the character of Angela Franklin remaining the only constant in all of the films in the franchise. Tenney, who directed the first sequel, also wrote the third film in the franchise and co-produced the remake.

== Films ==
Film	U.S. release date	Director(s)	Screenwriter(s)	Producer(s)
Original series
Night of the Demons	October 14, 1988	Kevin S. Tenney	Joe Augustyn	Joe Augustyn
Night of the Demons 2	May 13, 1994	Brian Trenchard-Smith	Joe Augustyn & James Penzi	Jeff Geoffray
Night of the Demons 3	October 7, 1997	Jim Kaufman	Kevin S. Tenney	Claudio Castravelli
Remake
Night of the Demons	August 30, 2009	Adam Gierasch	Adam Gierasch & Jace Anderson	Greg McKay, Kevin S. Tenney, and Michael Arata

=== Night of the Demons (1988) ===
The first film in the series, Night of the Demons was released in 1988. The film was written and produced by Joe Augustyn and directed by Kevin S. Tenney. The film follows several teenagers as they attend a party thrown by school outcast Angela (played by Amelia Kinkade) and her best friend (scream queen Linnea Quigley) at an abandoned funeral home.

The film was picked up for theatrical release by Paragon Arts International. Rather than a nationwide release, it was released regionally, debuting in Detroit, Michigan, on September 9, 1988.

=== Night of the Demons 2 (1994) ===
Night of the Demons 2 was released in 1994, with the story picking up six years after the end of the previous film. The story follows the character of Angela's younger sister Melissa as she and several of her fellow students visit Hull House on Halloween. Unlike its predecessor, which took place entirely inside of the funeral parlor, the sequel has demonic activity occurring outside of the limits of the property on the school's campus.

The film was given a limited theatrical release in California by Republic Pictures from May 17, 1994.

=== Night of the Demons 3 (1997) ===
Night of the Demons 3 (also known as Demon House) is a 1997 sequel to the previous two films. Written by Kevin S. Tenney, the plot features several teens that find themselves on the run after a misunderstanding leading to a shoot out with police. They try to hide out at Hull House.

The film was given a limited theatrical release in California by Republic Pictures from October 7, 1997.

=== Night of the Demons (2009) ===
Night of the Demons is a 2009 remake that was loosely based on the original 1988 film. The film takes place in a seemingly haunted mansion in New Orleans, with the plot following several adults rather than teenagers. It was directed by Adam Gierasch and produced by Kevin S. Tenney.

The film originally premiered at the London FrightFest in August 2009. Although it was originally scheduled to arrive in theaters, it was instead released straight-to-DVD/Blu-ray on October 19, 2010.

=== Future ===
==== Night of the Demons: After-Party (TBA) ====
In June 2013, Kevin S. Tenney intended to create a sequel to the 2009 Night of the Demons film, subtitled "After-Party" and directed by Anthony Hickox. A Kickstarter campaign was launched with a goal of $250,000 but was unsuccessful, with the project remaining in development hell since 2013.

The projected plot for After-Party was to center on the character of Diana, one of Angela's former friends and associates, who would hold a party in the same mansion and become possessed by the now-demonic Angela.

== Cast and characters ==
List indicators
- A dark gray cell indicates that the character was not in the film or that the character's presence in the film has yet to be announced.
- An ^{A} indicates an appearance through archival footage or stills.
- A ^{C} indicates a cameo role.
- An ^{S} indicates a role shared with another actor.
- A ^{U} indicates an uncredited role.
- A ^{V} indicates a voice-only role.

Character	Original series			Remake
Character	Night of the Demons	Night of the Demons 2	Night of the Demons 3	Night of the Demons
Character	1988	1994	1997	2009
Angela Franklin / Feld	Amelia Kinkade James W. Quinn^{V}	Amelia Kinkade	Amelia Kinkade	Shannon Elizabeth
Suzanne Reed / Ballerina	Linnea Quigley			Bobbi Sue Luther Linnea Quigley^{C}
Diana				Tiffany Shepis
Judy Cassidy	Cathy Podewell			
Sal Romero	William Gallo			
Rodger	Alvin Alexis			
Jay Jansen	Lance Fenton			
"Stooge"	Hal Havins			
Helen	Allison Barron			
Max	Philip Tanzini			
Frannie	Jill Terashita			
Old Man	Harold Ayer			
Old Woman	Marie Denn			
Judy's Mother	Karen Ericson			
Billy	Donnie Jeffcoat, Jr.			
Clerk #1	Cathy Podewell			
Clerk #2	Clark Jarrett			
Bibi		Cristi Harris		
"Z-Boy"		Darin Heames		
Perry		Robert Jayne		
Melissa "Mouse" Franklin		Merle Kennedy		
Father Bob		Rod McCary		
Johnny Moran		Himself		
Rick Peters		Himself		
Sister Gloria		Jennifer Rhodes		
Terri		Christine Taylor		
Shirley Finnerty		Zoe Trilling		
Kurt		Ladd York		
Albert		Mark Neely		
Linda		Rachel Longaker		
Officer Larry Day			Himself	
Vince			Kristen Holden-Ried	
Nick			Gregory Calpakis	
Lois			Tara Slone	
Orson			Christian Tessier	
Reggie			Joel Gordon	
Abbie			Patricia Rodriguez	
Holly			Stephanie Bauder	
Mr. Morris			Ian McDonald	
Quicky Mart Clerk			Ian McDonald	
Officer Tony / Rookie Cop			Richard Jutras	
Veteran Cop			Minor Mustain	
Lieutenant Dewhurst			Vlasta Vrána	
Macho Cop			Richard Zeman	
Maddie Curtis				Monica Keena
Lily Thompson				Diora Baird
Dex Thrilby				Michael Copon
Jason Rogers				John F. Beach
Colin Levy				Edward Furlong
Nigel				Jamie Harris

== Reception ==
=== Box office ===
Film	Release date (US)	Budget	Format	Box office revenue			Reference
Film	Release date (US)	Budget	Format	United States	International	Worldwide	Reference
Night of the Demons	October 14, 1988	$1,200,000	Theatrical release	$3,109,904			
Night of the Demons 2	May 13, 1994	$1,300,000	Direct-to-video				
Night of the Demons 3	October 7, 1997	$5,765,562	Direct-to-video				
Night of the Demons	August 30, 2009	$10,000,000	Limited release	$64,040			

== See also ==
- List of films set around Halloween
