= Night of the Demon (disambiguation) =

Night of the Demon is a 1957 horror film.

Night of the Demon(s) may also refer to:

- The Touch of Satan, a 1971 horror film re-released as Night of the Demon
- Night of the Demon (1980 film), a Bigfoot-themed horror film
- Night of the Demons (film series), an American horror-film franchise consisting of:
  - Night of the Demons (1988 film)
  - Night of the Demons 2 (1994 film)
  - Night of the Demons 3, a.k.a. Demon House (1997 film)
  - Night of the Demons (2009 film), a remake of the 1988 film
- Night of the Demon, an album by Demon
- Night of the Demon, a live album by Gazpacho
