= List of films about demons =

This is a list of films where demons appear.

== Demons ==
- 976-EVIL
- A Christmas Horror Story
- Alias Nick Beal
- The Alchemist Cookbook
- Alucarda
- Amityville II: The Possession
- Angel on My Shoulder
- Annabelle
- Annabelle Comes Home
- Annabelle: Creation
- Army of Darkness
- Antrum
- At the Devil's Door (aka Home)
- Ava's Possessions
- The Babadook
- Bedazzled (1967)
- Bedazzled (2000)
- Bedeviled
- Bill & Ted's Bogus Journey
- The Blackcoat's Daughter
- The Blood on Satan's Claw
- Bloody Mallory
- Cellar Dweller
- Children of the Corn
- A Chinese Ghost Story
- The Chosen
- The Church
- The Conjuring Universe
- The Conjuring
- The Conjuring 2
- Constantine
- Countdown
- Credo
- The Crucifixion
- Cry of the Banshee
- The Curse of Sleeping Beauty
- Dead Before Dawn
- The Demon's Rook
- Damn Yankees
- Dark Angel: The Ascent
- Dark Waters
- The Day of the Beast
- Deathgasm
- Demon Hunter
- Demon Knight
- Demons
- Demons 2
- The Demons of Ludlow
- Demon House
- Drag Me to Hell
- Devil in My Ride
- The Devil Conspiracy
- The Devil Inside
- The Devil's Advocate
- The Devil's Carnival
- The Devil's Carnival: Alleluia!
- The Devil's Nightmare
- The Devil's Rock
- Dante's Inferno (1924)
- Dante's Inferno: An Animated Epic
- Demon Slayer: Kimetsu no Yaiba the Movie: Mugen Train
- The Devil and Daniel Webster
- The Devil and Max Devlin
- Devil's Den
- Doctor Strange
- Dogma
- Dominion: Prequel to the Exorcist
- Don't Kill It
- Doom
- Doom: Annihilation
- Drive Angry
- End of Days
- End of the Line
- Equinox
- The Evil
- The Evil Dead
- Evil Dead
- Evil Dead 2
- Evilspeak
- The Evil Within
- The Exorcist
- The Exorcist: Italian Style
- Exorcist II: The Heretic
- The Exorcist III
- Exorcist: The Beginning
- Fallen
- Fantasia
- Farm House
- Faust
- Faust: Love of the Damned
- Flesh for the Beast
- Forever Evil
- Frailty
- The Frighteners
- Funny Man
- The Gate
- Geometria
- Ghost Rider
- Ghost Rider: Spirit of Vengeance
- Gods of Egypt
- The Golden Child
- Hell and Back
- Hell Baby
- Hell's Highway
- Hellbenders
- Hellbound
- Hellboy (2004)
- Hellboy (2019)
- Hellboy II: The Golden Army
- Hellboy: Blood and Iron
- Hellboy: Sword of Storms
- Hellraiser
- Hellbound: Hellraiser II
- Hellraiser III: Hell on Earth
- Hellraiser: Bloodline
- Hellraiser: Inferno
- Hellraiser: Hellseeker
- Hellraiser: Deader
- Hellraiser: Hellworld
- Hellraiser: Revelations
- Hellraiser: Judgment
- Hereditary
- The Heretics
- Highway to Hell
- Horns
- Host
- House on Willow Street
- The House with a Clock in Its Walls
- Hulk: Where Monsters Dwell
- I, Frankenstein
- Idle Hands
- Inner Demons
- Incarnate
- Insidious
- It (2017)
- It Chapter Two (2019)
- Jack-O
- Jack O'Lantern
- Jeepers Creepers
- Jeepers Creepers 2
- Jeepers Creepers 3
- Jennifer's Body
- JeruZalem
- Joey
- Justice League Dark
- Justice League Dark: Apokolips War
- Justice League: The Flashpoint Paradox
- The Keep
- King Arthur: Legend of the Sword
- Knights of Badassdom
- KPop Demon Hunters
- Krampus
- Krampus: The Devil Returns
- Krampus: The Reckoning
- Krampus Unleashed
- Kuwaresma
- The Last Exorcism
- Legend
- Lights Out
- Little Evil
- Little Nicky
- Lo
- Manborg
- Mara
- Mausoleum
- Mercy
- The Minion
- Mirrors
- Mortal Kombat Legends: Scorpion's Revenge
- My Demon Lover
- Ne Zha
- Needful Things
- Nekrotronic
- Nightbreed
- Night of the Demon (1957)
- Night of the Demons (1988)
- Night of the Demons (2009)
- Night of the Demons 2
- Night of the Demons 3
- The New Mutants
- The Nun
- The Omen (1976)
- The Omen (2006)
- Damien: Omen II
- Omen III: The Final Conflict
- Omen IV: The Awakening
- Paranormal Activity
- Paranormal Activity 2
- Paranormal Activity 3
- Paranormal Activity 4
- Paranormal Activity: The Marked Ones
- Paranormal Activity 2: Tokyo Night
- Pari
- The Possessed
- The Possession
- The Possession of Hannah Grace
- The Possession of Michael King
- The Princess and the Frog
- The Prophecy
- Princess Mononoke
- Pumpkinhead
- Pumpkinhead II: Blood Wings
- Pumpkinhead: Ashes to Ashes
- Pumpkinhead: Blood Feud
- Pyewacket
- The Queen of Spades (1916)
- The Queen of Spades (1949)
- Rec
- Rec 2
- Rec 3: Genesis
- REC 4: Apocalypse
- Rosemary's Baby
- Satan's Slave
- Satanic Panic
- Season of the Witch
- Seklusyon
- The Sentinel (1977)
- The Seventh Curse
- Semum
- Seventh Moon
- Shazam!
- Shortcut to Happiness
- Sinister
- Sinister 2
- Siren
- Slayers - The Motion Picture
- Someone Behind You
- Sometimes They Come Back Again
- The Soul of a Monster (1944)
- South Park: Bigger, Longer & Uncut (1999)
- Space Jam: A New Legacy
- Spawn
- Stephen King's The Stand
- The Student of Prague (1913)
- The Student of Prague (1926)
- The Student of Prague (1935)
- Tales of Halloween
- Teen Titans Go! vs. Teen Titans
- Teenage Exorcist
- Terror Toons
- This Is the End
- Thor: Ragnarok
- TMNT
- Truth or Dare (2018)
- Ultramarines: A Warhammer 40,000 Movie
- The Unholy
- The Unnamable
- V/H/S
- Violent Shit
- The Wailing
- What Dreams May Come
- Where the Dead Go to Die
- Wicked City
- The Wind
- The Witch

== See also ==
- List of films about angels
- List of films about witchcraft
