= Night of the Demons 3 =

1997 Canadian horror film directed by Jim Kaufman

- Theatrical release poster
- Directed by: Jimmy Kaufman
- Written by: Kevin Tenney
- Produced by: Claudio Castravelli
- Starring: Amelia Kinkade; Larry Day; Kris Holden-Ried; Tara Slone; Gregory Calpakis; Patricia Rodriguez; Stephanie Bauder
- Cinematography: Walter Bal
- Edited by: Daniel Duncan; Kevin Tenney
- Music by: Raymond C. Fabi; Dennis Michael Tenney
- Production company: Flanders Productions
- Distributed by: Republic Pictures
- Release date: October 7, 1997
- Running time: 88 minutes
- Country: Canada
- Language: English

Night of the Demons 3 is a 1997 American comedy horror film directed by Jimmy Kaufman and starring Amelia Kinkade, Vlasta Vrána, Gregory Calpakis, Tara Slone, Christian Tessier, Joel Gordon, Larry Day, Kris Holden-Reid, Stephanie Bauder, and Patricia Rodriguez. It is the third and final film in the Night of the Demons series before the 2009 remake, and follows a group of teenagers who are pursued by the demon-possessed Angela Franklin while hiding out in Hull House on Halloween night.

== Plot ==
Several years have passed after the massacre at St. Rita's Academy and on Halloween night, officer Larry is on night watch at Hull House, where he is confronted and murdered by Angela with his own police badge.

Sociopath teenager Vince, his promiscuous girlfriend Lois, and their friends Nick and Reggie are cruising through town in Vince's sidekick Orson's van. They stop to pick up head cheerleader Holly and her shy friend Abbie, who broke down on their way to the school dance, on the side of the road. Holly remembers Nick from algebra class on the first day of school, and Nick speculates Holly likes him.

While stopped at a convenience store, Reggie tries to buy beer with his brother's fake ID, but the unfriendly clerk pulls out a shotgun. Tempers flare, and Vince steals the gun just as two police officers enter the store. One of the officers is accidentally shot when the clerk grabs Vince, and the other shoots Reggie in the stomach twice. A fight between the officer and Vince breaks out, destroying the store. The teenagers and a wounded Reggie pile into the van, Vince brings the shotgun, Orson steals the police officer's gun, and they drive away. Fortunately, the officer they shot is wearing a bulletproof vest and is not harmed. Lieutenant Dewhurst, who is due to retire at midnight that night, watches the security camera playback of what happened, and deduces that the clerk's story of a robbery is a cover for stealing the money from the cash register, and that the kids are frightened teens, rather than vicious cop killers.

In the van, Vince notices that the gas tank is almost empty, and they decide to hide out at Hull House. Abbie tells Vince that the place is possessed and not to cross over the underground stream, since demons cannot cross over running water, but Vince forces them all to enter at gunpoint. Vince, trying to prove demons do not exist, taunts them and shoots a hole in the wall, causing the evil spirit that possesses the house to rush upstairs from the basement crematorium in the guise of Angela. Orson decides to stand up for himself and reveal that he has the police officer's pistol, and tells Vince that he will watch the others and Angela while Nick, Lois, and Vince make sure no one else is in the house.

Angela puts on some music and does an erotic dance to distract Orson, and Abbie and Holly see this as an opportunity to escape with Reggie. Holly tries hot wiring the van, but remembers that Nick is still inside. Angela begins to seduce Orson, simulating fellatio by sucking the bullets out of the gun through the barrel. Then she kisses Orson and her long, demon tongue shoots through the back of his head, killing him. Meanwhile, upstairs, Nick sneaks up on Vince and Lois who are making out, but fails to take the shotgun, and Vince fires the gun at Nick but misses. Outside, Holly hears the shot, and then overhears a voice over Larry's police radio and finds his car. Abbie leaves Reggie in the van to look for Holly, but Angela takes Abbie to a small chapel and plays on her insecurities and says she can make her an irresistible woman, and the demonic Angela kisses her and possesses her as well.

The badly wounded Reggie hears his name called, and leaves the van, only to be run over by the now possessed Orson. Abbie, who has been turned into a demonic version of her cat costume, seduces Vince until he hears the van crash. Lois, who is angry at Abbie because she thinks that she is now the perfect woman to fall in love with Vince, is scratched by Abbie after slapping her, then is pursued by Angela, who causes her hand to transform into a snake head which bites her. Holly smashes the police car window to call the police, but is attacked by Officer Larry. He chases Holly across the courtyard when she steps over the underground stream; Larry tries to step over it and is disintegrated. Nick finds Holly going back into the house to get everyone out. After encountering Orson, they hide in the attic and share a kiss. Orson appears, and Holly throws a can of lye in his face. They rush down to the hall when Dewhurst appears and he explains that he wants to help, then handcuffs them and takes them outside. Vince runs outside using Angela as a hostage. Dewhurst tells Vince that the officer he shot did not die, but Angela convinces Vince that Dewhurst is lying. Vince opens fire, but is shot through the eye and killed, and Angela returns to her demon form. The other demons appear, and Angela offers to let Dewhurst and Nick go free if Holly will willingly give up her pure and powerful soul. Holly agrees, and Angela turns Vince into a demon. The other demons make their way inside to Hell.

Dewhurst creates a diversion, and stabs Angela with Nick's switchblade. Nick gets in the police car and rams Angela against a tree. As dawn breaks, Angela disappears inside the house. As the three make their way to the gate, Dewhurst tells Nick and Holly that they were not on the security camera at the store and no one will ever know they were there. Angela reappears just as they're about to escape and pulls Dewhurst's heart from his chest. She chases Holly and Nick and just before they cross the underground stream, Angela grabs Holly's arm. Nick ends up pulling Holly and Angela both over the stream and Angela dissolves. Holly leaves a cross made of sticks at the gate and promises she'll be back every Halloween to make sure no one ever goes inside again. Holly and Nick then walk home and the last shot of the house shows the lights turning on and Angela laughing and saying "Happy Halloween".

== Cast ==
- Larry Day as Officer Larry
- Amelia Kinkade as Angela Franklin
- Kris Holden-Ried as Vince
- Gregory Calpakis as Nick
- Tara Slone as Lois
- Christian Tessier as Orson
- Joel Gordon as Reggie
- Patricia Rodriguez as Abbie
- Stephanie Bauder as Holly
- Ian McDonald as Mr. Morris, Quicky Mart Clerk
- Richard Jutras as Officer Tony, Rookie Cop
- Minor Mustain as Veteran Cop
- Vlasta Vrána as Lieutenant Dewhurst
- Richard Zeman as Macho Cop

== Production ==
In a December 2002 interview, writer Kevin Tenney, who also directed the first film, said that the script for the film was the best out of the three, but due to bad decisions made on set, many of the screenplay's best scenes ended up on the editing room floor, in an attempt to fix things that had gone awry during production.

== Reception ==
Critical reception for Night of the Demons 3 was mostly negative, with JoBlo.com stating the film was "too routine, uninspired, badly shot and cheap to deliver as a satisfying Night of the Demons sequel". Deseret News also panned the film, writing it was "another sequel to a horror movie no one liked the first time around".

== See also ==
- List of films set around Halloween
- Demon House
