= Seven Arts Pictures =

British film production company

- Formerly: Peter Hoffman Productions (1992-1997)
- Company type: Public company
- Traded as: OTC Pink Current: SAPX
- Industry: Filmmaking
- Founded: 1992
- Founder: Peter Hoffman
- Defunct: 2016
- Fate: Liquidated
- Headquarters: London, United Kingdom
- Area served: Worldwide
- Key people: Hubert Gibbs (chairman of the board); Peter Hoffman (CEO); Michael Garstin (President); Kate Hoffman (COO); Elaine New (Finance Director)
- Services: Film Making
- Divisions: Seven Arts International
- Website: www.7artspictures.com

Seven Arts Entertainment Inc. was a British independent film production company founded in 1992. Notable films that were made by Seven Arts were Stander, Johnny Mnemonic, Asylum, Noise, Rules of Engagement, No Good Deed, and Night of the Demons.

== History ==
Seven Arts Pictures was founded in the early 1990s by former Carolco president and CEO Peter Hoffman as Peter Hoffman Productions. In 1996, the studio came with a first look deal at Paramount Pictures. Hoffman runs a separate production company Cine Visions, which had been merged with ICE in 1997. Carolco had previously used the name Seven Arts as a joint venture with New Line Cinema to produce and release mid-budget films; when the partnership was dissolved, Hoffman took the name Seven Arts with him to start over. With offices in London, England and Los Angeles, California, Seven Arts is producing motion pictures worldwide with budgets ranking from $2 million to $15 million for exhibition in domestic (i.e., the United States and Canada) and foreign theatrical markets and for subsequent post-theatrical worldwide release in other forms of media, including Blu-ray and DVD, home video, pay-per-view, and free television. Mario Kassar had headed Carolco with Hoffman.

At one point, in the late 1990s, it was co-owned by CanWest Global Communications, who co-owned it with Peter and Susan Hoffman, with Canwest handling 35% of its share, and the Seven Arts International subsidiary, which was later absorbed into Fireworks Pictures (which would collaborate for production of An American Rhapsody in 2001). In 1998, it was in negotiations with Rysher Entertainment to handle international rights to the project Onegin, with several deals across all territories.. In 2002, the Seven Arts International label was rejigged, which handled international sales of the films.

In 2004, Seven Arts Pictures plc became a listed company on Alternative Investment Market (AIM). After trading on AIM for 3 years, the company moved to Plus Markets from 2007 to 2009. In preparation to its entrance on the Nasdaq, Seven Arts Pictures plc was listed on the OTCBB from 2008 to 2009. Since 2009, Seven Arts Pictures plc has been trading on the Nasdaq under SAPX.

Seven Arts Pictures also has trading entities in the UK which have been put into liquidation owing investors millions of dollars.

Below are a list of recent UK companies; most are in liquidation and are fronted by his daughter, Kate Hoffman:

- Seven Arts Filmed Entertainment UK Ltd
- Seven Arts Filmed Entertainment Ltd
- Seven Arts Pictures plc – In liquidation
- Cinematic Finance Ltd – In liquidation
- Knife Edge Films Ltd – In liquidation
- Gone To Hell Ltd – In liquidation

Seven Arts had been implicated in major fraud by HM Revenue and Customs and also by many investors, claiming that Peter Hoffman's daughter is behind the many scams in the UK.

In 2012, Seven Arts Pictures announced the creation of its new music division, Seven Arts Entertainment. This included the acquisition of musical assets by several multi platinum recording artists. Most notably is the rapper DMX whose next album was released in September 2012 titled Undisputed. The new music division of Seven Arts plans to sign deals with already established artists as well as up and coming artists.

The production slate of Seven Arts Pictures and third party producers are distributed through Seven Arts International.

== Filmography ==
- Johnny Mnemonic (1995)
- Shattered Image (1998)
- Rules of Engagement (2000)
- An American Rhapsody (2001)
- No Good Deed (2002)
- I'll Sleep When I'm Dead (2003)
- Stander (2004)
- Asylum (2005)
- Shooting Gallery (2006)
- Noise (2007)
- Autopsy (2008)
- Deal (2008)
- Knife Edge (2009)
- Night of the Demons (2009)
- Nine Miles Down (2010)
- The Pool Boys (2011)

== Founders controversy ==
Michael Arata and Peter Hoffman were accused of conspiracy, wire fraud in New Orleans 7 February 2014. Investigators said Arata and Hoffman sought tax credits for money they fraudulently claimed had been spent on the property. In April 2015, Hoffman was tried in a New Orleans court and found guilty of fraudulently claiming $1.13 million in state tax credits from the Louisiana state government for purchases of equipment and renovation work on an old mansion in the French Quarter, neither of which actually happened.
