= James Penzi =

American poet and playwright (born 1952)

James Penzi (born July 17, 1952) is an American poet and playwright. His poems have been published in numerous small press periodicals and literary journals, including Mundus Artium (Univ. of Texas), kayak, Montana Gothic, Caligula Press (England), and Contact II. His books include Salt Fever (1976), Scene/s in Bk & Wht (1982) and C(AIR)NS (1984), poems that were set to music by composer Glenn Branca. His last manuscript, Runes (1986), was never published.

His plays revolved around the theme of disconnectedness. The Gentlemen of Fifth Avenue (1983) was about the hermetic, interdependent Collyer brothers who were found in their Fifth Avenue mansion dead among 140 tons of debris; it was accepted by the Philadelphia Drama Guild for its Playwrights of Philadelphia (POP) Festival. It was also one of three plays selected for the Old Globe of San Diego's Best New Plays Festival, a national competition. His second full-length play, Doesn’t The Sky Look Green Today? (1985), a play about a doomed ménage à trois, was a semi-finalist in the FDG/CBS new plays competition.

He received story credit for a horror film, Night of the Demons 2 – a cult classic series created by screenwriter Joe Augustyn, with whom he also collaborated on another script, Beautiful Dreamer.

== Selected bibliography ==
- Dream on the eyelids of the moon (c. 197?)
- Salt Fever: poems (1976) ISBN 0-913386-08-1
- Scene/s in Bk & Wht (1982)
- Cairns (1984)
- Runes (c. 1982) (unpublished - manuscript can be found in the archives of the Sun & Moon Press, the Charles Bernstein, and/or Susan Howe papers at the University of San Diego)
