= Battlestar Galactica: The Resistance =

Television program

- Written by: David Weddle; Bradley Thompson
- Directed by: Wayne Rose
- Starring: Michael Hogan; Aaron Douglas; Nicki Clyne; Christian Tessier; Dominic Zamprogna
- Country of origin: United States
- Original language: English
- No. of episodes: 10 (list of episodes)

Production
- Executive producers: Ronald D. Moore; David Eick
- Running time: 2–5 minutes

Original release
- Network: Sci Fi Channel
- Release: September 5 – October 5, 2006

Related
- "Lay Down Your Burdens"; "Occupation"

Battlestar Galactica: The Resistance is the collective title of 10 two- to five-minute "webisodes" (also known as a web series) released exclusively on the World Wide Web through the Sci Fi Channel's website. The serial storyline follows events that occur between the close of season 2 and the beginning of season 3 of the re-imagined Battlestar Galactica TV series.

== Production ==
The webisodes were tailor-made for handheld screens, with actors shot close up and captions using extra-large type. Each clip reportedly cost $12,000 to produce.

The original title of this series was to be Battlestar Galactica: Crossroads but "Crossroads" was later used as the title of the third-season finale instead.

== Distribution ==
The first webisode was released on September 5, 2006, with two subsequent webisodes posted to the site each week through October 5 to lead into the season 3 premiere. The first two webisodes had a record-breaking 1.2 million streams over 7 days.

The series was produced as a promotional event to promote Battlestar Galactica, and as such generates no residuals for its writers. The WGA has called for the boycott of all un-residualed webisodes by writers and producers (though the WGA does not represent producers) from working on them.

The webisodes are only available for viewers from the United States, to the dismay of many fans worldwide; the decision to restrict the webisodes to the US has forced international fans to use peer-to-peer networks to get content which is supposedly free. The webisodes were later reposted on various free video hosting sites, such as YouTube but have since been removed at "the request of copyright owner NBC Universal because its content was used without permission". In late 2006, with Australia's Network Ten broadcasting of the third season of Battlestar Galactica on Ten HD, The Resistance webisodes were made available to the Australian public (Region 4) on the network's website but have since been taken down.

The webisodes were released on disc 2 of the Region 1 season three DVD set, with the option to play each episode individually or all together with title cards separating the chapters. The webisodes were included in the Region 2 set (since 2014 edition) and in the Region 4 DVD set (Season 4, Part 1), and are present on all Blu-ray versions.

== Plot ==
The series documents the events on planet New Caprica after the invasion by the Cylons at the end of the second season. It shows the activities of the resistance to Cylon occupation, and collaborators for the Cylons.

The resistance is headed by Colonel Saul Tigh, formerly XO of Galactica, and highest-ranking military officer on New Caprica. He is joined by new parents Chief Tyrol and Specialist Cally, former Galactica crewman Jammer, and Caprica resistance fighter Jean Barolay.

The series begins on the 67th day of Cylon occupation. It is learned that among the Cylons' first acts of occupation was the building of a detention center. The Cylons have also started recruiting for a human New Caprica Police (NCP) force. Former Galactica pilot Duck, whom Jammer has been courting for the resistance, condemns the NCP as collaborators but is reluctant to get involved with Tigh's group because he is newly married. As the series progresses, Duck's wife Nora is killed in a Cylon attack on a temple where Tigh and his team were storing weapons.

Although the tragedy kills 10 people, Tigh sees the opportunity to win support over to the resistance. Jammer is torn about the event, since he believed storing weapons in a temple was a sin. He is taken to a private meeting with a Number Five / Aaron Doral Cylon, where he is asked to support the Cylons' plan for peace, by reporting on any more resistance movement.

Afterwards, Jammer is given a chip (to report Resistance activity) and along with other resistance operatives, attends the baptismal of Nicholas Tyrol. Colonel Tigh has started plans to manufacture explosives near a hospital due to increased size of the resistance. It is discovered that in an act of revenge, Duck has joined the New Caprica Police as a spy for the resistance. Meanwhile, it is assumed that Jammer has become a Cylon collaborator – both men, ironically, becoming the very things they resisted earlier.

== Webisodes ==
Bradley Thompson, who co-wrote the webisodes, explained in a post on Scifi.com that the webisodes were not created as 10 individual standalone-stories, but were written as one truncated episode (~26 minutes long as opposed to the normal 40 minute run-time), filmed, and then cut into 10 segments. As such, the entire "webisode series" is one "story" and individual webisodes are not necessarily viewable on their own or out of sequence.

Title	Release date
Webisode 1	September 5, 2006
It is the 67th day of the occupation of New Caprica. Tyrol and Tigh have organized a resistance movement, but recruiting new soldiers and storing weapons is becoming dangerous and difficult. Meanwhile, Jammer, Duck and his wife Nora discuss the Cylon-run and human-staffed New Caprica Police.
Webisode 2	September 7, 2006
Duck upsets Tyrol by rejecting an offer to join the resistance due to his focus on starting a family. Later, Jean Barolay and Tigh agree to hide weapons in the city's temple, a move that disturbs Jammer.
Webisode 3	September 12, 2006
While the resistance secretly hides weapons inside the temple, Nora asks the gods for a child and is pleased when Duck tells her of his rejection of Tyrol's offer to join the resistance.
Webisode 4	September 14, 2006
Cally and Nora are visiting the temple when Cylons arrive at the temple, presumably to look for the weapons hidden there by the resistance, and open fire after being met with resistance by civilians in the temple. Cally falls to the ground with her child, but Nora is shot and killed.
Webisode 5	September 19, 2006
Duck, visibly distraught over his wife's death, is visited by Tyrol and Jammer. When Tyrol tells him that the Cylons attacked the temple because the resistance had hidden weapons there, Duck angrily tells them to leave.
Webisode 6	September 21, 2006
Tigh and Barolay discuss how the attack at the temple has increased the support of the human population for the resistance and given them hundreds of new recruits, benefits that Jammer does not believe were worth the lives of the ten people killed at the temple.
Webisode 7	September 26, 2006
When Jammer is captured by the Cylons, Tigh worries that he will sell out the resistance, a view that is not shared by Tyrol. In the New Caprica Detention Center, Jammer is visited by a Number Five, who wishes to discuss the events at the temple.
Webisode 8	September 28, 2006
When the Number Five offers Jammer the chance to become an informant on the resistance, saying that it will save lives and work towards peace between Cylons and humans, Jammer balks at the proposition. However, Number Five gives Jammer a keycard to access the detention center should he change his mind.
Webisode 9	October 3, 2006
While Duck begins to clean up his tent and breaks down in mourning over his wife, Tyrol greets Jammer as he is released from detention. When asked about what the Cylons questioned him about, Jammer only responds that he did not tell the Cylons anything about the resistance.
Webisode 10	October 5, 2006
Tyrol is informed by Duck that he has joined the New Caprica Police in order to gather information for the resistance. Meanwhile, Tigh and Jean Barolay discuss their plan to produce explosives in the grain silo, located across from the hospital. When Tigh seems unconcerned about the potential for civilian casualties, Jammer leaves the room and joins Duck outside. Once Duck has left, Jammer reaches into his pocket and looks at the keycard Number Five gave him.

== Cast ==
- Michael Hogan as Saul Tigh
- Aaron Douglas as Galen Tyrol
- Nicki Clyne as Cally Tyrol
- Dominic Zamprogna as James "Jammer" Lyman
- Christian Tessier as Tucker "Duck" Clellan
- Matthew Bennett as Number Five / Aaron Doral
- Alisen Down as Jean Barolay
- Emily Holmes as Nora Clellan

== See also ==
- Battlestar Galactica episode list
- Battlestar Galactica franchise
- Battlestar Galactica (2004 TV series), the reimagined universe
