= The Unhealer =

2020 horror film

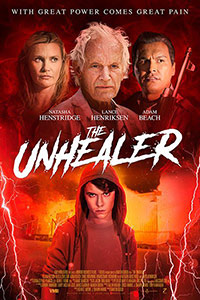
- Theatrical Release Poster
- Directed by: Martin Guigui
- Screenplay by: Kevin E. Moore; J.Shawn Harris
- Produced by: Galen Walker; Cristi Harris; J. Shawn Harris; Tony Hannagan
- Starring: Elijah Nelson; Kayla Carlson; Natasha Henstridge; Lance Henriksen; Adam Beach; Chris Browning; Branscombe Richmond; David Gridley; Gavin Casalegno; Will Ropp; Angeline Appel; Cristi Harris
- Cinematography: Massimo Zeri
- Edited by: Peter Devaney Flanagan; Eric Potter
- Music by: Marc Vanocur
- Distributed by: Shout! Factory (USA/Canada)
- Release dates: October 9, 2020 (Grimmfest film festival, Manchester, UK); June 8, 2021 (United States)
- Running time: 94 minutes
- Country: United States
- Language: English

The Unhealer is an American supernatural horror film written by Kevin E. Moore and J. Shawn Harris, directed by Martin Guigui, and produced by siblings Cristi Harris and J. Shawn Harris along with Tony Hannagan and Galen Walker. It stars Lance Henriksen, Natasha Henstridge, Adam Beach, Elijah Nelson, Branscombe Richmond, Chris Browning, Kayla Carlson, Angeline Appel, David Gridley, Will Ropp and Gavin Casalegno.

The film follows a bullied teenager who gains supernatural powers from a botched faith-healing then goes on a revenge spree after a high school assault by his tormentors results in the unthinkable.

The Unhealer had its world premiere at Grimmfest film festival, Manchester, England on October 9, 2020. After a festival run, it was officially released on DVD, Blu-ray, and streaming platforms on June 8, 2021.

== Plot ==
During the night, a drifter, Pflueger, desecrates a Native American burial plot in order to steal mystical powers lying within. He uses his newfound powers to act as a faith healer, drawing the attention of Red Elk, who had been tasked with protecting the grave and warns Pflueger to return the powers before they turn on him. Pflueger rudely dismisses him and leaves with Bernice Mason, who has begged him to come heal her son.

Kelly Mason is a high school student and bullied outcast due to his rare eating disorder called Pica, which causes him to eat inedible items. Outside of his warm relationship with his mother, his only reprieve is his childhood friend Dominique, on whom he has a mutual crush. However, his friendship with Dominique draws negative attention from a group of bullies, brothers Nelson and Reed, Tony, Brad, and Tucker. Unable to eat anything edible, he is dying from malnutrition, but when Pflueger attempts to heal him, he is overpowered and perishes; Kelly survives and his condition immediately improves.

Kelly discovers that Pflueger's powers transferred to him: not only does his body heal instantly, any pain given to his body is returned to the person who inflicted it, which he learns when Reed attempts to assault him for talking to Dominique. Bernice urges him to keep the powers a secret. However, others are drawn into his situation when the bullies confront him after a bonfire party. Brad, while following a bicycling Kelly, attempts to run him over with his car. However, when he hits Kelly, Brad is killed instantly. The others believe it was an accident caused by the car's airbags. Kelly heals quickly, leading the police, including Bud Adler, to believe that he is uninvolved, and Kelly reveals his powers to Dominique as they begin dating. Meanwhile, Red Elk is tracking down the supernatural powers and tries to confront Kelly, but the latter become spooked and leaves.

The bullies swear revenge on Kelly for Brad's death and try to run him and his mother out of town. When they believe that he and Bernice are away, they remove the cinderblock from their mobile home in an attempt to trash it. Unbeknownst to them, Bernice is unexpectedly at home, and the malicious destruction of property causes a gas explosion; she dies in Kelly's arms when he returns, leaving him devastated. At the funeral, Sarah, Tucker's girlfriend and Dominique's friend, encounters him finding Pflueger's grave and becoming ill after ingesting the plants growing on the plot.

After realizing that the bullies are responsible, he decides to take his own revenge. Learning that he can harm others by swallowing a piece of their clothing and then hurting himself, he forces Tucker to drown at the river and announces his intentions to the survivors. Alarmed by his behavior, Dominique urges him to get the others to confess instead of killing them. Kelly agrees and attempts to intimidate Tony into confessing during chemistry class, but the plan backfires when Tony splashes chemicals in Kelly's face, causing Tony's own face to melt. Traumatized by the sight, Sarah meets Nelson and reveals Kelly's weakness. When Kelly, having returned to his plan of revenge, goes to confront Nelson and Reed (with Sheriff Adler and the boys' father Gus looking on), Nelson gasses him with a concoction made from the plants on Pflueger's grave. Kelly is briefly weakened, but quickly regains his powers. Dominique arrives and urges him to stop his revenge before he kills anyone else, but when Gus attempts to shoot Kelly in the head, he ends up killing both himself and Nelson. Reed escapes, and is spared by Kelly, who recognizes that he has grown disillusioned with the other bullies and is not at fault.

Wanting to keep Dominique in his life, Kelly agrees to let Red Elk and Sheriff Adler help him remove his powers. However, during the ritual, Kelly begins to convulse, and Red Elk admits to a frantic Dominique that it will kill him, as he and the powers are too entwined. Unwilling to lose him, Dominique urges Kelly to keep his powers and flee, but they are interrupted by other police officers, who attempt to shoot Kelly and accidentally kill Dominique in the process. Grief-stricken, Kelly dies by suicide so that the powers end with him. Though Red Elk declares that the powers have left him, Dominique later wakes up fully healed in the ambulance, revealing that Kelly accidentally transferred the powers to her.

== Cast ==
- Elijah Nelson as Kelly Mason
- Kayla Carlson as Dominique Lemieux
- Natasha Henstridge as Bernice Mason
- Lance Henriksen as Reverend Stanley Pflueger
- Adam Beach as Sheriff Bud Adler
- Chris Browning as Coach Gus Whitcomb
- Branscombe Richmond as Red Elk
- David Gridley as Nelson Whitcomb
- Gavin Casalegno as Reed Whitcomb
- Will Ropp as Tony Miller
- Angeline Appel as Sarah
- Cristi Harris as Terry Lemieux
- Thomas Archer as Brad
- Mike Gray as Tucker
- Kevin E. West as Dr. Fitzgerald
- Corbin Timbrook as Mr. Crowley
- Dahlia Waingort as Ms. Skinner
- Shelby Janes as Paulette
- Linda Rae Jurgens as Mina
- Craig Hensley as Deputy Ruddock
- Tommy Goodwin as Deputy McCarthy
- Dave Cobert as Paramedic Ross
- Dejzon Walker as Paramedic Carter
- Justin Dean Jones as Chucky
- Mike Hauser as Preacher

== Release ==
The Unhealer was officially released June 8, 2021 in the US and Canada on DVD, Blu-ray, and streaming platforms, and in theaters in South Korea December 2, 2021.

== Reception ==
On review aggregator Rotten Tomatoes, the film holds an approval rating of 83%.
