= Angela Franklin =

- Night of the Demons character
- First appearance: Night of the Demons (1988)
- Last appearance: Night of the Demons (2009)
- Created by: Joe Augustyn
- Portrayed by: Amelia Kinkade; Shannon Elizabeth

In-universe information
- Species: Human (formerly); Demon
- Gender: Female
- Family: Melissa Franklin (sister)
- Location: California
- Classification: Mass murderer
- M.O. (modus operandi): Impalement, tongue-ripping, eye-gouging, targets everyone
- Race: Caucasian; German American

Angela Franklin is a fictional character from the Night of the Demons series of films. She is the only character to have appeared in every film in the series.

Created by screenwriter Joe Augustyn and portrayed by actress Amelia Kinkade in three films between 1988 and 1997, she is a young woman possessed by a demon, and attacks her victims if they enter the property of Hull House.

Angela is commonly identified by her black wedding dress, her seductive, trance-seducing erotic dancing, her disfigured face, burnt flesh caused by obsession of setting various body parts on fire, yellow glowing eyes, jagged teeth, and her deep maniacal voice. Wizard magazine rated her the 25th-greatest villain.

Angela is portrayed by Amelia Kinkade in all three of the original films. The character was renamed Angela Feld in the 2009 remake, in which she is portrayed by Shannon Elizabeth.

== Original films ==
=== Background ===
Angela was once considered to be a gifted student, one of the best in her class. However, in her senior year, she adopted a Goth lifestyle, wearing all black and gaining the reputation of a witch from her classmates. Her only source of companionship is her best friend, Suzanne.

=== Night of the Demons (1988) ===
On Halloween Night, 1988, Angela and Suzanne hold a Halloween party at Hull House, a funeral parlor that had been abandoned years earlier after a series of murders were committed there. They invite seven classmates, and one who was not invited shows up. During the party, Angela decides to have a past-life seance. Unfortunately, one of the teenagers interrupts the seance, which breaks the spell. Through this, a demon awakes in the crematorium of the house. It makes its way up into the living room and possesses Suzanne, who then possesses Angela. As the night progresses, Angela's personality changes. She begins dancing to disturbing songs in erotic fashions and killing her friends, turning them into demons. At daybreak the following morning, all of the demons are forced to abandon their hosts and return to hell. Only two teenagers, Judy Cassidy and Rodger Voorhees, are still alive. The police search the property and find all of the bodies, except for Angela's. They single her out as a suspect in the murders.

=== 1988 to 1993 ===
For six years, Hull House remains empty. Police keep a close watch on the house and continue the investigation. During those years, on some nights, people claim to see a ghostly figure of a woman in a black dress wandering around Hull House, and it looked like Angela Franklin.

In 1993, the police close the investigation and stop watching Hull House. On Halloween Night of 1993, Angela's parents receive a greeting card with dried blood all over it. On it in blood is Angela's signature. That night, both of her parents commit suicide. Leaving a sole survivor of Angela's sister Melissa (Mouse) Franklin.

=== Night of the Demons 2 (1994) ===
Angela haunts Hull House freely, killing anyone who dares to go inside.

Angela's sister, Melissa (Mouse) Franklin, now an orphan, is sent to St. Rita's Academy, a Catholic boarding school near Hull House. She constantly dreams about Angela. Her nightmares annoy her roommates Terri, Bibi, and the school bully, Shirley. A student at the school named Perry, interested in demonology, communicates with Angela.

On Halloween, Shirley and her friends avoid the school dance and decide to throw a party at Hull House. During the party, Shirley pretends to use incantations to resurrect Angela, but the incantations work, and Angela returns. A priest from the school, Father Bob, retrieves the students, bringing them back to school. But before leaving, Shirley steals a tube of lipstick that had belonged to Suzanne, and brings it back to school. By doing so, this allows Angela to cross over the underground stream, the only thing separating the demons from the outside world.

As the night progresses back at school, Angela possesses the students, such as Shirley, Z-Boy, and others. Angela captures Mouse and is going to use a ritual to sacrifice Mouse as an offering of her devotion to the devil. One of the nuns at the school, Sister Gloria, along with Bibi and her boyfriend, Johnny, use water balloons and a squirt gun filled with holy water to stop Angela and save Mouse. Angela turns into a giant, snake-like demon. The morning arrives and Angela dissolves into dust.

=== Night of the Demons 3 (1997) ===
Angela returns and continues to haunt Hull House in hopes of acquiring more party guests to take to hell. On Halloween Night a group of teens accidentally shoot a police officer and hide in Hull House. Angela appears and starts turning the group against each other and kills them off one by one, turning them into demons. Her primary target in the group is Holly, a virginal cheerleader who would be able help make Angela more powerful than ever. Holly and another teen, Nick survive. They destroy Angela by pulling her through the barrier of the underground stream. Angela melts into mush and her skeleton turns to dust. The two teens vow to keep a vigilant watch on Hull House every Halloween in case unsuspecting teenagers should decide to trespass on the property and become victims of Angela.

== Remake ==
In the 2009 remake of the first film, Angela is given the surname Feld, and throws a Halloween party at the abandoned New Orleans mansion once owned by Lady Evangeline Broussard (who had, decades early, unintentionally summoned seven demons banished from Hell, which would have overtaken the world had she not deprived them of a seventh and final host by killing herself). Angela's party is ended prematurely when the police crash it and send everyone home, with her "business partner" absconding with all the money they had managed to make in the chaos. When things die down, Angela and a few of her friends become trapped in the mansion when the gates lock and refuse to open. After discovering a hidden chamber containing the skeletons of the six original demon hosts, Angela becomes possessed after being bitten by a skull while trying to pry a gold tooth out of it. The demon possessing Angela soon helps its brethren possess five of the others, but they ultimately fail to capture a girl named Maddie (who fakes killing herself to trick them) before sunrise, and dissolve, becoming trapped in limbo.
