= Night Angel =

1990 film by Dominique Othenin-Girard

- Theatrical release poster
- Directed by: Dominique Othenin-Girard
- Written by: Joe Augustyn; Walter Josten
- Produced by: Joe Augustyn; Jeff Geoffray
- Starring: Isa Andersen; Linden Ashby; Debra Feuer; Helen Martin; Karen Black
- Cinematography: David Lewis
- Music by: Cory Lerios
- Production companies: Emerald Pictures; Paragon Arts International
- Distributed by: Fries Distribution Company
- Release date: 1990
- Running time: 90 minutes
- Country: United States
- Language: English

Night Angel is a 1990 American horror thriller film directed by Dominique Othenin-Girard and written by Joe Augustyn and Walter Josten. The film stars Isa Andersen as Lilith, a female demon who seduces men before killing them and consuming their souls.

== Cast ==
- Isa Andersen as Lilith
- Linden Ashby as Craig
- Debra Feuer as Kirstie
- Helen Martin as Sadie
- Karen Black as Rita
- Doug Jones as Ken
- Gary Hudson as Rod

== Production ==
=== Special effects ===
Special effects artist Steve Johnson contributed some of the film's effects—including a chest appliance through which Lilith plunges her hand, and a prosthetic arm for Lilith through which veins are visible—before leaving the production to work on the 1989 film The Abyss. The remainder of the effects were provided by Robert Kurtzman, Greg Nicotero, and Howard Berger, of KNB EFX Group.

== Reception ==
Gary Thompson of Philadelphia Daily News called it "a cheapie horror movie", writing that, "The only scary aspects of Night Angel are the images it invites you to conjure of similar behavior in your own office." In The Psychotronic Video Guide to Film, Michael J. Weldon wrote that, "A lot of things about this movie are painfully dumb, but it's still one of the best recent erotic horror movies, and many of the scenes and effects are excellent and surprising."

== Home media ==
In 2017, Night Angel was released on Blu-ray.
