= The Courier (2012 film) =

- DVD cover
- Directed by: Hany Abu-Assad
- Screenplay by: Brannon Coombs; Pete Dris
- Produced by: Michael Arata; Jeffrey Dean Morgan
- Starring: Jeffrey Dean Morgan
- Cinematography: Antonio Calvache
- Edited by: William Steinkamp
- Music by: Nima Fakhrara
- Production company: Arclight Films
- Distributed by: Well Go USA
- Release date: 2012
- Running time: 90 minutes
- Country: United States
- Language: English
- Budget: $13.6 million
- Box office: $58,387

The Courier is a 2012 American direct-to-video action film directed by Hany Abu-Assad and produced by Michael Arata and Jeffrey Dean Morgan, starring Morgan as a courier who specializes in delivering high-risk packages.

== Plot ==
The "courier" lives in a derelict flat where he has adopted a mouse as his pet. When he visits his old friend Stitch at his boxing gym, he is contacted by a stranger who tasks him with delivering a suitcase to a man known as "Evil Sivle". The stranger doesn't know where Sivle is, and explains that finding him is the actual task. It's made clear that the courier is at no liberty to refuse this mission, and will be killed should he fail. After the stranger threatens his loved ones, Stitch sends his family into hiding. The courier starts by hacking into the FBI database. When he needs a pilot, Stitch assigns him his adopted daughter, Anna. Although skeptical of her skill, the courier comes to respect her.

The courier's attempts to find Sivle only lead to killings. After another associate of Sivle's has been killed, the police arrest the courier. To his surprise, he is soon released and finds out that his unrequested client works for the FBI. The courier visits him at home and learns that the suitcase is from Russia and that the FBI considers it the only chance to get to Evil Sivle, who is an infamous assassin. The FBI agent also points out that Sivle is about to turn tables with the courier. Sivle orders a duo of assassins to kill Stitch and Anna.

The assassins kill Stitch. As the courier and Anna mourn his loss, the assassins attack them. The courier bugs the assassins. The FBI agent gets to Anna and convinces her to leak information about the courier's progress on the promise that the FBI can help fix the mess. When the courier finds out, he becomes angry and leaves her. Meanwhile when the assassins find out about the bug, they feed the courier with disinformation that leads to his capture and eventual torture. When they give him a rest, he escapes and kills them. Before dying, one reveals that Sivle is in a casino in Las Vegas. There, the courier realizes that the name Evil Sivle is "Elvis Live" backwards. When he finally confronts Evil Sivle, an Elvis impersonator at a Las Vegas club, Sivle reveals the truth: the courier is actually Sivle, and the man he has found is Maxwell, his old partner who told Sivle how he killed everyone but Sivle and his son, and Sivle suffered amnesia as a result of an injury. After Maxwell taunts Sivle about the death of his wife, Sivle kills Maxwell, leaving him without any way to find his son.

== Cast ==
- Jeffrey Dean Morgan as "The Courier"/ Sivle
- Mickey Rourke as Maxwell
- Josie Ho as Anna
- Til Schweiger as Agent Lispy
- Lili Taylor as Mrs Capo
- Miguel Ferrer as Mr Capo
- Mark Margolis as Stitch
- Alec Rayme as The Kidnapper

== Production ==
Derek Haas and Michael Brandt wrote the original script for The Courier in the late 90s based on an idea by Haas. The script generated considerable buzz within the industry when Brad Pitt expressed interest in starring in it. While The Courier got stuck in development hell, Haas and Brandt parlayed the initial momentum of the script to establish themselves as a highly sought after screenwriting team. By the time The Courier was finally made, Haas and Brandt noted how it had changed considerably from their initial premise.

== Release ==
The film was distributed by Well Go USA in 2012.

== Reception ==
Robert Kolarik of the San Antonio Express-News wrote that the film starts off well but loses its way once it starts to fill in the courier's back story. Gabe Toro of Indiewire rated it D+ and wrote that the film "almost seems embarrassed by its content". Tyler Foster of DVD Talk rated it 1.5/5 stars and wrote, "The Courier is a tired thriller, filled with tired actors playing tired characters, wrapped up in a tired story." Gordon Sullivan of DVD Verdict called it "a thoroughly average B-action-thriller" of interest only to Morgan's fans.
