= J.R.'s Masterpiece =

- Dallas episode
- Episode no.: Season 2 Episode 8
- Original air date: March 11, 2013

Guest appearances
- Ted Shackelford as Gary Ewing; Marlene Forte as Carmen Ramos; Kevin Page as Steve "Bum" Jones; Charlene Tilton as Lucy Ewing; Steve Kanaly as Ray Krebbs; Castulo Guerra as Carlos Del Sol; Kate del Castillo as Sergeant Ruiz; Cathy Podewell as Cally Harper; Deborah Shelton as Mandy Winger; Ken Kercheval as Cliff Barnes; Jerry Jones as himself; Mark Cuban as himself; Mike Rawlings as himself

Episode chronology
← Previous "The Furious and the Fast"	Next → "Ewings Unite!"

"J.R.'s Masterpiece" is the eighth episode in the second season (2013) of the television series Dallas. The episode features the funeral of J.R. Ewing (played by Larry Hagman), who was killed in the previous episode "The Furious and the Fast".

== Plot ==
The plot of the episode featured the funeral service of J.R. Ewing, as well as the memorial service, held at the Dallas Petroleum Club.

Guests in attendance include Cliff Barnes (Ken Kercheval), J.R.'s longtime rival who comes to pay his "disrespects"; Gary Ewing (Ted Shackelford), J.R.'s reformed alcoholic brother; Ray Krebbs, J.R.'s half brother; Lucy Ewing (Charlene Tilton), Gary's daughter and J.R.'s niece; J.R.'s second wife Cally Harper Ewing (Cathy Podewell); and Mandy Winger (Deborah Shelton), J.R's longtime mistress in the 1980s. Appearing as themselves are Dallas Mavericks owner Mark Cuban, Dallas Cowboys owner Jerry Jones, and Dallas mayor Mike Rawlings.

As a result of Hagman's death, and therefore his character's, the remaining season's plot will focus on the same question raised in the original series, "Who shot J.R.?" dubbed into "Who killed J.R.?"

== Production ==
Larry Hagman appeared in seven of the fifteen episodes slated for the season before his death. The plot of the season had to be retooled in order to compensate for the character's absence. Producers were keen for Victoria Principal's character, Pamela Barnes Ewing to make a return appearance to the show, especially following the death of J.R. In response to rampant speculation, Principal released a statement explaining the reason she would not be appearing any more as Pam.

=== Writing ===
Hagman's sudden death from throat cancer had caught the writing team off-guard; it was revealed J.R.'s absence from earlier first-season episodes was written in to accommodate Hagman, who was being treated for cancer. This was also not the first time J.R.'s absence from the show had to be written in. Cynthia Cidre's original pilot script included J.R. in a relatively important role to the series, but due to contractual disputes between Hagman and TNT, she was made to rewrite the script to utilize archive footage of the character, as well as reduce characters Sue Ellen Ewing and Bobby Ewing to recurring characters. As negotiations with the actors were completed, the roles of the series veterans were restored in the pilot and beyond.
