= Night of the Scarecrow =

- Film poster
- Directed by: Jeff Burr
- Written by: Reed Steiner; Dan Mazur
- Starring: Elizabeth Barondes; John Mese; Stephen Root; Bruce Glover; Dirk Blocker
- Cinematography: Thomas L. Callaway
- Edited by: Bob Murawski
- Music by: Jim Manzie
- Production company: Steve White Entertainment
- Distributed by: Republic Pictures
- Release dates: August 8, 1995 (Fantasy Filmfest); January 12, 1996 (U.S.)
- Running time: 85 minutes
- Country: United States
- Language: English

Night of the Scarecrow is a 1995 American supernatural slasher film directed by Jeff Burr, and starring Elizabeth Barondes, John Mese, Stephen Root, Bruce Glover, Dirk Blocker, John Hawkes, Gary Lockwood, and Martine Beswick. Its plot focuses on a small farming community where the spirit of a warlock is unleashed and possesses a scarecrow.

The film premiered at the Fantasy Filmfest in Berlin in August 1995, before premiering on home video in the United States through Republic Pictures in January 1996.

== Plot ==
After a devastating drought, townsfolk make a deal with a warlock that he has complete immunity in exchange for a bountiful harvest. At first all is well but the warlock eventually corrupts the townsfolk with hedonism. When Mayor Silas Goodman's own daughter is seduced, Silas has had enough and plans with the uncorrupted townsfolk to dispose of the warlock for good. After stealing the warlock's magic book and discovering the ways to use his own magic against him, the mayor and townsfolk drug the warlock and crucify him until he succumbs. The townsfolk burn his corpse and put the charred bones in a coffin. They put a charm on the coffin to make the cornfield forever bountiful, and bury it under the cornfield. Silas marks a page in the spell book showing how to destroy the warlock, as a precaution should his spirit ever be released, and creates an edict that all his descendants must erect a scarecrow as a reminder of the warlock.

In the modern day, Silas' descendant Mayor Goodman decides to build a mall on the cornfield. Two drunken workers driving the bulldozer at night accidentally break the stone coffin, releasing the spirit of the warlock which then possesses the scarecrow. The Scarecrow goes on a killing spree to retrieve his magic book, to regain his body and exact revenge on the town. The pastor reveals the story of the town to his niece Claire Goodman and her boyfriend before being killed by the Scarecrow. The Scarecrow kills the mayor and his wife when they refuse to divulge the whereabouts of the magic book. Sheriff Goodman comforts Claire and reveals that all first born of the Goodman family are given the magic book and told that if anything happens to him, his family should look for it in the attic as it contains something extremely important. They find the magic book.

The Sheriff defends his family and enables Claire and her boyfriend to escape before being killed. The book reveals that the only way to destroy the scarecrow is to destroy the warlock's bones. At first they try to use acid to dissolve the bones but the boyfriend spills the acid. Claire finally defeats the scarecrow by pulverizing the bones under a rock crusher.

== Cast ==
- Elizabeth Barondes as Claire Goodman
- John Mese as Dillon
- Stephen Root as Uncle Frank/The Sherriff
- Bruce Glover as Uncle Thaddeus
- Dirk Blocker as Uncle George
- Howard Swain as The Scarecrow
- Gary Lockwood as Mayor Goodman
- John Hawkes as Danny Thompson
- William Joseph Barker as Kyle
- Martine Beswick as Barbara
- Cristi Harris as Stephanie
- Cynthia Merrill as Lorraine
- Robert Harvey as Ben
- Duane Whitaker as Deputy #1
- Joe Unger as Deputy #2
- John LaZar as The Warlock

== Production ==
Filming of Night of the Scarecrow took place in northern California, primarily in the city of Hanford.

== Release ==
Night of the Scarecrow premiered at the Fantasy Filmfest in Berlin, Germany on August 8, 1995.

=== Home media ===
Republic Pictures released the film VHS on January 12, 1996.

The film was released on DVD and Blu-ray by Olive Films in 2013, with the same special features – an audio commentary with director Jeff Burr, a making of video, and a picture gallery.

== Reception ==
While Variety wrote that the director "has more luck with physical scenes than he does with coaxing inspired performances out of his actors", Blu-ray.com wrote that the director "stages things very effectively and gets some good performances out of a game cast." A reviewer for DVD Talk did not like the "inept circa-1995 CGI".

Jeffrey Kaufman of Blu-ray.com compared a violent scene in the film to a scene in another horror film with a murderous scarecrow, the television film Dark Night of the Scarecrow. A review for TV Guide noted: "A healthy dose of directorial style and energy makes this prosaic low-budget chiller a tense, entertaining diversion."

Adam Tyner, writing for DVD Talk, said: "It's kind of interesting seeing some of the familiar faces in the cast, and Night of the Scarecrow does trot out a few really nice looking setpieces, but none of that's enough to salvage this limp, lifeless, uninspired, instantly forgettable slasher flick. Skip It." In a retrospective for Rue Morgue, Benny Graves commended the film, writing: "For a supernatural slasher made in the 1990s, this movie is so lean, silly and packed full of scarecrow slaughter that it legitimately shocks me that more people don’t talk about it." Fangoria ranked the film among director Jeff Burr's best films in a 2023 retrospective.

== See also ==
- The Night of the Scarecrow
- Dark Night of the Scarecrow
- Scarecrow
- Scarecrows
