= Deal (2008 film) =

2008 film by Gil Cates Jr.

- Theatrical release poster
- Directed by: Gil Cates Jr.
- Written by: Gil Cates Jr.; Mark Weinstock
- Produced by: Michael Arata; Steve Austin; Albert J. Salzer
- Starring: Bret Harrison; Burt Reynolds; Charles Durning; Vincent Van Patten; Michael Sexton; Jennifer Tilly; Shannon Elizabeth
- Cinematography: Tom Harting
- Edited by: Jonathan Cates
- Music by: Peter Rafelson
- Production companies: Metro-Goldwyn-Mayer Pictures; Seven Arts Pictures; Tag Entertainment
- Distributed by: MGM Distribution Co.; (US and Canada); 20th Century Fox; (most countries)
- Release date: April 25, 2008
- Running time: 85 minutes
- Country: United States
- Language: English
- Box office: $85,076

Deal is a 2008 American drama film starring Burt Reynolds, Bret Harrison and Shannon Elizabeth. It follows the former poker player tutoring a younger player (Harrison). The film's climax is a fictional World Poker Tour championship. World Poker Tour commentators, Mike Sexton, Vince Van Patten and Courtney Friel played themselves. A number of other professional poker players and poker-playing celebrities, including Elizabeth, Jennifer Tilly, Phil Laak, Antonio Esfandiari, Greg Raymer, Chris Moneymaker and Isabelle Mercier are in the cast.

The film had its limited theatrical release by Metro-Goldwyn-Mayer on April 25, 2008 to universally negative reviews, with its strong criticism going towards its over-reliance on clichés from other sports films, as well as bad, unprofessional directing and editing for a major film studio, and bad acting from Reynolds. In addition, the film was a major box office bomb. In turn, it has been regarded as one of the worst films of all time, let alone within the sports film genre.

== Plot ==
Alex Stillman is a law student who plays poker online and in home games. He competes in an online tournament where the final table is played live on TV. Alex reaches the final table, but is eliminated first after being outmatched by professional player Karen "The Razor" Jones. The final table broadcast is watched by retired player Tommy Vinson, who feels that Alex has potential as a player but could use his help. Vinson tracks Alex down at a cash game and offers him his business card, which Alex refuses until Tommy impresses him by reading his last hand.

Alex finally calls Tommy and spends a few days with him, watching old videotapes of poker players and learning about tells and reading players. Tommy offers the kid a deal: he will stake Alex in poker games, and they will split his winnings 50/50. When Alex asks why Tommy does not just play himself, he reveals that he has not played a hand in twenty years. After going broke and nearly losing his house and wife, Tommy agreed to never again play a hand, at the risk of his wife leaving him. Tommy takes Alex to Las Vegas to play in a high-stakes cash game. He buys Alex in, and watches the kid take a few beatings and lose money. Tommy pulls him off the table and reveals that Alex has a tell, which he corrects. Alex turns the game around, and ends up cashing out ahead. Tommy suggests that Alex relax a little, and gets him to approach a beautiful woman at the bar named Michelle. Alex awkwardly approaches her and convinces her to go on a date with him, and she spends the night with him.

Tommy wants to take Alex to Louisiana to play in a poker tournament, but Alex is supposed to start his job at his father's law firm. Alex convinces his dad to give him a few extra days, under the pretext of taking a trip with his friend. Tommy tells his wife that he has to go to Cleveland for work, and the pair heads to the tournament. On the first day, Alex does really well and builds up a chip lead. Overnight, Tommy warns Alex that the other players will try to keep him awake with distractions, such as crank phone calls and knocks at the door. Alex does not listen and loses sleep to the distractions, resulting in him busting out of the tournament. On returning home, Tommy is confronted by his wife, Helen, about the money he has been using. He admits to bankrolling Alex, but swears he has not played a hand himself. Unmoved, Helen packs her things and leaves Tommy.

Tommy takes Alex back to Las Vegas for another tournament, during which he tries to reconnect with Michelle, but she does not return his calls. Alex does well at first, but starts getting flustered when he runs into another tough female opponent. Alex finally finds his stride, finishing the tournament in the money, making $120,000. Michelle finally calls Alex back, and the two spend the night together. Alex tries to convince her to spend more time with him, but she tells him that her father is in town and she has to leave. Later that night, while celebrating his win with Tommy, he sees Michelle with another man, and realizes she is a prostitute. Tommy tacitly admits to hiring her to help Alex relax, and an enraged Alex storms off. The next morning, Alex leaves Tommy's share of the winnings at the hotel desk, and tells him never to talk to him again.

Alex returns home to his angry parents, who know he has been playing poker rather than working. When his father reminds him who paid for his law school, Alex throws his $60,000 at him. Shocked at the money Alex has made, his parents reluctantly agree to let him compete in the World Poker Tour tournament in a few weeks. Tommy, deciding he has nothing to lose, enters the tournament as well. The two play for several days, with Alex quickly building up a chip lead, and Tommy slowly grinding his way up, until both players reach the final table. That evening, Helen returns to Tommy at his hotel, and apologizes for making him stay away from poker for so long. Alex's parents also arrive, finally supporting their son's poker playing. The next day, they both eliminate several players, until it is down to just the two of them. In the final hand, Tommy busts out Alex with a pocket pair of jacks.

Later that evening, Tommy confronts Alex to ask about his last hand. Alex confirms Tommy's suspicion that he had a lower pair than Tommy. In a flashback, we see that Alex actually folded the winning hand to let Tommy have the title he wanted for so long.

== Cast ==
- Bret Harrison as Alex Stillman
- Burt Reynolds as Tommy Vinson
- Charles Durning as Charlie Adler
- Shannon Elizabeth as Michelle
- Jennifer Tilly as Karen 'Razor' Jones
- Maria Mason as Helen Vinson
- Gary Grubbs as Mr. Stillman
- Caroline McKinley as Mrs. Stillman
- Brandon Olive as Ben Thomas
- Jon Eyez as Mike 'Double Diamond' Jackson
- Rio Hackford as Chasen
- J. D. Evermore as Tex Button
- Billy Slaughter as Announcer
- Courtney Friel as herself
- Phil Laak as himself
- Antonio Esfandiari as himself
- Vincent Van Patten as himself
- Scott Lazar as himself
- Chris Moneymaker as himself
- Greg Raymer as himself
- Isabelle Mercier as herself
- Mike Sexton as himself

== Production ==
Filming was held between April 18 to August 12, 2006. The majority of the film was shot for The World Poker Tour, as it set was shipped to New Orleans for filming.

During the production, Charles Durning treated the cast and crew to a tour of the National World War II Museum in New Orleans, and recounted his own World War II experience at Normandy during the D-Day invasion and in the Battle of the Bulge, where he was wounded and taken prisoner.

== Release ==
Originally set for release in 2007, the film eventually had its limited theatrical release in the US and Canada by Metro-Goldwyn-Mayer on April 25, 2008, and by 20th Century Fox in Germany on June 12, 2008. Most countries had never received a theatrical release and were instead given a direct-to-video release, with the latest release being in 2012. The film was then released on DVD and Blu-Ray from 20th Century Fox Home Entertainment on September 2, 2008.

=== Box office performance ===
The film opened from 50 theaters on April 25, 2008. On opening weekend, it was held at a very low 65th place, earning $35,281. In total, the film earned its theatrical run with $61,626 domestically and $23,450 internationally (including its release in Germany on June 12, with its opening of $17,105), bringing a worldwide total of $85,076, making it a huge failure at the box office.

== Reception ==
=== Critical reception ===
On the review aggregator website Rotten Tomatoes, 3% of 35 critics' reviews are positive, with an average rating of 3.2/10. The website's consensus reads: "Employing multiple cinematic clichés and milking stale performances, Deal proves inadequate for even the lowly regarded poker movie genre." Metacritic, which uses a weighted average, assigned the film a score of 35 out of 100, based on 9 critics, indicating "generally unfavorable" reviews. The film did not have advance press screenings upon its initial release.

Robert Bell of Exclaim! felt the characters were "mere clichés" going through the "sports movie formula" motions without "believable interaction or development" and saw Cates Jr's use of "snazzy student film editing" in the poker scenes made the film "slightly cheaper", saying: "[L]ethargically directed, poorly acted and predictable to the core, Deal is the rare film that actually makes televised poker tournaments seem energized and vivacious." Michael Rechtshaffen of The Hollywood Reporter criticized Cates Jr's filmmaking for sacrificing "crucial cinematic element[s]" during the poker scenes by utilizing "deadly staging" when shooting his actors, saying "the dull production obviously sees itself as an updated "Cincinnati Kid" for the World Poker Tour set, but the end result and its characters have all the originality and dramatic depth of a TV telecast." James Berardinelli felt the movie had "a checklist of clichés than an actual script", commended the "dull and unsuspenseful" poker sequences for being the film's saving grace, and criticized the character development and conversations for being "dead-in-the-water", calling it "the kind of disposable entertainment that can waste away 90 minutes of insomnia-driven late night channel surfing." Mark Olsen of the Los Angeles Times wrote that: "[The] direction by [Gil] Cates Jr. is inept at best, and the script by Cates and Marc Weinstock seems to operate under the assumption that trafficking in flabby clichés -- the kindly call girl, the scrappy youngster, the angry dad -- will somehow smooth over the underdeveloped characters." Scott Tobias of The A.V. Club gave the film an overall D grade, saying: "To think that a semi-major studio financed a production this low-rent and listless is amazing: Since when did MGM start making student films?"

Burt Reynolds received mixed reviews for his role as Tommy Vinson. Michael Phillips of the Chicago Tribune wrote: "Moving slowly these days, Reynolds does less than no acting in this role, and he's still the best thing in "Deal." J. R. Jones of the Chicago Reader noted that he effortlessly revives "his 70s screen persona as a strutting paragon of male shrewdness and sexuality." Wesley Morris of The Boston Globe saw "little bits of soul" in his performance despite the distracting facial touch-ups. Berardinelli said it was "not a great performance but it's passable and [it's] made more impressive by the amateurish work turned in by his fellow cast-mates." Olsen felt that Reynolds "doesn't convey any of the lightning bolt insouciance that made him arguably the greatest movie star of the '70s and '80s (really) but rather just stands there."

=== Accolades ===
Burt Reynolds was nominated for Worst Supporting Actor (also for In the Name of the King) at the 29th Golden Raspberry Awards, losing to Pierce Brosnan for Mamma Mia.

As of May 2024, it was ranked number 70 in a Rotten Tomatoes editorial on the 100 worst movies of all time, although 12 Critics in this rating deemed it the worst movie of all time and ever to be made.

The MWA - Movie Watchers of America deem this to be not only the worst movie ever made but that it is the worst movie ever to be made.

== See also ==
- List of 21st-century films considered the worst
- List of films set in Las Vegas
- List of sports films
- List of American films of 2008
