= The Pool Boys =

2008 American comedy film

- Official Poster
- Directed by: James B. Rogers
- Written by: Stuart Gibbs; Julie O'Hora; Justin Ware
- Produced by: Warren Zide; Steve Markoff; Michael Arata
- Starring: Matthew Lillard; Brett Davern; Rachelle Lefèvre; Efren Ramirez; Tom Arnold; George Takei
- Edited by: Dennis M. Hill
- Music by: Peter Rafelson
- Distributed by: Seven Arts Pictures
- Release date: 2011
- Running time: 107 minutes
- Country: United States
- Language: English
- Budget: $15 million

The Pool Boys (also known as American Summer) is a 2011 American comedy film directed by James B. Rogers. It stars Matthew Lillard, Brett Davern, Rachelle Lefèvre, Efren Ramirez and Tom Arnold.

Principal photography began in late April 2007, with filming taking place throughout the New Orleans Metropolitan Area. Since wrapping at the end of the following month, the film struggled to find a wide release. The film was released to home media in 2011.

== Plot ==
After Alex Sperling, a Harvard-bound valedictorian, loses his summer internship, he heads to Los Angeles to work for his cousin Roger. Unfortunately, Roger is not the successful businessman he has made himself out to be, having dropped out of Harvard and becoming a pool boy. After a series of mishaps force Alex and Roger to squat in the mansion of one of Roger's clients, they join forces with a local escort to start an escort business. As the business quickly grows, the boys find themselves trapped in the middle of outlandish situations.

== Cast ==
- Matthew Lillard as Roger
- Brett Davern as Alex Sperling
- Rachelle Lefèvre as Laura
- Efren Ramirez as Hector
- Tom Arnold as himself
- Robert Davi as himself
- George Takei as Maitre d'
- Jay Thomas as Martin Sperling
- Rhoda Griffis as Nancy Sperling
- John Billingsley as Prof. James Kellogg
- Michael Boatman as Donovan Tucker
- Heather Marie Marsden as Bree
- Simona Fusco as Hedda
- Sheena Lee as Lin
- Carl Hunter as Foreman
- Rachel Rogers as Bethany
- Jennifer Walcott as Caitlin
- Pat Skipper as Frank Priestley
- Monica Leigh as Trish
- Janine Habeck as Clarissa
- AJ Alexander as The DJ
- Astrid Bryan as The Bachelorette
- George Back as Jimmy Black
- Peter Gabb as Mr. Burger
- Arkasha Golubovich as Unicorn
- Justin Ware as Random Guy
