= Night of the Demons 2 =

1994 American horror film directed by Brian Trenchard-Smith

- Theatrical release poster
- Directed by: Brian Trenchard-Smith
- Written by: Joe Augustyn; James Penzi
- Produced by: Jeff Geoffray
- Starring: Merle Kennedy; Amelia Kinkade; Cristi Harris; Rick Peters; Jennifer Rhodes; Christine Taylor
- Cinematography: David Lewis
- Edited by: Daniel Duncan
- Music by: Jim Manzie
- Production company: Blue Rider Productions
- Distributed by: Republic Pictures
- Release date: May 13, 1994
- Running time: 95 minutes
- Country: United States
- Language: English
- Budget: $1.4 million or $2.7 million

Night of the Demons 2 is a 1994 American horror film directed by Brian Trenchard-Smith and starring Amelia Kinkade, Cristi Harris, Rick Peters, Jennifer Rhodes and Christine Taylor. It is the sequel to Night of the Demons and was released on home video in 1994 by Republic Pictures Home Video. Lionsgate released it on DVD in 2007; Olive Films released a widescreen DVD and a first time Blu-ray release on February 19, 2013. The film was followed by the 1997 sequel Night of the Demons 3.

== Plot ==
Six years have passed since the events at Hull House on Halloween, and many of the bodies left at Hull House were recovered except for Angela's; rumor persists she descended bodily into Hell. As it turns out, her parents committed suicide five years later after receiving a Halloween card with Angela's signature. A year later her sister Melissa, nicknamed 'Mouse' (Merle Kennedy), is now staying at St. Rita's Academy, a Catholic boarding school for troubled teenagers. She frequently has nightmares about her sister. Rumors spread around the school regarding Mouse, started by the school bully, Shirley (Zoe Trilling). The head nun at the school, Sister Gloria (Jennifer Rhodes), tries to put an end to it.

Shirley, after getting banned from the school Halloween dance for wrestling on the tennis courts with Kurt (Ladd York) decides to have her own Halloween party at Hull House. Mouse is invited and (as a prank) they fake carrying out a ritual sacrifice. She learns about this sacrifice through a stolen demonic ritual book. Along with her boyfriend Rick (Rick Peters) and Z-Boy (Darin Heames), Shirley tricks Johnny (Johnny Moran), Johnny's girlfriend, Bibi (Cristi Harris), Bibi's friend Terri (Christine Taylor) and Kurt to get Mouse to go with them to Hull House, awakening a now demonized Angela. After some bizarre incidents, the group flees the house, minus Z-Boy, who is possessed and raped by Angela in the attic.

Bibi brings a tube of lipstick out of the house which takes on a hellish life of its own. It quickly possesses Shirley and, one by one, Rick, Z-Boy, Terri and Kurt are possessed and/or murdered by demonic Angela (although Terri is saved when Sister Gloria exorcises the demon inside her with Holy Water). Angela's plan is to sacrifice Mouse to the Devil to prove her devotion to him. Sister Gloria, Johnny, Bibi, Father Bob (Rod McCary) and Perry return to Hull House in an attempt to rescue Melissa. Once arriving at the house, the five become separated and Father Bob is quickly killed by the demonic Rick. Johnny is saved by Perry from the demonic Kurt. Unfortunately, Perry is killed by Z-Boy. With the holy water the group brought, Bibi, Johnny and Sister Gloria kill the remaining demons, except for Angela.

After finishing off the demons, the three survivors find Melissa sleeping on an altar. Angela and Sister Gloria debate on what true faith is with Angela stating "Real faith can move mountains, your faith can't even move a mouse." Angela then decapitates Sister Gloria but the sister actually pulls her head down into her habit and survives. With one last ruse to save Melissa and the others, Sister Gloria agrees to take her place on the altar. Angela then hands the sword to Melissa, promising her a great source of power if she kills Sister Gloria. However, Melissa turns the tables and stabs Angela instead. Sister Gloria finishes Angela off with a super soaker filled with holy water. As the four try to leave, they are confronted again by Angela, who has taken the form of a Lamia. Angela attacks them but Johnny manages to kick a hole in the wall in the shape of a cross. The cross-shaped-sunlight falls upon Angela and she explodes. With Angela and her minions dead, Sister Gloria, Melissa, Bibi and Johnny leave the house and return to the school where they are greeted by everyone there. One student is then seen finding the demonic lipstick which turns into a snake and attacks her.

== Cast ==
- Amelia Kinkade as Angela Franklin
- Cristi Harris as Bibi
- Darin Heames as "Z-Boy"
- Robert Jayne as Perry
- Merle Kennedy as Melissa "Mouse" Franklin
- Rod McCary as Father Bob
- Johnny Moran as Johnny
- Rick Peters as Rick
- Jennifer Rhodes as Sister Gloria
- Christine Taylor as Terri
- Zoe Trilling as Shirley Finnerty
- Ladd York as Kurt
- Mark Neely as Albert
- Rachel Longaker as Linda

== Release ==
The film was given a limited theatrical release in California by Republic Pictures in May 1994.

== Reception ==
Night of the Demons 2 received mixed-to-positive reviews from critics. On the review aggregator website Rotten Tomatoes, 80% of 5 critics' reviews are positive, with an average rating of 6/10. Dread Central praised the film, giving it four out of five blades and stating that the film was "gory, funny, and the perfect treat for a dark and stormy night". In Generation Multiplex: The Image of Youth in Contemporary American Cinema, Timothy Shary wrote that while both films paired teen sexuality and demonic possession together, the teen characters in the sequel were more developed than in its predecessor. JoBlo.com criticized the film, stating that it "has a crappy storyline and no scares" but praised the movie's gore and the acting of Cristi Harris. DVD Verdict also praised the movie's gore as well as the comedic parts, citing the character of Sister Gloria as a highlight. The Los Angeles Times called the film "a smart, amusing horror picture boasting a capable cast".

== See also ==
- List of films set around Halloween
