= Amelia Kinkade =

American actress, dancer, and author

Amelia Kinkade is an American actress, dancer, and author. She played Angela Franklin in the horror series Night of the Demons, and has written several books about human–animal communication.

== Early life and education ==
Kinkade was born in Fort Worth, Texas. She graduated from Interlochen Arts Academy in Interlochen, Michigan with a major in modern dance. After relocating to Los Angeles, she studied acting at the Creative Acting Workshop under various acting coaches such as Robert Lewis and Lilyan Chauvin.

== Career ==
Kinkade's credits include television appearances on The Other Half, The James Van Praagh Show, VH1's Where Are They Now, London Tonight, The View, Extra, and The Jenny Jones Show.

In 2002, she was invited to Buckingham Palace to work with the household cavalry of Queen Elizabeth II and to "whisper" with the hunting horses of Prince Charles.

=== Dancer ===
After moving to Los Angeles, Kinkade undertook a career as a professional jazz dancer and choreographer. As a lead dancer, she performed with Smokey Robinson, Ray Charles, The Four Tops, and a multitude of Motown stars in the TV series The Motown Review. She was a featured dancer in Breakin' 2: Electric Boogaloo, Girls Just Want to Have Fun, Body Rock, and Fast Forward, among others. Amelia toured with Donna Summer and appeared in rock videos by the Stray Cats, Cher, Scorpions, Yarbrough and Peoples, and Sheena Easton.

=== Actress ===
As an actress, Kinkade has performed in television series and films. Her most prominent role is as the villainess Angela Franklin in the horror series Night of the Demons. She reprised the role of Angela Franklin in Night of the Demons 2 and Night of the Demons 3. She has also appeared on such TV shows as The Golden Girls, General Hospital, Knight Rider, and Fame. She has appeared in films including Girls Just Want to Have Fun, Breakin' 2: Electric Boogaloo and Road House. She was credited in some of these as "Mimi Kinkade", her screen name at that time. She played the character of Vivian on the daytime TV drama The Young and the Restless starting in 1990.

=== Pet communicator ===
Kinkade has offered her services as a professional psychic pet communicator. In this role she undertakes to communicate with a house pet, and tell the human owners what the pet is thinking. She also offers to help find missing pets. The New York Times wrote of her in 2001 that "Ms. Kinkade could be on the brink of becoming the nation's first celebrity pet communicator. She appeared in a television pilot, communing with Tammy Faye Bakker's dog." Lauren Bishop, writing in the Cincinnati Enquirer in 2006, referred to her as "the real-life Dr Doolittle".

Ashley Fantz, writing in the Miami Herald in 2002, said that the exercises in a two-day seminar led by Kinkade "had as much to do with their [the owners'] psychological issues as with the dogs and cats sleeping the afternoon away."

Melanie White, writing in the Jackson Hole News and Guide described one of Kinkade's two-day seminars: "...she will teach participants how to tap into their innate telepathic abilities. For $250, it might be possible to speak to any creature from mammal to insect—and even alive or dead." White also mentioned that Kinkade taught a segment of the "Kindred Spirits" retreat in 2004 and 2005.

Candice Reed, writing in the Californian, referred to Kinkade as a "world-renowned animal psychic and author" and said that "Kinkade has made the celebrity circuit with her psychic skills".

== Books ==
- Kinkade, Amelia (2001). Straight from the Horse's Mouth: How to Talk to Animals and Get Answers. New York: Crown. ISBN 0-609-60769-3. OCLC 45002280.
- Kinkade, Amelia (2006). The Language of Miracles: A Celebrated Psychic Teaches You to Talk to Animals. Novato, Calif.: New World Library. ISBN 1-57731-510-3. OCLC 62525099.
- Kinkade, Amelia (2013). Soulmates with Paws, Hooves, and Wings (2nd ed.). Charleston, South Carolina. ISBN 978-1-4825-2115-3. OCLC 871007909.
- Kinkade, Amelia (2016). Whispers from the Wild: Listening to Voices from the Animal Kingdom. Novato, California: New World Library. ISBN 978-1-60868-396-3. OCLC 936350852.

== Critical reaction ==
Kevin Thomas writing in the Los Angeles Times said that Night of Demons 2: "is a smart, amusing horror picture boasting a capable cast composed primarily of promising and attractive young actors ..."

Shock Till you Drop wrote:

In 1988, director Kevin Tenney whipped up a delicious, trashy brew of teen misbehavior, demonic possession, and lest we forget a shot of actress Linnea Quigley's ass that can never be topped, in Night of the Demons. ... the film propelled actress Amelia Kinkade – as the snaggletoothed hell-bitch "Angela" – into two sequels.

Ashley Fantz, writing in the Miami Herald, described Straight from the Horse's Mouth as "half feel-good memoir, half guide to channeling Tweetie".

Publishers Weekly wrote of Straight from the Horse's Mouth:

Peppered with heartwarming anecdotes about some of her cases, her book is primarily a guide to becoming an animal communicator—something she believes is possible for any animal lover. ... A first-rate guide for those who wish to talk to animals, this book may not satisfy readers who primarily enjoy stories of human-animal communion.

Chung Ah-young, writing in The Korea Times said of The Language of Miracles (in Korean translation):

The book includes abundant stories of her numerous pupils, including Wright, who "succeed" in communicating with animals. ... Her candid and passionate writings break skepticism and doubt about communicating with animals. It demonstrates that consciousness is not just an exclusive feature but one shared by all living creatures.
