= Hal Havins =

American actor

Hal Havins is an American actor known for his roles in horror films such as Night of the Demons and Sorority Babes in the Slimeball Bowl-O-Rama.

== Select filmography ==
=== Film ===
- 1988 Sorority Babes in the Slimeball Bowl-O-Rama as Jimmie
- 1988 Night of the Demons as "Stooge"
- 1988 Blueberry Hill as Gas Station Attendant
- 1989 Witchtrap as Elwin
- 1990 Welcome Home, Roxy Carmichael as Raymond Emirts
- 1996 Hard Time as Tony
- 1999 Life as Billy
- 2006 Kill Your Darlings as Bud
- 2010 Drop Dead Gorgeous as Billy Dea

=== Television ===
- 1986 Blue de Ville (TV film) as "Shoe"
- 1988 The Return of Desperado (TV film) as Fletch
- 1988 ALF (2 episodes) as Officer Gaffney
- 1991 Line of Fire: The Morris Dees Story (TV film) as Teddy Kysar
- 1995 MADtv (4 episodes) as Various Roles
- 2007 The Line-Up (TV film) as Chris
- 2017 Fear the Walking Dead (2 episodes) as Bob, The Rancher
