= Cathy Podewell =

American actress (born 1964)

- Born: January 27, 1964 (age 62); Evanston, Illinois, United States
- Education: University of California, Santa Barbara
- Occupation: Actress
- Years active: 1985–1995, 2013–present
- Spouse: Steven Glueck (m. 1989)
- Children: 3

Cathy Podewell (born January 27, 1964) is an American actress known for playing the role of Cally Harper Ewing on Dallas from 1988 to 1991, 2013.

== Early life and education ==
Podewell was born in Evanston, Illinois. She moved to Walnut Creek, California and was raised there by her father, a teacher, and her mother, a real estate agent. Her paternal grandparents, Lester Podewell and Beverly Younger, were also actors. She attended the University of California, Santa Barbara where she studied theater arts and dancing.

== Career ==
Podewell is best known for playing Cally Harper Ewing, the second wife of the character J.R. Ewing, on Dallas from 1988 to 1991 and was nominated for the Soap Opera Digest Award for Outstanding Lead Actress. In 2013, Podewell reprised her role as Cally Harper for J.R. Ewing's funeral episode in the second season of the new Dallas. Podewell had guest appearances on television series, including Evening Magazine, Boys Will Be Boys, The Oprah Winfrey Show, Live! with Regis and Kathie Lee, The Pat Sajak Show, The Byron Allen Show, Valerie's Family: The Hogans, Murder, She Wrote, Beverly Hills, 90210, Guns of Paradise, Walker, Texas Ranger and Growing Pains. Podewell also had a guest appearance on the game show Win, Lose or Draw.

Podewell starred in the 1988 horror film Night of the Demons and appeared in the 1989 comedy film Beverly Hills Brats. Podewell also starred in the TV film Earth Angel (1991) with Cindy Williams, Mark Hamill, and Eric Estrada.

== Personal life ==
Podewell married Steven Glueck on May 28, 1989. They have three children.

== Filmography ==
Year	Title	Role	Notes
1985	Lady Blue	Peggy Brennan	Episode: "Beasts of Prey"
1988	Valerie's Family: The Hogans	Courtney	Episode: "The King and I"
1988	Growing Pains	Lydia Shayne	Episode: "Dance Fever" (Part 1 & 2)
1988	Night of the Demons	Judy Cassidy	Feature film
1988	Evening Magazine	Herself - Guest	News magazine
1988	Boys Will Be Boys	Lana	Episode: "Two Men and a Baby"
1988–1991	Dallas	Cally Harper Ewing	Main cast (70 episodes)
1989	Beverly Hills Brats	Tiffany	Feature film
1989	Win, Lose or Draw	Herself - Panelist	Game show
1989	The Pat Sajak Show	Herself - Guest	Talk show
1989	The Byron Allen Show	Herself - Guest	Talk show
1990	The Oprah Winfrey Show	Herself - Guest	Talk show
1991	Guns of Paradise	Laura	Episode: "The Women"
1991	Earth Angel	Angela	Feature film
1991	Murder, She Wrote	Beth Dawson	Episode: "Unauthorized Obituary"
1993	Beverly Hills, 90210	Ginger O'Hara / Marla Crawford	Episode: "She Came in Through the Bathroom Window"
1994	Live! with Regis and Kathie Lee	Herself - Guest	Talk show
1995	Walker, Texas Ranger	Audrey 'Candy Delight' Forrester	Episode: "Blue Movies"
2013	Dallas	Cally Harper	Episode: "J.R.'s Masterpiece"
2014	Unmatched	Mother	Short film
2016	Be Here Now	Mother	Short film

== Award nomination ==
- 1991: Nomination – Soap Opera Digest Award for Outstanding Lead Actress: Prime Time
