= Christian Tessier =

Canadian actor and singer (born 1977)

- Born: January 23, 1977 (age 49); Kingston, Canada
- Occupation: Actor-singer
- Years active: 1989–present

Christian Tessier (born January 23, 1977) is a Canadian actor and singer who began his career as a child actor on You Can't Do That On Television. He has since appeared in numerous TV and film roles.

== Early life ==
Tessier was born in Toronto on January 23, 1977. He graduated from Etobicoke School of the Arts with a course of acting.

== Career ==
=== Early career ===
Tessier first came to television in 1989 to 1990, appearing in 18 episodes of the Canadian children's show You Can't Do That on Television. He notably appeared in the remake of The Tomorrow People (1992 to 1995), and the motion picture adaptation of Battlefield Earth as Mickey. He also appeared on two episodes in the TV series Are You Afraid of the Dark? (1992's "Laughing in the Dark" and 1994's "The Curious Camera"). He also appeared in the 1992 episode of the animated TV series A Bunch of Munsch ("The Paper Bag Princess"), He also appeared in the teen drama special, Crystal Clear, and on a 1996 episode of the TV series Goosebumps ("Say Cheese and Die!").

=== Later career ===
Later in his career, Tessier appeared in A Call to Remember and five episodes of Battlestar Galactica as Tucker Clellan, Duck served as a Colonial Viper pilot aboard the Battlestar Galactica and was a central character in the webisode series Battlestar Galactica: The Resistance. He also had played Aaron in The Day After Tomorrow, but his scene was deleted. In this scene Aaron is a surfer and is killed by a tsunami. He played a minor role in the gay-themed mystery Ice Blues. He appeared in the 2014 Godzilla, but his part was cut for the final film. He also appeared in Wayward Pines and 19-2.

=== Singing career ===
In 2011, Tessier appeared in a song "Whatever It Is" with Rel!g!on.

== Personal life ==
He currently lives in Canada.

== Filmography ==
=== Film ===
Year	Title	Role	Notes
1992	Eli's Lesson	Steve	
1996	Natural Enemy	Chris	Direct-to-video
1997	Habitat	Herb	Direct-to-video
1997	Night of the Demons 3	Orson	Direct-to-video
1999	Time at the Top	Soldier	
2000	Battlefield Earth	Mickey	
2001	The Score	Drunk	
2003	Levity	Clubgoer #1	
2003	Shattered Glass	Cade	
2003	Timeline	MRI Technician	
2004	Taking Lives	Interrogation Officer	
2004	The Day After Tomorrow	Aaron	
2004	Power Corps.	Faulkner	
2008	Ice Blues	Skopes	
2010	The A-Team	Tahoe Prison Deputy	
2012	Underworld: Awakening	Security Guard #1	
2014	Godzilla	Muto Crow's Nest Tech #3	
2016	Home Invasion	Xander	
2020	Welcome to the Circle	Michael	

=== Television ===
Year	Title	Role	Notes
1989-1990	You Can't Do That on Television	Christian	18 episodes
1990	The Woman Who Raised a Bear as Her Son	Tuk	Television film
1991	Urban Angel	Alfredo	Episode: "Postcards from the Past"
1991	Heritage Minutes	Orphan	Episode: "Orphans"
1991	Real Mature	Various	Television film
1992	Road to Avonlea	Mole	Episode: "When She Was Bad, She Was Horrid: Part 2"
1992, 1994	Are You Afraid of the Dark?	Kullback / Josh	2 episodes
1992	A Bunch of Munsch	Prince Ronald	Episode: "The Paper Bag Princess"
1992–1995	The Tomorrow People	Megabyte	26 episodes
1992	For Better or for Worse: A Christmas Angel	Lawrence Poirier	Television film
1993	For Better or for Worse: A Valentine from the Heart	Lawrence Poirier	Television film
1993	For Better or for Worse: The Good-for-Nothing	Lawrence Poirier	Television film
1996	Goosebumps	Mickey Ward	Episode: "Say Cheese and Die"
1997	A Call to Remember	Mike Banks	Television film
1997	The Wonderful World of Disney	Bodean	Episode: "Angels in the Endzone"
1998	The Mystery Files of Shelby Woo	Ricky Seaver	Episode: "The Baseball Fan Mystery"
1999	The Hunger	Cop #3	Episode: "Sanctuary"
2001	All Souls	Joey Passamontes	6 episodes
2001	Dice	Bill	6 episodes
2002	Largo Winch	Ben Gilliam	Episode: "Love Hurts"
2005	Ten Days to Victory	Farley Mowat	Television documentary
2005–2006	Battlestar Galactica	Tucker 'Duck' Clellan	5 episodes
2006	The Collector	Patrick	Episode: "The Vampire"
2006	Whistler	Scott	Episode: "Gathering Clouds"
2006	Saved	Shank / Dutch	3 episodes
2006	Battlestar Galactica: The Resistance	Lt. Tucker 'Duck' Clellan	6 episodes
2007	Supernatural	Wayne	Episode: "Bad Day at Black Rock"
2008	Yeti: Curse of the Snow Demon	Dennis	Television film
2010	Fringe	Shapeshifter	Episode: "Northwest Passage"
2010	Smoke Screen	Knox	Television film
2010	Caprica	Francis	3 episodes
2011	Human Target	Pilot	Episode: "Communication Breakdown"
2011	Psych	Chad Emigh	Episode: "In for a Penny..."
2012	Emily Owens, M.D.	Leo	Episode: "Pilot"
2012	Midnight Sun	Teddy	Television film
2014–2017	19-2	Marc Chartier	4 episodes
2015	The 100	Caspian	Episode: "Rubicon"
2015	Backstrom	Sanford Einhorn	Episode: "Enemy of my Enemies"
2015	Impastor	Vic	2 episodes
2015	Minority Report	Marcel	Episode: "Mr. Nice Guy"
2015	Fear the Walking Dead	Guardsman #2	Episode: "The Good Man"
2015–2016	Wayward Pines	Bartender	6 episodes
2016	Bates Motel	Stephen	2 episodes
2017	Real Detective	Detective Chuck Johnson	Episode: "Lambs to the Slaughter"
2021	Sweet Tooth	Meatballs	Episode: "Part One"
