= Jennifer Rhodes =

American actress

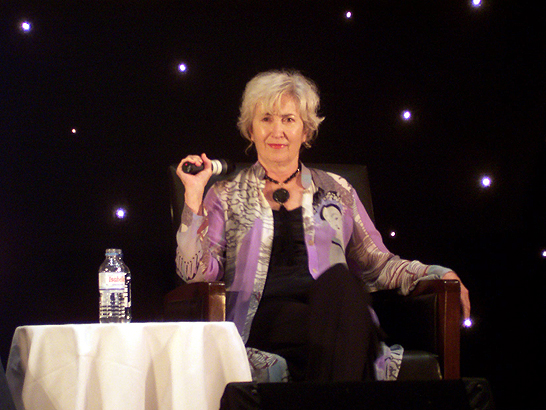
- Rhodes in 2021
- Born: Janice Wilson
- Occupation: Actress
- Years active: 1971–present

Jennifer Rhodes (born Janice Wilson) is an American actress best known in her many television roles specifically TV shows such as Friends and Gilmore Girls but she is mainly known for her role as Penny Halliwell on Charmed.

== Life and career ==
The daughter of Bennie and Clara Wilson, she grew up in Rosiclare, Illinois, and graduated from Rosiclare Community High School in 1957. She became interested in theater while attending Southern Illinois University and moved to New York City soon after graduating. She studied acting and began getting cast for theatre roles. She eventually moved to Los Angeles where she stopped acting for a while because she felt, as a stage actress, she didn't know very much about acting for television or movie roles.She eventually auditioned successfully for commercials roles, later moving on to television and film.

Rhodes' first credited role was in the 1960s television series The High Chaparral as the character Tanea. In 1980, she played a press secretary on a made-for-TV movie about Jackie Kennedy.In 1988, she appeared in the New World Pictures film Heathers as Winona Ryder's mother. She appeared on the following select series: Fame, Matlock, Little House on the Prairie, L.A. Law, Quantum Leap, Knots Landing, Designing Women, Full House, Red Shoe Diaries, Party of Five, ER, Wings, Murphy Brown, 3rd Rock from the Sun, Family Matters, Friends, Popular, The Agency, and Boston Public. She also appeared on the Disney Channel's The Suite Life on Deck.

Rhodes may be best known as Penny "Grams" Halliwell on The WB series Charmed, where she starred as the ghost of the Charmed Ones's grandmother and the tough-as-nails matriarch of the Halliwell clan. Although not a regular she did appear frequently throughout all 8 seasons of the original series.

Her first regular series role was in Nightingales as the character Effie Gardner.

== Filmography ==
=== Film ===
- Stand Up and Be Counted (1972) - (uncredited)
- Big Rose: Double Trouble (1974, TV Movie)
- The Towering Inferno (1974) - Janet - Secretary (uncredited)
- The Death of Richie (1977, TV Movie) - Elaine
- Red Light in the White House (1977) - Carrie Russell
- Night Creature (1978) - Georgia
- Halloween (1978) - Psych Ward Nurse (uncredited)
- Sketches of a Strangler (1978) - Eileen
- Jacqueline Bouvier Kennedy (1981, TV Movie) - Press Secretary
- I'm Going to Be Famous (1983)
- Ghost Fever (1986) - Madame St. Esprit
- The Eleventh Commandment (1986)
- Body Count (1987, TV Movie)
- Slumber Party Massacre II (1987) - Mrs. Bates
- Heathers (1988) - Veronica's Mom
- Nightingales (1988, TV Series) - Effie Gardner
- Twenty Dollar Star (1990) - Renee
- Frame-Up II: The Cover-Up (1992) - Brook's Landlady
- Exiled in America (1992) - Sister Mary Catherine
- The Baby Doll Murders (1993) - Mrs. Landers
- There Was a Little Boy (1993, TV Movie) - Dr. Blum
- Doorways (1993, TV Movie) - Mother
- Night of the Demons 2 (1994) - Sister Gloria
- Killing Obsession (1994) - Ella
- Skeletons (1997, TV Movie) - Mrs. Gallway
- The Killers Within (1997) - Hanna
- Cold Case (1997, TV Movie) - Miranda Allison
- Chasing Tchaikovsky (2007) - Mrs. Winnington
- Let the Game Begin (2010) - Hope
- Class (2010, TV Movie) - Judge
- Dispatch (2011) - Mrs. Gordon
- The Lost Medallion: The Adventures of Billy Stone (2013) - Ms. Sally
- Lovesick (2013) - Mother

=== Television ===
Year	Title	Role	Notes
1971	The High Chaparral	Tanea	Episode: "A Man to Match the Land"
1971	The Bold Ones: The New Doctors	Nurse	Episode: "Close Up"
1973	Barnaby Jones	2nd Woman	Episode: "Sunday: Doomsday"
1973	The New Perry Mason	Dina Landon	Episode: "The Case of the Spurious Spouse"
1978	James at 15	Mrs. Phillips	Episode: "Actions Speak Louder"
1978	Lou Grant	Dr. Roberta Giani	Episode: "Poison"
1979	The Rockford Files	Jean Martine	Episode: "Just a Coupla Guys"
1979–1982	Little House on the Prairie	Mrs. Hale / Nurse	2 episodes
1980–1990	Knots Landing	Attorney / Chairperson	3 episodes
1985	Fame	Joyce Chapman	3 episodes
1986	Matlock	Gracie Fielder	Episode: "The Stripper"
1986	Mike Hammer	Carlie Jameson	Episode: "Dead Pigeon"
1987	Cagney & Lacey	Adele	Episode: "You've Come a Long Way, Baby"
1987–1988	L.A. Law	D.D.A. Gylkowski	2 episodes
1987–1988	The Days and Nights of Molly Dodd	Andrea Buxbaum	2 episodes
1988	CBS Summer Playhouse	Queen Illizi	Episode: "Further Adventures"
1989	Nightingales	Effie Gardner	6 episodes
1989	Quantum Leap	Agnes Stevens	Episode: "Blind Faith"
1990–1991	Equal Justice	Judge Justice Billings	4 episodes
1990	Adam 12	Mrs. Korowski	Episode: "Neighbors"
1990	Doogie Howser, M.D.	Dr. Butterworth	Episode: "Car Wars"
1990	Gabriel's Fire	Connie DiFranco	Episode: "Windows"
1991	Designing Women	Ms. Tauber	Episode: "The Big Circle"
1991	Morton & Hayes	Hunt Guest #2	Episode: "Society Saps"
1991	Reasonable Doubts	Mrs. Leeds	Episode: "Daddy's Little Girl"
1992	The Heights	Mrs. Mazelli	Episode: "What Does It Take?"
1992	Full House	Liz Larson	Episode: "Designing Mothers"
1995	Red Shoe Diaries	Mom	Episode: "Divorce, Divorce"
1995	Party of Five	Carolyn Prousky	Episode: "The Trouble with Charlie"
1995	The Larry Sanders Show	Irene Goodman	Episode: "Hank's Sex Tape"
1996	ER	Mrs. Henry	Episode: "It's Not Easy Being Greene"
1996	Wings	Mavis	Episode: "Lynch Party"
1996	Murphy Brown	Mrs. Crawford	Episode: "Office Politics"
1996	3rd Rock from the Sun	Mrs. Sumner	4 episodes
1997	High Incident	Gloria	Episode: "Knock, Knock"
1997	Friends	Mrs. Lynch	Episode: "The One Where They're Going to Party!"
1998	Family Matters	Blanche Geiss	Episode: "Lost in Space: Part 1"
1998	Maggie	Owner	Episode: "The Maris Syndrome"
1999–2006	Charmed	Penny 'Grams' Halliwell	14 episodes
1999	Ally McBeal	Gladys Claven	Episode: "Only the Lonely"
1999	Time of Your Life	Roberta	Episode: "The Time the Truth Was Told"
2001	Popular	Joanie Salk	Episode: "I Know What You Did Last Spring Break"
2001	The Agency	Mary Orland	Episode: "Closure"
2002	The District	Margaret De Sica	Episode: "The Killing Point"
2003	Boston Public	Claire's Mother	2 episodes
2006	Gilmore Girls	Beverly	Episode: "Lorelai's First Cotillion"
2007	Cold Case	Miranda Allison '07	Episode: "Devil Music"
2008	The Young and the Restless	Leilani	3 episodes
2009	The Suite Life on Deck	Mrs. McCracken	Episode: "Kitchen Casanova"
2010	CSI: Crime Scene Investigation	Aunt Nellie Porter	Episode: "Irradiator"
2012	The Mentalist	Wealthy Woman	Episode: "Red Rover, Red Rover"
2013	See Dad Run	Rose	Episode: "See Dad Swoon"
2014	Sean Saves the World	Betty	Episode: "The Wrath of Sean"
2015	Grey's Anatomy	Jean Dominy	Episode: "I Feel the Earth Move"
2016	Mary + Jane	Doris	Episode: "420"
2017	Famous in Love	Letti Devon	Episode: "Some Like It Not"
2017	Teachers	Mrs. Foley	Episode: "Nightmare on Fillmore Street"
2019	All Rise	Emma Kelleher	Episode: "The Pharmacy"
2019	Grace and Frankie	Cathleen	Episode: "Uncommon Women and Mothers"
2022	NCIS	Claudia	Episode: "The Brat Pack"
