= Cristi Harris =

American actress

- Born: December 3, 1977 (age 48); East Point, Georgia
- Years active: 1992–present

Cristi Harris (born December 3, 1977, in East Point, Georgia, U.S.) is an American actress, who appeared in the horror films Night of the Demons 2 (1994) and Night of the Scarecrow (1995). From 1998 to 1999 she as Emily Davis in NBC soap opera Sunset Beach. She also had a short guest role as Tina Simms on NBC soap opera Passions.

Harris became a film producer with The Unhealer teaming up with her brother J. Shawn Harris.

== Filmography ==
=== Film ===
Year	Title	Role	Notes
1992	Rescue Me	Cathy	
1994	Night of the Demons 2	Bibi	
1995	Night of the Scarecrow	Stephanie	
1997	Kiss of Death	Peggy Botticelli	
1998	Lurid Tales: The Castle Queen	Amy	
2002	Star Quality	Amy Randal	Also producer
2018	Mister Sadpants	Charlie Anderson	
2020	The Unhealer	Terry	Also producer Berlin Independent Film Festival Award for Best Sci-Fi / Horror Feature

=== Television ===
Year	Title	Role	Notes
1992	Growing Pains	Becca	Episode: "The Five Fingers of Ben"
1993	Full House	Rachel Taylor	Episode: "Prom Night"
1998-1999	Sunset Beach	Emily Davis	Series regular
2004	NCIS	Vicki Spain	Episode: "UnSEALeD"
2004-2005	Passions	Tina Simms	Recurring role
