= Michael Arata =

American actor and film producer (born 1966)

- Arata in 2008
- Born: February 23, 1966 (age 60)
- Occupations: Film, stage actor
- Years active: 1970 - present

Michael Arata (born February 23, 1966) is an American actor and film producer. He began his acting career at age four and has since appeared on stage, in feature films and television programs.

Arata was born in New Orleans, Louisiana. As an actor, he has worked with Academy Award winners Oliver Stone, Gene Hackman, Kevin Costner, Jamie Foxx, Tatum O'Neil, Kim Hunter, Billy Bob Thornton, Denzel Washington, Ellen Burstyn and Sissy Spacek, and has appeared on stage with Sir Kenneth Branagh, Ben Kingsley, and Rosemary Harris, as well as Alec Baldwin and Elizabeth Ashley in Tennessee Williams's classic The Night of the Iguana.

In addition to his film history, Arata has extensive theater experience, including acting and producing the works of Tennessee Williams, Caryl Churchill, Tony Kushner, and William Shakespeare. In 1997, American Theatre Magazine hailed Arata's performance of Stanley Kowalski in the 50th anniversary production of Tennessee Williams' classic A Streetcar Named Desire as "unhinged and electrifying", and reviewer Dalt Wonk called the performance "a Stanley for our times".

Prior to Hurricane Katrina, Arata produced Shakespeare in City Park in New Orleans, the city's only outdoor theater, as well as several productions in conjunction with the Tennessee Williams Literary Festival.

== Movie producing ==
In 1989, Michael Arata began producing films, starting with his first short film "Looking For Someone". The film won the Grand Jury Award for Best Narrative Short at the Utah Short Film Festival.

Since then, Arata has produced documentaries ("The People's Story" on the devastation caused by Hurricane Mitch in Central America winner of the Houston International Film Festival and Telluride Independent Film Festival; Shaolm Y'all, discussing southern Jewish culture, winner of The Sidewalk Moving Pictures Festival), and more recently several feature films, including "Deal", starring Burt Reynolds, "The Shooting Gallery", starring Freddie Prinze Jr. and Ving Rhames, "Home Front" starring Academy Award winner Tatum O'Neal, and "New Orleans Mon Amour", starring Christopher Eccleston.

In 2006, following the devastation in New Orleans by Hurricane Katrina, Arata produced the first independent feature film ("Deal") in the city, and thereafter produced "New Orleans Mon Amour" (written and directed by Michael Almereyda), "Pool Boy" and "Autopsy" (with fellow producer Warren Zide). He recently produced the remake of the horror classic Night of the Demons as well as the action film The Courier with Jeffrey Dean Morgan, and served as Executive Producer of National Lampoon's "Dirty Movie" and "The Legend of Awesomest Maximus".

He got his producing start in theater, and had a successful run as chairman of Le Petit Theatre du Vieux Carre, the oldest operating theater in North America, which he returned to relevance and profitability in his three-year tenure.

== Filmography ==
- 2013: Another Dirty Movie as Lawyer
- 2013: Remember Sunday (TV Movie) as Mr. Zed
- 2012: The Courier as Uniformed Cop
- 2011: Ricochet (TV Movie) as Defense Attorney Adams
- 2011: Carjacked as Trucker
- 2011: The Pool Boys as Doug's Dad
- 2011: Love, Wedding, Marriage as Cheap Bastard
- 2011: Blood Out as Detective
- 2011: Lucky as Man with Piña Colada
- 2009: Night of the Demons as Louis Devereaux
- 2008: Deal as Passerby
- 2007: K-Ville as Lawyer / Owen's Lawyer
- 2006: A Perfect Day as Concerned Man
- 2006: Déjà Vu as Lawyer
- 2006 Life Is Not a Fairytale: The Fantasia Barrino Story (TV Movie) as Officer Kelvin
- 2006 Just My Luck as Truck Driver (uncredited)
- 2006 Glory Road as Sports Reporter
- 2006 In as Ronnie
- 2005 Shooting Gallery as Lawyer Type
- 2005 Faith of My Fathers as Captain Hart
- 2005 Odd Girl Out as Dave Larson
- 2005 At Last as Chris
- 2004 The Madam's Family: The Truth About the Canal Street Brothel (TV Movie) as Bobby
- 2004 The Brooke Ellison Story (TV Movie) as Paramedic
- 2004 The Dead Will Tell as Desk Sergeant
- 2004 Growing Pains: Return of the Seavers as Exterminator
- 2004 Torn Apart as Bingham
- 2004 Ray as Cop #4
- 2004 Miracle Run as Brian
- 2004 Infidelity (TV Movie) as Eric
- 2003 Runaway Jury as Raines

== Hurricane Katrina ==
Michael Arata lives and works in New Orleans. Following Hurricane Katrina he was appointed chairman of the Bring Back New Orleans Commission Film/Entertainment subcommittee, and drafted the City of New Orleans' request for federal assistance related to the area's film and entertainment industry. In 2002, he help draft the successful Louisiana Motion Picture Incentive Act, and was asked by Governor Murphy J. Foster, Jr. to testify before the Louisiana House and Senate in support of the legislation.

== Law career ==
He holds a J.D. degree from Tulane University, and regularly conducts seminars on entertainment law at Loyola University and Tulane University in New Orleans, as well as continuing legal education seminars for practicing lawyers.

== Criminal History ==
He was convicted of conspiracy, 7 counts of wire fraud, 1 count of mail fraud, and 3 counts of making false statements to the FBI as part of a scheme to cheat Louisiana's film tax credit program.

== Theatre ==
He was the youngest chairman of the Le Petit Theatre du Vieux Carre, a community theatre.

He formed Art A La Carte, Louisiana's only theatre for the disabled, and one of the nation's only fully accessible creative arts programs.
