= Joe Augustyn =

American screenwriter, film producer, and author

- Born: Joseph W. Augustyn; Port Richmond, Philadelphia, Pennsylvania, U.S.
- Education: Temple University
- Occupations: Film producer and screenwriter
- Years active: 1985- present

Joe Augustyn (born) is an American screenwriter, film producer, and author.

== Early life ==
Born in Philadelphia, Augustyn was the son of a factory worker and a hairdresser. Raised in the Port Richmond neighborhood of Philadelphia, Augustyn attended St. Adalbert's parochial grade school before attending the public magnet school Central High School. He was briefly married to writer-editor Victoria Brownworth.

He pursued painting and cartooning before attending Temple University where he studied film theory and production. As a college freshman he won a FOCUS Award in the film studies category for a paper analyzing the symbolism in the 1979 Francis Ford Coppola-directed film Apocalypse Now. The only undergrad among eleven winners, Augustyn was flown to Los Angeles for the ceremonies, and subsequently moved to Los Angeles to attend the AFI Conservatory for Advanced Film Studies as a producing-fellow. At his graduation review he was told by school director Tony Vellani that he held the record for the number of student productions he had worked on.

== Career ==
Following graduation from AFI he worked as an associate of Steve Golin and Joni Sighvatsson, who later went on to found Propaganda Films. After producing two features he retired from producing to focus exclusively on screenwriting, completing assignments for such companies as Tristar, Propaganda and countless indie producers. Augustyn's first feature, Night of the Demons, based on his original screenplay Halloween Party, was remade in 2008 by 7 Arts Productions, starring Shannon Elizabeth and Edward Furlong. Augustyn was not involved creatively in the remake and has pointed that out in interviews.

His second feature film as writer-producer was Night Angel. Based on Augustyn's original spec screenplay titled Lilith, it was the first feature film based on the ancient legend of the arch-succubus Lilith. With his health compromised by the stress of this production, Augustyn subsequently retired from producing to focus on writing.

His next produced screenplay was Night of the Demons 2 based on a story co-written with playwright James Penzi.

In 2001 Augustyn returned to Philadelphia to care for his elderly parents and after completing a few screenplay writing assignments and specs he began writing novels and short stories.

Augustyn's first novel, The Nine Lives of Felicia Miller, was published by Wildcat Press in 2012.

== Paranormal research ==
In 2014 he published Dead Rain: A Tale of the Zombie Apocalypse and Ghostwriter: The Polaroid Ghost & Other True Tales of the Paranormal, a non-fiction book of personal paranormal experiences including eyewitness accounts of events that took place in "the Wright House" (so named after the spirit that allegedly identified itself by name, writing on Polaroid film in ectoplasmic scrawl.) Augustyn was present at a Halloween party at which several guests who brought their own Polaroid cameras snapped remarkable photos. The case has been featured on several TV and cable shows including Sightings, My Ghost Story, Unexplained Mysteries, and Fact or Faked: Paranormal Files. Investigators from Fact or Faked: Paranormal Files attempted to debunk the ghostly Polaroids using carefully controlled experiments but instead claimed inexplicable results. Combined with voice stress analysis of the occupants of the house that indicated they were telling the truth, they declared the case authentic.

Actor and paranormal enthusiast Dan Aykroyd contributed a glowing introduction to Ghostwriter, calling it "an essential volume for any serious seeker in the understanding of the paranormal."

== Filmography ==
- Night of the Demons (1988 - also producer)
- Night Angel (1990 - also producer)
- Night of the Demons 2 (1994 co-written with James Penzi)
- Exit (1996)
