= Night of the Demons (1988 film) =

1988 film by Kevin S. Tenney

- Theatrical release poster
- Directed by: Kevin S. Tenney
- Written by: Joe Augustyn
- Produced by: Joe Augustyn
- Starring: Cathy Podewell; Amelia Kinkade; Linnea Quigley; Hal Havins; William Gallo; Alvin Alexis
- Cinematography: David Lewis
- Edited by: Daniel Duncan
- Music by: Dennis Michael Tenney
- Production companies: Paragon Arts International; Halloween Partners Ltd.; Meridian Pictures
- Distributed by: International Film Marketing
- Release date: September 9, 1988 (Detroit)
- Running time: 89 minutes
- Country: United States
- Language: English
- Box office: $3.1 million (US)

Night of the Demons is a 1988 American supernatural horror film directed by Kevin S. Tenney, written and produced by Joe Augustyn, and starring Amelia Kinkade, Cathy Podewell, Linnea Quigley, Hal Havins, and Alvin Alexis. The plot follows a group of high school students who throw a party inside an isolated funeral parlor on Halloween night. While attempting a séance, they accidentally release a demon locked in the crematorium that begins to possess them one by one.

Filmed in Los Angeles in 1987, Night of the Demons premiered in Detroit in September 1988, grossing $3.1 million at the box office. Though it received a mixed critical response, the film would later become a cult classic in the years since its release. It spawned a film series, as well as a 2009 remake of the same name.

== Plot ==
Teenage outcast Angela Franklin and her best friend Suzanne are throwing a party at Hull House, a mortuary abandoned due to its gruesome past and rumored to be cursed by evil spirits. On the way there, Stooge, Helen and Rodger drive past an elderly man who is carrying apples and razor blades. When Stooge taunts him by showing his buttocks out of the passenger window, the elderly man curses at them and says that "they'll get what they deserve".

Judy Cassidy and her boyfriend Jay Jansen pick up their friends, Max and Frannie, for the party. When they arrive, Judy's ex-boyfriend Sal Romero crashes the party. They start the party by dancing, but the radio dies out. Angela then holds a séance as a party game, but Helen screams when she sees a demon in the mirror foreshadowing her demise; and the mirror falls to the ground in pieces. The group suddenly hears thuds below them, and the demon frees itself from the crematorium it was sealed in to possess a distracted Suzanne. The group searches around the house, and the possessed Suzanne forcefully kisses Angela for the demon to manifest in her too.

When Judy discovers that Jay only invited her to have sex, he abandons her in a room only for her to be apparently locked in. Rodger and Helen find no exit outside, but as Helen disappears and the demons call out Rodger's name he locks himself in the car. Stooge wanders with Suzanne to find a bathroom and he gets locked outside, where her face transforms and she smashes a mirror before disappearing. A confused Stooge finds Angela seductively dancing in front of the fireplace and begins to dance with her, but when they kiss she possesses him as she bites off his tongue. Meanwhile, Jay wanders off to find Suzanne, with whom he has sex. During this, she reveals her inner demonic appearance to him and gouges his eyes. The possessed Stooge finds Max and Frannie having sex in a coffin and murders them both.

As Sal becomes horrified when he sees Angela putting her hands in the fire, Rodger (who had fallen asleep) is awoken from Helen's body crashing on the car. The two manage to free Judy, but are split up when the now openly demonic Angela chases after them. Hiding from Angela, Sal and Judy discover Suzanne with Jay's body before Sal is thrown out of a window. Judy escapes and she evades the demons throughout the house. When she attempts to climb down and Angela tries to kill her, Sal reemerges to fight her off and they both fall off the roof; with Sal impaled on a spike. Judy and Rodger are chased by the demons, and they lock themselves in the crematorium where they discover the truth of the demonic force. Just as Angela and Stooge break down the door, she uses a pipe funneling gas and ignites it to torch them which drives them away.

They escape upstairs and are cornered by the demons, including a burnt Angela and Stooge, and the demon possessed undead bodies of Suzanne, Jay, Max, Frannie, Helen and Sal. Rodger smashes through a window that leads them outside and they begin to climb up a wall by grabbing on the barbed wire around it, but the demons try to drag down Judy by her ankles. Rodger successfully pulls Judy up and they escape over the wall as the sun rises to destroy the possessed corpses and banish the demons back to hell. A severely shaken Judy and Rodger walk home together and they pass by the elderly man who watches them with contempt. He then enters his home to eat one of his wife's homemade pies for breakfast, only to realize too late she used the apples that he placed the razor blades in which he intended to use on Trick-or-Treaters. The blades graphically slice through his throat, killing him; his wife then casually approaches his dead body to kiss his head, saying "Happy Halloween, dear."

== Cast ==
- Cathy Podewell as Judy Cassidy
- Amelia Kinkade as Angela Franklin
- William Gallo as Sal Romero
- Alvin Alexis as Rodger
- Linnea Quigley as Suzanne
- Lance Fenton as Jay Jansen
- Hal Havins as "Stooge"
- Allison Barron as Helen
- Philip Tanzini as Max
- Jill Terashita as Frannie
- Harold Ayer as Old Man
- Marie Denn as Old Man's Wife
- Karen Ericson as Mrs. Cassidy
- Donnie Jeffcoat, Jr as Billy
- James W. Quinn as Clerk #1 / Demon Voices
- Clark Jarrett as Clerk #2

== Production ==
Filming began in Los Angeles, California on April 8, 1987, under the working title Halloween Party.

== Release ==
The film was picked up for theatrical release by Paragon Arts International. Rather than a nationwide release, it was released regionally; the film debuted in the Detroit market on September 9, 1988 and went throughout the country until June 1989, grossing a total of $3,109,904.

=== Home media ===
Republic Pictures purchased the VHS home video rights for the film in May 1989. Anchor Bay Entertainment released it to DVD in 2004; Scream Factory (under license from current rights-holder MGM) released a Blu-ray/DVD combo pack collector's edition on February 4, 2014.

== Reception ==
=== Critical response ===
On the review aggregator website Rotten Tomatoes, Night of the Demons holds a 56% approval rating, based on 16 critic reviews, with an average rating of 5.7/10. The Washington Post criticized the film as "a convergence of stereotypes ... and cliche's". The New York Times reported that "the cleverest thing about Night of the Demons is its advertising campaign" and that it "is stupid; it is sexist; at 89 minutes it feels unforgivably long".

Cinematical wrote that "while not particularly original, Tenney's film is definitely entertaining if you're into the whole 'teens wander into an isolated locale and die horrible deaths' subgenre of horror". HorrorNews.net called Night of the Demons one of the 80's great legacies in horror". DVD Talk praised the film's 2004 DVD release, but stated that the director and producer commentary was "seemingly stodgy". Dread Central called the film fun and lively. Bloody Disgusting praised the film's DVD release, calling it "the perfect DVD for all fans of this lost era: 'The Eighties Horror Film'". W. Scott Poole of PopMatters called it "truly original" and wrote that the film blends elements of slasher films and zombie films.

== Franchise ==
=== Sequels ===
Night of the Demons was followed by two sequels, with Joe Augustyn co-writing the first sequel, and Tenney writing the third film.

=== Remake ===
In 2009, a remake was released, with Tenney serving as co-producer.

== See also ==
- List of films set around Halloween
