= Night of the Demons (2009 film) =

- Theatrical teaser poster
- Directed by: Adam Gierasch
- Screenplay by: Adam Gierasch; Jace Anderson
- Based on: Night of the Demons by Joe Augustyn
- Produced by: Greg McKay; Kevin S. Tenney; Michael Arata
- Starring: Shannon Elizabeth; Monica Keena; Diora Baird; Michael Copon; Bobbi Sue Luther; John F. Beach; Edward Furlong
- Cinematography: Yaron Levy
- Edited by: Andrew Cohen, A.C.E.
- Music by: Joseph Bishara
- Production company: Parallel Media
- Distributed by: Seven Arts Pictures (United States); Seven Arts International (International)
- Release dates: August 30, 2009 (FrightFest); October 19, 2010 (United States)
- Running time: 93 minutes
- Country: United States
- Language: English
- Budget: $10 million
- Box office: $64,040

Night of the Demons is a 2009 American horror film and remake of the 1988 film of the same name. It was directed by Adam Gierasch, who also co-wrote the screenplay with Jace Anderson, and stars Edward Furlong, Monica Keena, Bobbi Sue Luther, Shannon Elizabeth, Diora Baird, and Michael Copon.

== Plot ==
In 1925, Evangeline Broussard hosts an evening gathering hoping to catch the eye of her crush Louis, who is into black magic. At a séance, a group of demons are summoned and state that they need seven human sacrifices to rise again. Frightened by this, Evangeline prepares to hang herself from her balcony to stop their plans. Louis attempts to stop her, but she jumps, decapitating herself in the process. Louis stares over the balcony as his eyes become demonic.

In the present, Maddie and her friends Lily and Suzanne attend a party held by Angela Feld. Also attending are Maddie's drug dealing ex-boyfriend Colin, Lily's ex-boyfriend Dex, and Dex's friend Jason. At the party, Angela prompts everyone to go wild, as she must make money off the party to avoid living on the streets. Lily and Dex eventually reunite while Suzanne becomes incredibly drunk. When Maddie goes to the bathroom, a hand grabs her through the mirror, with the others dismissing it off as an elaborate trick placed by Angela.

Eventually police officers arrive and break up the party, leaving an upset Angela alone in the house. Maddie, Lily, Dex and Jason soon return to find Suzanne, who has passed out. Colin and Angela go into the basement to find the drugs he had hid earlier. They discover a hidden door, and Angela remarks that the house is full of hidden rooms, including a tunnel that leads to the next estate over. They enter the room and find six skeletons, whom Angela believes are the remains of the missing party guests of Evangeline Broussard. One of the skeletons bites Angela's hand. Colin attempts to leave the house, only to discover that the gate is locked. While everyone plans to wait the night out, Suzanne tells the group the story of the night that led to Evangeline and her friends' deaths. The only person found alive was the maid, who was found scribbling spells on her walls, having been driven insane by the night's events.

Angela slowly succumbs to the skeleton bite and turns into a demon. She returns to the group and infects Dex by kissing him, who in turn infects Lily. While Maddie, Jason, and Colin leave to find another exit, Angela seduces Suzanne and turns her into a demon. Jason finds a demonic Lily and goes to warn the others. They are initially skeptical until a demonic Suzanne attacks them. They decide to escape through the tunnel, only to discover it has caved. The group is then attacked by Lily and Dex as Jason is injured. The survivors run upstairs and tend to Jason's injury and realize they are in the maid's room with the symbols she drew still on the walls, acting as a ward against the demons. They discover that the demons were thrown out of hell for trying to usurp Satan's rule and need seven human vessels to be free. The demons had tricked Evangeline into hosting the party so they could take over the guests, but failed after she hanged herself, as they cannot possess corpses.

Soon the walls begin pouring with blood and wash the spells away. The trio attempts to re-draw the spells but is lured out of the room when the demons fake daylight in the windows. Maddie and Colin rush back to the room, while Jason is caught and disemboweled by Angela, coming back to life as a demon. As they plan to wait in the room until sunrise, Colin falls through the floorboards into the basement. Maddie attempts to help him, but he is revealed to now be a demon. Maddie manages to get back to the maid's room and fights the demons off. She makes her way to the balcony, where she ties a rope around her neck and jumps over, seemingly hanging herself. As the sun rises, the demons are killed. Maddie reveals that she only pretended to hang herself, having tied the rope around her waist and the demons merely assumed that she was dead. Maddie is then able to exit through the gates to her freedom.

== Cast ==
- Shannon Elizabeth as Angela Feld
- Monica Keena as Maddie Curtis
- Diora Baird as Lily Thompson
- Michael Copon as Dex Thrilby
- Bobbi Sue Luther as Suzanne Reed
- John F. Beach as Jason Rogers
- Edward Furlong as Colin Levy
- Tiffany Shepis as Diana
- Jamie Harris as Nigel
- Linnea Quigley (cameo) as Ballerina

== Production ==
Principal photography took place in New Orleans in October 2008. There are several differences between the original and the remake, with the most notable being the change in location as well as an updated plot. Linnea Quigley, who starred in the original film as Suzanne, has a cameo in this film. The special effects and FX effects were created by Drac Studios.

== Soundtrack ==
1. "Night of the Demons" – 45 Grave
2. "Ghastly Stomp" – Ghastly Ones
3. "Boris Karloff" – The Barbarellatones
4. "Aim for the Head" – Creature Feature
5. "No Costume, No Candy" – The Swingin' Neckbreakers
6. "Incredible Two Headed Transplant" – Haunted Garage
7. "The World Belongs to You" – The Death Riders
8. "Bloodletting (The Vampire Song)" – Concrete Blonde
9. "Blood, Brains & Rock 'N' Roll" – Zombie Girl
10. "Code Blue" – T.S.O.L.
11. "Legions of the Damned" – DeadbyDay
12. "Gimme Gimme Bloodshed" – Wednesday 13
13. "Invasion of the Ball Snatchers" – Psycho Charger
14. "Black Lung" – Frankenstein
15. "Black No. 1" – Type O Negative
16. "Reckoning of the Soul Made Godless" – Goatwhore

== Release ==
The film originally premiered at the London FrightFest Film Festival in August 2009, with plans to release it in October of the same year, but the film was pushed back for a tentative release date for September 23, 2010.

Night of the Demons was released straight-to-DVD and Blu-ray on October 19, 2010, as opposed to a theatrical release. The release contains extras such as an audio commentary with the film crew, a documentary about the making of the film, and a Comic-Con appearance.

== Reception ==
Critical reception has been mostly negative, with review aggregator Rotten Tomatoes rating the film at 38% "rotten" based upon 16 reviews.

Dread Central gave a mixed review for the remake and gave it 3 1/2 blades out of 5: "It's brash, loud and sexy but a few too obvious flaws unfortunately knock the film down a peg. In the end it's still a fun ride...and certainly worth a watch on an evening when you'd rather disengage the brain and sink a few drinks than deal with anything more cerebral". Fright Fest director and founder Alan Jones commented that the audience response in general was noted to be positive for the film. The film received a very limited theatrical release, grossing $64,000 against a $10 million budget before its direct-to-video premiere.

== Future ==
In June 2013, Tenney announced plans to create a sequel to the 2009 film, entitled After Party. Gierasch did not return as director, and Anthony Hickox was attached to direct the film. A Kickstarter campaign was launched with a goal of $250,000 but was unsuccessful.

The projected plot for After Party was to center on the character of Diana, one of Angela's former friends and associates, who would hold a party in the same mansion and become possessed by the now-demonic Angela.

== See also ==
- List of films set around Halloween
