= Shannon Elizabeth =

American actress and activist (born 1973)

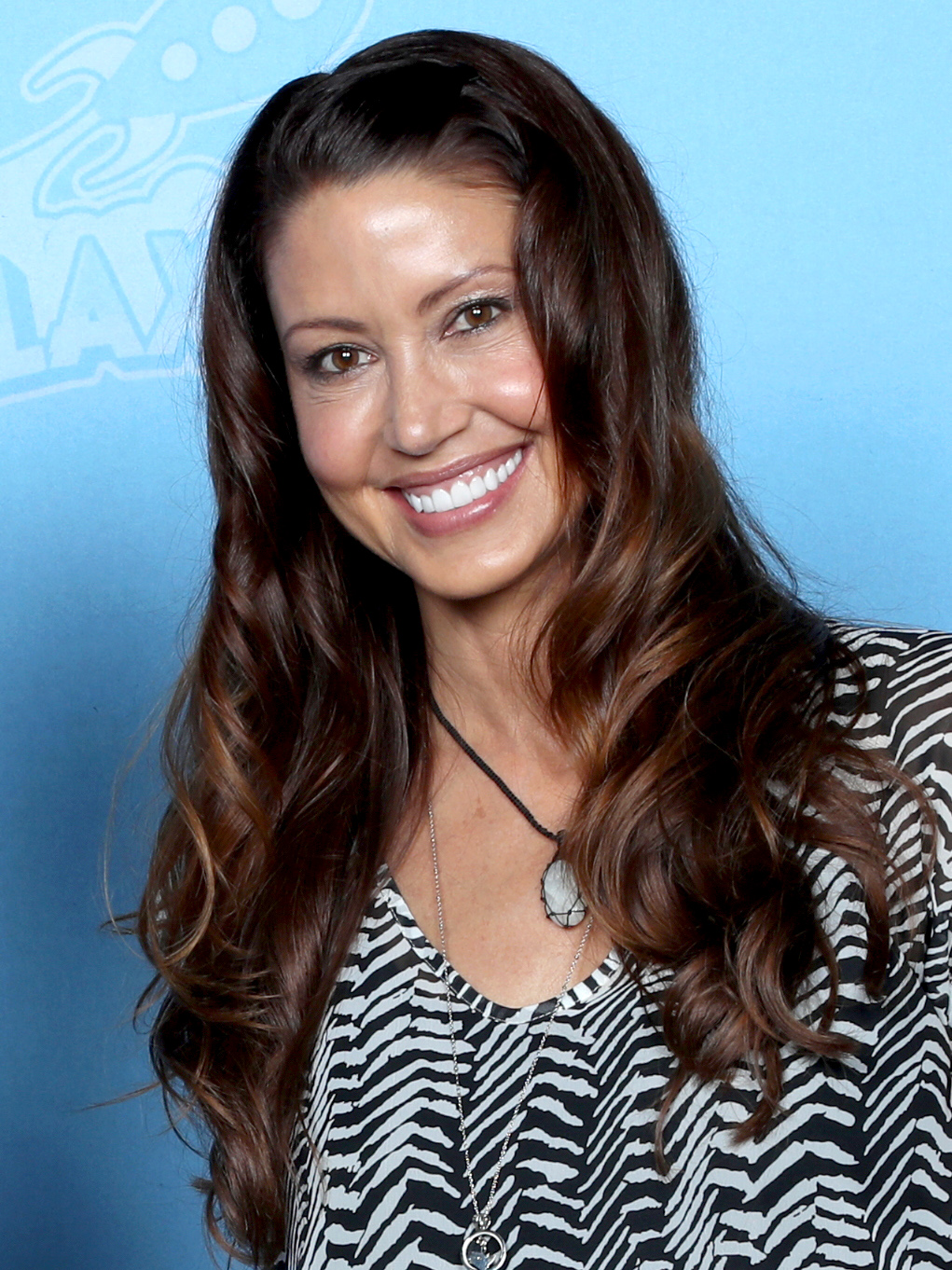
- Elizabeth in 2021
- Born: Shannon Elizabeth Fadal; September 7, 1973 (age 53); Houston, Texas, U.S.
- Occupations: Actress; activist; poker player
- Years active: 1991–present
- Spouses: Joseph D. Reitman (m. 2002; div. 2005) Simon Borchert (m. 2021; div. 2026)
- Relatives: Tamsen Fadal (cousin)

Shannon Elizabeth Fadal (born September 7, 1973) is an American actress, activist, and poker player. Her roles in the Scary Movie (2000) and the American Pie film series (1999–2001; 2012) solidified her status as a sex symbol of the 1990s and 2000s.

Elizabeth's film credits include Tomcats (2001), Jay and Silent Bob Strike Back (2001), Thirteen Ghosts (2001), Cursed (2005), and Night of the Demons (2009), and supporting roles in Love Actually (2003), The Grand (2007), Jay and Silent Bob Reboot (2019), and Plan B (2024). In television, she had a recurring role in the Fox sitcom That '70s Show (2003–2005) and a main role in the UPN sitcom Cuts (2005–2006).

Elizabeth is a professional poker player, and in 2006 was named "one of the leading celebrity poker players." She is also noted for her activism.

== Early life ==
Elizabeth was born Shannon Elizabeth Fadal in Houston, Texas, to a father of Syrian-Lebanese ancestry, and to a mother of German, English and Irish ancestry. She was raised in Waco, Texas, from 3rd grade through high school; Elizabeth graduated from Waco High School in 1991. In high school, she was a member of the tennis team and at one point considered a professional tennis career. Elizabeth worked as a model for Ford and Elite models before she began a career in film.

== Career ==
Elizabeth appeared in several films and television shows before being cast in 1999's American Pie in the role of Nadia. It was a major box office success, and she reprised her role in American Pie 2 (2001) and American Reunion (2012). Elizabeth subsequently appeared in several Hollywood films, including Scary Movie (2000), Jay and Silent Bob Strike Back (2001), Tomcats (2001), Thirteen Ghosts (2001), Love Actually (2003), Cursed (2005), The Grand (2007), and Night of the Demons (2009). Elizabeth starred in the UPN series Cuts until the show was canceled in May 2006. Elizabeth also recurred in That '70s Show for a number of episodes.

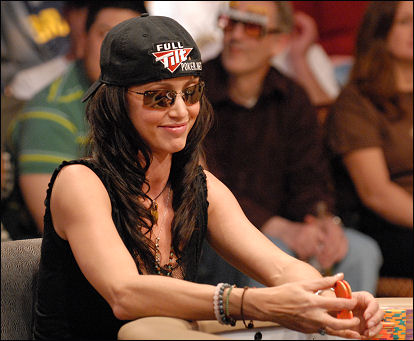
Elizabeth at the 2007 NBC National Heads-Up Poker Championship

In 2000 and 2003, she was featured in Maxim. In June 2008, she was Maxim's cover girl. She provided the likeness and voice for Serena St. Germaine in the 2004 video game James Bond 007: Everything or Nothing. Elizabeth was one of the celebrities on an episode of NBC's Thank God You're Here along with Tom Green, Chelsea Handler, and George Takei. Elizabeth was among the cast of the sixth season of Dancing with the Stars, partnered with Derek Hough. Elizabeth was the seventh star eliminated from the competition.

In 2006, Elizabeth described poker as her second career and was called "one of the leading celebrity poker players." At that time, she visited the Las Vegas Valley up to three times each month to participate in poker games with top players. Elizabeth does not appear to have been as active a poker player since scoring 12 tournament cashes from 2006 through 2010 – she has only one tournament cash (in 2013) thereafter.

Elizabeth played in the Main Event of the 2005 World Series of Poker under the guidance of Daniel Negreanu, and won a special tournament celebrating the opening of a new poker room at Caesars Palace hotel in January 2006, beating out 83 celebrities and poker professionals to win $55,000. She also cashed four times in the World Series of Poker in 2006 and 2007, but again busted out of the Main Event early. In 2007, she advanced to the semi-finals of the NBC National Heads-Up Poker Championship in a field consisting of the top poker professionals before losing to eventual champion Paul Wasicka.

Elizabeth was the host of the comedy/burlesque series Live Nude Comedy in 2009. Elizabeth also featured in Chris Brown's "Next to You" music video as Brown's girlfriend in 2011. In 2019, she reprised her role as Justice in the Jay and Silent Bob Reboot. In 2022, it was announced that Elizabeth would star in the comedy film Plan B alongside Jon Heder, Jamie Lee and Tom Berenger.

== Philanthropy ==
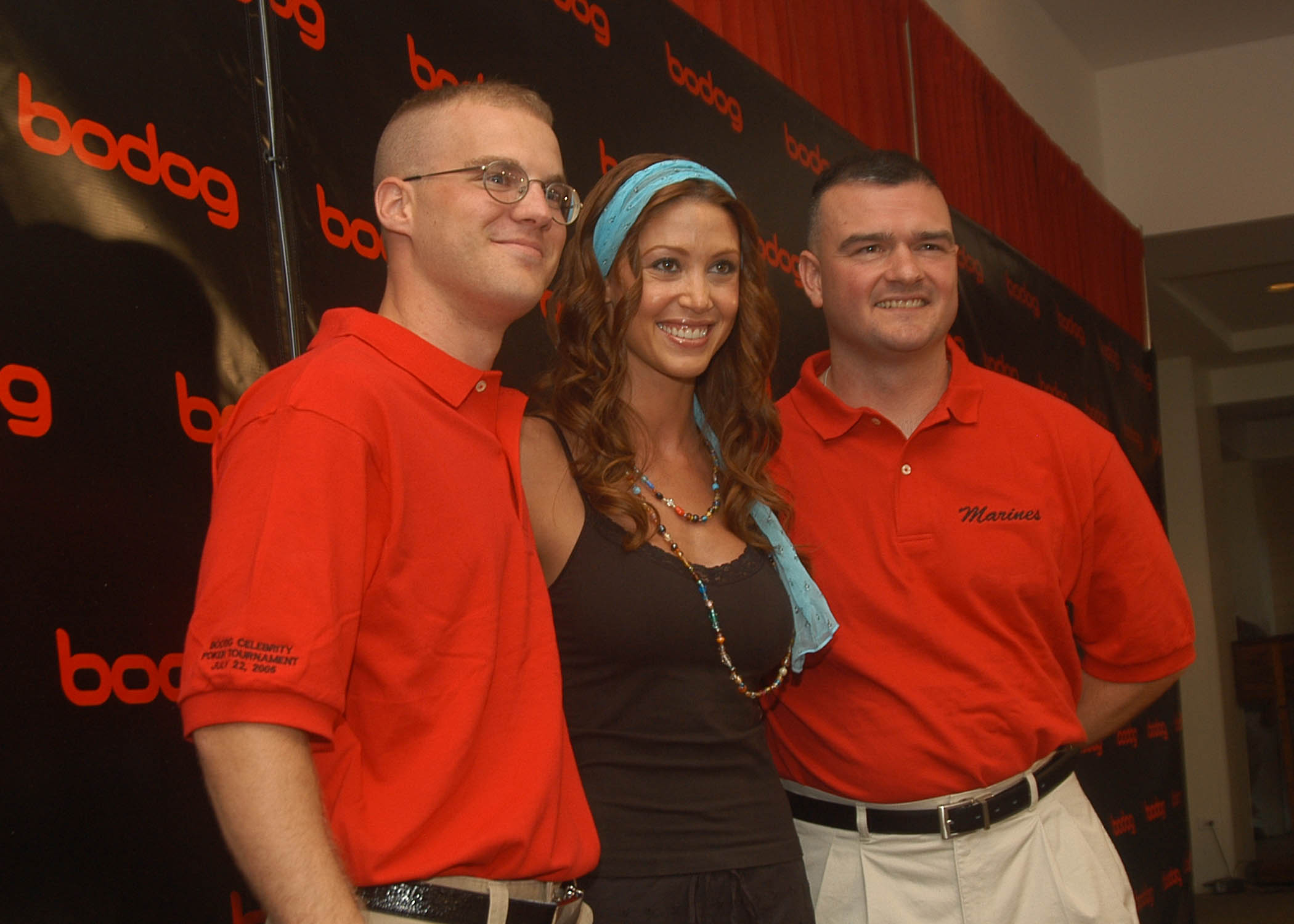
Elizabeth along with two United States Marine Corps participants of the poker tournament, prior to 2006 tribute troops of the U.S. Military

Animal Avengers, a non-profit animal rescue organization founded by Elizabeth and her then-husband Joseph D. Reitman, is dedicated to rescuing and finding a home for homeless pets, reducing pet overpopulation, promoting responsible pet guardianship and preventing animal cruelty.

Among many fundraising events, Team Bodog raised over $50,000 for Animal Avengers in a celebrity poker night on October 8, 2005. The event was hosted by tournament director Matt Savage. In 2016, she began participating in numerous other Bodog-sponsored charity events as well. The organization, based in Brazil, lead 3D printing of prosthetic body parts for animals, including a beak for goose Victoria.

Elizabeth has served as the spokesperson for Farm Sanctuary's Adopt a Turkey program, urging people to adopt a turkey instead of eating one for Thanksgiving. She uses social media, particularly Instagram posts, to raise awareness about rhino poaching at the Poached Rhino fundraiser.

== Personal life ==
Elizabeth is an environmentalist and a vegan. She is a cousin of New York-based television host and relationship coach Tamsen Fadal.

She was married to actor Joseph D. Reitman from 2002 to 2005. She later married Simon Borchert in 2021. In 2026, she announced that she separated from Borchert in 2025, and filed for divorce, which was finalized in May 2026.

== Filmography ==
=== Film ===
Year	Title	Role	Notes
1997	Blast	Hostage	
1997	Jack Frost	Jill Metzner	Video
1998	Blade Squad	Nurse	TV movie
1999	Seamless: Kidz Rule	Nicole	
1999	Dying to Live	Vanessa Canningham	TV movie
1999	American Pie	Nadia	
1999	Evicted	Princess	
2000	Scary Movie	Buffy Gilmore	
2000	Dish Dogs	Anne	Video
2001	Tomcats	Natalie Parker	
2001	American Pie 2	Nadia	
2001	Jay and Silent Bob Strike Back	Justice Faulken	
2001	Thirteen Ghosts	Kathy Kriticos	
2002	Survivin' the Island	Office Worker	Short
2003	The Crooked E: The Unshredded Truth About Enron	Courtney	TV movie
2003	Love Actually	Harriet	
2004	Johnson Family Vacation	Chrishelle Rene Boudreau	
2005	Cursed	Becky Morton	
2005	Confessions of an American Bride	Sam	TV movie
2005	The Kid & I	Shelby Roman	
2007	The Grand	Toni	
2008	Deal	Michelle	
2008	You Belong to Me	Alex Wilson	TV movie
2009	Night of the Demons	Angela Feld	
2011	A Novel Romance	Adi Schwartz	
2012	American Reunion	Nadia	
2012	A Green Story	Kelly	
2012	Golden Winter	Jessica Richmond	
2013	In the Dark	Linda	TV movie
2013	Catch a Christmas Star	Nikki Crandon	TV movie
2014	The Outsider	Margo	
2015	Marshall's Miracle	Cynthia Lawson	
2016	Swing Away	Zoe Papadopoulos	
2016	Gibby	Ms. Martin	
2016	The Opera Singer	Young Opera Singer	Short
2019	Jay and Silent Bob Reboot	Justice Faulken	
2020	Playing With Beethoven	Bryn	
2023	Death on the Border	Maddy	
2023	A Home for the Holidays	Ella	
2024	Plan B	Anne McNally	
TBA	First Witch	Mari	

=== Television ===
Year	Title	Role	Notes
1996	Arliss	Anya Slovachek	Episode: "Crossing the Line"
1996	Hang Time	Nicole Barrett	Episode: "Green-Eyed Julie"
1997	USA High	Melanie	Episode: "Internet Love Story"
1997	Step by Step	Cindi	Episode: "Can't Buy Me Love"
1998	Pacific Blue	Jo	Episode: "Damaged Goods"
1999	G vs E	Cherry Valence	Episode: "Men Are from Mars, Women Are Evil"
2000	TFI Friday	Herself	Episode: "Episode #5.25"
2000	MTV Rock 'N' Jock Bowling Bash	Herself/Co-Host	Main Co-Host
2001	Celebrity Adventures	Herself	Episode: "Ruins of Greece"
2001	Who Wants to Be a Millionaire	Herself/Contestant	Episode: "Celebrity Edition 4, Show 1 & 2"
2001	Comedy Central Canned Ham	Herself	Episode: "Jay and Silent Bob Strike Back"
2002	The Hollywood Machine	Herself	Episode: "The Battle of the Blockbusters"
2002	VH-1 Behind the Movie	Herself	Episode: "American Pie"
2002	Just Shoot Me!	Karen	Episode: "About a Boy"
2002	Off Centre	Dawn	Episode: "Addicted to Love"
2002	The Twilight Zone	Sondra Lomax	Episode: "Dream Lover"
2003	The Greatest	Herself/Host	Episode: "50 Sexiest Video Moments"
2003	MTV Icon	Herself	Episode: "Metallica"
2003	MTV Cribs	Herself	Episode: "Rachel Hunter, Shannon Elizabeth, Sam Madison"
2003	The Bronx Bunny Show	Herself	Episode: "Episode #1.10"
2003–04	Celebrity Poker Showdown	Herself	Recurring Guest
2003–05	That '70s Show	Brooke Rockwell	Recurring Cast: Season 6, Guest: Season 7
2004	Beat Seekers	Herself	Episode: "Episode #2.18"
2004	Punk'd	Herself	Episode: "Carmelo Anthony, Shannon Elizabeth, Jena Malone"
2004	Celebrity Blackjack	Herself	Recurring Guest
2004	One on One	Tiffany Sherwood	Episode: "Splitting Hairs"
2005	E! Hollywood Hold'em	Herself	Episode: "Shannon Elizabeth"
2005	Mad TV	Herself	Episode: "OK Go"
2005	Living with Fran	Heather	Episode: "Riley's Ex"
2005	King of the Hill	Candee (voice)	Episode: "Harlottown"
2005–06	Cuts	Tiffany Sherwood	Main Cast
2007	Thank God You're Here	Herself	Episode: "Episode #1.4"
2007	Dancing with the Stars	Herself/Contestant	Contestant: Season 6
2009	Live Nude Comedy	Herself/Host	Main Host
2012	Ordinary People, Extraordinary Lives	Herself	Episode: "A Place Called Home"
2012	TMI Hollywood	Herself/Host	Episode: "American Sketches"
2013	Melissa & Joey	Anita	Episode: "The Unfriending"
2014	Shark Cage	Herself	Episode: "Heat 4"
2018	Celebrity Big Brother	Herself/Contestant	Contestant: Season 1
2026	Fox News Saturday Night with Jimmy Failla	Herself/Panelist	Episode: "Episode #4.25"

=== Music Videos ===
Year	Artist	Song	Role
2000	Enrique Iglesias	"Be with You"	Love Interest
2011	Chris Brown featuring Justin Bieber	"Next to You"	Herself

=== Video games ===
Year	Title	Role	Notes
2004	James Bond 007: Everything or Nothing	Serena St. Germaine	Voice
2009	Leisure Suit Larry: Box Office Bust	Amy Loveheart	Voice

=== Dancing with the Stars ===
Week #	Dance / Song	Judge's scores			Result	Ref
Week #	Dance / Song	Inaba	Goodman	Tonioli	Result	Ref
1	Cha-Cha-Cha / "Shut Up and Drive"	7	7	7	No Elimination	
2	Quickstep / "Swing With Me"	8	8	8	Safe	
3	Jive / "Goody Two Shoes"	8	8	8	Safe	
4	Viennese Waltz / "Keep Holding On"	9	10	9	Safe	
5	Samba / "Pon de Replay"	8	8	7	Safe	
6	Rumba / "True Colors"; Group Country Western / "Cotton Eyed Joe"	8 No	8 Scores	8 Given	Safe	
7	Tango / "Tanguedia II"; Mambo / "Ain't Nothing Wrong with That"	9; 8	9; 8	9; 8	Eliminated	

== Awards and nominations ==
Year	Award	Category	Nominated work	Result
2000	MTV Movie & TV Awards	Best Breakthrough Performance	American Pie	Nominated
2000	Young Hollywood Awards	Best Ensemble Cast	American Pie	Won
2001	Hollywood Film Awards	Breakthrough Female Performance	American Pie 2	Won
2001	Stinkers Bad Movie Awards	Worst Supporting Actress	American Pie 2	Nominated
2001	Stinkers Bad Movie Awards	Most Annoying Fake Accent – Female	American Pie 2	Nominated
2004	Phoenix Film Critics Society Awards	Best Ensemble	Love Actually	Nominated
2011	New York International Independent Film & Video Festival	Best Actress	A Novel Romance	Won
