= Witch board =

Witch Board or Witchboard may refer to:

- Ouija, a board and movable planchette for attempting paranormal communication, such as at a séance
- Witchboard, a North American horror film franchise
  - Witchboard, a 1986 American horror film
  - Witchboard 2: The Devil's Doorway, a 1993 American horror film
  - Witchboard III: The Possession, a 1995 Canadian horror film
  - Witchboard (2024 film), an American horror film
- Witch Board Museum, located in Salem, Massachusetts, or its secondary location in Baltimore, Maryland

== See also ==
- Witch (disambiguation)
- Board (disambiguation)
