= Witch trials in France =

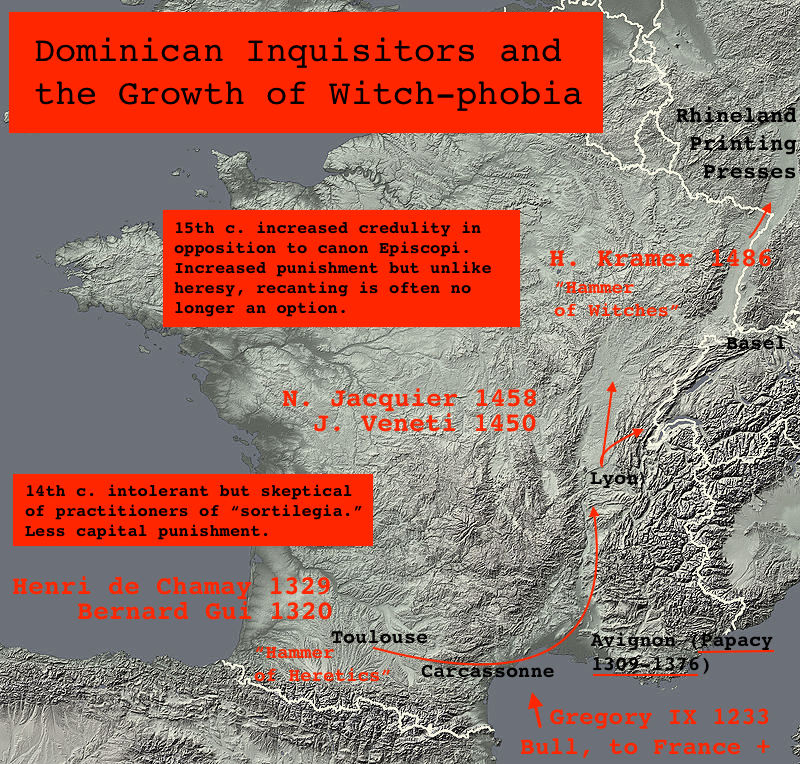
Dominican Inquisitors and the Growth of Witch-phobia

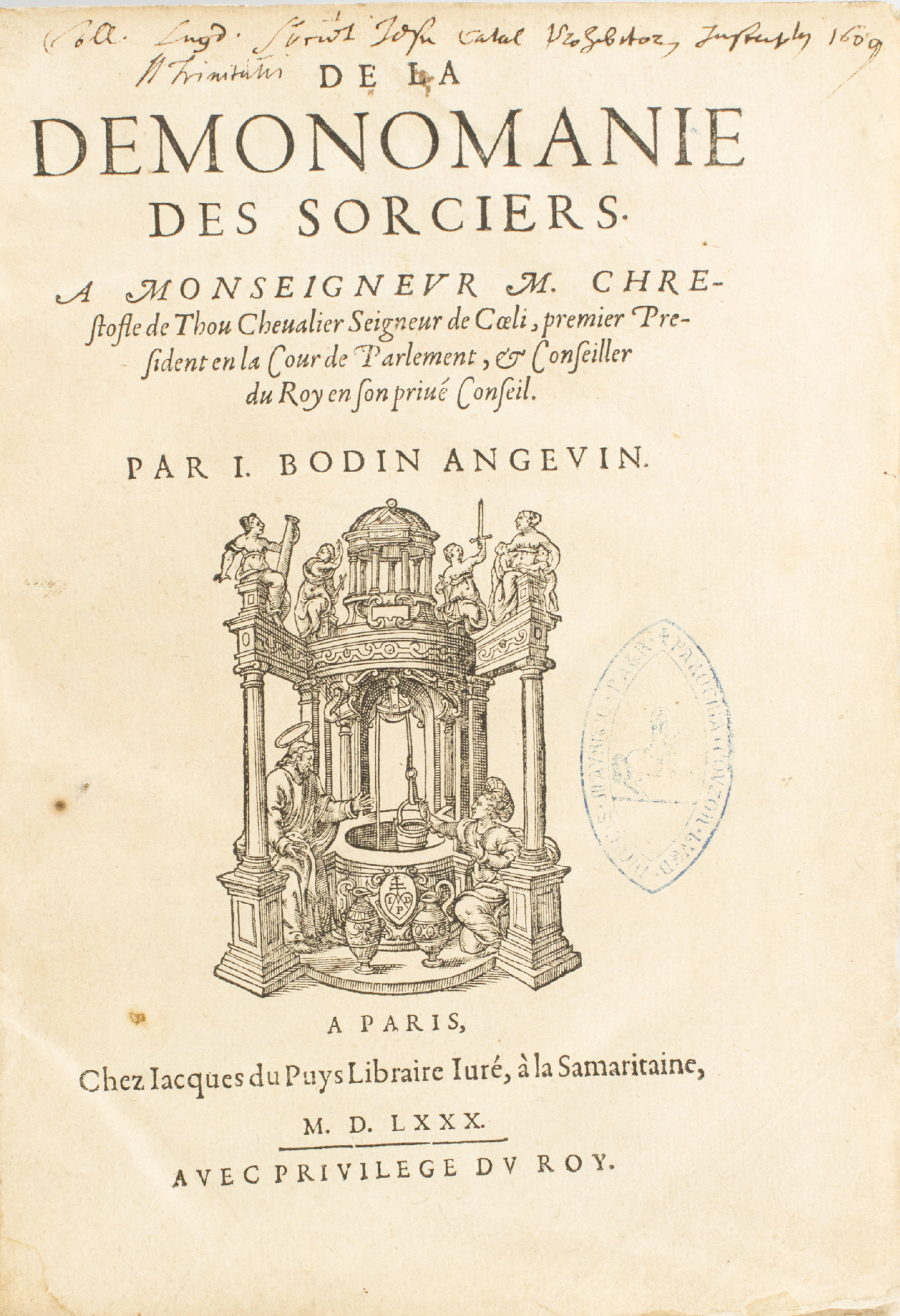
Title page of De la démonomanie des sorciers (1580)

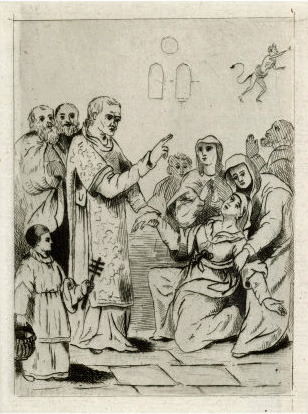
Exorcism of Magdelaine Bavent during the Louviers possessions

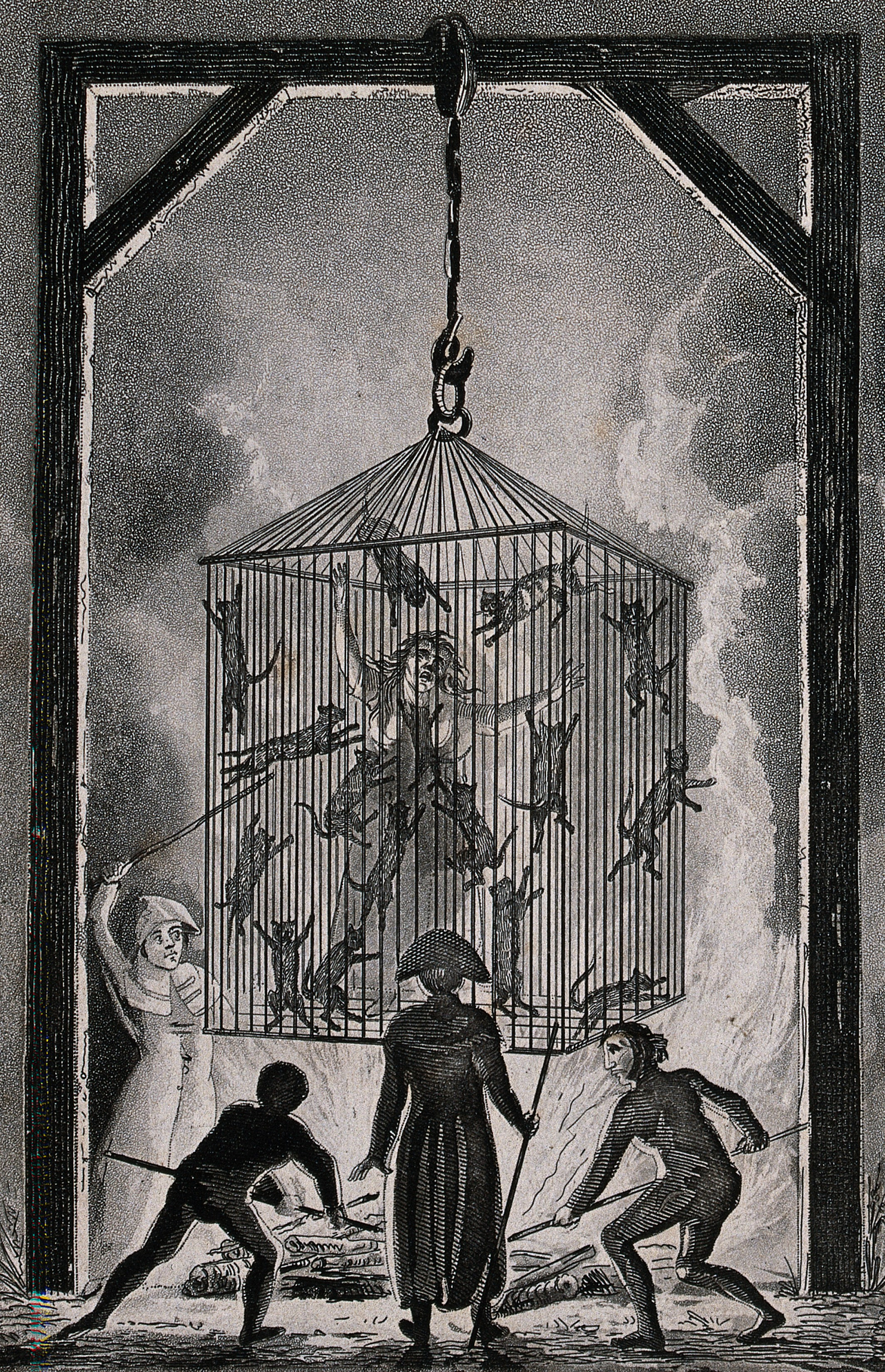
The burning of a French midwife in a cage filled with black cats

The Witch trials in France are poorly documented, mainly because a lot of the documents of former witch trials have not been preserved, and no number can therefore be given for the executions of witch trials in France or the true extent of them. While there is much secondary information about witch trials in France, the poor state of documentation often makes them hard to confirm.

As no national Witchcraft Act was enacted in France, they fell under the jurisdiction of local courts and the witch hunt differed between regions. The witch trials of Northern France fell under the jurisdiction of the Parlement of Paris, which was normally not liberal in enforcing the death penalty. However, the local courts did not always defer to Paris, which is another contributing factor to the difficulty in estimating the witch hunt in France. Present day North Eastern France is known to have experienced a severe witch hunt, close to the border of the territories of the Catholic Prince Bishops as it was, but at that point this, part of France belonged to the Holy Roman Empire.

== History ==
The first witch trial believed to be held at Le Châtelet in Paris, in 1390, ended with the execution of Jeanne de Brigue. During the first half of the 16th century, a few cases of witch trials are noted to have taken place in France. In 1539 a witch trial resulted in four executions in Beaujolais; in 1553 a "Faustian magician" was executed in Poitiers; and in 1558 and 1562 witch trials were conducted in Nevers and Toulouse respectively both of which resulted in three executions.

In France, no national witchcraft law was introduced, and the procedure of such a trial was therefore up to the local court and judge to decide. The book Demonomanie by Jean Bodin, which was published in 1578, was to have a great impact upon the witch trials in France.

=== Northern France ===
Northern France was under the jurisdiction of the Parlement of Paris, and all sentences of local witchcraft trials therefore fell under its jurisdiction. This proved to have an inhibiting effect on witch trials in Northern France. Between 1568 and 1625, the Parlement of Paris only confirmed one hundred death sentences for witchcraft and thus confirmed less than five percent of the cases from local courts which were put before it.

The Parlement of Paris refused to follow the example of other countries and make witchcraft an "Exceptional Crime". In 1588, the Parliament issued regulations to prevent what they termed as "excessive" zeal and exaggerations in witchcraft persecutions. However, it is known that local courts ignored the recommendations of the Parlement of Paris, and the number of local witchcraft sentences which were never reported or appealed to Paris, is unknown or unconfirmed.

In 1624, a new law required all sentences made by a local court in Northern France to be confirmed by the Parlement of Paris before they could be carried out. With one exception, the Parlement of Paris stopped confirming death sentenced for witchcraft after 1625. However, local witch trials who did not report their cases to be confirmed by Paris would still go undetected.

=== North East France ===
The North East of present-day France, particularly Lorraine and Franche-Comté (at that time a part of the Holy Roman Empire), was an area strongly affected by witch hunt. About 800 witch trials took place in these areas with numerous executions in the period of 1603-1614 and 1627-1632, and again in France-Comté with 100 executions in 1658-1661.

=== Southern France ===
Southern France was not under the jurisdiction of the Parlement of Paris, and a number of large witch trials were conducted there during the first half of the 17th century, among them being the famous Labourd witch-hunt of 1609 and the Aix-en-Provence possessions (1611).

=== End of witch trials ===
Peronne Goguillon has been referred to as the last woman to be executed for witchcraft in France in 1678. There have been different opinions as to whether the Affair of the Poisons (1679–1682) should be defined a witch trial or not. While the accused of the Affair de Poisons had indeed positioned themselves as professional witches, they were prosecuted and executed for poison and murder rather than for witchcraft.

The 1682 Edict of Louis XIV described witchcraft as fraudulent magic, a definition which did not as such prevent witch trials, but made it more difficult to convict people of witchcraft.

A few witch trials were conducted in France during the 18th century, some of which resulted in death sentences for men. The execution of an alleged male sorcerer in Bordeaux in 1718 has traditionally been referred to as the last. However, a donkey-driver was in fact executed for this crime in Paris in 1724.

The last witch trial resulting in an execution in France was likely that of Louis Debaraz, who was executed in Lyon in 1745. He was executed as the last of several men implicated in the Lyon witch trials in 1743–1745, in which several men were charged with making a Devil's pact in order to find hidden treasures, following the case of Bertrand Guilladot. As late as 1768, a woman was tried and convicted of witchcraft in France, but she was only given a fine.

== See also ==
- Witch trials in the early modern period
