= Normandy witch trials =

Witch trials in Normandy, France (1669–1670)

The Normandy witch trials of 1669–1670, which took place in the province of Normandy in France, belong to the most famed of French witch hunts. In parallel with the witch trials of Guyenne and Bearn in 1670–72, it was one of the two last great witch hunts in France. It has an important role in the history of French witch trials, because together with the witch trials of Guyenne and Bearn, it resulted in an intervention from King Louis XIV, who stopped them, and introduced an edict designed to limit the persecution of witchcraft in France.

== Background ==
The province of Normandy were under the jurisdiction of the Parlement of Rouen, which were much more severe than the Parlement of Paris in its attitude toward witchcraft. In contrast to the Parlement of Paris, which often refused to confirm death sentences for witchcraft and therefore restricted witchcraft persecution under its domains, the situation was reversed in Normandy, were Parlement of Rouen normally confirmed all death sentences for witchcraft. In contrast to the rest of France, the majority of witches in Normandy - two thirds - were male, often shepherds.

== Witch trials of 1669-1670 ==
In 1669, a particularly large witch hunt took place in Normandy. It was caused by professional witch hunters, with the support of the Parlement of Rouen. In 1670, twelve death sentences were confirmed by the Parlement of Rouen. Another 24 death sentences were awaiting confirmation from the Parlement of Rouen, when the families of the 12 condemned appealed for royal pardon. King Louis XIV, who wished to curb the independence of the local parlements and strengthen royal central power, issued a pardon and transformed all of the death sentences to banishment, as well as restored their confiscated property, all under the opposition of the Parlement of Rouen. This stopped the witch hunt in Normandy. In 1672, only two years later, Louis XIV again stopped another large witch hunt, this time in Guyenne and Bearn, by overturning the authority of the Parlement of Bordeaux and Bearn in the same manner.

== Legacy ==
The two interventions of Louis XIV against the witch hunts in Normandy and in Guyenne and Bearn in the 1670s has been taken as an example of how the witch hunt were stopped or limited in different parts in Europe by intervention of a central power against witch trials conducted by local authorities. Louis XIV's policy against witch trials by these two interventions were followed by the Edict of 1682. This Edict did not abolish witch trials, but it did restrict them by defining witchcraft as criminal superstition rather than real, and punishable only if combined with poisoning and blasphemy. After 1682, witchcraft persecutions in France were limited to small and rare cases, with the exception of the Trial of the Wizards of Lyon (1742–1745), and the last case took place in 1768.

== Sources ==
- Levack, Brian P. (2015). The Witch-Hunt in Early Modern Europe. Routledge. doi:10.4324/9781315685526. ISBN 978-1-315-68552-6.
- Gijswijt-Hofstra, Marijke; Levack, Brian P; Porter, Roy (1999). Witchcraft and magic in Europe. Athlone. ISBN 978-0-485-89005-1. OCLC 746854908.
- Fiske, John (1904). "Witchcraft in Salem Village". New France and New England. pp. 121–180.
