= Witchboard (2024 film) =

Film by Chuck Russell

- Theatrical release poster
- Directed by: Chuck Russell
- Screenplay by: Chuck Russell; Greg McKay
- Based on: Witchboard by Kevin Tenney
- Produced by: Chuck Russell; Kade Vu; Greg McKay; Bernie Gewissler
- Starring: Madison Iseman; Aaron Dominguez; Melanie Jarnson; Charlie Tahan; Antonia Desplat; Jamie Campbell Bower
- Cinematography: Yaron Levy
- Edited by: Alex Márquez; Joe Plenys; Émile Vallée
- Music by: Sam Ewing
- Production companies: A-Nation Media; Gala Film
- Distributed by: The Avenue; Atlas Distribution
- Release dates: July 26, 2024 (Fantasia); August 15, 2025 (United States)
- Running time: 112 minutes (Note: The cut of the film that premiered at the Fantasia International Film Festival ran 115 minutes in length. However, multiple sources note the theatrical release cut runs 112 minutes.)
- Countries: United States; Canada
- Languages: English; French
- Budget: $15 million
- Box office: $500,798

Witchboard is a 2024 supernatural horror film written and directed by Chuck Russell. A remake of the 1986 film, it stars Madison Iseman, Aaron Dominguez, Melanie Jarnson, Charlie Tahan, Antonia Desplat, and Jamie Campbell Bower. Its plot follows a young couple opening a restaurant in New Orleans who come in contact with a spirit board created in 17th-century France by a powerful witch who was ousted from her village in the Lorraine province.

Development of Witchboard began in 2017, when Russell became attached to the project as director and writer, adapting the screenplay from Kevin Tenney's original film. Russell co-wrote the screenplay with Greg McKay, and based its period elements on actual historical events that occurred during the witch trials in France. An independent co-production between the United States and Canada, Witchboard was shot on location in Montreal, Quebec and New Orleans, Louisiana in mid-2023.

Witchboard had its world premiere at the 28th Fantasia International Film Festival on July 26, 2024, and was released in the United States on August 15, 2025. It received mixed reviews from critics, with some favorably describing it as stylistically reminiscent of the horror films of the 1980s and 1990s. (Note: As noted in several critical reviews.) It ultimately grossed $500,798 at the box office.

== Plot ==
Emily, a recovering heroin addict, is helping to prepare for her fiancé Christian's opening of a restaurant in New Orleans's French Quarter in a renovated carriage house where they reside. While picking mushrooms in the forest, Emily comes across a historic spirit board which has recently been stolen from a local museum. At a dinner party, Emily shows the board to Christian's ex-girlfriend, Brooke, an academic and antiquities expert, who analyzes some of its symbols.

Emily discovers a pendulum made out of a human finger bone contained within the board's eye centerpiece. Believing that the board is allowing her to communicate with her own subconscious mind, Emily locates her lost engagement ring. Simultaneously, Christian's friend and employee, Richie, hand is dismembered by an electric meat slicer in a violent kitchen accident resulting in his death. Later, the board causes Emily's former drug dealer, Jessie, to fall from a rooftop to his death.

Emily awakens from a nightmare and consoled by Christian. Christian learns the board was stolen and that its thieves have since died, he suggests turning it into the authorities, but Emily refuses, fearing she may be suspected due to her criminal record of drug possession. Emily begins experiencing visions of the board's creator, Naga Soth, a witch who was persecuted in 1690s France, condemned, and outcast from her village in the Lorraine province by Bishop Grogan, a witchhunter who secretly wished to utilize her occult powers himself. After her banishment, the powerful Naga Soth cursed the village, causing them to turn against each other and eventually kill one another.

Worried about Emily's declining mental state, Christian seeks assistance from Alexander Babtiste, a New Age pagan and acquaintance of Brooke. Alexander visits the couple and, during a session with the board, places Emily in a trance during which her soul is transferred back in time to Naga Soth, who comes to possess Emily's body in the present day. As Emily faces execution for Naga Soth's crimes, Naga Soth poisons the guests at Christian's restaurant opening with mushrooms that cause them to hallucinate and kill one another, recreating her past vengeance. Alexander, who is present at the dinner, absconds while Brooke narrowly saves Christian, who is pursued by police.

Brooke brings Christian to Alexander's lavish ancestral estate. Brooke passes through the gate with Christian hiding in the trunk of the car. The trunk opens, revealing Brooke has decided to follow the practice of waca. It is revealed that Alexander is a descendant of Bishop Grogan and Emily a descendant of Naga Soth. Alexander seeks to be the master of Naga Soth, viewing it as a fulfillment of his ancestral lineage. Christian manages to kill several of the cultists and hurl the spirit board into a fireplace before being shot by Alexander. Meanwhile, Naga Soth, recalling Grogan's mistreatment of her, turns against Alexander. As the spirit board begins to burn, Naga Soth's soul is returned across time to her original body, only moments before her burning at the stake. Using her magic, Naga Soth keeps the fire at bay and taunts Grogan. Intent on carrying out the execution, Grogan attempts to decapitate Naga Soth, but she overpowers him and pulls him into the pyre, allowing them both to burn to death. Simultaneously, Alexander manages to save the board from the fireplace before Emily, her soul now restored to her physical body, shoots him to death. Emily consoles Christian as he dies of his wounds. After police descend on the scene, Alexander is placed in a body bag, only to open his eyes as the bag is zipped closed.

Some time later, Brooke visits the Vatican, where a Catholic priest offers her precious diamonds in exchange for the board. Before departing with Emily, the two hand over the bone pendulum. After they leave, the priest begins to communicate with the board before Naga Soth appears behind him.

== Cast ==
- Madison Iseman as Emily
- Aaron Dominguez as Christian
- Melanie Jarnson as Brooke
- Charlie Tahan as Richie
- Antonia Desplat as Naga Soth
- Jamie Campbell Bower as Alexander Babtiste
- David La Haye as Bishop Grogan

== Production ==
=== Development ===
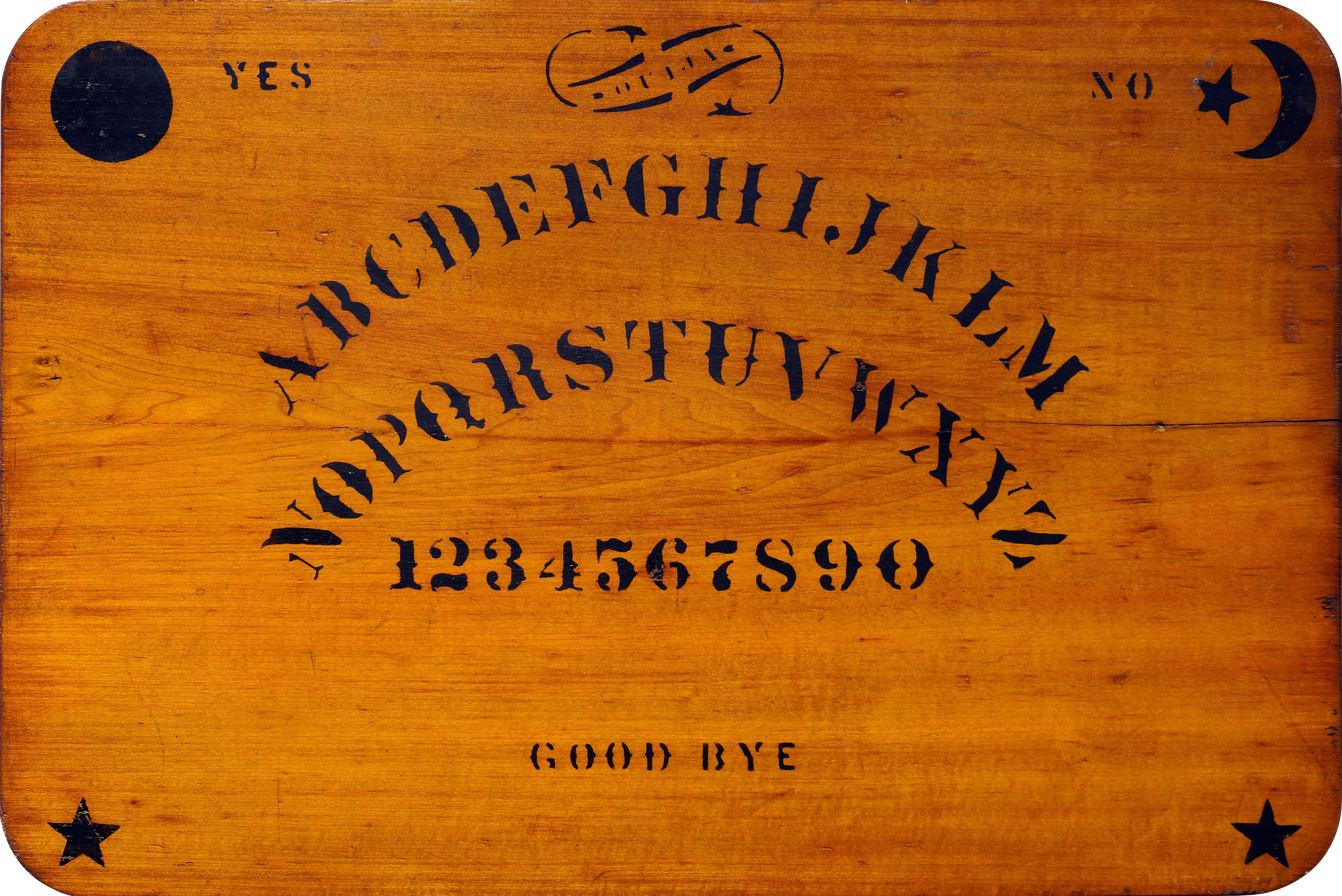
The pendulum board in the film differs from that featured in the 1986 original, which was more alike to a modern Ouija board (pictured)

In 2017, Chuck Russell became attached to write the script for a remake of the 1986 film Witchboard. It was reported in May 2019, that he would also direct the film and it would be produced by Grimmfest, in partnership with Minds Eye Entertainment, Falconer Pictures and M2 Media Post.

Unlike the original film, which is set entirely in modern-day California, the majority of Russell and Jim McKay's screenplay is set in New Orleans, with several period piece sequences set in 17th-century France. Commenting on his inspiration for the film and choice to set it in New Orleans, Russell said:

My impression of classic witchcraft and sorcery is associated with the mystique of New Orleans. There’s also literally a French connection in this story, as some of the most dramatic Witch Trials took place in France, and there is a connection with the French settling in New Orleans. I wanted to have a connection between this set of characters and the set of characters in the 1700s that created the Witchboard. Nothing could be more atmospheric and colorful than New Orleans.

The design of the spirit board also diverges from that in the original film, which features a more prototypical Ouija board, whereas the board featured in the 2024 film is loosely based on pendulum boards that date back to ancient Egypt and were progenitors to the modern Ouija board. According to Russell, the historic sequences in the film are based on documented witch trials in France, which included persecution for use of pendulum boards.

=== Casting ===
Jamie Campbell Bower was cast in the film as Alexander Babtiste in March 2023. Russell commented on his decision to cast Bower: "There is a tradition in cinema of great English actors that have the charisma we associate with stardom as well as the acting chops to truly be a chameleon, playing a variety of character types. Jamie Campbell Bower is that kind of actor and his time is now."

Madison Iseman's casting as the lead of Emily was announced in May 2023, along with that of Aaron Dominguez, Antonia Desplat, and Charlie Tahan. Iseman said she was drawn to the material as, "reading it from the perspective of an actor, there was a lot to jump into that made me excited, and a lot of elements that I haven't gotten to do yet in my career."

=== Filming ===
In March 2023, pre-production restarted with Russell's A-Nation Media and Gala Films replacing the previous production studios. The film was produced on a budget of approximately $15 million.

Principal photography took place in Montreal and New Orleans from April to June 2023. Some scenes were shot in Sainte-Anne-de-Bellevue at Morgan Arboretum in late May. The production was granted an interim agreement allowing the actors to continue working on the film during the 2023 SAG-AFTRA strike.

== Release ==
A teaser trailer for Witchboard debuted in August 2023 at San Diego Comic-Con, where Russell appeared as a panelist. The film. had its world premiere the following year at the 28th Fantasia International Film Festival on July 26, 2024. In October 2024, Highland Film Group acquired international sales rights to the film.

Witchboard was given a limited theatrical release in the United States by The Avenue and Atlas Distribution on August 15, 2025 in 580 theaters.

The film was released via digital streaming through Paramount Home Entertainment on September 16, 2025.

== Reception ==
=== Box office ===
On its opening night in the United States, the film earned $74,000, averaging $128 per screen. It concluded its opening weekend with $197,000 in ticket sales, averaging $339 per screen.

As of October 23, 2025, the film has earned $269,300 domestically and $231,498 in international territories, making for a worldwide box office gross of $500,798.

=== Critical response ===
On the review aggregator website Rotten Tomatoes, 61% of 44 critics' reviews are positive, with an average rating of 5.4/10. The website's consensus reads: "A re-imagining that's as frantic as it is uneven, Witchboard conjures up an old-school horror romp with gonzo special effects, campy performances, and witchy atmosphere." Metacritic, which uses a weighted average, assigned the film a score of 50 out of 100, based on 6 critics, indicating "mixed or average" reviews.

Josh Korngut, writing for Dread Central, gave the film a four out of five rating, writing that "although its plot unravels a smidge in the final act, and its runtime is about 20 minutes longer than I would've recommended, these few blemishes somehow only add to the film's overall charm and commitment to the bit." Joe Lipsett of Bloody Disgusting gave the film a two and a half out of five rating, summarizing that "it's messy and uneven, scattered in both narrative and performance, but fun enough to lightly recommend." Writing for Rue Morgue, Deirdre Crimmins noted: "It is not a perfect film. Its characters and plot are thin, and at times it is unclear if we are supposed to root for or against the board and the witches. But it also feels like a throwback to the sort of mid-budget horror films made in the ’80s and ’90s that have all but disappeared from the slate of film releases in this century. It prioritizes madness and commotion over artistry or coherence, and comes away successful in that quest. It is hard to ding a film that refuses to take itself too seriously when it does just that."

J. Hurtado, writing for ScreenAnarchy, noted: "Though it doesn’t reinvent the wheel, Russell’s Witchboard is a perfectly decent—if a little long—stab at the haunted item subgenre that should satisfy fans of the earlier franchise." Rob Hunter of Film School Rejects described the film at its premiere at the Fantasia International Film Festival as "an okay romp, a slightly better one if Russell makes some judicious cuts before its eventual release, but it can’t touch the original or even come close to the highs of his own 80s classics." RogerEbert.com's Clint Worthington noted of the performances that "Iseman makes for a capable lead, but she’s surrounded by a devil’s row of mismatched and miscalibrated supporting players," and described the film as a throwback to the horror films of the 1980s and 1990s, awarding it two and a half out of four stars. Terry Sherwood of Film Threat likened the film's period sequences to the film Witchfinder General (1968) and described it as "ambitious and fun at times, an overcooked horror revival with a blending addiction allegory, foodie satire, and supernatural spectacle."

Writing for Paste, critic Jim Vorel gave the film a favorable assessment, describing it as "relentlessly entertaining, nasty in its misanthropic delight in messing with its characters, stylishly put together, and unexpectedly sexy to boot. Deeply silly but more narratively ambitious than one would likely expect, it’s bursting (honestly overstuffed) with ideas and cinematic verve, taking advantage of a slightly longer runtime to really venture into increasingly bonkers metaphysical territory as it draws on and creates new cinematic tropes for movies about witches." The Mercury News's Randy Myers felt the film was an improvement upon the original, adding that it "gives diehard fans a gory, well-acted throwback that faithfully adheres to the genre playbook. Although it runs on for far too long (nearly 2 hours!), Russell executes the bloodshed and witchery in Gothic style."

In a mixed review, Mark Hanson of Slant Magazine awarded the film a two out of four star-rating, describing its supernatural elements as "run-of-the-mill," but conceded: "Some of the period action set pieces are spirited in their staging, while the film doesn’t lack for gruesome and elaborate kill sequences, which is almost enough to distract from the screenplay’s patchiness and insipid characterizations." Starburst's Martin Unsworth awarded the film three out of five stars, summarizing: "Radically different to the original movie, Russell’s version is a stylish if slightly overlong mixture of character drama and mystical horror... It’s doubtful Russell’s Witchboard will gain the cult following the original has, but even with some flaws, it’s an entertaining picture." Tyler Nichols of JoBlo.com also gave the film a mixed review, rating it 5 stars out of 10 and calling it "very silly and clearly meant to be seen with a crowd. It’s more formulaic than I was expecting, but Russell delivers some great Final Destination-y kills. There aren’t any characters to attach to as they’re busy making bad decisions but the villain is eclectic and fun. I’m sure with another viewing, and rooting against these kids, could have a better return on time investment."

Kevin Tenney, the writer and director of the original film, commented favorably on its "strong cast, masterful direction, and gorgeous cinematography. Although it’s an entirely different story with different characters, it does manage to pay homage to three or four sequences from my original film."
