= Cedric Smith (actor) =

British-Canadian actor

- Born: Bournemouth, Dorset, England
- Occupations: Actor, musician
- Years active: 1975–present
- Spouse: Catherine Disher (divorced)
- Children: 1

Cedric Smith is an English Canadian actor and musician. He portrayed Alec King in the CBC television series Road to Avonlea, and was the voice of Charles Xavier / Professor X in the X-Men: The Animated Series.

== Music ==
Born in Bournemouth, Hampshire (now Dorset), England, Smith moved to Canada when he was about 10 years old. In 1961, he dropped out of high school to become a full-time folk singer. He was a member of the folk group Perth County Conspiracy, and wrote several songs that were performed and recorded by the band. Circa 1963, he performed at the "Lemon Tree" coffee house in Dayton, Ohio, for an extended time. Between sets he would read from a giant volume of Shakespeare. As a folk singer, he sang at the "Ebony Knight" coffee house on Main Street in Hamilton in the mid 1960s; he also had performances at the "Black Swan" coffee house in Stratford, Ontario, in 1967 and 1968.

He sang on Loreena McKennitt's album Elemental in 1985.

== Acting ==
Smith won a Gemini Award for Best Performance by an Actor in a Continuing Leading Dramatic Role in 1993 for his part in Road to Avonlea. He appeared on the syndicated program Mutant X in its first season, as well as on the cult hit Forever Knight alongside his then-wife Catherine Disher.

He also provided the voice of Mentor on the short-lived Silver Surfer animated series, also on the Fox network. Smith also provides narration for Canada's History Television's series Turning Points in History.

Smith played the role of Professor Marvel / The Wizard of Oz in the 2012 to 2014 Toronto and North American tour productions of Andrew Lloyd Webber’s The Wizard of Oz.

== Personal life ==
Smith is the ex-husband of Catherine Disher; the two worked on Forever Knight and X-Men: The Animated Series. They have a son, Darcy Montgomery Smith, born in 1993.

== Filmography ==
=== Film ===
Year	Title	Role	Notes
1977	Who Has Seen the Wind	Dr. Svarich	
1979	Fast Company	Gary 'The Blacksmith' Black	
1981	Heavy Metal	Bartender (voice)	Segment: "Taarna"
1985	Bayo	Squid Hayman	
1985	Samuel Lount	William Lyon Mackenzie	
1988	The Suicide Club	Paul Stevens on TV	
1989	Millennium	Eli Seibel	
1993	Letter from Francis	Father Tremblay	Short film
1995	Butterbox Babies	Frank Davis	
1995	Titanica	(Narration)	IMAX documentary; shorter version of '92 release
1995	Witchboard III: The Possession	Francis	
1998	Sleeping Dogs Lie	J.J. Gallagher	
2003	The Visual Bible: The Gospel of John	Caiaphas	
2004	Raymond Radcliffe	Frederick Radcliffe	Short film
2005	Anne: Journey to Green Gables	Tupper (voice)	Video
2010	Verona	Dean August	Short film
2014	The Dependables	Paul Stansy	A.k.a: Pride of Lions
2014	The Christmas Switch	Sam Wells	
2015	Life on Juniper	Barry	Short film

=== Television ===
Year	Title	Role	Notes
1976	Teleplay	Luke	Episode: "The Italian Machine"
1980	The Great Detective	Paquette	Episode: "The Man Who Died Twice"
1981	Titans	Billy Bishop	Episode: "Billy Bishop"
1982	The Littlest Hobo	Terry	Episode: "Rabies"
1985	Anne of Green Gables	Rev. Allan	TV miniseries
1985	Night Heat	John Deacon	Episode: "The Fifth Man"
1986	Hot Shots	Remy	Episode: "Tails You Lose"
1986	In This Corner	Michael Wellborne / Vincent McCarthy	Television film
1986–1990	The Campbells	Thomas Sims	Main role
1987	Heaven on Earth	Mr. Macdonald	Television film
1987	Street Legal	Max	Episode: "A Matter of Honour"
1988	Adderly	Tukanin	Episode: "Point of No Return"
1988	Night Heat	Demarcus	Episode: "The Privilege of Freedom"
1988	Friday the 13th: The Series	Joe Fenton	Episode: "The Pirate's Promise"
1988	The Twilight Zone	Dr. Jeremy Sinclair	Episode: "The Curious Case of Edgar Witherspoon"
1988–89	Alfred Hitchcock Presents	Paul Stevens / Van Dorn	2 episodes
1989	War of the Worlds	Adrian Bouchard	Episode: "Among the Philistines"
1989	The Penthouse	Commissioner Warner	Television film
1989	Love and Hate: The Story of Colin and JoAnn Thatcher	Tony Wilson	Television film
1989	Dick Francis: In the Frame	Inspector Frost	Television film
1990	Bordertown	Commissioner Geoffrey Osborne	Episode: "Two Moons"
1990	The Ray Bradbury Theater	Dr. Arnold Fellows	Episode: "The Murderer"
1990	Counterstrike	Cantrell	Episode: "Dealbreaker"
1990	Counterstrike	Marlowe	Episode: "Cinema Verite"
1990–1996	Road to Avonlea	Alec King	Main role
1991	Beyond Reality	Bill Bowen	Episode: "Miracle Worker"
1991	Le peloton d'exécution	Lt. Col. Harfield	Television film
1992	E.N.G.	Dr. Dawson	Episode: "Heart of the Matter"
1992	Lost in the Barrens II: The Curse of the Viking Grave	Connoly	Television film
1992	Street Legal	Bruce Parkhill	Episode: "Children's Hour"
1992–1997	X-Men: The Animated Series	Professor Charles Xavier, Cerebro, Red Skull, Dr. James Xavier (voice)	TV series
1993	Street Legal	Henry Sutton	2 episodes
1993	Kung Fu: The Legend Continues	Dr. Mims	Episode: "Straitjacket"
1993	JFK: Reckless Youth	Prof. Bruce Hopper	Television film
1993–1994	Tales from the Cryptkeeper	Boswick, Onnaya (voice)	2 episodes
1994	Forever Knight	Liam O'Neal	Episode: "Bad Blood"
1994	Million Dollar Babies	Lowell Thomas	TV miniseries
1994–1996	Highlander: The Animated Series	Scott (voice)	TV series
1995	Hiroshima	Curtis LeMay	Television film
1995	Spider-Man: The Animated Series	Professor Charles Xavier (voice)	2 episodes
1996	Blazing Dragons	Count Geoffrey (voice)	Episode: "2.1"
1996	Golden Will: The Silken Laumann Story	Mike Spracklen	Television film
1996	Everything to Gain	Edward Jordan	Television film
1997	F/X: The Series	Mickey O'Brien	Episode: "Shooting Mickey"
1998	Turning Points of History	Narrator (voice)	Episode: "A Very Russian Coup"
1998	Silver Surfer	Mentor (voice)	Episode: "Learning Curve"
1998	The Long Island Incident	Tim Bobek	Television film
1998	Thunder Point	Henry Baker	Television film
1998	Highlander: The Raven	Morgan Kenworth	Episode: "Bloodlines"
1998	Mythic Warriors	King Polydectes (voice)	Episode: "Perseus: The Search for Medusa"
1998	Happy Christmas, Miss King	Alec King	Television film
1998	Leonardo: A Dream of Flight	Il Moro	Television film
1999	Sea People	Samuel 'Sam' Casey	Television film
1999	Twice in a Lifetime	Dr. Eldridge Hawke	Episode: "School's Out"
1999	Goya: Awakened in a Dream	Francisco Goya	Television film
1999	Rescue Heroes	Seymour Wilde (voice)	TV series
2001	Blue Murder	Michael Hamori	Episode: "Dr. Tara"
2001	Mutant X	Dr. Paul Breedlove	Episode: "The Shock of the New"
2001	Jenifer	Dr. Richards	Television film
2002	Keep the Faith, Baby	Harry S. Truman	Television film
2002	Earth: Final Conflict	Prof. Hightower	Episode: "Grave Danger"
2002	Relic Hunter	Lawyer	Episode: "Pandora's Box"
2002	Soul Food	Alderman Glickman	Episode: "Out with the Old..."
2002	Power and Beauty	Thompson	Television film
2003	Veritas: The Quest	Willie Anderson	Episode: "Ssangraal"
2003	Doc	Martin Wainwright	Episode: "Smoke Gets in Your Eyes"
2003	Street Time	Elliot Winthrop	Episode: "Follow the Money"
2003	More Than Meets the Eye: The John Brock Story	Bob	Television film
2005	Totally Spies!	Prof. Link (voice)	Episode: "Head Shrinker Much?"
2006	This Is Wonderland	Kenneth Pederson	Episode: "3.5"
2006	Shades of Black: The Conrad Black Story	George	Television film
2007	The Company	Allen Dulles	TV miniseries
2007–2009	Friends and Heroes	Tiberius (voice)	Main role
2008	XIII: The Conspiracy	Abe Miller	TV miniseries
2010	Turn the Beat Around	Gino	Television film
2010	Living in Your Car	Paul	3 episodes
2010	The Last Christmas	Grandpa	Television film
2011	The Kennedys	Sen. Eastland	Episode: "Life Sentences"
2011	John A.: Birth of a Country	Edmund Head	Television film
2012	Whiskey Business	Jack	Television film
2012	Murdoch Mysteries	Langston Wallace	Episode: "Murdoch Night in Canada"
2012	Baby's First Christmas	Henry Kotter	Television film
2012–13	Copper	Father Liam Burke	Recurring role
2015	The Music in Me	Henry	Television film
2018	Mysticons	The Panhandler / The Dragon King (voice)	2 episodes
