= Peronne Goguillon =

French alleged witch

Peronne Goguillon (died 29 May 1679) was an alleged French witch. She and the other women who were accused with her are regarded the last women to have been burned at the stake for witchcraft in France.

== Life ==
On 8 May 1679, four soldiers from the garrison at Marchiennes, near Douai, behaved violently in a village in Bouvignies. They demanded money from the villagers, and took one of them, Peronne Goguillon, with them and accused her of being a witch. On 10 May, her husband Andrieu Dufosset complained about this, but the next day, Michel Fontenier, the landlord of one of the soldiers, confirmed that she was a witch, possibly in fear of the soldiers.

Twenty witnesses were called to the trial. Peronne was accused of having violated the holy sacrament, visited the witch's sabbath, having met the devil in shape of a black dog called Fréquette, cast spells on children, women and cattle, performed an abortion, and killed children. Three marks were found upon her body. She was eventually made to confess that they were given her by the devil. She pointed out her cousin Jeanne Goguillon, Jeanne Bachy, Jean Bachy, Pierre Hornet and her daughter Marie-Anne Dufosset (age 18) as witches on 24 May. Two days later, she also identified Marie-Anne Ducrocquet, Andrieu Fischel, Philippote Fischel, and Madeleine Truan. On 28 May, Peronne was judged guilty of witchcraft and sentenced to death by burning. The sentence was carried out 29 May 1679.

Jeanne Goguillon was burned 3 July 1679 after a mark was found on her body. Marie-Anne Dufosset was judged guilty on the same charges as her mother and burned. These are regarded as the last women to be executed for witchcraft in France; the last women were put on trial in 1748 and 1768, but sentenced to fines; however, the last person to be executed for sorcery in France was male, Louis Debaraz, who was executed in 1745.
