= If Not for You (TV series) =

- Genre: Sitcom
- Created by: Larry Levin
- Composer: Mark Mothersbaugh
- Country of origin: United States
- Original language: English
- No. of seasons: 1
- No. of episodes: 7 (3 unaired)

Production
- Camera setup: Multi-camera
- Running time: 30 minutes
- Production companies: Rock Island Productions; Touchstone Television

Original release
- Network: CBS
- Release: September 18 – October 9, 1995

If Not For You is an American sitcom television series created by Larry Levin, that aired on CBS from September 18 until October 9, 1995.

== Premise ==
Craig and Jessie fall in love with each other. Their only problem is that they are already involved with other people.

== Cast ==
- Elizabeth McGovern as Jessie Kent
- Hank Azaria as Craig Schaeffer
- Debra Jo Rupp as Eileen
- Jim Turner as Cal
- Reno Wilson as Bobby
- Peter Krause as Elliot
- Jane Sibbett as Melanie

== Episodes ==
No.	Title	Directed by	Written by	Original release date
1	"Detour Ahead"	Barnet Kellman	Larry Levin	September 18, 1995
Craig and Jessie meet at a restaurant and discover that they work at the same recording studio.
2	"Taking a Shower with My Two True Loves"	Robert Berlinger	Dennis Klein	September 25, 1995
Craig gives Jessie an expensive gift and crashes her engagement party.
3	"The Kiss"	John Rich	Leslie Caveny	October 2, 1995
Jessie's fiancée invites Craig out for lunch.
4	"Snap!"	John Rich and Dennis Erdman	Leslie Caveny	October 9, 1995
Jessie and Craig tries to end their engagements. Bobby gets help from a motivational expert.
5	"The Day the Halo Came Off"	John Rich	Dan Castellaneta	UNAIRED
Craig tries to end his relationship with Melanie, while Elliot tries to win Jessie back.
6	"Who Are You?"	Chris Parnell	John Rich	UNAIRED
Jessie and Craig go out on their first date. Cal tries to date women who are either married or engaged.
7	"Rise and Shine"	James Widdoes	John Rich	UNAIRED
