= Burke Byrnes =

American actor (born 1937)

- Born: December 9, 1937 (age 88); Oceanside, New York, U.S.
- Occupation: Actor
- Years active: 1969–1994

Burke Byrnes (born December 9, 1937) is an American former actor, best known as the voice for Daddy Topps in The Land Before Time. He appeared in more than seventy films from 1969 to 1994.

== Filmography ==
Film
| Year | Title | Role | Notes |
|---|---|---|---|
| 1972 | Gidget Gets Married | Phillips | |
| 1972 | The New Centurions | Jack | |
| 1973 | Scorpio | Morrison | |
| 1974 | The Terminal Man | Benson's Guard #2 | |
| 1976 | Bound for Glory | Mr. Graham - Conducting Cocoanut Grove Auditions | |
| 1977 | Fun with Dick and Jane | Roger | |
| 1978 | A Different Story | Richard II | |
| 1979 | Prophecy | Travis Nelson | |
| 1979 | The Onion Field | CHP Officer Odom | |
| 1979 | 10 | | |
| 1979 | Meteor | Coast Guard Officer | |
| 1982 | Airplane II: The Sequel | Businessman #3 | |
| 1983 | Private School | Mr. Ramsay | |
| 1985 | The Falcon and the Snowman | U.S. Customs Official | |
| 1986 | Legal Eagles | Second Cop | |
| 1986 | Witchboard | Lt. Dewhurst | |
| 1988 | The Land Before Time | Daddy Topps (Cera's Father) | Voice |
| 1990 | The Last of the Finest | Commander Orsni | |
| 1990 | Catchfire | Fed #1 | |
| 1990 | Air America | Recruiter | |
| 1990 | Taking Care of Business | Prison Guard #1 | |
| 1990 | After Dark, My Sweet | Cop | |
| 1991 | Child's Play 3 | Sgt. Clark | |
| 1991 | Curly Sue | Dr. Maxwell | |
| 1993 | Robot Wars | Technician | |
| 1994 | Moment of Truth: Cradle of Conspiracy | Det. Otis | TV movie |

Television
| Year | Title | Role | Notes |
|---|---|---|---|
| 1975 | Hustling | Bus Driver | TV movie |
| 1977 | The Trial of Lee Harvey Oswald | TV movie | |
| 1977 | The Night They Took Miss Beautiful | Barney Jessup | TV movie |
| 1984 | The A-Team | Federal Marshal | 1 episode |
| 1984–1985 | Dallas | Pete Adams | 9 episodes |
| 1985 | Love on the Run | Melvin Small | TV movie |
| 1986 | Capitol | Dr. Franklin | 1 episode |
| 1987 | Highway To Heaven | Malcolm Sheesley | 1 episode |
