= Witchtrap =

- VHS cover
- Directed by: Kevin S. Tenney
- Written by: Kevin S. Tenney
- Starring: James W. Quinn; Kathleen Bailey; Linnea Quigley
- Cinematography: Thomas Jewett
- Edited by: William O. Sullivan
- Music by: Dennis Michael Tenney
- Production company: Cinema Plus
- Distributed by: Cinema Plus
- Release date: September 7, 1989
- Running time: 91 minutes
- Country: United States
- Language: English

Witchtrap (also known as The Presence) is a 1989 American supernatural horror film written and directed by Kevin S. Tenney and starring James W. Quinn, Kathleen Bailey, and Linnea Quigley. The film follows a team of parapsychologists who attempt to exorcise a haunted inn with the help of a device designed to lure in and trap evil spirits. The central villain is a male witch, also known as a warlock. Witchtrap was released direct to video.

== Plot ==
Whitney O'Shay is a clairvoyant who is reluctant to embrace her psychic proclivities. She is pursued by Agnes and Felix Goldberg, two fellow paranormal investigators who encourage her to utilize her gifts. Whitney is convinced by the Goldbergs to assist in the investigation of a gothic Victorian home in Solano County, California, alleged to be haunted by the spirit of its original owner, Avery Lauter, a famed illusionist, warlock, and suspected serial killer. Also joining the crew are video technician Ginger Kowowski, and skeptical operatives Murphy, Levi Jackson and Tony Vicente. Devon Lauter, Avery's nephew, has made an effort to reopen the home as an inn catering to paranormal tourists, but has halted the plan after Azimov, a magician enlisted to spend the night in the house, died under mysterious circumstances.

After an ill attempt at a séance, Whitney is overcome by visions of Avery, and Ginger is subsequently impaled to death by Avery's spirit in the shower. The group find Ginger's corpse, and believe the groundskeeper, Elwin, murdered her. When Levi attempts to leave to notify authorities, Avery's spirit takes control of Levi's car, running him over. Avery proceeds to kill Murphy while Agnes and Felix quarrel over Agnes's ruthless attempt at pursuing their investigation. Meanwhile, Elwin attacks Tony in the basement of the house, but flees.

Agnes and Felix calm Whitney, who again bore psychic witness to Avery's murders. Tony remains skeptical of the Goldbergs' claims that the events are supernatural in origin. At nightfall, Elwin returns and fires his gun at the gasoline tank of the group's van, exploding it, before shooting Felix in the leg. Whitney becomes convinced that Avery is attempting to complete a ritual in the home that will garner him immortality. Agnes claims that finding Avery's heart, which is hidden somewhere in the home, can stop the ritual from moving forward.

When Felix becomes possessed by Avery, Agnes confronts him with her belief that his heart is located behind a stone wall in the basement, which has been emblazoned with a pentagram. After the heart is located in a locked box behind the wall, Avery takes control of Whitney, intermittently possessing her, and kills Felix before hurling a hatchet into Agnes's head, killing her too. Tony manages to thwart Avery's efforts to kill him and Whitney by using an electromagnetic device that captures Avery's energy field, though Whitney warns Tony that the device is not strong enough to contain him.

Whitney and Tony rush to the home's attic, where Avery's makeshift Satanic altar is held. Meanwhile, the device, left in the basement, is burned as Avery's spirit escapes it, bursting through the floor and attacking Whitney. A possessed Whitney proceeds to consume Avery's cremated remains from an urn, allowing Avery to return fully manifested. Boasting of his immortality, Avery is shot by Tony, but the bullets prove ineffective, until he begins shooting at the box containing Avery's heart. Tony hurls the box from the attic window, causing Avery's spirit to burst into flames. Avery's flesh melts away, revealing the living Whitney beneath. At dawn, Whitney and Tony depart the house in Levi's car.

Some time later, Tony resumes his security job, haunted by his memories of Avery, and relentlessly hounded by civilians seeking help with paranormal activity.

== Cast ==
- James W. Quinn as Tony Vincente
- Kathleen Bailey as Whitney O'Shay
- Judy Tatum as Agnes Goldberg
- Rob Zapple as Felix Goldberg
- Jack W. Thompson as Murphy
- Clyde Talley II as Levi Jackson
- Hal Havins as Elwin
- Linnea Quigley as Ginger Kowalski
- Kevin S. Tenney as Devon Lauder
- J. P. Luebsen as Avery Lauter
- Richard Fraga as "Amazing" Azimov
- Lynn McRee as Q.T. Secretary

== Release ==
=== Critical response ===
A contemporary review in Variety criticized the film's ending as "cryptic", and noted that the "makeup effects by Judy Yonemoto are okay". In his book Creature Features: The Science Fiction, Fantasy, and Horror Movie Guide, John Stanley wrote that "due to flat, nonatmospheric lighting, mediocre actresses and inadequate effects, Witchtrap limps along without much conviction." Brian Orndorf of Blu-ray.com called the film "an engaging feature" that "builds to a satisfying grand finale, only making a few missteps in tone and technical achievements", though he noted that "the screenplay's interest in spiritual debates is perhaps better left to a more sophisticated picture".

=== Home media ===
Witchtrap was released direct-to-video by Magnum Home Entertainment on September 7, 1989.

In March 2017, the film was restored in 2K and released on DVD and Blu-ray by Vinegar Syndrome.
