= Arrival II =

1998 American science fiction film

- DVD cover
- Directed by: Kevin S. Tenney
- Written by: Mark David Perry
- Produced by: Claudio Castravelli
- Starring: Patrick Muldoon; Michael Sarrazin; Jane Sibbett; Catherine Blythe; Michael Scherer; Larry Day
- Cinematography: Bruno Philip
- Edited by: Heidi Haines
- Music by: Ned Bouhalassa
- Production companies: Rootbeer Films; Taurus 7 Film Corporation
- Distributed by: Artisan Entertainment
- Release date: November 6, 1998 (US)
- Running time: 101 minutes
- Country: Canada
- Language: English
- Budget: $6 million

Arrival II, alternatively titled The Second Arrival, is a 1998 American science fiction direct-to-video film directed by Kevin S. Tenney. The film is a sequel to the 1996 film The Arrival. It was written by Mark David Perry and based on characters created by David Twohy. The film stars Patrick Muldoon, Michael Sarrazin, Jane Sibbett, Catherine Blythe, Michael Scherer, and Larry Day.

== Plot ==
Two years after the first film, Zane Zaminsky is found dead in a remote Inuit community. It is reported that he died of a heart attack. His broadcast to the world about the aliens is widely believed to have been a UFO hoax due to his dismissal from NASA (this despite Earth continuing to have record temperatures). As his death is announced on TV, five people receive envelopes with details of an alien invasion: three scientists, Zane's half-brother Jack Addison (a computer expert whom he has not seen in seven years), and a reporter named Bridget Riordan. They receive papers talking of global warming and of aliens terraforming Earth into a planet that is hot, like their own dying world.

The group gets together in a large freezer (as the aliens can't stand cold) to see what Zane has left them. They find some alien artifacts in an envelope left to the group. One of the five, Trevor Anguilar, suffers from the cold and is revealed as an alien. He sets off a metal sphere (a "black hole bomb" or BHB as it rises into the air, revolves then sucks everything in a large area into it, causing it to vanish permanently). The alien and one of the men, Tom Billings, are sucked into the BHB's area of influence as well as the contents of the room but Addison, Riordan, and Zarcoff manage to escape.

Zarcoff in his hotel room is killed by an alien metal spider machine which injects him, making it look like his death was from a heart attack. Addison goes back to his room to find a BHB has cleared them of everything. Sandra Wolfe, a girl he picked up and slept with last night turns out to be an alien. She and another alien, Wotan, inject Addison and he later wakes up to find himself being "taken for a ride".

Addison rolls out of the car and despite terrible disorientation manages to elude them and team up with Riordan again. The aliens have set the FBI on the two as well as cancelling their credit cards and emptying Addison's bank account of $15,000. The pair have only one artifact left and that produces a perfect 3D hologram when a laser beam is shone through it. They use it to find out that an atomic power plant due to be opened near where they are in Quebec is in the hands of the aliens. They soon find out that it will go critical and will spread deadly radiation over many hundreds of miles (the aliens are immune to radiation).

Addison and Riordan attempt to show the hologram at a climate seminar, and Addison's boss, Burke, agrees to help them. Before they can activate the device, they are caught by Dave Cyrus, another of Addison's co-workers who has sold them out to the FBI. Burke kills Cyrus and frames Addison for it, revealing himself to be an alien, as well. Barely escaping, Addison and Riordan break into a university and use an industrial laser to properly activate the artifact.

Addison uses his computer skills to walk around and interact with an alien ship in space and to program a giant BHB deep below the power plant to go off in one hour. The aliens arrive and both are captured from the hologram. In the atomic power station, their time seems to be up until the giant BHB goes off in the alien area below it and starts ripping apart and swallowing the atomic power station. Wotan and Wolfe are dragged through the gaping hole in the floor. Nearly dragged into its sphere of influence himself, Addison uses a small BHB to stop the giant one long enough for him and Riordan to escape. They just make it as all that is left of the power station is a huge hole in the ground. Burke also survives, but injured, his alien features partly visible. He warns Addison that the aliens haven't been stopped, just delayed.

Some time later, Riordan's book Alien Agenda (which details their recent adventures as well as the alien's plans for the world) is still top of The New York Times best seller lists after 2 months. The world still seems to consider it all fiction. The film ends with the married couple driving to Alaska and it is just beginning to snow as they cross the border, which suits them fine.

== Cast ==
- Patrick Muldoon as Jack Addison, the half-brother of Zane Zaminsky, who picks up his brother's crusade after he is killed
- Michael Sarrazin as Professor Nelson Zarcoff, an associate of Jack and Zane's
- Jane Sibbett as Bridget Riordan, an ambitious reporter working for a newspaper company
- Catherine Blythe as Sandra Wolfe, a woman whom Jack has a one night stand with
- Michael Scherer as Wotan, an agent hired by Burke to track down anyone who has uncovered the invading extraterrestrials' plans
- Larry Day as Burke
- Steve Adams as Dave Cyrus
- Emidio Michetti as Trevor Anguilar
- Stéphane Blanchette as Tom Billings
- David Nerman as Newspaper Editor

== See also ==
- List of films featuring extraterrestrials
