= Going to Kansas City =

- Film poster
- Directed by: Pekka Mandart
- Screenplay by: Morrie Ruvinsky
- Story by: Tony MacNabb; Pekka Mandart
- Produced by: Robin Spry; Paul E. Painter; Alicia Wille; Lise Abastado; Pamela Mandart
- Starring: Mikko Nousiainen; Melissa Galianos; Michael Ironside; Susan Almgren
- Cinematography: Pini Hellstedt
- Edited by: David R. McLeod
- Music by: Marty Simon
- Production companies: Mandart Entertainment; Telescene Film Group
- Distributed by: Buena Vista International (Finland)
- Release dates: February 1998 (Los Angeles Filmmarket); July 31, 1998 (Finland)
- Running time: 98 minutes
- Countries: Finland; Canada
- Language: English
- Budget: 17 million mk

Going to Kansas City is a 1998 drama film directed by Pekka Mandart. The film is about a male exchange student from Finland, who falls in love with an American girl, whose father does not accept the relationship. Shot in Canada, the film is a Canadian-Finnish co-production and is set in the rural town of Canaan that is located 120 miles west of Kansas City.

== Cast ==
- Mikko Nousiainen as Mikko Vihavainen
- Melissa Galianos as Carly Malone
- Michael Ironside as Deputy Sheriff Mike Malone
- Susan Almgren as Bonnie Bruckner
- Daniel Pilon as Jack Bruckner
- Kris Holden-Ried as Charlie Bruckner
- Mark Camacho as Billy Ossining
- Karine Dion as Karen Olson
- Shawn Potter as Tink Kolchek
- Adam MacDonald as Floyd Weaver

== Production ==
The director Pekka Mandart adapted the idea of the story from a magazine article about a love story between a Finnish exchange student and an American girl.

Out of a total budget of 17 million Finnish markka (mk), 11 million mk came from the Canadian production company Telescene. The Finnish Film Foundation granted a three-million mk production support for Going to Kansas City. The total amount of production costs were 14,278,968 mk.

== Reception ==
Going to Kansas City had a total of 42,524 admissions in Finnish theatres.

The film was a nominee for the Best Music at the 1999 Jussi Awards and the National Council for Cinema of Finland awarded it a 100,000 mk Quality support for film productions.
