= Endangered Species (2003 film) =

Endangered Species.
- Directed by: Kevin S. Tenney
- Written by: Kevin S. Tenney
- Starring: Eric Roberts; Arnold Vosloo; John Rhys-Davies
- Release date: 2003
- Running time: 94 minutes
- Country: United States

Endangered Species (also released as Earth Alien) is a 2003 American science fiction horror film written and directed by Kevin S. Tenney. It follows a cop, Mike "Sully" Sullivan (Eric Roberts) trying to find out who is behind a series of killings at the local gyms, eventually realising that the killer is actually an indestructible alien, who has come to make clothes out of human beings. Along the way, he teams up with Warden (Arnold Vosloo), also an alien who has come to earth to protect humanity. The supporting cast includes John Rhys-Davies.

== Plot ==
The film opens with another gym killing, yet another in a killing spree by an unknown person, who only attacks local spas and gyms. Among those investigating is Mike "Sully" Sullivan, Wyznowski and Yamata at the crime scene, Sully spots a mysterious man leaving, and does not believe him to be one of the police force. They find that there was one sole survivor, a young woman who hid in her locker, and is currently at the hospital, under heavy medication. While visiting her, Sully recognizes the same man from early, who actually questioned the young woman, as she believed him to be a cop. Sully and Wyznowski give chase, with Sulley eventually managing to take down the man with his own taser.

At the station, he still refuses to talk, but Sully still believes him to be the killer. Unable to hold him, another attack takes place against a strip club, leaving many dead. While the police give chase, Sully sneaks into the man's apartment, discovering many alien gadgets. He finds many unseen corners when putting on a pair of glasses, but when he leaves, he ends up in the same car as the man, who is trying to take down the hunter. However, his truck is invisible, and Sully and Warden put on their glasses to spot him. Warden tries to take out his tires, and they both end up crashing. Sully shoots the hunter, but to no avail. Warden stops the hunter, but hesitates to kill him, allowing him to escape. Warden reveals he is the same species and was unable to bring himself to kill him. However, an explosion severed the hunter's arm, which Sully takes for analysis while warden flees the scene.

Sully has also picked up some of the hunter's weapons, which he also turns over. while Yamata is analyzing the arm, it attacks him, trying to choke him. The hunter then enters behind him, strangling him to death before re-attaching his arm. Meanwhile, Sully and Wyznowski learn that the guns bullets are capable of chasing people down like a heat seeking missile. Wyznowski is cynical and fires the gun, killing himself. Meanwhile, the hunter goes on a killing spree in the police station, taking each of guns along the way. Warden appears and manages to save Sully, while the hunter takes his bazooka and leaves.

That night, Sully finds Warden near a warehouse, but Warden reveals he had a trap set, until Sully came and ruined it. They argue about species, and Warden reveals that his kind killed the dinosaurs and made their skins into jackets, thus leaving their kind extinct. The hunter appears and attacks, causing the two to take shelter within the warehouse. Warden then sets the "auto destruct" on his spaceship in the warehouse. Warden tries to stop the hunter again, like he did earlier, but the hunter shoots him. Sully is then forced to play a deadly game of cat and mouse with the hunter, who captures him and prepares to kill him with a knife. Sully, however, manages to trick him into stabbing a fuse box, electrocuting and killing him. Sulley rushes back to Warden's side as he dies. The "auto destruct" begins its final countdown, with Sully running out of the warehouse as it blows up.

The film ends with Sully buying a puppy and mouse for his daughters and naming them Warden. As they go inside the house, Sully's wife looks up at the night sky, leaving us to wonder what else might lie amongst the stars.

== Cast ==
- Eric Roberts as Lieutenant Mike "Sully" Sullivan
- John Rhys-Davies as Lieutenant Wyznowski
- James W. Quinn as Yamata
- Sarah Katie Coughlan as Mrs. Sullivan
- Arnold Vosloo as The Warden
- Saulius Siparis as The Hunter
- Sophie Bielders as Kathleen Sullivan

== Reception ==
Video Store Magazine commended the film's "witty and withering banter between Roberts, Quinn, and Rhys-Davies, plenty of action and explosions and an attack on a police station by the hunter" recalling the first Terminator movie. Dread Central was more negative, saying "The Hunter is one of the least compelling alien villains I've seen in quite some time", criticizing his "zero personality" and uninteresting space weaponry.

== See also ==
- List of films featuring extraterrestrials
