= Bigfoot (2009 film) =

- Directed by: Kevin S. Tenney
- Screenplay by: Sandy Schklair
- Produced by: Osama Bastaki; Angie Everhart; Jess Mancilla; George Shamieh; Tony Tamraz; Richard Tyson
- Starring: Richard Tyson; Adam B. Raque; Nicole Badaan; Kenyon R. Dudley; Angie Everhart
- Cinematography: Jayson Crothers
- Edited by: Brett Hudland
- Music by: Jamie Christopherson
- Release date: October 6, 2009
- Running time: 92 minutes
- Country: United States
- Language: English
- Budget: $1,000,000

Bigfoot (known as The Kids That Saved Bigfoot in the United Kingdom) is a 2009 American comedy adventure film directed by Kevin S. Tenney with a screenplay by Sandy Schklair. The film stars Richard Tyson, Angie Everhart, Adam Racque, Nicole Badaan, and Kenyon Dudley. It was released on October 6, 2009.

== Plot ==
Percy Caldwell is a teenage boy who lives in Pine Bluffs, California. He is in love with Madison, his high school's most popular cheerleader, but his best friend Leonard doesn't think he stands a chance. One day, after Percy rescues Madison from two local bullies, brothers named Cletis and Devlin, the brothers knock his bicycle off the road with their truck, and Percy ends up crashing in the woods, falling unconscious.

When Percy wakes up, he sees an eight-foot-tall Bigfoot standing over him. Percy is initially scared, but the creature seems friendly and interacts with him. Then, Percy rushes home where he tells his parents but they do not believe him.

The next day, Madison thanks Percy for saving her from the bullies; kissing him and declaring him her boyfriend. After school, Percy goes to see the Sasquatch in the woods and they share a picnic. Cletis and Devlin, who are going bear hunting, hear the Sasquatch belch from a distance and mistake him for a Grizzly bear. Percy hears the hunters and tells the Sasquatch to flee. When the brothers find Percy they threaten him, and Bigfoot comes to Percy's rescue; throwing the brothers down a hill. After that, the brothers start planning to catch the creature to sell for big money.

The next morning Percy goes back into the woods for another picnic with Bigfoot. When he gets home, Madison arrives. While they are watching King Kong, Percy tells Madison about his encounters with the Sasquatch but she doesn't believe him and begins to have doubts about him. Meanwhile, Cletis and Devlin are building a cage for the Sasquatch in their barn.

The following day, Percy tells Madison and Leonard to follow him to go see the Sasquatch, but Madison then decides that their relationship is over and she leaves. Leonard, however, agrees to go with him.

When Percy and Leonard arrive in the woods, they find Cletis and Devlin trying to capture Bigfoot. Percy tells the creature to flee but the Sasquatch won't go. The brothers shoot Bigfoot with a tranquillizer gun but he manages to chase them back to their truck. However, he then falls asleep, from the dart, in the back of the truck. Leonard snaps a picture of Bigfoot before Cletis and Devlin drive away with the creature.

Percy and Leonard meet with Madison, and when Leonard shows her the picture of Bigfoot she agrees to show them where the brothers live and to give Percy another chance. They all cycle to Cletis and Devlin's farm and watch the brothers going to and from the barn. When the coast is clear, they go in and find Bigfoot locked in a cage which they attempt to open; but just as they get the cage unlocked the brothers return. Bigfoot then throws the brothers to the ground, and the teenagers escape with Bigfoot. They drive off in the brother's truck while Cletis and Devlin wake up and follow them in Cletis's car, armed with rifles.

During the chaos, Bigfoot throws the truck's spare tire at the windshield of the brothers' car, and they retaliate by attempting to shoot the tires of the truck. Their bullet accidentally hits Bigfoot, causing a life-threatening injury. The teenagers take Bigfoot to Percy's father, who is a surgeon, and he removes the bullet and saves Bigfoot's life. They then take Bigfoot back to the forest. However, Cletis and Devlin have been following them in their car and start shooting at them but Bigfoot pushes their car off the road. As it spins over, the brothers escape and Cletis waves goodbye to Bigfoot, much to Devlin's annoyance.

Bigfoot is taken to his original forest home, which he was forced to leave after a recent forest fire, and they see him meeting with another Sasquatch, who they think may be his girlfriend. The movie ends with Percy telling the Sasquatch goodbye as they part ways.

== Cast ==
- Adam Raque as Percy Caldwell
- Richard Tyson as David Caldwell, Percy's father
- Angie Everhart as Brooke Caldwell, Percy's mother
- Kenyon Dudley as Leonard, Percy's best friend
- Nicole Badaan as Madison, Percy's girlfriend
- Jean Louise O'Sullivan as Lisa, a friend of Madison
- Andrew Chase as Devlin, Percy's enemy
- Brandon Gibson as Cletis, Devlin's brother
- Leslie Wong as News Reporter

== Reception ==
Writing for DVD Talk, Justin Felix considered Bigfoot to be a "light-hearted comedy" but he was concerned that "the depiction of antagonists Cletis and Devlin certainly flirts with some ugly stereotypes of rural whites. They're uneducated, carry rifles, drive a pickup and live in a rundown shack". He noted that they were referred to as 'rednecks' several times and was also troubled by "the economic class issue. Cletis and Devlin are clearly poor while the hero teenagers are blatantly wealthy". Felix concluded that Bigfoot "might be worth a look if you've got young kids wanting something new to watch, otherwise you can pass on this one."

Joly Herman at Common Sense Media found Bigfoot to be "Surprisingly good for a movie with B-list actors, this family film has some tender and laugh-out-loud moments." Herman noted that "the earnestness with which Adam Raque's Percy approaches the monster is reminiscent of moments in E.T.". Herman praised the script and the "comic bumbling issued from the bad guys" and concluded that "Parents might enjoy watching this one as much as their kids do."
