= Turning Points of History =

Canadian television series

Turning Points of History is a Canadian television series produced by History Television since 1997. Each episode focuses on a significant point in history. The series was narrated by Cedric Smith. Among the various historical topics covered are Juno Beach, polio, and bush pilots.
