= The Resurrected =

1991 film directed by Dan O'Bannon

- Promotional release poster
- Directed by: Dan O'Bannon
- Written by: Brent V. Friedman
- Based on: The Case of Charles Dexter Ward by H. P. Lovecraft
- Produced by: Mark Borde; Kenneth Raich
- Starring: John Terry; Jane Sibbett; Chris Sarandon; Robert Romanus
- Cinematography: Irv Goodnoff
- Edited by: Russell Livingstone
- Music by: Richard Band
- Distributed by: Scotti Bros. Pictures; Live Home Video
- Release dates: October 19, 1991 (Sitges); April 15, 1992 (U.S.)
- Running time: 108 minutes
- Countries: Canada; United States
- Language: English
- Budget: $5 million

The Resurrected (also known as The Ancestor and Shatterbrain) is a 1991 Canadian supernatural horror film directed by Dan O'Bannon, and starring John Terry, Jane Sibbett, Chris Sarandon, and Robert Romanus. It is an adaptation of the H. P. Lovecraft novella The Case of Charles Dexter Ward. Originally intended for a theatrical release, the film was shown at various film festivals before being released direct-to-video in 1992.

== Plot ==
Claire Ward hires private investigator John March to look into the increasingly bizarre activities of her husband Charles Dexter Ward, an esteemed Rhode Island chemical engineer. Through a series of conversations with John, Claire reveals Charles's recent unexplained isolation in their carriage house, his sudden uncovering of his family history, and their visitation to an abandoned ancestral farmhouse near Pawtuxet where he found a painting of a man named Joseph Curwen, to whom he bears an uncanny resemblance. Since these events, Charles has purchased and moved into the farmhouse, leaving Claire without explanation.

Upon investigating, John finds that numerous deliveries are made to the farmhouse, and inquires about them to Charles, who is evasive; Charles explains that he is undertaking routine chemical tests using animal cadavers. Shortly after, an elderly man in a neighboring home is found brutally murdered, only a few remnants of his bones left in the house. Police assume he was attacked and eaten by an animal, but John is skeptical. Claire and John go to visit Charles together, and find him pallid and speaking with an archaic affect. They attempt to extract an explanation from Charles, but he simply tells them he is on "the edge of greatness", and that in six weeks' time, they will understand.

Claire agrees to have Charles committed to a hospital. Doctors find his metabolism to be inexplicably high, triggering ravenous hunger, and attribute his change in demeanor to hormonal issues; however, they are unable to explain his craving for blood and raw meat. Meanwhile, John uncovers a diary in the carriage house from Ezra Ward, Charles's fifth-great grandfather, dated 1771. The diary explains how Ezra had an affair with Joseph's wife Eliza, and that Joseph had been practicing necromancy in catacombs he constructed on his property. After a flood penetrated the catacombs, the townspeople discovered a grotesquely malformed creature in the river, which they burned alive. The diary ends leading up to the townspeople's raid of the Curwen house, and Eliza's admission to Ezra that she was pregnant with Joseph's child; Claire, John, and John's assistant Lonnie surmise that Charles's biological great-grandfather was actually Joseph, not Ezra.

John and Lonnie decide to search for catacombs on the farmhouse property with Claire. They uncover the entrance in the house's basement, and inside the catacombs find a laboratory and half-grown creatures in wells; Claire also discovers Charles's briefcase. They attempt to flee but are attacked, and Lonnie is killed by one of the creatures. John leaves a bomb in the catacombs, and he and an injured Claire escape with the briefcase before the house detonates. John takes Claire to the hospital where she is sedated, and the doctor informs him she is pregnant.

John goes to visit Charles in the psychiatric institution, and confronts him with the briefcase, which he discovered filled with human bones. He accuses Charles of in fact being the 250-year-old Joseph Curwen, who successfully found a way to conquer death through his necromantic experiments. Joseph admits his identity, and confesses that the bones in the suitcase are those of Charles, whom Joseph killed after Charles raised him from the dead. He explains his plan to regain his health and eventually be discharged from the hospital, after which he can impersonate Charles. Joseph attempts to cannibalize John, but John pours the restorative potion from the laboratory over Charles's bones. Charles's skeleton reanimates, and begins to tear the flesh off Joseph, before the two disappear in a cosmic explosion.

== Cast ==
- John Terry as John March
- Jane Sibbett as Claire Ward
- Chris Sarandon as Charles Dexter Ward / Joseph Curwen
- Robert Romanus as Lonnie Peck
- Charles K. Pitts as Ezra Ward
- Megan Leitch as Eliza
- Lauren Briscoe as Holly Tender
- Ken Camroux-Taylor as Captain Ben Szandor
- Patrick Pon as Raymond
- Bernard Cuffling as Dr. Waite

== Production ==
=== Development ===
Director O'Bannon and screenwriter Brent V. Friedman had developed the Lovecraft property independently of each other. Friedman's version of the script was titled Shatterbrain. While Friedman receives sole writing credit, O'Bannon did incorporate some of his own ideas into the project. O'Bannon's original title for the film was The Ancestor, which was later changed to The Resurrected after being re-cut and altered by the studio for theatrical release. The film was O'Bannon's second project as a director after 1985's The Return of the Living Dead and his final directorial credit before his death in 2009.

=== Filming ===
Principal photography occurred in 1990 in Vancouver, British Columbia.

== Release ==
The Resurrected was shown in 1991 in the Official Selection at the Sitges Film Festival in Catalonia, Spain. The film was given a short-lived theatrical release on June 1, 1991. It was then released direct to video on April 15, 1992 by Live Home Video in the United States. It was later released on DVD internationally through Metro Goldwyn Mayer in 2003, and in the United States through Lionsgate in 2005.

Scream Factory released the film on Blu-ray on September 12, 2017. A 4K UHD Blu-ray was released by Vinegar Syndrome in September 2025, made available in their online store.

== Reception ==
In their book Lurker in the Lobby: A Guide to the Cinema of H. P. Lovecraft, Andrew Migliore and John Strysik write: "The Resurrected is the best serious Lovecraftian screen adaptation to date, with a solid cast, decent script, inventive direction, and excellent special effects that do justice to one of [Lovecraft's] darker tales."

== Sources ==
- Migliore, Andrew; Strysik, John (2006). Lurker in the Lobby: A Guide to the Cinema of H. P. Lovecraft. Portland, Oregon: Night Shade Books. ISBN 978-1-892-38935-0.
- Smith, Dan G. (2005). H.P. Lovecraft in Popular Culture: The Works and Their Adaptations in Film, Television, Comics, Music and Games. Jefferson, North Carolina: McFarland & Company. ISBN 978-0-786-42091-9.
