= Telescene Film Group =

Former Canadian production studio

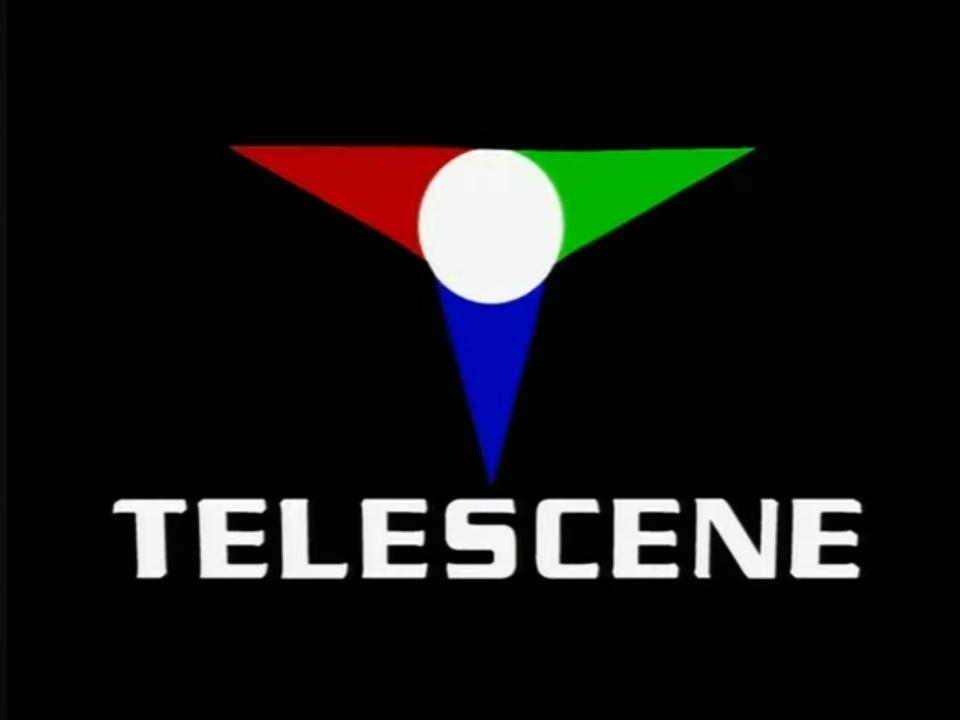
- Formerly: Telescene Films Inc (1986–1990): Telescene Film Group Inc. (1990–1994); Telescene Communications Inc. (1994)
- Industry: Film
- Founded: 1977; 49 years ago
- Founder: Neil Leger
- Defunct: January 2001
- Fate: Bankruptcy
- Successor: CinéGroupe
- Headquarters: 5510 Ferrier, Montreal, Quebec, Canada
- Key people: Robin Spry (president) and Jamie Brown (vice-president)
- Products: Motion pictures

Telescene Film Group, commonly referred to as simply Telescene (stylized as TELESCENE), was a Canadian film production and distribution company based in Montreal, Québec. Founded in 1977, the company evolved into an established independent producer of filmed media, expanding its work throughout the 1980s and 1990s, before its shutdown in 2001. In January 2001, the company entered a joint venture with Canadian animation studio CinéGroupe. The company was initially created by Neil Leger alongside Canadian film director Robin Spry.

Notable television series produced by Telescene Film Group include: Big Wolf on Campus, The Hunger, and Student Bodies. Prominent films include: Hiroshima, Witchboard III: The Possession, and Going to Kansas City. The company produced works in a variety of genres and media. In 1997, Telescene helped establish 'The Action Adventure Network' along with Richmel Productions and Goodman/Rosen Productions.

== History ==
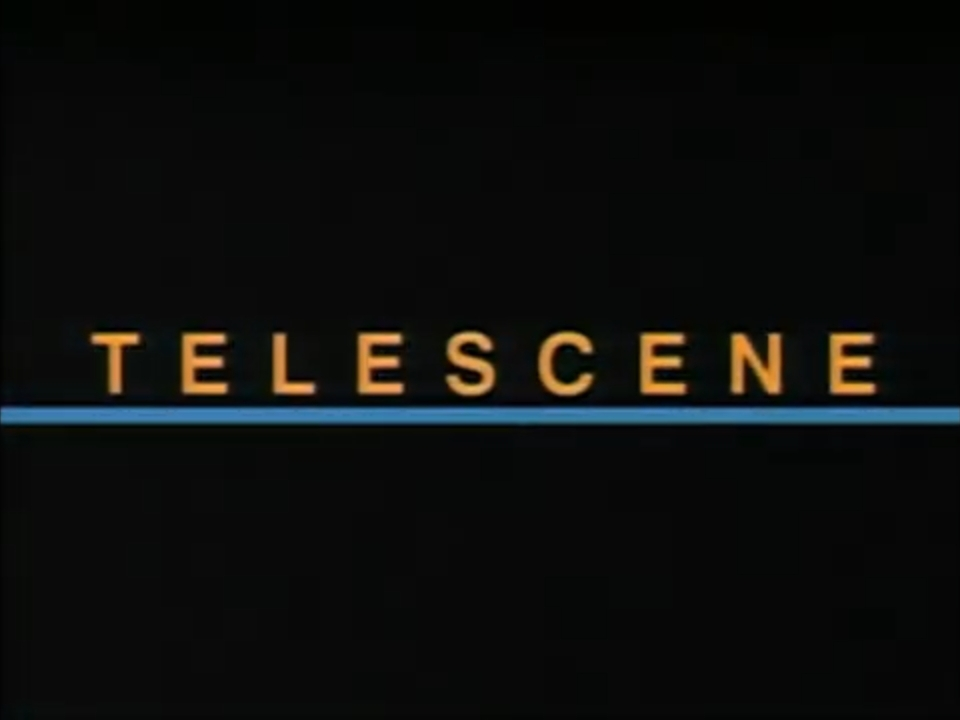
The original logo of Telescene Film Group (1991 - 1994)

Telescene was founded in 1977 by Neil Leger. Leger would serve as the president of the company, assisted by vice-president Robin Spry, who played a crucial role in the company's creation.

In 1986, the company was divided into three divisions. During this period, the company went under the title "Telescene Films Inc.", with the studio relocating to a facility on Saint-Paul Street.

In 1989, the studio discontinued its commercial production to focus on filmmaking. Additionally, the company moved its workspaces to Mount Royal. Leger would also depart from the company, according to Executive Vice President Jamie Brown; his leave was "amicable."

By 1990, the company had altered its name again to "Telescene Film Group Inc." and Jamie Brown obtained secondary vice-president status.

In 1994, the company adopted the name "Telescene Communications Inc.," and Robin Spry, who succeeded Leger subsequent to his departure, officially became president.

In 1997, Telescene partnered with Richmel Productions and Goodman/Rosen Productions to launch the $200 million CAD 'The Action Adventure Network', producing original action-adventure programming for which DirecTV acquired exclusive rights to content.

In 2000, Telescene faced numerous financial difficulties, including a halt of access to bank credit for production purposes, a bank debt exceeding $70 million CAD, and declining cash flow. These problems culminated in the company filing for bankruptcy on December 1st under the Canadian Bankruptcy and Insolvency Act. Although the company filed for bankruptcy protection, it continued limited operations during restructuring and entered a production and distribution joint venture with CinéGroupe in early 2001, beginning with the third season of Big Wolf on Campus. CinéGroupe held an 80% stake, while Telescene retained 20%.

== Library ==
The following is a selected list of known productions from Telescene, compiled from online databases and other archives.

=== Commercials ===
Telescene Film Group previously produced commercials before the studio's distance from the media in 1989. Following this shift, the company transferred focus toward television series and film development.

=== Series ===
Title	Year(s)	Production partner	Network
Urban Angel	1991-93	CBC, Téléfilm Canada	CBC Television
Sirens	1993-95	—	ABC, Broadcast syndication
The Hunger	1997-2000	Alliance Films, Scott Free Productions, The Movie Network	Sci Fi Channel, Showtime
Student Bodies	1997-1999	Sunbow Productions	YTV, Global, Showcase
The Lost World	1999-2002	Coote Hayes Productions, St. Clare Entertainment, The Over the Hill Gang	TNT, DirecTV, Broadcast syndication
Big Wolf on Campus	1999-2002	CinéGroupe, Saban Entertainment	YTV, Fox Family
Misguided Angels	1999	—	—
Live Through This	2000-01	—	MTV

=== Films ===
Title	Release date	Production partner
Malarek	1988	Téléfilm Canada
Salt on Our Skin	1992	Torii Production, Neue Constantin Film
A Cry in the Night	1992	Caméras Continentales, Canal+, M6, France 2, Gemini Film, First Choice Canadian Communication Corporation, CNC
Weep No More, My Lady	1992	Caméras Continentales, Canal+, France 2, M6, Rysher Entertainment
Double Vision	1992	Caméras Continentales, Canal+, Films A2, Gemini Film, M6, Métropole Télévision
Terror Stalks the Class Reunion	1992	Caméras Continentales, Canal+, France 2, M6, Gemini Film
Hiroshima	1995	Cine Bazar
Witchboard III: The Possession	1995	Blue Rider Pictures
On Dangerous Ground	1996	Centurion, Carousel, Vision View Entertainment
Midnight Man	1997	Centurion, Carousel, Vision View Entertainment
Thunder Point	1998	Vision View Entertainment
Going to Kansas City	1998	Mandart Entertainment
Escape from Wildcat Canyon	1998	Showtime Networks, Cypress Point Productions, Gemini Film
Fearless	1999	Campic Productions, South Pacific Pictures
Dr. Jekyll and Mr. Hyde	2000	—
Nightmare Man	2000	Isambard Productions Ltd.
The Lost World: Underground	2002	Coote Hayes Productions, St. Clare Entertainment
Matthew Blackheart: Monster Smasher	2002	—
