= Peacemaker (1990 film) =

- DVD cover
- Directed by: Kevin Tenney
- Written by: Kevin Tenney
- Produced by: Wayne Crawford; Andrew Lane
- Starring: Robert Davi; Lance Edwards; Robert Forster
- Cinematography: Tom Jewett
- Edited by: Daniel Duncan
- Music by: Dennis Michael Tenney
- Distributed by: Fries Entertainment
- Release date: 2 July 1990
- Running time: 100 minutes
- Country: United States
- Language: English

Peacemaker is a 1990 American science fiction action film written and directed by Kevin Tenney, and produced by Wayne Crawford and Andrew Lane. The film follows a doctor who becomes involved in a conflict between two extraterrestrials. Peacemaker stars Robert Davi, Lance Edwards, and Robert Forster.

== Plot ==
An alien spacecraft is seen entering the Earth's atmosphere near Los Angeles and crashing into the Pacific Ocean. The event is witnessed by a couple at a nearby beach. Shortly after her partner leaves to investigate the site of the crash, the woman is startled by the appearance of a strange man, who disappears as soon as her boyfriend runs back in reaction to her screams.

Meanwhile, the stranger (Lance Edwards), apparently the traveler who survived the crash, makes his way to the city, finds a police cruiser and attempts to steal a shotgun but is caught doing so by a police officer. In trying to arrest him, the officer is thrown over five feet by one punch by the stranger, into the cruiser's windshield while being handcuffed which alerts the other officer who arrives to help and fires his weapon only to see the stranger fall and, immediately, rise and run away. During the pursuit, the stranger hurdles over and clears a high wooden fence and runs into a heavy wooden door only to be momentarily stopped. Upon which he runs into and breaks down the door with his body.

Running to elude the police, he rushes into an apartment that is occupied by several people. When they pull out knives to defend themselves, the stranger attacks them, throwing the woman through the apartment door when the police officers arrive. The officers stare inside as the stranger makes short work of the two men, throwing one through a wall. When the officers fire on him, he crashes through a window and falls to the ground. When they descend to inspect the body, the stranger rises screaming; they fire, apparently killing him.

Later, the stranger's body is taken to the medical examiner. At the same time, a man, (Robert Forster), monitoring the police, hears of the spacecraft crashing and a possible suspect killed and sent to the morgue, and rushes out of his seedy apartment with a .44 Magnum revolver in hand.

The stranger's body is about to be examined by Asst. Medical Examiner Dori Caisson, (Hilary Shepard), when she sees that the bullet holes on his body start to glow and his skin miraculously heal; the stranger rises from the autopsy table and seizes her. As they leave, they're stopped by the security guard, Moses, (Wally Taylor), who is attacked by the stranger and is rendered unconscious. The stranger forces Dori out to the roof parking lot and into her car. It's then that the man from the apartment rushes up and aims his gun at the stranger who yells out the man's name (which sounds like "Yates", which is the man's name in the Alien's language). With Yates firing his gun at him, the stranger, who's at the steering wheel, drives forward, and abruptly starts into reverse, at high speed, toward Yates knocking him over the side of the building where he lands into a tree, severely injured. Yates runs off where he brakes into a closed library and he begins to heal in the same manner as the stranger.

At the Examiner's Office, the guard is questioned by Detective Sergeant Frank Ramos (Robert Davi), with the Chief Medical Examiner, "Doc", (Bert Remsen) present. He explains that Dori was kidnapped by one of the "corpses" who attacked him and fled with her. Ramos does not believe Moses, but Doc tells him that the body of the stranger, who was killed by the police officers, is missing.

Dori and the stranger end up at her home where he forces her into a chair and turns on her TV and radio to listening to all the programs. When Dori attempts to call the police while the stranger is distracted, he catches her and ties her up with a telephone cord; they later fall asleep. The next day Dori awakes to find the stranger wearing her late husband's clothes. When she ask why he's wearing them she was surprised to find the stranger say "Forgive me, I was cold."

Saying that she did not believe that he understood her, he remarked that he could not until he had listened to all the television programmes. Dori remarked that he was not from around here to which he said "No. I'm from another planet". Still shocked after thinking he was dead, the stranger wondered why Dori thought he was dead because he had not begun to decompose. Dori stated that his injuries where fatal to humans. The stranger explained that his kind regenerate their major organs and die only after they suffer massive damage to their brain. When the stranger inquired as to humans, Dori wryly says, "No, we just go to work for the Department of Motor Vehicles". Baffled by the joke because his kind do not joke nor understand them, Dori tricks the stranger and escapes only to be caught at her car with her behind the steering wheel. Attempting to flee, she threaten to run him over. The stranger stops her by putting his foot on her car's bumper as she tries running him down.

Dori pleaded with him to let her go. The stranger stated that he needs her to get his clothing for his crashed ship to lift off because the control card was in them and that he must return to his world because he is a "Peacemaker". "A policeman". Surprised and upset, Dori asked his name. He said "Townsend". Looking a little disappointed Dori said, "I thought your name would be Darth Vader or something".

Meanwhile, Yates is caught by the police, that day, in the Library and handcuffed. He then shears off his hand that was cuffed and escapes. Going to a phone booth, Yates finds Dori's address. Dori and Townsend, finding that the police was looking for them and that they could not get to the control card return to Dori's home to find Yates waiting and he attacks them. Knocking out Dori and damaging her home, Yates flees, with Townsend chasing him. Yates steals a pickup truck. With Townsend in the back of the truck they fight over control of it. Dori is discovered by Ramos at her home and is notified that Townsend and Yates were seen and that police cruisers was dispatched to stop them. After crashing through roadblocks and high-speed police chases, the truck swerves and explodes into flames.

Later that day, Ramos questions Dori at the police station about the attack on her and why Townsend, apparently not dead, kidnapped her. She said that she could not say positively why he was not dead but that both Yates and Townsend were possibly high on and drugs and that fooled her and cause the attack. Ramos, not believing but having no other explanation, lets Dori go.

Dori goes to her destroyed home only be captured by Yates who takes her to a deserted location. With wounds, Yates tells Dori that he is a Peacemaker and that Townsend was sent to kill someone who was in his world's Witness Protection. As Yates regenerates he tells Dori that when he joked with her, he could because he had lived on Earth for over 20 years and that if Townsend had a black card with him he needed it because it had the identity of Townsend's victim. Dori, somewhat believing, returns to her home only to be captured by Townsend this time, who take her to a motel and now tries to convince her that Yates is lying and is a serial killer he was pursuing when they entered a "black hole" together. Before Dori could have the chance to believe him a S.W.A.T team surrounds the motel with Ramos in charge. Ordering Townsend to surrender, Townsend, dragging Dori, escapes by going through the walls into adjacent rooms and steals a motel patron's car.

Still not being sure and Townsend having a gun, Dori helps Townsend find a cheap hotel to hold up but has second thoughts about him and she escapes him by running over him in a delivery van. Townsend hangs on but is scraped from underneath the van after holding onto the tailpipe. Dori finds Yates and take him to Townsend. Townsend, surprised at Dori, faces Yates who suddenly turns his gun on Dori and threaten to kill her if Townsend did not surrender the control card. Dori, surprised, as well, asked "How could you both have traveled here and arrived differently?" Yates sarcastically said that "We entered the black hole at the same time but we came out 20 years apart". Still threatening Dori, Yates starts to torture her. Townsend relents and lays down his shotgun.

Looking at Townsend, Yates tells him to open his jacket, where Townsend has a "nasty scar". Telling Yates he got it by being run over by a van, Yates mockingly jokes, "You do look a little 'run down'" and turns to Dori and says mockingly, "A joke". With Yates distracted, Townsend attacks him and both fight. Yates gets the upper hand, however, and has Townsend dangling from a terrace. Dori, seeing Townsend, attacks Yates, but he hits her and places the muzzle of the gun in her mouth to kill her. Townsend, still dangling, reaches into his wound and produces a .38 caliber revolver and fires it into Yates' head, where he falls onto electric wires, bursts into flames and falls to the ground, where he explodes and decomposes in less than 20 seconds.

The commotion brings Ramos to the hotel and finds Dori with Townsend's body. Ramos ask what happen and how did Townsend die this time. Dori came up with a plausible explanation to where Ramos ask "Is that the truth?" Dori's only answer is "Well, it's my story and i'm sticking to it".

Later, at the Medical Examiner's, Dori opens the vault that holds Townsend's body and looks down on him. He opens his eyes and looks at her. She smiles and, holding the control card she says "Surf's Up". On the beach, Dori knowing that Townsend was going to try for his ship, with her head hanging down, she tells him "Why do you even have to try?" Townsend remarks, "Because I am a Peacemaker!" Dori, at last says "I wish I could say a joke about now." Townsend, sadly says "Why? I would not understand it, anyway."

== Cast ==
- Robert Forster as Yates
- Lance Edwards as Townshend
- Hilary Shepard as Dr. Dori Caisson
- Robert Davi as Det. Sgt. Frank Ramos
- Bert Remsen as Doc
- John Denos as Det. Rieger
- Wally Taylor as Moses
- Kyra Stempel as Susan
- Garth Le Master as Chris
- Rob Zapple as S.W.A.T. Commander
- Neil Summers as Milkman
- Robby Robinson as Junkie #1
- Sharon Schaffer as Junkie #2
- Irving E. Lewis as Junkie #3
- Clyde Talley II as Patrolman
- Jack W. Thompson as Patrolman
- Chuck Courtney as Patrolman
- Jerry Spicer as Patrolman
- Sandy Sachs as Patrolwoman
- Wally Rose as Wino

== Production ==
Kevin Tenney wrote and directed Peacemaker as despite his association with horror films, Tenney had always wanted to direct action adventure films.
