= The Cellar (1989 film) =

- Promotional release poster
- Directed by: Kevin Tenney
- Screenplay by: John Woodward
- Story by: John Woodward; Darryl Wimberley
- Based on: "The Cellar" by David Henry Keller
- Produced by: Steve Berman; Patrick Wells; John Woodward
- Starring: Patrick Kilpatrick; Chris Miller; Suzanne Savoy; Ford Rainey
- Cinematography: Tom Jewett
- Edited by: Sally Allen
- Music by: Dave Borden; Josh Kaplan; Harry Maslin; Pat Rettig; Donovan Stark; Will Sumner
- Production company: Indian Neck Entertainment
- Distributed by: Filmstar
- Release date: November 4, 1989 (Japan)
- Running time: 85 minutes
- Country: United States
- Language: English

The Cellar is a 1989 American monster film directed by Kevin Tenney, based on a short story by David Henry Keller. It stars Patrick Kilpatrick, Chris Miller, Suzanne Savoy, and Ford Rainey.

== Plot ==
Comanche Indians have trapped the evil of their land in a monster made up of a mixture of other animals. The Comanche have placed a protective spear in the ground to contain the evil, along with a rabbit foot talisman for good luck. A young boy pulls the spear from the ground while pocketing the talisman. He starts to play with the spear. A Comanche catches the boy, and startled, he runs away with the rabbit's foot. The Native American places the spear back, realizing too late that the rabbits foot is now gone. After that, white men come and start drilling for oil.

Skip to current time, a divorced father, Mance Cashen, moves to the area with his new wife and baby. His son from his first marriage, Willy, is visiting. Willy notices something peculiar in the house and tries to warn his father and step-mother. They do not believe him. Willy is attacked while on a tire swing over a small water hole. The creature grabs his foot and Willy struggles, eventually getting away. He eventually befriends the local drunk, T. C. van Houten, the same man who rented the house to Mance and his wife. A nice old man with some bad memories who knows something about the evil near the oil well and was in a situation similar to Willy's.

In the meantime a Comanche Indian chief, Chief Sam John, comes to warn Mance of the evil and the need to keep it contained. Sam John informs Mance the evil was originally intended to stop the white man, but it is indiscriminate in whom it kills instead. Mance will have none of it. Willy eventually takes a spear he finds on his property to Sam John and tries to find out what is going on. Sam John convinces Willy to promise to stay out of the cellar and come get him if anything happens. Sam John is later dragged into the cellar by the monster.

Willy, of course, has plans of his own and sets booby traps in the basement. He plans to trap it in sight so he can prove he is not lying. As he lays the traps the creature gives him a scare and Willy runs away. T. C. dies shortly after by the evil. Willy decides to be more bold and makes another trip to the basement in order to stop the monster. This time armed with a flame thrower, electrical cables, and a lucky rabbit’s foot. The monster interrupts him and Willy must run away again.

Willy takes Mance's ex-boss's son, Tommy Boatwright, with him to the water hole in order to set up bait for the monster. Tommy falls in and the monster eats him. The police suspect foul play from Mance on account of him being fired. While looking for his son, under the impression he has merely run away, Tommy's father, Kyle goes into the cellar of the Cashen's house, but is caught in a bear trap that was meant for the creature and the creature itself kills Kyle. Having enough of Willy's 'lying', Mance locks Willy in the kitchen with the cellar door nailed open to scare him into reality only to find out Willy was telling the truth. Willy electrocutes the monster, saving his dad. But the monster is only stunned. Mance disappears and Willy, his step-mom, and the baby escape to the car. Mance escapes through the tunnels to the water hole. Willy grabs some dynamite and rigs it up to a toy car to kill the monster, but the explosives aren't working. Mance decides to once again go back to the cellar and hook up the explosives, barely escaping with his life. Mance and Willy blow the monster up together while escaping.

== Cast ==
- Patrick Kilpatrick as Mance Cashen
- Chris Miller as Willy Cashen
- Suzanne Savoy as Emily Cashen
- Ford Rainey as T.C. van Houten
- Lou Perryman as Kyle Boatwright (as Lou Perry)
- Michael Wren as Chief Sam John
- Danny Mora as Chilo
- Alex Pederson as Tommy Boatwright
- Don Collier as Sheriff
- Mindy Spence as Girl in Schoolyard
- Nick Gomez as Boy with Plane
- Irv Gorman as Tony Turner
- Bryson G. Liberty as Striking Eagle (as Bryson Liberty)
- Sid Dawson as Joe
- Patrick Wells as Earl
- Michael Crawley as T.C.'s Father

== Production ==
Director Kevin Tenney took over as director from original director John Woodward eight days into the film's shooting schedule.

== Release ==
The Cellar was released in the United States on VHS by Southgate Video in 1989, and in Canada that same year by Cineplex Odeon. In 2021, a 2K restoration of the film was released on Blu-ray by Vinegar Syndrome. In Germany was released as "Anthony II - Die Bestie kehrt zurück", without having no connection to The Kindred, which had been released as "Anthony". This happened because of promotional reasons.

== Reception ==
Critical reception has been generally favorable. Pop Horror's Tracey Allen reviewed the Vinegar Syndrome release, praising the film's restoration and script while criticizing its acting. The film was also reviewed in the McFarland book Horror Films by Subgenre, where the reviewer called it a "fun combination of supernatural threats and adolescent struggle that is reminiscent of Disney's darker live-action fairy tale fare".
