= Jane Sibbett =

American actress

- Born: Jane Moore Sibbett; November 28, 1962 (age 63); Berkeley, California, U.S.
- Education: University of California, Los Angeles
- Occupation: Actress
- Years active: 1985–present
- Spouse: Karl Fink (m. 1992; div. 2016)
- Children: 3

Jane Moore Sibbett (born November 28, 1962) is an American actress, producer, writer, and director. Her notable roles include Heddy Newman on the Fox television series Herman's Head and Carol Willick on the television series Friends.

== Early life ==
Sibbett was born on November 28, 1962, in Berkeley, California. She was the youngest of five children and was raised on Alameda Island, in the San Francisco Bay. Sibbett is a graduate of the University of California, Los Angeles, where she became a member of the California Delta chapter of Pi Beta Phi, an international women's fraternity.

== Career ==
Sibbett started her acting career as Jane Wilson on the NBC soap opera Santa Barbara in 1986–87, for which she was nominated for a Best Newcomer Soap Opera Digest Awards. In 1989, Sibbett won the role of Laurie Parr on the CBS comedy The Famous Teddy Z, co-starring with Jon Cryer and Alex Rocco. The series lasted one season. In 1991, Sibbett was cast as status-conscious bombshell Heddy Newman on the Fox sitcom Herman's Head, which quickly gained a cult following on the young broadcast network and lasted three seasons. Beginning in 1994, she played the occasional role of Carol Willick on Friends, a part-time stint that lasted until the end of the show's seventh season in 2001. During her Friends association, Sibbett had regular roles on the short-lived CBS sitcom If Not for You (1995), playing the jilted fiancée of her former Herman's Head co-star Hank Azaria, and in the second season of The WB's Nick Freno: Licensed Teacher (1997–98), playing school headmaster Dr. Katherine Emerson.

Sibbett has appeared in more than 200 episodes of multiple TV series, including 21 Jump Street and The Nanny. She starred in the 1998 movie Noah alongside Tony Danza and Wallace Shawn as well as in 1998's The Second Arrival, alongside Patrick Muldoon and Michael Sarrazin. Sibbett appeared in Dan O'Bannon's 1992 film The Resurrected. She also co-starred with Mary-Kate and Ashley Olsen in It Takes Two (1995), and the telefilm Au Pair (1999).

In 1996, Sibbett was offered the role of Debra Barone on Everybody Loves Raymond. CBS executives felt that she was right for the role and Sibbett signed a deal for the show; however, she vacated the role upon learning that star Ray Romano had not been informed, along with other key staff members, that she had been cast in the part. The role went to Patricia Heaton, who had been the first choice of Romano and show creator Philip Rosenthal.

Sibbett has co-starred in the movies Jessica Darling's It List (2016), Winter Wedding (2017), A Date By Christmas Eve (2019), the pilot Manopause (2020), and the 27th Annual Critics' Choice 2022 nominee List of a Lifetime (2021) directed by indie director Roxy Shih.

In 2019, Sibbett won the Michael D Publishers Award, a nonfiction writing scholarship to the Story Summit Writer's School, to complete the manuscript of her memoirs, About Jane. Sibbett also joined the Story Summit's group of faculty, supporting other burgeoning writers and served as the Chairperson for one year for its Storyteller Foundation.

== Philanthropy ==
Sibbett has long been an advocate for survivors of domestic violence, working with the nine shelters of 1736 Family Crisis Center in Los Angeles.

== Personal life ==
In 1989, Sibbett began dating Jon Cryer after working with him on The Famous Teddy Z.

In 1992, Sibbett married Karl Fink, a TV writer and producer who worked on the first two seasons of Herman's Head. Fink and Sibbett divorced in January 2016. They have three children together.

== Filmography ==
=== Film ===
Year	Title	Role	Notes
1990	Fear	Newscaster	
1991	The Resurrected	Claire Ward	
1995	It Takes Two	Clarice Kensington	
1998	Arrival II	Bridget Riordan	Direct-to-video
2002	Snow Dogs	Nana	Voice role
2008	Legacy	Mrs. Whittington	Direct-to-video

=== Television ===
Year	Title	Role	Notes
1985	Scarecrow and Mrs. King	Shawna	Episode: "A Little Sex, a Little Scandal"
1986	The Fall Guy	The Girl	Episode: "The Last Chance Platoon"
1986; 1987	Santa Barbara	Jane Wilson	118 episodes
1988	The Hogan Family	Melanie	Episode: "Help Wanted"
1988	My Two Dads	Ashley Bokowski	Episode: "My Fair Joey"
1988	Cheers	Kim Cooperman	Episode: "Norm, Is That You?"
1989	21 Jump Street	Louise	Episode: "The Dreaded Return of Russell Buckins"
1989–1990	The Famous Teddy Z	Laurie Parr	20 episodes
1990	Jake and the Fatman	Dana Ashford	Episode: "Only You"
1991	Quantum Leap	Diane Frost	2 episodes
1991–1994	Herman's Head	Heddy Newman	72 episodes
1992	Likely Suspects	Jody Morlock	Episode: "Addicted to Murder"
1994	Burke's Law	Meg Harden	Episode: "Who Killed Good Time Charlie?"
1994–2001	Friends	Carol Willick	15 episodes
1994	The Adventures of Brisco County, Jr.	Dianna Grayson	Episode: "Bad Luck Betty"
1995	Matlock	A.D.A. Katie Clark	Episode: "The Verdict"
1995	If Not for You	Melanie	7 episodes
1996	Touched by an Angel	Emily Houghton	Episode: "A Little Sex, a Little Scandal"
1997	Just in Time	Brenda Hyatt	Television film
1997	The Nanny	Morgan Faulkner / Marcy Feldman	Episode: "The Passed-Over Story"
1997–1998	Nick Freno: Licensed Teacher	Dr. Katherine Emerson	21 episodes
1998	Noah	Angela	Television film
1999	Au Pair	Vivian Berger	Television film
1999	It's Like, You Know...	Erika	Episode: "Coast to Coast"
2001	Sabrina the Teenage Witch	Robin Davis	Episode: "Witchright Hall"
2002	Ally McBeal	Beth Herman	Episode: "Heart and Soul"
2002	Once and Again	Jeannine Blue	2 episodes
2005	Buffalo Dreams	Blaine Townsend	Television film
2006	What About Brian	Tracy	Episode: "What About Secrets..."
2007	Out of Jimmy's Head	Ms. Shank	Episode: "Ghosts"
2010	Braco, The Golden Bridge	self	Video documentary
2016	Jessica Darling's It List	Mrs. Darling	Television film
2017	A Winter Wonderland	Marilyn Pierce	Television film
2019	A Date by Christmas Eve	Didi Dougherty	Television film
2021	List of a Lifetime	Dr. Brenda Boyer	Television film
