= Kevin S. Tenney =

American film director

- Born: October 16, 1955 (age 69); Honolulu, Hawaii, U.S.
- Occupation(s): Film director, screenwriter, film producer
- Years active: 1986–present

Kevin S. Tenney (born October 16, 1955) is an American film director, producer and screenwriter, best known for directing horror movies such as Witchboard (1986), and Night of the Demons (1988). He also wrote Night of the Demons 3 (1997).

== Biography ==
Tenney was born at the Hickam Air Force Base in Honolulu, Hawaii, where his father was stationed in the United States Air Force. He was primarily raised in Fairfield, California, where he graduated from Fairfield High School in 1973. He later studied filmmaking at the University of Southern California, but dropped out in his senior year when he began filming his feature debut, Witchboard (1987).

== Filmography ==
=== Film ===
| Year | Title | Writer | Producer | Director |
|---|---|---|---|---|
| 1984 | Book of Joe | Yes | No | Yes |
| 1986 | Witchboard | Yes | No | Yes |
| 1988 | Night of the Demons | No | No | Yes |
| 1989 | Witchtrap | Yes | Yes | Yes |
| 1989 | The Cellar | No | No | Yes |
| 1990 | Peacemaker | Yes | No | Yes |
| 1993 | Witchboard 2: The Devil's Doorway | Yes | No | Yes |
| 1995 | Witchboard III: The Possession | Yes | No | No |
| 1996 | Pinocchio's Revenge | Yes | No | Yes |
| 1997 | Night of the Demons 3 | Yes | No | No |
| 1997 | Demolition University | No | No | Yes |
| 1998 | Arrival II | No | No | Yes |
| 2000 | Tick Tock | Yes | No | Yes |
| 2003 | Endangered Species | Yes | No | Yes |
| 2007 | Brain Dead | No | Yes | Yes |
| 2009 | Bigfoot | No | No | Yes |
| 2009 | Night of the Demons | No | Yes | No |

==== Acting roles ====
| Year | Film | Role | Notes |
|---|---|---|---|
| 1988 | Night of the Demons | Customer in Convenience Store | Uncredited |
| 1989 | Witchtrap | Devon Lauder | |
| 1998 | Arrival II | Reporter | |
| 2003 | Endangered Species | Doctor | |
