= Jeanne de Brigue =

French soothsayer executed for witchcraft

- Died: 19 August 1391; Paris
- Cause of death: Burnt at the stake
- Other names: Jehenne de Brigue; Jehenna de Brigue; La Cordière

Jeanne de Brigue (died 19 August 1391) was a French soothsayer accused of witchcraft.

== Biography ==
Brigue originally from the Ardennes was accused of witchcraft, while still young, described as of childbearing age, and trialed in 1390. It was the first witch trial believed to be held at Le Châtelet in Paris. Local women who were known for having various healing powers or the ability to do magic were falling foul of the law and the church. Brigue was one of several women convicted of witchcraft. Her godmother, Jeanne, supposedly instructed her how to control the demon Haussibut while Marion her neighbor from Doue, Seine-et-Marne, taught her the art of divination. Brigue was said to be able to find lost objects and there were a number of witnesses called to describe events where she was involved in the return or identify to thefts.

She was condemned by Jean de Folleville, the Provost of Paris, to be burned at the Place du Marché aux Pourceaux. She died in 1391 in Paris.
