= Witchboard III: The Possession =

1995 film directed by Peter Svatek

- Promotional poster
- Directed by: Peter Svatek
- Screenplay by: Jon Ezrine; Kevin S. Tenney
- Story by: Jon Ezrine
- Produced by: Robin Spry
- Starring: David Nerman; Locky Lambert; Cedric Smith; Donna Sarrasin
- Cinematography: Barry Gravelle
- Edited by: Denis Papillon
- Music by: Richard Grégoire
- Production company: The Téléscéne Film Group
- Distributed by: The Téléscéne Film Group
- Release dates: December 5, 1995 (U.S.); February 16, 1996 (Montreal)
- Running time: 100 minutes
- Country: Canada
- Language: English
- Budget: C$1.5 million

Witchboard III: The Possession (released in some territories as Witchboard: The Possession) is a 1995 Canadian horror film directed by Peter Svatek and starring David Nerman, Elizabeth Lambert, Cedric Smith, Donna Sarrasin, and Danette MacKay. It is the second sequel to the film Witchboard (1986), following Witchboard 2: The Devil's Doorway (1993).

== Plot ==
Brian (David Nerman) is an unemployed broker who befriends his landlord Francis (Cedric Smith) only to find out that the old man is, in reality, a demon named Kral. After trapping Brian's soul via a Ouija board, Kral assumes Brian's identity and attempts to impregnate his wife Julie (Elizabeth Lambert). With the sudden change in Brian's personality, Julie begins to suspect that something is wrong, and, when she finds the demon's Ouija board, she contacts her husband. Discovering the truth, Julie tracks down Francis's ex-wife: the only person who can help her defeat the evil creature that has taken possession of her husband.

== Cast ==
- David Nerman as Brian
- Elizabeth Lambert as Julie
- Cedric Smith as Francis
- Donna Sarrasin as Lisa
- Danette MacKay as Dora
- Cas Anvar as Paramedic

== Release ==
After the first film, which was released theatrically, became popular on home video, the sequel was given a limited release, and the third film was released direct-to-video. Republic Pictures released it in the United States in December 1995. Téléscéne released it in Canada on February 16, 1996. International distribution was by Fries/Schultz Film Group.

== Production ==
Unlike the first two films, which were shot in California, this film was shot in Montreal, Quebec, Canada. Shooting started on December 7, 1994, and was scheduled to end on December 30. Kevin S. Tenney, the writer-director of the first two films, co-wrote the script for Witchboard III. Svatek said the script was delivered to him without previously having met Tenney. Some of the special effects were designed by KNB EFX Group, which is located in Los Angeles. To collaborate, Svatek and KNB traded faxes of designs. Elizabeth "Locky" Lambert was drawn to her character's active role in saving her husband rather than being a passive victim. Lambert said she was encouraged to give input about her character and felt the film's more exploitative elements were still tastefully done.

== Reception ==
Comparing it to the other films in the series, Fangoria called it "the weakest of the lot". The reviewer said it "moves along at a nice pace" but "never gets anywhere", focusing on poorly-done exploitation instead of horror. In rating it 2/5 stars, TV Guide wrote that although it "has moments of high energy", the film loses its focus and spends too much time on special effects and nudity. Daniel Kurland of Bloody Disgusting wrote that Witchboard III "likes to pile on its gore" in an entertaining way, but the scenes are nonsensical.
