= Witchboard 2: The Devil's Doorway =

1993 film by Kevin S. Tenney

- Original film poster
- Directed by: Kevin Tenney
- Written by: Kevin Tenney
- Produced by: Jeff Geoffray; Walter Josten
- Starring: Ami Dolenz; Timothy Gibbs; John Gatins; Laraine Newman
- Cinematography: David Lewis
- Edited by: Daniel Duncan
- Production company: Blue Rider Pictures
- Distributed by: Republic Pictures
- Release date: September 10, 1993
- Running time: 98 minutes
- Country: United States
- Language: English
- Budget: $2.5 million

Witchboard 2: The Devil's Doorway is a 1993 American supernatural horror film written and directed by Kevin Tenney. It stars Ami Dolenz as an artist possessed by a ghost of a former occupant of her new apartment. The film is a sequel to the 1986 film Witchboard, and was followed by Witchboard III: The Possession (1995). It was given a limited theatrical release in the United States on September 10, 1993.

== Plot ==
Paige, a young accountant, moves into a spacious loft apartment in Los Angeles, owned by Jonas and his eccentric wife, Elaine. Her police officer boyfriend, Mitch, is angry with her for moving out of his home, and dismisses her aspirations to work as an artist. In the closet, she discovers a Ouija board. While playing with the board, Paige begins receiving messages from an entity who claims to be named Susan. First, the board correctly predicts that Paige will receive a promotion at the accounting firm where she works. When Paige asks several tenants of the building, they tell her that a woman named Susan Sidney formerly lived in her apartment.

While Paige contacts Susan again with the Ouija, Jonas is attacked in his shop by a poltergeist that flings tools at him. He locks himself inside the boiler room, and is then incinerated when the boiler overheats. Paige begins suffering from nightmares that inspire her to produce several disturbing paintings of a woman she believes to be Susan. At Jonas's funeral, Russel, a photographer tenant of the building, informs Paige that Susan was an exotic dancer who prostituted herself to Jonas in exchange for rent. When Paige asks how Susan died, Russel tells that as far as he knows, she is alive, but that he has not seen her since she was evicted two years prior. Paige again consults the Ouija, and the entity insists it is Susan, and claims she was murdered.

Paige asks Mitch to search for records of Susan Sidney, but his search efforts produce no indication that she ever existed. When Paige vocally calls out the entity communicating through the Ouija, the shades of the loft windows all violently slam shut. Horrified, Paige is consoled by Russel and Elaine, who heard her screams. The three decide to use the Ouija together, attempting to communicate with Susan. The board directs them to "uptown"; in conversation, Mitch tells Paige that there is a remote area outside of the city known as Uptown Woods. Convinced Susan was killed and buried there, Paige has Russel bring her to the location, but they are startled by Mitch, who escorts her home.

Mitch is subsequently injured in a car accident in which his vehicle is hijacked by the entity. Meanwhile, Russel informs Paige that the Ouija board was used by witches throughout history to contact demons, and that this is likely what she is communicating with. Paige is insistent, however, that the entity is Susan. Russel points out the symptoms of "progressive entrapment", through which demons take control of victims via the Ouija; Paige exhibits several, including notable shifts in her behavior and temperament. However, Russel too becomes convinced that it is Susan when Paige produces an earring that belonged to her. Shortly after, Elaine is killed in a violent accident.

Paige realizes that the earlier message directing her to "uptown" was in fact intended to be "Upton", the name of Russel's photography company. Realizing that Russel murdered Susan, Paige attempts to flee from Russel, and locks herself in a bedroom. Russel tries to break the door down, but is stopped by Mitch, who has been discharged from the hospital; then it is revealed that the killer is Elaine and her accomplice is Jonas. Paige then emerges from the room, taking Susan's form. She throws Mitch through a window, but he manages to cling to a fire escape. Susan kills Russel with an axe just before Mitch manages to re-enter the apartment and find his body. He is confronted by Susan, who shapeshifts between herself and Paige. Susan attempts to murder Mitch, but he pleads for Paige to fight Susan's spirit; she does so and destroys the Ouija board, expelling Susan from her body.

== Cast ==
- Ami Dolenz as Paige
- Christopher Michael Moore as Jonas
- Laraine Newman as Elaine
- Timothy Gibbs as Mitch
- John Gatins as Russel
- Julie Michaels as Susan
- Sarah Kaite Coughlan as Carla
- Marvin Kaplan as Morris

Additionally, Kenny Rhodes and Todd Allen (from the first film) make cameos as the garbagemen.

== Production ==
Filming of Witchboard 2 took place on location in various parts of Los Angeles: The apartment in the film was a real artist's loft in Hollywood, while the accounting firm sequences were shot in a building in which director Tenney maintained his own private office.

== Release ==
The film was given a limited theatrical release in the United States through Blue Rider and Republic Pictures, opening on September 10, 1993 in cities including St. Louis, and Nashville, and Sacramento. It continued to screen in Detroit in October 1993.

=== Critical response ===
TV Guide awarded the film two out of five stars, writing: "An ordinary but nicely executed horror movie, Witchboard 2 suggests that the Ouija board is the Devil's Monopoly game. This modest chiller lacks the trashy sex and explicit violence die-hard buffs demand, but young couples searching for a make-out movie may give it two thumbs up."

=== Home media ===
Republic Pictures Home Entertainment released the film on VHS in late 1993. Olive Films released DVD and Blu-ray editions of the film on October 15, 2013.

== See also ==
- List of ghost films
