= Bertrand Guilladot =

Bertrand Guilladot (or Guillaudot; died 1743) was a French priest and an alleged sorcerer. Guilladot was among the last people to be executed for witchcraft in France. He was the central figure in the Lyon witch trials that lead to the execution of several men for witchcraft in Dijon and Lyon between 1742 and 1745.

== The case ==
The case was unusual, as witch trials, though still legal, had diminished in France since the Affair of the Poisons in 1680, and the execution of an alleged male sorcerer in Bordeaux in 1718 has traditionally been referred to as the last. However, a donkey-driver and the nobleman des Chauffors were in fact executed for the same crimes in Paris in 1724 and 1726 respectively.

Bertrand Guilladot was a Roman Catholic priest in Dijon. He was arrested in 1742, and put on trial charged with having made a pact with the Devil in order to find hidden treasures. He confessed to be guilty as charged. He was executed in 1743.

In his confession, he identified twenty-nine other individuals, all of them male, who reportedly had participated in the pact with him.

The witch trials begun by the denunciations in his confession were held in Lyon and lasted for three years.

In February 1745, five of the accused men were sentenced to death for witchcraft in connection to the treasure hunting. Three of the condemned were priests, who were accused of having performed sacrilegious masses for this purpose. One of the three condemned priests, Louis Debaraz, was sentenced to be executed by burning for having performed a black mass. Twenty-three of the remaining accused were sentenced to be galley slaves.
