= Witchboard =

1986 American horror film by Kevin S. Tenney

- Theatrical release poster
- Directed by: Kevin Tenney
- Written by: Kevin Tenney
- Produced by: Gerald Geoffray
- Starring: Todd Allen; Tawny Kitaen; Stephen Nichols; Kathleen Wilhoite; Burke Byrnes; Rose Marie
- Cinematography: Roy H. Wagner
- Edited by: Daniel Duncan; Stephen J. Waller
- Music by: Dennis Michael Tenney
- Production company: Paragon Arts International
- Distributed by: Cinema Group
- Release date: December 31, 1986
- Running time: 98 minutes
- Country: United States
- Language: English
- Budget: $1.5 million–2 million
- Box office: $7.4 million

Witchboard is a 1986 American supernatural horror film written and directed by Kevin Tenney in his directorial debut, and starring Tawny Kitaen, Stephen Nichols, and Todd Allen. The plot centers on college student Linda Brewster who becomes entranced into using her friend's Ouija board alone after it was left behind at her party. She is subsequently terrorized and eventually possessed by the spirit of malevolent serial killer Carlos Malfeitor, who committed a series of axe murders in the 1930s.

Tenney wrote the screenplay while a student at the University of Southern California, inspired after attending a party in which a friend brought a Ouija board for partygoers to use. The film focuses on the notion of "progressive entrapment," the process by which a malevolent entity or demon takes control of a human being, a theme that was also touched on in The Exorcist (1973) after Regan MacNeil (Linda Blair) dabbles with a Ouija board. Filming took place in 1985 in Los Angeles, San Bernardino, and San Francisco.

Cinema Group gave Witchboard a limited theatrical release in the United States on New Year's Eve 1986. Following favorable box-office returns, the release was expanded in the spring of 1987, and the film went on to gross $7.4 million in the United States. Although the critical response to the film was largely unfavorable, it has attracted a cult following since its release, and was subject to significant critical analysis by academic Carol J. Clover in her 1992 non-fiction book, Men, Women, and Chain Saws.

Two unrelated sequels, Witchboard 2: The Devil's Doorway and Witchboard III: The Possession, were released in 1993 and 1995, respectively. A remake directed by Chuck Russell was released in 2024.

== Plot ==
At a house party in Fairfield, California, Brandon Sinclair uses his ouija board with his ex-girlfriend Linda Brewster to contact the spirit of David, who he describes as a ten-year old child with whom he had communicated before. Her boyfriend, Jim Morar, insults David, which provokes him to slash the tires of Brandon's car. The next day, Linda uses Brandon's board that was left behind to contact David, who informs her where her lost engagement ring is. At the construction site where Jim works, his friend Lloyd Salvador is killed by fallen drywall. When Jim is questioned by Lieutenant Dewhurst at Lloyd's funeral, Linda contacts David about the accident, but he says that he did not cause it.

Linda begins to fall under progressive entrapment, where the spirit terrorizes the user enough to weaken them in order to possess them. She becomes increasingly preoccupied with communicating with David, and begins to experience nausea and other symptoms, leading her and Jim to believe she is pregnant. Brandon brings over psychic medium Sarah "Zarabeth" Crawford to contact David through a séance, and to exorcise him if necessary. Zarabeth channels David, who claims to be a ten-year-old boy. This further leads Linda to become protective of David and her communication with him. After the spirit leaves, a suspicious Zarabeth returns home to research the occurrence, but her throat is slashed before she is thrown through a window and lands on a sundial, impaling her to death. The next morning, Brandon hears about her death and suspects that David killed her, but Jim continues to be skeptical of his claims.

As Brandon leaves to seek information, Jim witnesses Linda violently thrown against the wall, rendering her unconscious. After she is brought to a hospital, doctors confirm Linda is not pregnant as they had suspected. Unnerved, Jim teams with Brandon to conduct research on David. The two find a newspaper article about a ten-year-old boy named David Simpson who drowned in a nearby lake. Jim and Brandon travel to the lake and use another board in an attempt to communicate with David, but soon learn that a different spirit, Carlos Malfeitor, has been terrorizing Linda all along. Seated on a dock, Jim is knocked unconscious when a stack of fishing barrels topples over him, and Brandon is killed by Malfeitor with a hatchet. Upon regaining consciousness, Jim grieves over Brandon's body. That night, he researches Malfeitor's biography, and learns that he was an axe murderer shot by police in his home in 1930—the same residence he and Linda live in.

After Linda discharges herself from the hospital, she is attacked by Malfeitor. The next day, Jim finds their home in disarray, before a possessed Linda attacks him. Dewhurst enters and accuses Jim of the murders, but Linda strikes him with a fire poker. Jim brandishes his revolver, and Linda tells him that he is the "portal", taunting him in an attempt to drive him to suicide. Instead, Jim shoots the board before he is pushed through a window and lands on a car.

After the events, Jim and Linda, now free from Malfeitor's influence, resume their lives and marry each other. Their landlady, Mrs. Moses, finds the board while cleaning out the home with her granddaughter, and wonders if it still works. The board is thrown into a box, where its planchette moves to the word "yes" by itself.

== Cast ==
- Todd Allen as Jim Morar
- Tawny Kitaen as Linda Brewster
- Stephen Nichols as Brandon Sinclair
- Kathleen Wilhoite as Sarah "Zarabeth" Crawford
- Burke Byrnes as Lt. Dewhurst
- James W. Quinn as Lloyd Salvador
- Rose Marie as Mrs. Moses
- Judy Tatum as Dr. Gelineau
- Gloria Hayes as Wanda
- J.P. Luebsen as Carlos Malfeitor
- Susan Nickerson as Chris
- Ryan Carroll as Roger
- Kenny Rhodes as Mike

== Production ==
=== Development ===
Kevin S. Tenney wrote the screenplay for Witchboard while studying filmmaking at the University of Southern California. He drew inspiration for the story from a party he attended where a friend brought a Ouija board for partygoers to use. While researching the history of the Ouija board, Tenney learned about the notion of "progressive entrapment", an element that figures briefly in The Exorcist (1973), in which the young Regan MacNeil (Linda Blair) becomes gradually "entrapped" by a demonic entity. As some elements of the script were based on incidents he had heard of while researching experiences close friends and others had with Ouija boards, he believed the material would resonate with viewers being based in facts, despite it being fictitious. Though Tenney never believed in the board himself, he admitted the board was "creepy".

One of the central themes of the film was the "bromance" of Jim Morar and Brandon Sinclair, whose friendship involved a love triangle with the character of Linda Brewster. Tenney viewed the film as being about the board, who he sees as a character, forcing Jim to reflect on his relationships with Linda and Brandon, the latter of whom he had a falling out with. Once he knew this was the story, it was easy for him to work it around with the incidents he had researched about. In writing the characters, he drew from his own background to make them "three-dimensional," and thought it would be interesting to see Jim's disestablished friendship with Brandon come back together. The character of Jim was based on Tenney himself, and he wrote him to be a construction worker from when he, his brother Dennis Michael Tenney, and their friend James W. Quinn worked in construction before moving to Los Angeles. He stated in interviews that despite it being a horror film, he sought to create a character-driven story.

When Tenney's friend, Rolan Carol, had to drop out of university due to financial issues, he found a job at a commodities firm where the owner, Walter Josten, was getting bored of commodities. Rolan mentioned Tenney's script to Josten, who had an interest in filmmaking. Tenney and his friend, Gerald Geoffray, then pitched the film to Josten, who was impressed by the idea, and agreed to help finance the project. Tenney dropped out of his program at the University of Southern California, four units shy of earning his master's degree, to begin shooting the film.

=== Casting ===
Todd Allen was cast as Jim, as Tenney felt he was the only one that was true to the role. Initially, Allen was worried that he lost the role when he saw Tenney laughing while sitting in the auditioning room, but he made him laugh because it reminded him of the way he talked and acted. He received the benefit of returning with the filmmakers to read the actresses that auditioned for the role of Linda, which Tawny Kitaen had read when he was not there.

Casting producer Rebecca Boss and Tenney found Kitaen ideal for the part as everyone the latter knew at his office, who were all male, noticed her the most. She had flown to New York prior to shooting so Tenney called up her agent about making a deal, and she flew back to arrive on set when filming began. When she met Allen, they both became very intimate with their relationship. Tenney saw that she brought an "appeal" that affected everyone at the time, which was something he initially did not see.

Photographer J.P. Luebsen was hired to play Carlos Malfeitor, the villain, when he met Tenney through a friend at an Independence Day party. Whenever he was on set, Kitaen mentioned to him about being completely distant so that she could build herself up to be terrified of him. Other cast members include Quinn, Kenny Rhodes, and Kathleen Wilhoite. Although Wilhoite was the first to audition for Sarah "Zarabeth" Crawford, she initially did not respond to Tenney about the part, but later accepted it when they re-met. Rhodes stated that Witchboard was the only film in his career where he did not recall auditioning. The costumer gave him a bandanna to "toughen up" his character Mike, which he kept as he was a Bruce Springsteen fan.

=== Filming ===
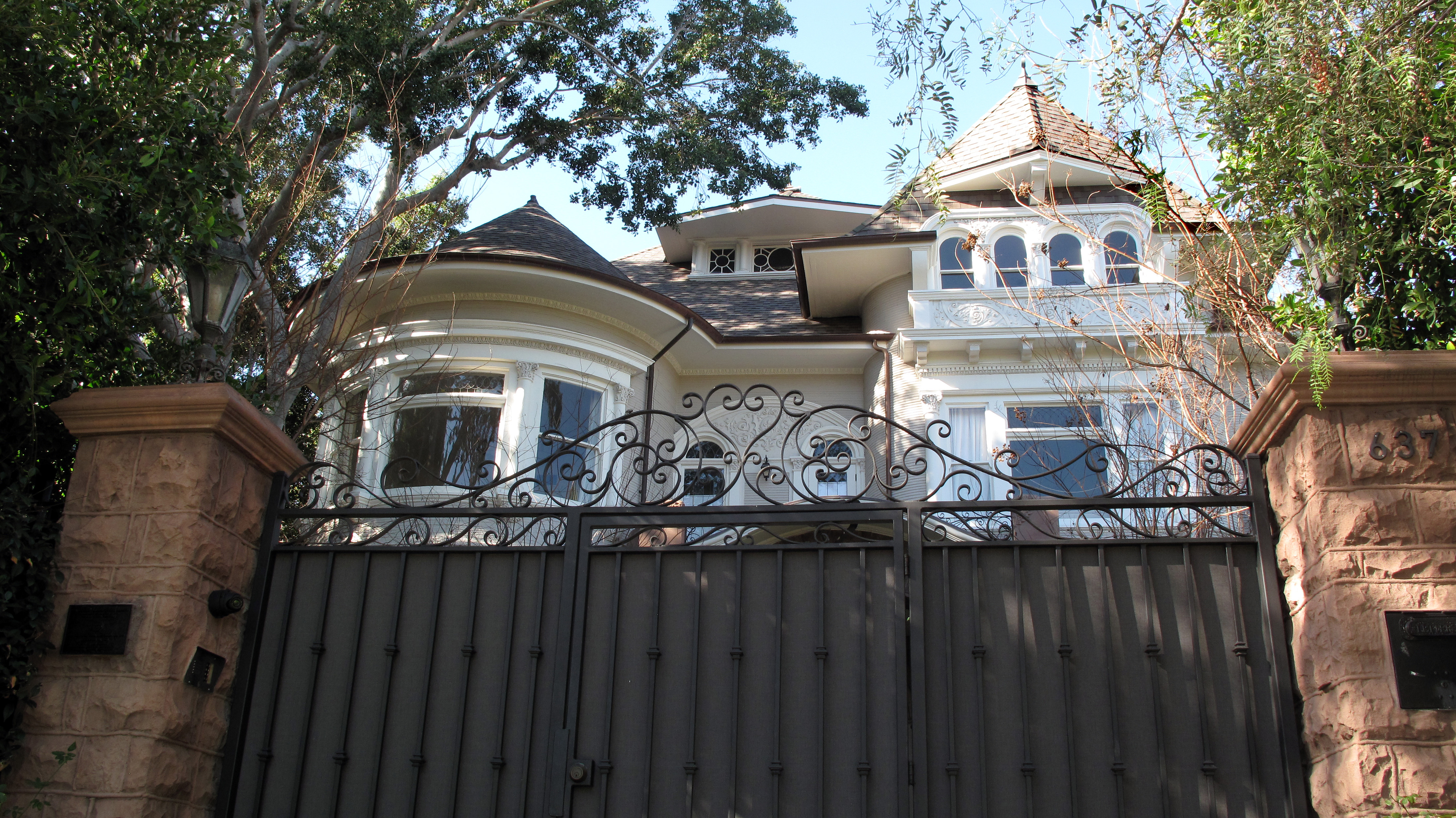
Filming took place partly at the historic Higgins-Verbeck-Hirsch Mansion in Los Angeles.

Though set in Tenney's hometown of Fairfield in Northern California, financial restraints mandated that the film be shot in Southern California. Principal photography took place in the summer of 1985, at the Higgins-Verbeck-Hirsch Mansion in Windsor Square, Los Angeles, and Big Bear Valley in San Bernardino, California. Additional photography occurred in San Francisco. Filming at Big Bear Lake occurred in August 1985, as well as at the Big Bear public library. Three days of filming were completed with an unnamed cinematographer, mainly the film's opening party scene. The producers subsequently chose to replace the cinematographer with Roy H. Wagner, who shot the remainder of the film.

The film was shot under the working title Ouija, but had to be re-titled during production after board game conglomerate Parker Brothers, who owned the trademark name "Ouija", attempted to prevent one of their boards from being used or mentioned in the film. The errors and omissions carrier did not approve of the filmmakers having already shot footage using one of their Ouija boards, requiring the production company to put up $50,000 bond to prevent any potential litigation. Though there was no lawsuit, Walter Josten stated that this should have been cleared before they started filming. The film's production company received the insurance to change the title to Witchboard and were allowed to pay the bond, as well as to integrate the board footage with an alternate board footage as shown when Jim and Brandon are at Big Bear. However, the filmmakers were divided about the title change, with many preferring Ouija while others felt that Witchboard was a "cooler" title.

Shooting the shower scene was difficult for Kitaen as she did not trust Tenney nor the camera crew to shoot the scene, but had faith in cinematographer Wagner to do it when she saw his wedding ring. According to Tenney, Kitaen only agreed to film nudity in the presence of married men. The crew used effects when the spirit turns on hot blazing water in the shower that Linda was trapped in, using breakaway glassed shower doors, and a fog machine to represent the hot water's moisture. Kitaen became more comfortable when the set was cleared to only the director and second-camera loader assistant, but this was a big uproar as all of the men had to temporarily leave the set.

On set, there were numerous running gags that Wagner was mostly involved in. In one, Kitaen devastatingly believed on-set that her poodle was accidentally run over by the props truck, but she was relieved to find that the dog was safe and it was only a gag prop with hair similar to her dog that was laid on the road. At the time, they used another gag whereas since Kitaen was dating O. J. Simpson at the time and he visited her on set occasionally, they would call the production office under a pseudonym to speak with her. Other gags involved rocking Kitaen's trailer back and forth, flipping the outhouses upside down with actors inside, and locking the crew in rooms where they could not get out to set on time.

There also, however, was a fair share of eerie occurrences on set. Some of the crew, mostly those that had come in earlier, had significant problems inside the 637 Lucerne Blvd house such as the crew bumping into objects that were not there, as well as objects that moved that no one else around could have moved during that time frame. Wagner especially felt a strong presence at the staircase where someone was walking behind him, and numerous occurrences where the cast and crew heard whispering and talking.

The last scene shot was of Jim being pushed out of the window, which was done in one take at a distant park, using a built replica of the window. Since there was a crane arm behind Allen, he could not flail his arms around and instead blocked it out with his shoulders.

=== Effects ===
The filmmakers hired Tassilo Baur to handle the special effects for Witchboard. The nightmare sequence of Linda being decapitated by Malfeitor was shot with a stand-in ducking their head, with a Styrofoam head connected to a poll placed on top with a wig that matched Kitaen's hairstyle. Luebsen was nervous about using a real axe since he was swinging it very close to the stand-in. Baur explained despite they used a real axe, they had also used prop axes for safety reasons as well as to improve their performances. Baur also had some props that were hinged so that they precisely hit a specific spot.

Allen was initially dismissive that the scene where Lloyd throws a carpenter's hatchet near Jim's head did not work well, but Tenney reassured him. The scene was originally planned to be shot with an FX man shooting the hatchet directly, but it was the film's cinematographer Roy H. Wagner that suggested they shoot it in reverse, thus also showing the scene to Allen to see how he can act it out in reverse if it was real. They also had the fake hatchet put into a piece of balsa wood, and they yanked it out with a wire.

The scene where Lloyd is killed from fallen sheetrock was cut repeatedly, mostly due to Quinn's comedic personality on-set repeatedly making Allen laugh. Since they used a dummy for the sheetrock to fall and when it fell, it caused the dummy's legs to slightly fling up, which made Quinn hysterically laugh. When the sheetrock fell down, it caused a very loud noise to which Allen's reaction on screen was real, as he felt it sounded almost equivalent to a gunshot. Baur, accompanied with special-effects assistant Mick Strawn, practiced dropping the sheetrock from a floor above with sheets of fake-sheetrock and two actual ones on both sides, and did this until they could drop it reliably to make it look convincing.

== Release ==
The film's production company, Paragon Arts International, held a special early screening of Witchboard exclusively for residents of Big Bear, California—where the film was partially shot—at the 20th Century Fox Studios lot in Culver City on February 26, 1986. Cinema Group gave the film a 15-screen limited theatrical release on December 31, 1986, in several mid-sized U.S. cities, including Anchorage, Alaska; Buffalo, New York; Columbus, Ohio; Coeur d'Alene, Idaho; El Paso, Texas; and Spokane, Washington. Due to the favorable box-office returns in these smaller markets, Cinema Group expanded the film's theatrical release to 1,100 screens nationwide on March 13, 1987.

The Samuel Goldwyn Company acquired the film for international distribution, and released it theatrically in England in May 1987.

=== Home media ===
Witchboard was released on VHS in the United States by Continental Video on June 17, 1987, and sold approximately 80,000 units that year. By the end of the year, it had charted at number 18 on the U.S. Billboard Top 40 Video Rentals, between Stand by Me and Something Wild. It was released on VHS in the United Kingdom through Guild Home Video in the fall of 1987.

Anchor Bay Entertainment released the film on DVD in August 2004, which is now out of print. On February 4, 2014, Scream Factory, a subsidiary of Shout! Factory, released the film on Blu-ray and DVD as a multi-format combination set.

== Reception ==
=== Box office ===
The film grossed $95,435 in the United States during its opening week of New Year's Eve 1986, and went on to earn a total of $416,336 over the following four weeks. The film grossed $2.7 million during its wide opening weekend in March 1987. Through its course, the film's final box office gross was $7,369,373.

=== Critical response ===
==== Contemporary ====
John H. Richardson of the Los Angeles Daily News criticized the film's performances and writing, noting, "There's very little tension and almost no slice-and-dice. The few gore effects are terrible ... The only thing that makes you want to forgive Witchboard is the clumsy earnestness of its execution." Caryn James of The New York Times criticized the film as "cheaply made," writing, "The very best I can say is that Witchboard should encourage struggling film makers. Watch it and think, I can do better than that!" Desmond Ryan of The Philadelphia Inquirer similarly panned the film, referring to it as "luridly fake" and "a timid "exorcise" in inanity." The San Bernardino Sun's William Wolf praised Kathleen Wilhoite's performance in the film, noting that she "injects some personality into the role, however trashy it is. That's more than you can say for the rest of the cast and the characters they play." David Inman of The Courier-Journal awarded the film one out of four stars, but conceded, "For folks who like their scares straight and their movies without much else, Witchboard provides exactly that." Henry Edgar of the Virginia Daily Press also panned the film as being unintentionally humorous, commenting that it "is so awful it unintentionally qualifies as a comedy by taking itself so seriously you can't help laughing." The Montreal Gazette's Bruce Bailey awarded the film one-and-a-half stars and criticized it for its lack of originality, noting that it "boldly goes where everybody else has gone before."

Writing for the Great Falls Tribune, Eleanor Ringel noted that the film begins as a "fairly efficient horror movie ... but after a careful, unnecessarily complicated buildup, the film falls apart." The Miami News's Deborah Wilker echoed a similar sentiment, noting that, "midway through this nonsense, you give up hoping that Witchboard will emerge as one of those so-bad-it's-good horror flicks. At first the potential seems to be there, but as it unfolds, Witchboard becomes just plain dopey." Malcolm Johnson of the Hartford Courant similarly criticized the film, writing that it "plumbs new depths of tedium and incompetence ... unfortunately, none of this is quite flamboyant enough to rise to the heights of camp."

Alternately, Candice Russell of the Sun-Sentinel favorably compared the film to Poltergeist (1982) and Rosemary's Baby (1968), praising it as an "intense, atmospheric chiller [that] breeds suspicion of things unseen and misunderstood... The payoff for the mayhem isn't much, but the events leading up to it more than suffice. Witchboard scares, as intended." Rick Bentley of The Town Talk also gave the film a favorable review, referring to it as "a cut above average" and "not afraid to make fun of itself." Michael Wilmington's review of the film for the Los Angeles Times noted that it "is smarter, and better acted, than much of its bloody competition," but "not crazy or original enough to stand too far above them." Ted Mahar of The Oregonian similarly praised the film for its restraint in depicting gore, adding that its characters' "relationships and backgrounds are important, and a certain intelligence and wit pops up now and then."

Reviewing the film following its British theatrical release, Tim Fernandez of The Southport Observer described it as "fairly routine stuff by horror standards, but certainly capable of conjuring up a shock or two if you've got a sufficiently vivid imagination."

==== Retrospective ====
In the years since its release, Witchboard developed a cult following. On the review aggregator website Rotten Tomatoes, 50% of 18 critics' reviews are positive. Metacritic, which uses a weighted average, assigned the film a score of 45 out of 100, based on 5 critics, indicating "mixed or average" reviews.

TV Guide awarded the film three out of five stars, describing it as "an ambitious horror film [that] rejects graphic violence and instead spins a spooky tale of the supernatural... First-time feature director-writer Kevin S. Tenney imbues his picture with a surprisingly slick sense of style and employs some clever camerawork when the narrative warrants it, refusing to bore the viewer with the endless evil-point-of-view shots favored by so many other horror directors."

JoBlo.com writer Cody Hamman praised the film's screenplay in a 2022 retrospective on the film, writing: "The script Tenney wrote is so good, it’s shocking that it was his first one," and commended the film's "unsettling atmosphere throughout, a feeling of building dread."

== Themes ==
Witchboard was subject to significant critical analysis in Carol J. Clover's horror film studies book Men, Women, and Chain Saws (1992), in which she argued for the film's complex treatment of gender politics. Clover also noted themes of homosocial affection exemplified in the friendship between the two lead male characters, Jim and Brandon, with Linda, their mutual love interest, "at once a barrier and a conduit" between them. "But if the devil tells a literal lie, he tells a figurative truth. Jim may not be the designated "portal," but he has been, in the film's own language, opened—to the supernatural and to the past and present truths of his own feelings."

== Sequels and remake ==
The film spawned two sequels, Witchboard 2: The Devil's Doorway (1993) and Witchboard III: The Possession (1995). In 2024, a remake of the same name was released.

== See also ==
- List of ghost films

== Sources ==
- Campisi, Gabriel (2012). The Independent Filmmaker's Guide to Writing a Business Plan for Investors (2nd ed.). Jefferson, North Carolina: McFarland & Company. ISBN 978-0-786-49021-9.
- Clover, Carol J. (1992). Men, Women, and Chainsaws. Princeton, New Jersey: Princeton University Press. ISBN 978-0-691-00620-8.
- Paszylk, Bartłomiej (2009). The Pleasure and Pain of Cult Horror Films. Jefferson, North Carolina: McFarland. ISBN 978-0-786-45327-6.
- Wagner, Roy H.; Byrne, Wayne (2025). Roy H. Wagner: A Cinematographer's Life Beyond the Shadows. Jefferson, North Carolina: McFarland & Company. ISBN 978-1-476-69379-8.
