= Louis Debaraz =

French Roman Catholic priest

Louis Debaraz (died 1745), was a French Roman Catholic priest. He was executed in Lyon on the charges of witchcraft after having performed sacrilegious masses and a pact with the Devil in order to find hidden treasures.

He was implicated in the Lyon witch trials of Bertrand Guilladot, who in his confession identified twenty-nine other individuals, all of them male, who reportedly had participated in the pact with him.

In February 1745, five of the accused men were sentenced to death for witchcraft in connection to treasure hunting. Three of the condemned were priests, who were accused of having performed sacrilegious masses for this purpose. Debaraz, was sentenced to be executed by burning for having performed a black mass. Twenty-three of the remaining accused were sentenced to be galley slaves.
