= Trial of the Wizards of Lyon =

1742–1745 witch trials in France

The Procès des sorciers de Lyon ('The trial of the Wizards of Lyon') was a witch trial which took place in Lyon in France between 1742 and 1745. It was the last big witch trial in France and likely the last to result in death sentences. 14 people, mainly men, were charged with having made a pact with Satan and of using witchcraft to find hidden treasures. The trial resulted in three death sentences and three men being condemned to the galleys.

== History ==
On 21 July 1742, two male travellers from Maréchaussée and a man by the name Benoit Michalet were arrested in Caluire. Benoit Michalet was arrested in possession of grimoires, and clerical objects such as candles from the church. He was interrogated on 23 July and confessed to be a member of a secret society to which he was introduced by Claude François Charbonnier. The goal of the society was to use the figures of Solomon and the Theurgy and call upon the angel Uriel in order to find hidden treasures. Witch trials were no longer common in France, but witchcraft was still forbidden as a religious crime, and the men were charged with witchcraft.

On 14 February 1743 Benoit Michalet was subjected to torture. He was transferred to Dijon as the process progressed. Bertrand Guilladot identified twenty-nine other individuals, all of them male, who reportedly had participated in a Satan's pact with him.

14 people were put on trial for witchcraft, five of them in absentia. Guillaume Janin and Jean Ferroussat were hanged on place du Morimont, after which their bodies were publicly burned. The priest Louis Debaraz was the only one to be burned alive at the stake. Carat and Lambert were executed in absentia. Michalet, Tissot and Charbonnier were condemned to be galley slaves. The women involved, Isabeau Gay, Jeanne Chanat and Jeanne Chabert, were banished from France. Romi(y)eux were sentenced to do public penance. These were the last witchcraft sentences in France.
