= T-RAN =

American singer (born 1984)

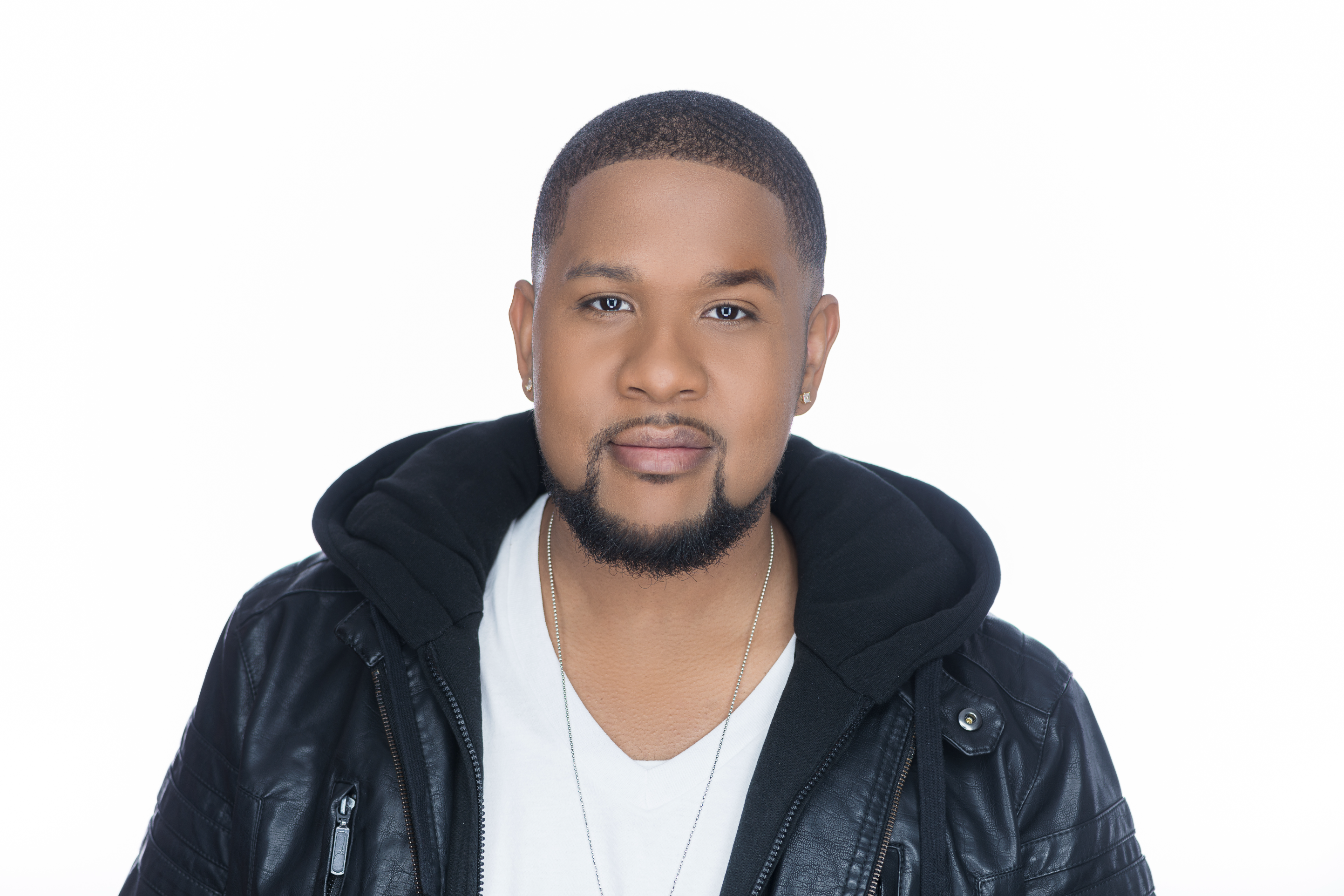

Background information
- Also known as: T-RAN
- Born: Terran Jerrell Gilbert; December 7, 1984 (age 41); Chattanooga, Tennessee, US
- Genres: Alternative R&B, pop, Christian hip hop, contemporary gospel
- Occupations: Musician, singer, songwriter, recording artist, actor, music video director, entrepreneur, producer
- Instruments: Piano, vocals, keyboard
- Years active: 1999–present
- Label: 22Visionz
- Website: t-ran22v.com

Terran Jerrell Gilbert (born December 7, 1984), known by his stage name T-RAN, is an American singer, songwriter, record producer, musician, music video director, actor, motivational speaker, entrepreneur, and philanthropist. He has shared the stage with such artists as Kirk Franklin, Lyfe Jennings, Shania Twain, Monica, and Kool & the Gang and was featured on TBN with rapper/host T-Bone as his song charted in the TX10 Countdown. As an actor, he has appeared in the films Straight into Darkness and Unconditional, as well as in episodes of Nashville. In 2023, he won Music Video of the Year at the Josie Music Awards, for directing Taylor Sanders' Firecracker. He is the founder of the entertainment company 22Visionz, LLC. His debut album, Live and Not Die, has received airplay worldwide on television, radio and internet.

In 2025, he received a proclamation in his honor from State Representative Yusuf Hakeem at the Tennessee State Capitol, for his impact on the music industry. In 2026, T-RAN received a state resolution recognizing him as an Ambassador of the Music and Entertainment Industry for the State of Tennessee by Tennessee State Representative Greg Vital.

== Early life ==
Terran Jerrell Gilbert was born on December 7, 1984, in Chattanooga, Tennessee. His father, Russell Gilbert Sr., is an elected official and hospital director. His mother, Terri Gilbert, works with children at the 22V Kids Academy, and with disadvantaged youth. T-RAN has three sisters: Skieree and twins Gabrielle and Whitney; and one brother, Russell Jr. He had an older sister, Sherree, who died at birth.

He began singing and dancing at the age of three, mimicking his musical idol, Michael Jackson. T-RAN picked up his first microphone at the age of four. His grandfather was a Baptist preacher and his grandmother was a church pianist. He credits his grandfather as the first to call him "T-RAN," as a way of helping people pronounce his first name.

T-RAN was exposed to secular and gospel music by age 9. He joined the youth choir at a local church at age 12, and became music director by age 13. That same year, he showcased his talent at a regional Gospel Star Search. It was during this time that he decided to sing professionally. By age 14, he appeared for the first time on television, on The Babbie Mason Show.

When he was 15, T-RAN wrote his first song, "Miracles." It was written as a testimony to God for delivering his older brother, Russell Jr., from a life-threatening illness.

T-RAN attended the Chattanooga High School Center for Creative Arts from 1999 to 2002, and studied under Alan Ledford in a theatrical music troupe called the Choo Choo Kids. Under Ledford's direction, T-RAN honed his performance skills and stage presence. In 2001, he toured with the troupe in Europe.

== College years ==
T-RAN earned a Bachelor of Science degree in Telecommunications from Lee University, a Christian liberal arts college in Cleveland, Tennessee, which he attended from 2003 to 2007. He toured in Jamaica and The Bahamas in 2006.

In 2008, T-RAN licensed his company, 22Visionz, LLC. Its name is derived from Proverbs 22:1 of the Bible: “A good name is rather to be chosen than great riches, and loving favor rather than silver and gold.”

In 2008, his father ran for a seat on the Chattanooga City Council in a special election and won. T-RAN worked as campaign manager for his father's campaign in 2008, and his re-election campaigns in 2009 and 2013.

== Career ==
T-RAN's earliest large venue performance took place at the SEC women's basketball tournament in 1999 at the University of Tennessee at Chattanooga arena, where he sang the national anthem. He also sang background for Shania Twain at the same venue in 2000 for her performance of the song "God Bless the Child." Twain sent him a letter thanking him for backing her.

In 2009, he headlined one of the largest stages during prime time at the annual Riverbend Festival in Chattanooga. He has also performed at the annual J-Fest Christian music festival.

T-RAN has shared stages with many national and international artists, including Monica, Chrisette Michele, Kirk Franklin, Chris Tomlin, Toby Mac, Steven Curtis Chapman, Casting Crowns, Natalie Grant, Bishop Paul Morton Sr., Da T.R.U.T.H., Anthony Hamilton, Coco Jones, Freddy Jackson, Bobby Rush, Pettidee, Lyfe Jennings, Gorilla Zoe and Kool & The Gang.

He toured in 2013 with gospel artist Canton Jones on the KB4 Tour. He hosted and headlined the "Culture Shock" concert in Chattanooga in 2010 and 2011.

T-RAN released his Live and Not Die EP in 2013 on the strength of the first single, "Need You Now," written and produced by T-RAN, and co-produced by James Matchack. The video for the song, released on January 25, 2012, had over 1.4 million views on YouTube. In 2015, the song was featured in the TV One movie For the Love of Ruth. That year, T-RAN headlined the Live and Not Die Tour.

T-RAN recorded the hip hop song "Turn The Lights On" with Teron Carter of the Grammy Award-nominated group G.R.I.T.S. In 2012, T-RAN was the featured artist on the song "I Believe," by The Voice contestant Sera Hill. He went on a media tour with Hill in Tennessee and Georgia to promote of the song.

In 2012, he went on a media tour in California that included performances at the 6th Annual Million Mothers March in Pomona, California. In 2013, he played at the legendary WitZend club in Los Angeles.

In 2014, T-RAN headlined the Live and Not Die concert at one of Nashville's largest music venues, 12th & Porter, with Disney sensation Coco Jones.

In 2015, T-RAN performed for gospel legend Babbie Mason on the Babbie's House show. He was also a guest lecturer at Babbie Mason's Inner Circle master class for singers and songwriters.

In 2021, he directed and produced Da' T.R.U.T.H.'s music video, "Lemonaid". T-RAN's co-write, Other Side, recorded by Taylor Sandors, was featured in a People magazine Exclusive in 2024. He is also credited as the producer on the single as well as producing and directing the music video.

== The Imprint ==
T-RAN has released three singles ("Breathe," "Nowhere," and "Lord Make Me Over") from his unreleased full-length album, The Imprint. The video for "Breathe" was released on September 18, 2015, and tells the story of a man trying to save his marriage. The video for "Nowhere," released on January 8, 2016, tells the story of a woman who has escaped from the perils of human trafficking. T-RAN worked with Nashville producer OGTha3 on the co-production of "Breathe," and "Nowhere."

== Endorsement ==
In 2015, T-RAN was endorsed by the company Alclair, which manufactures custom in-ear monitors.

== Philanthropy ==
In 2012, T-RAN took his music and motivational speaking on the "Season of Non-Violence Tour," with Dr. Arun Gandhi, grandson of Mahatma Gandhi. He also performed a benefit concert in 2012 with gospel artist Gordon Mote.

In 2014, T-RAN headlined a celebrity benefit concert in Los Angeles for Homeboys Industries, benefiting programs for gang-involved and previously incarcerated men and women. He also partnered with international agency Feed the Children.

In 2014, T-RAN sponsored a benefit concert for the Nashville-based nonprofit Nashville Peacemakers, an organization fighting against human trafficking, youth violence and illiteracy. He also performed at the IndieCares Concert Series sponsored by Nashville Inner City Ministries, benefiting needy families.

In 2016, T-RAN teamed up with Unchained Movement and Nashville Peacemakers in promoting human trafficking awareness with the use of his video "Nowhere."

== International music and touring ==
In 2010, T-RAN toured in Mongolia and China with music from his Live and Not Die tour. Music from his EP played on Beijing radio.

In 2010, T-RAN began working with Polish rapper and music producer DJ Yonas, who enlisted T-RAN for his work with Polish rap group Rymcerze. T-RAN sang on Rymcerze's Z3RO Strachu album, on the track "Pokuta." He appeared on DJ Yonas's 2011 mixtape, Hard 4 Christ. He also sang on DJ Yonas's 2014 single, "Zimny Świat" (Cold World), which also featured rapper Bęsiu.

== Awards and honors ==
In 2011, T-RAN was honored with a proclamation for professional achievement from the State of Tennessee's House of Legislatures and the Key to the City by the City of Chattanooga. T-Ran was interviewed at TBN by rapper/host T-Bone for the TX10 Countdown, that aired on JCTV in 2012. In 2021, T-RAN was honored by the Chattanooga city council for being a Heroic and Selfless individual in the community. In 2025, he received a proclamation in his honor from State Representative Yusuf Hakeem at the Tennessee State Capitol, for his impact on the music industry. In 2026, T-RAN received a state resolution recognizing him as an Ambassador of the Music and Entertainment Industry for the State of Tennessee by Tennessee State Representative Greg Vital. He is the first African American artist to receive the honor.

== Discography ==
=== EPs ===
List of albums, with selected chart positions
Title	Album details	Peak chart positions		
Title	Album details	US	US R&B/HH	US R&B
Live and Not Die	Released: March 1, 2013; Label: 22Visionz Records; Formats: digital download	–	—	—
"—" denotes a title that did not chart, or was not released in that territory.

=== Albums ===
The Imprint (2016)

=== Singles ===
List of singles as lead artist, with chart positions, showing year released and project name
Title	Year	Peak chart positions			Album
Title	Year	US	US R&B/HH	US R&B	Album
"Need You Now"	2011	–	–	–	Live and Not Die (EP)
"Lord Make Me Over"	2014	–	—	—	The Imprint
"Breathe"	2015	–	—	—	The Imprint
"Nowhere"	2016	–	—	—	The Imprint
"—" denotes a title that did not chart, or was not released in that territory.

== Filmography ==
=== Film ===
Year	Title	Role	Notes
2004	Straight into Darkness	Soldier	
2012	Unconditional	Prisoner	

=== Television ===
Year	Title	Role	Notes
2012	TX10 Countdown	Self	JBCTV/TBN
2013	Nashville	NASCAR Fan	ABC television series
2013	Nashville	Band Member	ABC television series
2015	Babbie's House	Self	WATC-TV

=== Music videos ===
Year	Title	Role	Director
2012	"Need You Now"	Self	Mike Kelly and T-Ran Gilbert
2015	"Breathe"	Self	Karsten Winegeart and T-Ran Gilbert
2016	"Nowhere"	Self	Chastity Stafford

== Personal life ==
T-RAN resides in Nashville, Tennessee with his wife Alexis and their two daughters.
