= Jack Frost 2: Revenge of the Mutant Killer Snowman =

2000 American film by Michael Cooney

Jack Frost 2: The Revenge of the Mutant Killer Snowman
- DVD cover
- Directed by: Michael Cooney
- Written by: Michael Cooney
- Produced by: Jeremy Paige; Vicki Slotnick
- Starring: Christopher Allport; Eileen Seeley; Chip Heller; Marsha Clark; David Allen Brooks; Scott MacDonald
- Cinematography: Dean Lent
- Edited by: Shawn Paper
- Music by: Chris Anderson; Carl Schurtz
- Production companies: Cypress Willow Productions; Storyteller Films Ltd.
- Distributed by: A-Pix Entertainment, Inc.
- Release date: 2000
- Running time: 91 minutes
- Country: United States
- Language: English

Jack Frost 2: The Revenge of the Mutant Killer Snowman (also known as simply Jack Frost 2) is a 2000 American direct-to-video comedy slasher film written and directed by Michael Cooney. It is a sequel to Jack Frost (1997). It was completed in 1998, but not released until 2000.

Like its predecessor, Jack Frost 2 has garnered a cult following. In December 21–28, 2021, MVD Rewind released the film on Blu-ray and DVD.

== Plot ==
Sam Tiler has been struggling to recover from his encounter with Jack Frost last Christmas. To get away from the stress, Sam's wife, Anne, suggests a tropical vacation to The Bahamas to attend the wedding of his deputy, Joe, and his fiancé, Marla. Sam reluctantly agrees.

Meanwhile, the FBI uses antifreeze to dissolve Jack and test the remains for genetic material. An accident causes Jack to wake up, causing him to reform and break free. Jack, now sharing a psychic link with Sam, because of Sam's blood mixing with Jack in the antifreeze, follows Sam.

The vacationers arrive to a greeting by the eccentric Colonel Hickering and his assistants Captain Fun and Bobby. Jack washes ashore and kills three women: Ashlea, Paisley and Rose. The next morning, the Colonel discovers Paisley's body and tries to cover up the whole mess, as he does not want this to ruin his resort. However, the island's security head, Agent Manners who had survived Jack's maiming of him, suspects that Jack has returned.

Jack continues his rampage, killing a beach model and her cameraman. Sam begins to suspect that something is amiss when he runs into Manners, who agrees to an alliance in order to stop Jack Frost. Sam, Captain Fun (who is actually Manners' undercover assistant), and Manners stage a trap to capture Jack. This fails as the snowman they capture was really the Colonel in costume.

After slaying another beach model, Jack decides to freeze the place, causing it to snow. The party guests begin to play around and have a snowball fight when Jack enters the fray, killing at least another dozen. Sam, Anne, Marla, Manners, and Joe lock themselves up in a room, using antifreeze to keep Jack at bay.

Sam and Manners decide to find help, and end up finding a room where the Colonel, Captain Fun, and Bobby have barricaded themselves. They find more antifreeze and lure Jack into a pool of coolant. However, Jack has become much more resilient to the antifreeze due to his time in the lab. Jack spits out a snowball and flees, followed by Manners, into the woods.

Sam, Anne, and the others observe the snowball and it "hatches" and becomes a baby snowman, who kills Captain Fun. Meanwhile, Manners has followed Jack to a shed, where he finds dozens of snowball children which devour him.

The survivors attempt to trap as many of the snowmen as they can until the supply ships arrive. Eventually, Anne realizes that they can be killed by bananas, due to Sam being allergic to bananas. As a result, Jack would share the same vulnerabilities.

Jack watches a baby snowman die and becomes angry. He kills Bobby and the Colonel. Marla and Joe flee and lock themselves in the freezer with Captain Fun's body, while Anne is attacked by Jack. Sam shoots Jack with a banana attached to an arrow, causing him to explode. Anne and Sam embrace each other and leave the island.

During the credits, the two sailors on the supply boat are crushed by a giant carrot, implying that Jack is still alive. In post credits, Joe and Marla were accidentally left in the freezer.

== Cast ==
- Christopher Allport as Sheriff Sam Tiler
- Scott MacDonald as Jack Frost (voice)
- Matt Falletta as Jack Frost (suit performer, credited as Matthew Falletta)
- Eileen Seeley as Anne Tiler
- Chip Heller as Deputy Joe Foster
- Marsha Clark as Marla Foster
- Ray Cooney as Colonel Hickering
- David Allen Brooks as FBI Agent Manners
- Sean Patrick Murphy as Captain Fun
- Tai Bennet as Bobby
- Jennifer Lyons as Rose
- Shonda Farr as Ashlea
- Granger Green as Paisley
- Ian Abercrombie as Dr. Morton (credited as Ian Ambercrombie)
- Melanie Good as Sarah
- Paul Hansen Kim Jr. as Greg (credited as Paul H. Kim)
- Stephanie Chao as Cindy (credited as Stephanie Shon Chao)
- Doug Jones as Dave
- Stefan C. Marchand as Charlie
- Brian Gross as Dean
- Jason Hall as Ben
- Tony Masa as Boat Captain
- Richard Wong as First Mate
- Dani Lynn Cooney as Secretary
- Theresa Pink as Scared Girl
- Kerri V. Griffin as Frozen Girl
- Brett Boydstun as Idiot (credited as Brett A. Boydstun)
- Kurt Bryant as Angry Man
- Vanessa Marshall as Bloody Girl
- Jack Dougherty as One Armed Man

== Production ==
=== Filming ===
The film was shot by Michael Cooney in a digital widescreen format (which the crew struggled with) in four weeks on an island in Southern California. During production, the crew had "money people leaning on [them]" and did not have the same creative freedom that they had when making the first film, and experienced near-constant rain, which hindered their work. The film was sponsored by Asahi Breweries, with their products used as set decorations.

=== Special effects ===
Most of the film's special effects were created by Marsy Blasgen, Bill Cochran, John C. Hartigan and Richard Kratt in computer-generated imagery, rather than being done practically. Cooney felt that the snowman was "almost too improved", as there were scenes where the snowman suit was seen walking and moving his mouth when speaking. He stated, "I think it gives the game away. In the first one we couldn't do that so there were lots of close ups and over the shoulder and such, and I think that's part of what gave that film its personality."

=== Casting ===
Christopher Allport, Scott MacDonald, Eileen Seeley, Chip Heller and Marsha Clark returned to reprise their roles, with the exception of Stephen Mendel, who was replaced by David Allen Brooks in the role of FBI Agent Manners. Cooney's father Ray Cooney played the role of Colonel Hickering.

== Reception ==
As with the first film, Jack Frost 2: The Revenge of the Mutant Killer Snowman was panned by critics. On Rotten Tomatoes, the film has an approval rating of 0% based on 6 critic reviews, with an average rating of 3.3/10.

=== Accolades ===
Year	Award	Category	Result
2001	2nd Golden Trailer Awards	Trashiest Trailer	Nominated

== Proposed sequel ==
In December 2016, writer and director Michael Cooney revealed there were plans for a third film in the series, which would have featured a giant Jack Frost known as "Jackzilla". The film would have picked up a decade following the ending of the second film, with a giant Jack Frost letting loose on a city causing destruction and mayhem. Cooney expressed interest in making the third installment, due to the advancement in special effects, and would be happy if someone would be willing to help him make it as it holds a special place in his heart.
