= Jack Frost (1997 film) =

1997 American film by Michael Cooney

- North American DVD cover
- Directed by: Michael Cooney
- Written by: Michael Cooney; Jeremy Paige
- Produced by: Jeremy Paige; Vicki Slotnick
- Starring: Christopher Allport; Stephen Mendel; F. William Parker; Rob LaBelle; Shannon Elizabeth; Jack Lindine; Zack Egniton; Brian Leckner; Marsha Clark; Eileen Seeley; Kelly Jean Peters; Scott MacDonald
- Cinematography: Dean Lent
- Edited by: Terry Kelley
- Music by: Chris Anderson; Carl Schurtz
- Distributed by: A-Pix Entertainment, Inc.
- Release date: November 18, 1997
- Running time: 89 minutes
- Country: United States
- Language: English
- Budget: $500,000

Jack Frost is a 1997 American direct-to-video black comedy slasher film written and directed by Michael Cooney. It stars Scott MacDonald and Christopher Allport.

Despite being critically panned, the film has developed a cult following and was followed by a sequel in 2000, Jack Frost 2: Revenge of the Mutant Killer Snowman. Jack Frost marked the film debut of Shannon Elizabeth.

== Plot ==
On a snowy December night, a state execution transfer vehicle crosses into the quiet backwater town of Snowmonton. Inside is serial killer Jack Frost, who eluded police for years and left a trail of thirty-eight bodies across eleven states before finally being arrested by Sam Tiler, the sheriff of Snowmonton. Jack is scheduled to be executed at midnight, but he kills the guard and the vehicle crashes into a genetic research truck. Jack is exposed to chemicals from inside the truck, causing him to dissolve and fuse with the snow.

Despite news reports of Jack's demise, Sam cannot forget Jack's threats of vengeance. Old Man Harper is found murdered, and soon afterward a local bully named Billy is killed when he is pushed into the way of an oncoming sled, getting decapitated. According to Sam's son, Ryan, a snowman caused Billy's death. Billy's father, Jake, is murdered when the same snowman stuffs an axe into his throat. Billy's mother, Sally, is later killed when the snowman strangles her with Christmas lights, shoves her face into a box of glass ornaments, and slams a light-up snowflake into the top of her head.

FBI Agents Manners and Stone arrive in Snowmonton and convince the Sheriff to put the town on 24-hour curfew, sending his officers out to gather all the townspeople. Deputy Chris Pullman is killed when the snowman runs the officer over with a police cruiser. Billy's older sister Jill and her boyfriend Tommy sneak into the sheriff's home to steal his wine and have sex, as revenge for her brother's death. The snowman kills Tommy with icicles and pretends to be bath water to lure in Jill. Jack then re-solidifies with Jill in the tub, trapping her arms in his shoulders, and rapes her with a carrot on his crotch while repeatedly slamming her head against the wall.

The snowman returns with the police cruiser to the station, finally confronting Sam. Agent Stone reveals himself to be a representative of the genetic research company that created the chemicals and reveals that the snowman is a mutated Jack Frost. He also reveals that the human soul exists as a chemical and that the acid was going to be used to contain DNA in case of a nuclear holocaust. They attempt to destroy Jack by blowing him up by releasing aerosol cans in the police station and firing a bullet at him, but to no avail. They then use blowdryers to drive Jack into a furnace, which evaporates the snowman. Jack condenses, killing Stone and wounding Manners. Jack traps Sam and Ryan in his car, but Sam escapes by inadvertently throwing the oatmeal Ryan made him at Jack, burning the snowman's head. Ryan put antifreeze in the oatmeal, believing it could help keep his father from getting cold.

Sam tells his friend, Paul Davrow, to fill the bed of his truck with antifreeze. Jack chases Sam through the halls of a church and finally catches him, driving an icicle into his chest and almost killing him. The truck full of antifreeze arrives just in time, however, and Jack and Sam crash through a window and into the truck's bed. Jack melts in the antifreeze, and the antifreeze is poured back into the containers and buried deep under the ground of Snowmonton. Sam's wife, Anne, realizes that the state police are on their way. When Paul asks Sam what they are going to tell them, Sam says, "We'll tell them that it's too late". However, one of the containers is shown to be bubbling, revealing Jack is still alive.

== Cast ==
- Scott MacDonald as Jack Frost
- Christopher Allport as Sheriff Sam Tiler
- Stephen Mendel as FBI Agent Manners
- F. William Parker as Paul Davrow
- Eileen Seeley as Anne Tiler
- Rob LaBelle as FBI Agent Stone
- Zack Eginton as Ryan Tiler
- Shannon Elizabeth as Jill Metzner
- Jack Lindine as Jake Metzner
- Kelly Jean Peters as Sally Metzner
- Marsha Clark as Marla and Little Girl (voice, uncredited)
- Chip Heller as Deputy Joe Foster
- Brian Leckner as Deputy Chris Pullman
- Darren O. Campbell as Tommy Davrow
- Paul Keith as Doc Peters
- Charles C. Stevenson Jr. as Father Branagh
- Nathan Hague as Billy Metzner
- Todd Conner as Driver
- Richard Whiten as Second Driver
- Harley Zumbrum as Guard
- Kurt Bryant as Tanker Driver
- Brett Boydstun as Idiot
- Michael Cooney as Narrator (voice, uncredited)

== Production ==
=== Development ===
Writer Michael Cooney first got the idea for Jack Frost's story in 1989. Cooney, along with co-writer Jeremy Paige and producer Vicki Slotnick, stayed in a cabin one time up in Big Bear Lake. They built a snowman in the backyard, which Slotnick found creepy at night as it was outside her window, leaving her unable to sleep. Shortly after Cooney and Paige started talking about making a film about a killer snowman. Terminator 2: Judgment Day had released at the time and had digital special effects, so Cooney thought about a killer that was made of all the elements of water, including snow, ice and steam. The original script, inspired by The Abyss (with its Industrial Light & Magic-animated water creature) and Shocker (with its concept of an executed serial killer seeking vengeance by transformation), began with the action taking place in a small town and then in a skyscraper in Denver. When Cooney first wrote the script, he and Paige were thinking that Jack Frost would be a big budget film with all the effects. The film was planned to have a $25-30 million budget and be directed by Renny Harlin, but was rejected by Harlin's then-wife Geena Davis.

In 1992, Prism Entertainment asked Paige and Slotnick if they could do the film for under a million dollars. Since they could not afford a director, Slotnick suggested that Cooney direct the film. Their script was full of special effects that were unable to be achieved on the film's extremely low budget, for which they had to improve the script. During pre-production, they still thought that they could make "quite a nasty horror movie". They then saw the snowman, which led to the script being rewritten.

=== Casting ===
Cooney, Paige and Slotnick (along with Lisa Bankert) cast Christopher Allport in the lead role as Sam Tiler. Other actors and actresses cast for the film included Shannon Elizabeth in her screen debut as Jill Metzner, Stephen Mendel as Agent Manners, F. William Parker as Paul Davrow, Eileen Seeley as Anne Tiler, Darren O. Campbell as Tommy Davrow, and Scott MacDonald as Jack Frost. MacDonald was allowed to come up with various one-liners when doing Jack's voice in post-production. Cooney himself provided the voice of the man who tells the story of Jack Frost over the opening credits, while actress Marsha Clark did the voice of the little girl. Stunt coordinator Kurt Bryant played the tanker driver at the beginning of the film.

=== Filming ===
Prism was set to finance the film, but went bankrupt three weeks before principal photography began, leaving its banker, Lou Horowitz, to oversee the film. The film was shot on short ends (100-300-foot leftovers of 1,000-foot rolls that major film producers discard) in January 1994 over a course of 18 days. Portions of the film were filmed at the Fawn Lodge in Fawnskin, California, on the north west shore of Big Bear Lake. According to Scott MacDonald, the film was shot during a severe winter drought, in which there was barely any snow on the ground, and temperatures often reached as high as 70 °F (21.11 °C). This resulted in the crew having to use foam and cotton as snow substitutes. Further addressing the low budget of the film, Cooney referenced Campbell Soup's "Let it Snow" advertisement and noted that the commercial (which similarly features a living snowman character) had a budget "three times" that of the film. Furthermore, he stated that Identity, another film that he wrote, had a budget of $30 million, while Jack Frost was made for "the cost of its catering budget".

The bathtub scene was intended to have Jack Frost smashing Jill into the wall until she died. It was filmed on a soundstage in one day toward the end of shooting, with the bathtub built on a raised set. For the shot where Jack rises out of the tub, a stunt performer (in the snowman costume) and Shannon Elizabeth were strapped together on a scissor lift that raised them up 12 feet in the air through the fake tub. While shooting the part where Jack hits Jill's head against the wall, the snowman's carrot nose hit Elizabeth in her eye. Medics were called in, flushing her eye with saline and the carrot was removed for that scene. During the editing phase, Terry Kelley and others told Cooney, "You know what this looks like, don't you?" Despite it not being written as a sex or rape scene, Cooney decided to engineer the scene backwards and so added a few shots of Jack making sex puns after Jill's death for continuity.

When Horowitz saw the final cut, he deemed it unsellable and shelved the film. In 1997, A-Pix Entertainment bought the rights to distribute the film.

=== Special effects ===
Cooney, Paige and Slotnick spent $50,000 at a company that was supposed to make multiple versions of Jack Frost, but they only made one immobile 8-foot-tall snowman, which the crew had to embrace. It was made from three balls of foam. The snowman was created by Screaming Mad George's team of artists, supervised by Michael Deak and designed by Kenneth J. Hall at Total Fabrication, with assistance from makeup artist Melanie Tooker and puppeteer John Fedel.

The crew used different props for the Jack Frost suit during production. They included one head with a big, open mouth with fangs, one body, and two-three other heads. The scene where the police station is blown up ends with a close-up of the snowman bursting into flames. To make sure that they would never need the "grubby" snowman again, the crew doused it in gasoline and burned it. Other props used for the snowman included two bodies (one with the arms by his side and another where the arms could move) and a couple of spare arms used for close-ups. The snowman costume's movements were very limited. The only time that Jack is actually seen moving is in a scene where he explodes and puts himself back together, shot in time lapse. The first scene shot with Fedel in the snowman costume was one where Tommy is stabbed with icicles in the kitchen. The crew had to shoot the scene with longer lenses and compress it due to the scene being difficult to frame.

== Reception ==
The film was panned by critics for its poor acting and dialogue, low budget special effects, comical death sequences, principal photography, and plot. On Rotten Tomatoes, the film holds an approval rating of 16% based on 19 reviews, with a weighted average rating of 3/10. Grave Reviews gave the film 2.5 out of 5 Graves. Author Steven Hutchison gave the film 4 out of 8, stating that the film's low budget "doesn't allow a production as cohesive and enjoyable as the Child's Play movies", and compared its plot to that of the films, with the difference that it "only wants to cash-in on the holiday spirit and a winning formula". Hutchison also criticized the principal photography, dialogue, special effects and acting.

== Sequel ==
A sequel, Jack Frost 2: Revenge of the Mutant Killer Snowman, was released in 2000. A third installment was planned with the tentative title of Jack Frost 3: Jackzilla, but hopes of the sequel being made are unlikely because of the death of Christopher Allport in 2008.

== Home media ==
The film was released on VHS by A-Pix Entertainment and DVD by Simitar Entertainment in 1997. Both releases have been long out of print.

On December 13, 2016, Vinegar Syndrome released the film for the first time on Blu-ray. It includes the film digitally remastered in a 2K presentation. Special features included an audio commentary, a video introduction by director Michael Cooney, and a video interview with actor Scott MacDonald and director of photography Dean Lent. In December 21–28, 2021, MDV Rewind released the film on DVD and Blu-ray.

== See also ==
- List of Christmas films
