= Devil's Den (film) =

- Directed by: Jeff Burr
- Written by: Mitch Gould
- Produced by: John Duffy; Mitch Gould
- Starring: Kelly Hu; Devon Sawa; Ken Foree; Steven Schub
- Cinematography: Viorel Sergovici
- Edited by: Louis Cioffi
- Music by: Jon Lee
- Distributed by: IDT Entertainment
- Release date: October 22, 2006
- Running time: 84 minutes
- Country: United States
- Language: English

Devil's Den is a 2006 horror film directed by Jeff Burr. It stars Kelly Hu and Devon Sawa.

== Plot ==
A group of pleasure-seeking young adults enter a strip club and discover that it is a Satanic establishment that requires them to check their souls at the door. In order to make it through the night alive, they have to battle with a horde of blood-drinking she-demons whose power is drawn directly from the Lord of the Underworld.

== Cast ==
- Kelly Hu as Caitlin
- Devon Sawa as Quinn
- Ken Foree as Leonard
- Steven Schub as Nick
- Karen Maxwell as Candy
- Dawn Olivieri as Jezebel
- Ken Ohara as Zatoichi

== Release ==
The film was released on DVD by Starz Home Entertainment on February 13, 2007. It was later released by Anchor Bay Entertainment on May 14 that same year.

== Reception ==
Juliet Farmer from DVD Talk gave the film 2.5 out of 5 stars, criticizing the film's dialogue, and cheesy special effects. However, Farmer concluded, "Between the funny dialogue and chemistry between the characters, I was able to overlook the poor attempts at scary effects and enjoy Devil's Den for the light romp it is." Michael Gingold reviewed the film for Fangoria, where he wrote that "Gould’s martial arts and swordplay staging is technically well-done but overly familiar, and the final reels attempt a weighty character dilemma that the previously camp-infused storyline can’t support."
