= F. William Parker =

American film, stage and television actor

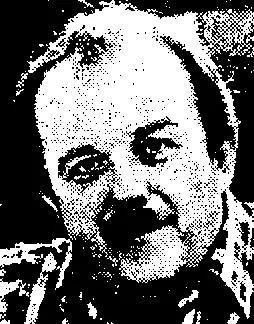
- Parker in 1982
- Born: November 13, 1941 (age 84)
- Education: Rockford University
- Occupations: Film, stage and television actor

F. William Parker (born November 13, 1941) is an American film, stage and television actor.

== Life and career ==
Parker was raised in Rockford, Illinois, the son of Francis Parker. He attended Rockford University, earning his degree in drama. He began his stage career in the 1960s. He played a ragpicker in the stage play Madwoman in 1967, and in 1968, he played Nickles in the stage play J.B. In 1972, he starred as President Benjamin Franklin in the stage play 1776 at Rock Valley College. He then began his screen career in 1974, appearing in the film Crazy Joe. In 1977, he appeared in the film Kill Me If You Can.

Later in his career, Parker guest-starred in numerous television programs including The Love Boat, The Waltons, Starsky & Hutch, Happy Days (and its spin-off Laverne & Shirley), Barney Miller, The Dukes of Hazzard, Taxi, The Greatest American Hero, Wings, The West Wing, Seinfeld, Married... with Children, Hill Street Blues, Days of Our Lives, Archie Bunker's Place and The Golden Girls. He also appeared in films such as Jack Frost, Jinked!, Personal Foul, Iron Eagle, Terms of Endearment, Switch and Little Giants. During his screen career, in 1987, he played an unsuccessful barrister in the stage play Chinamen.
