= The Brothers Flub =

German-American animated series (1999–2000)

- The cover of Plan C: Panic!, depicting Guapo (left) and Fraz
- Genre: Fantasy; Comic science fiction
- Created by: David Burke; Laslo Nosek
- Directed by: Thom Kins; Bert Ring
- Voices of: Scott Menville; Jerry Sroka; Charlotte Rae; Ron Hale; Christine Cavanaugh
- Theme music composer: Nathan Wang
- Countries of origin: United States; Germany
- Original language: English
- No. of seasons: 1
- No. of episodes: 26 (52 segments)

Production
- Executive producers: Wolfgang Heidrich; C.J. Kettler
- Running time: 22–26 minutes (11–13 minutes per segment)
- Production companies: Ravensburger Film + TV; Videal; Sunbow Entertainment; Sony Wonder Television

Original release
- Network: Nickelodeon (United States); Super RTL (Germany)
- Release: January 16, 1999 – January 8, 2000

The Brothers Flub is a children's animated television series created by David Burke and Laslo Nosek for Nickelodeon. It was produced by Sunbow Entertainment and Sony Wonder Television in co-production with Ravensburger Film + TV and Videal. For only one year, Nickelodeon billed the show as its original programming despite it not being a Nicktoon. The show's title characters are a pair of alien brothers named Guapo and Fraz, both of whom work as couriers, as they travel throughout their universe to deliver packages to a different planet in each episode of the series. It ran from January 16, 1999, until January 8, 2000 and was widely panned by critics, who compared it unfavorably to actual Nicktoons. It has since been disowned by Nickelodeon.

== Summary ==
The Brothers Flub takes place in outer space. The show's title refers to its two central characters: a pair of blue-furred alien brothers named Guapo and Fraz Flub. Guapo is shorter and fatter than his brother, and is a lighter shade of blue. Both wear spacesuits, shoes and caps.

In the series, they work for a company called RetroGrade Interdimensional Couriers, of which a green-colored female alien named Tarara Boomdeyay is the boss. Other characters at their job include a female alien named Valerina and an older orange, male alien named Squish. The brothers, who are couriers, travel through their universe in their spacecraft (called the Hoog) to deliver packages to various planets. Each episode features a different planet with a different characteristic, such as "The Land of Oversized Games", which comprises life-sized game pieces such as a pinball machine, or "Hip City", a planet inhabited by beatnik aliens.

== Production ==
The show was produced by Sunbow Entertainment, at the time a subsidiary of Sony Wonder. creators marketed the series for children ages six through eleven. Sunbow contracted with Animatics, an Orlando, Florida-based company, allowing for Animatics to create the storyline and the storyboard for the series. Laura Sullivan, the senior director of marketing of Sony Wonder, said in a 1999 Promo article that the series attracted equal numbers of male and female children and that it was "very Nickelodeon-looking." Despite the show’s end credits having a copyright label of 1998, the series was delayed for a year from its original scheduled debut.

== Episodes ==
No.	Title	Written by	Directed by
1	Wrestlemaniacs	Story by: Dan Danko & Tom Mason; Teleplay by: Raldolph Heard	Thom Kins & Bert Ring
1	Bard Brain	Doug Langdale	Thom Kins & Bert Ring
2	Queen Bees	Story by: Dan Danko & Tom Mason; Teleplay by: Ralph Soll	Thom Kins
2	Fitness Freaks	Doug Langdale	Thom Kins
3	Flub, Flub and Away	Story by: Dan Danko & Tom Mason; Teleplay by: Ralph Soll	Thom Kins & Bert Ring
3	Cookie Crumbles	Story by: Dan Danko & Tom Mason; Teleplay by: Kati Rocky	Thom Kins & Bert Ring
4	Village Idiots	Dan Danko & Tom Mason	Bert Ring & Thom Kins
4	Flubs Overeasy	Steve Brasfield	Bert Ring & Thom Kins
5	Hair Brains	Dan Danko & Tom Mason	Thom Kins
5	Tiresome Twosome	David Burke	Thom Kins
6	Pizza! Pizza!	Story by: Dan Danko & Tom Mason; Teleplay by: Steve Brasfield	Thom Kins
6	Bad Judgement Day	Andrew Brenner	Thom Kins
7	Snow Doomed	Story by: Dan Danko & Tom Mason; Teleplay by: Andrew Brenner	Thom Kins
7	Guapos Galore	Story by: Dan Danko & Tom Mason; Teleplay by: Shaun McLaughlin	Thom Kins
8	Tarara Birthdeeyay	Andrew Brenner	Bert Ring & Thom Kins
8	Big Business	Story by: Dan Danko & Tom Mason; Teleplay by: Andrew Brenner	Bert Ring & Thom Kins
9	Cold Soreheads	Story by: Dan Danko & Tom Mason; Teleplay by: Ralph Soll	Thom Kins
9	Operation Flubpossible	Story by: Dan Danko & Tom Mason; Teleplay by: Andrew Brenner	Thom Kins
10	Warped Speed	Kati Rocky	Bert Ring & Thom Kins
10	Double Feature	Dan Danko & Tom Mason	Bert Ring & Thom Kins
11	A Courier's Carol	Dan Danko & Tom Mason	Bert Ring & Thom Kins
11	Boys Toys	Story by: Dan Danko & Tom Mason; Teleplay by: Raldolph Heard	Bert Ring & Thom Kins
12	Sore Loser	David Burke	Thom Kins
12	Paradise Shmaradise	David Burke	Thom Kins
13	Finder's Keepers	Steve Brasfield	Bert Ring & Thom Kins
13	Shrinky Dinky	Andrew Brenner	Bert Ring & Thom Kins
14	Teacher's Pest	Dan Danko & Tom Mason	Bert Ring & Thom Kins
14	Yippy-Ki-Yay	Dan Danko & Tom Mason	Thom Kins
15	It's a Mystery	Ralph Soll	Thom Kins
15	For the Birds	Shaun McLaughlin	Thom Kins
16	Unlucky Charmers	Don Priess & Susie Singer	Thom Kins
16	Bunch of Trouble	Story by: Dan Danko, Tom Mason & Kati Rocky; Teleplay by: Dan Danko & Tom Mason	Thom Kins
17	Madman Mambo	David Burke	Thom Kins & Bert Ring
17	Guapo's Funhouse	Dan Danko & Tom Mason	Thom Kins & Bert Ring
18	Heads Up	Story by: Dan Danko & Tom Mason; Teleplay by: Ralph Soll	Thom Kins
18	Pay Dirt	Andrew Brenner	Thom Kins
19	Bosom Buddies	Dan Danko & Tom Mason	Thom Kins
19	Mother's Little Helpers	Shaun McLaughlin	Thom Kins
20	Wishmasters	Dan Danko & Tom Mason	Thom Kins
20	Train in Vain	Dan Danko & Tom Mason	Thom Kins
21	Fatal Distraction	David Burke	Thom Kins
21	Just Deserts	Ralph Soll	Thom Kins
22	Good Sports	Dan Danko & Tom Mason	Thom Kins
22	Sidekicked	Rick Gitelson	Thom Kins
23	Playtime	Dave Polsky	Thom Kins
23	On My Case	Dan Danko & Tom Mason	Thom Kins
24	Family Outing	David Burke	Thom Kins
24	Talent Show Offs	Dan Danko & Tom Mason	Thom Kins
25	Thanks for the Memories	David Burke	Thom Kins
25	Sloppy Sentiment	Dan Danko & Tom Mason	Thom Kins
26	Scared Stiff	David Burke	Thom Kins
26	Prehysteria	Story by: Dan Danko & Tom Mason; Teleplay by: Ralph Soll	Thom Kins

== Cast ==
=== Main cast ===
- Guapo Flub: Jerry Sroka
- Fraz Flub: Scott Menville
- Tarara Boomdeyay: Charlotte Rae
- Squish: Ron Hale
- Valerina: Christine Cavanaugh

=== Additional voices ===
- Richard Horvitz
- Mariette Hartley
- Joe Lala
- John Kassir
- Jerry Sroka
- Tim Curry
- Candi Milo
- Jeff Bennett
- H. Richard Greene
- Michael Bell
- Pat Fraley
- Sally Struthers
- Roger Rose
- Kevin Michael Richardson
- Jennifer Darling
- Bruce Eckstart
- Tom Shell
- Gayiel Von
- Nick Bakay
- Tress MacNeille
- Harvey Korman
- Estelle Harris
- Marsha Clark: Judy Hen
- Stuart Pankin
- Gregg Berger
- Gary Littman
- Vanessa Marshall
- Peter Ratray
- Dee Bradley Baker
- Lori Alan
- Jim Ward
- Billie Hayes
- Michael Horton
- Tom Kenny
- Tommy Widmer: Bob

== Crew ==
- Charlie Adler - Voice Director

== Merchandising ==
The Brothers Flub was used in several promotional deals for various brands. Fast food chain KFC announced that it would use the characters in a kids' meal, while Carl's Jr. and Hardee's branded tray liners and bags with The Brothers Flub images. GNC planned to include The Brothers Flub yo-yos in its children's vitamins, while department store chain Macy's used the characters in their back-to-school advertising flyers. Skechers started a sweepstakes that distributed Skechers and The Brothers Flub-branded items.

=== VHS release ===
Sony Wonder released two videocassettes of the show in 2000. These were entitled Plan C: Panic! and Doom Wears Funny Tights!. Each one featured four episodes of the series. Both tapes are now out of print and hard to find.

VHS releases were planned for the series by Maverick in the United Kingdom, but in the end, no releases came to fruition.

== Reception ==
The Brothers Flub was panned by critics. Joanne Weintraub of the Milwaukee Journal-Sentinel described the show as "a rare clinker with all the noisy hyperactivity of Aaahh!!! Real Monsters and little of the cockeyed charm." The Hollywood Reporter called it "a somewhat vacuous effort that lacks the charm and substance of much of Nick's other programming" but added "now and again [the creators] hit on some clever high jinks." Writing for the Lakeland Ledger, Evan Levine thought that the show had a promising premise, but thought that its humor was mean-spirited. To this day, Nickelodeon has since disowned this show as a Nicktoon.

== See also ==
- Butt Ugly Martians
- The Cramp Twins
