= Duane Whitaker =

American character actor (born 1959)

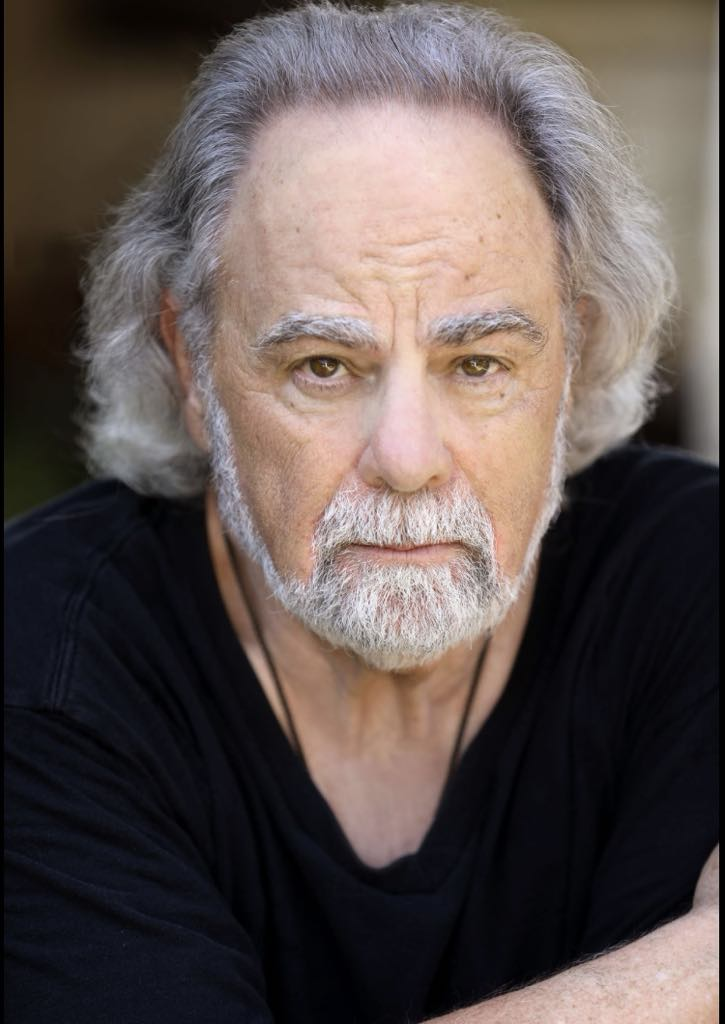
- Whitaker in 2026
- Born: Nathan Duane Whitaker Jr. June 23, 1959 (age 67); Abilene, Texas, U.S.
- Occupations: Actor; director; writer
- Years active: 1979–present

Nathan Duane Whitaker Jr. (born June 23, 1959) is an American character actor.

== Early life ==
Whitaker was born in Abilene, Texas, the oldest child of Nathan Duane Whitaker Sr. and Barbara Ella Hudson, a nurse. He has two younger sisters, both born in Lubbock, Texas. Whitaker graduated from Monterey High School.

== Career ==
Whitaker is probably best known for his role in Quentin Tarantino's 1994 film Pulp Fiction as Maynard, the sadistic pawn shop owner. He wrote and portrayed the title role in Eddie Presley (based on his own successful stage play). Whitaker also wrote, directed and appeared in Together and Alone.

Other notable roles include; a racist cop in Tales from the Hood, Boss Man in Feast, The Sheriff in Trailer Park of Terror, Luther in From Dusk Till Dawn 2: Texas Blood Money (which he also co-wrote), Buddy in Dead Letters, Winslow in Broke Sky, Mickey in Cordoba Nights Dr. Bankhead in The Devil's Rejects and Road Rash in Hobgoblins.

Whitaker has appeared in the feature films Getting Grace, Give Till It Hurts, A Dark Foe, Night Club, Halloween II and Lionhead. On TV, Whitaker appeared on the Cold Case episode "The Brush Man" and filmed a recurring role in the FX series The Bridge. Whitaker has also written numerous screenplays including Stripteaser.

On March 31, 2010, American Cinematheque hosted a screening of Eddie Presley and "Together and Alone" at Grauman's Egyptian Theatre in Los Angeles. In 2016, "Together and Alone" was shown again through the American Cinemateque at the Spielberg Theater with Garrett Clancy's "Dead Letters". Whitaker has also taught acting classes in Los Angeles for over twenty years

== Awards and nominations ==
Year	Result	Award	Category	Work
2022	Winner	Idyllwild International Festival of Cinema Festival	Best Supporting Actor—Feature	Edge of Town

Year	Result	Award	Category	Work
2020	Winner	Hollywood Blood Horror Festival	Best Acting Ensemble	Mark of the Rougarou

Year	Result	Award	Category	Work
2017	Nominated	Northeast Film Festival	Best Supporting Actor – Feature Film	Getting Grace

== Filmography ==
=== Film ===
Year	Title	Role	Notes
1988	Hobgoblins	Roadrash	
1988	Deadly Dreams	Mr. Perkins	
1990	Leatherface: The Texas Chainsaw Massacre III	Kim	
1990	Marked for Murder	O'Donnel	
1990	Vice Academy Part 2	Long John	
1991	Dark Rider	Cash	
1992	Eddie Presley	Eddie Presley	Also writer
1994	Saturday Night Special	Reno	
1994	Pulp Fiction	Maynard	
1994	Puppet Master 5: The Final Chapter	Scott	
1995	Tales from the Hood	Billy	
1995	Stripteaser	Zipper's Clown Palace Patron	Also writer
1995	Night of the Scarecrow	Deputy #1	
1997	The Haunted Sea	Andy Delgado	
1998	Spoiler	Sergeant	
1998	Together & Alone	Zevo	Also writer and director
1999	From Dusk Till Dawn 2: Texas Blood Money	Luther	Also writer
2000	Tempest Eye	Milo	
2002	Out of These Rooms	Dale	
2002	Groom Lake	Dr. Stevens	
2003	The Low Budget Time Machine	Pinky	
2003	Harold Buttleman, Daredevil Stuntman	Mitch	
2005	The Devil's Rejects	Dr. Bankhead	
2005	Feast	Boss Man	
2007	Cordoba Nights	Mickey	
2007	Broke Sky	Sheriff Winslow	
2007	Urban Decay	Burly Bum	
2007	Dead Letters	Buddy	
2008	Trailer Park of Terror	Sheriff Keys	
2008	Rex	Marcus Cotter	
2009	The Butcher	Car Buyer	
2009	Halloween II	Sherman Benny	
2009	Albino Farm	Jeremiah	
2010	Dozers	Phil	
2011	Children of the Corn: Genesis	Pritchett	
2011	Night Club	Intimidating Inmate	
2011	Exodus Fall	Marty	
2012	Bad Ass	Rex / Pawn Shop Owner	
2013	Lionhead	Phil	
2014	Scammerhead	Dongren	
2017	Getting Grace	Reverend Osburn	
2017	Trafficked	Joe Mac	
2018	American Nightmares	Mechanic	
2019	3 from Hell	Dr. Bankhead	Uncredited
2020	A Dark Foe	Bobby	
2020	Disrupted	Tom Cushing	
2020	My Brothers' Crossing	Mike Price	
2021	Natasha Hall	Mickey Simpson	
2021	Edge of Town	Dodge	
2022	Sally Floss: Digital Detective	Frank	
2022	Give Till It Hurts	Job	
2022	The Red Tide Massacre	Charlie	

=== Television ===
Year	Title	Role	Notes
1986	Sledge Hammer!	Fighting Husband	Episode: "Hammer Gets Nailed"
1986	9 to 5	The Weasel	Episode: "The Party"
1986	Superior Court	Detective	Episode: "Adoption Undone"
1987	L.A. Law	Process Server	Episode: "The Douglas Fur Ball"
1987	Mr. Belvedere	Man #5	Episode: "Jobless"
1987	Sidekicks	Bandit II	Episode: "The Patusani Always Rings Twice"
1987	Throb	Supplier	Episode: "Two Flights Up"
1987	Hard Copy	Maintenance Man	2 episodes
1987	Private Eye	Assistant Director	Episode: "Blue Movie"
1988	Highway to Heaven	Man	Episode: "Time in a Bottle"
1989	Murder, She Wrote	Drunk	Episode: "Jack and Bill"
1990	Rich Men, Single Women	Mechanic	Television film
1990	Normal Life	Sam	Episode: "P.O.V."
1990	Roseanne	Mike	Episode: "Trick or Treat"
1990	Quantum Leap	Maintenance Man	Episode: "A Little Miracle"
1993	Space Rangers	Roacher	Episode: "Death Before Dishonor"
1995	Planet Rules	Chet	Episode: "Planet Rules"
1996	Within the Rock	Potter	Television film
2004	I'm with Her	Bouncer / Skinny	Episode: "Party of Two"
2004	Medical Investigation	Bar Owner	Episode: "Little Girl"
2008	The Ex List	Ike	Episode: "Protect and Serve"
2009	Cold Case	Kevin Drew	Episode: "The Bush Man"
2013	The Bridge	Border Agent Paul Thorn	2 episodes
2014	Justified	Patron	Episode: "Raw Deal"
2015	Workaholics	Uncle Tuck	Episode: "Gramps DeMamp Is Dead"
2015	Instant Mom	Chip Swanson	Episode: "Don't Worry, Be Maggie"
2016	Rush Hour	Hutch	Episode: "Badass Cop"
