= Scott MacDonald (actor) =

American actor

- Occupation: Actor
- Years active: 1993–present

Scott MacDonald is an American actor. He is best known for his recurring roles as Captain Manning on short-lived series Threshold, Burley from HBO series Carnivàle, and as Commander Dolim from Star Trek: Enterprise, as the title character from 1997 horror film Jack Frost, and Officer Gerard from Dexter.

== Filmography ==
=== Film ===
Year	Title	Role	Notes
1993	Fire in the Sky	Dan Walton	
1995	3 Ninjas Knuckle Up	Eddy	
1996	A Rat's Tale	Rudi Rake-Rat (voice)	
1997	Jack Frost	Jack Frost	
1998	William Psychspeare's The Taming of the Shrink	Bulbis	
1998	The Rat Pack	Tourist	
1999	Babylon 5: A Call to Arms	First Officer	
1999	Bad City Blues	Mack	
1999	Seven Girlfriends	Scot the Jogger	
2000	Jack Frost 2: Revenge of the Mutant Killer Snowman	Jack Frost (voice)	Direct-to-video
2004	Straight Into Darkness	Deming	
2005	Jarhead	D.I. Fitch	
2008	American Crude	Mr. Snow	
2010	Changing Hands	USP Clerk	
2010	Open 24 Hours	Frank	Short
2011	Water for Elephants	Blackie	
2014	The Big Bad City	Steve	
2019	3 Day Weekend	Sledge	
2020	The Call of the Wild	Dawson	
2020	The Last Champion	Keith Gibson	

=== Television ===
Year	Title	Role	Notes
1993-1995	Star Trek: Deep Space Nine	Tosk, Goran'Agar	Episodes: "Captive Pursuit" & "Hippocratic Oath"
1993	Star Trek: The Next Generation	Subcommander N'Vek	Episode: "Face of the Enemy"
1994	Law & Order	Brown	Episode: "Old Friends"
1995	Space: Above and Beyond	Hatfield	Episode: "Stay with the Dead"
1995	Star Trek: Voyager	Ensign Rollins	Episode: "Caretaker"
1996	Frasier	Henry	Episode: "Come Lie With Me"
1996	Kindred: The Embraced	Paul "Paulie" Boyle	Episode: "Prince of the City"
1996	NYPD Blue	Donald Carter	Episode: "Where'd the Van Gogh?"
1998	Conan	Vog's General	Episode: "Red Sonja"
1998	Chicago Hope	Large Drunk	Episode: "The Things We Do for Love"
1998–2005	JAG	Joseph Mazzone, Officer Balking	2 episodes
2000	Charmed	Krell	Episode: "Sleuthing with the Enemy"
2000–2007	ER	Detective	2 episodes
2001	Family Law	US Marshal #1	Episode: "Americans"
2001	The X-Files	Curtis Delario	Episode: "Salvage"
2001–2002	The Practice	Detective Disaia	2 episodes
2003	CSI: Crime Scene Investigation	Harold Haskins, Truck Driver	Episode: "Recipe for Murder"
2003	Crossing Jordan	Hubbard	Episode: " Dead Wives' Club"
2003	Stargate SG-1	Jarlath	Episode: "Space Race"
2003	The Lyon's Den	Security Guard	Episode: "Trick or Treat"
2003	The District	Anderson Hess	Episode: "Jupiter for Sale"
2003	NCIS	ATF Agent Roger Cooke	Episode: "Split Decision"
2003–2004	Star Trek: Enterprise	Commander Dolim	8 episodes
2003–2005	Carnivàle	Burley	14 episodes
2005	The West Wing	Cyrus Yolander	Episode: "Ninety Miles Away"
2005-2006	Threshold	Captain Manning	4 episodes
2006	Dexter	Officer Gerald	Episode: "Love American Style"
2006	Boston Legal	Officer Michael Minden	Episode: "Breast in Show"
2006	Numb3rs	Lt. Larry Burchfield	Episode: "All's Fair"
2008	Monk	Chief of Boat	Episode: "Mr. Monk Is Underwater"
2009	Without a Trace	Detective Wayne Stevens	Episode: "Once Lost"
2010	Regular Show	Major Williams (voice)	Episode: "Grilled Cheese Deluxe"
2011	Harry's Law	I.C.E. Agent	Episode: "American Dreams"
2011	United States of Tara	Larry Pierzynski	2 episodes
2011	Prime Suspect	Brian O'Malley	Episode: "Wednesday's Child"
2012	NCIS: Los Angeles	Rich Mayfield	Episode: "Sans Voir (Part I)"
2012	Major Crimes	Dale Fisher	Episode: "Citizen's Arrest"
2013	Mob City	Dewey	Episode: "Red Light"
2015	Scorpion	Rescue Chopper Pilot	Episode: "Young Hearts Spark Fire"
2017	Bosch	Tom Riddell	Episode: "Birdland"

=== Video games ===
Year	Title	Role	Notes
1996	Star Trek: Klingon	Qua'lon	FMV
2002	Red Faction 2	Male 2	
2002	Steel Battalion		
2003	Enter the Matrix		
2004	X-Men Legends	Gambit, Sentinel #1	
2005	Twisted Metal: Head-On	Axel, Agent Shepard	
2005	X-Men Legends II: Rise of Apocalypse	Gambit, Mikhail Rasputin	
2006	Marvel: Ultimate Alliance	Nick Fury, Corsair, Dum Dum Dugan, Cyclops, Announcer, Dark Cyclops	
2007	TimeShift	Occupant Insurgent	
2008	Too Human	Marten, Wolf Leader, Pilot #1, Valiant #1	
2008	Dead Space	Additional Voices	
2009	Prototype	Additional Voices	
2009	Bionic Commando	Gottfried Groeder, Prison Guard, BioReign Soldier	
2009	Final Fantasy XIII	Cocoon Inhabitants	English Dub
2011	Thor: God of Thunder	Warlod	
2011	L.A. Noire	Jacob Henry	
2014	Star Wars: The Old Republic - Shadow of Revan	Captain Milenec, Corellian Run Scoundrel, Revanite Commander	
2016	Mafia III	Additional Voices	
