= The Ensigns of Command =

- Star Trek: The Next Generation episode
- Episode no.: Season 3 Episode 2
- Directed by: Cliff Bole
- Written by: Melinda M. Snodgrass
- Cinematography by: Marvin Rush
- Production code: 149
- Original air date: October 2, 1989

Guest appearances
- Eileen Seeley as Ard'rian McKenzie; Mark L. Taylor as Haritath; Richard Allen as Kentor; Colm Meaney as Miles O'Brien; Mart McChesney as Sheliak; Christopher Collins as Sheliak (voice); Grainger Hines as Gosheven (uncredited, voice redubbed)

Episode chronology
← Previous "Evolution"	Next → "The Survivors"
- Star Trek: The Next Generation season 3

"The Ensigns of Command" is the second episode of the third season of the syndicated American science fiction television series Star Trek: The Next Generation, the 50th episode overall, first broadcast on October 2, 1989.

Set in the 24th century, the series follows the adventures of the Starfleet crew of the Federation starship Enterprise-D. In this episode, Lieutenant Commander Data (Brent Spiner) must convince a reluctant colony of more than 15,000 to prepare for immediate evacuation while Captain Picard (Patrick Stewart) attempts to negotiate a three-week reprieve from aliens intent on colonizing the planet themselves in four days and wiping out any humans found there.

== Plot ==
The Enterprise, under the command of Captain Jean-Luc Picard (Patrick Stewart), receives a message from the Sheliak, a reclusive alien race: Remove the humans on their planet Tau Cygni V within three days, or the Sheliak will exterminate them.

Picard sends Lt. Cmdr. Data (Brent Spiner), an android, to the planet to coordinate the evacuation, but the colony's leader Gosheven (Grainger Hines) refuses. He argues the colonists have worked too hard to establish the colony and would rather fight the Sheliak than leave. Another colonist, Ard’rian McKenzie, tries to help Data persuade the colonists to evacuate. At one point, she kisses him, telling him that he seemed like he needed it. Data makes several attempts via rhetoric and political maneuvering to persuade the colonists to evacuate, but he wins over only a few. Gosheven uses the colony's aqueduct as proof of the colonists' ability to overcome adversity. As a show of force, Data destroys the aqueduct with a phaser and informs the colonists the Sheliak are even more powerful, capable of destroying them from orbit, and the colonists would die never seeing their killers. Gosheven reluctantly agrees to the evacuation. Data tells him that the aqueduct is "just a thing", and that "things can be replaced, but lives cannot."

Due to radiation rendering the transporters useless, it will take three weeks to evacuate the planet, but the Sheliak insist on their time limit of three days. In response, Picard exploits a loophole in the treaty between the Sheliak and the Federation: he demands the dispute be resolved by third-party arbitrators, who will not be available for six months. Outmaneuvered, the Sheliak agree to allow three weeks. As Data prepares to return to the Enterprise, Ard'rian comes to say goodbye, confessing that she will miss him, to which Data responds by kissing her, telling her that she appeared to need it. She concludes that he saw she was unhappy, and did what he concluded would make her feel better; Data agrees and returns to the Enterprise.

Aboard the Enterprise, Picard comments on Data's fusion of two very different musicians' styles in a musical performance, as well as his creative approach to convincing the colonists. Data concedes that he has become more creative.

== Reception ==
The A.V. Club gave it B+. Tor.com gave it 7 out of 10.

== Releases ==
The episode was released with Star Trek: The Next Generation season three DVD box set, released in the United States on July 2, 2002. This had 26 episodes of Season 3 on seven discs, with a Dolby Digital 5.1 audio track. It was released in high-definition Blu-ray in the United States on April 30, 2013.

This was released in Japan on LaserDisc on July 5, 1996, in the half season set Log. 5: Third Season Part.1 by CIC Video. This included episodes from "The Ensigns of Command" (also "Evolution") to "A Matter of Perspective" on 12-inch double sided optical discs. The video was in NTSC format with both English and Japanese audio tracks.
