= A Dark Foe =

- Directed by: Maria Gabriela Cardenas
- Written by: Oscar Cardenas; Maria Gabriela Cardenas
- Starring: Oscar Cardenas; Kenzie Dalton; Selma Blair
- Cinematography: Jon Aguirresarobe
- Music by: Tim Jones
- Distributed by: Vertical Entertainment
- Release date: February 10, 2020 (Hollywood Reel Independent Film Festival); July 13, 2021 (United States)
- Country: United States
- Language: English

A Dark Foe is a 2020 American independent crime-thriller film directed by Maria Gabriela Cardenas and starring her father Oscar Cardenas, Kenzie Dalton, Graham Greene and Selma Blair.

== Cast ==
- Oscar Cardenas as Tony Cruz
- Kenzie Dalton as Rebecca / Lana
- Graham Greene as The Cradle
- Selma Blair as Dr. Doris Baxter
- Tokala Black Elk as Young Cradle
- Bill Bellamy as Rocco
- Jon Lindstrom as Vincent
- Glenn Morshower as Special Agent Stewart
- Julie Gonzalo as Theresa
- Harlow Frances Rocca as Ana
- Shane Almagor as Young Tony
- Trisha Rae Stahl as Onacona
- Monte Markham as Mr. Lorne
- Beverly Todd as Mildred
- Rebekah Kennedy as Albino Girl
- Duane Whitaker as Bobby
- Ireland Baldwin as Madeleine

== Release ==
The film had its official premiere at the 2020 Hollywood Reel Independent Film Festival. It was released in selected theaters and on demand on July 13, 2021.

== Reception ==
On the review aggregator website Rotten Tomatoes, 60% of 5 critics' reviews are positive.
