= Down and Out in Beverly Hills (TV series) =

- Genre: Sitcom
- Based on: Down and Out in Beverly Hills
- Developed by: Howard Gewirtz
- Starring: Héctor Elizondo; Anita Morris
- Composer: David Michael Frank
- Country of origin: United States
- Original language: English
- No. of seasons: 1
- No. of episodes: 13 (5 unaired)

Production
- Running time: 30 minutes
- Production company: Touchstone Television

Original release
- Network: Fox
- Release: April 26 – September 12, 1987

Down and Out in Beverly Hills is an American sitcom based on the 1986 movie of the same name. It aired from April 26 to September 12, 1987, on the fledgling Fox network. It has the distinction of being the first ever show to be cancelled by Fox; 5 of the 13 produced episodes did not air.

The cast included Héctor Elizondo as Dave Whiteman (Richard Dreyfuss' character in the movie), Anita Morris as Barbara Whiteman (Bette Midler's character in the movie), Eileen Seeley as Jenny Whiteman (Tracy Nelson's character in the movie), April Ortiz as Carmen the Maid (Elizabeth Peña's character from the movie), and Tim Thomerson as Jerry Baskin (Nick Nolte's character in the movie). Evan Richards (Max Whiteman) was the only cast member of the film to reprise his role for TV (except for Mike the dog). Despite the somewhat different characterization of the show as compared to the movie, various references, especially in the third episode, establish that they take place in the same fictional universe.

== Cast ==
- Héctor Elizondo as Dave Whiteman
- Anita Morris as Barbara Whiteman
- Evan Richards as Max Whiteman
- Eileen Seeley as Jenny Whiteman
- Tim Thomerson as Jerry Baskin
- April Ortiz as Carmen

== Episodes ==
No.	Title	Directed by	Written by	Original release date
1	"Jerry's Mission"	Bill Foster	Howard Gewirtz	April 26, 1987
2	"Something Mild"	Unknown	Robert Bruce & Martin Weiss	July 25, 1987
3	"Skin Tight"	Unknown	Robert Keats	August 1, 1987
4	"Max Bedroom"	Unknown	Unknown	August 8, 1987
5	"Altared States"	Unknown	Unknown	August 15, 1987
6	"Shapiro's Carmen"	Unknown	Unknown	August 22, 1987
7	"Dancing in the Dark"	Unknown	Unknown	September 5, 1987
8	"You Ought to Be in Pictures"	Linda Day	Robert Bruce & Martin Weiss	September 12, 1987
9	"A Fistful of Dollars"	N/A	Al Aidekman	Unaired
10	"For a Few Dollars More"	N/A	Robert Bruce & Martin Weiss	Unaired
11	"Jerry Jumps Right In"	N/A	Howard Gewirtz	Unaired
12	"The Legend That Is Barbara"	N/A	Howard Gewirtz	Unaired
13	"Jerry Strikes Out"	N/A	Robert Bruce & Martin Weiss	Unaired
