= Fredrick Davis (dancer) =

American ballet dancer (born 1986)

- Born: Fredrick Eric Davis; March 27, 1986 (age 39); Brooklyn, New York
- Education: Chattanooga High School Center for Creative Arts; Joffrey Ballet School
- Occupation: Ballet dancer
- Years active: 2008–present
- Career
- Former groups: Roxey Ballet; Dance Theatre of Harlem; Indiana Ballet Theatre

Fredrick Eric Davis (born March 27, 1986) is an American ballet dancer and former dancer with the Dance Theatre of Harlem.

== Early life and training ==
Fredrick Eric Davis was born in Brooklyn, New York to Diane and Frederick Jones. His mother later left his father and took Davis with her to raise him in eastern Chattanooga, Tennessee. As a child he lived with his mother in poverty, switching from various apartments to government provided housing. He was periodically homeless, sometimes sleeping in cars and churches, and often ate at a community kitchen until, after social workers got involved, he was adopted by his maternal grandmother, Evie Luvina Dill. Dill encouraged Davis to pursue the arts and got Davis involved in her church, Pilgrim Congregational; a congregation affiliated with the United Church of Christ. After Dill died from cancer, Davis was put under the care of Dr. John Mingus Sr., the pastor at Pilgrim Congregational Church, and his wife Kim Hunt. Davis began dancing when he was eleven years old in 1998, when he auditioned for the Department of Chattanooga Parks and Recreation Dance Alive program offered in collaboration with Ballet Tennessee. He was awarded a Talent Identification Program Scholarship which funded his dance training at the school. While training in dance in the after school program, he was also enrolled in dance classes at the Chattanooga High School Center for Creative Arts, graduating in 2004. He was invited to study at the Joffrey Ballet School, where he trained from 2004 until 2007. While a ballet student at Joffrey, Davis enrolled in summer intensives with American Ballet Theatre, Boston Ballet, and North Carolina Dance Theatre.

== Career ==
Davis danced with the Roxey Ballet Company in New Jersey before he joined the company at Dance Theatre of Harlem in 2008. While at Dance Theatre of Harlem, Davis danced in many roles including the male lead in New Bach, the Pas de Deux from Act III of Swan Lake, in Robert Garland's Return, in George Balanchine's Agon and Alvin Ailey's The Lark Ascending. He performed Agon and The Lark Ascending with Dance Theatre of Harlem at Jacob's Pillow Dance.

After leaving Dance Theatre of Harlem in 2015, Davis participated in a Dance for America tour, was a featured artist with Dallas Black Dance Theatre, danced at the Kennedy Center Honors in Washington, D.C., danced in the Donald McKayle Tribute in Irvine, California, and danced for the Indiana Ballet Theatre. As a freelance artist he has also performed with various ballet companies including Roanoke Ballet Theatre, Greensboro Ballet, San Antonio Metropolitan Ballet, and Dissonance Dance Theater. He is a principal guest artist at Ballet Tennessee and at Ballet Tucson.

Davis' life story was the topic of a documentary, From the Streets to the Stage: The Journey of Fredrick Davis, which was screened in a free premiere at the Tivoli Theatre. The documentary was created by Ann Cater of PBS and was filmed by the Emmy Award-winning crew from WTCI. Davis was presented with a joint City and County Proclamation by Mayor of Chattanooga Andy Berke and Hamilton County Mayor Jim Coppinger.
