= Young at Heart (The X-Files) =

- The X-Files episode
- Episode no.: Season 1 Episode 16
- Directed by: Michael Lange
- Written by: Chris Carter; Scott Kaufer
- Production code: 1X15
- Original air date: February 11, 1994
- Running time: 45 minutes

Guest appearances
- Dick Anthony Williams as Reggie Purdue; Alan Boyce as Young John Barnett; Christine Estabrook as Agent Henderson; Graham Jarvis as NIH Doctor; David Petersen as Old John Barnett; Robin Mossley as Dr. Joe Ridley; Gordon Tipple as Joe Crandall; Jerry Hardin as Deep Throat; William B. Davis as CIA Agent

Episode chronology
← Previous "Lazarus"	Next → "E.B.E."
- The X-Files season 1

"Young at Heart" is the sixteenth episode of the first season of the American science fiction television series The X-Files, premiering on the Fox network on February 11, 1994. It was written by Scott Kaufer and series creator Chris Carter, and directed by Michael Lange. The episode featured guest appearances by Dick Anthony Williams, William B. Davis and Alan Boyce, and saw Jerry Hardin reprise his role as Deep Throat. The episode is a "Monster-of-the-Week" story, unconnected to the series' wider mythology. "Young at Heart" earned a Nielsen household rating of 7.2, being watched by 6.8 million households in its initial broadcast, and received mostly negative reviews from critics.

The show centers on FBI agents Fox Mulder (David Duchovny) and Dana Scully (Gillian Anderson) who work on cases linked to the paranormal, called X-Files. When they aid a former colleague of Mulder's in an investigation into a series of robberies, it becomes apparent that the culprit is an old nemesis of Mulder's—who had seemingly died in prison several years previously.

"Young at Heart" originated as a script from freelance writer Scott Kaufer, who was a friend of Carter and former employee of the comedy development department at Warner Bros. Pictures. Carter rewrote the script, which included the addition of Barnett's salamander hand. Director Michael Lange felt the episode offered him excellent scope to try new techniques, noting that the series producers "encourage cinematic stuff". Davis makes his second appearance of the series in this episode, although his role is simply credited as "CIA Agent" rather than the more well-known "Smoking Man".

== Plot ==
In 1989, Joe Crandall, an inmate at a federal penitentiary in Pennsylvania, hears screaming from the infirmary. Inside, he discovers the prison's doctor, Joe Ridley, amputating the hand of fellow inmate John Barnett. Ridley tells Crandall that Barnett is dead, threatening him with a scalpel. However, as Crandall leaves the room, he sees Barnett blinking.

Five years later, Fox Mulder is notified by his former FBI supervisor, Reggie Purdue, about a note from a jewelry store robbery mocking Mulder by name. Mulder recognizes the message as being from Barnett, a sociopathic multiple murderer whom he helped capture on his first case with the Bureau. Even though Barnett supposedly died in prison, the note bears his handwriting. Purdue shows Dana Scully a video of Barnett's capture, which shows that Mulder didn't fire on Barnett due to him having a hostage, per FBI procedure. Mulder's hesitancy allowed Barnett to kill both the hostage and a fellow agent.

Scully looks into Barnett's cause of death and discovers that despite it being listed as heart attack, he had no history of heart problems; he had been sent to the infirmary due to problems with his hand. Meanwhile, Barnett leaves Mulder another note in his car, along with photos of him and Scully. The agents visit the prison and meet Crandall, who recounts his experiences with Barnett and Ridley. Barnett makes taunting phone calls to Mulder and strangles Purdue with a disfigured hand. Scully looks into Ridley's past and finds that his medical license was revoked for performing illegal medical trials on children with progeria, a disease that causes premature aging. Mulder theorizes that Ridley's experiments helped him find a way to reverse the aging process.

Scully summons Mulder when Ridley suddenly appears at her apartment. He tells the agents that he succeeded in making Barnett age in reverse after replacing his hand using salamander cells. However, Barnett stole Ridley's government-sponsored research. Deep Throat meets with Mulder and confirms Ridley's story, saying that the government is negotiating with Barnett to purchase Ridley's work. Scully hears someone dialing into her answering machine and spots Barnett's fingerprint on it. After Barnett calls again, Mulder decides to set up a sting operation at the cello recital for a friend of Scully's, which Barnett learned about from her answering machine.

That night, FBI agents wait at the concert hall for Barnett's arrival. Barnett, who goes completely unseen due to his youthful appearance, poses as a piano tuner. He shoots Scully in the chest during the recital and flees, taking the cellist hostage. Mulder doesn't hesitate this time and fires at Barnett, fatally wounding him. Scully is revealed to have survived the attack, having worn a bulletproof vest. Despite the efforts of doctors and a mysterious CIA agent to resuscitate Barnett, he dies, and takes the secrets of Ridley's research to the grave. The episode ends with a close-up of a locker in a train station, implying the secrets are contained within and will one day be discovered.

== Production ==
This episode originated as a script from freelance writer Scott Kaufer, who was an acquaintance of series creator Chris Carter and former employee of the comedy development department at Warner Bros. Pictures. Carter rewrote the script, which included the addition of Barnett's salamander hand. The Fox network's standards and practices department fought with the producers over the scene where Barnett strangles Purdue, and as a result, the producers were forced to reduce the length of the scene. The footage of the young girl with progeria was filmed after the production crew contacted the Progeria Society and were put in touch with the family of Courtney Arciaga, who was a young girl with the disease. She and her family were fans of the series and were flown from their San Diego home to Vancouver to shoot the scene.

Director Michael Lange felt the episode offered him excellent scope to try new techniques, noting that the series producers "encourage cinematic stuff". He felt a highlight of this approach was in shooting the episode's climactic stand-off, explaining that "instead of shooting at a normal eye level as the Salamander Man takes the gun, I tilt up, and now I'm shooting up his nose almost, and it was kind of like very disorienting. The show's got a certain ennui that appeals to me, the film noir-y movies of the '40s look, an undercurrent of tension and anxiety 'cause of all the weird things going on".

William B. Davis makes his second appearance of the series in this episode, although his role is simply credited as "CIA Agent", rather than "Smoking Man", as per his credit in the pilot episode. The character of Reggie Purdue would later be referenced in the fourth-season episode "Paper Hearts", and the fifth-season episode "Unusual Suspects".

== Broadcast and reception ==
"Young at Heart" premiered on the Fox network on February 11, 1994. The episode earned a Nielsen household rating of 7.2 with an 11 share, meaning that roughly 7.2 percent of all television-equipped households, and 11 percent of households watching TV, were tuned in to the episode. A total of 6.8 million households watched this episode during its original airing.

Lange said that he "liked the script very much, and I think I stayed fairly close to the original draft. I liked it because it had a good spookiness to it. To me, the intriguing part was the doctor's research into being able to reverse the aging process, which I wish we could have explored more." Executive Producer Robert Goodwin considered the episode one of the most emotional episodes of the first season, due to the time spent working with Courtney Arciaga, the young girl with progeria. In a retrospective of the first season in Entertainment Weekly, the episode was rated a C, being called "far-fetched" and criticized for its unoriginal themes. Zack Handlen, writing for The A.V. Club, described it as "sloppy, poorly edited" and "thoroughly unexciting", pointing out the "forced" nature of the supporting characters' past involvement with Fox Mulder. Matt Haigh, writing for Den of Geek, expressed mixed feelings over the episode, comparing it to Quincy, M.E. and stating that it "just wasn't weird enough" for an episode of The X-Files. "Young at Heart" has been cited, along with the fourth season episode "Paper Hearts", as representing "the supreme irony and the hidden agenda of the series"—in both cases, Mulder, directly through his work on the X-Files, puts information permanently beyond reach by killing those who hold it, showing that "despite the fact that Mulder drives the car, he frequently ends up—and goes—nowhere".

== Footnotes ==
=== References ===
- Edwards, Ted (1996). X-Files Confidential. Little, Brown and Company. ISBN 0-316-21808-1.
- Lovece, Frank (1996). The X-Files Declassified. Citadel Press. ISBN 0-8065-1745-X.
- Lowry, Brian (1995). The Truth is Out There: The Official Guide to the X-Files. Harper Prism. ISBN 0-06-105330-9.
