= Eileen Seeley =

American actress

- Born: 1959 or 1960 (age 66–67); Rockland County, New York, U.S.
- Education: Point Park College (BFA)
- Years active: 1984–2000
- Known for: Down and Out in Beverly Hills; The Ensigns of Command; Batman Forever; Jack Frost
- Spouse: Chip Seaman
- Children: 2

Eileen Marie Seeley is an American actress. She is known for her role as Jenny in the TV series Down and Out in Beverly Hills (1987).

== Early life and education ==
Seeley was born in Rockland County, New York. She graduated from Cumberland Valley High School in Mechanicsburg, Pennsylvania, and earned a Bachelor of Fine Arts in theater and dance at Point Park College in Pittsburgh.

== Personal life ==
Seeley married Chip Seaman with whom she has two sons: Luke and Jack.

== Partial filmography ==
=== Film ===
Year	Title	Role	Ref(s)
1995	Batman Forever	Martha Wayne	
1997	Jack Frost	Anne Tiler	
2000	Jack Frost 2: Revenge of the Mutant Killer Snowman	Anne Tiler	

=== Television ===
Year	Title	Role	Notes	Ref(s)
1984	Family Ties	Roxanne	Episode: "Birthday Boy"	
1987	Down and Out in Beverly Hills	Jenny Whiteman	Recurring role	
1988–1989	Mr. Belvedere	Casey O'Connell	4 episodes	
1989	Star Trek: The Next Generation	Ard'rian McKenzie	Episode: "The Ensigns of Command"	
1989	Freddy's Nightmares	Millie	2 episodes	
1989	Who's the Boss?	Janet Booth	Episode: "Sam's Novel Romance"	
1991	She-Wolf of London	Cathy	Episode: "Curiosity Killed the Cravitz"	
1993	Quantum Leap	Karen Marlet	Episode: "The Beast Within"	
