= 3 Day Weekend =

2019 thriller film

- Directed by: Wyatt McDill
- Written by: Wyatt McDill
- Produced by: Megan Huber
- Starring: Maya Stojan; Morgan Krantz; Nathan Phillips; Scott MacDonald
- Release date: October 23, 2019
- Running time: 79 minutes
- Country: United States
- Box office

3 Day Weekend is a 2019 feature-length puzzle thriller notable for being made with no dialogue. It was written and directed by Wyatt McDill, and produced by Megan Huber who together own the film's production company, Sleeper Cell Films. 3 Day Weekend stars Maya Stojan, Morgan Krantz, Nathan Phillips, and Scott MacDonald through the events of a kidnapping over the course of a three day weekend.

First appearing at a special screening of the film at the Twin Cities Film Festival, 3 Day Weekend had its world premiere at the 2020 Cinequest Film Festival in San Jose, California. In 2020, Showtime bought the broadcast rights for larger distribution, opening availability to North American audiences. 3 Day Weekend was formally released in North America on October 23, 2020.

== Plot ==
Ben decides to go camping to get over a heartbreak and his vantage is our introduction to this story of deception and double-cross.

Shan Russell has a violently abusive husband, Sledge, who partnered with his buddy Schnappsie in a theft nine years previous. Before being apprehended and sent to jail, the two placed the money in a blue safe whose combination only Sledge knows. That went into a red safe whose combination only Schnappsie knows. They tattooed the exact location, near the shore of a remote lake, on Shan’s back. These factors require all three to be alive to retrieve the money. Shan plots to free herself of them and keep the money.

Before their release she gets two identical safes and batters the blue one to make it look like someone tried to force it open. She places it inside the red, leaving the red one opened, then puts them in the bottom of a pit a little inland from the original burial site because she knows Sledge is terrified of water. She hides a GoPro camera near each, positioned so it will record the combination entered.

When the two men are released she texts each of them, pretending to beg for help because she's been kidnapped for the map. Her text to Sledge hints that Schnappsie is involved and trying to double-cross him. This is where Ben bumbles in, camping very near the one where Shan has climbed into the trunk. Unaware of Shan's plotting, Scnhappsie rescues her out of the trunk. He takes Shan in motorboat to the genuine site where he unlocks the red safe. He then prepares to meet up with Sledge. Shan has dropped a note for Ben asking to be rescued from kidnappers, knowing Ben will assume these are Sledge and Schnappsie.

Sledge, arriving a little later than Schnappsie, goes overland to the burial site. He reaches the faked one first, thinking it's genuine. He sees the opened red safe and the battered blue one and assumes Schnappsie has tried to double-cross him. When he meets up with Schnappsie near the site he kills him for that. He tries to open the battered safe, but is unable to. Shan leads him to the genuine safe near the lake shore, pretending the kidnappers set up the decoy. They haul the genuine safe out of the pit and set it near the shore. Shan sees Ben and empties Sledge's rifle by pretending to shoot at Ben. Shan grabs him and runs with him to the fake pit where she hits him on the head with a shovel and starts to bury him in the pit. Sledge see this follows, questioning. Shan sobs, pretending Ben was the other kidnapper. He barely begun burying Ben when he hears a boat's motor. Shan has the safe in the boat with her and she's leaving. Sledge shoots her, not knowing that Shan replaced the pistol's ammunition with a blank. But she pretends to be dead and scuttles the boat. Terrified of water, he forces himself onto a raft and tries to retrieve the safe, but drowns in the process. Shan rescues Ben from the pit, retrieves the GoPro cameras that have recorded the combinations to the safes, then sits at the shore of the lake, watching a buoy she had attached to the safe with a line and a magnet is floating to mark its location.

The story is told from four perspectives. Ben's is of a camping trip touched by a possible kidnapping. Schnappsie's of is a post-prison meetup touched by a kidnapping. Sledge's is of a betrayal. Shan's is of a plan to free herself from the man who damaged her hearing with a beating and his partner who cooperated to tattoo their crime onto her back.

== Cast ==
- Maya Stojan as Shan
- Morgan Krantz as Ben Boyd
- Nathan Phillips as Schnappsie
- Scott MacDonald as Sledge

== Production ==
3 Day Weekend was shot in the countryside near Park Rapids, Minnesota over the course of 17 days.

== Reception ==
3 Day Weekend world premiered at the 2020 Cinequest Film Festival in San Jose, California after winning an Indie Vision Screenplay Award at a special screening of the film at the Twin Cities Film Festival. Showtime bought the North American broadcast rights in 2020. The film has been called "suspenseful and entertaining" by Randy Myers of The Mercury News.
