= The Boy with the X-Ray Eyes (film) =

- Release poster
- Directed by: Jeff Burr
- Screenplay by: Jeff Burr; Scott Phillips
- Story by: Mark Collier; Christopher Mollo
- Starring: Dennis Haskins; Eric Jungmann; Andrew Prine; Timothy Bottoms
- Music by: Dennis Smith
- Production company: Castel Film Romania Full Moon Entertainment Pulsepounders The Kushner-Locke Company
- Distributed by: Tango entertainment Multicom Entertainment Group. Echo Bridge Home Entertainment
- Release date: 1999
- Running time: 93 min.
- Country: United States
- Language: English

The Boy with the X-Ray Eyes is a 1999 adventure/fantasy film directed by Jeff Burr. The plot involves a teenager who finds a special pair of powerful glasses and is visited by aliens who need his help to retrieve a lost item that could destroy Earth. The film was not released on home video until 2005 under the alternate title X-treme Teens.

== Cast ==
- Bryan Neal as Andy Carver
- Dara Hollingsworth as Iris
- Dennis Haskins as Boyd Russell
- Eric Jungmann as Sam (credited as Eric Jungman)
- Dan Zukovic as Lieutenant Biddle
- Andrew Prine as Malcolm Baker
- Timothy Bottoms as John Carver
- Alex Shiglie as Stu
- Jeff Burr as Mr. Wright, Science Teacher
- Dan Fintescu as Kimball
- Toma Danila as Grode
- Ion Bechet as Richie
- Bogdan Petre as Feldon
- Eugenia Maci as Paula
- Gabi Robert Kerekesh as Cameron
- Irina Barladeanu as Malcolm's Wife
- Enoiu Andrei as Rocker Kid
