= Eddie Presley =

- DVD cover
- Directed by: Jeff Burr
- Written by: Duane Whitaker
- Based on: Eddie Presley (play) by Duane Whitaker
- Starring: Duane Whitaker; Lawrence Tierney
- Release date: 1992
- Country: United States
- Language: English

Eddie Presley is a 1992 American dramedy film directed by Jeff Burr and featuring Duane Whitaker in the title role. It is based on a one man show Whitaker had written and performed in Los Angeles.

== Plot ==
Whitaker plays Eddie Presley, a former successful owner of a chain of pizza restaurants who, against the wishes of his father (Joe Estevez) and mother (Whitaker's real-life mother Barbara), decides to sell his business in the pursuit of living his dream of becoming an Elvis Presley impersonator, going so far as to legally change his last name to "Presley". After several years, he's living in his van and desperate for work. After his boss (Lawrence Tierney) fires Presley from his night security job for sleeping (with the Polaroids to back it up), he finally lands a gig in a seedy Hollywood bar (managed by Roscoe Lee Brown). After a technical malfunction, he proceeds to bare his soul to the audience in an improvisational one man show, where he admits to spending time in a psychiatric hospital after suffering a mental breakdown (Bruce Campbell and Quentin Tarantino make cameos as orderlies at the hospital). Meanwhile, in his personal life, Presley has to deal with a cheating girlfriend who ends up working in pornography, while remaining oblivious to a co-worker who truly loves him.

== Release ==
Tempe Video released a two-disc special edition of Eddie Presley in 2004, including a director's cut, commentary with director Burr, cast and crew, and many short subjects about the film, including a tribute to the late Lawrence Tierney.
