= Spoiler (film) =

- DVD cover
- Directed by: Jeff Burr
- Screenplay by: Michael Kalesniko
- Produced by: Barnet Bain
- Starring: Gary Daniels; Meg Foster
- Cinematography: Philip Lee
- Edited by: Amanda I. Kirpaul
- Music by: Marco Marinangeli
- Release date: September 15, 1998
- Running time: 90 minutes (99 minutes in Canada)
- Country: United States
- Language: English

Spoiler is a 1998 American action sci-fi film directed by Jeff Burr and starring Gary Daniels and Meg Foster. It takes place in New York in the far future.

== Plot summary ==
In a futuristic, cyber-punk New York City, convicted felon Roger Mason (Gary Daniels) is serving a sentence and is locked away in a high security prison facility, where Cryonics are applied to some of the inmates, including Mason himself, to keep them in a state of suspended animation. Mason, despite all the security measures applied at his confinement facility, manages to escape repeatedly to see his daughter, which is the only reason why he's making attempt after attempt to break free. However, the authorities are able to catch him and bring him back every time to serve an even longer sentence as punishment for his attempts to escape. Since he's being cryonically frozen to serve his time for years at a time, he remains practically the same age while his daughter grows older normally. As more and more time keeps being added to his original sentence, his escape attempts become more of an obsession rather than a goal.

== Cast ==
- Gary Daniels as Roger Mason
- Meg Foster as Woman #1
- Bryan Genesse as Bounty #1
- Jeffrey Combs as the Captain
- Nicholas Sadler as Renny
- Steven Schub as Phil
- Stewart Finlay-McLennan as Lory*
- Joe Unger as Clemets
- Sarah Freeman as Maggie**
- David Groh as Uncle Hutchy
- Bruce Glover as the Priest
- Jean Speegle Howard as Jillian/Jennifer
- Willard E. Pugh as Bounty #2
- Duane Whitaker as Sergeant
- Arye Gross as The Attendant

*Credited as Stewart McLennan. **Credited as Sarah Rayne.

== Release ==
Spoiler was released directly to video in VHS format on 15 September 1998 in the United States and on 30 November 2000 in Germany. It has also been released on DVD on 12 March 2010 in Germany.

== Critical reception ==
On release, the film was criticized for its special effects and story, but Gary Daniels's performance was praised.
