= Christopher Allport =

American actor (1947–2008)

- Born: Alexander Wise Allport Jr. June 17, 1947; Boston, Massachusetts, U.S.
- Died: January 25, 2008 (aged 60); Wrightwood, California, U.S.
- Occupation: Actor
- Years active: 1973–2008
- Spouses: Carolyn Jones (m. 1979; div. 1990) Susan Hayden (m. 1993)
- Children: 2

Christopher Allport (born Alexander Wise Allport Jr.; June 17, 1947 – January 25, 2008) was an American actor.

== Biography ==
Alexander Wise Allport Jr. was born in Boston. His acting life began at the age of nine in New Canaan, Connecticut, at the Children's Theatre. While at Northwestern University, he worked with director Paul Sills and Story Theatre. He performed in New York with the Public Theater at Lincoln Center, and with Ensemble Studio Theatre; and in Los Angeles at the Taper, South Coast Repertory and with Padua Playwrights. In 2007, he wrote and starred in The Backroad Home, a theatrical memoir with his original music, directed and developed by Paul Linke and produced by his wife, Susan Hayden (Ruskin Group Theatre).

One of his earliest television roles was as Tim McGowan on the soap opera Another World (1973–74). Around 1975 or 1976, Allport did a screen test with actress Amy Irving for the parts of Han Solo and Princess Leia, respectively, for the upcoming filming of the 1977 movie Star Wars. Neither actor got the parts, which went to Harrison Ford and Carrie Fisher, respectively.

His film credits include Savage Weekend, To Live and Die in L.A., Jack Frost, Jack Frost 2: Revenge of the Mutant Killer Snowman, and Garden Party, which was released in 2008. He died shortly after the latter film was completed.

His list of television credits includes appearances on such programs as Midnight Caller, The X-Files, Commander In Chief, ER, Felicity, Mad Men, and Brothers & Sisters.

His role as Andrew Campbell on Mad Men was set to be a recurring one, though he only got to appear in one episode (season one, episode 4: "New Amsterdam"). In season two, after Allport's death, they killed off his character in the American Airlines crash storyline and, later, dedicated the episode to him.

== Personal life ==
Allport was married to author Susan Hayden at the time of his death. He had two sons; Andrew, from a previous marriage to writer/actress Carolyn Allport, and Mason Summit, from his marriage to Hayden.

Allport had written a story about the pleasures of backcountry skiing in the Los Angeles Times in 2004 in which he stated that "any excursion into the mountains requires awareness. Have fun, but be careful."

== Death ==
On January 25, 2008, Allport was one of three men killed by three avalanches near the Mountain High ski resort in Wrightwood, San Bernardino County, California (in the San Gabriel Mountains). There were two other fatalities: Michael McKay, an off-duty member of the resort's ski patrol, and Darin Bodie Coffey. A fourth man, snowboarder Oscar Gonzales, escaped after getting lost and hitting a rock. Winter storms had been recently hitting Southern California; the San Gabriel Mountains, while usually free of avalanches, had been hit by 3 feet (0.91 m) of snow the week before Allport died.

Allport played Pete Campbell's father, Andrew, on the 2007–15 drama series Mad Men during season one. Following Allport's death, his character was killed off from the show during the episode 'Flight 1', where Andrew Campbell is one of those killed in the crash of American Airlines Flight 1 in Jamaica Bay, New York, following take-off on March 1, 1962. The episode is dedicated to Allport's memory.

== Selected filmography ==
=== Film ===
- 1974 Man on a Swing as Richie Tom Keating
- 1976 Savage Weekend as Nicky
- 1977 The Lincoln Conspiracy as Michael O'Laughlin
- 1980 City in Fear as Kenny Reiger
- 1981 Circle of Power as Jack Nilsson
- 1981 Dead & Buried as George Le Moyne / Freddie
- 1983 Who Will Love My Children? as Kenneth Handy
- 1983 Special Bulletin as Steven Levitt
- 1985 To Live and Die in L.A. as Max Waxman
- 1986 Spiker as Newton "Newt" Steinbech
- 1986 Invaders from Mars as Captain Curtis
- 1997 Jack Frost as Sheriff Sam Tiler
- 2000 Jack Frost 2: Revenge of the Mutant Killer Snowman as Sheriff Sam Tiler
- 2008 Garden Party as Davey Diamond (final film role)

=== Television ===
- 1987-1988 Dynasty as Jesse Atkinson
- 1993 Alex Haley's Queen as Union Officer
- 1994 The X-Files as Agent Jack Willis, Episode "Lazarus" (1994)
- 2007 Mad Men as Andrew Campbell, Episode: "New Amsterdam"
- 2008 Brothers & Sisters as Governor Michael Bryant, Episode "Compromises"
