= Michael Cooney (screenwriter) =

British screenwriter, playwright, and director

- Born: 1967 (age 58–59); London, England
- Occupations: Screenwriter; playwright; director
- Years active: 1995–present
- Spouse: Jessica Collins (m. 2016)
- Children: 3
- Parent: Ray Cooney (father)

Michael Cooney (born 1967) is a British screenwriter, playwright, and director. Cooney also has written children's literature and young adult fiction. His most notable films are Identity (2003), The I Inside (2004) and Shelter (2010). His father is the actor and playwright Ray Cooney.

== Personal life ==
Cooney and the actress Jessica Collins married on May 4, 2016. He has one daughter with her, born in 2016, and two children from a previous marriage. He lives in Los Angeles.

== Filmography ==
Year	Title	Writer	Director	Exec. Prod.	Notes	Ref.
1995	Tracks of a Killer	Yes	No	No		
1997	Jack Frost	Yes	Yes	No		
1997	Murder in Mind	Yes	No	No	Based on Cooney's play The Dark Side.	
2000	Jack Frost 2: Revenge of the Mutant Killer Snowman	Yes	Yes	No		
2003	Identity	Yes	No	No		
2004	The I Inside	Yes	No	No	Timothy Scott Bogart shares a screenwriting credit. Based on Cooney's play Point of Death.	
2010	Shelter	Yes	No	No	Also known as 6 Souls	
2015	Runner	Yes	No	Yes	Unaired television pilot.	
2016	Spark	Yes	No	Yes	Unaired television pilot.	
2018	For Love	Yes	No	Yes	Unaired television pilot.	

== Plays ==
- Cooney, Michael (1997). Cash on Delivery!: A Comedy. New York: Samuel French. ISBN 978-0-573-01752-0.
- Cooney, Ray; Cooney, Michael (2006). Tom, Dick and Harry: A Comedy. New York: Samuel French. ISBN 978-0-573-11438-0.
