= Jeff Burr =

American film director (1961–2023)

- Born: July 18, 1961; Aurora, Ohio, U.S.
- Died: October 10, 2023 (aged 62); Dalton, Georgia, U.S.
- Occupations: Film director; writer; producer
- Years active: 1982–2023

Jeffrey Cameron Burr (July 18, 1961 – October 10, 2023) was an American film director, writer, and producer known for his work in horror sequels, such as Stepfather II, The Texas Chainsaw Massacre III, Puppet Master 4 and 5, and Pumpkinhead II.

== Early life and education ==
Jeff Burr was born in Aurora, Ohio, on July 18, 1961. He grew up in rural Dalton, Georgia, where he avidly read horror fanzines like Castle of Frankenstein, The Monster Times, and Famous Monsters of Filmland, and eventually began making his own Super-8 films.

Burr attended the University of Southern California (USC) (with R. A. Mihailoff who played Leatherface in Leatherface: The Texas Chainsaw Massacre III). He and fellow director Kevin Meyer dropped out of USC after his third year to finish their American Civil War drama Divided We Fall, which premiered in 1982 and won some acclaim at festivals around the world. Though Divided We Fall was a drama, Burr would spend most of his subsequent film career working in the Horror genre.

== Career ==
For his second feature film, alternately titled From a Whisper to a Scream or The Offspring, Burr approached veteran horror actor Vincent Price. Burr recalled in 2012,

So, the producer and I got his address from a celebrity address service, and we went up to his door with the script and a bottle of wine in hand (Price was a noted wine connoisseur). We came bearing gifts, and wouldn't you know… he opened the door himself when we knocked! It was a flurry of "Gee, Mr. Price, we're fans of your work…" and "we wrote this script," and he actually invited us inside. He had every reason to ignore us, and even if it was on a polite level, he could have said, "Okay boys, contact my agent," but he was just so gracious. He invited us in, sat and talked with us for about 15 minutes, took the script, and that's how it all started.

After From a Whisper to a Scream premiered in 1987, Burr directed his first studio film, a sequel to the 1987 horror/thriller The Stepfather, entitled Stepfather II. The film was poorly received, and Burr balked at studio executives Bob and Harvey Weinstein's post-production re-shoots with another director. Still, Burr was subsequently contacted by New Line Cinema with an offer to direct the second sequel to Tobe Hooper's 1974 classic The Texas Chain Saw Massacre after the studio's first choices—including directors Jonathan Betuel and Peter Jackson—dropped out. Burr was hired only two weeks before shooting began, and consequently had little time to prepare and little creative control over the final product. The resulting film, 1990's Leatherface: The Texas Chainsaw Massacre III encountered problems with the MPAA, requiring 11 different submissions before receiving an R Rating, which New Line required in order to effectively distribute the film. After test audiences responded positively to Ken Foree's character, the studio brought editor Michael Knue in to shoot a new ending which focused on the character. Burr, frustrated by the changes, asked that his name be removed from the final film, but was denied on the basis that film prints had already been struck which listed him as director.

Leatherface: The Texas Chainsaw Massacre III was not well received by critics, but nevertheless went on to gross $5,765,562 on a $2,000,000 budget, making the studio a profit.

Burr would go on to direct sequels to Pumpkinhead and Puppet Master, among many others. Though most of his subsequent work has been in the horror genre (Night of the Scarecrow, Devil's Den), Burr has also worked in dramedy (Eddie Presley), Science-Fiction (Spoiler, The Boy with the X-Ray Eyes) and war films (Straight into Darkness).

Throughout his career, Burr has expressed frustration over studio interference, budget limitations, and other unfortunate circumstances, leading him to claim in an interview in 2012 that there were only three films which he considered to be his own: From a Whisper to a Scream, 1992's Eddie Presley, and 2004's Straight into Darkness. The others, he claimed, had, "decisions that were made, in my estimation, that weren't the best. So, those are the three I stand behind without a mountain of qualifications."

== Death ==
Jeff Burr died of an apparent stroke at his home in Dalton, Georgia, on October 10, 2023. He was 62.

== Filmography ==
- Divided We Fall (1982)
- From a Whisper to a Scream (1987)
- Stepfather II (1989)
- The Texas Chainsaw Massacre III (1990)
- Eddie Presley (1992)
- Puppet Master 4 (1993)
- Puppet Master 5 (1994)
- Pumpkinhead II: Blood Wings (1994)
- Night of the Scarecrow (1995)
- American Hero (shot in 1995, released in 2021)
- Johnny Mysto: Boy Wizard (1997)
- The Werewolf Reborn! (1998)
- Spoiler (1998)
- The Boy with the X-Ray Eyes (1999)
- Phantom Town (1999)
- Straight Into Darkness (2004)
- Frankenstein & the Werewolf Reborn! (2005)
- Devil's Den (2006)
- Mil Mascaras vs. the Aztec Mummy (2007)
- The Telling (2009) (uncredited)
- Luger of the Black Sun (2009)
- Resurrection (2010)
- Alien Tornado (2012)
- Puppet Master: Blitzkrieg Massacre (2018)
