= The I Inside =

- Theatrical poster
- Directed by: Roland Suso Richter
- Written by: Michael Cooney; Timothy Scott Bogart
- Starring: Ryan Phillippe; Sarah Polley; Piper Perabo; Stephen Rea; Robert Sean Leonard
- Cinematography: Martin Langer
- Edited by: Chris Blunden; Jonathan Rudd
- Music by: Nicholas Pike
- Production companies: MDP Worldwide; Dimension Films; VIP Medeinfonds 1
- Distributed by: Miramax Films (United States, Canada, Australia and New Zealand); MDP Worldwide (Overseas)
- Release date: March 21, 2004 (TV premiere)
- Running time: 90 minutes
- Countries: United Kingdom; United States
- Language: English
- Budget: $8.8 million

The I Inside is a 2004 psychological thriller directed by Roland Suso Richter. It was written by Michael Cooney based on his own play Point of Death. This film has no connection with the science-fiction novel The I Inside, by Alan Dean Foster.

== Plot ==
Simon Cable wakes up in a hospital in 2002 with no memory of the past two years. Dr. Newman informs him that he briefly died and is suffering from memory loss. Simon believes it is the year 2000 and does not recognize his wife, Anna. A distressed woman named Clair visits him, but when he follows her, the hospital staff insists no one was there. Dr. Newman tries to help Simon piece together his past. He learns that his brother, Peter, died before he met Anna, contradicting his belief that Peter was still alive when he last saw him.

An orderly takes him for an MRI, where Simon is injected with an unknown substance by an intruder. He wakes up in 2000 instead, where a different doctor, Dr. Truman, tells him he was admitted due to a car accident and that he has no wife. In this timeline, he meets a patient named Traffid and recognizes Nurse Clayton, who he had previously seen in his "dream" of 2002. He also discovers that Clair was originally engaged to Peter and that he is suspected of involvement in Peter’s death. Anna, who is a nurse at the hospital in this timeline, plays a recording of Peter accusing Simon of killing him, and she attempts to blackmail him into marrying her.

Simon returns to 2002, where he explains what he saw to Dr. Newman who says Simon is having hallucination as a result of an anti-anxiety medication. While Dr. Truman no longer works at the hospital, Traffid is on the fifth floor awaiting surgery and remembers Simon from two years ago. Later he returns to 2000 and thinks he sees the same intruder from the MRI room and later stabs him. However, when the lights come on, he realizes he has actually stabbed Traffid. He runs away and returns to 2002 where Traffid is unharmed; however, suddenly the stab injuries appear and kill him. Simon has a flashback and remembers pushing Peter out of a window during a fight, then trying to dispose of the body by rolling it off a cliff. However, he was caught in the act and forced to flee. Determined to change the past, he returns to the night in his family home when he confessed his love to Clair. This time, he chooses to walk away from her out of loyalty to Peter. Clair runs after Peter as he leaves, but Simon still accidentally pushes him out the window during their confrontation. Instead of trying to cover it up, Simon takes Peter to the hospital.

While driving, Simon is tailgated by another car, and Peter briefly regains consciousness, distracting him. Simon loses control and crashes into a car, killing Clair that was returning to speak to him. EMTs arrive, including a woman who resembles Anna. Simon, severely injured, hears familiar words from an EMT before blacking out. He finds himself in his family home where Peter is present. Simon hears Dr.Newman tell him he must let go. However, Simon refuses desperate for another chance. The next scene is Simon dying on a hospital bed, time resets, and he wakes up as he did at the start of the movie, in 2002.

== Cast ==
- Ryan Phillippe as Simon Cable
- Sarah Polley as Clair
- Piper Perabo as Anna
- Stephen Rea as Dr. Newman
- Robert Sean Leonard as Peter Cable
- Stephen Lang as Mr. Travitt
- Peter Egan as Dr. Truman
- Stephen Graham as Travis
- Rakie Ayola as Nurse Clayton

== Production ==
The film is the English-language debut of German director Roland Suso Richter, whose previous credits include The Tunnel, After the Truth, and 14 Days to Life. Richter commented on the script by saying, "I was excited when I first read the script and if I can give something like that to the audience, that would be great." The film was initially announced in 2001 with Stephen Dorff, Jennifer Love Hewitt and Christian Slater in talks to star. Production began on June 5, 2002 in Wales on a budget of about $10 million, and wrapped in mid-July 2002. For the backdrop, the production crew used Sully Hospital, near Penarth, Cardiff in south Wales. Ryan Phillippe commented on filming in Wales, which was his first trip to the country, "The people are great and I have found some world-class restaurants, which is nice when you are get off from filming and want to go somewhere to relax."

Analyzing the criminal psyche is a common motif in Cooney's films and plays, and The I Inside is no exception. Though he himself is a stranger to real-life criminal trauma, Cooney explains that, "It's true that (criminal) psychology is a recurring theme of all my plays — those that aren't comedies, anyway. And while I don't have any background in it, I maintain that it's because I had such a happy childhood. It allowed me to explore the darker side of things, because I knew I would never get lost there."

== Reception ==
The film has generally received negative reviews from online critics. It holds a 33% rating on Rotten Tomatoes. Review sites have commended the film for a rather involving first two-thirds, with the mystery slowly being revealed layer by layer, drawing in the viewer. However, some critics found the ending a let down, calling it a "gotcha" gimmick that causes "the past 70 or so minutes (to go) out the window". Currentfilm.com gives the most positive review of the film, bestowing a rating of 3 1/2 out of 4 stars and describing the film as "an absolutely terrific thriller, and a really great surprise". The review acknowledges that there are "some minor story flaws and plot holes" but adds "that's not totally unexpected in a totally twisty film like this". Christopher Null of Filmcritic.com brings up a strange but interesting point: "The movie is based on a play with a much different title, one that actually gives away the surprise ending."

The I Inside has been compared with such films as Memento, The Butterfly Effect, eXistenZ, and Jacob's Ladder in several critical reviews. These films all feature similar story elements that tend to blur the distinctions between fantasy and reality.
