= Lazarus (The X-Files) =

- The X-Files episode
- Episode no.: Season 1 Episode 15
- Directed by: David Nutter
- Written by: Alex Gansa; Howard Gordon
- Production code: 1X14
- Original air date: February 4, 1994
- Running time: 45 minutes

Guest appearances
- Christopher Allport as Agent Jack Willis; Cec Verrell as Lula Phillips; Jackson Davies as Agent Bruskin; Callum Keith Rennie as Tommy Phillips; Jason Schombing as Warren Dupre

Episode chronology
← Previous "Gender Bender"	Next → "Young at Heart"
- The X-Files season 1

"Lazarus" is the fifteenth episode of the first season of the American science fiction television series The X-Files, premiering on the Fox network on February 4, 1994. It was written by Howard Gordon and Alex Gansa, directed by David Nutter, and featured guest appearances by Cec Verrell and Christopher Allport. The episode is a "Monster-of-the-Week" story, unconnected to the series' wider mythology. "Lazarus" earned a Nielsen household rating of 7.6, being watched by 7.2 million households in its initial broadcast; and received mixed reviews from critics.

The show centers on FBI agents Fox Mulder (David Duchovny) and Dana Scully (Gillian Anderson) who work on cases linked to the paranormal, called X-Files. After an old partner of Scully's is wounded in a bank robbery, Scully and Mulder come to believe that the injured man has been possessed by the spirit of the dead bank robber.

In the episode's original plot, the bank robber was to have jumped into Mulder's body. There was, however, a belief at the time that neither Scully nor Mulder should directly experience such phenomena. After Fox and the studio argued against the idea of using Mulder in such a way, the producers agreed to make the change. The opening robbery scene was filmed on location in Vancouver, where the acting by Jason Schombing, who played the robber, led some bystanders who apparently didn’t see the cameras to believe that the robbery was real.

== Plot ==
Dana Scully assists a fellow FBI agent, Jack Willis, in pursuing violent bank robbers Warren Dupre and Lula Phillips. Following an anonymous tip, the two agents corner Dupre during an attempted robbery. Dupre shoots Willis with a shotgun but is himself shot by Scully. Dupre dies, but Willis is eventually revived; however, Dupre's corpse is seen reacting to the jolts from the defibrillators used on Willis.

Willis wakes up a few days later, but now has a more sinister personality. He finds Dupre's body and cuts off his fingers to retrieve a wedding ring before fleeing the hospital. Scully explains to Fox Mulder that Willis has been obsessed with the Dupre-Phillips case for the past year, and admits to dating Willis while he was her instructor at the FBI Academy.

It is discovered that left-handed shears were used to cut off Dupre's fingers, despite the fact that Willis is right-handed, leading Mulder to believe that Willis' body is inhabited by Dupre's consciousness. The agents visit a University of Maryland medical professor who theorizes that during near-death experiences, an energy release can occur that could radically change someone's personality. He points out that those who have had such experiences often are unable to wear watches, as due to the level of energy running through their body the watches cannot function.

Willis, who finds Dupre's tattoo appearing on his arm, confronts Lula's brother Tommy and kills him, believing that he sold him out to the FBI and caused his "death". When Mulder and Scully investigate the next day, Willis arrives. He passes the tests that Scully gives him, but when Mulder asks him to sign a fake birthday card for Scully—whose birthday is months away and on the same day as Willis—he signs it. Scully is skeptical of Mulder's claims that Dupre is in Willis's body, believing that he is under stress due to his near-death experience.

When a landlord calls the FBI to tip them off about Phillips' location, Scully and Willis move in to capture her. However, when Scully corners Phillips, Willis holds Scully at gunpoint and forces her to instead handcuff herself. Scully is taken to Phillips' house, where she is beaten and handcuffed to a radiator. Willis then successfully convinces Phillips that he is actually Dupre. Willis calls Mulder to tell him that he and Phillips are holding Scully hostage, leaving Mulder frustrated and angry.

After seeing Willis/Dupre consume a large quantity of soda, Scully reveals that Willis is a diabetic and will require insulin to survive. Phillips and Willis/Dupre rob a pharmacy to obtain the necessary insulin. However, Phillips refuses to let Willis/Dupre use it, revealing that it was she who betrayed him, having fled the scene during the botched bank robbery. She calls Mulder, demanding a $1 million ransom for Scully. Audio of a nearby plane allows Mulder and his task force to track their general location, and a disguised cop going door to door spots Phillips.

Willis/Dupre feigns death, and when Phillips drops her wedding ring on him, he grabs her gun and kills her. He dies seconds later due to the lack of insulin. Mulder, who has just arrived on the scene, releases Scully. Later Scully retrieves Willis' possessions from the morgue, including a watch she gave him for his thirty-fifth birthday. The watch stopped at 6:47, the moment Willis died after the bank shooting.

== Production ==
"Pacing was the key for [Lazarus]. It was the opposite of 'Beyond the Sea'. I thought a lot of movement had to happen. The camera was moving, the actors were moving, all of which was designed to move the script along. It wasn't one of the more involved scripts. Just a pretty basic, straightforward story."

— "Lazarus" director David Nutter.

In the episode's original plot, Dupre was to have jumped into Mulder's body. There was, however, a belief at the time that neither Scully nor Mulder should directly experience such phenomena; the Fox network and the studio argued against the idea of using Mulder in such a way. With more than a little reluctance, the producers agreed to make the change. As writer Howard Gordon later recalled, "We'd wanted Mulder to experience the soul switch". Eventually, however, Fox's stance was changed; most notably, in the two-part sixth season episode, "Dreamland", when Mulder's consciousness is exchanged with government agent Morris Fletcher. Gordon ultimately came to believe that the final decision was almost certainly for the best and saw the benefit of introducing Scully's former boyfriend as it provided a welcome opportunity to delve into her history.

The opening bank robbery scene was filmed on location in Vancouver, where Jason Schombing's acting led some bystanders to believe that the robbery was real. Interior shots set in Dupre's basement were filmed in an asbestos-lined apartment building, where a translator was required to interface with the mostly-Asian tenants. This episode features the first of several occasions in which Scully is abducted. Her birthday, February 23, is revealed in this episode; though the year of her birth, 1964, would not be established until the second season episode "One Breath".

== Reception ==
"Lazarus" premiered on the Fox network on February 4, 1994. The episode earned a Nielsen household rating of 7.6, with a 12 share and was viewed by 7.2 million households, meaning that roughly 7.2 percent of all television-equipped households, and 12 percent of households watching television, were tuned in to the episode.

Series creator Chris Carter was very pleased with the episode, stating that it was "a very good and well-acted episode. I like it because it actually seemed too real to me. It played less as a paranormal science fiction show than as whether or not something could really happen. The entire cast was wonderful. Overall that was a terrific episode". In a retrospective of the first season in Entertainment Weekly, "Lazarus" was rated a C+, being described as "as exciting as Scully's taste in men (not very)". The episode's supporting cast, however, was described as "solid". Zack Handlen, writing for The A.V. Club, rated the episode a B−, finding that it had "no real thematic resonance". He found that the episode left its premise "largely unexplored", and would have benefited from a stronger focus on the relationship between the characters of Willis and Dupre. Matt Haigh, writing for Den of Geek, reviewed the episode negatively, feeling that it "wasn't up to much", and that it "plays more like an episode of Diagnosis Murder than anything else". However, the exploration of Scully's character history was cited as a positive aspect of the episode. Anna Johns, writing for TV Squad, was critical of "Lazarus", stating that its opening scene was "the only good part" of the episode.

== Footnotes ==
=== References ===
- Edwards, Ted (1996). X-Files Confidential. Little, Brown and Company. ISBN 0-316-21808-1.
- Gradnitzer, Louisa; Pittson, Todd (1999). X Marks the Spot: On Location with The X-Files. Arsenal Pulp Press. ISBN 1-55152-066-4.
- Lovece, Frank (1996). The X-Files Declassified. Citadel Press. ISBN 0-8065-1745-X.
- Lowry, Brian (1995). The Truth is Out There: The Official Guide to the X-Files. Harper Prism. ISBN 0-06-105330-9.
