= Vanessa Marshall =

American voice actress

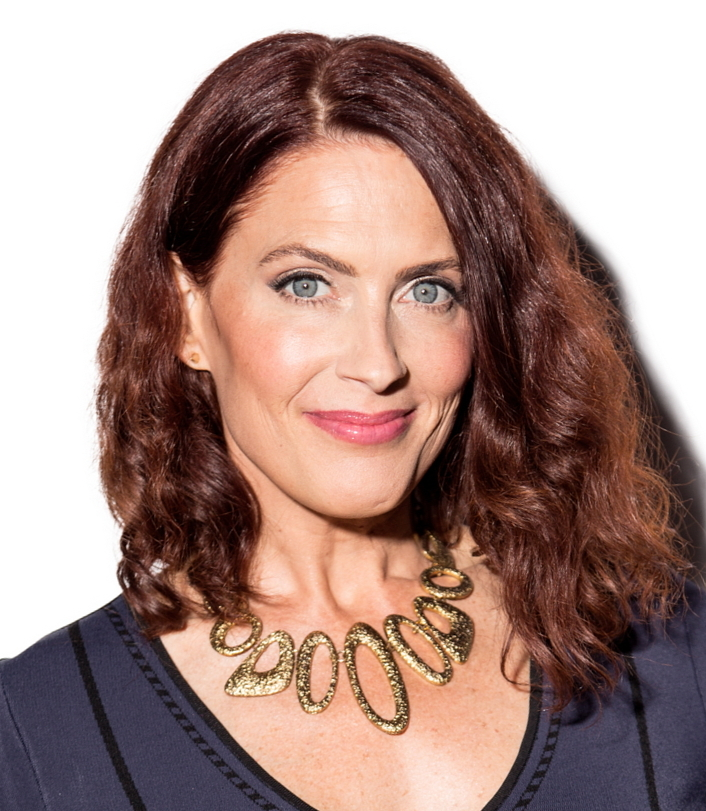
- Marshall in 2016
- Education: Princeton University (BA); New York University (MFA)
- Occupation: Actress
- Years active: 1994–present
- Spouse: Andrew Kishino (m. 2001; div. 2007)
- Parent: Joan Van Ark
- Website: vanessamarshall.com

Vanessa Marshall is an American voice actress who is most active in films, cartoons and video games.

== Career ==
Prior to her career as a voice actor, Marshall attended Princeton University, majoring in English. She then attended graduate school at the New York University Tisch School of the Arts, attaining a masters in acting and learning different dialects, which Marshall credits for helping her in her voiceover career. She started voice acting after being discovered by a voice acting agent during a solo performance, where she was playing 15 different characters. One of her best known roles is her voice acting for the character Hera Syndulla in Star Wars Rebels. She reprised the role in Star Wars: The Bad Batch.

In July 2021, Marshall described Hera as a "strong, iconic female character", said that she brought together all the elements in her life into her voice acting as Hera, and argued that Hera became inspirational for her. Previously, she stated, in an April 2016 interview, that she brought her "convictions and...open heart" to each session in which she recorded as Hera, including her study of martial arts, and said the original Star Wars film in 1977 had a " huge impact" on her. In another interview, in March 2016, said she "secretly dedicated" her performance as Hera to her father, who is a pilot, noted her use of French language skills in the show, and joked that Sabine Wren was her "favorite character" in Rebels.

== Personal life ==
Marshall is the daughter of actor and voice actor Joan Van Ark and journalist John Marshall. She was born and raised in Los Angeles and continues to live in Los Angeles.

Marshall was married to fellow voice actor Andrew Kishino from 2001 to 2007. During their marriage, they founded Marsh-Kish Productions, a voice-over production company; she decided to keep the company name as the two remained friends after their divorce. Both have appeared as main characters in the animated television series The Spectacular Spider-Man. Her acting in this has been compared to that of her mother in the 1970s Spider-Woman series.

== Filmography ==
=== Voice acting ===
==== Animation ====
| Year | Title | Role(s) | Notes | Ref. |
|---|---|---|---|---|
| 1999 | Cow and Chicken | Beautician, Store Assistant, Store Attendant | Episode: "Mall Cop" | |
| 1999 | The Brothers Flub | Additional voices | | |
| 2001 | Johnny Bravo | Trucker, Airport Announcer | Episode: "A Johnny Bravo Christmas" | |
| 2001–2007 | Grim & Evil / The Grim Adventures of Billy & Mandy | Irwin, various voices | | |
| 2002 | Time Squad | Cleopatra | Episode: "Shop Like an Egyptian" | |
| 2002 | The Zeta Project | Virtual Operator | Episode: "Wired" | |
| 2002 | Justice League | Lipstick Lady | Episode: "Fury" | |
| 2003–2005 | Duck Dodgers | Vanity Automaton, The New Cadet, Waitress, Women, Dandy Boy Blue | 3 episodes | |
| 2004 | The Powerpuff Girls | Gal, Teller | Episode: "Mo' Linguish/Oops, I Did It Again" | |
| 2005 | What's New, Scooby-Doo? | Danica LeBlake | Episode: "Ready to Scare" | |
| 2005 | W.I.T.C.H. | Eleanor Brown | | |
| 2006 | Ben 10 | Tini, Diamondhead (Gwen), Cannonbolt (Gwen), Four Arms (Gwen), Policewoman | 3 episodes | |
| 2008–2009 | The Spectacular Spider-Man | Mary Jane Watson, Rosie Thompson | | |
| 2009 | Wolverine and the X-Men | Vertigo | Episode: "eXcessive Force" | |
| 2010 | Black Panther | Dora Milaje, Madame, Female Cannibal | Miniseries | |
| 2010 | Batman: The Brave and the Bold | Poison Ivy, Katrina Moldoff / Batwoman | 2 episodes | |
| 2010–2011 | Sym-Bionic Titan | Tiffany, Kristin, Xeexi, Girl | | |
| 2010–2012 | The Avengers: Earth's Mightiest Heroes | Black Widow, Madame Hydra, Anaconda, Waitress, S.H.I.E.L.D. Computer, A.I.M. Computer, Hydra Computer, Civilian Woman | | |
| 2010–2013 | Fish Hooks | Mouse, Shiloh, Female Crowd Member | | |
| 2011–2013, 2019–2022 | Young Justice | Black Canary, Red Inferno, Amanda Spence, Noor Harjavti, Ursa / Emerald Empress, Ida Berkowitz, Illona DeLamb-Markov, Soranik Natu | 19 episodes | |
| 2012 | Green Lantern: The Animated Series | Galia | 2 episodes | |
| 2013 | Ben 10: Omniverse | Drew Saturday | Episode: "T.G.I.S." | |
| 2014 | Breadwinners | Intercom Lady | Episode: "Thug Loaf/Mine All Mine" | |
| 2014–2018 | Star Wars Rebels | Hera Syndulla | | |
| 2014–2018 | Avengers Assemble | Medusa, Meagan McLaren, Hela | | |
| 2015–2017 | Regular Show | Toothpick Sally, Jessica, Penny, Jolene, Martyka, various voices | | |
| 2015–2017 | Pig Goat Banana Cricket | Mary Louise Pizzagut, Melba, Brad, Brady, JR Kyle, various voices | | |
| 2015–2019 | Guardians of the Galaxy | Gamora, Meredith Quill, Crystal, various voices | | |
| 2016 | Archer | Actress | Episode: "Bel Panto: Part 1" | |
| 2016–17 | Uncle Grandpa | Additional voices | | |
| 2016–2020 | Ben 10 | Queen Bee | 5 episodes | |
| 2017 | Bravest Warriors | Josephine Kirkman, Conductor | Episode: "Dan of Future Past" | |
| 2017 | The Loud House | Tina, Waitress | Episode: "Back Out There/Spell It Out" | |
| 2017 | Be Cool, Scooby-Doo! | Ms. Blackwhite, Tiny Tim, Mom | | |
| 2017 | Lego Star Wars: The Freemaker Adventures | Hera Syndulla, Dial Tone | | |
| 2017 | Lego Marvel Super Heroes - Guardians of the Galaxy: The Thanos Threat | Gamora | | |
| 2017–2018 | Stretch Armstrong and the Flex Fighters | Madame Tousant | | |
| 2017–2018 | Star Wars Forces of Destiny | Hera Syndulla, Vendor | | |
| 2017–2018 | The Powerpuff Girls | Additional voices | | |
| 2018 | Rise of the Teenage Mutant Ninja Turtles | Additional voices | Various | |
| 2018 | Lego Star Wars: All-Stars | Hera Syndulla, Customer | | |
| 2019 | Victor and Valentino | Lechuza | Episode: "The Boy Who Cried Lechuza" | |
| 2019–2021 | Final Space | Invictus, Helper Hula (2nd time) | | |
| 2019–present | Harley Quinn | Joey, Wonder Woman, Giganta, Reporter, Teller | | |
| 2020 | Star Wars: The Clone Wars | Rook Kast | 2 episodes | |
| 2020–present | Rick and Morty | Additional voices | | |
| 2020–2025 | Blood of Zeus | Ariana's Sister, Hestia, Alecto | 7 episodes | |
| 2021 | Star Wars: The Bad Batch | Hera Syndulla | 2 episodes | |
| 2022 | Tales of the Jedi | Village Elder | Episode: "Justice" | |
| 2023 | Scissor Seven | Normal Assassin | | |
| 2024–2025 | Tomb Raider: The Legend of Lara Croft | Rescued Children, Possessed Henchwoman, Additional Voices | 6 episodes | |
| 2024 | Lego Marvel Avengers: Mission Demolition | Invisible Woman, Computer | Disney+ Television Special | |
| 2026 | Star Wars: Maul – Shadow Lord | Rook Kast | | |

==== Films ====
| Year | Title | Role | Notes |
|---|---|---|---|
| 2000 | Supernova | Sweetie | |
| 2005 | The Golden Blaze | Honohan, Pharmacist Mom, Cindy, TV News Anchor, Goon Boy #1 | Direct-to-video |
| 2006 | Dr. Dolittle 3 | White Hen, Tan Hen | Direct-to-video |
| 2007 | Billy & Mandy's Big Boogey Adventure | Irwin, Pirate | Television film |
| 2007 | Wrath of the Spider Queen | Irwin | Television film |
| 2007 | Ben 10: Secret of the Omnitrix | Myaxx, Salesperson | Television film |
| 2008 | Justice League: The New Frontier | Mala | Direct-to-video; Credited as Amazon Woman |
| 2008 | Underfist: Halloween Bash | Irwin | Television film |
| 2009 | Garfield's Pet Force | Vetvix | Direct-to-video |
| 2010 | Dante's Inferno: An Animated Epic | Lust Minion #2, Frozen Prisoner | Direct-to-video |
| 2010 | Justice League: Crisis on Two Earths | Wonder Woman | Direct-to-video |
| 2011 | Snowflake, the White Gorilla | Female Newscaster | English dub Direct-to-video |
| 2012 | Strange Frame | Chandra Childs | Uncredited |
| 2013 | Justice League: The Flashpoint Paradox | Wonder Woman | Direct-to-video |
| 2016 | Batman: Bad Blood | Renee Montoya | Direct-to-video |
| 2016 | Rogue One | Additional voices | |
| 2016 | Lego DC Comics Super Heroes: Justice League – Gotham City Breakout | Poison Ivy | Direct-to-video |
| 2018 | Lego DC Comics Super Heroes: The Flash | Poison Ivy | Direct-to-video |
| 2018 | Teen Titans Go! To the Movies | Vault Voice | |
| 2020 | Superman: Red Son | Wonder Woman | Direct-to-video |
| 2022 | Earwig and the Witch | Bella Yaga | English dub |
| 2025 | The King of Kings | Mary of Bethany | |

==== Video games ====
| Year | Title | Roles | Notes |
|---|---|---|---|
| 1998 | Dune 2000 | Narrator | |
| 2000 | The Lion King: Simba's Mighty Adventure | Nala | |
| 2001 | Metal Gear Solid 2: Sons of Liberty | Olga Gurlukovich | |
| 2002 | James Bond 007: Nightfire | Car Computer | |
| 2002 | Star Wars Jedi Knight II: Jedi Outcast | Jan Ors | |
| 2002 | Metroid Prime | Samus Aran | Death scream |
| 2002 | Emperor: Battle for Dune | Filmbook, Unit Response Voice | |
| 2003 | Dino Crisis 3 | Sonya | |
| 2003 | Freedom Fighters | Additional voices | |
| 2003 | True Crime: Streets of LA | Additional voices | |
| 2003 | James Bond 007: Everything or Nothing | Computer | |
| 2003 | SOCOM II U.S. Navy SEALs | HQ | |
| 2004 | Fallout: Brotherhood of Steel | Wasteland Prostitute, Raider Matron | |
| 2004 | Wrath Unleashed | Aenna | |
| 2004 | Onimusha 3: Demon Siege | Vega Donna | |
| 2004 | Painkiller | Catherine, Eve | |
| 2004 | Shrek 2 | Wicked Witch, Cinderella, Grandma | |
| 2004 | Forgotten Realms: Demon Stone | Zhai, Female Elf #1, Elven Villager | |
| 2004 | Shark Tale | Additional Tenant Fish | |
| 2004 | EverQuest II | Various | |
| 2004 | Viewtiful Joe 2 | Rachel | |
| 2004 | Painkiller: Battle Out of Hell | Eve | |
| 2004 | Star Wars: Knights of the Old Republic II: The Sith Lords | Master Lonna Vash, Terlyn, Iziz Citizen, Mercenary, Settler, Telosian, TSF Lieutenant | |
| 2005 | Shadow of Rome | Ancanas | |
| 2005 | Guild Wars | Additional Voices | |
| 2005 | Advent Rising | Olivia Morgan | |
| 2005 | The Incredible Hulk: Ultimate Destruction | Mercy | |
| 2005 | Ultimate Spider-Man | Female Pedestrian | Uncredited |
| 2005 | Viewtiful Joe: Red Hot Rumble | Sprocket, Rachel, Tsukumo | |
| 2005 | Crash Tag Team Racing | Adult Female | |
| 2005 | Gun | Homesteader's Wife | |
| 2005 | True Crime: New York City | | |
| 2005 | Need for Speed: Most Wanted | Secondary Officer #5 | |
| 2005 | Kingdom Hearts II | Nala | |
| 2006 | Dead Rising | Additional Voices | |
| 2006 | Saints Row | Stilwater's Residents | |
| 2006 | The Grim Adventures of Billy & Mandy | Irwin | |
| 2006 | The Legend of Spyro: A New Beginning | Sparx's Mother | |
| 2006 | Justice League Heroes | Huntress | |
| 2006 | Agatha Christie: Murder on the Orient Express | Antoinette Marceau | |
| 2006 | Metal Gear Solid: Portable Ops | Eva | |
| 2007 | Spider-Man 3 | Jean DeWolfe | |
| 2007 | Pirates of the Caribbean: At World's End | Wenches, Townsfolk | |
| 2007 | Conan | Additional Voices | |
| 2007 | Mass Effect | Saphyria, Businesswoman | Uncredited |
| 2007 | Universe at War: Earth Assault | Masari Figment, Female Civilian #3 | |
| 2007 | No More Heroes | Naomi | |
| 2008 | Lego Batman: The Videogame | Poison Ivy, Catwoman | |
| 2008 | Too Human | Female Civilian #1 | |
| 2008 | Madagascar: Escape 2 Africa | Additional Voices | |
| 2009 | Prototype | Karen Parker | |
| 2009 | Bionic Commando | Emily Spencer | |
| 2009 | Ghostbusters: The Video Game | Additional Voices | |
| 2009 | Ratchet & Clank Future: A Crack in Time | Dr. Nefarious Computer Voice | |
| 2010 | Mass Effect 2 | Ereba, Nef, Colonist, Citadel Advertisement Asari, Tennekont Advertisement | |
| 2010 | Metal Gear Solid: Peace Walker | Strangelove | |
| 2010 | Shrek Forever After | Witches | |
| 2011 | Ratchet & Clank: All 4 One | Pepper Fairbanks | |
| 2011 | Star Wars: The Old Republic | Master Bela Kiwiiks, Alauni, Chaney Barrow, Daizanna, Ensign Rosha, Kayla Perlis, Komi, Master Injay, Master Sumalee, Voss Pilgrim, Yana-Ton | |
| 2012 | Armored Core V | Regan Stratford, AC Pilot | |
| 2012 | Mass Effect 3 | Officer Jordan Noles, Captain Lee Riley, Ereba, Additional Voices | |
| 2012 | Diablo III | Additional Voices | Also Reaper of Souls |
| 2012 | Guild Wars 2 | Additional Voices | |
| 2012 | Doom 3: BFG Edition | Computer, Bernice F. Tooley, Additional Voices | |
| 2013 | Young Justice: Legacy | Black Canary, Killer Frost | |
| 2013 | Lightning Returns: Final Fantasy XIII | Additional Voices | |
| 2014 | The Lego Movie Videogame | Additional Voices | |
| 2015 | Infinite Crisis | Wonder Woman | |
| 2015 | Heroes of the Storm | Kerrigan | |
| 2015 | Metal Gear Solid V: The Phantom Pain | Strangelove | |
| 2016 | Hitman | Supporting Cast, Trailer Narrator | |
| 2017 | Injustice 2 | Black Canary | |
| 2017 | Marvel vs. Capcom: Infinite | Gamora | |
| 2018 | Marvel Powers United VR | Crystal, Gamora, Madame Hydra | |
| 2018 | Lego DC Super-Villains | Black Canary, Grail | |
| 2019 | Mortal Kombat 11 | Sheeva | |
| 2019 | Marvel Ultimate Alliance 3: The Black Order | Gamora | |
| 2020 | Final Fantasy VII Remake | Additional Voices | |
| 2020 | Star Wars: Squadrons | Hera Syndulla | |
| 2020 | Star Wars: Tales from the Galaxy's Edge | Master Sylwin | |
| 2021 | Star Wars: Tales from the Galaxy's Edge- Last Call | Master Sylwin | |
| 2022 | Marvel's Midnight Suns | Sara / Caretaker | |
| 2023 | Justice League: Cosmic Chaos | Wonder Woman, Blue Snowman, Grace | |
| 2023 | Mortal Kombat: Onslaught | Sonya Blade, Sheeva | |

=== Audio books ===
| Year | Title | Role |
|---|---|---|
| 2015 | Rain of the Ghosts | Judith Vendeval |

=== Live-action ===
List of acting performances in film and television
| Year | Title | Role | Notes |
|---|---|---|---|
| 1994 | Law & Order | Veronica | Episode: "Blue Bamboo" |
| 1999 | City Guys | Assistant | Episode: "Movin' on Up" |
| 2000 | Jack Frost 2: Revenge of the Mutant Killer Snowman | Bloody Girl | Direct-to-video |
| 2001 | Scrubs | Becky | Episode: "My Best Friend's Mistake" |
| 2007 | The Bold and the Beautiful | Dispatcher | 1 episode |
| 2017 | Jane the Virgin | Latina Lover Narrator | Episode: "Chapter Sixty-Five" |

| Preceded by Keri Russell (2009) | Voice of Wonder Woman; 2010–2011 | Succeeded by Michelle Monaghan |
