= Chattanooga High School Center for Creative Arts =

Public magnet school in Tennessee, US

Center for Creative Arts
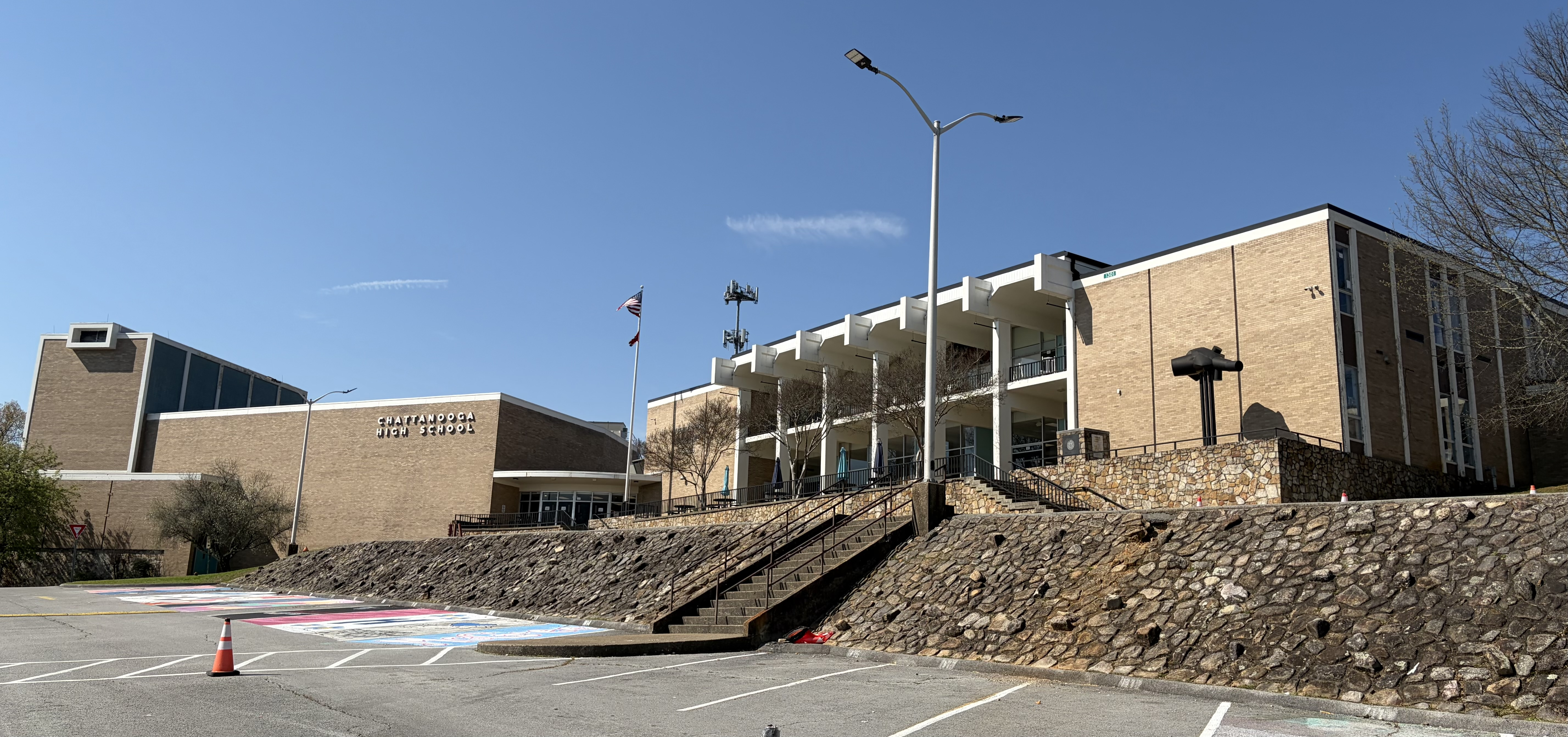
- Chattanooga High School Center for Creative Arts in 2026

Location
- 1301 Dallas Rd; Chattanooga, Tennessee; United States; 35.0793°N 85.3042°W

Information
- Type: Public secondary fine arts magnet
- Motto: "Every day at CCA, a star is rising."
- Established: 1874
- Principal: Jill Levine
- Teaching staff: 40.00 (FTE)
- Grades: 6–12
- Enrollment: 649 (2022-2023)
- Student to teacher ratio: 16.23
- Song: "Here's to the Dreamers" - Allan A. Ledford
- Website: cca.hcde.org

The Chattanooga High School Center for Creative Arts is a fine arts magnet school for grades six through twelve, located in Chattanooga, Tennessee, United States and founded in 1874. Its seventh and final location, built in 1963, is now the Center for Creative Arts (CCA).

Students major in one of the eight creative arts taught: Communications, Dance, Instrumental Music, Musical Theatre, Technical Theatre, Theatre, Visual Arts, or Vocal Music.

== Events ==
In 2004, work by student artists from the school went on exhibit in the Mayor’s Office conference room for several months. This Art in Public Places program was sponsored and coordinated by Allied Arts of Greater Chattanooga.

In 2005, 25 students from CCA visited Gangneung, South Korea, to perform at the Fourth Annual International Junior Arts Festival. Over 500 students ages 12 to 20, from Russia, Germany, Mongolia, Japan, the U.S. and Korea took part in the event.

In 2007, the dance department of the school hosted the Tennessee Association of Dance's (TAD) annual statewide conference.

Ongoing events include the annual Jazz Benefit at the Bessie Smith Hall, with performances by students and faculty. The annual Chattanooga Dances! Concert is presented in the Center for Creative Arts Auditorium. The program highlights the city’s non-profit dance companies along with schools that maintain a full-time dance department. The Center for Creative Arts Theatre Department performs in the school’s Sandra Black Theatre.

== The Choo Choo "Kids" ==
The Choo Choo "Kids" are a musical theatre troupe consisting of 10–15 CCA students led by Michael Howard. Every year, they perform in a fall showcase, and a spring musical. In the summer of 2009, the "Kids" performed in Hamm, Germany. The Choo Choo "Kids" were founded by longtime and now retired educator Allan Ledford.

== Project Motion ==
Project Motion is a division of the Dance major at CCA. Each year, students majoring in dance at CCA audition for a select number of spots.

== Awards ==
In 2006, the school was awarded the 2005–2006 Creative Ticket Award by the Kennedy Center.

In 2007, Karen Wilson, Dance Department Chair at the Center for Creative Arts, received the Tennessee Association of Dance Outstanding Dance Educator Award.

== Admission ==
The academic year features an A/B block schedule with year-long classes meeting on alternate days. Upper-level students have the option to take joint enrollment classes at UTC or on campus through Chattanooga State.

== Notable alumni ==
- Fredrick Davis, ballet dancer
