= Straight into Darkness =

- Home video cover
- Directed by: Jeff Burr
- Written by: Jeff Burr
- Produced by: Mark Hannah; Chuck Williams
- Starring: Ryan Francis; Scott MacDonald; Linda Thorson
- Cinematography: Viorel Sergovici
- Edited by: Lawrence A. Maddox
- Music by: Michael Convertino
- Production companies: Chuck Williams Productions; Silver Bullet
- Distributed by: Screen Media Ventures
- Release date: 2004
- Running time: 95 minutes
- Country: United States
- Language: English

Straight into Darkness is a 2004 American horror war film directed by Jeff Burr and starring Ryan Francis and Scott MacDonald. It was produced by Mark Hanna and Chuck Williams.

== Plot ==
Two American World War II soldiers, both about to be court martialed for cowardice near the end of the war, escape when the Military Police Jeep they are riding in hits a land mine. They flee over the presumably French or Belgian countryside when they run into a band of partisans consisting of children led by an adult couple. The partisans, believing the Americans are German impostors, initially take the soldiers prisoner. The partisans are later forced to trust the Americans when they are about to be attacked by a strong force of German soldiers who they falsely believe are after them. The Americans agree to help the partisans fight the Germans if they are released. The German commanders press the attack; however, they have ulterior motives for the attack and are not pursuing the partisans after all.

== Cast ==
- Ryan Francis as Losey
- Scott MacDonald as Demming
- Linda Thorson as Maria
- James LeGros as Soldier
- Daniel Roebuck as Soldier
- David Warner as Deacon
- Liliana Perepelicinic as Anna
- Gabriel Spahiu as The Lunatic Priest
- Nelu Dinu as Nelu
- Mihai Verbițchi as Buchler (as Mihai Verbintshi)
- Ion Bechet as Sergeant

== Release ==
=== Home media ===
The film was released on DVD by Screen Media Films and Bleiberg on June 6 and November 13, 2006 respectively. In 2010, it was released twice by Screen Media, once again, as both a single-feature, and multi-feature movie pack. It was released for the first time on Blu-ray by Willette Acquisition Corp. on December 8, 2015.

== Reception ==
Scott Weinberg from eFilmCritic gave the film 4/4 stars, writing, "Jeff Burr's Straight Into Darkness starts out like a straight war flick, almost turns into a horror movie, slowly becomes a moving piece of drama, and spits you out on the other side both impressed with the end product...and more than a little shaken." Robert Koehler of Variety wrote, "Jeff Burr’s neo-gothic WWII drama Straight Into Darkness ends up resisting categorization. There’s pleasure to be had in watching a period war pic made with a personal touch and with a self-conscious pedigree, but this diminishes as Burr excessively lays on themes and action." Ian Jane from DVD Talk gave the film 3/5 stars, writing, "Straight Into Darkness is an interesting and at times almost surreal war film that does a good job of mixing horror movie elements with some serious drama. Unfortunately it gets a little buried under its own message but that doesn't mean it isn't worthwhile." Jon Condit from Dread Central awarded the film a score of 2.5 out of 5, calling it "fundamentally flawed", but commended the film's visuals.
