= Marsha Clark =

American actress

- Occupation: Television actress

Marsha Clark is an American actress, best known for her roles in soap operas, including the second Hillary Bauer on Guiding Light, the third Tina Lord on One Life to Live and Judge Karen Fitzpatrick on Days of Our Lives. Clark voiced the spirit of Grace Bennett on Passions.

She has also guest starred on many prime-time series, such as Trapper John, M.D., Criminal Minds, Dynasty, Desperate Housewives, Rules of Engagement and Malcolm in the Middle and provided voice work for several cartoons for film, video games and TV such as Rugrats, Aaahh!!! Real Monsters, Tom & Jerry Kids, Cloudy with a Chance of Meatballs, The Mask: Animated Series, The Brothers Flub, Ponyo, EverQuest II, As Told by Ginger, A.N.T. Farm, X-Men Legends II: Rise of Apocalypse, A Flintstones Christmas Carol, The Kids from Room 402, Sam & Max Hit the Road, A Letter to Momo, Droopy, Master Detective, The What a Cartoon! Show and Problem Child.
