= Celebrity Rap Superstar =

- Created by: Giuliana Rancic
- Presented by: Kevin Hart; Liz Hernandez
- Judges: DMC; Da Brat; Big Boy
- Composer: Dylan R. Berry
- Country of origin: United States
- No. of episodes: 8

Production
- Executive producer: Giuliana Rancic

Original release
- Network: MTV
- Release: August 30 – October 18, 2007

Celebrity Rap Superstar is an American reality show which premiered on MTV on August 30, 2007. The series was hosted by Kevin Hart and Liz Hernandez.

== Overview ==
The series features eight rappers teaching eight celebrities to be able to perform rap songs, which in turn were voted on by the viewers.

The judges had the power in various weeks to choose one or more celebrities to be safe from voting and move forward to the following week's round. The celebrity with the lowest votes from the viewers would be eliminated from the competition. The judges panel consisted of DMC, Da Brat and Big Boy. The hosts were comic Kevin Hart and radio personality Liz Hernandez.

The series was broadcast live on some Thursdays, 10:00 PM Eastern and tape-delayed on others until some controversies arose during the competition that ultimately led to the remainder of the season being broadcast live.

== Challenges ==
- Week 1 : The celebrities performed a hit song they rehearsed.
- Week 2 : The celebrities performed a song of their choice.
- Week 3 : The celebrities performed a song they wrote.
- Week 4 : The celebrities are paired in twos and performed a song together.

The judges' least favorite pairing battled it out while performing Fabolous's "Can't Let You Go" featuring Lil Mo to determine who gets eliminated. Lil Mo guest starred to provide her vocals.

- Week 5 : The celebrities performed a song by their mentors with their mentors.
- Week 6 : The celebrities have to fast rap. Twista was the guest judge.
- Week 7 : The final 2 celebrities each perform 3 songs: A hip-hop anthem, a viewer's choice, and a final original song.
- Week 8 : Season Finale. The remaining two celebrities performed their favorite songs from the season. All the celebrities had a guest appearance in the show. Also all the mentors performed Sugarhill Gang's song "Rapper's Delight".

== Celebrities and songs performed ==
- Shar Jackson - Actress whose credits include the television shows Moesha and The Parkers, the films Good Burger and Love and Basketball, and her spot in the reality show The Ex-Wives Club following her breakup with Kevin Federline [Mentor: MC Lyte] Winner of the Competition.
  - Week 1: "Tambourine" by Eve
  - Week 2: "My Name Is" by Eminem
  - Week 3: "No Time For Hating" by Shar Jackson
  - Week 4: "It's Tricky" by Run-D.M.C. (Duet with Sebastian Bach)
  - Week 5: "Ruffneck" by MC Lyte (Duet with MC Lyte)
  - Week 6: "Overnight Celebrity" by Twista
  - Week 7, Song 1: "Get Ur Freak On" by Missy Elliott
  - Week 7, Song 2: "Bust A Move" by Young M.C. (Viewer's Choice)
  - Week 7, Song 3: "Let It Blow" by Shar Jackson
  - Week 8, Song 1: "It Takes Two" by Rob Base and DJ EZ Rock (Duet with Kendra)
  - Week 8, Song 2: "Whatta Man" by Salt-N-Pepa featuring En Vogue (with Kendra, Perez, and Countess)
  - Week 8, Song 3: "Get Ur Freak On" by Missy Elliott
  - Week 8, Song 4: "Good Life" by Kanye West
- Kendra Wilkinson - One of the stars of E! reality series The Girls Next Door and one of Hugh Hefner's three girlfriends [Mentor: Too Short]
  - Week 1: "Candy" by Foxy Brown featuring Kelis
  - Week 2: "Me, Myself and I" by De La Soul
  - Week 3: "Hold Up, Pimps Down" by Kendra Wilkinson
  - Week 4: "Push It" by Salt-N-Pepa (duet with Perez Hilton)
  - Week 5 : "Blow The Whistle" by Too Short (duet with Too Short)
  - Week 6: "What's Your Fantasy" by Ludacris
  - Week 7, Song 1: "Hot in Herre" by Nelly
  - Week 7, Song 2: "Baby Got Back" by Sir Mix-A-Lot (Viewer's Choice)
  - Week 7, Song 3: "Epiphany" by Kendra Wilkinson
  - Week 8, Song 1: "It Takes Two" (duet with Shar)
  - Week 8, Song 2: "What a Man" by Salt-N-Pepa (with Shar, Perez, and Countess)
  - Week 8, Song 3: Blow the Whistle" by Too Short
- Sebastian Bach - Former lead singer of Skid Row [Mentor: Kurupt]
  - Week 1: "Mama Said Knock You Out" by LL Cool J
  - Week 2: "California Love" by Dr. Dre featuring Tupac Shakur
  - Week 3: "One for the Money" by Sebastian Bach
  - Week 4: "It's Tricky" by Run-D.M.C (Duet with Shar Jackson)
  - Week 5: "A Doggy Dogg World" (Duet with Kurupt)
  - Week 6: "Bombs Over Baghdad" by Outkast
  - Week 7: Eliminated by viewer votes But Still Performed his Viewers Choice "Fight for Your Right" by Beastie Boys
  - Week 8: "Slam" by Onyx
- Perez Hilton - Celebrity gossip blogger known for his signature doodles on paparazzi photos [Mentor: Tone Loc]
  - Week 1: "Right Thurr" by Chingy
  - Week 2: "Jesus Walks" by Kanye West
  - Week 3: "I'm The Queen" by Perez Hilton
  - Week 4: "Push It" by Salt-N-Pepa (Duet with Kendra Wilkinson)
  - Week 5: "Funky Cold Medina" by Tone Loc (Duet with Tone Loc)
  - Week 6: "Still Not a Player" by Big Pun -- Eliminated by judges vote
  - Week 8: "What A Man" by Salt-N-Pepa (with Kendra, Shar, and Countess)
- Countess Vaughn - Star Search '88 junior vocalist champion turned actress whose credits include the television shows Moesha and The Parkers [Mentor: Warren G]
  - Week 1: "Lip Gloss" by Lil' Mama
  - Week 2: "This Is Why I'm Hot" by MIMS
  - Week 3: "It's Just Me" by Countess Vaughn
  - Week 4, Song 1: "Nuthin' but a "G" Thang" by Dr. Dre and Snoop Doggy Dogg (Duet with Jason Wahler)
  - Week 4, Song 2: "Can't Let You Go" by Fabulous featuring Lil' Mo
    - (Rap Battle challenge between herself and Jason Wahler; was declared the winner and advanced to next round by judge's decision)
  - Week 5 : "Regulate" By Warren G and Nate Dogg
    - (This went un-performed as a duet. Countess Vaughn got sick and was instructed by a doctor that she could not perform for 2 weeks. Additionally, she did not appear in studio for the show's airing. Due to her illness, she was eliminated. Warren G performed the song at the end.)
  - Week 8, "What A Man" by Salt-N-Pepa (with Kendra, Shar, And Perez)
- Jason Wahler - Reality TV star known for his roles in Laguna Beach: The Real Orange County and The Hills [Mentor: Bubba Sparxxx]
  - Week 1: "Ridin'" by Chamillionaire
  - Week 2: "Going Back to Cali" by LL Cool J
  - Week 3: "Baller (I'm Jason Wahler)" by Jason Wahler
  - Week 4, Song 1: "Nuthin' but a "G" Thang" by Dr. Dre and Snoop Doggy Dogg (Duet with Countess Vaughn)
  - Week 4, Song 2: "Can't Let You Go" by Fabulous featuring Lil' Mo
    - (Rap Battle challenge between himself and Countess Vaughn; eliminated by judge's decision)
  - Week 8, "Shake A Tailfether" by Nelly (With Jamal Anderson, and Efren Ramirez)
- Efren Ramirez - Actor best known for his role as Pedro Sanchez in the 2004 film Napoleon Dynamite [Mentor: Bizarre]
  - Week 1: "In Da Club" by 50 Cent
  - Week 2: "Insane in the Brain" by Cypress Hill
  - Week 3: "It's not EFR-ren, It's EE-fren " by Efren Ramirez -- Eliminated by Rap Battle
  - Week 8, "Shake Ya Tailfeather" by Nelly (with Jamal Anderson, and Jason Wahler)
- Jamal Anderson - Former NFL Atlanta Falcons Running Back [Mentor: Redman]
  - Week 1: "Big Things Poppin'" by T.I.
  - Week 2: Eliminated by viewer vote
  - Week 8, "Shake Ya Tailfeather" by Nelly (With Efren Ramirez, and Jason Wahler)

== Order of elimination ==
The elimination results for the week are given during the next show. For example, The elimination results for Week 1's show was revealed during Week 2's show.

To avoid confusion: The results revealed for that week's performance is recorded below as is.

During week 4, the votes were tallied and each contestant was ranked. The ranking had no effect on the outcome of elimination but was used to pair the contestants off (1st with 6th, 2nd with 5th, and 3rd with 4th).

Week:	Episode 1	Episode 2	Episode 3	Episode 4	Episode 5	Episode 6	Episode 7	Episode 8
Celebrities	Results							
Shar Jackson	—	Safe	Safe	3rd Place	3rd Place	1st Place	Safe	WINNER
Kendra Wilkinson	—	Safe	Safe	1st Place	1st Place	2nd Place	Safe	Runner-Up
Sebastian Bach	—	Safe	Bottom 2	4th Place	4th Place	3rd Place	Eliminated	
Perez Hilton	—	Safe	Safe	6th Place	5th Place	Eliminated		
Countess Vaughn	—	Safe	Safe	5th Place	2nd Place			
Jason Wahler	—	Safe	Safe	Eliminated				
Efren Ramirez	—	Bottom 2	Eliminated					
Jamal Anderson	—	Eliminated						

Legend

Gender: Male Female

The celebrity was the winner of the competition

The celebrity was safe by the viewers choice
The celebrity was selected safe by the judges

The celebrity was in the bottom 2 and voted safe by the judges

The celebrity was eliminated due to illness
The celebrity was eliminated

The celebrity was safe by default

== Awards ==
The title sequence created by Framework Studio won a 2009 Telly Award.
