= Playing with Fire (Kevin Federline album) =

Studio album by Kevin Federline
- Released: October 31, 2006
- Recorded: 2005–2006
- Genre: Hip hop
- Length: 49:36
- Labels: Federline Records; Reincarnate Music
- Producers: Bosko; Christopher Notes Olsen; Fingers & Twirp; J. R. Rotem; Versatyle (producer; Young Classic

Playing with Fire is the only studio album by American dancer and rapper Kevin Federline, released on October 31, 2006, through Federline Records. The album's executive producer was Federline's then-wife Britney Spears, who also contributed vocals to "Crazy". She and Federline composed two tracks that did not get included in the album. Contributions to the album's production came from a variety of producers and songwriters, including DJ Bosko Stix Baby, J. R. Rotem, and Versatyle. Reception to Playing with Fire by music critics was overwhelmingly negative, and it is currently the lowest-rated album on review aggregator Metacritic.

The planned lead single, "PopoZão", was produced by Disco D in a style influenced by Brazilian funk carioca and cowritten by Spears. Released in January 2006, the single was panned by critics and removed from the album in response. "Lose Control" was provided a download-only release in October 2006 and premiered with a performance at the 2006 Teen Choice Awards. Playing with Fire debuted at number 151 on the Billboard 200, with sales of 6,000 copies, and has sold over 16,000 copies in the United States according to Nielsen Soundscan.

== Development ==
"I feel like in my life, in the last couple of years, with everything that's gone on, that's how I feel—like I'm playing with fire. [It could also mean] things I say on there are playing with fire, the press is toying with me, so they're playing with fire—it goes all different ways."

— Federline speaking to Entertainment Weekly about the album title.

In July 2004, singer Britney Spears became engaged to Federline, whom she had met three months before. The romance received intense attention from the media, since Federline had recently broken up with actress Shar Jackson, who was still pregnant with their second child at the time. Federline felt the public and press saw him as someone who was "in Spears' shadow" and only wanted to benefit from the relationship. In order to be seen as a legitimate recording artist himself, Federline decided to work on a hip hop album. Spears financed the project, wanting her husband to feel supported. Federline then worked with several producers including Christopher Notes Olsen and J.R. Rotem. Spears also composed two tracks with Federline titled "Y'all Ain't Ready" and "PopoZão"; however, neither was ultimately included on the album. Federline described the album as "like an upbeat club record. Everything on it, you can just pretty much dance to it. It says a lot, in a fun way. It speaks for itself."

== Release and promotion ==
=== Singles and release ===
The first single option was "PopoZão". According to Chuck Arnold of People, "the frenetic dance track (its title refers to a bootylicious posterior) taps into the favela funk sound popular in Rio de Janeiro and features production by Disco D, who keeps things popping with breakneck beats." The song was ultimately omitted from Playing with Fire in response to negative critical reception.

The album's download-only single, "Lose Control", was premiered with a performance at the 2006 Teen Choice Awards. On September 27, 2006, it was announced that "Crazy", featuring Spears, would be included on the album instead of "PopoZão", and that "Lose Control" had been chosen as the lead single instead. Along with the announcement, it was revealed that the first 500 fans who pre-ordered Playing With Fire via Federline's online store would receive an autographed photo. All pre-orderers were also entered into a contest to attend a record release party in Los Angeles hosted by Spears. Playing with Fire was released on October 31, 2006, through Federline Records. One week after the release, Spears filed for divorce from Federline, listing irreconcilable differences.

=== Tour ===
In early October 2006, Federline commenced the Playing with Fire Tour at Webster Hall in New York City; out of a total seating capacity of 1,500, he performed to an estimated audience of 300, of which two-thirds left before the end of the show. On October 8, 2006, many of the tickets for the show at House of Blues in Chicago were given away for free. Following the poor reception, the remaining dates were ultimately cancelled.

== Reception ==
=== Critical response ===
Professional ratings
Aggregate scores
Source	Rating
Metacritic	15/100
Review scores
Source	Rating
AllMusic	1/5 stars
Entertainment Weekly	F
IGN	2.9/10
Now	1/5 stars
People	2/5 stars
RapReviews	4.5/10
Rolling Stone	1/5 stars
Slant Magazine	1/5 stars
Vibe	1/5 stars

Playing with Fire was panned by critics. The album holds a score of 15 out of 100 (indicating "overwhelming dislike") based on 7 critical reviews, according to the music review aggregator Metacritic. It is the lowest-rated album on the site, with its score being half of that of the second-lowest rated album, The Bloodhound Gang's Hefty Fine. A Billboard reviewer was critical about the production and Federline's rap, stating that, "in general, Federline enunciates well." A critic from Now commented that "his flow is generic and instantly forgettable and his lyrics are trite, inconsequential and full of self-importance", while Chris Willman of Entertainment Weekly gave the album an F, stating that the concept of it is "about squandering Britney Spears' fortune." AllMusic's Stephen Thomas Erlewine gave it one star of five, calling it "too serious about being taken seriously to get unintentionally silly"; he wrote that rather than breaking any new ground in the genre Federline mostly emulated Snoop Dogg, wrote about repetitive topics concerning his fame, drugs, and parties, and relied on cliché beats while being outshined by the album's guest appearances. Jimmy Newlin of Slant Magazine criticized the album's producers for "half-hearted beats, annoying musical tics, and enough bass to make your speakers beg for mercy", and deemed the album "just as disposable and dumb as you'd expect." In a rare positive review, Ron Harris of Associated Press called Playing with Fire "a credible, entertaining debut", praising the tracks "Privilege", "Kept on Talkin'" and "Crazy".

=== Chart performance ===
Playing with Fire sold 6,000 copies in its first week, debuting at number 151 on the Billboard 200. As of January 22, 2007, the album has sold over 16,000 units in the United States, according to Nielsen SoundScan.

== Track listing ==
Playing with Fire track listing
No.	Title	Writer(s)	Producer(s)	Length
1.	"Intro"	Federline; Versatyle Francisco Ruiz		0:57
2.	"The World Is Mine"	Christopher Notes Olsen; Kevin Federline; William Crawford	Notes	2:43
3.	"America's Most Hated"	J.R. Rotem; Federline; Crawford	J.R. Rotem	3:42
4.	"Snap"	Cecil Brooks IV; Federline; Crawford	Young Classic	3:54
5.	"Lose Control"	Rotem; Federline	J.R. Rotem	3:36
6.	"Dance with a Pimp" (featuring Ya Boy)	Rotem; Federline; Crawford	J.R. Rotem	3:50
7.	"Privilege" (featuring Bosko)	Federline; Bosko Kante	Bosko	3:59
8.	"Crazy" (featuring Britney Spears)	Kante; Federline; G Louriano; DJ Emz	Bosko	3:23
9.	"A League of My Own"	Federline; Francisco Ruiz	Federline; Versatyle Francisco Ruiz	3:35
10.	"Playing with Fire"	Federline; Fingers & Twirp	Fingers & Twirp	4:48
11.	"Interlude"			0:56
12.	"Caught Up"	Olsen; Federline; Crawford	Notes	3:47
13.	"Kept on Talkin'" (includes hidden track "Middle Finger")	Olsen; Federline; Crawford	Notes	10:36

== Charts ==
Chart performance for Playing with Fire
Chart (2006)	Peak position
US Billboard 200	151

== Bibliography ==
- Heard, Christopher (2010). Britney Spears: Menina perdida. Prumo Retratos. ISBN 978-85-7927-163-2.
