= Efren Ramirez =

American actor (born 1973)

Efren Ramírez
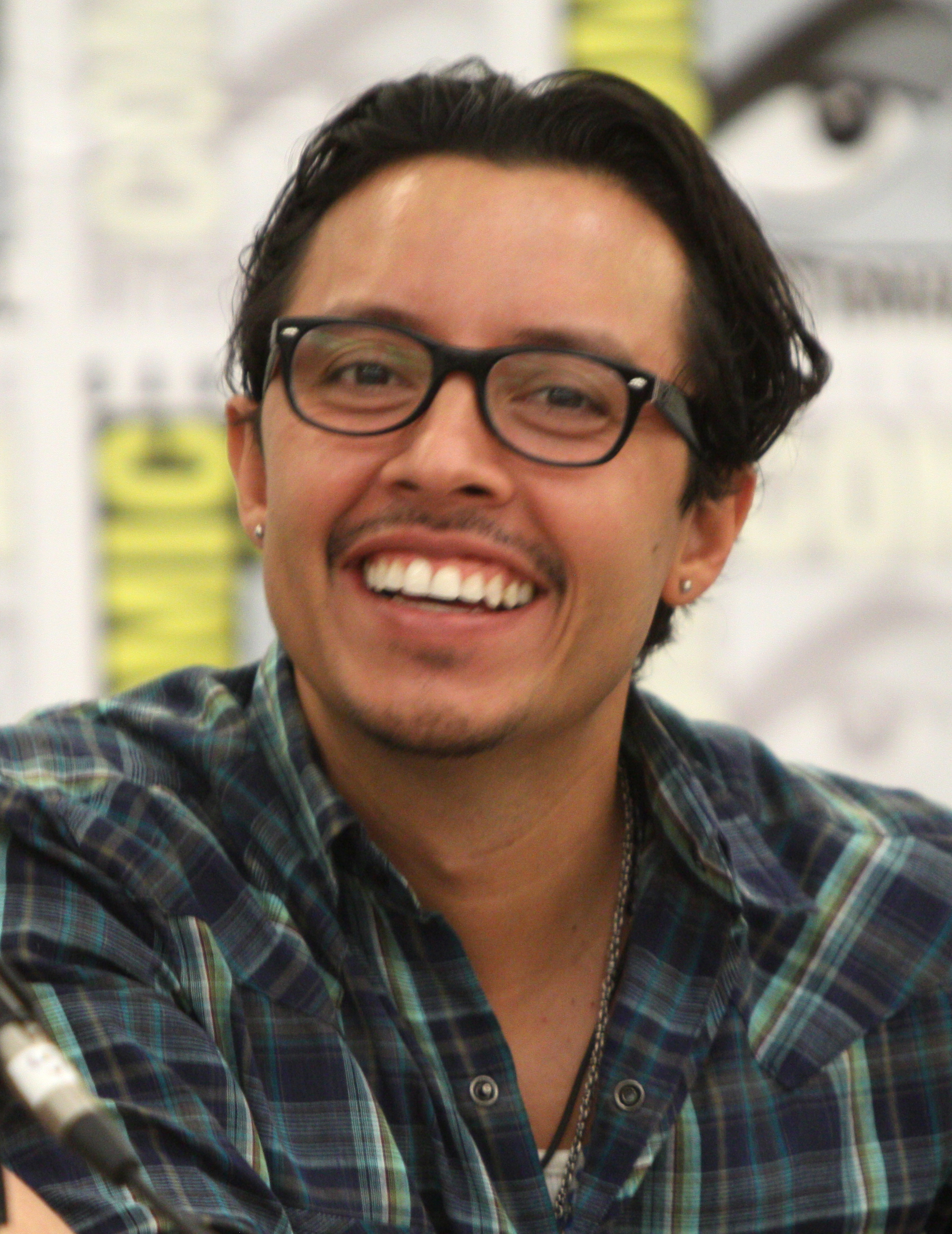
- Ramirez at the 2010 San Diego Comic-Con
- Born: Efren Antonio Ramírez; October 2, 1973 (age 53); Los Angeles, California, U.S.
- Occupation: Actor
- Years active: 1992–present
- Spouse: Iyari Limon (m. 1998; ann. 1999)

Efren Antonio Ramírez (born October 2, 1973) is an American actor. He is best known for playing Pedro Sánchez in the 2004 indie film Napoleon Dynamite. He later reprised his role in the 2012 animated series of the same name.

== Early life ==
Ramírez was born on October 2, 1973, in Los Angeles, California, to Salvadoran parents. He has four brothers, one of whom is his identical twin Carlos.

== Career ==
Ramirez has starred in a number of films, including Napoleon Dynamite as Pedro Sánchez, Employee of the Month, Crank and Crank: High Voltage, Searching for Mickey Fish, All You've Got, and Walkout and made cameos in Nacho Libre and Mr. & Mrs. Smith. In 2011, Efren starred in the comedy American Summer as well as appearing as a contestant on MTV's Celebrity Rap Superstar. On July 14, 2008 Sierra Mist released a series of commercials aimed at multicultural consumers in which Efren stars.

Soon after the success of Napoleon Dynamite, the music group G. Love and Special Sauce asked Efren to appear in their music video "Booty Call". He also played Ashlee Simpson's boyfriend in the music video for her 2005 song "Boyfriend". Ramírez made a cameo appearance in a 2005 episode of ABC's George López wearing a T-shirt similar to the shirt Jon Heder wears in Napoleon Dynamite that reads, "Vote For Pedro". In 2007 Ramírez appeared as the judge for an acting challenge on Cycle 8 of America's Next Top Model.

Ramírez made several cameos throughout his career. In King Cobra, he portrayed a teenager playing a game of hide-and-seek with his girlfriend (portrayed by Ramirez's wife Iyari Limon). They later end up as prey for the title antagonist. In the music video for Sleazy, Pedro appears as a cameo and lip syncs André 3000's verse.

He co-founded Powerhouse Pictures Entertainment, LLC with Chris Barrett, and they co-authored the book Direct Your Own Life: How To Be A Star in Any Field You Choose being published on June 10, 2008 through Kaplan Publishing.

== Personal life ==
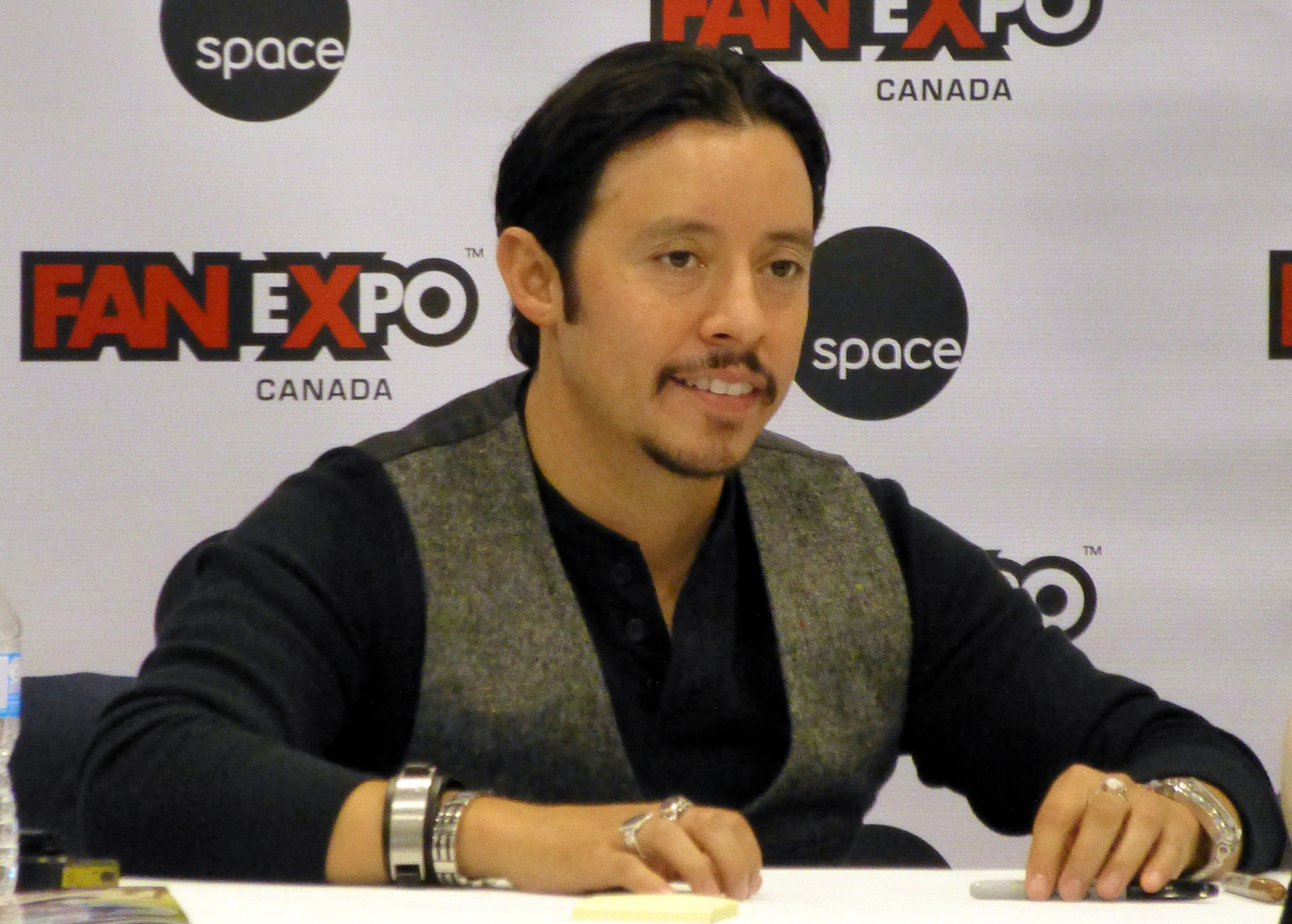
Efren Ramirez at a convention

In 1998, Ramírez married actress Iyari Limon. The marriage was annulled the following year. Ramirez is also a member of the Richmond Flying Mummies ownership group.

Ramírez is also a DJ, who has performed worldwide and toured in over 50 cities across 5 continents. His sets include a variety of music, from hip hop, funk, disco, to hard house. His production company "Nocturnal Rampage" throws a recurring rave event every summer in Austin, Texas.

== Filmography ==
=== Film ===
Year	Title	Role	Notes
1994	Tammy and the T-Rex	Pizza Boy	Film debut role
1995	Jury Duty	Pirate Pete's employee	
1996	Kazaam	Carlos	
1998	Melting Pot	Miguel Álvarez	
1999	King Cobra	Teen Boy	Direct-to-video
2000	Rave	Bookie	
2001	Delivering Milo	Street Hustler	Uncredited
2004	Napoleon Dynamite	Pedro Sánchez	
2004	Just Hustle	Street Connection	
2006	Tomorrow's Yesterday	Ron	Short film
2006	Gettin' Some Jail Time	Pico	Short film
2006	Crank	Kaylo	
2006	Employee of the Month	Jorge Mecico	
2006	Walkout	Bobby Verdugo	
2007	Moola	Hector	Independent film
2007	Crossing the Heart	Jesus	
2009	Ratko: The Dictator's Son	Ratko Volvic	Direct-to-video
2009	Gamer	DJ Twist	
2009	Crank: High Voltage	Venus/Kaylo	
2010	When in Rome	Juan	Uncredited
2011	The Pool Boys	Hector	
2012	Casa de mi padre	Esteban	
2014	School Dance	El Matador	
2015	Endgame	Mr. Alvarado	
2016	Varsity Punks	Coach Menlo	
2016	Middle School: The Worst Years of My Life	Gus	
2017	Trafficked	Enrique	
2017	Mad Families	Rolando	Crackle original movie
2022	Lightyear	Airman Díaz (voice)	
2022	Satanic Hispanics	The Traveler	
2023	Due Justice	Detective Santigo	
2024	Seven Cemeteries	Miguel	

=== Television ===
Year	Title	Role	Notes
1996	Relativity	Javier	Episode: "Fathers"
1997	Dangerous Minds	Nutty	Episode: "The Feminine Mystique"
1997	Nothing Sacred	Guillermo	Episode: "A Bloody Miracle"
1999	Ryan Caulfield: Year One	Juan	Episode: "Nocturnal Radius"
1999	Chicken Soup for the Soul	Paco	Episode: "Paco Come Home"
2000	Missing Pieces	Renaldo	Television film
2000-2001	Boston Public	Amaad Wilkens	2 episodes
2000-2001	Even Stevens	Scrub Patrol	2 episodes
2003	Judging Amy	Ricky Diaz	Episode: "Picture of Perfect"
2003	ER	Jimmy	Episode: "Death and Taxes"
2004	The District	Fernando Guttierez	Episode: "Ten Thirty-Three"
2005	George Lopez	The new class treasurer (parody of Pedro Sánchez)	Episode: "George's Extreme Makeover-Holmes Edition"
2005	Robot Chicken	Pedro Sanchez / Domino's Pizzaman (voice)	Episode: "The Black Cherry"
2006	Walkout	Bobby Verdugo	Television film
2006	All You've Got	Carlos	Television film
2006	Mad TV	Various roles	2 episodes
2007	El Tigre: The Adventures of Manny Rivera	El Cucharón (voice)	2 episodes
2007	American Dad!	Paco (voice)	Episode: "American Dream Factory"
2007	Celebrity Rap Superstar	Himself	Television special
2007	Scrubs	"Caramel Bear" Ricky	Episode: "My Growing Pains"
2010	Eastbound & Down	Catuey	7 episodes
2012	Napoleon Dynamite	Pedro Sánchez (voice)	6 episodes
2015	Constantine	Julio	Episode: "The Saint of Last Resorts: Part 2"
2016	Bordertown	Ruiz González (voice)	Episode: "Viva Coyote"
2016	Deadbeat	Morgue Ghost	Episode: "El Caboose"
2019	Perpetual Grace, LTD	Felipe Guillermo Usted	9 episodes
2021	The Casagrandes	Picosito (voice)	Episode: "Bend It Like Abuelo"
2022	Made for Love	Oz Wimmer	Episode: "Another Byron, Another Hazel"
2022	FBI: Most Wanted	Oscar Zamora	Episode: "Succession"
