= Angie Everhart =

American actress and model (born 1969)

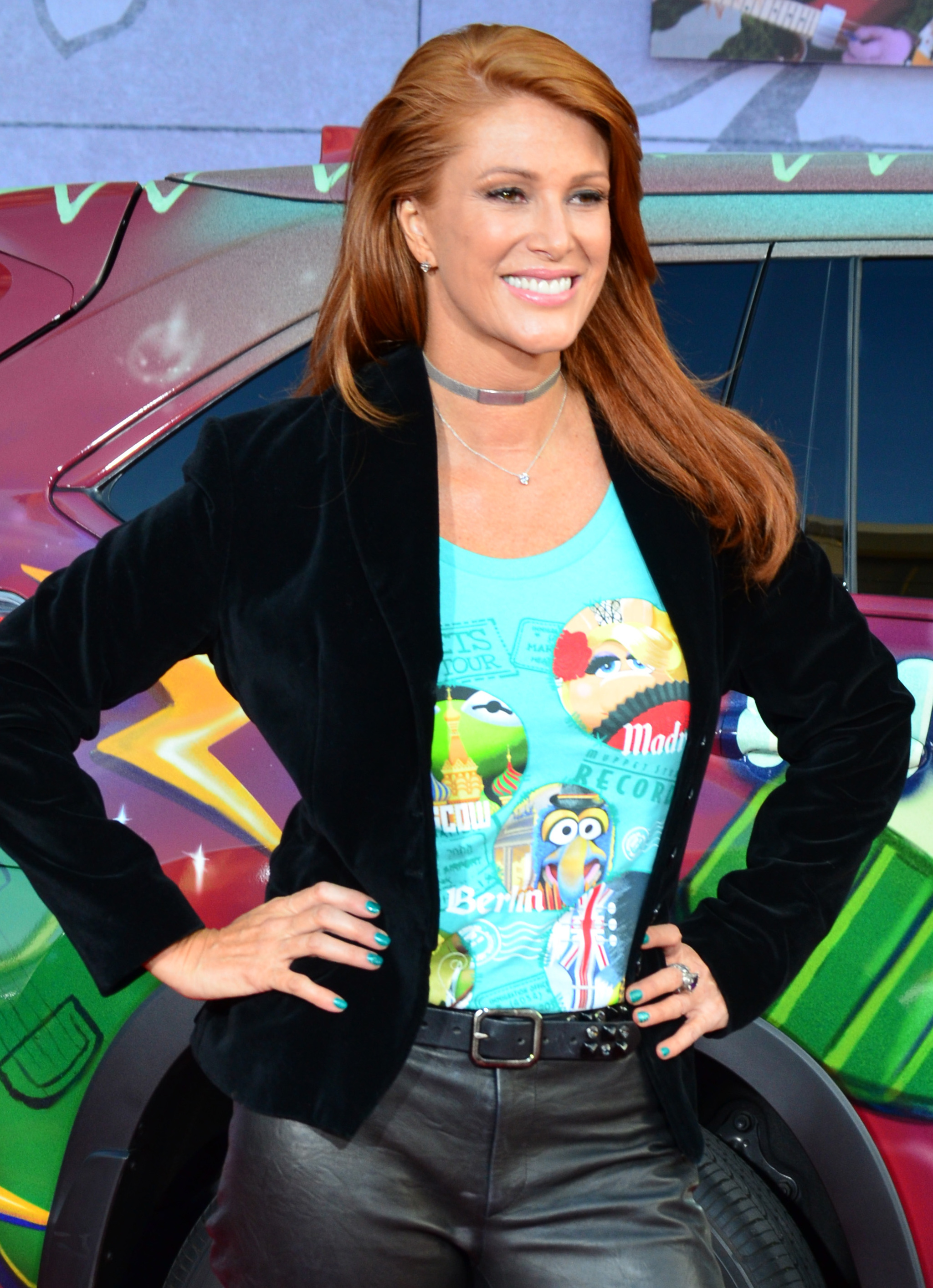
- Everhart in 2014
- Born: Angela Kay Everhart; September 7, 1969 (age 57); Akron, Ohio, U.S.
- Occupation: Actress
- Years active: 1993–present
- Spouse(s): Ashley Hamilton (m. 1996; div. 1997) Carl Ferro (m. 2014; div. 2018)
- Partner: Joe Pesci (2000–2008)
- Children: 1

Angela Kay Everhart (born September 7, 1969) is an American actress and former model who appeared in several Sports Illustrated Swimsuit Issues in the 1990s and posed nude for Playboy in 2000.

== Early life ==
Everhart was born on September 7, 1969, in Akron, Ohio, the daughter of homemaker Ginnie and engineer Bob Everhart.

== Career ==
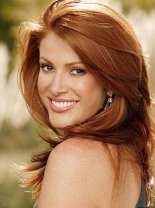
Angie Everhart

As a teenage girl, Everhart became a cover model for such fashion magazines as Elle and Glamour. Following a horseback riding accident in which she broke her back at the age of 19, Everhart eventually recovered through physical therapy. She appeared in several issues of the annual Sports Illustrated swimsuit edition, starting in 1995. Everhart posed nude for a cover-featured pictorial in the February 2000 issue of Playboy. She was ranked #98 on the FHM 100 Sexiest Women of 2003.

Everhart made her film debut in 1993 with the Arnold Schwarzenegger action-comedy Last Action Hero. She later appeared in Jade (1995), Tales From the Crypt Presents: Bordello of Blood (1996), Mad Dog Time (1996), Executive Target (1997), Another 9½ Weeks (1997), Denial (1998), Gunblast Vodka (2000), The Substitute: Failure Is Not an Option (2001), Sexual Predator (2001), Bare Witness (2001), Wicked Minds (2003), Payback (2006), Bigfoot (2008), and Take Me Home Tonight (2011).

She has also appeared on a few scripted and reality TV shows. In 2000, she played a lawyer in Law and Order: Special Victims Unit. In 2004, she appeared in Celebrity Mole: Yucatan, in which she was the "mole", the rogue agent sabotaging the group. She was one of the "Gingers" on the second season of The Real Gilligan's Island (the other was Erika Eleniak), but left the show when she accidentally cut her finger severely enough to sever tendons and require surgery. Everhart was also a panelist on To Tell The Truth from 2000 until 2001 and on Hollywood Squares from 2002 until 2004. Everhart was a co-host on the ABC reality show The Ex-Wives Club, along with Marla Maples, and Shar Jackson in 2007.

Everhart's long red hair earned her three Crown Awards for "Best Redhead" at the Super-Hair.Net website from 2005 to 2007. She also represented the United States in two Super-Hair World Cup tournaments, winning the championship through online votes in both 2006 and 2010.

On February 28, 2012, Everhart began co-hosting the weekly live podcast Hot N Heavy with The Greg Wilson on the Toad Hop Network. It is recorded at Jon Lovitz Comedy Club & Podcast Theatre.

== Personal life ==
Everhart was briefly engaged to Sylvester Stallone in 1995, but they did not marry. She was married to Ashley Hamilton from December 1, 1996, until their divorce in March 1997. She was engaged to Joe Pesci in July 2007, but the couple broke up in April, 2008.

Everhart gave birth to her son Kayden in July 2009 with her ex-boyfriend Chad Stansbury.

Everhart was diagnosed with thyroid cancer and had surgery on May 14, 2013. A representative of hers said, "[Angie] wants to set the record straight by letting everyone know that it is true that she has been diagnosed with thyroid cancer, however, the prognosis is very good." She filed for bankruptcy due to medical expenses from thyroid cancer treatment.

She married Carl Ferro, founder of meal delivery service Sunfare.com, in 2014. Everhart filed for divorce from Ferro in 2018, citing irreconcilable differences.

In October 2017, Everhart accused Harvey Weinstein of masturbating in front of her at the Venice Film Festival when they were staying on the same boat. She said she was sleeping and awoke to Weinstein standing over her bed. She said she tried to leave, but Weinstein blocked the door. Everhart said that Weinstein instructed her not to tell anyone, but she did anyway, yet no one would do anything since they were terrified of Weinstein.

Once a skydiving enthusiast, she gave up the activity following an accident in which she was injured badly enough to require back surgery.

Everhart is fluent in French.

== Filmography ==
=== Film ===
Year	Title	Role	Notes
1993	Last Action Hero	Video Babe	
1995	Jade	Patrice Jacinto	
1996	Bordello of Blood	Lilith	
1996	Mad Dog Time	Gabriella	
1997	Love in Paris	Lea Calot	
1997	Executive Target	Lacey	
1998	Denial	Candace	
1998	Welcome to Hollywood	Herself	
1998	Garden of Evil	Kelly	
1999	BitterSweet	Samantha 'Sam' Jensen	Video
1999	Running Red	Katherine	Video
1999	Dillinger in Paradise	-	Short
1999	D.R.E.A.M. Team	Kim Taylor	TV movie
2000	The Stray	Kate Grayson	
2000	Gunblast Vodka	Jane Woods	
2000	Point Doom	Jessica	
2000	Camera	Herself	
2001	The Substitute: Failure Is Not an Option	Dr. Jenny Chamberlain	Video
2001	Last Cry	Beth Spinella	Video
2001	Heart of Stone	Mary Sanders	
2002	Bare Witness	Carly Marsh	Video
2002	The Real Deal	Samantha Vassar	
2003	First to Die	Chessy Jenks	TV movie
2003	Wicked Minds	Lana	TV movie
2003	Bugs	Dr. Emily Foster	TV movie
2004	The Cradle Will Fall	Katie DeMaio	TV movie
2004	The Hollywood Mom's Mystery	Julia Prentice	TV movie
2004	Bandido	Natalie	
2006	Cloud 9	Julie	
2007	Payback	Samantha	
2007	The Unknown Trilogy	Donna Patulo	
2009	Bigfoot	Brooke Caldwell	
2011	Take Me Home Tonight	Trish Anderson	
2013	Blunt Movie	Supermodel	
2014	The Wedding Pact	Laura	
2017	Anathema	Camilla	
2018	Downward Twin	Rita	
2018	Woman on the Edge	Ms. Larson	
2024	Devil's Knight	Duchess de Baudicourt	
2025	Cash Collectors	Angela Lewis	

=== Television ===
Year	Title	Role	Notes
1994	The Mommies	Herself	Episode: "The Exercist"
1997	Wheel of Fortune	Herself/Celebrity Contestant	Episode: "Celebrity Week 4"
1997	Ink	Herself	Episode: "Face Off"
1998	3rd Rock from the Sun	Chloe	Episode: "36! 24! 36! Dick!: Part 1 & 2"
1998	Caroline in the City	Susan Wyman	Episode: "Caroline and the Little White Lies"
1999	The Dream Team	Kim Taylor	Main Cast
2000	Saturday Night Live	Herself	Episode: "Freddie Prinze, Jr./Macy Gray"
2000	To Tell the Truth	Herself/Panelist	Episode: "Movie Sexpert"
2000	Law & Order: Special Victims Unit	Emily Waterbury	Episode: "Disrobed"
2001-02	UC: Undercover	Carly	Recurring Cast
2003	Autograph	Herself	Episode: "Angie Everhart"
2003	NASCAR on NBC	Herself/Co-Grand Marshal	Episode: "Pepsi 400"
2004	The Mole	Herself	Main Cast: Season 4
2004	Hollywood Squares	Herself/Panelist	Recurring Panelist
2005	The Real Gilligan's Island	Herself	Main Cast: Season 2
2007	The Ex-Wives Club	Herself	Main Cast
2011	Celebrity Close Calls	Herself	Episode: "Episode #1.5"
2011	Happily Divorced	Claire	Episode: "Someone Wants Me"
2012	Keeping Up with the Kardashians	Herself	Episode: "Affairs of the Everhart"
2014	Celebrity Wife Swap	Herself	Episode: "Angie Everhart/Pat & Gina Neely"
2014	The Daily Helpline	Herself/Co-Host	Episode: "Angie Everhart"
2015	David Tutera's Celebrations	Herself	Episode: "Angie Everhart"
2016	The 411	Herself/Host	Main Host
2020	Famously Afraid	Herself	Episode: "Episode #1.10"

=== Music video ===
Year	Song	Artist	Role
1997	"Falling in Love (Is Hard on the Knees)"	Aerosmith	Bride
