= Bugs (2003 film) =

- Screenplay by: Robinson Young; Patrick J. Doody; Chris Valenziano
- Story by: Patrick J. Doody; Chris Valenziano; Joe Conti
- Directed by: Joseph Conti
- Starring: Antonio Sabato Jr. Angie Everhart
- Music by: William T. Stromberg

Production
- Producers: Brad Krevoy; Adam Richman; Mieke ter Poorten Berlin; Derek Rappaport
- Cinematography: Richard Wincenty
- Editor: Richard Byard
- Running time: 82 minutes

Original release
- Network: Sci Fi Channel
- Release: September 6, 2003

Bugs is a 2003 American science-fiction-horror film that debuted as a Sci Fi Pictures TV-movie on the Sci Fi Channel on September 6, 2003. It starred Angie Everhart and Antonio Sabato Jr.

== Plot ==
When a civil engineer (Antonio Sabàto Jr.) retrieves a mysterious biological sample from a body discovered in a tunnel, an entomologist (Angie Everhart) discovers it is from a scorpion-like creature. Investigating, the two find themselves trapped in the tunnel with ravenous, flesh-eating bugs and must rely on the scientist's knowledge of the insect world in order to escape

== Cast ==
- Antonio Sabàto Jr. as Matt Pollack
- Angie Everhart as Emily Foster
- R.H. Thomson as Reynolds
- Karl Pruner as Victor Petronovich
- Duane Murray as Benton
- Romano Orzari as Garcia
- Stephanie Moore as Manning
- Wes Williams as Bergstein (Wes "Maestro" Williams)
- Elias Zarou as Chief Lembeck
- Lynne Griffin as Medical Examiner
- Neil Foster as Dr. Franklin
- Tim Post as Jack Ball
- Peter Kosaka as Mr. Yokoto
- Nigel Hamer as VIP Man
- Nanci Steele as VIP Woman
- Xuan Fraser as Beat Cop
- Dean Copkov as Cohen
- Tig Fong as Howsan
- Steve Lucescu as Porter
