= The Substitute: Failure Is Not an Option =

2001 film by Robert Radler

The Substitute: Failure Is Not An Option
- DVD cover
- Directed by: Robert Radler
- Written by: Dan Gurskis
- Based on: Characters by Roy Frumkes; Rocco Simonelli; Alan Ormsby
- Produced by: Robert Radler
- Starring: Treat Williams; Angie Everhart; Patrick Kilpatrick; Bill Nunn; Tim Abell
- Cinematography: Richard M. Rawlings Jr.
- Edited by: Lou Angelo
- Music by: Stephen Edwards
- Distributed by: Artisan Entertainment
- Release date: April 24, 2001
- Running time: 91 minutes
- Country: United States
- Language: English

The Substitute: Failure Is Not An Option (also known as The Substitute 4) is a 2001 action thriller film directed by Robert Radler and starring Treat Williams as Karl Thomasson, a former mercenary who must infiltrate a military school's faculty to stop the actions of a white supremacist cult. A sequel to The Substitute 3: Winner Takes All (1999) and is the fourth and final installment in The Substitute film series and was released direct-to-video.

== Plot ==
Captain Karl Thomasson (Williams), an ex-Special Forces soldier and retired mercenary, is approached by his old army buddy Teague who gives him a mission: working undercover at a military school where Ted, Teague's nephew, is one of the cadets. Teague believes that the cadets and the student faculty are part of a group of neo-Nazis called the Werewolf Unit. Officially, the Werewolves are a special unit being run at the school. Karl accepts the mission and begins working as a history teacher at the school, seeking to expose and eradicate the unit.

While investigating, Karl teams up with Devlin, a martial arts teacher at the school who served with Karl in the U.S. Army. They learn that Colonel J.C. Brack (Patrick Kilpatrick) is leader of the unit and Ted is one of the cult members.

During his investigation, Karl befriends and falls for Dr. Jenny Chamberlain (Angie Everhart) who believes that the Werewolf Unit is just another elite group and is unaware of their clandestine assignments. One night he gets ambushed by two enemy students possibly sent by Brack. Karl dispatches his would be assailants and survives the night.

Karl and Devlin discover information of a recent mission the Werewolf Unit were a part of in disrupting Minority operated businesses in order to cause racial chaos around town. Karl tries to warn Teague that the Werewolf Unit are not what Teague believes it to be.

The Werewolf Unit are later assigned to take on what Teague believes to be a training exercise which in reality is a terrorist action to destroy and bomb a power plant facility that powers a section of the town's minority-controlled businesses and housing. The mission runs smoothly as Teague has second thoughts and, in the process, loses one of the cadets as he falls to his death. With Lim leading the assault, they evacuate as the bombs detonate.

Brack enlists the help of a renegade North Korean operative named Lim (Simon Rhee) to help get rid of Karl and his allies to silence them from ascertaining the truth of the secret operations the Werewolf Unit conduct. Around this time Karl and Jenny discovers a romantic relationship which causes more friction with Brack.

== Cast ==
- Treat Williams as Captain Karl Thomasson, former U.S. Special Forces soldier and mercenary. Thomasson states in this film that he earned his Doctorate in contemporary literature.
- Angie Everhart as Dr. Jenny Chamberlain, an attractive doctor at the academy and Karl's love interest.
- Patrick Kilpatrick as Colonel J.C. Brack, the military academy's Commanding officer and founder of the Werewolf Unit.
- Bill Nunn as Luther, an ex-soldier who works as a janitor at the military academy.
- Tim Abell as Sergeant Devlin, an ex-soldier who works as a martial arts teacher at the academy.
- Grayson Fricke as Ted Teague, cadet and Werewolf Unit member who later regrets joining it.
- Simon Rhee as Lim, Korean mercenary who is a Drill Instructor of the Werewolf Unit.
- David Leitch as Van, mercenary who is a Drill Instructor of the Werewolf Unit.
- Scott Miles as Buckner, racist cadet and the cadet commander of the academy and of the Werewolf Unit.
- Brian Beegle as Frey, Ted's best friend and Werewolf Unit member.
- Samantha Thomas as Harmon, bossy female cadet and Werewolf Unit member.
- Jonathan Michael Weatherly as Mauk, a cadet at the academy.
- Lori Beth Edgeman as Cunningham, female cadet who is picked on by Harmon.
- Moe Michaels as Robson, a cadet at the academy.
- J. Don Ferguson as General Robert Teague, Karl's old war buddy and Ted's uncle.
- K.C. Powe as Sissy Brack, waitress at a bar and Brack's daughter.
- Lonnie R. Smith Jr. as Yulee, mercenary and Thomasson's friend.
- Laura-Shay Griffin as Dixie, waitress at the local bar.

== Reception ==
Robert Pardi of TV Guide rated it 2/4 stars and wrote that the film, though preposterous, is tolerable if one lowers their expectations. Aaron Beirle of DVD Talk rated it 0.5/5 stars and wrote, "Even for the low-budget action (or, as I call it 'cable action') genre, Substitute 4 remains a pretty dull actioner."
