= Backup dancer =

Performer who dances with or behind the lead performer

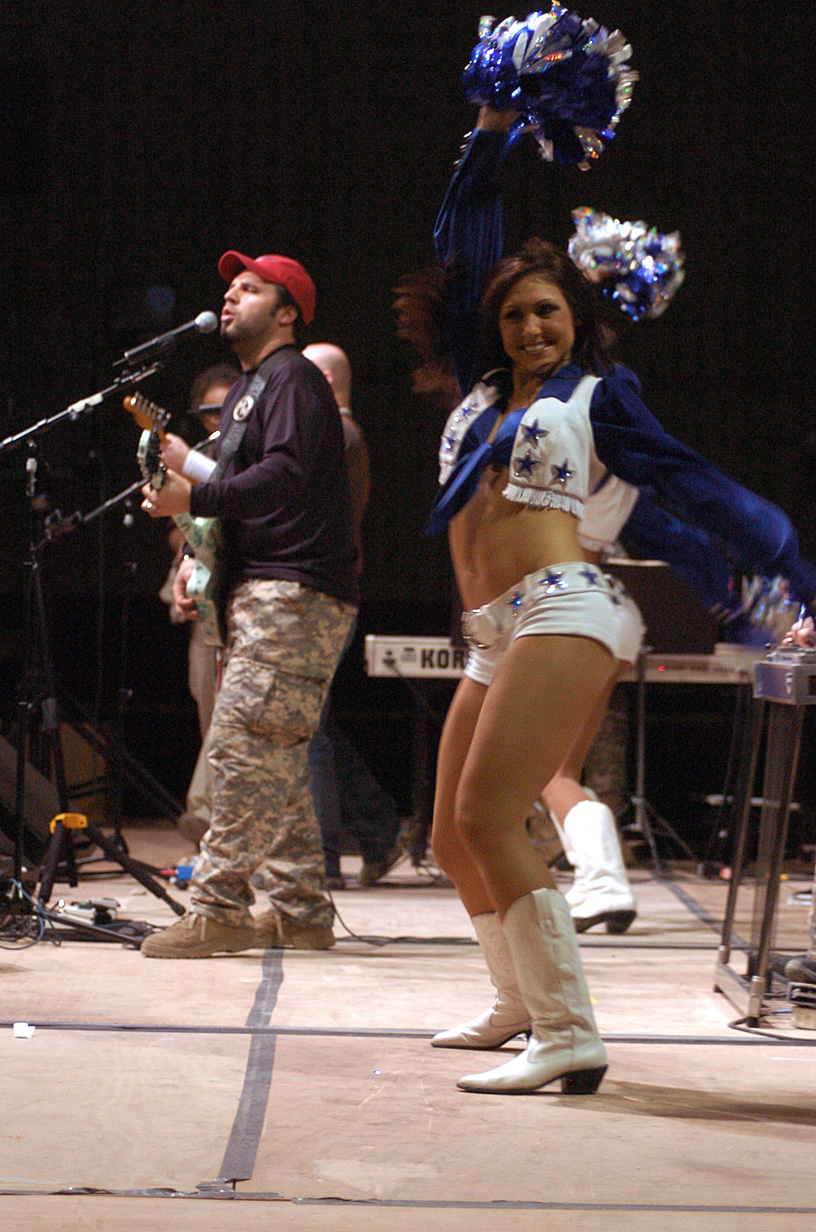
A backup dancer performing for Mark Wills

A backup dancer also known as background dancer is a performer who dances with or behind the lead performers in a live musical act or in a music video. Their movements (especially where there are many moving together) improve the visual aesthetics of the lead performer, and provide a symmetry and rhythm to accompany the music.

== Backup dancers ==
Some performers began their music careers as backup dancers for other artists, including:

- Lee Know from Stray Kids (for BTS)
- Kevin Federline (for Britney Spears, Michael Jackson, Justin Timberlake, Gwen Stefani, Pink, Christina Milian, and LFO)
- FKA twigs
- Cris Judd (for ex-wife Jennifer Lopez's 2001 video "Love Don't Cost a Thing")
- Rain (for Park Jin-young and Park Ji-yoon)
- Tupac Shakur (for the Digital Underground)
- Michael K. Williams
- Zendaya (for Selena Gomez)

== Gallery ==
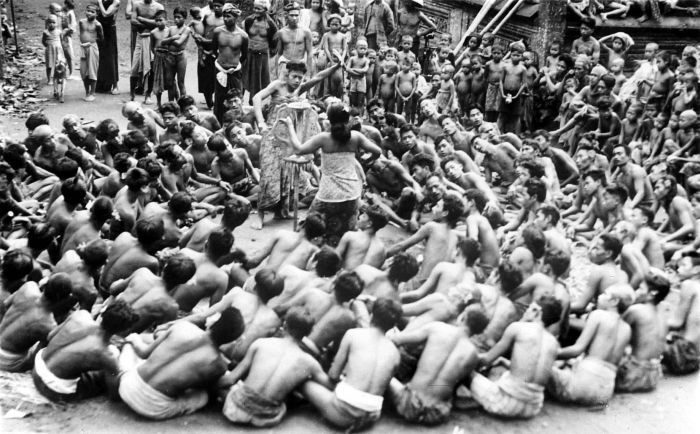
Balinese dancers in 1937 performing in a kecak

A backup dancer on stage with a band at a 2015 New Year's event in Berlin

== See also ==
- Corps de ballet
- Backing vocalist
- Extra (actor)
- Taxi dancer – a paid dancer in a partner-dance
