= You Thought You Knew =

2025 memoir by Kevin Federline

- Author: Kevin Federline
- Language: English
- Genre: Memoir
- Publisher: Listenin
- Publication date: October 21, 2025
- Publication place: United States
- Pages: 228
- ISBN: 9798999612502

You Thought You Knew is a 2025 memoir by American dancer and entertainer Kevin Federline, published by Listenin on October 21, 2025. The book recounts Federline's early life and dance career and his relationship with Britney Spears, drawing extensive coverage for his allegations against Spears and for Spears' public response.

== Background and development ==
Federline worked on the book intermittently over the course of five years. He has framed the project as a way to record his perspective on his fame for his two sons with Spears as they reached adulthood, stating that he wants them to "be able to move forward in their lives". The book was written with ghostwriter Alex Holstein, editor-in-chief at Listenin, the book's publisher.

== Synopsis ==
The memoir covers Federline's upbringing and dance career and centers on his relationship with Britney Spears, including their 2004-2007 marriage and later efforts co-parenting. The narrative discusses the media scrutiny surrounding their family and his view of her conservatorship, and introduces a series of allegations about Spears.

== Reception ==
Ahead of the memoir's release, in a statement on X on October 16, 2025, Britney Spears expressed her exhaustion and hurt at the "constant gaslighting" she has experienced from Federline. Spears defended herself against leaked rumors about her from the memoir, stating that she had "always asked and almost begged" for her sons with Federline to be a part of her life.

Coverage by major outlets emphasized that the book introduces new allegations about Spears and complicates existing narratives about her conservatorship and the Free Britney movement.Vanity Fair criticized the memoir for being overly focused on Spears and for its he-said-she-said narrative, noting that it is "hard not to cringe at Federline's blatant double standards". Vulture wrote that, despite Federline's claims that he hopes for Spears' recovery, the book is "mostly about clearing his own name at the expense of hers, all of which has been done with their sons in the middle."
