= My Growing Pains =

- Scrubs episode
- Episode no.: Season 7 Episode 5
- Directed by: Zach Braff
- Written by: Mike Schwartz
- Production code: 705
- Original air date: November 29, 2007

Guest appearances
- Sam Lloyd as Ted Buckland; Christa Miller as Jordan Sullivan; Phill Lewis as Hooch; Efren Ramirez as Ricky; Sterling Beaumon as Josh Winston; Aaron Ikeda as Rex; Susan Leslie as Mrs. Winston; Paul Webster as Mr. Winston; Arthur Roberts as Board member

Episode chronology
← Previous "My Identity Crisis"	Next → "My Number One Doctor"
- Scrubs season 7

"My Growing Pains" is the fifth episode of the seventh season and the 144th episode of the American television sitcom Scrubs. Written by Mike Schwartz and directed by main series star Zach Braff, it originally aired on November 29, 2007, on NBC.

== Plot ==
When J.D. and Turk take a trip down memory lane to their first prank together while planning another, Dr. Cox tells J.D. that he has to "grow up" due to his new responsibilities of fatherhood. J.D. tells Turk that they need to act their age, and Turk tries to convince J.D. that he doesn't need to completely lose his inner child. At the same time, Dr. Cox tries to make Jack grow up by refusing to talk to him in a "funny voice" that entertains him. Meanwhile, Dr. Cox has an 11-year-old patient, Josh, who is diagnosed with leukemia. He has to deal with the child's parents, who want to keep the condition a secret from Josh. Dr. Cox tells Josh without his parents' consent. Carla, who was against the decision, warns that the parents might take legal action against him. But when Josh explains that he already knew something was wrong even before Dr. Cox told him so, Dr. Cox announces his deed triumphantly to Carla, she insists that he "just doesn't get it". At the same time, Turk tortures J.D. by trying to get him to play some of their childish games, like Find the Saltine.

Dr. Kelso, whose birthday arrives, insists that he is turning 58; however, when Carla reveals that he's been saying the same thing for years, Elliot enlists the Janitor and Ted's help to find out Kelso's real age. They find out that he is in fact 65, and throw him a surprise birthday party. However, the reason that Kelso never mentioned his real age was because he knew that when he turned 65, he would have to step down as chief of medicine. Sure enough, a board member later approaches Kelso in his office and informs Kelso that during the upcoming months they would be searching for his replacement. Kelso reluctantly agrees, asking only that the fact that he was retiring be kept a secret.

At the end of the episode, J.D. and Dr. Cox confront Turk and Carla in a "tag team" battle. Carla says that Dr. Cox has no right to deny Josh his childhood by forcing him to deal with such a terrible disease, saying that Dr. Cox's own unhappy childhood is not a justifiable excuse. Turk also makes J.D. realize that his new responsibilities do not necessarily preclude his individual expression; according to Turk, there is no reason for J.D. to "change who he is." The episode ends with J.D. and Turk playing at "World's Most Giant Black Doctor", asking people to sign a petition to make the hospital more giant-accessible, while Dr. Cox talks to Jack using the "funny voice" over a webcam.

== Reception ==
Joel Keller of TV Squad said that this episode is "yet another example of how the writers have made the show funnier by making things less wacky. In fact, the lack of wackiness parallels how both Turk and J.D. are becoming more like real adults than either of them want to be."

Seth Amitin of IGN gave this episode a very positive review; rating it 9.4/10.

== Continuity ==
- Dr. Kelso has reached the hospital's retirement age, 65, and the board is actively searching for his replacement.
- Hooch may have been fired after attacking a group of interns that J.D. and Turk told to follow him all day. He apparently held them in a hostage situation.
- It is revealed that there was once a Caramel Bear, a Hispanic friend of J.D. ("Vanilla Bear") and Turk ("Chocolate Bear") named Ricky (played by Efren Ramirez) that they met on their first day of college together. On their second day as "bears for life", he joined J.D and Turk as they prank someone by leaving a flaming bag of dog feces on their porch. He was caught while J.D and Turk ran away. J.D assumes that Ricky died during the prank, since his parents came and packed up his belongings, as well as the fact his roommate got straight A's for the semester, even though he didn't go to class (see Pass by catastrophe).
