= The Ex-Wives Club =

- Starring: Shar Jackson; Marla Maples; Angie Everhart
- Country of origin: United States
- No. of episodes: 5

Production
- Running time: 60 minutes

Original release
- Network: ABC
- Release: May 28 – June 25, 2007

The Ex-Wives Club was a 2007 American reality television program hosted by Shar Jackson and Marla Maples and Angie Everhart.

It focused on the hosts helping regular people as they get over painful and difficult divorces. Self-help author Debbie Ford also appeared on the show as a life coach.

It was produced by Glassman Media and premiered on ABC on May 28, 2007. It was cancelled on June 25, 2007.
