= Kevin Federline =

American rapper and entertainer (born 1978)

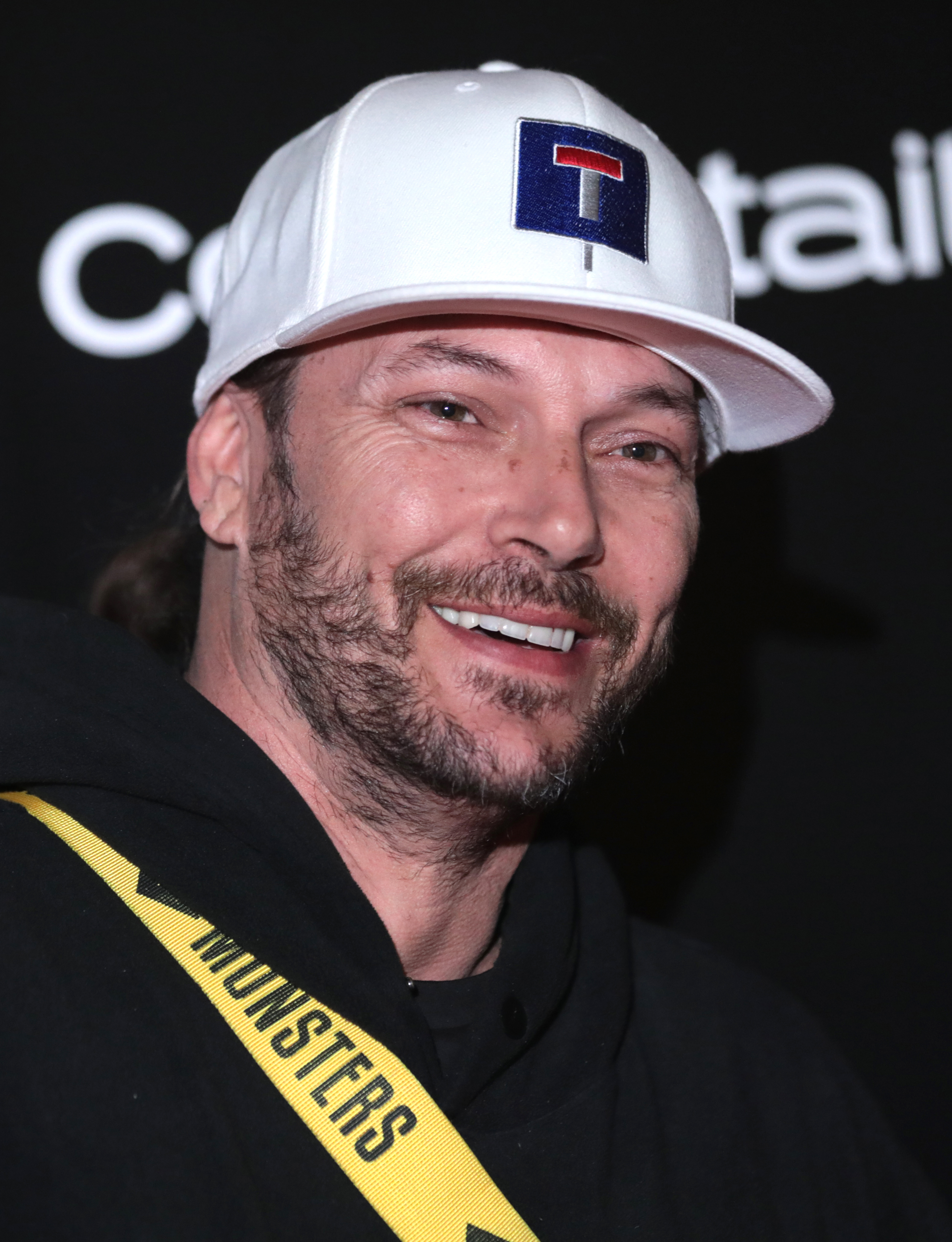
- Federline in 2023
- Born: Kevin Earl Federline; March 21, 1978 (age 48); Fresno, California, U.S.
- Occupations: Dancer; actor; DJ
- Years active: 1996–present
- Spouses: Britney Spears (m. 2004; div. 2007) Victoria Prince (m. 2013)
- Partner: Shar Jackson (2000–2004)
- Children: 6
- Musical career
- Genre: Hip hop
- Instrument: Vocals
- Label: Federation

Kevin Earl Federline (born March 21, 1978), also known as K-Fed and FedEx, is an American dancer, actor, and DJ. He is the ex-husband of singer Britney Spears, and fought a public child custody battle following their divorce. In 2006, Federline released a debut album, Playing with Fire, which was panned by critics as one of the worst albums ever released. He has since made a number of television and film appearances, and also worked as a DJ. His memoir, You Thought You Knew was published on October 21, 2025.

== Early life ==
Kevin Earl Federline was born on March 21, 1978, in Fresno, California, to parents Mike and Julie (née Story), a car mechanic and former bank teller from Oregon, respectively. Federline's parents divorced when he was eight years old; then he moved to Carson City, Nevada, with his mother, but returned to Fresno when he was 11, when he and his brother Chris moved to his father's house. In the ninth grade, Federline dropped out of high school (later earning a certificate of General Educational Development), and delivered pizzas for work.

== Career ==
=== 1996–2004: Early career as a dancer ===
In 1996, Federline moved to Los Angeles to pursue a career in dance and began dancing with a nonprofit organization called Dance Empowerment. Federline lived in a one-bedroom apartment with six roommates. For a number of years, Federline worked as a backup dancer for Aaliyah, Michael Jackson, Justin Timberlake, Destiny's Child, Pink, and LFO. He appeared as a Dirt Track Dancer in two episodes of the television sitcom Nikki (2001–2002) and as a dancer on The Drew Carey Show (2001). He also had an uncredited role as an Angel Dancer for Cher on the sitcom Will & Grace (2002). He appeared as a dancer in a commercial for department store chain Target.

Federline has appeared in several music videos as a dancer, including Christina Milian's "AM to PM" (2001), Pink's "Get the Party Started" (2001), Michael Jackson's "You Rock My World" and Justin Timberlake's "Like I Love You" (2002). He also appeared as a dancer in the dance drama film You Got Served (2004). Federline has said that dancers often don't get enough credit for their work, telling People magazine: "There's nobody that gets less credit than somebody dancing."

=== 2005–2009: Wrestling and musical debut ===
Federline and his then-wife Britney Spears starred in UPN's reality television series Britney & Kevin: Chaotic (2005), which consisted of their home videos. The series chronicles the couple's relationship from their courtship, engagement and wedding. He was nominated for a Choice TV: Male Reality/Variety Star award for his role on Britney & Kevin: Chaotic at the 2005 Teen Choice Awards. He portrayed a hunter in a commercial for Britney Spears's fragrance "Fantasy". Federline appeared on the cover and a 12-page shoot for L'uomo Vogue, an Italian version of Men's Vogue, shot by Steven Meisel. He subsequently guest-starred as Cole "Pig" Tritt, an arrogant teenager who harasses investigators on a job, in an episode of CSI: Crime Scene Investigation (2006). He also appeared on NBC's game show 1 vs. 100 (2006), along with the cast of Las Vegas. In June 2006, he teamed up with Richard Branson to launch a "Pennies for a Purpose" campaign, which aimed to save the U.S. penny from annihilation.

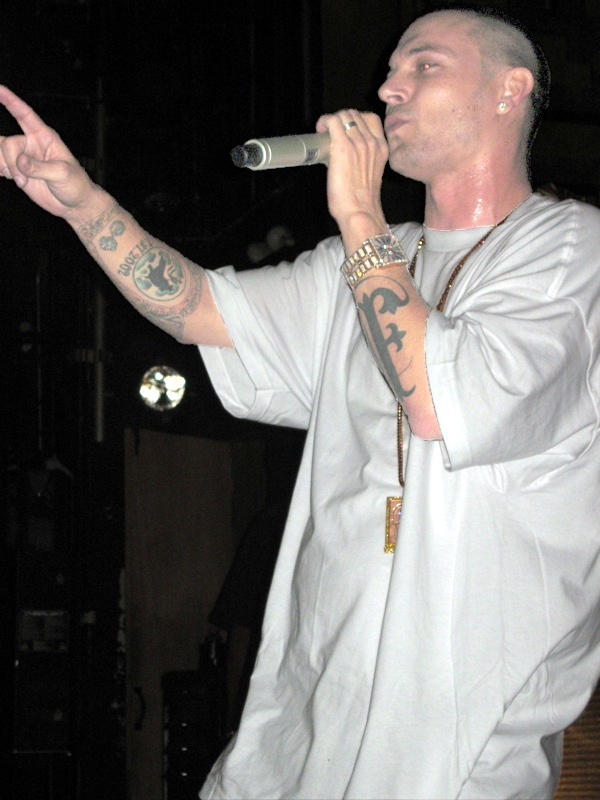
Federline in 2006.

Federline initially released a download-only song, "Y'all Ain't Ready", and a physical single, "PopoZão" in 2006, shortly after his marriage to Spears. Following poor critical reaction, neither song was included on his debut album. Instead, the first official single was "Lose Control", which he premiered on the Teen Choice Awards show on the Fox network in late summer 2006. He released his debut album, Playing with Fire, on October 31, 2006, with the album being panned by critics. Federline has been signed to model for the Five Star Vintage line by the San Francisco-based Blue Marlin clothing company. The initial series of ads ran in August 2006 and was subsequently extended for Christmas 2006. The line he modeled for the fall 2006 was the top-selling line in Macy's, Kitson, and Lord & Taylor.

Federline appeared on WWE programming to promote his album, Playing with Fire, and participate in an angle. He first appeared on the October 16, and October 23, 2006, editions of WWE Raw, in which he got into physical altercations with WWE Champion John Cena. The following week, he came to the ring to aid Johnny Nitro in his match against John Cena. After Cena got in Federline's face, Federline slapped him hard. Federline appeared again during the November 5, 2006, pay-per-view event Cyber Sunday, hitting Cena with King Booker's World Heavyweight Championship belt and helping Booker win the Champion of Champions match that was organized between Cena, Booker, and Big Show. The next night, November 6, 2006, he challenged Cena to a match at the New Year's Day edition of Raw, which Cena accepted. He went on to win this no-disqualification match thanks to interference from Johnny Nitro and Umaga. Later in the night, after John Cena's main event match, Cena went after Federline and brought him into the ring and delivered his FU finishing move twice before cameras stopped rolling. According to the Wrestling Observer Newsletter, Federline was well-received backstage. Sources say he worked so well with the company and personnel that the WWE may give him a regular role on the company's show Raw in the near future. Other sources and wrestlers have spoken about Federline's generally good attitude backstage as well.

Federline starred in a Nationwide Mutual Insurance Company commercial during Super Bowl XLI on February 4, 2007, as part of its "Life Comes at You Fast" ad series. In the commercial, Federline initially appeared in a music video, rapping about living a high-flying lifestyle. Then reality sets in as Federline is shown now working in a fast-food restaurant with his manager yelling at him, the punchline of the ad being "Life comes at you fast". The Hollywood Reporter wrote that Federline was paid $377,000 for the commercial, and made $15,000 for appearing at his 29th birthday party at Pure nightclub in Las Vegas. He also earned $50,000 for a number of Las Vegas club appearances in December 2007. Federline appeared on the December 2007 cover of Details magazine, and he was named 7th most-influential man under 45, a spot he shared with Larry Birkhead. HuffPost reported three months later, that the December 2007 issue was on track to sell more than 75,000 copies, nearly 15,000 copies more than Federline's March 2005 cover issue.

Federline guest-starred as Jason "J-Fed" Federline in three episodes of The CW's television series One Tree Hill (2008). He played Lollipop Love Dancer in The Onion Movie (2008), which was filmed in 2003, and a Canadian border guard in the comedy film American Pie Presents: The Book of Love (2009). In February 2009, he announced plans to start a children's clothing line.

=== 2010–present: Focus on DJing and memoir ===
In 2010, Federline appeared on the seventh season of VH1's weight-loss reality television show Celebrity Fit Club. He told Access Hollywood, that the reason for his weight gain was feeling depressed about his divorce from Spears and not feeling happy with himself. While appearing on the show, Federline lost 30 pounds. In November 2011, on a weight-loss show in Australia called Excess Baggage (2012), he was hospitalized for what was called "heat stress". Filming was taking place in November which is the hottest time of the year in the Kimberley region of northern Western Australia. On January 23, 2012, he suffered chest pains while filming the show.

On March 7, 2015, Federline worked as a DJ at Heat nightclub in Orange County alongside DJ Prophet. He also hosts club events regularly with his wife Victoria Prince, such as a fantasy football event in 2015, with Federline saying: "We take [fantasy football] so seriously that there are months of planning that go into the strategy of what you're going to do with the other people. This is our 6th season. It's been same people from the beginning. We have a waiting list to get into our league." He was featured as an ice sculpture in fast-food restaurant chain Jack in the Box's television commercial in 2015. In April 2016, Federline released a music video for his new song, "Hollywood" with rapper Crichy Crich. Produced by Styles & Complete, the song was inspired by "the ridiculousness of Hollywood". In a 2016 interview with Vegas Seven, Federline said that he has been producing music for other artists. In 2018, he was a DJ at Three Wisemen club in Scottsdale, Arizona. He has also played DJ sets in Washington, Texas and California. In June 2019, Federline performed a DJ set at Harrah's Hotel and Casino in Atlantic City, New Jersey.

In his first televised interview in over a decade, Federline and some of his family members appeared in a one-hour special interview on the Australian show 60 Minutes in September 2022. In the interview, Federline discussed his family life, saying: "I want my sons to have the closest thing to a normal life that they can possibly have because it'll make them better people. They see me, so they know that if they really want to get away they know how to get away."

On August 6, 2025, People magazine announced that Federline is set to publish a memoir entitled You Thought You Knew and released a photo of Federline's upcoming book cover two weeks later. The book was released on October 21, 2025. Federline told People magazine: "This book is extremely intimate and transparent. I achieved my biggest dreams, dealt with crushing heartbreak and endured constant ridicule, all while becoming the father my children needed as they experienced non stop emotional turbulence. If you've ever had questions, you'll find answers here."

== Personal life ==
=== Relationship with Shar Jackson ===
In 2000, Federline began dating actress and singer Shar Jackson. He was engaged to Jackson, with whom he has a daughter, Kori Madison Federline (b. July 31, 2002), and a son, Kaleb Michael Jackson Federline (b. July 20, 2004). The couple separated shortly before their son's birth, as Federline ended things with Jackson for a relationship with pop singer Britney Spears. Jackson later commented that Federline's relationship with Spears "wasn't like just breaking up a relationship. It was like breaking up a family", but the pair sustained an amicable relationship, with Jackson complimenting his parenting.

=== Marriage to Britney Spears ===
After three months of dating, Federline and Spears announced their engagement in July 2004; they were married on September 18 in a nondenominational ceremony at a residence in Studio City, California, which became legally valid on October 6. Due to the fact that Federline got into a relationship with Spears when his ex-girlfriend Shar Jackson was pregnant with Federline's second child, the romance between Federline and Spears received intense attention from the media, with Federline being seen as a "gold digger". The controversy of his breakup with Jackson, his relationship with Spears, the accusations of him being a "gold digger", and the disparity in fame between him and Spears all made Federline both a frequent target of ridicule and an extremely disliked celebrity. Federline and Spears have two sons together.

On November 7, 2006, Spears filed for divorce from Federline, citing irreconcilable differences and asking for both physical and legal custody of their two sons, with visitation rights for Federline. The following day, Federline filed a response to Spears' divorce petition, seeking physical and legal custody of their children. According to a representative for Federline's lawyer, the divorce filing "caught Kevin totally by surprise". On December 4, 2006, MS NOW reported that Federline set up a home for himself and his family in the Hollywood Hills. The pair reached a global settlement agreement in March 2007 and their divorce was finalized on July 30, 2007.

On October 1, 2007, a court ruling granted Kevin Federline sole physical custody of his children, with legal custody to be decided. On the late evening of January 3, 2008, police were called to Spears' home after the singer reportedly refused to relinquish custody of her children to Federline (as told in Spears' memoir, because Federline was refusing to allow Spears to see her kids for lengthy periods and she feared that she wouldn't see them again). Spears was taken from her home on a stretcher and hospitalized at Cedars-Sinai Medical Center. As a result of this, Federline was "awarded sole legal custody and sole physical custody of the minor children".

On July 26, 2008, court papers were filed stating Federline would retain sole legal and physical custody of the children while Spears would get visitation rights that would increase over time. In addition to this, Federline would receive $20,000 per month from Spears in child support as well as additional funds to cover any custody-related legal expenses.

=== Marriage to Victoria Prince ===
Federline was first linked to former volleyball player Victoria Prince in 2008, when the two were both on the same recreational bowling team, the Party Animals. It was reported that Prince was previously arrested for assault and disturbing the peace. She was also charged with possession of a dangerous weapon on school premises. Their first daughter was born in 2011. They wed on August 10, 2013. Their second daughter was born in 2014. In the summer of 2023, the family moved to Hawaii, because Prince was offered a job at a Hawaii university. Prince played volleyball and graduated from the University of Hawaii at Manoa in 2005.

== Filmography ==
=== Film ===
Year	Title	Role	Notes
2004	You Got Served	Dancer	
2008	The Onion Movie	Lollipop Love Dancer	
2009	American Pie Presents: The Book of Love	Canadian Border Guard	

=== Television ===
Year	Title	Role	Notes
2001	The Drew Carey Show	Dancer #7	Episode: "Drew Gets Out of the Nuthouse"
2001–02	Nikki	Dirt Track Dancer	Episode: "Home Sweet Homeless" & "Uneasy Rider"
2002	Will & Grace	Angel Dancer for Cher	Episode: "A.I.: Artificial Insemination: Part 2"
2005	The Fabulous Life of	Himself	Episode: "Britney Spears & Kevin Federline"
2005	Britney & Kevin: Chaotic	Himself	Main Cast
2006	CSI: Crime Scene Investigation	Cole "Pig" Tritt	Episode: "Fannysmackin'"
2006	1 vs. 100	Himself/Mob Member	Episode: "Episode #1.6"
2006–07	WWE Raw	Himself	Recurring Cast: Season 14-15
2008	One Tree Hill	Jason "J-Fed" Federline	Guest Star: Season 5 Episode: 3-5
2010	Celebrity Fit Club	Himself	Main Cast: Season 7

=== Music videos ===
Year	Title	Artist	Role	Notes
2001	"You Rock My World"	Michael Jackson	Dancer	
2001	"AM to PM"	Christina Milian	Dancer	
2001	"Get the Party Started"	P!nk	Dancer	
2002	"Like I Love You"	Justin Timberlake	Dancer	
2004	"My Prerogative"	Britney Spears	Groom	
2008	"Pork and Beans"	Weezer	Dancer	

== Discography ==
=== Studio albums ===
Title	Details	Peak chart positions
Title	Details	US
Playing with Fire	Released: October 31, 2006; Label: Reincarnate; Format: LP, CD	151

=== Singles ===
- "PopoZão" (2006)

=== Other songs ===
- "Y'All Ain't Ready" (2005)
- "Lose Control" (2006)
- "Privilege" (2006)
- "Rollin' V.I.P" (2007)
- "Hollywood" (2016)

=== Music videos ===
- "Lose Control" (2006)

=== Guest appearances ===
- "You Should" (from the mixtape Optimus Rime by Ya Boy) (2008)
- "Expectations" (from the mixtape Alien by Ya Boy) (2016)

== Published works ==
- Federline, Kevin. You Thought You Knew (2025). Listenin.
