= Shar Jackson =

American actress (born 1976)

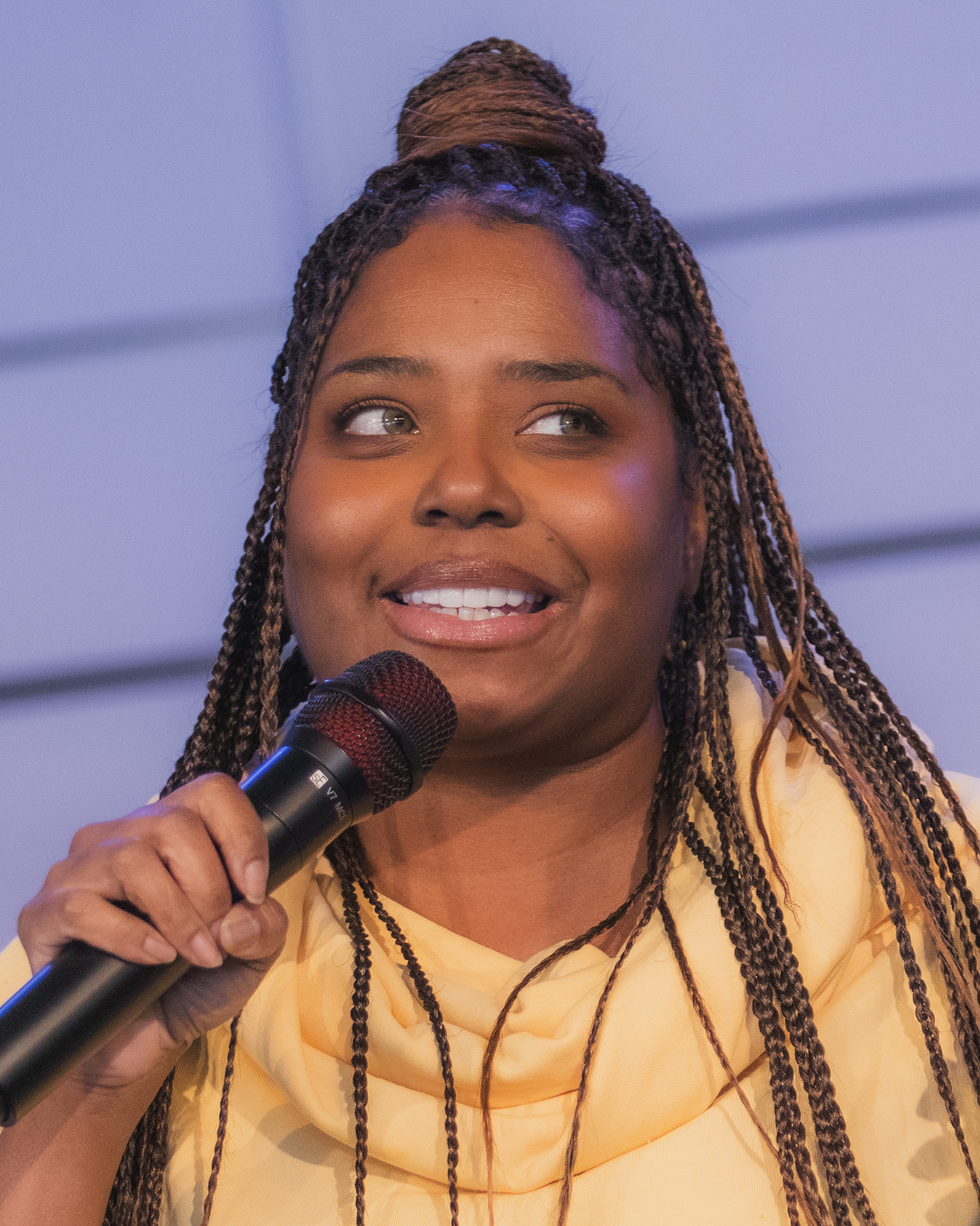
- Jackson in 2026
- Born: Sharisse Jackson; August 31, 1976 (age 50); Boston, Massachusetts, U.S.
- Occupations: Actress, singer
- Years active: 1993–present
- Partner: Kevin Federline (2000–2004)
- Children: 4

Sharisse Jackson (born August 31, 1976) is an American actress. She is best known for her portrayal of Niecy Jackson on the UPN sitcom Moesha (1996–2001). She was crowned the winner of MTV reality show Celebrity Rap Superstar in 2007.

== Early life ==
Jackson was born in Boston, Massachusetts. Her mother is of mixed African-American and Puerto Rican heritage.

== Career ==
From 1996 to 2001, Jackson played the titular character's best friend, Niecy Jackson, on the UPN TV show Moesha (starring Brandy Norwood). The same year she played Carlene in the HBO film Grand Avenue. She has also appeared on The Parkers, The Bernie Mac Show, and My So-Called Life. In 1997, Jackson co-starred in the Nickelodeon movie Good Burger alongside Kel Mitchell and Kenan Thompson.

Jackson was a member of the short-lived pop girl group, Mpulz, where she was also a writer. The group's only single, "The Journey," was included on The Princess Diaries soundtrack.

She was also featured on the ABC reality series The Ex-Wives Club with Marla Maples and Angie Everhart. The show aimed to support people who had recently gone through separation or divorce. In 2009, Jackson was cast in the film I Do... I Did!. She also had a role in the 2009 dance-oriented film Steppin: The Movie.

Jackson later appeared on the seventh season of VH1's Celebrity Fit Club: Boot Camp, which premiered in February 2010. In 2016, Jackson and her daughter, Cassie, partook in the Lifetime reality series The Mother/Daughter Experiment: Celebrity Edition. In 2023, she made her cameo in the Good Burger reboot, Good Burger 2.

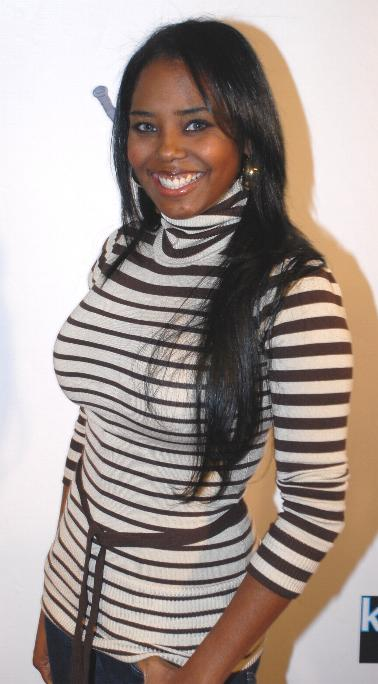
Jackson in 2007

== Personal life ==
Jackson has two other children, a son and a daughter, with her high-school ex-boyfriend. In 2004, Jackson was engaged to Kevin Federline, with whom she has a daughter and a son. The couple separated shortly before their son's birth, instigated by Federline's relationship with pop singer Britney Spears. Jackson sustained an amicable relationship with Federline, complimenting his parenting. In 2015, Jackson became a grandmother, as her elder daughter Cassalei welcomed a baby girl with actor Christopher Massey.

== Filmography ==
=== Film ===
| Year | Title | Role | Notes |
|---|---|---|---|
| 1993 | CB4 | Tamika | |
| 1996 | Grand Avenue | Carlene | Television film |
| 1997 | Good Burger | Monique | |
| 2000 | Love & Basketball | Felicia | |
| 2002 | Roller Wheelz | | |
| 2003 | Family Reunion: The Movie | | |
| 2008 | Toxic | Daphne | |
| 2009 | Steppin: The Movie | Uwamma Layne | |
| 2009 | I Do...I Did | Candy | |
| 2009 | The House That Jack Built | Alexa | |
| 2011 | Blood Effects | Lisa | |
| 2012 | One Blood | Tina | |
| 2015 | Touched | Payne | |
| 2019 | Olden Times | Karen | Television film |
| 2019 | Take a Stan | Detective Stroud | |
| 2020 | Reboot Camp | Anita Mooney | |
| 2022 | A Polished Soul | Jocelyn King | Also producer |
| 2023 | Good Burger 2 | Herself | Cameo |

=== Television ===
| Year | Title | Role | Notes |
|---|---|---|---|
| 1993 | Roc | Rhonda | Episode: "Up in the Attic" |
| 1993 | Tall Hopes | Charlayne | Episode: "Get the Jet" |
| 1993 | Hangin' with Mr. Cooper | Monica | Episode: "Boyz in the Woodz" |
| 1994 | Getting By | Juanita-The Date | Episode: "In the Driver's Seat" |
| 1994 | South Central | Shanelle | Recurring Cast |
| 1994 | On Our Own | Sara Louise | Episode: "A Family Affair" |
| 1994 | Me and the Boys | Cicely | Episode: "Christmas Story" |
| 1994 | My So-Called Life | Crystal | Episodes: "Father Figures", "Guns and Gossip" |
| 1995 | Minor Adjustments | Tammy | Episode: "Pilot" |
| 1995 | The Parent 'Hood | Lynette | Episode: Just Say Yes, No, or Maybe |
| 1995 | Hangin' with Mr. Cooper | Carol | Episode: "Halloween" |
| 1996 | The Steve Harvey Show | Angel | Episode: "That's My Mama" |
| 1996–2001 | Moesha | Niecy Jackson | 122 episodes |
| 1998 | Smart Guy | Stacey | Episode: "Achy Breaky Heart" |
| 1998 | Sister, Sister | Desiree | Episode: "Young At Heart" |
| 1999 | Clueless | Niecy Jackson | Episode: "Prom Misses, Prom Misses" |
| 1999–2000 | The Parkers | Niecy Jackson | Episodes: "Scary Kim", "Kimberlale" |
| 2001 | Girlfriends | Niecy Jackson | Episode: "Old Dog" |
| 2002 | The Proud Family | Bethany | Episode: "Hip-Hop Helicopter" |
| 2006 | The Bernie Mac Show | Valerie | Episode: "Spinning Wheels" |
| 2007 | The Ex-Wives Club | Self | |
| 2008 | Everybody Hates Chris | Alyson | Episode: "Everybody Hates Ex-Cons" |
| 2010 | Celebrity Fit Club | Herself | 5 episodes |
| 2010 | Life After | Herself | 1 episode |
| 2013 | Trent & Tilly | Z Mcnabb | Episode: "Z and the Big TV" |
| 2015 | Hollywood Divas | Herself | |
| 2016 | The Mother/Daughter Experiment: Celebrity Edition | Herself | |
| 2021 | Shameless | Constance | Episode: "DNR" |

== See also ==
- List of Afro-Latinos
