= James Brand (musician) =

American musician (1976–2010)

James C. Brand (1976–2010) was an American musician.

Moz was Brand's dark ambient, power electronics project. Founded in Houston, Texas, in 1997, transplanted to Anchorage, Alaska in 2000, and dubbed Post Power Electronics by Gary of Bed Molt/a sonic deterrent. Early releases were in the harsh noise genre and had no clear themes, but later works were not only less harsh but tended to deal with social and left-wing / anarchist political issues. Most recent work is influenced by Buddhist and other Asian spirituality, due to Brand's increasing involvement with Buddhism (including stints living in monasteries in both America and Asia). However, even though devoted to Theravada Buddhism, Brand still maintains his previous anarchist political views and identifies himself as a "Dhammic Socialist".

Brand died unexpectedly at the age of 34 from a brain aneurism in Anchorage, Alaska on August 30, 2010.

== Releases and Collaborations ==
MOZ has had numerous releases on 4 continents, most notable were splits and collaborations with Thurston Moore of Sonic Youth, KK Null of Zeni Geva, (Man is the) Bastard Noise, Government Alpha, a sonic deterrent, the Haters and Hermit. Most MOZ releases are Split releases with another artist, keeping a sort of collectivist attitude to releasing albums. Brand was married, but at one time was the ex-boyfriend of Houston experimental/noise artist Richard Ramirez. He also has worked with Ramirez in a project called, d/S.

== Other work ==
Besides releasing music as MOZ, JC Brand has composed music for several films for Trisomy Films all of which were produced by Kim Henkel the writer of the screen play for the original The Texas Chain Saw Massacre two of which were released by SHOCK-O-RAMA Cinema and the latest, The Wild Man of the Navidad, by IFC. He is also a published author and currently devotes most of his creative output to writing though continues to record for Belgian experimental label: Silken Tofu.

== Partial discography ==
- CD "The Broken Tusk of Ganesha" on Silken Tofu (Belgium)
- Split CD with KK Null on crionic mind (USA)
- Split/Collaboration CD with Thurston Moore "Tribute to Martin Luther King JR." on breathmint (USA)
- Split CD with Daruin on NEUS (Japan)
- Split CD with Government Alpha on Verbrante Erde (Germany)
- Split CD with Armenia on bizarre audio arts (Ecuador)
- Split 7" record with a sonic deterrent on anti-everything/maladjusted (USA)
- Split 7" record with A) Torture Mechanism on Balefire/ MT6 (USA)
- Split 10" record with Flatline Construct on maladjusted/ Let it Rot (USA/Canada)
- Collaboration 7" with Bastard Noise and Hermit on Balefire/ CRUCIAL BLAST (USA)
- Compilation 7" record "Soun: An Anonymous and Random Compilation/Composition" on Game Boy (USA)

== Filmography ==
- The Wild Man of the Navidad (2008)
- Voltagen (2003)
- Headcheese (2002)
