= Tobe Hooper's unrealized projects =

Over the course of his career, American film director Tobe Hooper had worked on a number of projects which never progressed beyond the pre-production stage under his direction. Some of these projects fell into "development hell" or were officially cancelled, while others were taken over and completed by other filmmakers.

== 1950s ==
=== The Heir of Frankenstein ===
In late 1958, when Hooper lived in Baton Rouge, he and a group of Louisiana State University students formed a production company and began shooting The Heir of Frankenstein, a twist on the classic horror tale. Hooper wrote the script and served as producer, while Philip Shaheen served as director. They were unable to finish the production however, due to lack of funds. "We got about one-third of the way through filming it when we ran out of money," Hooper said.

=== The Blue Nights ===
In 1959, Hooper enlisted the help of six of his peers at Grand Prairie High School to be his crew for another incomplete film, The Blue Nights. At the time, Hooper stated to local press that he hoped to sell the finished product to either a television or motion picture studio.

== 1970s ==
=== Untitled Hansel and Gretel film ===
After working together on his first feature Eggshells (1969), Hooper enlisted Kim Henkel to help him develop a script for a modern version of Hansel and Gretel. The two kept the original idea, "only instead of being lured to a gingerbread cottage with gumdrops, it was a little more sinister," recalled Henkel. To update the story, Hooper and Henkel studied literature on real-life cannibals and serial killers. This collaboration eventually led to the screenplay for The Texas Chain Saw Massacre (1974), after scrapping their initial idea.

=== Bleeding Hearts ===
Right before receiving the offer to direct Eaten Alive (1976), Hooper recalled having just finished the screenplay to a Los Angeles-set murder mystery based on a true story that took place in the same era as Chinatown (1974). After struggling to raise the necessary $10–12 million budget for the project, he instead signed on to make Eaten Alive as his next film. Its title was Bleeding Hearts and was co-written by oft-collaborator Kim Henkel. The story was a fictionalized adaptation of the infamous 1931 Winnie Ruth Judd "Trunk Murders" case.

=== Dead and Alive ===
I know Hooper has a trick for breaking in the back door to true strangeness, real madness. I know because he took me into that crazy place a few times during Dead and Alive – scared the hell outta me.

— co-writer L. M. Kit Carson

After completing The Texas Chain Saw Massacre (1974), Hooper said that he had several projects in development and was eager to explore comedy. Working for Warner Bros. in 1978, he co-wrote the screenplay Dead and Alive with L. M. Kit Carson, whom he would later collaborate with on The Texas Chainsaw Massacre 2 (1986). Described as a "comedy-mystery", the film was conceived as a potential John Travolta vehicle and centered on a meteor striking a small-town carnival, sinking it underground and turning it into a kind of "floppy disk" of sorts; where the carnival's memory replays endlessly in a time loop and leaves its occupants in a permanent "dead and alive" state. "It was mysterious; it had a lot of twists and turns," Hooper remembered of the project. He compared its tone and character behavior to those found in the works of Federico Fellini and Roman Polanski. "I wave regret [sic] not being able to get the film put together," he added. "And I worked quite a long time [on it]."

=== Beyond the Valley of the Texas Chainsaw Massacre ===
The original concept for what became The Texas Chainsaw Massacre 2 (1986) was a pitch by Hooper and co-writer Kim Henkel titled Beyond the Valley of the Texas Chainsaw Massacre. The idea was meant to satirize the horror-comedy Motel Hell (1980), which itself was a spoof of Hooper's original film. The pitch involved a group of kids who end up in an entire town filled with murderous, backwoods cannibals.

Later, in the early 1980s, Hooper worked with John Milius to develop another iteration of a sequel that would have picked up where the first film left off. Though this version too would fall through, as Hooper could not secure proper funding. "[The project] was so crazy, maybe they thought 'This guy's a lunatic'," said Hooper. "John never thought that."

=== The Thing from Another World remake ===
In 1977, Hooper was approached by Universal Pictures to direct the remake of The Thing from Another World (1951). After he and Kim Henkel's draft was rejected, John Carpenter would go on to helm the 1982 film. Co-producer Stuart Cohen later described Hooper's version as an "Antarctica Moby-Dick" centered around a character dubbed The Captain hunting a large, non-shapeshifting alien.

=== The Dark ===
Hooper had been hired by Film Ventures International to direct The Dark (1979) but was fired by the producers two days into shooting for falling behind schedule. He was replaced by John Cardos.

== 1980s ==
=== Venom ===
Venom (1981) was to be originally directed by Hooper, who had shot nine total days of footage for the film. Hooper had also developed the script with the writer during pre-production, scouted and chose the locations. At the time of its initial release, star Klaus Kinski boasted about how he and other cast and crew members ganged up on Hooper in the first weeks of production in order to have him replaced. On the 2003 DVD commentary, director Piers Haggard insisted that the material Hooper had shot was dropped from the final cut of the film. "[Hooper's footage] was all sort of derivative of Fritz Lang, all lit from below... kind of a bit stereotyped... cliched," Haggard said.

=== Night Skies ===
In the early 1980s, Steven Spielberg suggested Hooper to direct his concept for a proposed horror sci-fi film about a family's encounter with menacing aliens, titled Night Skies. John Sayles was hired to write the script, and special effects artist Rick Baker was chosen to oversee the design of the alien creatures. The film was scheduled to begin shooting after Spielberg returned from filming Raiders of the Lost Ark (1981). Although Night Skies as a film would never reach production, it helped inspire not only E.T. the Extra-Terrestrial (1982), but Hooper's own Poltergeist (1982), for which he had also been hired by Spielberg to direct.

=== King Solomon's Mines ===
Early on in its development, Hooper was attached to direct Cannon Films' remake of King Solomon's Mines (1950), with Telly Savalas named as a possible alternative co-star. The resulting film was directed by J. Lee Thompson.

=== Spider-Man ===
In the mid-1980s, Hooper was slated to direct a film based on the Marvel Comics character Spider-Man for Cannon Films. "It would have been cool," he later reflected. "An origin story... but we really needed CGI to do it properly."

=== Pinocchio the Robot ===
In October 1985, it was reported that The Cannon Group, who had produced Hooper's Lifeforce (1985), Invaders from Mars and The Texas Chainsaw Massacre 2 (both 1986), would finance his new film based on the Pinocchio fairy tale, titled Pinocchio the Robot. Cannon head Menahem Golan wanted Lee Marvin to play Geppetto, in a story written by Dan O'Bannon and Don Jakoby. Austin Trunick, author of The Cannon Film Guide, claimed that the project was "supposedly intended for children." Despite entering early stages of pre-production, and promotional material made, the film was not produced.

== 1990s ==
=== The Dentist ===
On May 15, 1995, in the Daily Variety "Future Films" issue, Hooper was listed as director of a film called The Dentist written by Brent V. Friedman and David Robinson, to be produced by Mark Borde through Carpe Dentum Productions and distributed by Orion Pictures. By August, the project was revealed to be a "big-screen sci-fi thriller" starring Christopher Lloyd, scheduled to enter production in late September. However, reports in September claimed The Dentist was then in limbo.

== 2000s ==
=== Untitled noir thriller ===
In 2000, Hooper told The A.V. Club that he was at that time working on a "suspenseful" noir thriller in the tradition of the Humphrey Bogart starrer Dark Passage (1947).

=== Planning Lawrence Fankhauser's Death ===
At the 2002 Cannes Film Festival, Hooper struck a deal to direct the dark comedy Planning Lawrence Fankhauser's Death, a farcical take on the world of career criminals attempting to move up the food chain, written by Steven Sessions. He developed the project for Etchie Stroh's production company Moonstone Entertainment.

=== I Walked with a Zombie remake ===
In the mid-2000s, RKO Pictures LLC was revived and sought to produce remakes of their entire catalogue slate. Hooper was called in to pitch for a remake of I Walked with a Zombie (1943), and had contacted screenwriter Jared Rivet to help develop the film.

=== White Zombie: Louisiana ===
Instead of remaking I Walked with a Zombie, Hooper and Jared Rivet opted for the Bela Lugosi starrer White Zombie (1932). Based on the 1929 novel The Magic Island by William Seabrook, Hooper and Rivet worked very closely on the adapted script together, making sure to hit all the major plot points of the original film. Speaking about their project in the book Untold Horrors, Rivet recalled:

"We definitely wanted to amplify the weirdness. Tobe was in a stage where he was in love with what David Lynch was doing. Inland Empire (2006) had come out and he was enamored with the idea that Lynch could just grab a digital camera and some friends and just go off and make a feature. And of course Danny Boyle had done the same thing with 28 Days Later (2002), so he wanted to just make something that was run 'n' gun."

Hooper wanted to shoot the film entirely on soundstages to give the film a surreal, dreamlike look. Makeup artist John Goodwin was even called in at one point to do tests for the design of the creatures. The project was shopped around to various companies, with the title at one point even changed to The Devil's Breath to sound more marketable. In 2009, it landed at The Bubble Factory, who agreed to produce the film under the condition that the ideas present in their script be altered. This draft was then scrapped and, in 2012, Brandon Wyse boarded the film as writer. Now titled White Zombie: Louisiana, this version, unlike the previous draft, focused on cannibalistic zombies. Hooper approved of Wyse's script, though never met with him directly. Despite talk of Ron Perlman and Tony Todd potentially starring, the film stalled in development for several years until Hooper's death in 2017. Wyse, who from that point had still been getting feedback, didn't see a reason to carry on.

=== From a Buick 8 ===
In October 2007, Hooper replaced George A. Romero as director of the feature adaptation of Stephen King's From a Buick 8. Johnathon Schaech and Richard Chizmar wrote the script, which had been optioned by Moonstone Entertainment and Amicus. Production on the film stalled in 2009 due to problems obtaining financing.

== 2010s ==
=== Eaten Alive remake ===
In June 2010, Hooper teased the notion of remaking his own film Eaten Alive (1976). "There's a lot of work to do," he said. "It would be weird. And the challenge would be to replace Neville Brand. That's another film and another story, though."

=== Untitled dream project ===
On a 2010 episode of Post Mortem with Mick Garris, when asked which subject he would choose if he were able direct anything he wanted on a limitless budget, Hooper said he would make a film along the lines of a Charles Dickens novel or Doctor Zhivago (1965). "That would be a wonderful area to go into," he added.

=== Undisclosed John Milius collaboration ===
In a 2013 interview for Ain't It Cool News, Hooper revealed that a couple years prior, he and John Milius had discussed collaborating on a potential project but that they had parted ways due to other commitments at the time, but could still reconnect.

=== Undisclosed non-horror film ===
In 2015, Hooper revealed himself to be at work on a new film outside of the horror genre, questioning how well-received it would be when compared to what he's best known for. "I realize that when [this film] premieres, there will be references to my older work," he acknowledged. "It's a bit like Orson Welles and Citizen Kane (1941); when your first film is so well received, expectations will always be high."

== Bibliography ==
- Alexander, Dave (2021). Untold Horror. Dark Horse Comics. ISBN 9781506719023.
