= Wild Man of the Navidad =

Wild human in Texas folklore

The Wild Man of the Navidad, sometimes referred to as the Wild Woman of the Navidad, in Texas folklore, is the story of an escaped African slave and other alleged wild humans reported to have been living in the Texas wilderness near the Navidad River during the mid-19th century. Various accounts of the story exist, and the tale has become intertwined with other alleged accounts of wild humans, as well as with Bigfoot.

According to a historical marker previously erected in Lavaca County: "A mysterious runaway Negro slave who alternately terrified and aroused pity of settlers in this region for about 15 years. The mysterious exile, at first with a companion, appeared along the Navidad bottoms about 1836. Hiding in trees during day, he stole into kitchens at night for food, but always left half. He also took tools, returning them later, brightly polished. Slaves called him "The thing that comes", fearing a ghost. Captured in 1851, the wild man proved to be an African chief's son. Resold into slavery, he died peacefully as "Old Jimbo" in 1884".

== History ==
In 1836, residents living along the Navidad River in what is now Sublime, reported food and items missing from their homes and farms. Various tools were reported to have disappeared only to reappear later after seemingly being polished, and torn clothing was returned after having been stitched. According to writer Murray Montgomery of Texas Escapes magazine, various accounts of wild people were reported by fearful residents, describing the culprits as stealthy and hair-covered. Some reports described both a male and a female pair, and local slaves referred to the alleged female as "The Thing that Comes". Attempts to capture the alleged wild people were unsuccessful.

According to historian Myra Hargrave McIlvain, in 1851 residents captured a nude African man of unknown origin who was living in the wild and did not speak English. It was reported that a sailor arrived in the area who spoke the man's language and claimed the man was an African prince who had been sold into slavery as a child. After reaching Texas, he and another slave escaped, but the other died from exposure. According to some reports, the Wild Man of the Navidad was eventually sold back into slavery in Victoria, Texas, and died in 1884.

The Texas State Gazette published a runaway slave notice from June 24 to August 12, 1854, that read "an AFRICAN well known as the Wild Woman of the Navidad, supposed to belong to Beckford, late of Virginia".

A collection of these early accounts were later published in their entirety in J. Frank Dobie's book Tales of Old-Time Texas in 1928.

== Film ==
In 2008, a horror film loosely based on the folklore entitled The Wild Man of the Navidad was released, written and directed by Duane Graves and Justin Meeks, and co-produced by Kim Henkel. The filmmakers based the story on the journals of Dale S. Rogers, who claimed bizarre encounters he and his family had with Bigfoot-like creatures in the Sublime area in the 1970s.
