= Kill or Be Killed (2015 film) =

2015 film

- Theatrical release poster
- Directed by: Duane Graves; Justin Meeks
- Written by: Duane Graves; Justin Meeks
- Produced by: Karrie Cox; Marcus Cox
- Cinematography: Brandon Torres
- Edited by: Duane Graves
- Music by: John Constant
- Distributed by: RLJ Entertainment
- Release date: April 10, 2015 (DIFF)
- Running time: 104 minutes
- Country: United States
- Language: English

Kill or Be Killed (filmed as Red on Yella, Kill a Fella) is a 2015 American Western film written and directed by Duane Graves and Justin Meeks. Meeks stars as a notorious Texas criminal whose gang is slowly picked off one-by-one by an unknown killer. It premiered at the ninth Dallas International Film Festival and was released in the US on March 1, 2016.

== Plot ==
In 1900 Texas, Claude "Sweet Tooth" Barbee, Frank "Blockey" Jackson, and Tom Nixon ambush a chain gang to free their fellow gang member, "Slap" Jack Davis. Davis knows where the gold from their last robbery is, but the others are dismayed when it turns out to be 500 mi (800 km) away. Nixon, their leader, balks at the journey, but the others threaten to go without him. On the way, they meet a traveling salesman and his ward, a teenager who operates a ventriloquist's dummy. Amused by the puppet, the men pause to listen to their pitch, only to become enraged when the salesman beats the boy. After killing the salesman, Barbee accepts the boy, Willie, into their gang. They are joined shortly by Goody Spotswood, their scout. As they pass through a town, the gang kills several people while robbing a local church, and Davis is wounded.

Meanwhile, Rudy Goebel murders his employer. When his wife protests, he kills her, too. As he dumps his wife's body in the cellar, he calls down to his children, chastising them for an unspecified transgression. After Goebel locks his children in with their mother's corpse, the Nixon gang barges into the house, seeking aid. All but Barbee eat Goebel's drugged soup. As Goebel tortures Davis, Barbee wakes and kills Goebel. The gang leaves the house in the morning. The next time they camp, they wake to find Nixon dead. After they accuse each other of his murder, Barbee settles the matter by saying Nixon was old and probably died of natural causes.

Barbee becomes the de facto leader, and his gang robs several towns on their way to the gold. Sheriff Everheart and Deputy Peak chase after him, encouraged by the reward and the thought of being hailed as heroes. The Barbee gang takes refuge at the Wilberforce homestead, where Jackson rapes and murders the Wilberforces' daughter. Barbee reluctantly kills her vengeful father but stops the gang from killing the other family members. Although spooked that one of their horses has been brutally slaughtered, they steal a horse from the Wilberforce barn and flee.

After they rob a whorehouse, ex-prostitute Pearl follows after them, asking to join. As she and Barbee become closer, he tells her about the gold. She and Barbee have sex at a hotel where Everheart and Peak are staying, and Barbee leaves a taunting note for them. When Barbee wakes, Pearl and the map to the gold are gone, and Willie is dead. The others blame Pearl for Willie's murder, but Barbee reasons Pearl is no murderer; instead, he suggests a crazed native American is responsible. Spotswood dies next, and Barbee is haunted by nightmares of a bestial man who hunts his gang.

While Davis seeks aid from a doctor, Pearl tips off Everheart. Barbee, Davis, and Jackson come upon a man who is attacking a woman. Satisfied this is Spotswood's murderer, they kill him. When they set up camp, Jackson wanders off. As Barbee and Davis find Jackson's mutilated body, Everheart and Peak catch up to them. Peak is killed in the resulting shootout, and Davis is further wounded. Everheart chases Barbee and Davis to a barn, intending to smoke them out, but Barbee kills Everheart. Convinced his wounds are fatal, Davis reveals that the gold is at the bottom of a well. That night, Barbee dreams of the bestial man, and wakes to find that Davis' throat has been slit. At Davis' request, Barbee mercy-kills Davis as he slowly bleeds to death.

Barbee pretends to shoot himself in grief. When the killer reveals himself, Barbee is surprised to find it is one of Goebel's sons. After killing the boy, Barbee reaches the well. There, he is wounded by a bounty hunter, whom he kills. Barbee collects the gold, only to be attacked by Goebel's other son, a twin. Surprised, Barbee asks how they could be so evil at such a young age. The boy pushes the wounded Barbee into the deep well, where he finds Pearl's corpse at the bottom. The boy walks off, ignoring Barbee's cries.

== Cast ==
- Justin Meeks as Claude "Sweet Tooth" Barbee
- Paul McCarthy-Boyington as "Slap" Jack Davis
- Greg Kelly as Frank "Blockey" Jackson
- Deon Lucas as Goody Spotswood
- Bridger Zadina as Willie Carson
- Larry Grant Harbin as Tom Nixon
- Arianne Margot as Pearl
- Luce Rains as Sheriff Everheart
- Timothy McKinney as Deputy Peak
- Edwin Neal as Bargsley
- Michael Berryman as Dr. Pepperdine
- Pepe Serna as Rudy Goebel
- Gayland Williams as Ivy Goebel

== Production ==
The story was loosely inspired by the exploits of real-life outlaw Sam Bass, who operated in Texas in the nineteenth century. After Duane Graves and Justin Meeks premiered an earlier collaboration, The Wild Man of the Navidad, they pitched the concept of a gritty Western to The Weinstein Company. They said that when TWC took it seriously, they focused their attention on making a tight script. Although they lost their contacts at TWC, Kim Henkel, their former film instructor, recruited them to make Butcher Boys. After that work-for-hire experience, they returned to their own project. They said people praised their script but doubted their ability to realize it within their budgetary limitations. To do this, Meeks and Graves used as many existing locations as possible. When they had difficulty shooting in a real church, they scouted locations until they found an Old West replica church that looked realistic. Filming took a total of six weeks.

== Release ==
Kill or Be Killed premiered at the ninth Dallas International Film Festival on April 10, 2015. RLJ Entertainment released it in the United States on March 1, 2016.

== Reception ==
Richard Whittaker of The Austin Chronicle wrote that the film's uncompromising authenticity can be a detriment, as it makes the dialog difficult to understand at times. Whittaker says the film has more of a noir feel than most Westerns, and the characters, who become more realized in the second act, are mostly shades of gray. Chris Coffel of Bloody Disgusting rated it 3/5 stars and wrote that the film is worth watching despite its flaws, which include CGI blood and a somewhat confusing narrative. Though he praised the acting of Meeks and McCarthy-Boyington, Coffel said the rest of the cast "leave a lot to be desired". Mark L. Miller of Ain't It Cool News compared it to 1960s Spaghetti Westerns, saying that it also includes themes from horror films. Miller called it "one of those fantastic genre mash-ups that work because it feels authentic and real".
