= Winnie Ruth Judd =

Convicted American murderer (1905–1998)

- Winnie Ruth McKinnell at her 1932 trial.
- Born: Winnie Ruth McKinnell; January 29, 1905; Oxford, Indiana, U.S.
- Died: October 23, 1998 (aged 93); Phoenix, Arizona, U.S.
- Other names: "The Trunk Murderess", "The Tiger Woman", "The Blonde Butcher"
- Occupation: Medical secretary
- Spouse: Dr. William C. Judd (m. 1924; died 1945)
- Conviction: Murder
- Penalty: Death; later commuted to incarceration

Winnie Ruth Judd (January 29, 1905 – October 23, 1998), born Winnie Ruth McKinnell, also known as Marian Lane, was a medical secretary in Phoenix, Arizona, who was accused of murdering her friends, Anne LeRoi and Hedvig “Sammy” Samuelson, in October 1931. The murders were discovered when Judd transported the victims' bodies, one of which had been dismembered, from Phoenix to Los Angeles, California, by train in trunks and other luggage, causing the press to name the case the "Trunk Murders". Judd allegedly committed the murders after a jealousy-based argument about Jack Halloran, a prominent Phoenix businessman.

Judd was tried for LeRoi's murder, found guilty, and sentenced to death. However, the sentence was later repealed after she was found mentally incompetent, and she was committed to the Arizona State Asylum for the Insane (later renamed the Arizona State Hospital). Over the next three decades, Judd escaped from the asylum six times; after her final escape during the 1960s, she remained at large for over six years and worked under an assumed name for a wealthy family. She was ultimately paroled in 1971 and discharged from parole in 1983.

Judd's murder investigation and trial were marked by sensationalized newspaper coverage and suspicious circumstances suggesting that at least one other person might have been involved in the crimes. Her sentence also raised debate about capital punishment in the United States.

== Background ==
Winnie Ruth McKinnell was born on January 29, 1905, to the Reverend H.J. McKinnell, a Methodist minister, and his wife, Carrie, in Oxford, Indiana. At age 17, she married Dr. William C. Judd, a World War I veteran more than twenty years her senior, and moved to Mexico with him. William was reportedly a morphine addict as a result of war injuries and had difficulty keeping a job, forcing the couple to move frequently and live on an uncertain income. The marriage was further strained by Winnie Ruth Judd's health problems and inability to bear children.

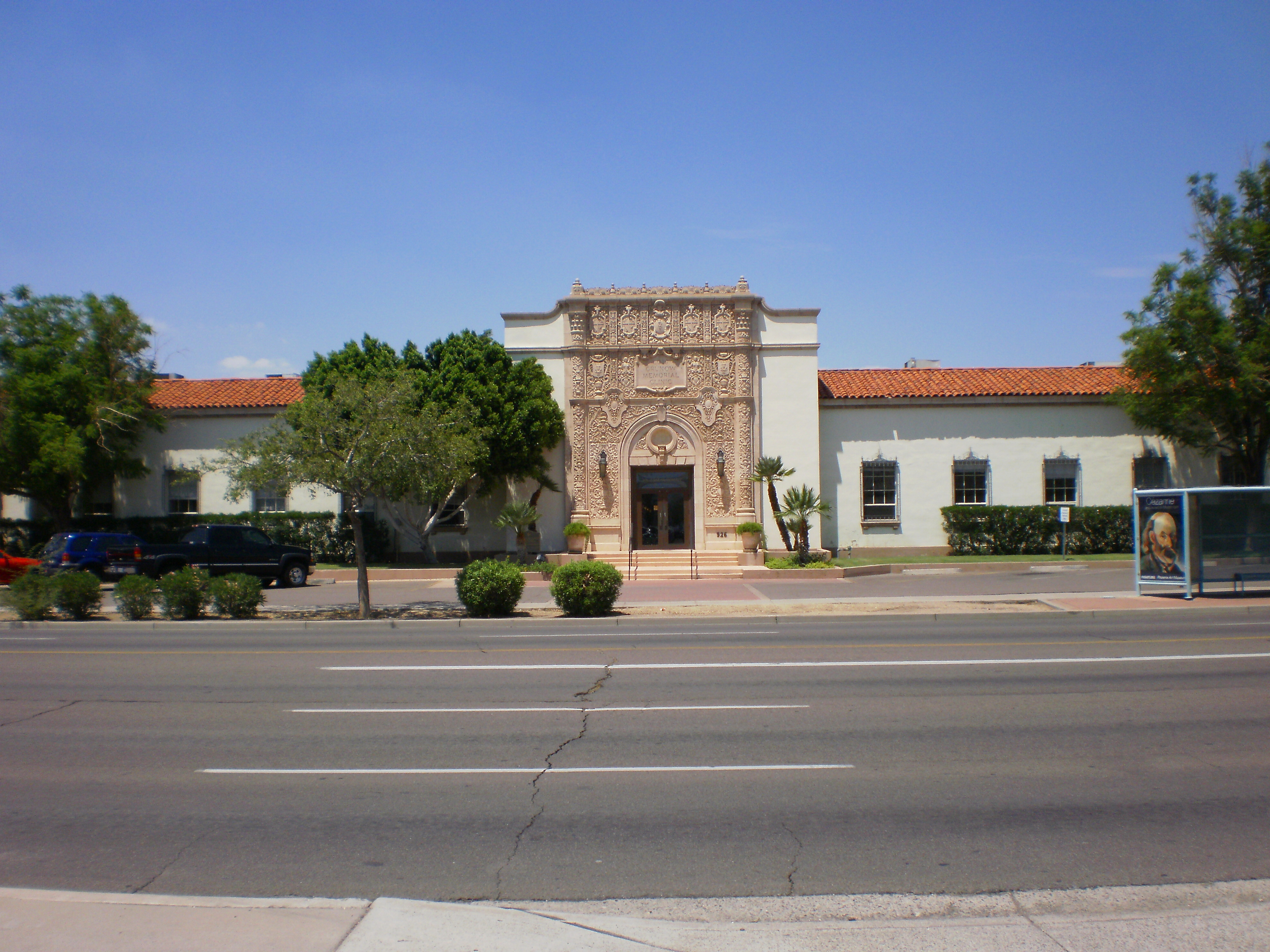
The Grunow Medical Clinic

By 1930, the couple were mostly living separately, although they remained in constant communication. Judd, called by her middle name of "Ruth", moved to Phoenix, Arizona, where she worked as governess to a wealthy family. During this time, she met John J. "Happy Jack" Halloran, a 44-year-old Phoenix businessman who was active in the city's political and social circles. Although married, Halloran was a known playboy and philanderer. Judd and Halloran became friendly and eventually had an extramarital affair.

After a few months, Judd began working as a secretary at the Grunow Medical Clinic in Phoenix. There, she met Anne Alexandra LeRoi (birthname Agnes Anne), an X-ray technician, and her roommate, Sarah Hedvig Samuelson, who had moved together from Alaska after Samuelson contracted tuberculosis. The two women were also friendly with Halloran. Judd became friends with LeRoi and Samuelson, and even moved in with them for a couple of months in 1931, but differences developed between the women and Judd soon returned to her own apartment, located a short distance away from the rented bungalow shared by LeRoi and Samuelson. At the time of the murders, Judd was 26 years old, LeRoi 27, and Samuelson 24.

== Murders ==
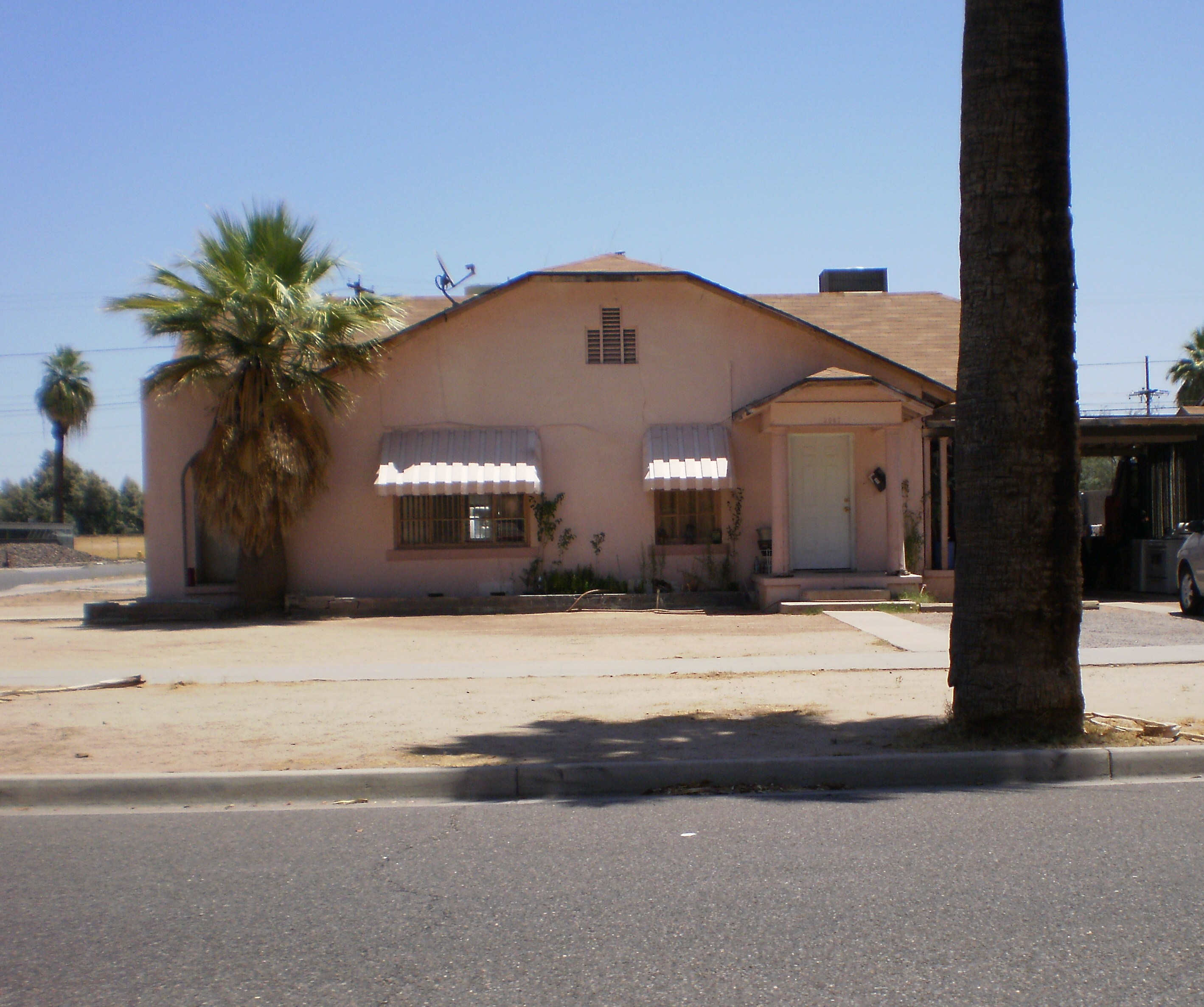
2010 photo of the bungalow where Samuelson and LeRoi were killed

According to police, on the night of October 16, 1931, LeRoi and Samuelson were murdered by Judd after an alleged fight among the three women over Halloran's affections. The prosecution at Judd's murder trial would suggest that quarrels over men and the relationship between LeRoi and Samuelson broke up the friendship of the three women, and that jealousy was the motive for the killings.

The two victims were killed with a .25 caliber handgun in their bungalow, located at 2929 (now 2947) N. 2nd Street. According to prosecutors, Judd and an accomplice then dismembered Samuelson's body and put the head, torso, and lower legs into a black shipping trunk, placing the upper legs in a beige valise and hatbox. LeRoi's body was stuffed intact into a second black shipping trunk.

=== Fleeing to Los Angeles ===
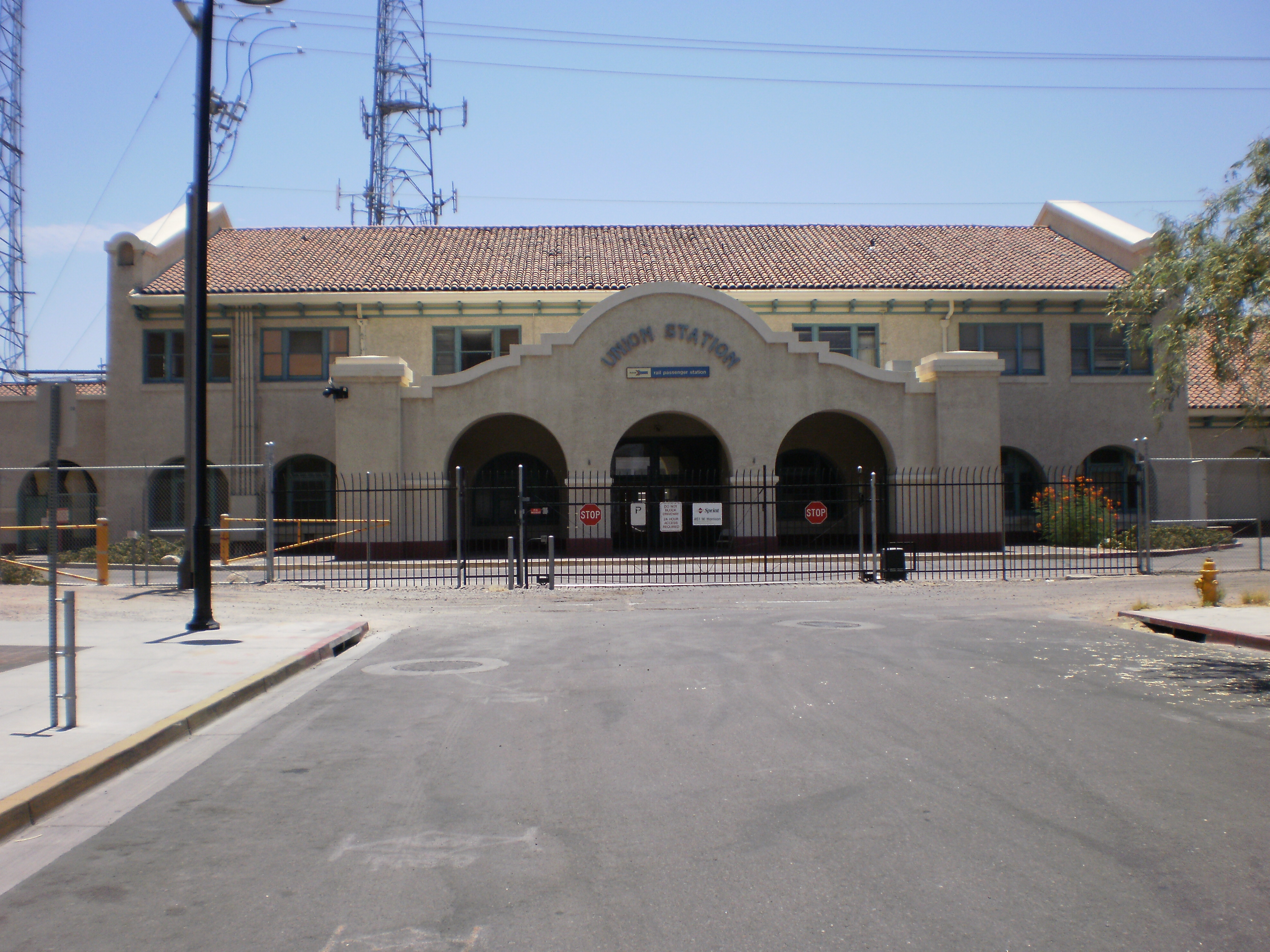
2010 photo of Phoenix's Union Station, where Judd departed with the trunks for Los Angeles

Two days after the murders, on Sunday, October 18, 1931, Judd, with her left hand bandaged from a gunshot wound, boarded the overnight Golden State Limited passenger train from Phoenix's Union Station to Los Angeles, California, along with the trunks and luggage containing the bodies. En route to Los Angeles Central Station, Judd's trunks came under suspicion from baggage handler H. J. Mapes due to their foul odor, as well as the fluids escaping from them. Mapes alerted the district baggage agent in Los Angeles, Arthur V. Anderson, that the trunks may have contained contraband deer meat. In those days, deer meat was frequently smuggled aboard trains running to the West Coast. Anderson tagged the trunks to be held until they could be opened for inspection. He asked Judd for the key, but she stated she didn't have it with her.

Burton McKinnell, Judd's brother and a junior at the University of Southern California, picked her up from the train station unaware of the murders or the bodies. Judd departed with her brother, leaving her trunks behind. At around 4:30 pm that afternoon, Anderson called the Los Angeles Police Department (LAPD) to report the suspicious trunks. After picking the locks of each trunk, the police discovered the bodies. Meanwhile, Burton had dropped his sister off somewhere in Los Angeles, where she proceeded to disappear. Judd hid out for several days until she surrendered to police in a funeral home the following Friday, October 23, 1931. The murder became headline news across the country, with the press calling Judd the "Tiger Woman" and the "Blonde Butcher". Eventually, the case came to be known in the media as the "Trunk Murders", and Judd as the "Trunk Murderess".

== Original police investigation ==
On the evening of Monday, October 19, 1931, Phoenix police first entered the bungalow where LeRoi and Samuelson had resided; neighbors and reporters were also allowed in and destroyed the original integrity of the crime scene. The following day, the bungalow's landlord placed newspaper ads in The Arizona Republic and The Phoenix Evening Gazette offering tours of the three-room bungalow for ten cents per person, attracting hundreds of curiosity seekers. During the trial, Judd's defense protested, stating, "By the advertisements in the newspapers, the entire population of Maricopa County visited that place." The police maintained that Judd's victims were shot while asleep in their beds. The mattresses from the two beds were missing the night the police entered. One mattress was later found with no blood stains on it miles away in a vacant lot; the other remained missing. No explanation was ever offered as to why one was found so far away, nor what became of the other mattress.

== Trial and conviction ==
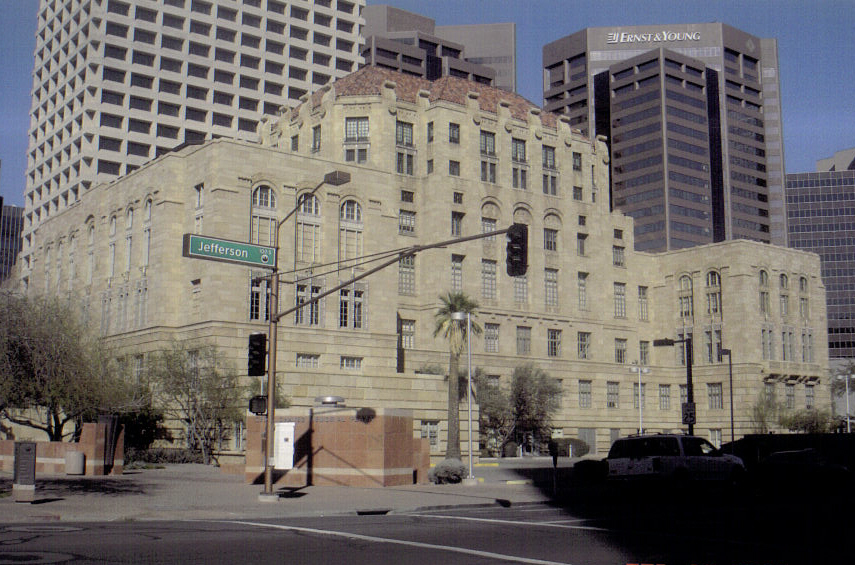

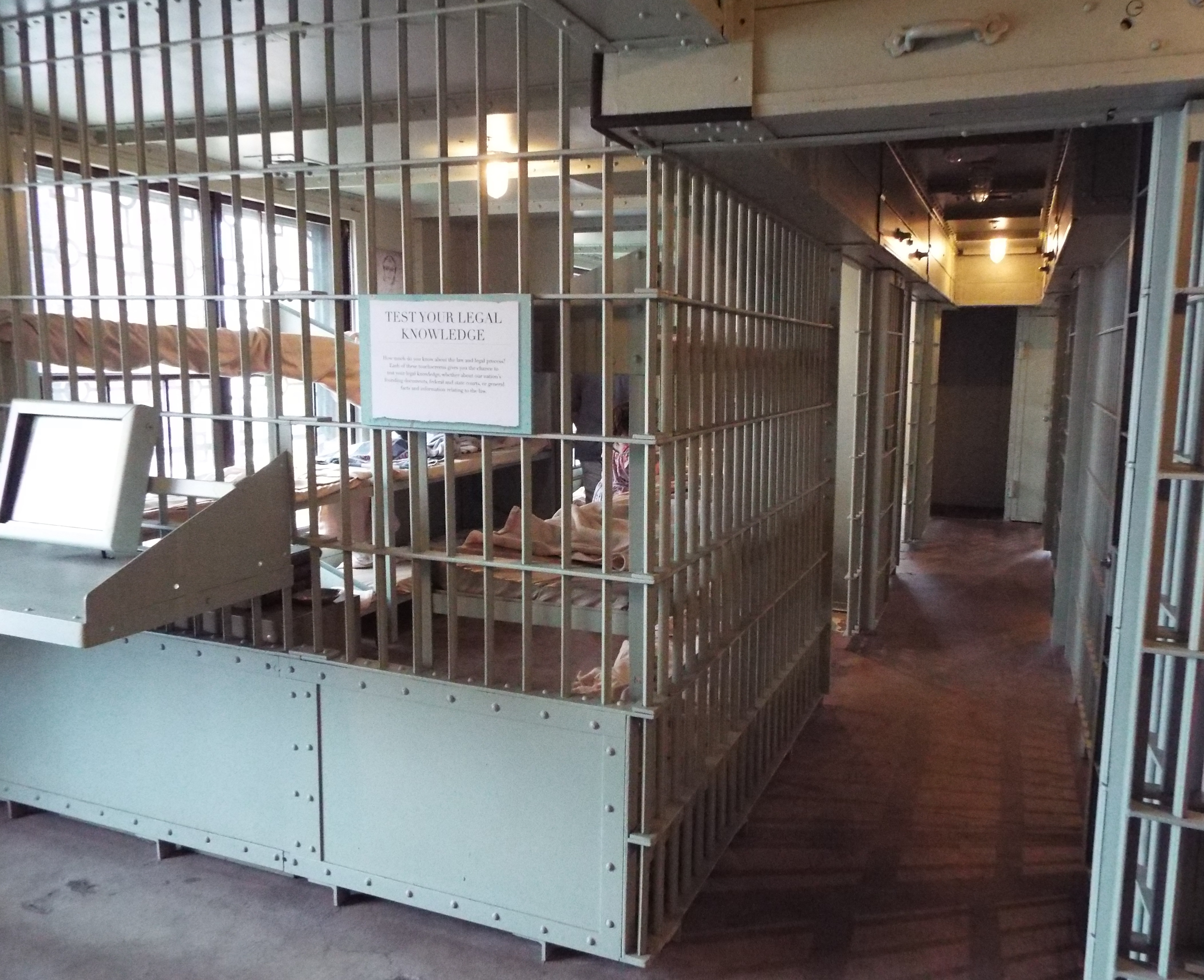
The old Maricopa County Courthouse, where Judd was imprisoned and her trial held.

Judd's trial began on January 19, 1932, at the Maricopa County Courthouse, with Judge Howard C. Speakman presiding. The dismemberment aspect of the double slaying was never addressed in court because Judd was tried only for the murder of LeRoi, whose body was not dismembered; she was never tried for the murder of Samuelson. The state argued that Judd acted with premeditation; that the relations between the three women had deteriorated over some weeks; and that they had argued over the affections of Halloran, all of which culminated in the murders. The prosecution maintained that Judd had herself inflicted the gunshot wound to her left hand to try to bolster her claim of self-defense. Judd's defense contended that she was innocent because she was insane, but did not introduce the self-defense argument for the record. Judd did not take the stand in her own defense.

The jury found Judd guilty of the first-degree murder of LeRoi on February 8. An appeal was unsuccessful. Judd was sentenced by Judge Speakman to be hanged February 17, 1933, and sent to Arizona State Prison in Florence, Arizona. This came despite sworn affidavits from four of the jurors claiming they only voted to recommend death after one of their fellow jurors, former Mesa mayor Dan Kleinman, persuaded them that it was the best way to get Judd to give up any accomplices in the murder. They urged Speakman to commute the sentence to life imprisonment.

Judd's attorneys uncovered evidence that Kleinman had already made up his mind that he would vote to convict Judd and send her to the gallows had he been on the jury. They lodged two appeals on this basis, arguing that Kleinman's behavior amounted to juror misconduct. However, neither of these appeals were successful. Judd's death sentence was overturned after a ten-day hearing found her mentally incompetent. Judd was then sent to Arizona State Asylum for the Insane on April 24, 1933.

== Jack Halloran ==
When it was discovered during the course of the trial that Halloran and Judd had been involved in an illicit affair, Halloran came under suspicion of complicity in the killings. He was indicted by a grand jury as an accomplice to murder on December 30, 1932, following new testimony from Judd. A preliminary hearing on the charge against Halloran was held in mid-January 1933, with Judd appearing as the star witness. In testimony that lasted almost three days, an emotional Judd told her story, saying

I am going to be hanged for something Jack Halloran is responsible for ... I was convicted of murder, but I shot in self-defense. Jack Halloran removed every bit of evidence. He is responsible for me going through all this. He is guilty of anything I am guilty of.

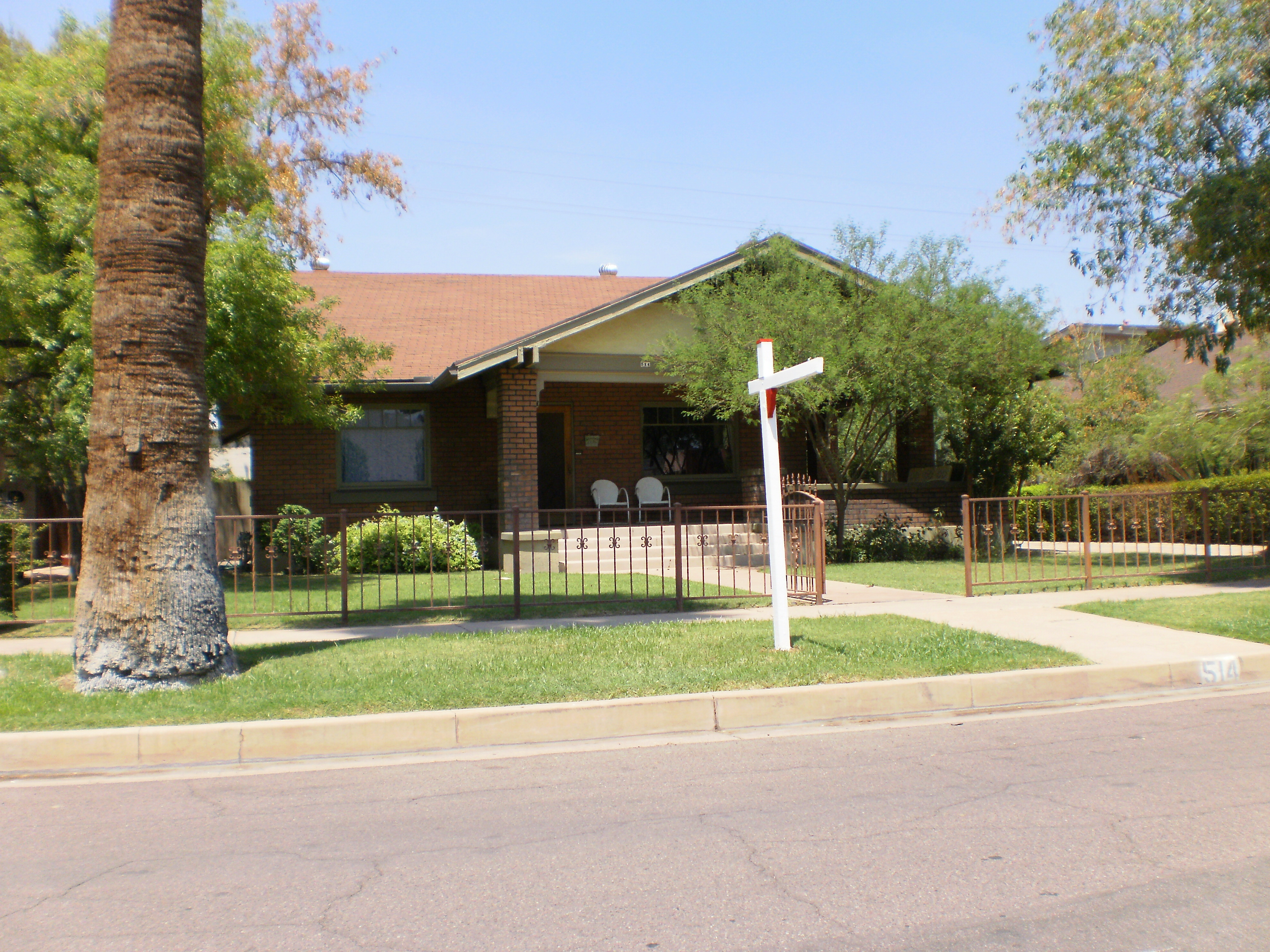
J.J. "Jack" Halloran's home as seen in 2010

Judd testified she had gone to LeRoi and Samuelson's bungalow on an invitation to play bridge, and a fourth woman who had also been invited had already left. She testified that there was an argument about Judd's introduction of Halloran to another woman, and that she killed LeRoi and Samuelson in self-defense after they physically attacked her. According to Judd, she met up with Halloran shortly after the killings and returned with him to the bungalow. After seeing the bodies, he went out to the garage, returned with a "great, heavy trunk" and told her not to tell anyone. Under cross-examination, Judd admitted repacking Samuelson's dismembered body in a trunk and other luggage two days after the murders.

Halloran did not take the stand in his own defense. His attorney told the court that Judd's story was nothing more "than the story of an insane person" and argued that since she had testified that the two women were killed in self-defense, there was, in fact, no crime committed; therefore Halloran could not be tried for anything. Halloran's attorney then asked for the charges against his client to be dismissed. On January 25, 1933, the judge freed Halloran, saying that the state's case was inconsistent, and that trying him would be "an idle gesture". Although officially exonerated, Halloran eventually fell out of favor in Phoenix, losing his business associates and social status. He died in Phoenix in 1976.

== Escapes and parole ==
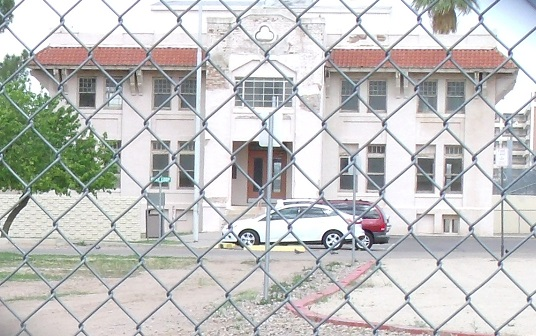
The Arizona State Hospital Building is where Judd was committed.

After her death sentence was overturned, Judd was committed to the Arizona State Asylum for the Insane (later renamed the Arizona State Hospital) in Phoenix, the state's only mental institution. Judd escaped from the institution six times between 1933 and 1963, in one instance walking all the way to Yuma, along the old Southern Pacific railroad tracks. In 1952, Governor J. Howard Pyle formally commuted Judd's sentence to life in prison.

Judd escaped for the final time on October 8, 1963, using a key to the front door of the hospital that a friend had given her. She ended up in the San Francisco Bay Area, where she became a live-in maid for a wealthy family living in a mansion overlooking the bay, using the name "Marian Kane". After six years, her identity in California was eventually discovered and she was taken back to Arizona on August 18, 1969.

Judd hired famed San Francisco defense attorney Melvin Belli, who in turn hired Larry Debus to handle her case. Governor Jack Williams of Arizona agreed to sign for Judd's release as long as the meeting was kept "hush, hush". However, in the following days, Belli called a press conference calling for Judd's immediate release, forcing Debus to fire Belli. On October 26, 1971, Arizona Governor Jack Williams commuted Judd's sentence to make her eligible for parole after she was recommended for clemency by the Arizona Board of Pardons and Parole. Judd was paroled and released on December 22, 1971. In 1983, the state of Arizona issued her an "absolute discharge," meaning she was no longer a parolee. Judd returned to California to work for the family that had previously employed her, later lived in Stockton, California, and then went back to Phoenix a few years before her death where she died on October 23, 1998, at the age of 93, sixty-seven years to the day from her surrender to the LAPD in 1931.

== Subsequent investigations ==
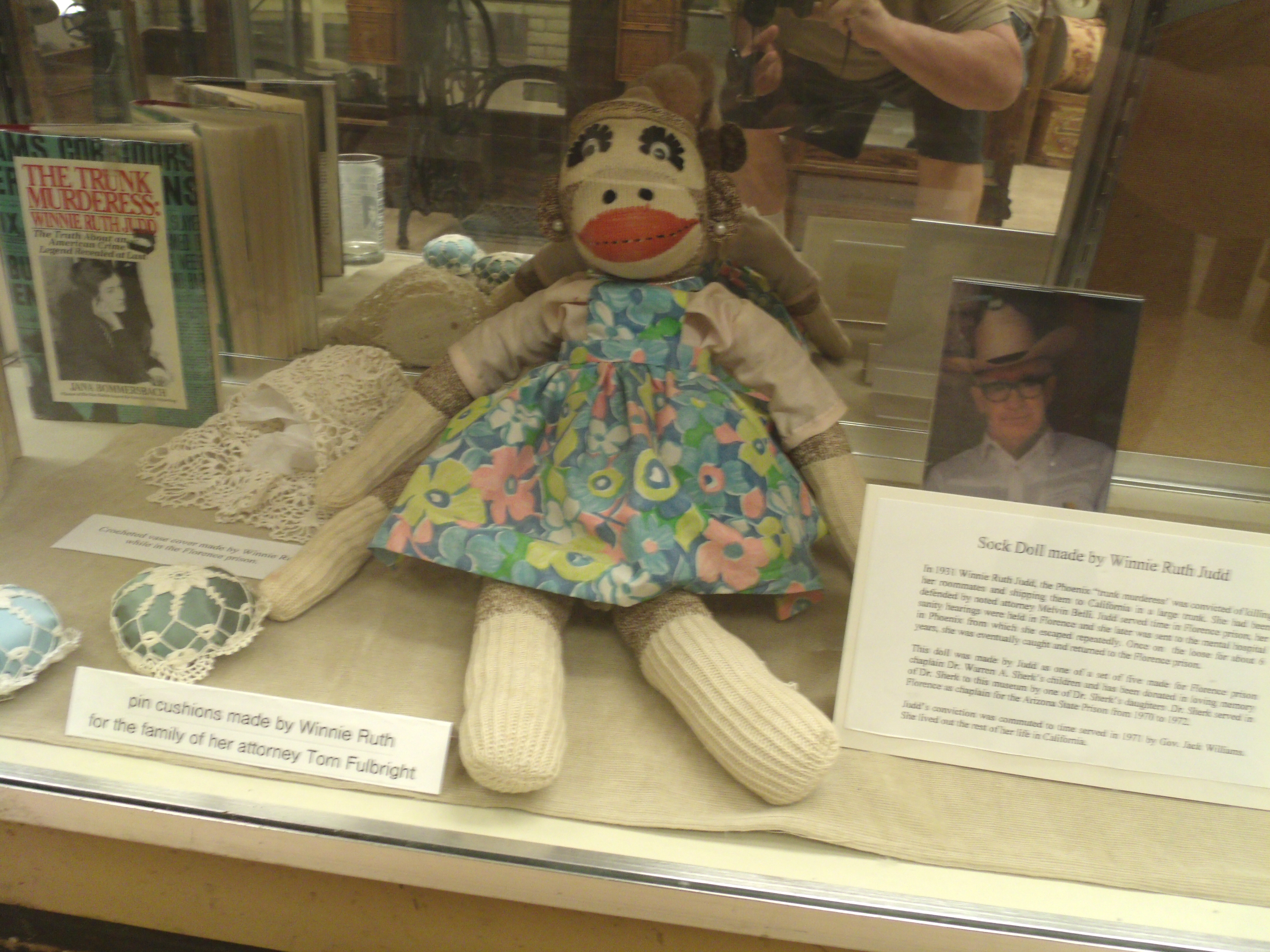
Doll made by Winnie Ruth Judd while imprisoned in the Arizona State Prison.

=== Jana Bommersbach investigation ===
Investigative journalist Jana Bommersbach re-examined Judd's case for a series of articles in the Phoenix New Times and a later book, The Trunk Murderess: Winnie Ruth Judd (Simon & Schuster, 1992). As part of her investigation, Bommersbach interviewed Judd herself. Bommersbach concluded that the police and prosecution were biased against Judd, and uncovered evidence that suggested she was innocent. She also faulted the press for its coverage of the trial. Bommersbach wrote that crime reporters of the day frequently acted as “judge and jury,” and covered high-profile trials in a way that would be considered "supermarket sleaze" today. She argued that the press helped create such an atmosphere of prejudice that Judd could not have possibly gotten a fair trial.

According to Bommersbach, due to Phoenix's small population in 1931 (just over 48,000 people), members of the Phoenix police knew Halloran well, and were aware of his associates, friends, and girlfriends. Some police officers also knew the victims. Some even believed that Judd hadn't killed anyone, even in self-defense, but was only covering up for Halloran and possibly others. Halloran's release was considered by some to be a miscarriage of justice, and his exoneration a political cover-up. His gray Packard had been spotted at the crime scene the night of the murders and again the next day, suggesting that he might have been an accomplice.

External videos
- You can watch and listen to a 2007 documentary about Winnie Ruth Judd titled Winnie Ruth Judd – Arizona Stories Full Version featuring Jana Bommersbach here

According to Bommersbach, there were indications that Judd was not capable of dismembering Samuelson's body – a task that, according to autopsy photos, was performed with surgical skills that Judd did not possess – and that Judd was not even physically capable of lifting the bodies. Bommersbach also suggested that a second gun might have been involved, based on early newspaper reports that LeRoi was shot with a larger caliber bullet.

Addressing the possibility that a person who possessed surgical skills dissected Samuelson's body, Bommersbach wrote about a nurse named Ann Miller, whom she interviewed for her book. Miller said that, while she was working at the Arizona State Hospital in 1936, Judd had confided to her that a Dr. Brown had come to see her while she was in prison and told her he was going to confess everything. Later, after Miller told a Phoenix attorney of Judd's story, he stated, "I'm sure she told you that. Dr. Brown came up to my office and wanted to tell the whole story. He made an appointment for the next week, but he died the day before the appointment." Brown died in June 1932 of heart disease at the age of 44. According to Bommersbach, some speculate he might have been contemplating suicide, writing, "As the New York Mirror reported the day Halloran's indictment was announced: 'A second man would probably have been indicted, according to widespread rumor, if death had not intervened. Mrs. Judd's story included the declaration that a physician, who has since committed suicide, was summoned to the murder bungalow to aid in the disposal of the bodies.'"

Bommersbach also asked former Arizona Supreme Court Chief Justice Jack D. H. Hays to review the trial and appeals process. Hays believed that the trial testimony didn't reveal nearly enough evidence of premeditation on Judd's part, leading him to conclude that if not for Kleinman, Judd would have been convicted of no worse than second-degree murder. He also believed Speakman should have given the jury the option of finding that Judd acted in self-defense, citing "evidence presented at the trial to support self-defense." According to Hays, even if the defense doesn't argue self-defense, "there's an obligation on the judge's part" to leave that option open to the jury when evidence of self-defense is presented. Even without this to consider, Hays believed that Judd should have gotten a new trial because of Kleinman's behavior, which he believed amounted to juror misconduct and jury tampering. However, Bommersbach's conclusions and her objectivity in view of the personal relationship she formed with Judd have been questioned by others who have studied the case.

=== 1933 "confession letter" ===
The 2014 discovery of a "confession letter", written in April 1933 in Judd's own hand to her attorney H.G. Richardson, raised new questions about her case. In the letter, which Judd called her "first and only confession," she stated that she alone planned and carried out the murder of LeRoi, with whom she was allegedly competing for Halloran's affections. She further stated that she had not planned to kill Samuelson, but did so after Samuelson, alerted by the gunshot that killed LeRoi, walked in on the murder scene and began fighting with Judd. Judd wrote that she also acted alone in handling and transporting the bodies. According to a New Times article by Robert Pela, Richardson suppressed the letter because it contradicted the substance of an appeal he had just filed in her case. After Richardson's death, Judd wrote to his widow repeatedly asking for return of the letter, for fear it would jeopardize hearings on her sanity and potential release from Arizona State Hospital, but Richardson's widow refused. In 2002, a few years after Judd's death, the letter was anonymously donated to the Arizona state archives.

Those who have studied or been involved in the Judd case differ in their interpretation of the letter. While some believe it is a true confession, it has also been interpreted as an attempt by Judd to bolster her insanity defense, clear Halloran, or even incriminate Halloran by admitting to a crime to which he could then be named an accessory – a strategy not possible if Judd contended that she had killed in self-defense. J. Dwight Dobkins, the co-author of the first book written about the Judd case, Winnie Ruth Judd: The Trunk Murders (Grosset & Dunlap, 1973), dismissed the letter as "just another of her many confessions, the one attempt to have Halloran named as an accomplice."

== In popular culture ==
In 1934 radio producer-director William Robson created a dramatic rendering of the crime for an episode of Calling all Cars entitled the Ruth Judd Case, which was introduced by then LAPD chief James E. Davis. The 32 minute program aired on the Don Lee network on September 9 and was sponsored by the Rio Grande oil company. Tobe Hooper and Kim Henkel – director and writer of The Texas Chain Saw Massacre, respectively – wrote a fictionalized account of the Judd story in 1975 in a screenplay titled Bleeding Hearts. The project, however, never came to fruition. In 2007, a feature-length film about the case, entitled Murderess: The Winnie Ruth Judd Story, was released. It was written and directed by Los Angeles filmmaker Scott Coblio, and featured an all-marionette cast.

Since its debut, the film has played annually at Phoenix's Trunk Space theater on October 16, the date of the original crime. While there are a number of fictitious films and books in existence which model themselves loosely upon the Judd's story, to date, Murderess remains the only feature-length film to tell it in a non-fiction framework. The Trunk Murders were featured in a 2009 episode of the true crime television series Deadly Women entitled "Hearts of Darkness" (Season 3, Episode 6). The 2009 novel Bury Me Deep by Megan Abbott is based on the Judd case.

The October 31, 1939 issue of the Los Angeles Examiner, which prominently features a headline regarding Judd's surrender to LAPD, can be found in the queue areas of all versions of The Twilight Zone: Tower of Terror, at Disney's Hollywood Studios, Walt Disney Studios Park, and the now-defunct version at Disney California Adventure.

The 2015 art installation "Tiger Lady", by Darren Clark and Gary Patch, is a shadow cast kinetic projection on permanent display at the Valley Bar in Phoenix. It features select milestones from the Judd saga.

In February 2024, a stage play by Cathy Dresbach and Ben Tyler titled ''The Truth About Winnie Ruth Judd'' was produced by The Phoenix Theatre Company. This play looks at the case from the public's point of view and the exploitation of the case by the media. Radio station KOY turns the trial into a radio drama, spearheaded by then radio announcer, Jack Williams. The radio program became an early manifestation of what would later become True Crime Podcasts. The 2024 book by Laurie Notaro entitled The Murderess tells the story of Judd's crimes. It is considered a work of fiction, but it is based on these events.

== See also ==
- List of United States death row inmates
