= Up Syndrome =

2001 film

- Directed by: Duane Graves
- Written by: Duane Graves
- Produced by: Duane Graves; Justin Meeks
- Starring: Rene Moreno
- Cinematography: Duane Graves
- Edited by: Duane Graves
- Music by: Rene Moreno; Derek Lacey
- Distributed by: CineClix
- Release dates: January 2001 (Slamdance); April 14, 2009 (Netflix)
- Running time: 82 minutes
- Country: United States
- Language: English

Up Syndrome is a 2001 American documentary directed by Duane Graves. It was picked up for distribution by CineClix shortly after its world premiere at the 2001 Slamdance Film Festival in Park City, Utah, and made available in the US via Amazon Prime. Its director and subject, both lifelong friends, took home the National Media Award from the National Down Syndrome Congress in 2002. The film was selected to join the permanent archives of the United States Library of Congress in 2009.

== Plot ==
Using donated digital tapes and a camera purchased with money earned from an eBay sale, indie filmmaker Duane Graves chronicles a year in the life of his charismatic childhood chum, Rene Moreno, who was born with Down syndrome. After graduating from a high school for special students in San Antonio, TX, Moreno sets out to make his way in the adult world, optimistically battling the prejudices his condition engenders.

== Cast ==
Actor	Role
Rene Moreno	Himself

== Reception ==
The Austin Film Society provided grant support for distribution of the film. Later, a shortened 24-minute version of the documentary won the grand prize at film director Kevin Smith's Movies Askew contest in 2006. Scott Foundas of Daily Variety described the film as an "exceedingly playful and refreshingly unsentimental portrait" that does not fully explore its subject matter. Foundas concluded that it is "touching, but one-note filmmaking". Film Threat's Merle Bertrand states that it is "engaging...a memorable experience." Peter Debruge of The Austin Chronicle calls it "a tender and touching character study". IndieWIRE critic Richard Baimbridge wrote, "it's one of the best portrait docs I have seen." Shari Crall of The Californian writes, "I gained a new perspective."

Duane Graves and Rene Moreno won the National Media Award from the National Down Syndrome Congress in 2002.
