= Butcher Boys =

- Directed by: Duane Graves; Justin Meeks
- Written by: Kim Henkel
- Produced by: Kim Henkel; Ian Henkel; Patrick Cassidy
- Starring: Ali Faulkner; Johnny Walter; Derek Lee Nixon; Tory Taranova; Gregory Kelly; Phillip Wolf; Matt Hensarling; Sonny Carl Davis; Jack Lee; Tom Byrne; Tank Turner; Justin Meeks; Tony Wolford
- Cinematography: Ricardo Diaz
- Edited by: Duane Graves
- Music by: Josh Morrow
- Distributed by: Phase 4 Films (North America)
- Release date: August 4, 2012 (Fantasia International Film Festival)
- Running time: 86 minutes
- Country: United States
- Language: English

Butcher Boys is a 2012 American horror cannibal film written and produced by Kim Henkel, who co-created 1974's The Texas Chain Saw Massacre with Tobe Hooper. The film was directed by Duane Graves and Justin Meeks. It was originally titled Boneboys.

The film was picked up by Phase 4 Films shortly after its world premiere at the 2012 Fantasia International Film Festival, and later made its US premiere at the 2012 Austin Film Festival. Phase 4 Films released the movie in theaters on September 6, 2013, under the tagline "You Are What You Eat." In 2016, PopHorror named it one of the "Top 10 Cannibal Themed Horror Movies of the 21st Century."

== Plot ==
A group of Texas youths are celebrating a birthday at a posh San Antonio restaurant when they cross paths with a ravenous clan of cannibals called the Boneboys. Mercilessly stalked through the darkened streets of the city, the young revelers must fight back against their attackers with sheer ferocity in order to avoid having their bodies defiled, and their flesh devoured. Butcher Boys is described as an updating of Jonathan Swift's 1729 satirical essay A Modest Proposal, which suggested poor people sell their children to the rich as food. Writer Kim Henkel imagined the descendants of folks who actually took Swift up on his proposal.

== Cast ==
- Ali Faulkner as Sissy
- Johnny Walter as "Bossboy"
- Derek Lee Nixon as Benny
- Tory Taranova as Barbie
- Gregory Kelly as "Amphead"
- Phillip Wolf as Mikey
- Matt Hensarling as Kenny
- Sonny Carl Davis as Carl Wayne
- Jack Lee as Buddy
- Tom Byrne as "Doc"
- Tank Turner as Ollie
- Justin Meeks as Caesar
- Tony Wolford as "Ton"
- Katie Patterson as Rachel

== Production ==
Kim Henkel originally wrote Butcher Boys in 2008 as a modern sequel to 1974's The Texas Chain Saw Massacre, which he co-created with Tobe Hooper. He later re-wrote Butcher Boys as a standalone film. Richard Whittaker of The Austin Chronicle wrote, "...a cannibal film, loosely adapted from Jonathan Swift's A Modest Proposal, in rural Texas? Hard not to see the connection."

Production took place in both Austin and San Antonio. It was directed and edited by two of Henkel's previous film students, Duane Graves and Justin Meeks, with whom he had collaborated in 2009 on the Bigfoot horror feature The Wild Man of the Navidad.

== Reception ==
On the review aggregator website Rotten Tomatoes, 0% of 5 critics' reviews are positive, with an average rating of 2.4/10.

Reviews of the movie were polarized. Bloody Disgusting described it as "tainted meat you've tasted before." Evan Saathoff of Birth. Movies. Death. described it as "a strange, misguided film." ComingSoon.net explained "this is one of those films that will split people right down the middle. It may have nothing to offer some and others may find its madness exhilarating. The performances are certainly unhinged and played to perfection." Joel Harley of Horror DNA wrote "it's brutal, gory and disarmingly amusing, Butcher Boys is a fun film by The Texas Chain Saw Massacre's less remembered co-creator and two exciting new directors." DVD Exotica proclaimed "Butcher Boys is not an official TCM movie in name. But it is absolutely, 100% the next chapter in the story." While Outlaw Vern concluded, "it's worth completist viewing for Chainsaw series fanatics like myself."
