= Jana Bommersbach =

American journalist and author (1945–2024)

Jana Bommersbach (December 5, 1945 – July 17, 2024) was an American journalist and author.

== Life and career ==
Bommersbach was born in Fargo, North Dakota. She graduated from the University of North Dakota and the University of Michigan. In 1972, she moved to Arizona and started to work as a journalist.

In 2012, she worked on the television program profiling historic Arizona characters Outrageous Arizona along with Marshall Trimble.

Bommersbach worked for Phoenix New Times and the Arizona Republic.

Bommersbach died July 17, 2024, at the age of 78.

== Books ==
- Funeral Hotdish
- The Trunk Murderess: Winnie Ruth Judd (about Winnie Ruth Judd)
- Cattle Kate: A Mystery
