= Allen Danziger =

American actor

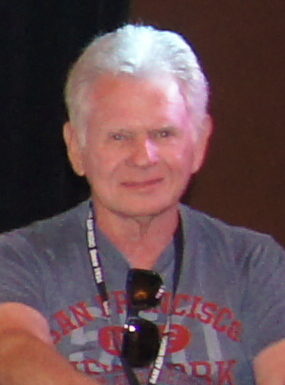
- Danziger at the TCM panel at Days of the Dead Indianapolis 2012
- Born: 1942 (age 83–84); New York City, New York, U.S.
- Education: City College of New York; University of Texas at Austin
- Occupations: Actor; social worker
- Years active: 1969–2013, 2022
- Children: 1

Allen Danziger (born 1942) is an American former actor, best known for his role as Jerry in The Texas Chain Saw Massacre (1974).

== Early life ==
Danziger was born and raised in The Bronx, New York City. He graduated from the Bronx High School of Science before enrolling at City College of New York. After graduating with a degree in psychology in 1964, he enrolled at the University of Texas at Austin, where he began studying for a master's degree in social psychology.

== Career ==
While residing in Austin, Danziger was introduced to Tobe Hooper through his downstairs neighbor, film editor Sallye Richardson. Hooper cast Danziger in his debut feature film, Eggshells (1969). After completing the film, Danziger began a career as a social worker. Several years later, Hooper again offered him the role of Jerry in The Texas Chain Saw Massacre (1974), marking his second film role.

Following The Texas Chainsaw Massacre, Danzinger retired from acting for 48 years until his casting as the narrator for the 2022 horror-comedy Cannibal Comedian.

Danziger has owned "Three Ring Service," an entertainment company, since 1978. The company provides entertainment for corporate events and parties. He participated in a documentary on The Texas Chain Saw Massacre, for the movie's DVD release.

Allen's current project is perfecting Chainsaw Jerry's Beef Jerky. "A Cut Above the Rest"

== Personal life ==
Danziger has one son.

== Partial filmography ==
- Eggshells (1969) - Allen
- The Texas Chain Saw Massacre (1974) - Jeremiah "Jerry" Huberman
- Storage Locker (2022) - Kirby Leto
- Cannibal Comedian (2022) - The Narrator
