= Carter Roy =

American actor

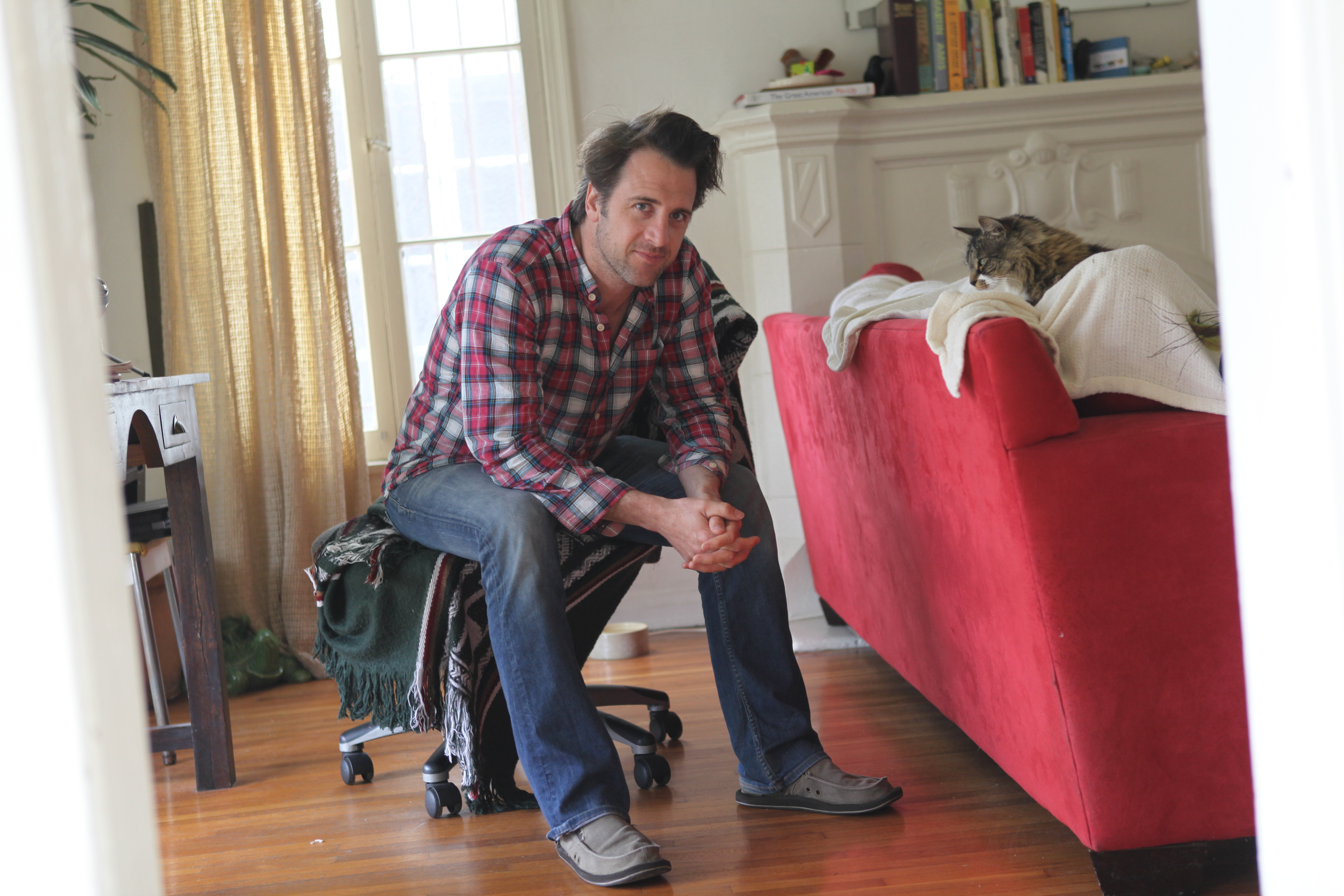
- Born: Bozeman, Montana, United States
- Occupations: Actor, comedian, writer, producer
- Years active: 2000–present
- Website: carterroy.com

Carter Roy is an American actor, comedian, writer and producer based in Los Angeles.

== Career ==
=== Theater ===
Carter Roy moved to New York City in September 2001. While studying improv at Upright Citizens Brigade he joined the cast of the sketch group Assorted States and Clean Living, which included Jack McBrayer and Lennon Parnham. Manhattan Theatre Club invited him to be a part of their in-house reading series, which included reads with the likes of Christopher Walken, Martin Short, Jeff Daniels and Marcia Gay Harden, which led to him being cast in MTC's Broadway production of Translations. In 2002, Roy received critical acclaim for his portrayal of John Cusack, the central narrator in Who Killed Woody Allen?

=== Television ===
Roy's first tv job was a small recurring role as a bartender on As The World Turns. He has since appeared in shows on networks such as NBC, ABC, and HBO.

=== Comedy ===
As a comedian, Roy performed frequently on VH1: All Access.

=== Web series ===
Roy is the lead actor in The cult hit Killin’ It! with Paul Crik and the award-winning (LA Web Series Festival and LA Comedy Festival) sitcom series Me Plus U.

=== Film ===
In 2013, Roy was the lead in the independent horror movie Refuge, and in 2014 starred in the award-winning feature film The Umbrella Man.

In 2016, Roy starred in the movie Found Footage 3D and had the lead role as Derek; the film was rated 100% on Rotten Tomatoes.

=== Podcasts ===
Roy hosts the podcast Solved Murders: True Crime Mysteries together with his friend and voice teacher Wenndy Mackenzie. He also hosts Historical Figures, Hostage and Conspiracy Theories on the Parcast Network. Roy also hosts Crime House Network's Murder: True Crime Stories.
