= The Song (2014 film) =

- Theatrical release poster
- Directed by: Richard Ramsey
- Written by: Richard Ramsey
- Produced by: Shane Sooter
- Starring: Alan Powell; Ali Faulkner; Caitlin Nicol-Thomas; Danny Vinson; Gary Jenkins; Aaron Benward; Kenda Benward; Jude Ramsey
- Cinematography: Kevin Bryan
- Edited by: Jared Hardy
- Music by: Vince Emmett
- Production company: City on a Hill Studios
- Distributed by: Samuel Goldwyn Films
- Release date: September 26, 2014
- Running time: 116 minutes
- Country: United States
- Language: English
- Box office: $1 million

The Song is a 2014 American romantic drama film written and directed by Richard Ramsey. The film follows about a singer-songwriter, whose marriage suffers when the song he wrote for his wife propels him to stardom. The film was inspired by the Song of Songs and the life of Solomon.

== Plot ==
Jed King is the son of successful country music legend, David King. Jed meets Rose, the daughter of a vineyard owner, and marries her. He writes a song about her that propels him to stardom. Conflict arises when King becomes involved with Shelby Bale, a free-spirited young musician who is on tour with him. King’s career and marriage begin a downward spiral as a result of his choices and the film chronicles his struggles.

== Cast ==
- Alan Powell as Jed King
- Ali Faulkner as Rose
- Caitlin Nicol-Thomas as Shelby
- Danny Vinson as Shep Jordan
- Aaron Benward as David King
- Kenda Benward as Bethany King
- Jude Ramsey as Ray King
- Gary Jenkins as Stan
- Landon Marshall as Eddie

Casting Notes:

- Alan Powell is co-founder of Anthem Lights.
- Aaron (David King) and Kenda Benward (Bethany) are married in real life as well, and parents of Luke Benward.
