= Duane Graves =

American film director, screenwriter, and editor

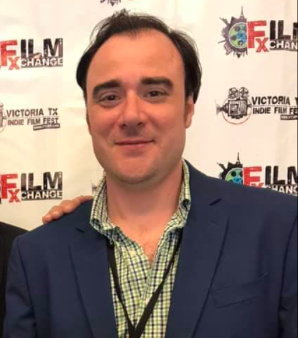
- Duane Graves at the 2019 Victoria TX Indie Film Festival.
- Born: San Antonio, Texas, United States
- Occupations: Film director, screenwriter, editor
- Years active: 2000–present

Duane Graves is an American film director, writer, producer, cinematographer and editor who has produced a body of work spanning multiple genres. In 2023, Deadline Hollywood announced he was named one of Coverfly's best up and coming screenwriters. His career began with the documentary Up Syndrome, which premiered at the Slamdance Film Festival in 2001. A portrait of his childhood friend born with Down syndrome, Up Syndrome won numerous awards, including the National Media Award from the National Down Syndrome Congress in 2002, and the Grand Prize at the 2006 Movies Askew Film Festival hosted by Clerks (film) director Kevin Smith. He formed Greeks Films with film school peer, actor and filmmaking partner Justin Meeks in 2001.

Graves then co-wrote/co-directed his first narrative film with Meeks, The Wild Man of the Navidad, a 70's-inspired creature feature based on real-life journals and starring Meeks. The film premiered at the 2008 Tribeca Film Festival and later Fantastic Fest, before being released internationally by IFC Films in 2009, and again in 2021 by MPI Media Group.

In 2011, Graves and partner Meeks were two of 26 Austin filmmakers selected - including Jay Duplass, Bob Byington, Ben Steinbauer, David Zellner and others - to remake Richard Linklater's acclaimed 1991 debut feature Slacker (film). Graves and Meeks' segment in the Slacker 2011 anthology was photographed in the same location and with the same actress some twenty years after the original.

Graves' sophomore effort - the cannibal-themed horror Butcher Boys (2012 film) - was written and produced by Kim Henkel, co-creator of the original The Texas Chain Saw Massacre (1974), and loosely based on Jonathan Swift's satirical 1729 essay A Modest Proposal. It debuted at the 2012 Fantasia International Film Festival under the original moniker Boneboys, before being released in North America as Butcher Boys by Phase 4 Films in 2013.

Graves then served as editor for the award-winning short film Black Metal, written and directed by Kat Candler. Black Metal, about a husband, father and musician struggling with the guilt and blame of a tragic and senseless murder, premiered at the 2013 Sundance Film Festival, as well as the 2013 SXSW Film Festival.

Also in 2013, Graves co-wrote/co-directed the horror Western Kill or Be Killed (2015 film), also starring partner Meeks and featuring genre icons Michael Berryman, Pepe Serna, Edwin Neal, and Luce Rains. Originally titled Red on Yella, Kill a Fella, it premiered at the 2015 Dallas International Film Festival before being acquired by RLJE Films for wide release in 2016.

Most recently, Graves and Meeks served as executive producers of Dane Sears's The Hopewell Haunting, a period ghost story released in 2023 by MPI Media Group/Dark Sky Films. In 2024, MPI Media Group also re-released Graves' debut feature Up Syndrome with updated footage for its 25th anniversary.

Graves is currently based in Austin, Texas.

== Bio ==
Duane Graves grew up in San Antonio, Texas. He attended The University of Texas at Austin and Texas A&M University–Corpus Christi.

== Notable filmography (as director, producer, or editor) ==
- Up Syndrome (feature documentary) (2000)
- Headcheese (short) (2001)
- Voltagen (short) (2002)
- Rio Peligroso (short) (2004)
- The Hypostatic Union (short) (2005)
- The Wild Man of the Navidad (narrative feature) (2008)
- Slacker 2011 (directed segment) (2011)
- Butcher Boys (2012 film) (narrative feature) (2013)
- Black Metal at IMDb (short, editor) (2013)
- Kill or Be Killed (2015 film) (narrative feature) (2016)
- Melontana (short documentary) (2020)
- The Hopewell Haunting at IMDb (narrative feature) (2023)
