= Ali Faulkner =

American actress

- Born: 11 March 1986 (age 39); West Plains, Missouri, U.S.
- Occupation: Actress
- Years active: 2008–present

Ali Faulkner is an American actress. She is best known for playing Sissy in the horror film Butcher Boys and Rose in the romantic drama film The Song.

== Early life ==
Faulkner was born and raised in West Plains, Missouri.

== Career ==
Early on in her career, Faulkner made appearances in various movies such as the horror film Butcher Boys and the comedy film Bad Kids Go to Hell. Faulkner became known to a wider audience after playing Bianca in The Twilight Saga: Breaking Dawn – Part 1. Her biggest role so far was playing Rose in the romantic drama The Song. Faulkner also plays the violin and occasionally is a singer. She has been called a rising star by Yahoo

== Personal life ==
Faulkner is currently engaged. She is a big believer in God.

== Filmography ==
=== Film ===
Year	Title	Role	Notes
2008	Between Heaven and Hell	Paige White	
2008	Suitable for Murder	Samantha Baines	
2009	Mia's Father	Mia Williams	
2009	Maggie's Passage	Maggie Sirron	
2011	The Twilight Saga: Breaking Dawn – Part 1	Bianca	
2011	Humans vs Zombies	Angie	
2012	Bad Kids Go to Hell	Tricia Wilkes	
2012	Butcher Boys	Sissy	
2013	The Secret Village	Rachel	
2013	The Education of Eddie and Mortimer	Becca	
2014	The Song	Rose Jordan King	
2018	T For Taj Mahal	Janet Wright	
2023	Stars Fell Again	Harper Belle	

=== Television ===
Year	Title	Role	Notes
2012	Reel Dudes	Heather	2 episodes
2014	Killer Women	Kiki Birdsong	Episode; In and Out
2016	Major Crimes	Julie	Episode; Off the Wagon
