= Bad Kids Go to Hell =

- Movie poster
- Directed by: Matthew Spradlin
- Written by: Matthew Spradlin; Barry Wernick
- Based on: Bad Kids Go 2 Hell by: Barry Wernick; Matthew Spradlin
- Produced by: Barry Wernick; Brad Keller
- Starring: Amanda Alch; Marc Donato; Augie Duke; Roger Edwards; Ali Faulkner; Cameron Deane Stewart; Chanel Ryan; Wendy Tobias; Ben Browder; Judd Nelson
- Cinematography: David H. Blood
- Edited by: Justin Wilson
- Music by: Brian Flores
- Production companies: BKGTH Productions; Bad Kids; Spiderwood Studios
- Distributed by: Phase 4 Films
- Release dates: December 7, 2012 (United States and Canada)
- Running time: 92 minutes
- Country: United States
- Language: English

Bad Kids Go to Hell is a 2012 American black comedy thriller film directed by Matthew Spradlin, who co-wrote it with Barry Wernick. Based on Spradlin and Wernick's graphic novel of the same name, the film stars Amanda Alch, Marc Donato, Augie Duke, Roger Edwards, Ali Faulkner, and Cameron Deane Stewart as six prep school students, who serve detention in a seemingly haunted school library. It had a limited theatrical release on October 27, 2012. On December 7, 2012, it was released nationwide. The film was also screened at various public destinations across the U.S.

== Plot ==
A SWAT team barges into a school library to find a student holding an axe and surrounded by savaged bodies, before the film goes back eight hours previously. Six unruly prep school students are forced to serve Saturday detention for eight hours at Crestview Academy, where psychologist Dr. Day conducts psychological testing on the students to examine their personalities and trigger their demeanors, recording each session in the process. When Headmaster Nash gives an expulsion notice to low-income student Matt Clark, Matt convinces him to change it to an eight-hour detention on Saturday. Matt serves the detention with the awkward Tarek Ahmed, the jock Craig Cook, the sly Goth girl Veronica Harmon, the prissy and asthmatic Megan McDurst, and the popular girl Tricia Wilkes.

For their detention, Dr. Day takes away their phones, restricts their internet reach, and gives them an assignment to write the school's history. He then locks the students alone in the school's new library, which has had some further remodeling by the janitor, Max, with his addition of Native American portraits and an Apache statue. The students believe the library is haunted. They realize they have mutually dysfunctional family lives, though they have their differences with each other, sparked from prior encounters which have been recorded on camera. Veronica hides Megan's inhaler and frames Tarek, leading to Megan having an asthma attack and dying.

With limited computer access to the school's databanks, Veronica begins work on their history project. They learn how land was stolen from an Apache tribe in the 1870s by General Andrew Winston Clarke, which was then taken over by the city of Crestview to build the school. The new library was built on neighboring land that belonged to recently deceased Apache elder Jacob Rainwater.

As the students argue on-and-off, they discover a vent that allows them to navigate to different rooms that are locked. They learn that Matt has an undisclosed criminal background and become suspicious of him. After Tarek goes missing and they return to the library through the vent, they learn that Tricia's mother is the governor, Craig's father is a city councilman, and Megan's father co-owns the (former Rainwater) property on which Tarek's father's company built the library, all of whom made an agreement with the school to ensure their spoiled kids would be guaranteed to graduate in exchange for gifting the library.

A dark storm rages outside the school, tampering with the lights and electronics inside, increasing the students’ fear that there is paranormal activity. Craig falls down the steps in the library and is staked by one of his crutches, dying instantly. Not long after, Tricia admits her mother was the reason why Rainwater lost his house, and Veronica secures evidence on Craig's camera showing that Tricia, Craig, Megan and Tarek had killed Jacob Rainwater at his home to vacate the ownership of the property, leaving no next of kin to take over. Deeply believing in the paranormal, they attempt to contact Jacob's spirit so that Tricia can call a truce, but the spirit rebels and seemingly harms Veronica. The spirit then appears, and Tricia uses a nail gun to commit suicide due to fright.

Dr. Day emerges to reveal his alliance with Veronica. The whole time, they masterminded everyone's paranormal delusions and emotional outbursts, triggered by psychological inkblots tests, all to sell the story and make money. Killed by Dr. Day for trying to escape through the vent, Tarek's dead body is what was used as the ghost. Before Veronica can shoot Matt using the nail gun, Dr. Day abruptly kills her with an axe for poisoning him and causing his diarrhea earlier. Matt is framed for all the murders, as an unexpected booby trap involving the statue severs Dr. Day's head, killing him. A SWAT team barges in to find Matt armed with an axe in the middle of the carnage. Matt is subdued, placed in a straitjacket and gagged.

Max the janitor arrives and removes crucial evidence, revealing he is related to Jacob Rainwater, and he was the one set the booby trap and framed Matt. In the closing credits, Matt is driven away in an ambulance and Tricia's mother and Tarek, Megan & Craig's fathers pay off Max in order to clear them of any involvement in the incident.

== Cast ==
- Cameron Deane Stewart as Matt Clark
- Augie Duke as Veronica Harmon
- Ali Faulkner as Tricia Wilkes
- Roger Edwards as Craig Cook
- Marc Donato as Tarek Ahmed
- Amanda Alch as Megan McDurst
- Jeffrey Schmidt as Dr. Day
- Ben Browder as Max
- Judd Nelson as Headmaster Nash
- Chanel Ryan as Ms. Gleason
- Eloise DeJoria as Governor Wilkes
- Íce Mrozek as Mr. Ahmed
- Rodney Johnson as Mr. Cook
- Wendy Tobias as Whoa Teacher

== Reception ==
On the review aggregator website Rotten Tomatoes, 44% of 9 critics' reviews are positive, with an average rating of 4.3/10. Metacritic, which uses a weighted average, assigned the film a score of 40 out of 100, based on 5 critics, indicating "mixed or average" reviews.

== Sequel ==
A sequel originally titled Bad Kids Go 2 Hell, now called Bad Kids of Crestview Academy, was released in theaters on January 13, 2017. The sequel features returning cast members like Cameron Deane Stewart and Ben Browder, along with new cast members like Drake Bell and Sammi Hanratty. Judd Nelson was replaced by Sean Astin as Headmaster Nash.
