= The Secret Village =

- Directed by: Swamy Kandan
- Written by: Swamy Kandan; Jason Whittier
- Produced by: Swamy Kandan
- Starring: Jonathan Bennett; Ali Faulkner; Richard Riehle; Stelio Savante
- Cinematography: Piero Basso
- Edited by: Christopher Holmes
- Music by: Robert Folk
- Production company: Midnight Friends
- Distributed by: SD Digital Creations
- Release date: October 25, 2013
- Running time: 89 minutes
- Country: United States
- Language: English

The Secret Village is a 2013 American psychological thriller directed by Swamy Kandan, written by Kandan and Jason Whittier, and starring Jonathan Bennett, Ali Faulkner, Richard Riehle, and Stelio Savante. It was filmed in the Berkshires, a hilly region of Massachusetts. Faulkner plays a reporter who investigates rumors of persistent ergot poisoning in an isolated, unfriendly town, only to find a plot that involves cults and modern day accusations of witchcraft. It premiered in October 2013 and was released on DVD in December 2013.

== Plot ==
Rachel, a reporter, is surprised when her roommate, Greg, arrives earlier than expected. Greg explains that his unsupportive ex-girlfriend has kicked him out, and he needs a place to stay while he works on his thriller screenplay. Both Greg and Rachel have been drawn to a small town in the Berkshires that is said to have been plagued with repeated cases of ergot poisoning. Greg wants to write a story about an insular town with a dark past, and Rachel believes that ergot poisoning can explain the accusations of witchcraft in the Salem witch trials. However, Rachel's questions upset the townspeople, who are tired of discussions about the town's history. Encouraged by Greg's faith in her, Rachel continues to dig deeper and ask more questions. Eventually, she meets Paul, a friendly townsperson who is willing to speak about the town's history, rumors of ergot poisoning, and a vague conspiracy that involves the town's elders. Paul urges Rachel to be careful, as there are dangerous secrets in the town that people will kill to protect. Unconvinced, Rachel proceeds with her investigation, only to find Paul dead.

When Greg disappears, Rachel becomes increasingly worried about her own safety. Her fears are realized when Joe and Jason, local townspeople who have stalked and harassed her, seemingly attempt to kidnap her. She sees Jason intentionally infect younger townspeople with ergot poisoning, and Jim, a friend of Paul's, shows her evidence that the town keeps these sick people imprisoned as suspected witches. Jim promises to show her further evidence of coverups and cult activity, and Rachel contacts her editor to receive more time to investigate these claims. Dubious of her reports, Rachel's editor insists that she stick to the original story and observe the deadline; instead, she works with Jim to expose the cult. When Greg suddenly reappears, she angrily accuses him of abandoning her and explains the danger that they are in. Greg attempts to calm her and suggests that they get dinner; Rachel reluctantly agrees. While she prepares, she sees Greg go through her research and hand it off to Joe. Hurt by this betrayal, she locks Greg out of the house and asks her skeptical editor to contact the police.

Undeterred, Rachel continues her investigations, and Jim takes her on a tour of the house where the town's cult keeps kidnapped victims of ergot poisoning. Before she can do anything to help them, she runs into Joe, who chases her down. Greg helps Joe hold her as Jason injects her with a syringe. Rachel once again tearfully accuses Greg of betrayal and falls unconscious. In the next scene, flashbacks reveal that Rachel has been suffering from ergot poisoning: Paul and Jim are hallucinations, Joe and Jason are concerned townspeople who have been trying to help Rachel, and Greg has agreed to take her to a specialist in New York. On the way to New York, Jim appears to her one last time, asking for her help, but she swallows a pill that causes him to disappear.

== Cast ==
- Ali Faulkner as Rachel
- Jonathan Bennett as Greg
- Richard Riehle as Paul
- Stelio Savante as Joe
- Karin Duseva as Mary
- Tobi Gadison as Jim
- Kef Lee as Jason
- Miriam Weisbecker as Alexa

== Production ==
The Secret Village was filmed in a hilly region of western Massachusetts called the Berkshires. The budget was under $200,000. Scouting took place in March 2012, and filming continued until mid-May 2012. One scene took place in New York City, and post-production took place in Los Angeles.

== Release ==
The Secret Village premiered locally in Pittsfield, Massachusetts, on October 25, 2013. It ran from October 25–28, and then had a limited release in New York, Pennsylvania, Florida, and California. Vertical Entertainment released it on DVD on December 17, 2013, and on video on demand on January 1, 2014.

== Reception ==
Brad McHargue of Dread Central rated it 1/5 stars and wrote, "I wish I could say something good about this film, but throughout its 90 minute run-time, I struggled with simply not turning it off. It's a chore to sit through, and has all the hallmarks of a film that wants to be more than it really is." Harvey Chartrand of Diabolique Magazine wrote that the film is too confusing, lacks suspense, and "does not frighten the viewer in the least." Mark L. Miller of Ain't It Cool News wrote that the film may be too confusing and offbeat for viewers who prefer traditional thrillers. Richardo Vaca of Independent Film Quarterly compared it to M. Night Shyamalan's The Village and wrote, "This is the film cult fans have been waiting for."
