= Bad Kids of Crestview Academy =

- Film poster
- Directed by: Ben Browder
- Screenplay by: Barry Wernick; James R. Hallam
- Story by: Barry Wernick
- Based on: Bad Kids Go 2 Hell by: Barry Wernick; Matthew Spradlin
- Produced by: James R. Hallam; Brad Keller; Barry Wernick
- Starring: Sammi Hanratty; Drake Bell; Sean Astin; Gina Gershon; Ben Browder
- Cinematography: Charles Schner
- Edited by: Matt Diezel
- Music by: Jeff Cardoni
- Production company: Bad Kids Productions
- Distributed by: Momentum Pictures
- Release date: January 13, 2017
- Running time: 100 minutes
- Country: United States
- Language: English

Bad Kids of Crestview Academy is a 2017 American action comedy thriller film directed by Ben Browder.

Academy is a sequel to Bad Kids Go to Hell (2012). The screenplay was written by Barry Wernick and James R. Hallam. Both Hell and Academy are based on Wernick and Matthew Spradlin's best-selling graphic novel Bad Kids Go 2 Hell (2009), which is about the stories of the Wildman and Calloway children at an evil prep school. Academy stars Sammi Hanratty, Colby Arps, Sophia Taylor Ali, Erika Daly, Matthew Frias, Sean Astin, Gina Gershon, Ben Browder, Sufe Bradshaw, and Cameron Deane Stewart.

== Overview ==
Wernick and Hallam had written the graphic novel Bad Kids Go to Hell (2009), which was turned into the film Bad Kids Go to Hell (2012), both telling the story of Matt Clark, a student at prestigious Crestview Academy, who is the only survivor of six students serving a weekend detention.

The story in Bad Kids of Crestview Academy (2012) takes place four years later, when another group of detention students are slaughtered. Browder reprises his role as Max the janitor, in addition to serving as director of the film. In an end-scene cameo, Cameron Deane Stewart reprises his role as Matt Clark, the main protagonist of the original film.

== Plot ==
A new class is now in session four years later. Siouxsie Hess (Sammi Hanratty), a blonde “Goth” called a "undercrust" by the seniors, is a sophomore at Crestview Academy and looking for any way to get into Saturday detention with the senior class. Seeking help from Ben, aka "The Naked Wizard" (Drake Bell), he tells her that it will be done by the time she gets to school.

At the Academy, she takes out her angst on the Headmaster Nash's (Sean Astin) car. Nash sends her to Dr. Knight (Sufe Bradshaw), a secretary who is in charge of corralling the youngsters and handing out their punishment. During their discussion, an email message from Nash directs Knight to send Siouxsie to Saturday detention.

At a drunken party for the senior class one night, Siouxsie’s older sister, Alison Hess (Ashlyn McEvers) is there. A member of the senior class and friend to each of the bad kids in detention, Alison was a investigative journalist who enjoyed reporting her findings on the school’s own Interweb. Alison was talking to Blaine when she mysteriously jumped off the roof to the street below, killing her. Not believing it was a suicide, Siouxsie’s life’s focus becomes to solve the mystery of her sister’s murder.

Serving detention this Saturday with Siouxsie are gay heartthrob "Latin Spice" Brian Marquez (Matthew Frias),"Cat Lover" Sara Hasegawa (Erika Daly), the "Preacher's Daughter" Faith Jackson (Sophia Taylor Ali), and "Mr. Clean" Blaine Wilkes (Colby Arps). The five arrive and are greeted by Nash, who confiscates their cellphones. Dr. Knight greets them and she goes on to say that all of the doors in the school now operate on a passcode. They arrive at the library and Knight enters the passcode, but the door does not unlock. She calls over janitor Max (Ben Browder) and he puts in the code. They do not gain entry and the gang remains locked out of the library while the janitor Max goes to the maintenance workshop to retrieve the list of codes. While they wait, Nash tells the detainees to take a restroom break. He then catches them a few minutes later in the same bathroom doing a lewd act. Siouxsie followed Max to the workshop and spies on Max. He then disappears, and Siouxsie takes the code sheet off the desk. She then sneaks back out, and she almost runs into Headmaster Nash who was with another female student, Ethel Balducci (Alexandra "Ali" Astin). Back at the library, Siouxsie asks Knight if they can speak alone. In a storage room, Siouxsie uses a stun gun on Knight and duct tapes her hands, arms, and feet. She leaves Knight, taking the bag with the cellphones with her. She uses the stolen code sheet to access the lecture hall and goes to a computer and plugs in the thumb drive Ben gave her and it opens a file which contains a virus. Hiding the bag and the stolen code sheet in a cabinet, she rejoins the other students. Max lets them into the lecture hall. While accessing the computer Sara discovers the virus, and after doing a line of coke, Brian freaks out over all of the feline videos being projected onto a screen in the lecture hall. Brian then falls ill and vomits, both stomach contents and blood, and he dies.

The virus causes the security system to go off, and the steel bars and lock gates descend over the doors and windows, trapping everyone inside. While Faith goes to the science lab in search of a chemical to help them escape, Sara sees Max at the garage door acting strange, and insects enter under the steel door and climb up his body. Max turns hid head and sees Sara. Siouxsie goes back to the storage room where Knight is trapped and checks in on her. Back at the lecture hall Siouxsie and Sara are checking video blog files, Sara tells Siouxsie about what happened to Alison the night of the party (told in a flashback scene), and how Faith and Sara wound up in detention. The four of them head to the industrial arts room. While getting a welding torch off a ladder, Siouxsie inadvertently pulls down a power saw that swings; everyone takes cover by a table with a power drill built in the table. Sara, who was lying on top of the table gets impaled by the drill, which powered up, and tore up her stomach, killing her.

Back at the lecture hall, Siouxsie and Blaine get into an argument. It is revealed that Blaine's sister was Tricia Wilkes (Ali Faulkner), who was killed four years earlier, and he was getting revenge for her murder, with backing from his mother, Senator Wilkes (Gina Gershon). He also reveals that he pushed Alison over the railing at the party, poisoned Brian and turned on the power for the drill that killed Sara. Faith enters, and Blaine tries to pin the murders on Siouxsie. Siouxsie goes to the cabinet to show Faith where she hid the cellphones; the bag is missing with the dead body of Ben falling out. She then leads Faith and Blaine to the closet where she had Knight duct taped and locked in, only to reveal Knight was decapitated. Faith, now starting to believe Siouxsie over what Blaine said about his sister, and Siouxsie try to jump Blaine, who manages to knock both of them out. Siouxsie wakes up and sees Faith lying on the floor in the auto shop, with her hair tied around Blaine's car rim, with the car raised off the ground a few inches. She discovers a noose around her neck and her hands tied behind her back. After Blaine tells her more of the killings, he gets in the car, starts it up and puts it in gear, stepping on the gas pedal. The top of Faith's head rips away, along with the top of the skull. She dies a slow, painful death. Blaine bends down and presses the top of Faith's brain, gushing blood in his eyes. Blinded for the moment, it allows Siouxsie to break free her wrists and escape.

Siouxsie makes her way to the chemistry lab, pursued by Blaine. He manages to knock her out while speaking to his mom on the phone. She recovers and momentarily blinds him. They make their way to the entrance, as the steel security door opens where Faith's father and mother, Reverend Jackson. Mrs. Jackson, Sara's mother, Mrs. Hasegawa, Brian's father, Mr. Marquez enter, with guns drawn, and a chase ensues. Blaine runs in a different direction. Siouxsie runs back to the auto shop where she lowers Blaine's car and moves the jack, and starts the car. Seeing Blaine in the rearview mirror, she puts the car in reverse, pinning Blaine and breaking his legs. Blaine's mom, watching through the school security monitors, makes her intentions of killing them both known, and through Blaine's phone, see their image through a robotic cockroach on Blaine's car. She breaks down the shop's garage door, running over Mr. Marquez and drives a short distance while dragging Blaine behind the car till she crashes. Siouxsie exits the car and Blaine's body drops from the ceiling, hanging from a noose. Mrs. Hasegawa then shoots at Siouxsie, who ducks behind Blaine's car and retrieves her improvised flame thrower. She sets Mrs. Hasegawa on fire. A SWAT team arrives and enters the school as Siouxsie flames Reverend Jackson. Siouxsie walks into the football stadium bleachers. The SWAT team enters and tries to get her to drop the weapon. Senator Wilkes orders the men to fire. A shot rings out and Siouxsie torches one, while Max, hiding in the news booth, shoots the other SWAT men. Senator Wilkes looks on from the press box, defeated. The remaining security gates open as Siouxsie gets on her motorcycle and leaves.

Later on, Senator Wilkes and Nash discuss how they need to fix the "problem" while all the bodies are bagged in the parking lot.

At Crestview Asylum, a mystery girl shows up and sees Matt and says to him "They see everything". She gives him a small box, and when he opens it, he reacts a bit frightened. Inside is a robotic cockroach, and she says "Gonna get you out of here. We got some shit to do." Meanwhile, Max, in his workshop, is tinkering with a robotic cockroach and the top of the roach is imprinted "PROPERTY US GOV".

A scene after the credits shows Nash and Ethel shoot a man several times and wonder if he was in on the plan and argue who shot first, while they were still at the school.

== Cast ==
- Sammi Hanratty as Siouxsie Hess ("Undercrust")
- Colby Arps as Blaine Wilkes ("Mr. Clean")
- Sophia Taylor Ali as Faith Jackson ("Preacher's Daughter")
- Erika Daly as Sara Hasegawa ("Cat Lover")
- Matthew Frias as Brian Marquez ("Latin Spice")
- Ben Browder as Max (school janitor)
- Sufe Bradshaw as Dr. Knight (Dean of Students)
- Ashlyn McEvers as Alyson Hess (Siouxsie's dead sister)
- Alexandra "Ali" Astin as Ethel Balducci
- Sean Astin as Headmaster Nash
- Drake Bell as Ben, aka "The Naked Wizard"
- Gina Gershon as Senator Wilkes
- Cameron Deane Stewart as Matt Clark
- Scott Edward Logan as Reverend Jackson
- Susana Gibb as Mrs. Jackson
- Catherine Grady as Mrs. Hasegawa
- Marcus DeAnda as Mr. Marquez

== Reception ==
On the review aggregator website Rotten Tomatoes, 10% of 10 critics' reviews are positive, with an average rating of 4.1/10. Metacritic, which uses a weighted average, assigned the film a score of 22 out of 100, based on 4 critics, indicating "generally unfavorable" reviews.
