= Cameron Deane Stewart =

American actor (born 1991)

- Born: April 8, 1991 (age 35); California, U.S.
- Occupation: Actor
- Years active: 2010–present

Cameron Deane Stewart (born April 8, 1991) is an American actor. He is known for his roles in the films Geography Club, Pitch Perfect, and the television teen sitcom iCarly.

== Career ==
Cameron played the role of Steven in iCarly and Victorious's special, "iParty with Victorious" in 2011. In 2013, he has gained more attention from his leading role as Russell, a closeted gay teen who joins his high school football team, in Geography Club. He went on to feature as Tom in Pitch Perfect. He had a recurring role as Jace in the Disney Channel sitcom Austin & Ally as well as several other television series.

== Filmography ==
Film roles
Year	Title	Role	Notes
2011	That's What I Am	Carl Freel	
2012	Bad Kids Go to Hell	Matt Clark	
2012	Pitch Perfect	Tom	
2012	So Undercover	Cameron Harrison	
2013	Geography Club	Russell	Lead role
2014	By God's Grace	Chris Taylor	
2014	Knucklebones	Adam	
2017	Bad Kids of Crestview Academy	Matt Clark	

Television roles
Year	Title	Role	Notes
2010	A Walk in My Shoes	Justin Kremer	Television film
2011	iCarly	Steven	Crossover episode: "iParty with Victorious"
2011	Victorious	Steven	Crossover episode: "iParty with Victorious"
2011	Justice for Natalee Holloway	Matt Holloway	Television film
2012	A Smile as Big as the Moon	Josh	Television film
2012	American Horror House	Derek	Television film
2013	CSI: Crime Scene Investigation	Dylan Trigg	Episode: "Sheltered"
2013	Dirty Teacher	Danny Campbell	Television film
2013	The Confession	Daniel Fisher	Television film
2014	Austin & Ally	Jace	4 episodes
2014	The Walking Dead	Chris	Episode: "Inmates"
2014	Star-Crossed	Brock	2 episodes
2014	Occult	Josh	Television film
2014	Castle	Dean Bedford	Episode: "The Way of the Ninja"
2015	Rizzoli & Isles	McGruff / Michael Lyons	Episode: "Bite Out of Crime"
2016	Aquarius	Tex Watson	10 episodes
2025	Doctor Odyssey	Gabe Hollister	1 episode ("Double-Booked")
