= Murderess: The Winnie Ruth Judd Story =

2007 film

Murderess: The Winnie Ruth Judd Story is an all-puppet, feature-length narrative film that retells the story of Phoenix's infamous trunk murders of 1931.

The film, written and directed by Scott Coblio, was produced in Los Angeles between 2004 and 2007 on a shoestring budget.

== Release ==
The film premiere was held on October 11, 2007, at the Little Theater in Rochester, New York, as the centerpiece of the ImageOut LGBTQ+ Film Festival of that year.

After the premiere, the running time was cut by 22 minutes to 71 minutes.

Murderess then traveled to Phoenix, home of the Trunk Murder case, where it played at The Trunk Space venue: a coffee house/art gallery named after the case. The screening, in front of key figures in the case, was held to coincide with the anniversary and time of the murders. The event is now held annually at the venue.

== Credits ==
Art direction and miniature set design were carried out by L.A. artist J. Reto.

Winnie Ruth Judd was voiced by Joy Nash, with other characters voiced by Michael Kricfalusi, Fabrice Uzan, Trent Walker, among others.

Opening and closing themes were supplied by Squires of the Subterrain, and were written by Chris Zajkowski.

== Reviews ==
- Film critic Jack Garner, reviewing the premiere screening for Rochester's Democrat & Chronicle newspaper said:
  ...by far the weirdest entry in the festival. Sustaining interest in puppets over a 90 minute running time is challenging, but for the most part, Coblio manages it.
- Newsman Robert L. Pela, covering the Phoenix event for the New Times, wrote:
  Coblio's full-length film about Arizona's most notorious crime, tells Winnie's story using marionettes and arty photography in a movie that's more about emotion than murder.

== Awards ==
The film won Best Animated Feature at the 2008 DIY Film Festival in Los Angeles.
