= Found Footage 3D =

2016 American 3D found footage horror film

- Film poster
- Directed by: Steven DeGennaro
- Written by: Steven DeGennaro
- Produced by: Steven DeGennaro; Charles Mulford; Kim Henkel
- Starring: Carter Roy; Alena von Stroheim; Chris O'Brien; Tom Saporito; Scott Allen Perry; Jessica Perrin; Scott Weinberg
- Cinematography: Drew Daniels
- Edited by: Pete Barnstrom
- Production company: FF3D
- Release date: 2016
- Running time: 108 minutes
- Country: United States
- Language: English

Found Footage 3D is a 2016 American found footage horror film. It is the debut feature film of writer/director Steven DeGennaro, and was produced by Texas Chainsaw Massacre co-creator Kim Henkel. It is the first found footage horror movie shot natively in 3D. Filming began on May 26, 2014 in Gonzales, Texas, starring Carter Roy, Alena von Stroheim, Chris O'Brien, Tom Saporito, Scott Allen Perry, Jessica Perrin, and Scott Weinberg, and wrapped mid-June 2014.

The film's trailer debuted on Entertainment Weekly August 10, 2016. The film premiered at Bruce Campbell's Horror Film Festival on August 20, 2016, where it won the festival's inaugural jury award. Its international premiere took place at FrightFest on August 29, 2016. It screened at 20 different festivals between August and November 2016, winning 15 awards.

== Plot ==
A group of independent filmmakers — producer and actor Derek, editor Mark, lead actress Amy, sound technician Carl, director Andrew and production assistant Lily — travel to a cabin in a remote part of Central Texas to film the first ever 3D found footage movie, Spectre Of Death. Mark — Derek’s brother — is hired to film footage for a behind-the-scenes feature. Derek and Amy’s turbulent marriage is breaking up, with Derek privately revealing to Mark that Amy’s contract to star in the film was signed before they separated.

The group travels to Gonzales, Texas, with a script based on a warring couple who experience supernatural occurrences in a rural cabin. En route, the group debate the merits and conventions of the found footage genre. Derek reveals that the cabin they are staying in is reputed to be haunted in real life after its previous owner murdered his wife and dumped her body nearby; the revelation upsets Carl.

The shoot is fraught with difficulties. Derek’s authoritarian nature causes tension as he undermines Amy and Andrew’s contributions. Mark thinks he sees an apparition in the background of a shot while reviewing the day’s filming. Lily is injured by a shovel after confronting Amy about her belittling Lily. That night, Amy finds Mark’s footage of Derek badmouthing her. When a scripted argument between Derek and Amy erupts into a real confrontation, Amy’s scream destroys the contents of the kitchen; Carl attributes the phenomenon to a real ghost. That night, Derek and Amy have rough sex. The following morning she has a bruise on her left eye.

Pleased with their progress, Derek takes the crew to a bar and reveals he has invited influential horror critic Scott Weinberg to document proceedings. Amy is angered by Derek’s flirting with Lily. They return to the cabin to find all but Derek’s belongings wrecked, with Carl’s covered in slime; Carl storms off into the woods after an argument with Derek. Amy wakes to find her arm bleeding from being mauled. While reviewing footage with Mark, they find that an unknown party filmed the group as they slept and an invisible force wounded Amy. A black shape then attacks the two but only Amy, who is filming events, sees it.

Mark tells Derek he is leaving with Amy and the two come to blows. Derek relents and says he will not stand in Amy's way if she wants to leave. Amy decides to stay and Mark promises not to go without her. As they embrace, her eyes glow red. Scott arrives the next day and is unimpressed with the unprofessional shoot. Derek rewrites the climax so his character survives, infuriating Andrew. While filming a scene between them, Amy attacks Derek with a hammer. An invisible force locks the door, preventing his rescue before tremors shake the cabin. The door flies off its hinges, killing Scott, and the black shape explodes through Andrew’s chest, killing him. Mark and Lily flee into the woods.

Mark reasons that the entity is visible only via camera lens so he continues filming. They discover Carl’s bloodied corpse before Lily is killed by the entity. Mark runs back to the cabin and is about to leave in their van before hearing Amy’s voice over the mic, pleading for help. He braves the cabin — covered with Derek’s remains — to find a portable mic to locate Amy.

Mark finds her in the woods just as she is mauled again by the entity. They drive off but crash into a log blocking the road. A tearful Amy tells Mark she wishes he hadn’t returned for her, hoping he had remembered the cardinal rule of found footage — no characters survive — before her eyes glow red and she lunges at him.

== Cast ==
- Carter Roy as Derek
- Alena von Stroheim as Amy
- Chris O'Brien as Mark
- Tom Saporito as Andrew
- Scott Allen Perry as Carl
- Jessica Perrin as Lily
- Scott Weinberg as himself

== Production ==
In January 2014, Kim Henkel announced that production on Found Footage 3D was underway and that director Steven DeGennaro had written the film's script. DeGennaro, who had been developing the film's concept for two years, stated that he intended to incorporate 3D filmmaking into the movie's plot and that it "isn’t just a marketing ploy". He was inspired by films such as The Blair Witch Project and Scream while creating Found Footage 3D and wanted to utilize the film concept in Scream in that the film's characters are familiar with the horror genre and the rules and conventions therein. Actress Jessica Perrin was cast in April 2014, with the rest of the cast announced in late May. Filming began in Austin, Gonzales, and Dale, TX on May 26, 2014 and wrapped in mid-June of the same year.

The first draft of the film's found-footage script was written in 2012 and the idea for including the 3D concept was developed by "the 3rd or 4th draft", and over the course of two years and multiple drafts, the aspect became "woven more and more deeply into the fabric of the story and the visual planning for the film."

== Festivals & awards ==
Found Footage 3D premiered at Bruce Campbell's Horror Film Festival on August 20, 2016. It was the festival's first ever world premiere and received positive reviews, going on to win the festival's inaugural jury award. The international premiere occurred nine days later at the London-based FrightFest.

The trailer debuted on Entertainment Weekly on August 10, ten days before the world premiere.

Following the premieres, the film screened at 18 other festivals around the world. It won 15 awards, including four for best feature, four for acting, two for special effects, best director, best screenplay, best cinematography, scariest feature, and an audience award.

Screening Date(s)	Festival	Award(s)
August 20, 2016	Bruce Campbell's Horror Film Festival	Jury Award
September 16, 2016	Splat! Film Fest	Best Feature; Scariest Feature; Best Special FX
October 15, 2016	Fear Fete Horror Con	Best Feature
October 15, 2016	Horroquest	Best Cinematography; Best Supporting Actor (Scott Allen Perry)
October 15 & 18, 2016	Austin Film Festival	Audience Award
October 22, 2016	Madtown Horror Film Festival	Best Feature; Best Director; Best Special FX; Best Actress (Alena von Stroheim)
October 30, 2016	Eerie Horror Film Festival	Best Actress (Alena von Stroheim)
November 12, 2016	NYC Horror Film Festival	Best Screenplay; Best Actor (Carter Roy)
