= The Wild Man of the Navidad =

- Theatrical release poster
- Directed by: Duane Graves; Justin Meeks
- Written by: Duane Graves; Justin Meeks
- Produced by: Kim Henkel
- Starring: Justin Meeks; Alex Garcia; Tony Wolford; Charlie Hurtin; Bob Wood; Edmond Geyer; Mac McBride; James Bargsley; Stacy Meeks; Patrick Hewlett
- Cinematography: Duane Graves
- Edited by: Duane Graves; Justin Meeks
- Music by: James McCrea; James Brand; Charlie Hurtin; Marshall Jones; Ben Buchanan
- Distributed by: MPI Media Group (North America)
- Release date: April 24, 2008 (Tribeca Film Festival)
- Running time: 86 minutes
- Country: United States
- Language: English

The Wild Man of the Navidad is a 2008 American independent slasher monster movie written and directed by Duane Graves and Justin Meeks. It was picked up by IFC Films shortly after its world premiere at the 2008 Tribeca Film Festival, and re-released in 2021 by MPI Media Group. Dread Central named it one of the "Top 10 Bigfoot Movies of the 21st Century."

== Plot ==
This film is allegedly based on the real-life journals of Dale S. Rogers, a man who, in the 1970s, lived along the banks of the Navidad River in Sublime, Texas - the same area where the original legend of the Wild Man of the Navidad surfaced in the late 1800s. The film follows Dale, his wheelchair-using wife Jean, and her oft-shirtless, lazy-eyed caretaker Mario. Though their ranch sits on vast acres prime for paying hunters, Dale has resisted opening up the land because of the strange, Bigfoot-like creatures supposedly inhabiting it, but after the prodding of some of the rifle-loving townsfolk and the loss of his welding job, Dale gives in and opens the gate to his compound. Then, the hunters become the hunted.

== Cast ==
- Justin Meeks as Dale S. Rogers
- Alex Garcia as Mario Jalisco
- Tony Wolford as the Wild Man
- Stacy Meeks as Jean Rogers
- Bob Wood as Earl Smith
- Edmond Geyer as Sheriff Lyle Pierce
- William McBride (as William 'Mac' McBride) as Boss Man Jack
- Charlie Hurtin as Karl Crabtree
- Patrick Hewlett as Vern Findlay
- James Bargsley as Melvin Pennell

== Production ==
The film is a throwback to drive-in Sasquatch films of the 1970s like The Legend of Boggy Creek, and is known for its recreation of their specific vintage style, pacing and feel—from the real-life characters down to the period production design and music. The film was co-produced by Kim Henkel, co-writer of the original The Texas Chain Saw Massacre with Tobe Hooper in 1974 and was written, directed and edited by two of Henkel's screenwriting/production students, Justin Meeks and Duane Graves.

== Reception ==
Ain't It Cool News described it as "about as perfect a Bigfoot film I've seen so far." Scott Foy of Dread Central describes the film as "a creepy, southern-fried creature feature." IFC Films' Alison Willmore states that it is "a welcome palate cleanser" for the horror genre. Scott Weinberg of Cinematical calls it "enthusiastically splattery...a rather spirited little terror tale...that actually feels like it has been hidden in a vault." Daily Variety critic John Anderson writes "cult status is already achieved...Wild Man mixes homage with horror for a pretty potent dose of movie moonshine." Merle Bertrand of Film Threat relates it as "wonderfully retro...it's time to go back to the drive-in."
