= Eggshells (film) =

- Theatrical release poster
- Directed by: Tobe Hooper
- Written by: Tobe Hooper; Kim Henkel
- Produced by: David L. Ford; Tobe Hooper; Raymond O'Leary
- Starring: Ron Barnhart; Pamela Craig; Allen Danziger; Sharron Danziger; Kim Henkel
- Cinematography: Tobe Hooper
- Edited by: Robert Elkins; Tobe Hooper
- Music by: Spencer Perskin; Shiva's Headband; Jim Schulman; Tobe Hooper
- Distributed by: Watchmaker Films (2009 re-release)
- Release date: 1969
- Running time: 89 minutes
- Country: United States
- Language: English
- Budget: $40,000

Eggshells is a 1969 American independent experimental film directed by Tobe Hooper in his directorial debut. Hooper, who co-wrote the film with Kim Henkel, also served as one of the film's producers. The film centers on a commune of young hippies, who slowly become aware of an otherworldly presence that resides in the basement.

== Plot ==
A group of young hippies, having recently moved into an old house in the woods, slowly become aware of an otherworldly presence residing in the basement of the house.

== Cast ==
- Mahlon Foreman as Mahlon
- Ron Barnhart as Ron
- Amy Lester as Amy
- Kim Henkel as Toes
- Pamela Craig as Pam
- Jim Schulman as Jim
- Allen Danziger as Allen

== Production ==
Hooper reflected on the film later when recounting his first efforts as a filmmaker: "It's a real movie about 1969. It's kind of vérité but with a little push. Like a script on a napkin, improvisation mixed with magic. It was about the beginning of the end of the subculture. Most of it takes place in a commune house. But what they didn't know is that in the basement is a crypto-embryonic-hyper-electric presence that managed to influence the house and the people in it. The influences in my life were all kind of politically, socially implanted."

== Preservation ==
After the films release, there were a couple of screenings in July of 1972. After the success of The Texas Chain Saw Massacre (1974), people went looking for the film, before considered lost as no one had a working copy. In the 2000’s Louis Black from The Austin Chronicle led a project to restore the film after it was relocated. The restored version premiered in 2009 at SXSW, where it received favorable reviews.

== Reception ==
In 2017, Zane Gordon-Bouzard of Birth.Movies.Death stated that the film "lay[s] out its rambling vision of hippie life in Austin, Texas in a series of acid-splashed reveries". Gordon-Bouzard also noted that the film displayed many of the themes and motifs that would become a staple in director Hooper's later films. Louis Black from The Austin Chronicle gave the film a positive review, stating that the film very much emulated the works of Jean-Luc Godard. Black also praised the film for its capturing of 1960s Austin attitudes and lifestyles, as well as the psychedelic visuals and Hooper's direction.

== See also ==
- List of American films of 1969

== Sources ==
=== Books ===
- Macor, Alison (February 22, 2010). Chainsaws, Slackers, and Spy Kids: Thirty Years of Filmmaking in Austin, Texas. University of Texas Press. ISBN 978-0-292-77829-0.
- Towlson, Jon (March 20, 2014). Subversive Horror Cinema: Countercultural Messages of Films from Frankenstein to the Present. McFarland & Company. ISBN 978-0-7864-7469-1.

=== Websites ===
- Black, Louis (March 13, 2009). "SXSW FILM - Found Film: The rehatching of Tobe Hooper's 1969 debut, 'Eggshells'". AustinChronicle.com. Austin, Texas: The Austin Chronicle.
- Bloom, John (November 2004). "They Came. They Sawed". TexasMonthly.com. Texas Monthly. Archived from the original on February 7, 2012.
- Gordon-Bouzard, Zane (September 14, 2017). "The Psychedelic Illumination Of Tobe Hooper's EGGSHELLS". BirthMoviesDeath.com. Birth.Movies.Death.
