= Sublime, Texas =

Unincorporated community in Texas, US

Coordinates: 29°28′44″N 96°47′51″W

Sublime is an unincorporated community in Lavaca County, Texas, United States. Sublime has a post office, with the ZIP code 77986.

== Gallery ==
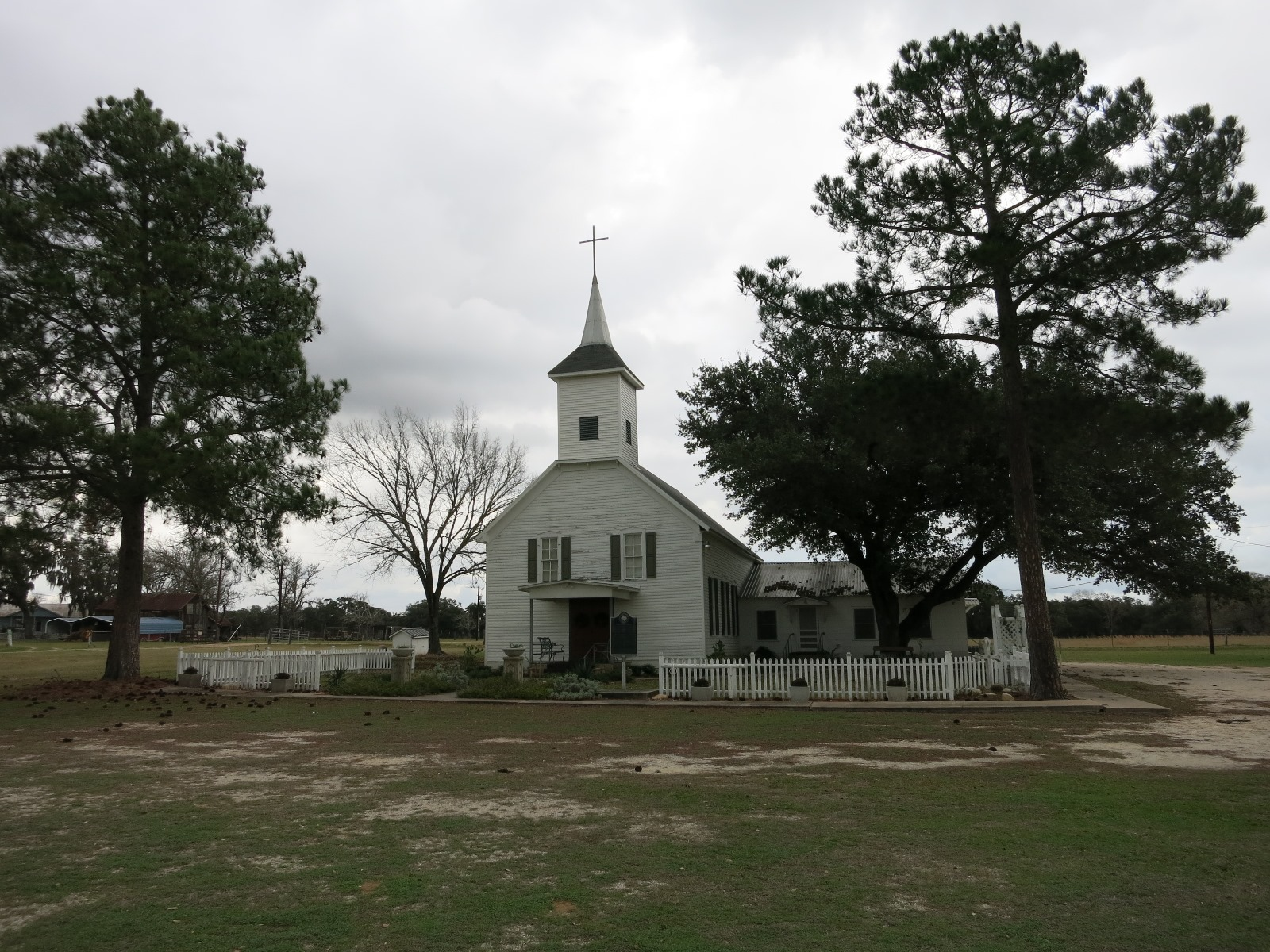
The state historical marker for Zion Lutheran Church states that the congregation was founded in 1868.

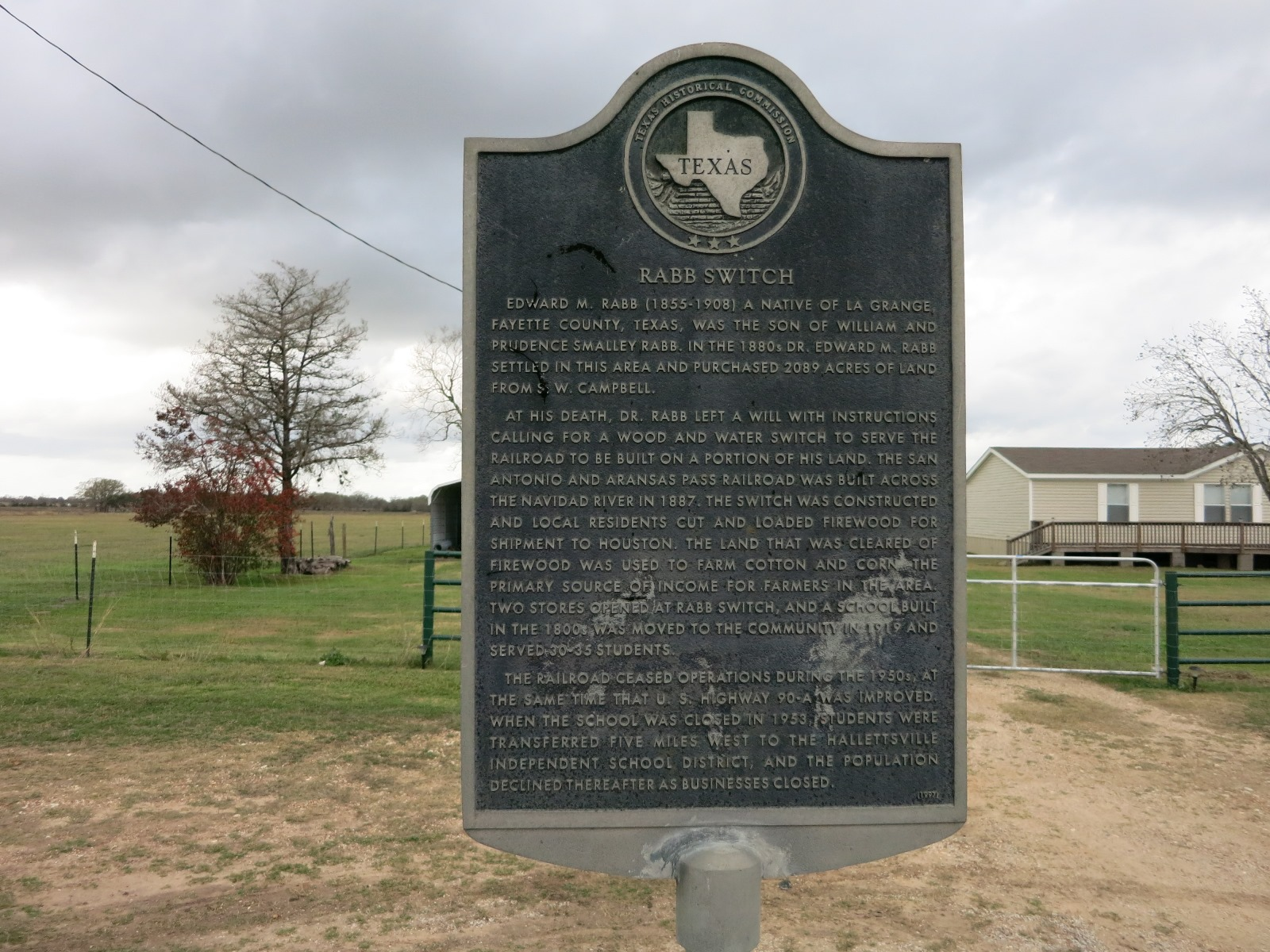
The former site of Rabb Switch is on US 90A west of Sublime, Texas.

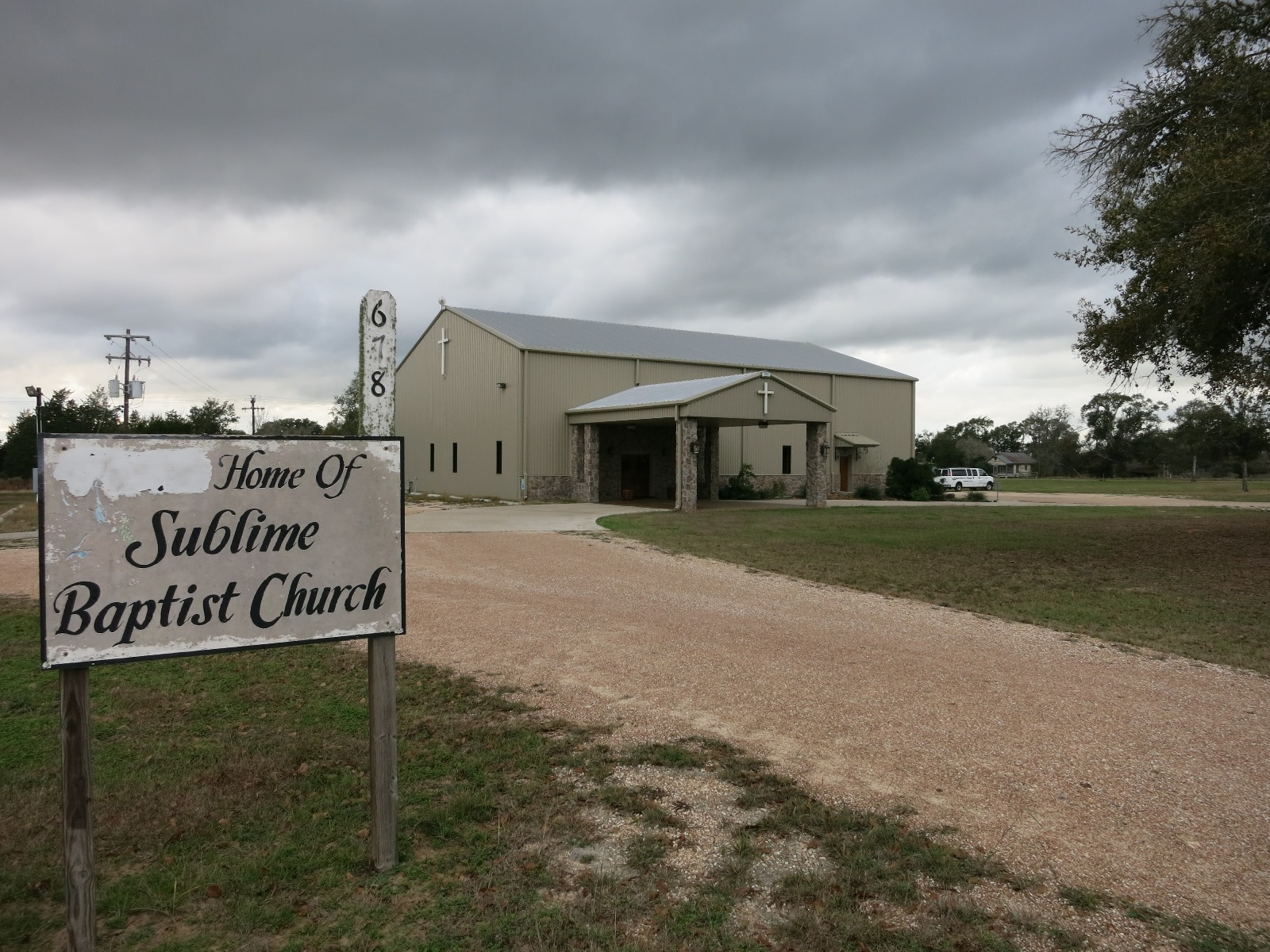
The new Sublime Baptist Church replaced an older building located nearby.
