= National Down Syndrome Congress =

US non-profit organization

- NDSC's Logo
- Abbreviation: NDSC
- Formation: 1973
- Purpose: Educational, advocate, legal, research
- Headquarters: Roswell, Georgia, United States
- Official language: English, Espanol
- President: Sean Smith
- Website: www.ndsccenter.org

The National Down Syndrome Congress (NDSC) is a national not-for-profit organization that provides individuals, families, and health care providers information and support about Down syndrome, as well as advocating with and on behalf of individuals with Down syndrome.

The NDSC provides free, up-to-date information concerning all aspects of life with Down syndrome. The organization also maintains a public policy and legislative advocacy team in Washington, D.C.

== History ==
The NDSC was an outgrowth of meetings held by the Arc of the United States, and the NDSC was officially formed in 1973. It was the first organization to focus specifically on the needs of individuals with Down syndrome, rather than generalized intellectual or cognitive disabilities. Though originally based in Illinois, the national headquarters is now in Atlanta, Georgia.

In 2020, Shauntel Neal-Howe, of Spring, Texas, was elected president of the organization. Since 2003, David Tolleson has served as executive director.

Past Presidents
Tenure	Name	Home
1973–1976	Pete Starr	Owings Mills, Maryland
1976–1977	Dr. Sig Pueschel	East Greenwich, Rhode Island
1977–1978	Robert Glasgow	Washington, DC
1978–1979	Lucille Msall	Oak Park, Illinois
1979–1982	Diane Crutcher	Normal, Illinois
1982–1985	Tom O'Neill	Ft. Wayne, Indiana
1985–1988	Frank Murphy	Atlanta, Georgia
1988–1990	Kathleen Marafino	St. Louis, Missouri
1990–1993	Michal Clark	Bakersfield, California
1993–1996	Maureen Babula	Phillipsburg, New Jersey
1996–2000	Betty Hersey	Dallas, Texas
2000–2001	Jo Ann Simons	Swampscott, Massachusetts
2001–2002	Kathleen Marafino	Cicero, New York
2002–2005	Judy Martz	Littleton, Colorado
2005–2008	Rich Robison	Sudbury, Massachusetts
2008–2011	Brooks Robinson	Pittsburgh, Pennsylvania
2011–2014	James Faber	Monument, Colorado
2014–2017	Dr. Marilyn Tolbert	Fort Worth, Texas
2017–2020	Dr. Kishore Vellody	Pittsburgh, Pennsylvania
2020–	Shauntel Neal-Howe	Spring, Texas

== Convention ==
Each year, the NDSC hosts the world's largest convention for individuals with Down syndrome and their families. The 2020 convention was changed to a virtual format due to the COVID-19 pandemic. The 2021 convention will be held will be held July 8–11 in Phoenix, Arizona. The convention has four main components—the General Convention, for parents and other family members, as well as professionals who work in the disability field; the Youth & Adults Conference, for teens and adults with Down syndrome; the Brothers & Sisters Conference, for school-age siblings; and, Kids' Camp, for children with and without Down syndrome. The Down Syndrome Medical Interest Group—USA usually holds its annual symposium in conjunction with the NDSC Convention.

The convention brings in world-renowned researchers and experts on Down syndrome and education to speak to parents about a variety of issues across the lifespan from infant nutrition and early childhood education through high school transitions and job placement through aging and nutrition issues. Learning tracks have included sessions for adult siblings as well as for families with a member who has a co-occurring diagnosis of Down syndrome and an autism spectrum disorder. In recent years, convention attendance has been around 4,000, with attendees coming from most U.S. states, and multiple nations.

Throughout its history, the NDSC Annual Convention has moved around the United States.

Convention Locations
Year	City
1973	Anaheim, California
1974	Washington, DC
1975	Las Vegas, Nevada
1976	Indianapolis, Indiana
1977	New Orleans, Louisiana
1978	Boston, Massachusetts
1979	Atlanta, Georgia
1980	St. Louis, Missouri
1981	Portland, Oregon
1982	Chicago, Illinois
1983	Providence, Rhode Island
1984	San Antonio, Texas
1985	Anaheim, California
1986	Wichita, Kansas
1987	Washington, DC
1988	Cincinnati, Ohio
1989	Denver, Colorado
1990	Memphis, Tennessee
1991	Boston, Massachusetts
1992	Atlanta, Georgia
1993	Anaheim, California
1994	Minneapolis, Minnesota
1995	Washington, DC
1996	Miami Beach, Florida
1997	Phoenix, Arizona
1998	Dallas, Texas
1999	Pittsburgh, Pennsylvania
2000	Washington, DC
2001	Cancelled due to the September 11 attacks.
2002	Denver, Colorado
2003	Philadelphia, Pennsylvania
2004	Minneapolis, Minnesota
2005	Anaheim, California
2006	Atlanta, Georgia
2007	Kansas City, Missouri
2008	Boston, Massachusetts
2009	Sacramento, California
2010	Orlando, Florida
2011	San Antonio, Texas
2012	Washington, DC
2013	Denver, Colorado
2014	Indianapolis, Indiana
2015	Phoenix, Arizona
2016	Orlando, Florida
2017	Sacramento, California
2018	Dallas, Texas
2019	Pittsburgh, Pennsylvania
2020	Convention From Your Couch
2021	Brand New Day
2022	New Orleans, Louisiana
2023	Orlando, Florida
