= Kim Henkel =

American film director

- Born: Kim David Henkel; January 19, 1946 (age 80); Virginia, U.S.
- Education: University of Texas, Austin
- Occupations: Screenwriter; film director; film producer; actor
- Known for: Co-writer of The Texas Chain Saw Massacre

Kim David Henkel (born January 19, 1946) is an American screenwriter, director, producer, and actor. He is best known for co-writing the horror film The Texas Chain Saw Massacre with Tobe Hooper.

== Life and career ==
=== Early years and education ===
Henkel was born in Virginia and grew up in several small towns in South Texas. He began his university studies at the University of Texas at Austin in 1964 majoring in English. He graduated in 1969. Mutual friends introduced Henkel to Tobe Hooper and Henkel acted in Hooper's first feature film, Eggshells (1969).

=== Career ===
Henkel and Hooper co-wrote the original The Texas Chain Saw Massacre screenplay. Henkel both wrote and directed a sequel, Texas Chainsaw Massacre: The Next Generation (1995). He also wrote and co-produced the Eagle Pennell classic Last Night at the Alamo (1983) as well as the adaptation for Hooper's Eaten Alive (1977).

Henkel returned to the horror genre in 2012 with another tale of cannibals titled Butcher Boys, which was co-directed by two of his former film students Duane Graves and Justin Meeks. Henkel had previously worked with the pair as a producer on their debut feature The Wild Man of the Navidad. Most recently, he produced the horror film Found Footage 3D, which was released on the horror streaming service Shudder in 2017.

He has been a lecturer in screenwriting at Rice University; as well as Texas A&M University - Corpus Christi.

== Filmography ==
Year	Title	Credit	Notes
1969	Eggshells	Actor, writer	Role: Toes
1974	The Texas Chain Saw Massacre	Writer	
1977	Eaten Alive	Writer (adaptation)	
1980	The Unseen	Story	Uncredited
1983	Last Night at the Alamo	Writer, actor	Role: Lionel
1995	Texas Chainsaw Massacre: The Next Generation	Writer, director	
1995	Doc's Full Service	Writer	
2003	The Texas Chainsaw Massacre	Co-producer	
2004	Rio Peligroso: A Day in the Life of a Legendary Coyote	Actor	Role: Voice (uncredited)
2006	The Texas Chainsaw Massacre: The Beginning	Producer	
2008	The Wild Man of the Navidad	Actor, producer	Roles: Radio Host #2 / Lionel
2012	Butcher Boys	Writer, producer	
2013	Texas Chainsaw 3D	Executive producer	
2016	Found Footage 3D	Producer	
2017	Leatherface	Executive producer	
2022	Texas Chainsaw Massacre	Producer	
