= E. L. Katz =

American filmmaker

- Born: Evan Louis Katz; January 7, 1981 (age 45); New York City, New York, U.S.
- Occupations: Film director, producer, screenwriter
- Years active: 2004–present
- Spouse: Mette-Marie Kongsved (divorced)
- Relatives: Peter Katz (brother)

Evan Louis Katz (born January 7, 1981) is an American film director, producer, and screenwriter. He made his directorial debut with Cheap Thrills (2013). In 2014, he directed the first segment in the horror anthology film ABCs of Death 2, titled "A is for Amateur". In 2017, his second feature film, Small Crimes, was released on Netflix. With him being the director and co-writer. He went on to direct Azrael, which was released in 2024. He is the brother of producer Peter Katz.

== Filmography ==
=== Short film ===
Writer

- The Little One (2004)
- The Girlfriend (2005)
- 1000 Year Sleep (2007)
- Laura Panic (2008)
- Little Sister Gone (2008)
- Cerebella (2009) (Story only)

Director

- A Is for Amateur (2014) (Segment of ABCs of Death 2)

=== Feature film ===
| Year | Title | Director | Writer | Producer |
|---|---|---|---|---|
| 2005 | Mortuary | No | No | Yes |
| 2007 | Home Sick | No | Yes | Yes |
| 2007 | Pop Skull | No | Yes | Yes |
| 2008 | Autopsy | No | Yes | No |
| 2011 | What Fun We Were Having: 4 Stories About Date Rape | No | Yes | No |
| 2013 | Cheap Thrills | Yes | No | No |
| 2017 | Small Crimes | Yes | Yes | Executive |
| 2024 | Azrael | Yes | No | No |

Actor

| Year | Title | Role |
|---|---|---|
| 2007 | Home Sick | Cashier |
| 2007 | Pop Skull | Eddie |

Associate producer

- A Horrible Way to Die (2010)
- V/H/S/94 (2021)

Co-producer

- The Aggression Scale (2012)

=== Television ===
| Year | Title | Director | Executive Producer | Notes |
|---|---|---|---|---|
| 2018 | Channel Zero: The Dream Door | Yes | Co-Executive | 6 episodes |
| 2019 | Swamp Thing | Yes | No | Episode "The Long Walk Home" |
| 2020 | The Haunting of Bly Manor | Yes | Co-Executive | Episode "The Beast in the Jungle" |
| 2024 | Teacup | Yes | Yes | 2 episodes |

Writer

| Year | Title | Note |
|---|---|---|
| 2016 | Hap and Leonard | Episode "The Dive"; also producer |
