= Night Terrors (film) =

1993 horror film

- Poster artwork
- Directed by: Tobe Hooper
- Written by: Daniel Matmor; Rom Globus
- Produced by: Harry Alan Towers
- Starring: Robert Englund; Zoe Trilling; Alona Kimhi; Julianno Merr
- Cinematography: Amnon Solamon
- Edited by: Alain Jakubowicz
- Music by: Dov Seltzer
- Production company: Global Pictures
- Distributed by: Cannon Video
- Release dates: 9 November 1993 (Germany); 19 September 1995 (U.S. video)
- Running time: 98 minutes
- Countries: Canada; Israel
- Language: English

Night Terrors is a 1993 horror film directed by Tobe Hooper. It stars Robert Englund in a dual role, as both Chevalier and the Marquis de Sade. The film was originally set to be shot in Egypt, which later was changed to Tel Aviv, which led the original director to quit the feature and the production company to hire director Tobe Hooper. It is a co-production between Canada and Israel.

The film has received several negative reviews, noting Hooper's lower quality output following the release of Poltergeist.

== Plot ==
A young girl travels to Cairo to visit her father, and becomes unwillingly involved with a bizarre sadomasochistic cult led by the charismatic Paul Chevalier, who is a descendant of the Marquis de Sade.

== Cast ==
- Robert Englund as Paul Chevalier / Marquis De Sade
- Zoe Trilling as Genie
- Alona Kimhi as Sabina
- Juliano Mer-Khamis as Mahmoud
- Chandra West as Beth
- William Finley as Dr. Matteson
- Irit Sheleg as Fatima

== Production ==
In 1993, Globus made three films with producer Harry Alan Towers, and managed to place all three of their Israeli-produced films in the interim of Cannon or Warners for video distribution. Among the films, only Night Terrors achieved theatrical distribution. Night Terrors was written by Daniel Matmor, though Rom Globus is also credited. It is Globus' only film credit.

When actor Robert Englund learned about the filming being shot in Alexandria, Egypt, Englund stated he "jumped at the chance . . . but then the whole project went through radical transformation." Englund noted that the script was changed so that it was no longer about de Sade, but based on a collection of his erotic short stories, and that he would be playing a descendant of him as well as playing de Sade himself in a number of flashbacks. Englund then explained that the filming moved from Egypt to Tel Aviv in Israel, where they had to change it from a period film to a contemporary time frame with the original director quitting the project. Englund commented "I wasn't too thrilled about it, and the producers realized it, so to keep me happy, they hired one of my favourite directors . . . Tobe Hooper."

Post-production on two of both Night Terrors and The Mummy Lives were sent to Canada.

== Critical reception ==
In a contemporary review, Entertainment Weekly described the film as a hybrid of the work of Zalman King and Stephen King and that the film "shouldn't necessarily have been attempted by the stars and director of 1976's Eaten Alive."

John Kenneth Muir wrote in Horror Films of the 1990s, "Many Tobe Hooper films admirably shatter taboos and film decorum, but there's little intellectual, stylish gamesmanship in this underwhelming film." Muir, in book on the films of Hooper described it as a "heavy-handed, turgid muddle of a movie that isn't thrilling or even particularly erotic (though it has been dubbed an "erotic thriller"). [...] There's no sign of his infectious sense of humor [...] or even his unflagging energy." Contemporary North American Film Directors noted that, along with 1989's Spontaneous Combustion, director Tobe Hooper "plumbed new depths".
