= Peter Katz =

Peter Katz may refer to:

- Peter Katz (film producer), American film producer
- Peter Katz (musician) (born 1981), Canadian singer-songwriter
