= Crocodile (2000 film) =

- VHS cover
- Directed by: Tobe Hooper
- Screenplay by: Michael D. Weiss; Adam Gierasch; Jace Anderson
- Story by: Boaz Davidson
- Produced by: Danny Lerner; Frank Demartini; Boaz Davidson
- Starring: Mark McLauchlin; Caitlin Martin; Chris Solari
- Cinematography: Elliot Rockett
- Edited by: Andy Horovich; Alain Jakubowicz
- Music by: Serge Colbert
- Production companies: Nu Image; Flat Dog Corporation
- Distributed by: Lions Gate
- Release date: August 26, 2000
- Running time: 93 minutes
- Countries: United States; Mexico
- Language: English
- Budget: $1.2 million

Crocodile is a 2000 direct-to-video horror film directed by Tobe Hooper. The film involves a group of college students on a houseboat for spring break who stumble across a nest of eggs, and unknowingly enrage a large female Nile crocodile that stalks and kills them one by one. It was followed by Crocodile 2: Death Swamp, a film with no relation to the plot of the original beyond featuring the same individual giant crocodile and its sole offspring. The film is an international co-production between the United States and Mexico.

== Plot ==
Eight teenagers, including Brady, Claire, Duncan, Kit, Annabelle, Sunny, Foster, and Hubs, are going on a weekend boat trip on a remote lake in Southern California for spring break. As the group is about to depart on their boat, Sheriff Bowman warns them to be sensible and stay out of danger. After a day of partying, the group has a bonfire, where Kit tells them a local story about how in the early 20th century, a hotel owner named Harlan featured a 40 ft (12 m) crocodile named Flat Dog at his hotel. Harlan eventually sets up a shrine to Flat Dog, believing her to be an avatar of the ancient Egyptian crocodile god (Sobek), creating a cult that worshiped the crocodile. The town eventually ran Harlan away because of his heathenism and torched his hotel years later when Kit was a kid. Close by, two local fishermen destroy a crocodile nest, only for them both to be attacked by Flat Dog, who devours them both.

The next day, the teenagers continue to party. Annabelle's dog, Princess, runs away, leading the group to the crocodile's nest, where Duncan breaks an egg, and Hubs hides the last one in Claire's bag. At night, Sunny becomes incredibly drunk and reveals Brady cheated on Claire with her, resulting in Claire breaking up with Brady. Hubs, who is also heavily intoxicated, falls asleep at the bonfire while the rest of the group returns to the boat. Some time later, Hubs attempts to return to the boat but is eaten by Flat Dog, and the boat, untied, begins to drift in the lake. In the morning, the friends find their boat has become stuck, leaving them stranded. While the rest of the group attempts to fix the boat, Brady and Sunny go to try to find Hubs. Sunny attempts to get Brady to go swimming, but she narrowly escapes an attack by Flat Dog. The pair rushes back to the boat to warn the others. However, Flat Dog arrives and sinks the boat, killing Foster.

Meanwhile, Sheriff Bowman finds the fishermen’s and Hubs’ remains, before visiting Shurkin and Lester, two locals who take care of alligators. Shurkin sets out with the Sheriff to find Flat Dog — and kill her to avenge the deaths of his grandfather and father — while Lester is seen to be feeding her, but is eventually devoured himself. As night falls, the teenagers are still stranded in the woods searching for a road. Flat Dog returns, and ultimately, Sunny is eaten. The rest of the group reaches a small shop, where Brady attempts to phone the Sheriff, but Flat Dog breaks through a wall and devours Annabelle. As Kit escapes to start the truck outside, Brady, Claire, and Duncan fight off Flat Dog. In the chaos, a fire starts, which causes the truck to explode, killing Kit and scaring away Flat Dog.

The next day, the Sheriff and Shurkin find Brady, Claire, and Duncan and pick them up on their boat. Soon after, Flat Dog finds them. Shurkin is knocked into the water and eaten before the Sheriff is also killed. With the boat's engine broken, the survivors swim to land. Claire finally discovers Flat Dog's last egg in her bag, and the group uses it as bait to lure her to them so they can kill it. As Flat Dog arrives, Duncan attempts to kill her. However, he is quickly swallowed whole, only to be regurgitated moments later due to being covered in bug-spray. Claire gives Flat Dog the egg, which hatches into a baby crocodile, before she returns to her nest, leaving Claire, Princess, Brady, and Duncan free to escape.

== Cast ==
- Mark McLauchlin as Brady Turner
- Caitlin Martin as Claire
- Chris Solari as Duncan McKay
- Doug Reiser as Kit
- Julie Mintz as Annabelle
- Sommer Knight as Sunny
- Rhett Jordan as Foster
- Greg Wayne as Hubs
- Harrison Young as Sheriff Bowman
- Terrence Evans as Shurkin
- Vern Crofoot as Harvey
- Larry Udy as Arnold
- Adam Gierasch as Lester

== Production ==
Producer Frank DeMartini said that, with Crocodile, director Tobe Hooper was "trying to [...] recapture the fright of" The Texas Chain Saw Massacre. Hooper agreed, saying, "It's the 25th anniversary of the first Chain Saw, and I really wanted to create an atmosphere that will wind you up like that"; although he also stated, "Stylistically, I'm going for an entirely different look from anything I've ever done, or anything you'd expect me to do." Noting that the movie was his second about crocodiles, after Eaten Alive, he described Crocodile as a campfire film with a "mythological background. There's a legend connected with it. Every town in America seems to have some story of [a] lake or woods with a monster in it." He compared the characters to those in Deliverance, as Crocodile also becomes about survival.

According to DeMartini, casting director Cathy Henderson-Martin auditioned two thousand people, narrowing the pool down to a few hundred who met with Hooper and DeMartini.

The screenplay was written by Michael D. Weiss, Adam Gierasch, and Jace Anderson. Thomas Crow of Fangoria stated that Hooper had "tinkered with" the script. Hooper said, "On paper, something may look good, but things change. Speaking in broad strokes, we've been reshaping some of the dialogue [to suit the actors]. The idea on the page will certainly get to the screen, but I'm aiming for spontaneity."

== Release ==
Crocodile was released directly to DVD on August 26, 2000. It was rereleased by Trimark on October 9, 2001, as part of a DVD box set that also included King Cobra, Octopus, and Spiders.

== Reception ==
On review aggregator Rotten Tomatoes, Crocodile holds an approval rating of 25% based on 4 reviews.

In a contemporary review, Joseph O'Brien of Rue Morgue wrote, "There are occasional flashes of Hooper's brand of weirdness", noting a scene where a crocodile hunter attacks the beast that killed his father. O'Brien added that the film was like an episode of "Dawson's Creek where most of the cast are munched by a big reptile; a not-unrewarding experience if viewed in this light. [...] Ultimately though, even the good bits are only good enough to make you wish you were watching Alligator or maybe even Lake Placid instead." Will Wilson of Deep Red gave the movie one out of four, stating that "the degree to which Tobe Hooper continues to mar his early cinematic legacy is alarming. His once imposing filmic reputation suffers another deadly blow with this stuff, an as by-the-numbers film as one can get." Wilson wrote that "arguing that Hooper has lost it is rather a redundant point. We all know he has. It is just how far he has plummeted that is shocking."

Matthew Chernov of Variety would later place Crocodile eighth on a list of the top ten alligator films, noting it was not as strong as Eaten Alive, but had a "cheesy charm that's undeniable", and was better than the "SyFy Channel movies it occasionally resembles [...] Despite some dodgy CGI effects, Hooper's talent behind the camera shines through."

== Sequel ==
Nu Image would produce a sequel, Crocodile 2: Death Swamp. The film's director, Gary Jones, said the second film is "not really a sequel. It doesn't follow the plotline, characters, or anything. It's a totally new story, except that one of the characters happens to be a crocodile."

== See also ==
- List of killer crocodile films
