= Mortuary (2005 film) =

- Theatrical release poster
- Directed by: Tobe Hooper
- Written by: Jace Anderson; Adam Gierasch
- Produced by: Tony DiDio; E. L. Katz; Peter Katz; Alan Somers
- Starring: Dan Byrd; Alexandra Adi; Denise Crosby; Courtney Peldon; Bug Hall
- Cinematography: Jaron Presant
- Edited by: Andrew Cohen
- Music by: Joseph Conlan
- Production company: Echo Bridge Entertainment
- Distributed by: Echo Bridge Home Entertainment
- Release date: October 21, 2005 (New York City Horror Film Festival)
- Running time: 94 minutes
- Country: United States
- Language: English
- Box office: $894,722

Mortuary is a 2005 American zombie horror film directed by Tobe Hooper. It stars Dan Byrd, Alexandra Adi and Denise Crosby. Mortuary was Tobe Hooper's last US-produced film before his death in 2017 (his final directorial credit being the 2013 Emirati horror film Djinn, produced by Image Nation).

== Plot ==
After the loss of their father, the Doyle family – Leslie, Jonathan, and Jamie – move to the Fowler Mortuary in the hope of starting a new life, but find it in poor condition. Jonathan goes to the local diner, where he meets Cal and his two girlfriends, Tina and Sara. Jonathan also meets Liz, a local girl; Grady, Liz's best friend; and Rita, Liz's aunt, who employs her at the diner. Jonathan learns from them about the legend of Bobby Fowler, an abused and deformed boy who lived in the mortuary. Jonathan, Liz, and Grady become friends quickly. That night, Cal, Sara, and Tina go to the graveyard outside the mortuary and vandalize it; they then go into one of the crypts, where they are attacked by Bobby Fowler.

The next day, Jonathan, Liz, and Grady go back to Jonathan's house, where Grady gives them drugs. Shortly afterward, Sheriff Howell shows up to welcome Leslie to the town. He informs her about his attempt to stop "graveyard babies". He is also looking for Cal, Sara, and Tina. Sheriff Howell investigates the crypts, where Bobby Fowler infects him. The next day at the diner, Jonathan and Liz are working when a messy Cal and Sara arrive. Cal has a rage attack, and Sara begins vomiting black ooze. Rita comes in to calm her down, but is infected in the process. At the mortuary, Leslie performs her first embalming. While doing so, she makes a mess of the embalming fluids. While going to clean it up, one of the bodies gets up and infects Leslie. Jonathan, Jamie, Liz, and Grady return to Jonathan's house for dinner, where Leslie, now infected with the mysterious ooze, has prepared a sort of ooze soup. The four notice a black fungus growing on the wall. Liz pours salt into her soup, making it bubble and sending Leslie into a rage, during which she attacks Jonathan and Jamie. Liz and Grady quickly escape.

Shortly afterward, Jonathan fights off his mother and saves Jamie. The four escape outside but are forced to retreat into a crypt after being chased there by an infected man. The four make the shocking discovery that Bobby lives in the crypt and has dug tunnels under the cemetery. They find Tina, who is still alive, but are attacked by the mother. They find a ladder that leads back into the house, where they barricade themselves. They question Tina and eventually cut her hand to see if her blood has turned into the black ooze, a sign of the infection. Sheriff Howell assaults the house with a shotgun. Tina goes into the kitchen to clean the wound, but is infected by contaminated water. Grady accidentally pours salt on her, burning her. The group now knows the infected's weakness, but their victory is short-lived when they learn that Jamie, whom Jonathan had left in her room to keep her safe, has been captured.

Shortly after entering the tunnels, they see and hear things; a hand suddenly punches through Grady's chest, giving him enough time to say quietly, "run", before dying. They soon find the source, a well filled with black ooze. Shortly thereafter, Jamie is found, but captured by Bobby Fowler and taken back to the lair, where they confront him by throwing salt in the well. Cal is killed by getting his head blown off by the Sheriff, and the other infected are burned with salt; Bobby is sucked in, and the three escape the house. The three are relieved to escape but still grieve the deaths of Leslie and Grady. As they are about to leave the house, Jonathan is pulled underground; the reanimated Leslie rushes over and grabs Jamie, and Liz's fate remains unknown.

== Cast ==
- Denise Crosby as Leslie
- Dan Byrd as Jonathan
- Stephanie Patton as Jamie
- Alexandra Adi as Liz
- Bug Hall as Cal
- Courtney Peldon as Tina
- Tarah Paige as Sara
- Rocky Marquette as Grady
- Greg Travis as Eliot Cook
- Michael Shamus Wiles as Sheriff Howell

== Production ==
Filming began in January 2005 in Pomona, California.

== Release ==
Mortuary premiered at the New York City Horror Film Festival on October 21, 2005. It received a limited theatrical release in January 2006. It was released on Blu-ray July 29, 2008.

== Critical reception ==
Bloody Disgusting rated it 2/5 stars and said that "it's for die-hard Hooper fans only." Steve Barton of Dread Central rated it 3/5 stars and called the film "dumb fun" that has an uneven tone. Barton concludes, "In the end, despite its identity crisis and other short comings, there's a lot to like about Mortuary." JoBlo.com gave the film 1/10 claiming "This had to be the worst genre film that I've seen in the last 5 years."
