= Adam Gierasch and Jace Anderson =

American husband-and-wife filmmakers

Adam Gierasch
- Born: United States
- Occupations: Screenwriter, film director, actor
- Spouse: Jace Anderson

Jace Anderson
- Born: United States
- Occupations: Screenwriter, film producer, actress
- Spouse: Adam Gierasch

Adam Gierasch and Jace Anderson are American husband-and-wife filmmakers, known for their work in the horror genre. Adam Gierasch is also known as an actor and director, and he released his directorial debut Autopsy in 2008.

== Filmography ==
=== Films written together ===
- Spiders (2000, screenplay)
- Crocodile (2000, screenplay)
- Panic (2002, screenplay)
- Crocodile 2: Death Swamp (2002, screenplay)
- Derailed (2002, screenplay)
- Killer Rats (2003, screenplay)
- Toolbox Murders (2004)
- Mortuary (2005)
- Mother of Tears (2007)
- Autopsy (2008)
- Night of the Demons (2009)
- Fertile Ground (2011)
- Fractured (2013)
- He Knows Your Every Move (2018)
- The Long Game (2025)

=== Anderson, as actor ===
- Thirsty (2009, voice of Slushy Cup)
- Fertile Ground (2011, as Headmistress in Photo)
- This Week in Horror (2011, 1 episode, as herself)
- FEARnet's Movies with More Brains (2011, as herself)
- Into the Dark: Exploring the Horror Film (TBA, as herself)

=== Anderson, as producer ===
- Fractured (2013)
- House by the Lake (2015)

=== Anderson, as director ===
- The Long Game (2025)

=== Gierasch, as director ===
- Autopsy (2008, also scriptwriter)
- Night of the Demons (2009, also screenplay)
- Fertile Ground (2011, also scriptwriter)
- Fractured (2013, also scriptwriter)
- House by the Lake (2015)
- Tales of Halloween (2015, segment Trick)
- House by the Lake (2017)
- Spaghetti (2023)

=== Gierasch, as actor ===
- Martial Law (1999, 1 episode, as Groomsman)
- The Others (2000, 1 episode, as Male Passenger)
- Crocodile (2000, as Lester)
- Beyond Belief: Fact or Fiction (2000, 1 episode)
- Rats (2003, as Jim)
- Toolbox Murders (2004, as Ned Lundy)
- The Hollow (2004, as Dad)
- Mortuary (2005, as Mr. Barstow)
- Roman (2006, as Boyd)
- Room Nine (2007, as Mechanic)
- Red Sands (2009, as Sergeant Ramsey)
- Thirsty (2009, as Conspiracy Host- voice only)
- Fertile Ground (2011, as Otto)
- Big Ass Spider (2011, as Homeless Man)
- Isolation (2021, as News Reporter - segment "5G")
