= Clayton Chitty =

Canadian actor and model (born 1985)

- Born: Clayton James Chitty-Oldham; March 18, 1985 (age 41); North Vancouver, British Columbia, Canada
- Other name: Clayton James
- Occupations: Actor; Model
- Years active: 2006–present
- Children: 2

Clayton Chitty, aka Clayton James (born March 18, 1985) is a Canadian actor and model. He is best known for his role in the Lifetime TV movie Her Infidelity.

== Early life ==
Chitty was born March 1985 in North Vancouver and was raised by his single mother. He started making his first films in which he directed, edited and starred in with his childhood friends.

He began commercial auditions at age twenty one when a family friend recommended a meet with a local talent agent. He then met teacher Andrew Mcilroy who inspired Clayton to pursue a career in acting.

Clayton has trained in Los Angeles and in Vancouver. He has worked on TV shows such as Supernatural, The Killing, Fringe and King & Maxwell. His big break came starring opposite Rachel Hunter in Her Infidelity in 2015. He played a superhero in the reboot of Electra Woman and Dyna Girl in 2016 and is a spokesperson for Gibson's Whisky.

== Filmography ==
=== Film ===
Year	Title	Role	Notes
2013	Finding Mr. Right	Club Guy	
2014	Primary	Drunk Buddy	
2015	Blood Ivy	Phil	
2017	Power Rangers	Young Cop	
2019	My Mother's Stalker	Paul	
2020	Looking for Mr. Wonderful	Michael	
2024	A Stranger's Child	Leon	

=== Television ===
Year	Title	Role	Notes
2011	Fringe	Patrol Officer	Episode: "Novation"
2012	Untold Stories of the E.R.	Steve	Episode: "Girlfriend, Wife, Stroke!"
2012	Supernatural	Quentin	Episode "Blood Brother"
2012	The Killing	Uniform Cop	Episode: "Reflections"
2012	13 Witches	Christian	
2013	King & Maxwell	Ray Palermo	Episode: "Wild Card"
2013	Model Killers	Angry Boyfriend	Episode: "Model Murderer/Strangled Beauty"
2014	Wedding Planner Mystery	Shawn	TV movie
2015	Her Infidelity	Grayson Kendall	TV movie
2016	Electra Woman and Dyna Girl	Major Vaunt	
2016	Three Bedrooms, One Corpse: An Aurora Teagarden Mystery	Mackie	TV movie
2016	The Man in the High Castle	Young George	2 episodes
2017	Arrow	Vincent Sobel	Episode: "Second Chances"
2017	Britney Ever After	Kevin "K-Fed" Federline	TV movie
2017	Rogue	Handsome Dan	Episode: "The Determined and the Desperate"
2017	Inconceivable	Trent	Episode: "The Elephant in the Room"
2017	Zoo	Sam Parker	Episode: "Wham, Bam, Thank You Sam"
2017	Undercover Angel	Dave	TV movie
2018	The Sweetest Heart	Luke	TV movie
2018	A Christmas Arrangement	Joe	TV movie
2018–2020	When Calls the Heart	Kevin Townsend	Recurring role
2019	Made for You, with Love	Keith	TV movie
2019	The Last Bridesmaid	Craig	TV movie
2019	The Terror	Private Burlingham	2 episodes
2019	Stumptown	Bouncer	Episode: "Forget It Dex, It's Stumptown."
2019	Christmas on My Mind	Brad Martin	TV movie
2020	Legends of Tomorrow	Officer Sullivan	Episode: "Miss Me, Kiss Me, Love Me"
2020	Ruby Herring Mysteries	Dr. Luke Baldwin	Episode: "Prediction Murder"
2020	Blueprint to the Heart	Haiden	TV movie
2020	Christmas on the Menu	Tanner Rhodes	TV movie
2020	As Gouda as it Gets	Jack Wolfe	TV movie
2021	Superman & Lois	Derek Powell	2 episodes
2021	Right in Front of Me	Liam	TV movie
2021	Romancing the Birthday Girl	Josh	TV movie
2021	Love and Where to Find It	Jonah	TV movie
2022	The Christmas Retreat	Mark	TV movie
2022–2024	So Help Me Todd	Chuck Grant	Recurring role
