= Toolbox Murders =

- Theatrical release poster
- Directed by: Tobe Hooper
- Written by: Jace Anderson; Adam Gierasch
- Based on: The Toolbox Murders by: Ann Kindberg; Robert Easter; Neva Friedenn
- Produced by: Tony DiDio; Gary LaPoten; Terence S. Potter; Jacqueline Quella
- Starring: Angela Bettis; Brent Roam; Juliet Landau; Rance Howard; Marco Rodríguez; Sheri Moon
- Cinematography: Steve Yedlin
- Edited by: Andrew Cohen
- Music by: Joseph Conlan
- Production companies: Alpine Pictures; Scary Movies LLC; Toolbox Murders, Inc.
- Distributed by: Lions Gate Films
- Release dates: March 19, 2004 (Hamburg Nacht der 1000 Schreie, Germany); April 10, 2004 (US)
- Running time: 95 minutes
- Country: United States
- Language: English

Toolbox Murders is a 2004 American slasher film directed by Tobe Hooper, and written by Jace Anderson and Adam Gierasch. It is a remake of the 1978 film The Toolbox Murders and was produced by the same people behind the original. The film is centered on the occupants of an apartment who are stalked and murdered by a masked killer.

== Plot ==
Daisy Rain goes to her apartment in the Lusman Arms, a former luxury hotel undergoing renovations, and is beaten to death with a hammer by a man wearing a balaclava. In another room, new tenants Nell and Steven Barrows, a teacher, and a medical intern are introduced to the amenities and a few of the residents by Byron, the building manager. As Steven works long hours, Nell is left alone most of the time, and befriends Julia Cunningham, a neighbor down the hall, and Chas Rooker, an elderly man who reveals some of the history of the structure, mentioning it was made by Jack Lusman, who disappeared mysteriously, and that builders died while working on it.

As days pass, the Lusman Arms are plagued by mysterious circumstance; strange noises are heard throughout it and coming from the intercoms, Nell finds a trinket containing human teeth in a wall, and Julia and another tenant vanish, having been killed (with a drill and a nail gun, respectively) by the ski-masked murderer, who hides their bodies. While looking into Julia's disappearance, Nell speaks with Chas, who offers cryptic warnings about the nature of the building, and sneaks Nell a note reading "Look for her in Room 504". Nell takes the advice and discovers that there is no Room 504 and that all the other floors lack apartments whose numbering should end with 4.

Nell goes to the Los Angeles Preservation Society, where an employee tells her that Jack Lusman was an occultist who associated with a society that tried to mix science and magic and that the symbols (which Nell copies down on her arms) decorating the building are part of a spell. The blueprints for the Lusman Arms also reveal that there is a townhouse hidden within the structure, hence all the missing rooms. Nell returns home and finds a hatch on the roof of the building that allows entrance into the townhouse, where she uncovers a room dedicated to the Golden Age of Hollywood, torture chambers, and dozens of corpses. The killer, who had just butchered another tenant and the handyman, appears, and removes his mask to reveal that he is a monster, which the credits refer to as "Coffin Baby."

A teenage resident discovers that the webcam he had been using to spy on Julia had recorded her death, prompting him to go to Steven, who finds Nell's notes about the building, and goes looking for her along with the boy, Byron, and the doorman. The men send the teen to get the police after they find a passageway into Coffin Baby's lair, which they enter. Coffin Baby kills Byron and the doorman, and gives chase to Nell and Steven, the former of whom theorizes that Coffin Baby needs death and the Lusman Arms to continue existing. The Barrows are found by Chas, who tries to lead them to safety, and murmurs that Coffin Baby came into the world when he clawed his way out of his dead and buried mother's womb.

Coffin Baby leaps out from under a pile of human remains, fatally throws Chas at a wall, and captures Nell, but she is saved by Steven, who bludgeons Coffin Baby, and knocks a shelf onto him. The authorities arrive and take Steven to a hospital, and as Nell returns to her apartment, the police lift up the debris that fell on Coffin Baby, who has disappeared. Coffin Baby crashes through Nell's window and tries to kill her, but is disoriented by the runes she had earlier drawn on her arms, distracting him long enough for a pair of police officers to barge in, and shoot him out a window, causing him to be hanged by a cord Nell had wrapped around his neck. The officers check on Nell, then go to the window, only to find that Coffin Baby has once again vanished.

== Cast ==
- Angela Bettis as Nell Barrows
- Brent Roam as Steven Barrows
- Marco Rodríguez as Luis Saucedo
- Rance Howard as Charles "Chas" Rooker
- Juliet Landau as Julia Cunningham
- Adam Gierasch as Ned Lundy
- Greg Travis as Byron McLieb
- Adam Weisman as Austin Sterling
- Sara Downing as Saffron Kirby
- Chris Doyle as Coffin Baby
- Christina Venuti as Jennifer
- Jamison Reeves as Hudson
- Stephanie Silverman as Dora Sterling
- Alan Polonsky as Philip Sterling
- Charlie Paulson as Hans
- Eric Ladin as Johnny Turnbull
- Sheri Moon Zombie as Daisy Rain
- Price Carson as Officer Daniel Stone
- Carlease Burke as Officer Melody Jacobs
- Ralph Morris as Nell Barrows's Father
- Bob McMinn as Shadow Man

== Production ==
Jacqueline Quella stated in one of the production interviews for the DVD release that she'd acquired the remake rights to The Toolbox Murders, but was unable to finish watching the film, calling it a "terrible, misogynistic" film focused on showing little more than women being horrifically murdered, and so she wanted the remake to differ greatly from the original rather than adapt it.

Lucky McKee was originally set to play the part of the killer, but dropped out to work on his own horror film The Woods (2006).

Sheri Moon Zombie acted in the film as a personal favor to Tobe Hooper, who was friends with her husband, musician and filmmaker Rob Zombie.

The tools in the toolbox belonged to Hooper himself.

One of the production companies financing the film dissolved during filming, shutting production down early and resulting in some creative and perfunctory editing.

== Release ==
Toolbox Murders first premiered at the Fest Fearless Tales Genre Fest at the Victoria Theatre on March 11–14, 2004. Later that year it was screened at Scotland's Dead By Dawn Horror Film Festival on April 22–25.

=== Home media ===
The film was released on DVD by Live/Artisan on March 15, 2005. It was later released on special edition was released by Anchor Bay Entertainment on April 15 and as a regular edition on May 16 both that same year.

== Reception ==
On Rotten Tomatoes, the film holds an approval rating of 50% based on 14 reviews, with a weighted average rating of 6/10.

Ed Gonzales from Slant Magazine gave the film a negative review, stating that "Aesthetically and theoretically, Toolbox Murders may be Hooper’s most impressive film in years", but criticized the film's characters, and "ludicrous supernatural plot". TV Guide's Maitland McDonagh graded the film 2 / 5 stars, calling it "an excuse for a series of stalk-and-slash scenes". Film critic Leonard Maltin awarded the film 1.5 out of 4 stars, stating that the "Decent production values do little to elevate this predictable 1970s-style gorefest". Film Threat gave the film a mixed review, writing, "Left in the hands of a lesser director, Toolbox Murders could have been a downright stupid haunted house with gore movie. But Hooper’s keen eye for creeping shadows and great art direction by Steven R. Miller give it an atmospheric punch. The scenes of violence manage to be both graphic and chilling, lending weight to an otherwise silly sounding plot. Sadly, although entertaining, the film never quite lives up to expectations. The mix of black humour, supernatural mystery and straight up slasher horror never completely mesh and you can’t helping thinking that things would have been better if they’d just stuck to a subgenre."

Variety wrote, "Toolbox may not renew the splatter genre in any significant way, but the chills and kills prove Hooper, when armed with the right script, can still tighten the fright screws". Felix Vasquez from Cinema Crazed wrote, "I’ll admit The Toolbox Murders will never win any awards in the horror field, but as a piece of pure mindless horror with gore galore, I dug it a lot simply for its schlock value, and so-stupid-it’s-good fun." David Cornelius from eFilmCritic graded the film a score of 3/5 stars, stating that the film was "a decent little B thriller, eager to please. It gives its audience exactly what it wants, providing enough blood to satisfy the splatter freaks, enough chills to satisfy more laid-back horror fans". Cornelius also commended the film's atmosphere, and performances, while also criticizing the mystery of the killer's identity as feeling "tossed off without much regard".

== Related film ==
A sequel to Toolbox Murders started production in 2011; however production ceased when the film ran out of production funds and it was discovered that one of the producers, Tony DiDio, did not have chain of title or rights to the Toolbox Murders franchise. The movie was completed by additional producers as Coffin Baby which is completely spun-out of the Toolbox Murders franchise and was released in 2013. The film was then re-released as Toolbox Murders 2 in 2015. Despite the stalled release of Toolbox Murders 2 and a no chain of title, the producers tried to develop a Toolbox Murders 3 via crowdfunding in 2015 but were unsuccessful and the project was cancelled.
