= Fractured (2013 film) =

- Directed by: Adam Gierasch
- Written by: Jace Anderson; Adam Gierasch
- Starring: Callum Blue; Vinnie Jones; Ashlynn Yennie
- Cinematography: Scott Winig
- Edited by: Andrew Cohen; Erin Deck
- Music by: Adam Barber
- Production companies: 4PIX, Schism
- Distributed by: Seven Arts Pictures, Uncork'd Entertainment
- Release date: October 12, 2013 (Screamfest Horror Film Festival)
- Country: United States
- Language: English

Fractured (originally known as Schism) is a 2013 psychological horror film that was directed by Adam Gierasch, based on a script by Gierasch and his writing partner Jace Anderson. The film had its world premiere on October 12, 2013, at the Screamfest Horror Film Festival. It stars Callum Blue as an amnesiac trying to discover what exactly happened to him.

== Plot ==
Dylan White (Callum Blue) has no memory of his life prior to waking up from a coma. He has created an entirely new identity as an ordinary cook in Baton Rouge. Things are normal for Dylan until he begins to experience horrifying visions, forcing him to look further to discover who he was before he lost his memory.

== Cast ==
- Callum Blue as Dylan / Jaron
- Vinnie Jones as Quincy
- Ashlynn Yennie as Brandy
- Nicole LaLiberte as Marlena
- Jon Eyez as Reggie
- Eric F. Adams as Gary
- Steve DeMartino as Bartender
- Lily Virginia Filson as Hell Girl with Tattoo
- Brent Phillip Henry as Johnny (as Brent Henry)
- Jeanine Hill as Coma Patient
- Samantha Ann Huffman as Hell Girl
- Indigo as Holly
- Skitch King as Motel Clerk
- Charlotte Kirk as Hellion
- Ken Massey as Brothel 'John'

== Production ==
Gierasch came up with the concept of Fractured (then titled Schism) after he talked Anderson out of a potentially unpleasant plane trip, which made him feel guilty. From there he wondered about the concept of guilt and redemption and "Can you change your fate, or are you damned forever once you fuck up? Can you ever truly make amends?" From there Gierasch and Anderson wrote the script and planned for filming to take place in New Orleans. Gierasch chose to cast Ashlynn Yennie in the film due to her role in The Human Centipede. The film was given its world premiere in 2013 under the name Schism, but had to undergo a name change before it was given a further release due to the foreign sales company handling the movie.

== Release ==
It was announced that Fractured would be released in theaters and digital download on April 11, 2014. It was the first film to be released by Seven Arts Entertainment's new genre label, Dark Arts.

=== Home media ===
The film was released on DVD by Phase 4 Films on June 10, 2014.

== Reception ==
Fearnet gave a positive review for Fractured and praised one of the film's death scenes, as they found it "so dark, disturbing, and visually powerful that it allows one to overlook some rather egregiously cheap CGI gun play that pops up later on." Patrick Cooper from Bloody Disgusting praised the film, writing, "a sexy blend of nightmarish horror and mystery that’s as consistently intriguing as it is disturbing. It takes a while for the film to build up steam as it piles up its clues and puzzles, but once it gets going Fractured delivers a haunting portrait of a normal guy trying to save his soul from damnation."

In contrast, Shock Till You Drop and About.com both gave less positive reviews, with About.com stating that the acting of the film's leads was solid but that the supporting cast was "more uneven" and that the direction was "visually bland". Scott Hallam from Dread Central awarded the film a score of 2.5 out of 5, writing, "Fractured is something of a mystery, something of a horror film, but not much of either. Outstanding practical F/X save this movie and make it something at least worth giving a glace. And if not for the F/X, it’s worth it for LaLiberte’s performance. The movie has a concept that possibly could work, but ultimately falls flat. It’s not a bad effort, but it never grabs the audience outside of a couple practical F/X scenes." Paul Doro from Comingsoon.net gave the film a ShockScore of 3/10, stating, "Fractured doesn’t know what kind of movie it’s trying to be. It’s got a bluesy score and appears to be trying for noir at times, but it has no sense of what type of mood that necessitates. The visions are out of a horror movie, but it never generates any suspense and is certainly never scary."
