= Hold Your Breath (2024 film) =

Film by Karrie Crouse and Will Joines

- Release poster
- Directed by: Karrie Crouse; Will Joines
- Written by: Karrie Crouse
- Produced by: Alix Madigan-Yorkin; Lucas Joaquin
- Starring: Sarah Paulson; Amiah Miller; Annaleigh Ashford; Alona Jane Robbins; Ebon Moss-Bachrach
- Cinematography: Zoë White
- Edited by: Luke Ciarrocchi
- Music by: Colin Stetson
- Production companies: Mad Dog Films; Secret Engine
- Distributed by: Searchlight Pictures
- Release dates: September 12, 2024 (TIFF); October 3, 2024 (United States)
- Running time: 94 minutes
- Country: United States
- Language: English

Hold Your Breath is a 2024 American psychological horror-thriller film directed by Karrie Crouse and Will Joines, and written by Crouse. It stars Sarah Paulson, Amiah Miller, Annaleigh Ashford, Alona Jane Robbins, and Ebon Moss-Bachrach.

The film premiered in the Special Presentations section at the Toronto International Film Festival on September 12, 2024, followed by a streaming release as a Hulu original film through Searchlight Pictures on October 3, 2024. It was released internationally on Disney+ as well.

== Plot ==
In 1930s Oklahoma, Margaret Bellum lives on a formerly successful farmland, now razed by the Dust Bowl. She works alongside her two daughters, teenaged Rose and her younger sister Ollie, who became deaf and mute after a bout of scarlet fever. Her youngest daughter, Ada, died due to the illness, causing a grieving Margaret to experience violent sleepwalking episodes, which she prevents by taking sleeping pills. The family patriarch, Henry, has moved away to Philadelphia to take a construction job, and though he wanted Margaret and the girls to join him, Margaret declined due to her unwillingness to leave Ada's grave behind. One night, Rose reads "The Grey Man" to Ollie, the story of a man who kills his family, but is overtaken by a dust storm and perishes; he can enter victims' bodies and control them.

During a weekly sewing circle, Margaret learns that a drifter allegedly broke into a neighbor's house, tied up the father, and murdered the rest of the family. She becomes more anxious while protecting the property, and her fears become true when a strange man, Wallace, is discovered hiding in her barn. Wallace, a preacher, is wearing Henry's coat and claims that he encountered Henry on the job site, and the latter requested that he pass by to check on the family; he had only been hiding to recover from the storm. A suspicious Margaret orders him to leave, but when Wallace miraculously heals Rose's dust-induced bloody nose, and then promises to help the family's ailing cow, Margaret relents and allows him to stay.

The family's situation improves thanks to Wallace's presence, and the area even enjoys a rain shower, which Wallace had promised to request from God. Eventually, a letter from Henry reaches the family after many dust-related delays. Margaret is shocked when Henry unwittingly reveals that Wallace had stolen the coat and money therein, and possibly murdered another worker. Margaret forces him to leave at gunpoint. Wallace burns the letter so that Margaret cannot bring it to the sheriff, and warns Margaret that he will be back and cannot be stopped, since he is "The Grey Man."

Margaret takes his warnings seriously, even though Rose insists that she had lent him the story, and that he is just trying to intimidate her. Margaret moves the family into one room, seals the house, and gradually stops leaving the house. She also stops taking her sleeping pills in order to stay alert for Wallace, which causes her to hallucinate and sleepwalk. Despite the house's security, strange events begin to occur, such as the girls' bed lighting on fire during the night and objects moving despite all doors being locked. Margaret's paranoia increases even though later gossip at the sewing circle indicates that there might be no murdering drifter, and the killer might instead have been the family patriarch.

Margaret eventually takes the girls to a local dance on the advice of her sister, Esther, as it is rumored around the area that she is going insane, and Margaret is afraid that she will be deemed unfit to raise the girls and they will be taken away from her like Ada was. However, at the event, Margaret has a public breakdown, claims that Wallace is a paranormal entity that is attacking her household, and warns the congregation of "The Grey Man." Rose takes her back home, where Margaret has a hallucination of Wallace invading the property and shoots his corporeal self. In the process, she nearly kills Rose, who begs her to wake up; Rose later discovers that Margaret did not shoot Wallace, but Esther, who had visited to check on Margaret. Rose tries to escape with Ollie, but a dust storm is rolling in, leaving them trapped.

As the storm begins, the sheriff arrives, as he had been concerned about Margaret's demeanor since the dance. A resigned Rose admits Margaret is unfit, but an insane Margaret stabs him to death before he can take the girls away. She tells Rose that since they will execute her for killing him, they all must commit group suicide so they can stay together and join Ada. Unable to kill her mother outright, Rose instead tricks her into going out into the storm. She tearfully cuts the safety line, leaving Margaret to die in the storm. The girls later travel to Philadelphia to reunite with their father.

== Cast ==
- Sarah Paulson as Margaret Bellum
- Amiah Miller as Rose Bellum
- Annaleigh Ashford as Esther Smith
- Alona Jane Robbins as Ollie Bellum
- Ebon Moss-Bachrach as Wallace Grady
- Bill Heck as Henry Bellum

== Production ==
In June 2020, Karrie Crouse and Will Joines were set to co-direct Dust, a psychological horror-thriller Crouse wrote in the Sundance Institute Writer's Lab, with Alix Madigan and Lucas Joaquin producing. Claire Foy was cast as the lead. At the end of the year, the script was voted onto The Black List of the year's most-liked screenplays that were not yet produced in 2020.

By July 2022, Sarah Paulson replaced Foy as the lead due to scheduling issues. By August and September 2022, Annaleigh Ashford, Ebon Moss-Bachrach, Bill Heck, and Amiah Miller were reported to be in the cast.

Principal photography commenced by August 5, 2022, in New Mexico. The film employed approximately 152 New Mexico crew members and 153 local background talent. Locations include Stanley, Santa Fe, and Gallisteo. By April 2024, the film was retitled Hold Your Breath.

== Release ==
In October 2020, Searchlight Pictures acquired Hold Your Breath. The film premiered as part of the Special Presentations lineup at the Toronto International Film Festival on September 12, 2024. It was subsequently released by Searchlight Pictures as a Hulu original film in the United States on October 3, 2024. Internationally, the film was made available to stream on Disney+. Hold Your Breath was also released on Disney+ Hotstar.

== Reception ==
=== Viewership ===
JustWatch, a guide to streaming content with access to data from more than 40 million users around the world, calculated that Hold Your Breath was the most-streamed film in the U.S. from September 30 to October 6. The film maintained its top position the following week. The streaming aggregator Reelgood, which monitors real-time data from 20 million users in the U.S. for original and acquired streaming programs and movies across subscription video-on-demand (SVOD) and ad-supported video-on-demand (AVOD) services, announced that it was the fourth most-streamed film from October 3—9. Hold Your Breath ranked No. 3 on Hulu's "Top 15 Today" list—a daily updated list of the platform's most-watched titles—on October 9.

=== Critical response ===
On the review aggregator website Rotten Tomatoes, 40% of 55 critics' reviews are positive, with an average rating of 5.3/10. The website's consensus reads: "Sarah Paulson is as arresting as ever, but a dearth of incident and scares ultimately robs Hold Your Breath of long-awaited release." Metacritic, which uses a weighted average, assigned the film a score of 47 out of 100, based on 10 critics, indicating "mixed or average" reviews.

John Serba of Decider praised Hold Your Breath for its relentless pacing, strong sound design, and eerie visuals that blur the line between reality and hallucination. He stated that while the film's disturbing body horror scenes are effective, some plot issues disrupt the tension, but found that overall, it succeeds in creating a gripping psychological horror experience. Robert Levin of Newsday rated Hold Your Breath three out of four stars and described it as a slow-burn, atmospheric horror film. Levin complimented Paulson’s performance as a mother descending into madness while facing an unseen threat. He stated that while the film succeeds in creating a chilling atmosphere, it falls into familiar genre routines, offering mood and tone over significant plot development but ultimately rewarding viewers who embrace its suffocating dread.

Randy Myers of The Mercury News said Hold Your Breath stands out for its psychological horror and mystery. He praised Paulson's performance as a sleep-deprived, anxious mom and stated that the film taps into a national mood of paranoia and anxiety, making it both chilling and relevant, despite its narrative taking on too many directions. Brian Tallerico of RogerEbert.com rated Hold Your Breath two out of four stars. He complimented Paulson’s performance as the film’s emotional anchor but stated that the movie ultimately suffered from a lack of narrative tension. While some scenes were described as "well-executed"—especially those with Ebon Moss-Bachrach and Paulson—Tallerico felt that the film failed to maintain momentum, leaving it a collection of striking scenes rather than a cohesive whole.

=== Accolades ===
Hold Your Breath was nominated for Outstanding Achievement in Cinematography in Limited or Anthology Series, or Motion Picture Made for Television at the 2025 American Society of Cinematographers Awards.
