= Michael Bowen (actor) =

American actor

- Occupation: Actor
- Years active: 1982–present
- Parent(s): Michael Bowen and Sonia Sorel
- Relatives: Max Henius (great-grandfather); Robert Carradine (half-brother); Keith Carradine (half-brother); Martha Plimpton (half-niece); Ever Carradine (half-niece); Sorel Carradine (half-niece)

Michael Bowen is an American actor. He is known for portraying Nicolas Cage's romantic rival, Tommy, in the film Valley Girl (1983), Danny Pickett on the ABC series Lost, and Jack Welker on the AMC series Breaking Bad (2012–2013).

== Early life ==
Bowen is the only son of Beat painter Michael Bowen Sr. and actress Sonia Sorel (née Henius; 1921–2004) who was Bowen's first wife. His maternal great-grandfather was biochemist Max Henius, a Danish immigrant to America who himself was of Polish-Jewish descent, and his maternal great-grandmother was the sister of historian Johan Ludvig Heiberg. He grew up in San Francisco knowing "interesting characters—revolutionary-type people," which inspired his portrayal of Uncle Jack on the AMC series Breaking Bad. Through his mother's other marriage he is the half-brother of actors Robert and Keith Carradine of the Carradine family. He is the half-uncle of actresses Martha Plimpton and Ever Carradine.

== Career ==
Besides his TV work and his appearance as Tommy in Valley Girl, Bowen has more than 130 film credits to his name as of 2022, including The Godfather Part III (1990), Beverly Hills Cop III (1994), Jackie Brown (1997), Magnolia (1999), Kill Bill Volume 1 (2003), Walking Tall (2004), and Django Unchained (2012). On November 30, 2015, Fox announced he would play Matches Malone on Gotham. His most recently released film is A Soldier's Revenge, which was released in 2020.

== Filmography ==
=== Film ===
Year	Title	Role
1982	Forbidden World	Jimmy Swift
1983	Valley Girl	Tommy
1984	The Wild Life	Vince
1984	On the Line	Customs Officer
1984	Night of the Comet	Larry Dupree
1985	Private Resort	Scott
1986	Echo Park	August
1986	Iron Eagle	Knotcher
1986	The Check Is in the Mail...	Gary Jackson
1987	Amazing Grace and Chuck	Hot Dog
1987	Less than Zero	Hop
1989	Season of Fear	Mick Drummond
1989	Mortal Passions	Berke
1989	The Ryan White Story	Harlan
1990	The Godfather Part III	Mask #2
1991	The Taking of Beverly Hills	L.A. Cop at Roadblock
1992	The Waterdance	Biker #1
1992	The Player	Himself
1992	Bonnie & Clyde: The True Story	Buck Barrow
1992	Adventures in Spying	Slater
1994	Beverly Hills Cop III	Fletch
1994	Love and a .45	Ranger X
1995	Real Ghosts	Bobby Mackey
1997	Cupid	Mike Logan
1997	Excess Baggage	Gus
1997	Jackie Brown	Detective Mark Dargus
1998	Letters from a Killer	Parker
1998	Gideon	Billy Ray Turner
1999	Natural Selection	Willie Dickenson
1999	Me and Will	George
1999	Magnolia	Rick Spector
2001	Final Payback	Steve Ghallagher
2003	Kill Bill: Volume 1	Buck
2004	Walking Tall	Sheriff Stan Watkins
2004	Kill Bill: Volume 2	Buck
2004	Kill Bill: The Whole Bloody Affair	Buck
2004	After the Sunset	FBI Driver
2005	Lethal Eviction	Lewis
2005	Self Medicated	Dan Jones
2005	Chandler Hall	Richard
2005	The Work and the Glory: American Zion	Robert Johnson
2006	The Lost	Detective Charlie Schilling
2006	The Work and the Glory III: A House Divided	Robert Johnson
2007	The Death and Life of Bobby Z	Duke
2008	Autopsy	Travis
2008	Deadgirl	Clint
2009	The Hessen Affair	Ben Cassidy
2009	Cabin Fever 2: Spring Fever	Principal Sinclair
2009	The Last House on the Left	Officer Morton
2011	Brawler	Rex Baker
2011	Echo Park Love Story	The Guitar Maker
2011	Apart	Teddy Berg
2011	The Perfect Student	Detective Walker
2012	Django Unchained	Tracker
2012	Slumber Party Slaughter	Mod Man
2012	Soda Springs	Larry
2013	Deep Dark Canyon	Randy Cavanaugh
2013	All Cheerleaders Die	Larry
2013	Duke	Sergeant Roman
2017	House by the Lake	Harry
2020	A Soldier's Revenge	Feldman

=== Television ===
Year	Title	Role	Notes
1983	Knight Rider	Bobby Shell	Episode: "Return to Cadiz"
1985	Highway to Heaven	Jack Harm	Episode: "Plane Death"
1989	21 Jump Street	Charlie Sharp	Episode: "High High"
1990	China Beach	Stepakoff	Episode: "One Small Step"
1992	Matlock	Jay Reynolds	Episodes: "The Assassination: Part 1" and "Part 2"
1994	ER	Dante Valerio	Episode: "The Gift"
1996	NYPD Blue	David Tierney	Episode: "A Tushful of Dollars"
1997	JAG	Denny	Episode: "Full Engagement"
2001	The X-Files	Dwight Cooper	Episode: "Surekill"
2003–2010	CSI: Crime Scene Investigation	Marty Cooperman / Jason Richter	Episodes: "Jackpot" and "Cold Blooded"
2006–2007	Lost	Danny Pickett	7 episodes
2009	Criminal Minds	Tommy Anderson	Episode: "Haunted"
2009	Dark Blue	Dan Kemp	Episode: "Ice"
2010	Scoundrels	Charlie	5 episodes
2012	Revolution	Ray Kinsey	Episode: "The Plague Dogs"
2012–2013	Breaking Bad	Jack Welker	7 episodes
2014	Raising Hope	Mullet	Episode: "How I Met Your Mullet"
2016	Gotham	Matches Malone	Episode: "This Ball of Mud and Meanness"
2016, 2022	Animal Kingdom	Vin	3 episodes
2020	Beef House	Brad	Episode: "Army Buddy Brad"
2021	Grey's Anatomy	Roy Davis	Episode: "With a Little Help from My Friends"
2022	Law & Order: Organized Crime	Guard	Episode: "Spirit in the Sky"
