= Spy Intervention =

2020 American action comedy spy film directed by Drew Mylrea

- DVD cover
- Directed by: Drew Mylrea
- Written by: Mark Famiglietti; Lane Garrison
- Produced by: Ryan R. Johnson; Sunil Perkash; Martin Sprock; Anil Yadav; Akaash Yadav
- Starring: Drew Van Acker; Poppy Delevingne; Natasha Bassett; Max Silvestri; Brittany Furlan; Blake Anderson
- Cinematography: Danny Grunes
- Edited by: Drew Mylrea
- Music by: Roger Suen
- Production companies: Fry Cook Productions; El Ride Productions; Wildfire Productions
- Distributed by: Cinedigm; Sprockefeller Pictures
- Release date: February 14, 2020
- Running time: 93 minutes
- Country: United States
- Language: English

Spy Intervention is a 2020 American action comedy spy film directed by Drew Mylrea and written by Mark Famiglietti and Lane Garrison. The film stars Drew Van Acker, Poppy Delevingne, and Blake Anderson.

The film was released on selected theaters, digital, and on demand, simultaneously on February 14, 2020.

== Plot ==
The world's greatest spy decides to abandon his adventurous lifestyle for the woman of his dreams. But when a madman tries to secure a devastating weapon, he soon gives up his boring existence to save not only the world, but his listless marriage.

== Cast ==
- Drew Van Acker as Corey Gage
- Poppy Delevingne as Pam Grayson
- Blake Anderson as Smuts
- Natasha Bassett as Alexandria
- Brittany Furlan as Brianna Brown
- Brian Sacca as Bob
- Dave Sheridan as Rick
- Lane Garrison as Fred

== Reception ==
On the review aggregator website Rotten Tomatoes, 33% of 6 critics' reviews are positive.

Leslie Felperin of The Guardian rated it 1/5 stars writing that "presumably it's meant to be a larky spoof of spy movies and marital romance - except without any of the cool gadgets, sense of danger, charm or sexual chemistry you'd expect." On Film Threat, Bobby LePire scored the film a 6.5/10 writing in his review consensus section: "the first hour of the movie is entirely worth, the ending fizzles out without much fanfare."

== See also ==
- List of spy films
- List of comedy films of the 2020s
- List of action films of the 2020s
