= Home Sick =

- Directed by: Adam Wingard
- Written by: E. L. Katz
- Produced by: E. L. Katz; Peter Katz
- Cinematography: Andor Becsi; Michael "Bear" Praytor
- Music by: Zombi
- Production company: Population 1280 Films
- Distributed by: Synapse Films
- Release date: July 14, 2007 (Fantasia)
- Running time: 89 minutes
- Country: United States
- Language: English

Home Sick is a 2007 American independent horror film written by E. L. Katz and directed by Adam Wingard in his directorial debut.

The film had its world premiere at the 2007 Fantasia International Film Festival.

== Plot ==
A strange man crashes a party and asks each person to name the person they hate. With some prodding, they all answer the stranger. When the named people die in horrible ways, the party-goers suspect that the stranger is a spree killer.

== Cast ==
- Will Akers as Robert
- Brandon Carroll as Devin
- Patrick Engel as Mathew
- Shaina Fewell as Alexis
- Jeff Dylan Graham as Ben
- L.C. Holt as Anthony
- E. L. Katz as The Cashier
- Matt Lero as Tim
- Bill Moseley as "Mr. Suitcase"
- Forrest Pitts as Mark
- Lindley Praytor as Claire (as Lindley Evans)
- Tiffany Shepis as Candice
- Jonathan Thornton as Boss
- Tom Towles as Uncle Johnny
- XZanthia as Call Girl #1

== Production ==
The film took almost six years to be released in its final cut.

== Release ==
Home Sick director's cut debuted on 14 July 2007 at the Fantasia International Film Festival, and opened in other film festivals on the dates given below.

Region	Release date	Festival
Canada	July 14, 2007	Fantasia International Film Festival
United States	October 6, 2007	Cinema Wasteland Convention

=== Home release ===
Home Sick was released on DVD in the United States on August 26, 2008.

== Reception ==
Bloody Disgusting rated it 3/5 stars and wrote that the film is "absolutely worth the wait. It’s not the best low budget horror film to ever come along but it definitely hits a home run with the special effects work". Adam Tyner of DVD Talk rated it 3/5 stars and called it "sick, twisted, and really offbeat." Paul Pritchard of DVD Verdict criticized the film for its focus on gore over story.
