= House by the Lake =

House By the Lake
- Directed by: Adam Gierasch
- Written by: Josh Burnell
- Produced by: Jace Anderson; Brian Cooperman; Mike De Trana; Gary King
- Starring: James Callis; Anne Dudek; Michael Bowen; Amiah Miller; Natasha Bassett
- Cinematography: Mitchell H. Anderson Jr.
- Edited by: Andrew Cohen; Josh Ethier
- Music by: Adam Barber
- Production company: Anvil Entertainment
- Release date: October 10, 2017
- Country: United States
- Language: English

House By the Lake is an American horror film directed by Adam Gierasch and written by Josh Burnell. The film stars James Callis, Anne Dudek, Michael Bowen, and Amiah Miller. It was released on October 10, 2017.

== Synopsis ==
Scott and Karen are a couple who have been experiencing trouble in their marriage. The two are advised to try and mend their marriage, particularly as the strain seems to have been having a strong impact on their young, autistic daughter Emma. The family decides to travel to a remote lake house to get away from it all and their issues, also hiring a new nanny named Gwen. This seems to do little to help the couple and as tensions in the house grow, Emma begins to mention making a new friend she calls the Fish Man. Her parents and nanny assume that Emma is referring to a new, unusual imaginary friend, however strange occurrences start making them question whether he is real or imaginary. They also grow concerned when Emma begins to change; as her prior fear of water begins to lessen, she is suddenly able to breathe underwater, and mentions that the Fish Man is going to return for her.

== Cast ==
- James Callis as Scott
- Anne Dudek as Karen
- Michael Bowen as Harry
- Amiah Miller as Emma
- Natasha Bassett as Gwen
- Lee Garlington as Dr. Llewelyn

== Production ==
In August 2015, it was announced that principal photography on the film had begun in Big Bear Lake, California. The film was being directed by Adam Gierasch, based on the script by Josh Burnell. The film would star James Callis, Anne Dudek, Michael Bowen, and Amiah Miller. Mike De Trana would produce the film through Anvil Entertainment along with Gary King and Jace Anderson.

When writing the script Burnell researched autism in order to ensure that the film's portrayal of Emma was genuine; one of the aspects incorporated into the film was that the actress portraying Emma would not make eye contact with others.

== Release ==
House by the Lake was released to video on demand and streaming on October 10, 2017.

== Reception ==
Dread Central rated House by the Lake at 3/5 stars, praising the performances, location, and atmosphere of the film. Shariq Ansari of High on Films also reviewed the film, praising its ending and writing that "The movie also does a great job in establishing a role reversal, its only motive. The parents, who are supposed to be Emma’s guardians, not only on the basis of biology, turn into the spectres of this film."
