= The Others (American TV series) =

- Genre: Science fiction
- Created by: John Brancato and Michael Ferris
- Starring: Julianne Nicholson; Gabriel Macht; Melissa Crider; Bill Cobbs; John Billingsley; Kevin J. O'Connor; John Aylward
- Country of origin: United States
- Original language: English
- No. of seasons: 1
- No. of episodes: 13

Production
- Executive producers: John Brancato; Michael Ferris; Glen Morgan; James Wong
- Producer: Sarah Caplan
- Running time: 40 minutes
- Production companies: Delusional Films; NBC Studios; DreamWorks Television

Original release
- Network: NBC
- Release: February 5 – June 10, 2000

The Others is an American science fiction television series created by John Brancato and Michael Ferris, and produced by Delusional Films, NBC Studios, and DreamWorks Television. It ran for thirteen 40-minute episodes from February 5, 2000, to June 10, 2000, airing on NBC. It concerned a group of people with various psychic talents as they encountered different, and often evil, paranormal forces. It was an ensemble series. It was part of the third attempt by NBC to air a Saturday night thriller programming block, joining The Pretender and Profiler as the Thrillogy, but all three shows were canceled by season's end to make way for the newly formed XFL.

== Premise ==
Marian Kitt, a university student, is forced to come to terms with her frequently unwanted paranormal abilities, attempting to do so by joining The Others, a group with similar talents. The series gradually built up an overall storyline of a strong evil power targeting the group.

== Cast ==
- Julianne Nicholson as Marian Kitt
- Gabriel Macht as Mark Gabriel
- Missy Crider (credited as 'Melissa Crider') as Ellen "Satori" Pawlowski
- Bill Cobbs as Elmer Greentree
- John Billingsley as Professor Miles Ballard
- Kevin J. O'Connor as Warren Day
- John Aylward as Albert McGonagle

== Episodes ==
Note that the episodes are listed in production code order instead of broadcast order.

List of The Others episodes
No.	Title	Directed by	Written by	Original release date	Prod. code
1	"Pilot"	Mick Garris	John Brancato and Michael Ferris	February 5, 2000	26-99-100
A group of people with psychic/supernatural abilities gather daily, but now have a rookie named Marian Kitt who is skeptical about her own abilities.
2	"Luciferous"	Mick Garris	Glen Morgan and James Wong	March 11, 2000	26-99-101
Marian moves into her new apartment, but begins avoiding everyone, although Albert and Warren follow her in order to protect her from an evil force living in her bedroom wallpaper.
3	"Eyes"	William Malone	Glen Morgan and James Wong	February 19, 2000	26-99-102
After receiving laser eye surgery, a man develops the ability to see demons.
4	"1112"	Bill Condon	Glen Morgan and James Wong	March 4, 2000	26-99-103
A woman grieving over her late husband does not realize it is preventing her husband from resting in peace. The Others must find a way to help the woman to move on.
5	"Unnamed"	Brian Trenchard-Smith	John Brancato and Michael Ferris	February 12, 2000	26-99-104
The Others must rescue an abducted young boy from a murderer exploiting his supernatural powers. Guest starring J. E. Freeman and Zachary Quinto.
6	"Souls on Board"	Tobe Hooper	Daniel Arkin	February 26, 2000	26-99-105
When the Others take a flight to a paranormal conference, they find their aircraft haunted by the dead crew and passengers of a plane that crashed on the same flight path. Guest starring Dale Dye and Adam Gierasch.
7	"The Ones That Lie in Wait"	Thomas J. Wright	Glen Morgan and James Wong	April 22, 2000	26-99-106
The Others are trapped by a mysterious entity that has a history with Elmer.
8	"Don't Dream It's Over"	Mick Garris	Mick Garris	March 25, 2000	26-99-107
Mark falls in love with a mysterious woman who haunts his dreams. Guest starring Clive Barker.
9	"Mora"	Jake Paltrow	John Brancato and Michael Ferris	June 10, 2000	26-99-108
A Russian legend attacks the hospital where Mark works, killing many, and Mark could be next.
10	"Theta"	Tom McLoughlin	Fred Golan	March 18, 2000	26-99-109
Marian finds a girl causing problems for others and tries to help fix this, but there might be more to this girl than meets the eye.
11	"Till Then"	Bryan Spicer	Glen Morgan and James Wong	April 29, 2000	26-99-110
Elmer wrestles with his past after the government hires him to find a pilot shot down and stranded in the Iraqi desert, something complicated by the ghost of a World War II airman. Guest starring Tucker Smallwood.
12	"$4.95 a Minute"	Sanford Bookstaver	Richard Whitley	May 6, 2000	26-99-111
A phony psychic comes to the Others for help when his predictions start coming true - with terrible consequences. Guest starring James Morrison, Darin Morgan, and Randy Stone.
13	"Life Is for the Living"	Thomas J. Wright	Daniel Arkin	May 13, 2000	26-99-112
The Ones That Lie in Wait are back and manipulate everyone against each other.

== Production ==
The series' writers included Glen Morgan and James Wong, who were also executive producers for the series along with Brancato and Ferris. Morgan's wife Kristen Cloke played the significant role of Allison/The Woman in the episodes "The Ones That Lie in Wait" and "Life Is for the Living". Tobe Hooper directed one episode, "Souls on Board", and Bill Condon directed the episode "1112".

The series was filmed at Paramount Studios. The pilot episode was filmed in Vancouver, British Columbia, Canada.

Brancato wrote in his personal blog in 2009, "Mike and I'd had a dismal few years. We'd created a TV show, only to have it run into the ground by a pair of loathsome show-runners."

== Broadcast ==
The series aired on Five in the UK, and on Nine in Australia.

== Reception ==
Michael Speier of Variety was indifferent on the first episode of the series, saying that "the roles here are one-note: no humor and no sparks, just a lot of paranoia", but adding "Bill Condon ("Gods and Monsters) and Tobe Hooper ("Poltergeist") have already wrapped upcoming episodes, and it’s hoped their styles will generate bigger oohs and aahs than the Mick Garris-helmed pilot." Howard Rosenberg of Los Angeles Times was more openly critical of the series, declaring "There’s nothing especially thoughtful or suspenseful here, for example, and Episodes 1 and 2, after raising expectations of creepiness, both end with soft thuds." By contrast, Bruce Fretts of Entertainment Weekly gave the series a favorable review, commenting The Others "has a bewitching cast that mixes appealing up-and-comers (including Melissa Crider...) with reliable old-timers (like the always-wonderful Bill Cobbs...)", adding that the series was "compellingly creepy".
