= Trafficked (2017 film) =

- Directed by: Will Wallace
- Written by: Siddharth Kara
- Produced by: Vicente Aldape; Conroy Kanter; Siddharth Kara; Will Wallace
- Starring: Ashley Judd; Sean Patrick Flanery; Anne Archer
- Cinematography: Thomas L. Callaway
- Edited by: Justin Thomas Billings
- Music by: David Das
- Release date: October 6, 2017 (limited)
- Running time: 104 minutes
- Country: United States
- Language: English
- Box office: $19,698

Trafficked is a 2017 American thriller drama film directed by Will Wallace and starring Ashley Judd, Sean Patrick Flanery and Anne Archer.

== Plot ==
In California, Sara is eighteen and has to leave her foster home; she is offered training to be a waitress working on cruise ships. She accepts, but instead is sold to sex traffickers by Diane. In India, young teen Amba is partying with her friends when a guy she'd rejected tries to hit on her again. He is thrown out. On her way back home, he throws acid on her and her friend. Her friend is facially disfigured and Amba's hand is scarred. Then he forces Amba to be sold into sex slavery. Sara and Amba both wind up together in a Texas brothel with Mali, from Nigeria, and are raped repeatedly. Mali tells them to do what they can to survive, and not to fight back. Amba, hopeless, listens, but Sara resists and is beaten and drugged. Amba gets pregnant and Simon (Sean Patrick Flanery), the owner of the brothel, finds out and makes her take pills to have an abortion. She loses a lot of blood and Mali pleads with Simon to call a doctor.

He does, and Sara discreetly begs the doctor for some sleeping pills "for her friend." He relents.

Sara plots with Amba and Mali to escape. She tells them that Simon is going away with the rest of his men for the night, and only Max, one of the guards, will be left. Sara says that they could catch a train nearby. Mali agrees, but Amba, still depressed over her abortion, says that she won't leave. She thinks her family would be too ashamed of her when they find out what she's been doing.

Sara puts in the sleeping pills in Max's drink, and once he's asleep, she sneaks out with Mali. Amba changes her mind and goes with them. Sara grabs the keys to the front gate from Max, but he awakens and chokes her. Mali hits him and knocks him out, and the three girls run.

They get to the train station, but are too late; the train has already left. Mali trips and injures her ankle. Meanwhile, Simon has found out they escaped and runs back. Gameboy, another guard, searches the station, which is also a truck stop, and hears Mali's yells of pain. Mali tells Amba and Sara to run away, and they finally do, reluctant to leave her. Mali is captured and Sara and Amba run and hide in a truck. They are taken to a bus station, where they buy two tickets. They get in the bus and see Simon, who has tracked them there and is searching the buses. They duck and hide and manage to evade him. Sara is reunited with her younger sister and Amba calls her family, who are overjoyed to hear from her. Simon and Diane are arrested, along with everyone else involved in trafficking. As for Mali, she is shown with a group of prostitutes, holding one of them and crying as the one she was holding is taken away.

== Cast ==
- Ashley Judd as Diane
- Anne Archer as Mother Monica
- Patrick Duffy as Christian
- Elisabeth Röhm as Rachel Anderson
- Sean Patrick Flanery as Simon
- Brian Thompson as Max
- Efren Ramirez as Enrique
- Matt Doran as Gameboy
- Jason London as Roy
- Madison Wolfe as Natalie
- Zak Lee Guarnaccia as Italian Trafficker
- Kelly Washington as Sara
- Amiah Miller as Young Sara
- Jessica Obilom as Mali
- Alpa Banker as Amba
- Nikki Koss as Jessie
- Duane Whitaker as Joe Mac
- Courtney Gains as Frank Anderson
- Hina X. Khan as Jyoti
- Rodrigo Trevino as Jesus
- Kayla Vosburg as Butter

== Controversy ==
Actresses alleged that they were bruised in an unusually physical audition; one alleged that a simulated rape scene was performed on her without warning, and the director, Will Wallace, was removed from the project during post production over a disagreement involving the depiction of rape.

== Reception ==
On review aggregator Rotten Tomatoes, the film has an approval rating of 29% based on 7 reviews, with an average rating of 4.3/10. Jeffrey M. Anderson of Common Sense Media awarded the film one star out of five.
