= Anastasia: Once Upon a Time =

2020 film by Blake Harris

- Film poster
- Directed by: Blake Harris
- Written by: Blake Harris
- Produced by: Armando Gutierrez; Eli Lipnik; Bret Jones
- Starring: Emily Carey; Amiah Miller; Brandon Routh; Armando Gutierrez; Claire Crosby
- Cinematography: Dean Cundey
- Edited by: Colleen Halsey; Richard Halsey
- Music by: Jeremy Rubolino; Nami Melumad
- Production company: Conglomerate Media
- Distributed by: Freestyle Digital Media
- Release date: April 7, 2020
- Country: United States
- Language: English

Anastasia: Once Upon a Time is a 2020 American fantasy-adventure film very loosely based on the legend of Anastasia Nikolaevna Romanova of Russia. The film stars Armando Gutierrez as Grigori Rasputin, Jo Koy as Vladimir Lenin, Brandon Routh as Tsar Nicholas II Alexandrovich Romanov of Russia and Emily Carey as Anastasia. The film was released through digital platforms on April 7, 2020.

== Plot ==
In 1917, thirteen-year-old Anastasia Nikolaevna Romanova, a Russian Grand Duchess (Velíkaya Knyazhná), escapes through a portal created by her family's old friend, Grigori Rasputin, when her family is threatened by the Bolsheviks, led by Vladimir Lenin.

Anastasia finds herself in the United States seventy-years later in 1989, while in a suburban neighborhood. However, Anastasia is unaware that an enchantress, Yara, is working with Lenin. She has hypnotized Rasputin, sending him through another portal to capture her.

Anastasia is befriended by Megan, a thirteen-year-old girl who has recently moved and feels lonely as she has no friends. Despite Anastasia's initially fragmentary grasp of English, she introduces herself to Megan as "Annie", aided by an amulet Rasputin gave her that glows when she is in the presence of a person she can trust. As Anastasia's understanding of English grows, Megan finds her a place to stay in a currently-vacant house near Megan's own, and the two even manage to befriend a pop star giving a concert in a nearby mall who helps buy Anastasia contemporary clothing.

Eventually, Anastasia is able to tell Megan the truth about herself when she finds a book on the Romanov family's fate, but is disturbed to learn of their apparent deaths. Trying to cheer Anastasia up, Megan offers her one of a pair of "best friend" bracelets she bought herself in the past, as she had never had anyone to share them with.

When the two girls go to a haunted house party on Halloween, Anastasia is captured by Rasputin when she and Megan are separated. Megan's school bullies initially convince her that Annie left her and the party on her own, but later, when she sees a live local news report of a traffic accident, Megan spots Annie and Rasputin in the background and realizes what actually happened. Tracking them to the park where she first met Anastasia, Megan is able to help distract Rasputin long enough for Anastasia to open a new portal, allowing her to go back to a few moments before her original trip into the future and help her family escape Lenin's forces, with Rasputin staying behind to buy them time to escape.

Back in 1989, Megan is once again disappointed at the loss of her friend, but when her mother suggests she introduce herself to the new neighbors, she is overjoyed to realize that the elderly grandmother of the new family next door is Anastasia herself, now at eighty-three years of age. Anastasia invites her inside to tell her everything that happened to her since their last meeting.

== Cast ==
- Emily Carey as Grand Duchess (Velíkaya Knyazhná) Anastasia Nikolaevna Romanova
- Amiah Miller as Megan
- Brandon Routh as Tsar Nicholas II Alexandrovich Romanov
- Aliyah Moulden as Bliss
- Armando Gutierrez as Grigori Rasputin
- Kendall Vertes as Beatrice
- Donna Murphy as Yara the Enchantress
- Jo Koy as Vladimir Lenin
- Lee Tae-ri as Prince Lee
- Haley Swindal as Tsarina Alexandra Feodorovna Romanova

== Production ==
Principal production began in the summer of 2017 in Louisville, KY with the young stars filming the 1988 portion of the film. Shooting on the 1917 portion of the film started in August 2017 and concluded in April 2018 after a break in between filming locations of approximately 6 months due to the scheduling of the location the Rosecliff, and its actors Jo Koy and Brandon Routh.

== Reception ==
The Dove Foundation said that the "film includes a strong message of friendship and sacrificial love." Russia Beyond lambasted the film highlighting the negative portrayal of Russians and its handling of the tragic true story. Regarding the merits of the film itself, Tom Whitcomb at The Bozho reviewed the film negatively, writing, "The acting is wooden and uninspired; the shoddy accents make me understand why everyone in the HBO miniseries Chernobyl stayed British. The production design is phoned in. The script was in serious need of several rewrites."
