= Britney Ever After =

2017 television film

- Promotional poster
- Genre: Drama; Biography
- Based on: Life of Britney Spears
- Written by: Anne-Marie Hess
- Directed by: Leslie Libman
- Starring: Natasha Bassett; Nathan Keyes; Nicole Oliver; Matthew Harrison; Peter Benson
- Composer: Danny Lux
- Country of origin: United States
- Original language: English

Production
- Producers: Harvey Kahn; Leslie Libman; Charles Pugliese
- Cinematography: Adam Sliwinski
- Editor: Daria Ellerman
- Running time: 120 minutes
- Production companies: Asylum Entertainment; Side Street Post

Original release
- Network: Lifetime
- Release: February 18, 2017

Britney Ever After is a 2017 American biographical drama television film directed by Leslie Libman and written by Anne-Marie Hess. It is based on the life of Britney Spears. The film stars Natasha Bassett, Nathan Keyes, Nicole Oliver, Matthew Harrison and Peter Benson. The film premiered on Lifetime on February 18, 2017.

The film is an unofficial biopic, as neither Spears nor her team had any involvement with the project. When asked about the project during its production phase, Spears' representative said that Spears would "not be contributing in any way, shape or form to the Lifetime biopic...nor does it have her blessing." The film was panned by the critics for its inaccuracies, performances and screenplay.

== Plot ==
The film is a loose retelling of the life of pop superstar Britney Spears. It starts from the beginning of her career not including The Mickey Mouse Club. It also goes into her relationship with Justin Timberlake. The film also covers her marriage to Kevin Federline, her downward spiral and ends with her performing at her residency in Las Vegas. The film did not use any of Spears' songs, due to the singer and her team not consenting to the film's production.

== Cast ==
- Natasha Bassett as Britney Spears
- Nathan Keyes as Justin Timberlake
- Nicole Oliver as Lynne Spears
- Matthew Harrison as Jamie Spears
- Peter Benson as Larry Rudolph
- Clayton Chitty as Kevin Federline
- Jillian Walchuck as Paris Hilton
- Markian Tarasiuk as Wade Robson
- Connor Paton as Lance Bass
- Matt Visser as Joey Fatone
- Lindsay Gibson as Felicia Culotta
- Kyle Warren as Jesse Lozano
- Emma Johnson as Alli Sims
- Josie Bulbrook as Jamie Lynn Spears
- Zac Vran as JC Chasez
- Elinet Louicius as Jamie Foxx
- Serge Jaswal as Adnan
- Harrison MacDonald as Reg Jones
- Tamara Thorsen as Jenna Dewan
- Frankie Cena as Chris Kirkpatrick
- Kelly McCabe as Jason Allen Alexander
- Benjamin Arce as Sam Lutfi
- Mason Fairhurst as Sean Preston Federline
- Rees Townsend as Jayden James Federline

== Reception ==
The film was critically panned upon release. One writer for NME called the film a "car crash" and criticized it for its numerous inaccuracies and choice of casting. Billboard criticized the film for having "too many pieces missing." The Guardian gave a more mixed review of the film, calling it "tacky, but oddly compelling."

The film was watched by 1.01 million viewers and held a 0.4 rating among viewers 18–49.
