= Cheap Thrills (film) =

- Theatrical release poster
- Directed by: E. L. Katz
- Written by: Trent Haaga; David Chirchirillo
- Produced by: Gabriel Cowan; Travis Stevens; John Suits
- Starring: Pat Healy; Sara Paxton; Ethan Embry; David Koechner
- Cinematography: Andrew Wheeler; Sebastian Winterø Hansen
- Edited by: Brody Gusar
- Music by: Mads Heldtberg
- Production companies: New Artists Alliance; Snowfort Pictures
- Distributed by: Drafthouse Films
- Release dates: March 8, 2013 (SXSW); March 21, 2014 (United States)
- Running time: 85 minutes
- Country: United States
- Language: English
- Budget: $100,000
- Box office: $59,424 (US)

Cheap Thrills is a 2013 American black comedy thriller film directed by E. L. Katz in his directorial debut. It stars Pat Healy, Sara Paxton, Ethan Embry and David Koechner. The film follows two friends competing in a series of challenges worth different amounts of money given by a rich couple. It premiered at South by Southwest (SXSW) on March 8, 2013, and was acquired by Drafthouse Films and Snoot Entertainment. It was released on March 21, 2014, in the United States. Cheap Thrills received generally positive reviews from critics but was a box-office bomb, grossing $59,424 against a $100,000 budget.

== Plot ==
Auto mechanic Craig loses his job and cannot pay his rent. After seeing the eviction sign, he goes to a dive bar and meets an old friend from high school, Vince. They later meet a rich couple, Colin and Violet, who, after becoming aware of Craig's dire financial situation, offer them money in return for completing certain tasks to entertain Violet, as it is her birthday.

As the first task, Colin offers fifty dollars to whoever between Craig and Vince can drink a shot he pours first. From there, the danger of the tasks escalates along with the payout. The dares result in a bouncer confronting Craig, who is offered five hundred dollars by Colin to hit him first. He does so and is knocked out. When he comes to, he realizes that he has been brought to Colin and Violet's house. Tensions between Craig and Vince begin to emerge when they compete with each other in a breath-holding contest and Vince punches Craig in the stomach to prevent him from winning so that he may claim the prize money himself. Another dare between Colin and Vince involves Vince urinating on Craig's shoes. When Craig angrily goes to clean up in the bathroom, Vince accompanies him and they hatch a plan to rob the couple. Vince divulges that there is $250,000, which he instructs Craig to steal as the safe is unlocked.

At knife-point, Vince gets Colin to reveal that the safe is unlocked. Craig retrieves the money and returns, only to have Colin and Violet turn the tables on them when Colin easily disarms Vince as Vince is not aware that Colin is an award-winning martial artist and Violet has a gun with her. Colin and Violet agree to let "bygones be bygones" and reveals the money is actually prepared for them to have but only if they go through with the game, which explains why the safe is unlocked. Another dare involves Craig having sex with Violet as well as getting $4,500, the amount required to pay for Craig's month's rent. This angers Vince, who views it as an unfair bet, increasing hostilities between the two friends. Humiliated and feeling guilty for cheating on his wife, Craig withdraws from the game and departs, having earned enough money to delay homelessness for the time being. Violet, who seems to have begun to develop feelings for him, is upset and becomes withdrawn, causing the game to end as its purpose was to entertain her. Vince, desperate to win more money, offers to perform anything asked of him. Colin suggests the amputation of his pinkie finger for $25,000. Just as Vince is about to accept, Craig returns to the game, stating that he only temporarily solved his problem with the $4,500 he has earned so far, and offers to do the same dare for a smaller sum. Vince also goes lower, and they go back and forth until Craig settles for $15,000. Vince cuts Craig's pinkie off, resulting in Craig winning again, which only serves to anger Vince further.

The next challenge involves eating a cooked dead dog, which had died while trying to eat Craig's finger, with the winner who finishes his portion first receiving $50,000. The contest results in a draw, and the tie is broken by whoever eats Craig's finger. Craig wins but he is beaten up by an enraged Vince. After being taken outside to calm down by Colin, he suggests that Vince kill Craig for the remaining portion of the $250,000. Vince considers the offer but finds himself unable to kill his friend; he urges Craig to leave with him but is then shot to death by Craig. Colin calls Craig a taxi and he leaves with his winnings in hand. After he has left, Colin pays Violet her money, as the two had made a bet on which friend would kill the other; Colin chose Vince with Violet choosing Craig. Craig arrives home, comforting his child, when the light turns on and his wife appears, staring at Craig covered in blood and at the money strewn all over the room.

== Cast ==
- Pat Healy as Craig Daniels
- Sara Paxton as Violet
- Ethan Embry as Vince
- David Koechner as Colin
- Amanda Fuller as Audrey Daniels
- Brighton Sharbino as Luann
- Todd Farmer as a security guard

== Production ==
Cheap Thrills was the first feature-film directed by E. L. Katz. After premiering at South by Southwest, a day-long auction took place for rights to the film in a rare bidding war. Drafthouse Films, partnered with Snoot Entertainment, won the auction. Drafthouse Films planned on releasing the film theatrically on limited screens. It later screened at the Boston Underground Film Festival and the Fantasia International Film Festival. Drafthouse Films released Cheap Thrills on DVD/Blu-ray May 27, 2014 which included a 45-minute documentary called "Vital Heat: The Making of Cheap Thrills".

== Reception ==
On Rotten Tomatoes the film has a score of 87% based on reviews from 95 critics, with an average rating of 6.9/10. The consensus states "Gleefully nasty and darkly hilarious, Cheap Thrills lives down to its title in the best possible way." On Metacritic, the film has a score of 63 out of 100, based on 23 critics, indicating "generally favorable" reviews.

Joe Leydon, writing for Variety, said that film "is a thoroughly nasty piece of work, which doubtless will be the strongest selling point for this worst-case scenario about steadily escalating dares and degradations". John Defore, of The Hollywood Reporter, said that the film is "one of the most involving works of cinematic misanthropy in years". Defore compared the film to Indecent Proposal and The Most Dangerous Game. Scott Weinberg, of the online horror website Fearnet, said, "Cheap Thrills breezes by on a twisted idea, a fantastic cast, and a bunch of ethical quandaries that are both eerily uncomfortable and slyly fascinating at the same time." Simon Foster of SBS Films said, "A textbook case of a film that never quite amounts to the sum of its parts, Cheap Thrills is still more than its title suggests and provides dark entertainment for those in the mood."
