= Pop Skull =

- Film Poster
- Directed by: Adam Wingard
- Written by: Lane Hughes; E. L. Katz; Adam Wingard
- Produced by: Lane Hughes; E. L. Katz; Peter Katz; Adam Wingard
- Starring: Lane Hughes; E. L. Katz; Adam Wingard
- Cinematography: Adam Wingard
- Edited by: Adam Wingard
- Music by: Jasper Lee; Kyle McKinnon
- Distributed by: HALO 8 Entertainment
- Release dates: October 7, 2007 (RFF); November 2, 2007 (AFI); July 21, 2008 (NZIFF)
- Running time: 86 minutes
- Country: United States
- Language: English
- Budget: $2,000

Pop Skull is a 2007 American independent film directed, co-produced, and edited by Adam Wingard, who co-wrote the screenplay with Lane Hughes and E. L. Katz. It stars Hughes, Katz, and Wingard. It is primarily regarded as a horror film but has been noted for incorporating elements of genres such as drama, psychedelic, romance, and thriller.

== Premise ==
Daniel, a young Mexican-American pill addict living in Alabama, finds that his attempts to cope with his day-to-day trials collide with the increasing influence of the murderous and displaced spirits that inhabit his home.

== Cast ==
- Lane Hughes as Daniel
- E. L. Katz as Eddie
- Adam Wingard as Raymond
- Jeff Dylan Graham as Matt Tepper
- Maggie Henry as Natalie
- Hannah Hughes as Morgan
- Brandon Carroll as Jeff
- L. C. Holt as Victor
- Jennifer Price as Mom
- Benjamin Riley as Himself (credited as Ben Schmitt)
- Debbie Stefanov as Abby

== Production ==
In 2003, Wingard approached Hughes with the idea of making a semi-autobiographical film about a recent breakup. They conceived the film as "one-part psychedelic, one-part horror, and one-part romance" and made it on an extremely low budget of $2,000.

== Release ==
Pop Skull screened at the Rome Film Festival, American Film Institute's AFI Fest, and the New Zealand International Film Festival.

== Reception ==
Reviews were generally mixed to positive. LA Splash said Hughes gave "a truly magnetic Manson vibe the entire time" which allowed Wingard "to make great use of the extreme close-up". Filmmaker Stephen Susco remarked that it was "unlike any horror film you've ever seen—or will ever see", while Variety called it "powerful" and suggested it created a new genre called "acid horror". The film won the jury award at the Boston Underground Film Festival and the Grand Jury Prize at the Indianapolis International Film Festival.
