= Amiah Miller =

American actress and model (born 2004)

- Born: July 16, 2004 (age 22); Virginia, U.S.
- Occupations: Actress, model
- Years active: 2014–present

Amiah Miller (born July 16, 2004) is an American actress and model. She starred in the 2017 film War for the Planet of the Apes. She also appears in the TV series Henry Danger, Best Friends Whenever, MacGyver, and The Madison.

== Early life ==
Amiah Miller was born on July 16, 2004, to her father Merrill Miller and her mother Kaydee Miller.

Miller began her modeling career at age 8, when her family was living in Florida. Around 2014, Miller took acting training classes in Los Angeles and Orlando. Besides acting, Miller also studies Thai boxing and jujutsu.

== Career ==
In 2017, Miller had a breakout role starring in War for the Planet of the Apes, as the character Nova. She appeared on the main promotional poster for the film. She previously appeared in Lights Out (2016), playing the young version of Teresa Palmer's character. In 2017, she had roles in Trafficked and House by the Lake. On television, she appears in Henry Danger, Richie Rich, Best Friends Whenever and MacGyver.

She often plays the young version of another character, as she did in the films Lights Out and Trafficked, and in the TV series Best Friends Whenever.

In 2019, she appeared in the live-action-fantasy film Anastasia: Once Upon a Time.

== Filmography ==
=== Film ===
Year	Title	Role	Notes
2016	Lights Out	Young Rebecca	
2017	War for the Planet of the Apes	Nova	
2017	Trafficked	Young Sara	
2017	House by the Lake	Emma	
2019	Anastasia: Once Upon a Time	Megan	
2020	The Water Man	Josephine "Jo" Riley	
2022	My Best Friend's Exorcism	Gretchen Lang	
2024	Hold Your Breath	Rose Bellum	
2025	The Stranger in My Home	Katie Mitchell	

=== Television ===
Year	Title	Role	Notes
2014	Clementine	Young Clementine	Television film
2015	Henry Danger	Paula Makiato	Episode: "Spoiler Alert"
2015	Richie Rich	Noah	Episode: "$pooky $tuff"
2015	Best Friends Whenever	9-year-old Shelby	Episodes: "The Butterscotch Effect" and "When Shelby Met Cyd"
2015	How We Live	Riley	Television film
2016	MacGyver	Valerie Lawson	Episode: "Pliers"
2026	The 'Burbs	Alison Grant	1 episode
2026	The Madison	Bridgette Reese	recurring role
