= Natasha Bassett =

Australian actress

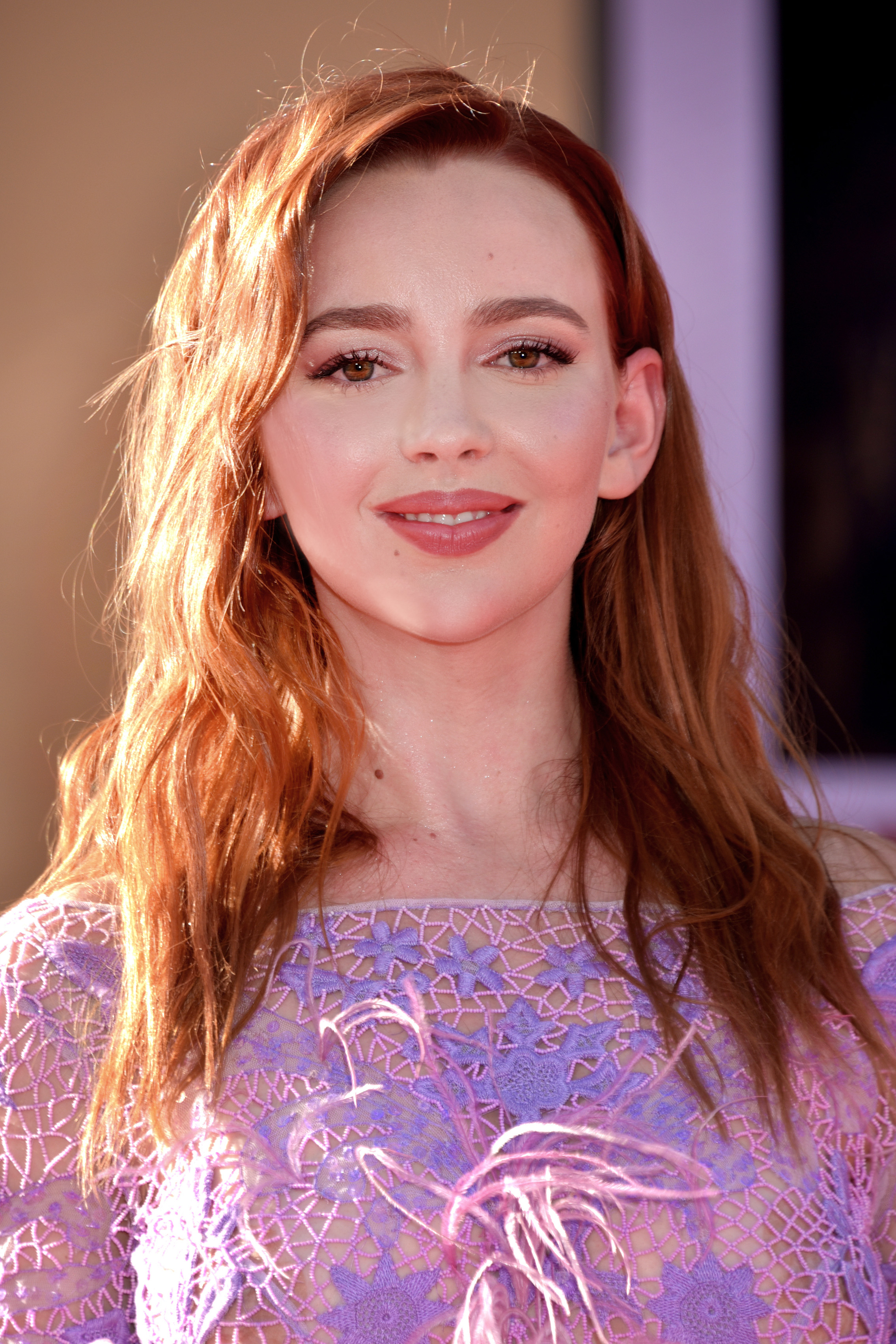
- Bassett in 2019
- Born: Sydney, Australia
- Occupation: Actress
- Years active: 2005–present
- Partner: Elon Musk (2021–2024)

Natasha Bassett is an Australian actress and screenwriter born in Sydney, New South Wales.

== Career ==
Bassett went on her first audition at 14, landed the lead role in the Australian Theatre for Young People's production of Romeo and Juliet, moving on to study, write, and perform at the National Institute of Dramatic Art. This led to Bassett performing under the artistic direction of Cate Blanchett in Sydney Theatre Company's stage production of "Bookends".

Bassett landed the lead in the MTV film Dungoona (2009) and appeared on several Australian television series, Rake (2010), Wild Boys (2011), and Cops L.A.C. (2010), while attending classes. After graduating high school, she appeared in P.J. Hogan's film Mental (2012), alongside Toni Collette and Liev Schreiber, and traveled to Paris to play the lead in the feature, The Last Goodbye (2013).

At 19, she was awarded a screenwriting scholarship from the ArtStart Screenwriters Program, where she wrote and directed her short film, Kite (2013). The short was featured in the Rhode Island International Film Festival, Balinale International Film Festival, and the Big Bear Lake International Film Festival.

Bassett moved to New York City, studied at the Atlantic Acting School, and relocated to Los Angeles for the NBC series Camp (2013). Shortly after landing, she booked Fox network sitcom No Place Like Home and made her "breakout role” as 50s-era starlet Gloria DeLamour in the Coen Bros' Hail, Caesar! (2016) with George Clooney, Scarlett Johansson and Channing Tatum.

Bassett continued to play several film roles in the United States starring in thrillers, House by the Lake, The Pale Door, Desolate, Spinning Man, opposite Guy Pearce, Pierce Brosnan and Minnie Driver, and indie drama Katie Says Goodbye with Mary Steenburgen, as well as comedy film Spy Intervention, ABC series Operation Buffalo and 12 Mighty Orphans with Luke Wilson, Martin Sheen and Robert Duvall. Bassett played Britney Spears in the Lifetime biopic Britney Ever After in 2017.

Bassett appears in Baz Luhrmann's Elvis as Dixie Locke, Elvis Presley's first girlfriend, alongside Austin Butler and Tom Hanks. To promote the film, Bassett, walked the red carpet at the Cannes Film Festival in May 2022. The film received a 10-minute standing ovation.

She portrayed the lead role in romantic comedy Don't You Be My Neighbor! opposite Abhay Deol; the film's release date is yet to be announced.

Bassett has been writing a noir thriller novel.

== Public image and acting style ==
Vanity Fair has named Bassett “The Australian Powerhouse” who "isn’t just an actress—she also writes and directs.” She was ranked on the ‘Maxim Hot 100’ list for 2022.

Bassett has been a vocal supporter of women’s rights saying that "Women are now the protagonists and won’t just be there to serve a man’s story or fill in the background,” indicating her agency for women’s progress and that it should be about men and women sharing the space.

== Personal life ==
Growing up in Australia, Bassett received the Gold Duke of Edinburgh Award for her survival trips and community service throughout the country.

She is an avid baker and was dubbed ‘LA’s Best Cookie Baker’ after winning Bakecamp competitions around Los Angeles. Her cookies are inspired by Australian desserts and nostalgic childhood flavors.

Bassett was in an on-and-off relationship with Elon Musk.

She is working towards her astrophysics degree through Harvard's Online Program, and speaks fluent French.

== Filmography ==
=== Film ===
Year	Title	Role	Notes
2012	Mental	Kay	
2013	Kite	Babysitter	short
2013	The Last Goodbye	Stella	
2016	Katie Says Goodbye	Sara	
2016	Hail, Caesar!	Gloria DeLamour	
2016	House by the Lake	Gwen	
2016	Desolate	Kayla May	
2018	Spinning Man	Carrie	
2020	Spy Intervention	Alexandra	
2020	The Pale Door	Pearl	
2020	12 Mighty Orphans	Opal	
2022	Elvis	Dixie Locke	
TBA	Don’t You Be My Neighbor!	Emily	

=== Television ===
Year	Title	Role	Notes
2009	Dungoona	Gemma	TV film
2010	I Rock	Timpani	1 episode
2010	Cops L.A.C.	Brooke Lucas	1 ep.
2011	Rake	Tara	3 ep.
2013	Camp	Chloe	9 ep.
2013	In Your Dreams	Natalie	1 ep.
2014	Here's Your Damn Family	Emma	1 ep.
2017	Britney Ever After	Britney Spears	TV film
2020	Operation Buffalo	Alice	miniseries, 5 ep.
