= Tobe Hooper =

American filmmaker (1943–2017)

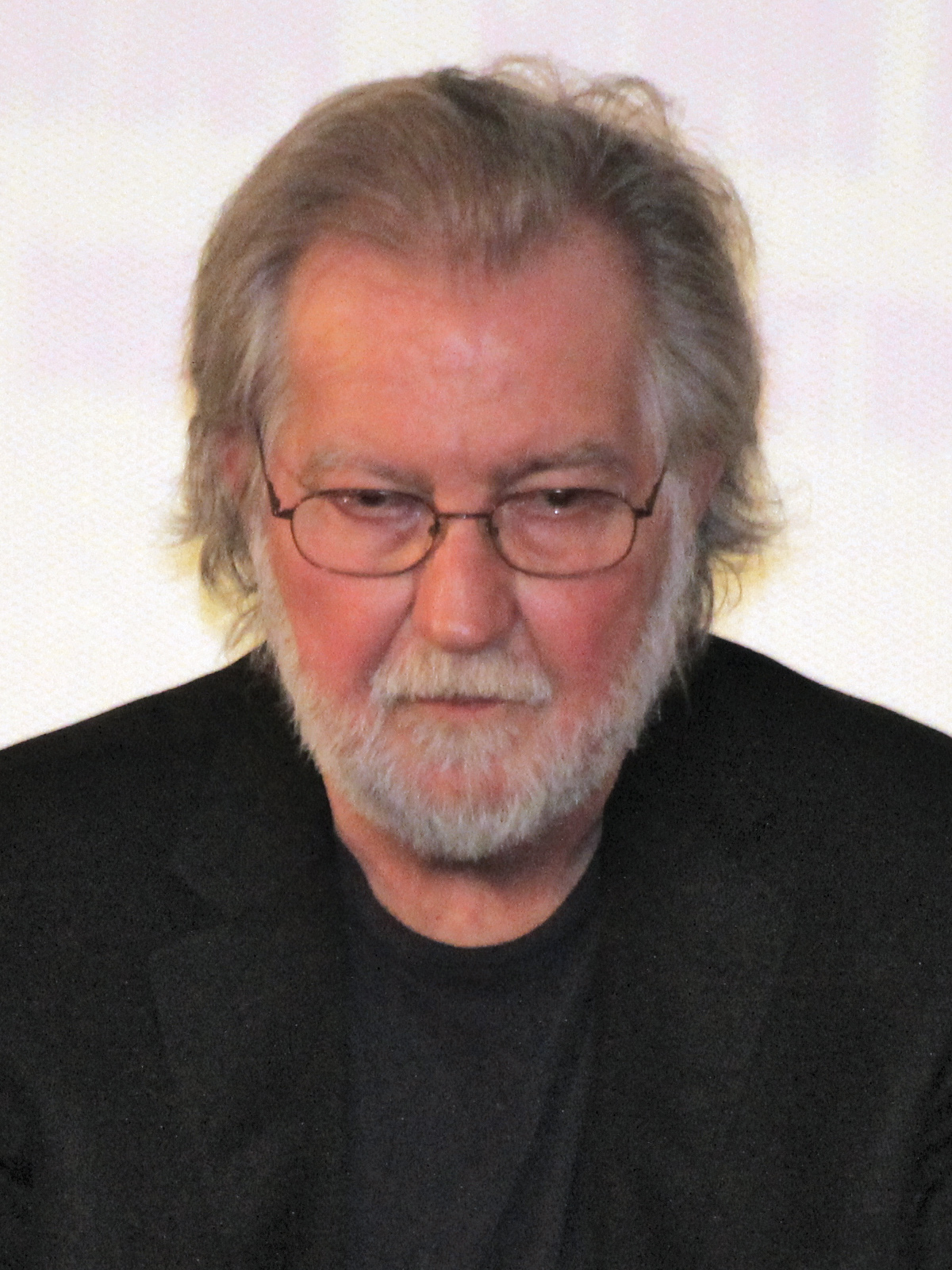
- Hooper in 2014
- Born: Willard Tobe Hooper; January 25, 1943; Austin, Texas, U.S.
- Died: August 26, 2017 (aged 74); Los Angeles, California, U.S.
- Occupations: Director; screenwriter; producer; composer
- Years active: 1964–2017
- Spouse(s): Maev Margaret Noonan (m. 1961; div. 1969) Carin Berger (m. 1983; div. 1990) Rita Marie Bartlett (m. 2008; div. 2010)
- Children: 1
- Relatives: William Berger (father-in-law)
- Awards: See below

Willard Tobe Hooper (/ˈtoʊbi/; January 25, 1943 – August 26, 2017) was an American filmmaker, best known for his work in the horror genre. The British Film Institute cited Hooper as one of the most influential horror filmmakers of all time.

Born in Austin, Texas, Hooper's feature film debut was the independent Eggshells (1969), which he co-wrote with Kim Henkel. The two reunited to co-write The Texas Chain Saw Massacre (1974), which Hooper also directed. The film went on to become a classic of the genre, and was described in 2010 by The Guardian as "one of the most influential films ever made." Hooper subsequently directed the horror film Eaten Alive (1976), followed by the 1979 miniseries Salem's Lot, an adaptation of the novel by Stephen King. Following this, Hooper signed on to direct The Funhouse (1981), a major studio slasher film distributed by Universal Pictures. The following year, he directed the supernatural horror Poltergeist, produced by Steven Spielberg.

In the mid-1980s, Hooper directed two science fiction horror films: Lifeforce (1985) and Invaders from Mars (1986), followed by The Texas Chainsaw Massacre 2 (1986), a big-budget sequel to his original film. The 1990s saw Hooper directing various horror and sci-fi projects, including Spontaneous Combustion (1990), which he also co-wrote; the television anthology film Body Bags (1993); and The Mangler (1995), another adaptation of a Stephen King story.

Hooper directed several projects throughout the 2000s, including the monster film Crocodile (2000), an episode of the sci-fi miniseries Taken (2002), and two episodes of Masters of Horror (2005–2006).

== Early years ==
Hooper was born January 25, 1943, in Austin, Texas, to Lois Belle (née Crosby) and Norman William Ray Hooper, who owned a theater in San Angelo. The film The Texas Chain Saw Massacre explores hicksploitation themes related to his childhood. He first became interested in filmmaking when he used his father's 8 mm camera at the age of nine.

He went to college at the University of Texas at Austin. He was present on campus during the mass shooting incident of August 1, 1966, when Charles Whitman opened fire on random people from the university's clock tower, fatally shooting a police officer who was close by Hooper.

== Career ==
Hooper spent the 1960s as a college professor and documentary cameraman. His 1965 short film The Heisters was invited to be entered in the short subject category for an Academy Award, but was not finished in time for the competition that year. His first feature film, Eggshells (1969), was made for $40,000.

Soon after, Hooper leapt to fame with The Texas Chain Saw Massacre (1974). He combined elements from a story he wrote about isolation and darkness with the inspiration of graphic news coverage of violence, with his belief that people were the true monsters being a key element for the film. Along with Kim Henkel, they co-wrote a screenplay that had elements based on the murders of Ed Gein and Elmer Wayne Henley while forming a company named Vortex, Inc. They produced the film alongside Jay Parsley and Richard Saenz. The low budget (roughly less than $140,000) meant that the film was shot seven days a week, having shooting times up to 16 hours a day, dealing with brutally hot temperatures, high humidity and limited special effects. Hooper had to deal with the Motion Picture Association of America (MPAA) with the rating; he had hoped the limited amount of gore seen in the film would give it a PG, but the original print was given an X rating. After some cuts, it was given an R rating. The film was cited as one of the scariest films of all time, with film critic Roger Ebert, despite awarding it only two out of four stars, describing it as a "weird, off-the-wall achievement." It was also a huge commercial success, making $30 million in the United States and Canada, while being one of the highest grossing independent films of the 1970s.

Hooper's next film was Eaten Alive (1976), co-written by Henkel and producers Alvin L. Fast and Mardi Rustam. As with Massacre, the film was inspired by serial killings, this time the murderer Joe Ball, who killed at least two people in the 1930s and whose crimes led to his nicknames of 'The Alligator Man' and 'The Butcher of Elmendorf'. The movie was filmed on sound-stages in California. Hooper provided the music alongside Wayne Bell - but walked off the production before shooting completed.

Hooper had his biggest budget yet with the television mini-series of Salem's Lot (1979), filmed on a budget of $4 million for CBS while being released theatrically in some countries. It was a screening of Massacre that led producer Richard Kobritz to hire Hooper as director. He shot the film from July to August 1979, although the film differed from the source material (particularly with the violence and graphic scenes) in order to meet broadcast standards. He described it as 'very spooky - it suggests things and always has the overtone of the grave. It affects you differently than my other horror films. It's more soft-shelled...it has atmosphere which creates something you cannot escape - the reminder that our time is limited and all the accoutrements that go with it, such as the visuals.' Hooper then went on to make The Funhouse (1981) about teenagers who are stalked by a killer in a carnival fun-house.

In 1982, Hooper made Poltergeist, based on a story by Steven Spielberg. Hooper was selected by Spielberg to direct based on his prior work, Spielberg having co-written the screenplay and co-produced the film. It was Hooper who collaborated with Spielberg to make it more of a ghost story than the original science-fiction-based treatment had been, as it had originally been conceived as a sequel to Close Encounters of the Third Kind.

Cannon Films approached Hooper with the offer of a three-picture deal. He made Lifeforce (1985), Invaders from Mars (1986) and The Texas Chainsaw Massacre 2 (1986). Hooper also began working steadily in television.

Hooper's later works included Spontaneous Combustion (1990); the television movie I'm Dangerous Tonight (1990); and Night Terrors (1993). He directed an installment of the made-for-television feature Body Bags (1993). His works also include The Mangler (1995), The Apartment Complex (1999), Crocodile (2000), Toolbox Murders (2004), and Mortuary (2005).

Hooper was asked to contribute to the series Masters of Horror; he responded by directing "Dance of the Dead" (2005) with Robert Englund in the first season, and "The Damned Thing" in the second season.

Hooper was inducted into the Texas Film Hall of Fame in 2003.

In 2010, writer and actor Mark Gatiss interviewed Hooper for the third episode of his BBC documentary series A History of Horror.

Hooper's first novel, Midnight Movie, was published on Three Rivers Press in 2011.

His supernatural thriller film Djinn premiered at the 2013 Abu Dhabi Film Festival.

== Personal life ==
Hooper was married three times. He married his first wife, Maev Margaret Noonan, in 1961. They divorced in 1969, producing one son, William Tony Hooper, who was born in 1964. In the Fall of 1979 issue of Cinefantastique magazine, Hooper declared "I'm divorced. I was married very young and been divorced about eight years." At the time of the interview, his son lived with him in Los Angeles.

Hooper married again in 1983 to Carin Berger (daughter of actor William Berger), but they divorced in 1990. He later married Rita Marie Bartlett in 2008, but they divorced in 2010.

=== Death ===
Hooper died of natural causes in the Sherman Oaks neighborhood of Los Angeles, California, on August 26, 2017, at the age of 74.

== Legacy ==
Filmmakers who have been influenced by Hooper include Hideo Nakata, Wes Craven, Rob Zombie, Alexandre Aja, Jack Thomas Smith, Kiyoshi Kurosawa, Takashi Miike and Nicolas Winding Refn. Ridley Scott said that his work on Alien was influenced more by Hooper's The Texas Chain Saw Massacre than any other genre film.

== Filmography ==
=== Film ===
Year	Title	Functioned as				Notes
Year	Title	Director	Writer	Producer	Composer	Notes
1969	Eggshells	Yes	Yes	Yes	Yes	Co-written with Kim Henkel; Also editor, cinematographer, camera operator, special effects, and photoplay designer
1974	The Texas Chain Saw Massacre	Yes	Yes	Yes	Yes	Co-written with Kim Henkel; Also Additional photography
1976	Eaten Alive	Yes	No	No	Yes	
1981	The Funhouse	Yes	No	No	No	
1982	Poltergeist	Yes	No	No	No	
1985	Lifeforce	Yes	No	No	No	
1986	Invaders from Mars	Yes	No	No	No	
1986	The Texas Chainsaw Massacre 2	Yes	No	No	Yes	
1990	Spontaneous Combustion	Yes	Yes	No	No	Co-written with Howard Goldberg
1993	Night Terrors	Yes	No	No	No	
1995	The Mangler	Yes	Yes	No	No	Co-written with Stephen David Brooks And Peter Welbeck
2000	Crocodile	Yes	No	No	No	
2003	The Texas Chainsaw Massacre	No	No	Yes	No	
2004	Toolbox Murders	Yes	No	No	No	
2005	Mortuary	Yes	No	No	No	
2006	The Texas Chainsaw Massacre: The Beginning	No	No	Yes	No	
2013	Djinn	Yes	No	No	No	
2013	Texas Chainsaw 3D	No	No	Executive	No	
2017	Leatherface	No	No	Executive	No	

==== Acting roles ====
Year	Title	Role	Notes
1971	The Windsplitter	Joby	
1986	The Texas Chainsaw Massacre 2	Man in Hotel Corridor	Uncredited
1988	Coming to America	Party Guest	Uncredited
1989	Spontaneous Combustion	Diner Patron	
1992	Sleepwalkers	Forensic Tech	

=== Television ===
Television series

Year	Title	Notes	Ref.
1987	Amazing Stories	Episode: "Miss Stardust" (series finale)	
1987	The Equalizer	Episode: "No Place Like Home"	
1988	Freddy's Nightmares	Episode: "No More Mr. Nice Guy" (series pilot)	
1991	Haunted Lives: True Ghost Stories	Episode: "Ghosts R Us/Legend of Kate Morgan/School Spirit"	
1991	Tales from the Crypt	Episode: "Dead Wait"	
1995	Nowhere Man	Episode: "Turnabout" and "Absolute Zero"'	
1997	Dark Skies	Episode: "The Awakening"	
1997	Perversions of Science	Episode: "Panic"	
2000	The Others	Episode: "Souls on Board"	
2002	Night Visions	Episode: "Cargo" and "The Maze"	
2005–06	Masters of Horror	Episodes: "Dance of the Dead", "The Damned Thing"	

TV films, miniseries, and specials

Year	Title	Notes	Ref.
1979	Salem's Lot		
1990	I'm Dangerous Tonight		
1993	Body Bags	Co-directed with John Carpenter, and Tom Arnold, also actor	
1999	The Apartment Complex		
2002	Taken	Episode: "Beyond the Sky"	

=== Music videos ===
Year	Track	Artist	Ref.
1983	"Dancing with Myself"	Billy Idol	

=== Documentary works ===
Year	Title	Ref.
1970	Peter Paul and Mary: The Song Is Love	

== Awards and nominations ==
Institution	Year	Category	Work	Result
Avoriaz Fantastic Film Festival	1976	Grand Prize	The Texas Chain Saw Massacre	Nominated
Avoriaz Fantastic Film Festival	1976	Critics Award	The Texas Chain Saw Massacre	Won
Avoriaz Fantastic Film Festival	1978	Grand Prize	Eaten Alive	Nominated
Fantasia Film Festival	2014	Lifetime Achievement Award	—N/a	Won
Fantasporto Festival	1989	Best Film	The Texas Chainsaw Massacre 2	Nominated
Fantasporto Festival	1991	Best Film	Spontaneous Combustion	Nominated
Jupiter Award	1983	Best International Film	Poltergeist	Nominated
MTV Video Music Awards	1984	Best Direction	"Dancing with Myself"	Nominated
Philadelphia Film Festival	2004	Phantasmagoria Award	—N/a	Won
Saturn Awards	1983	Best Director	Poltergeist	Nominated
Sitges Film Festival	2003	Time-Machine Honorary Award	—N/a	Won

== See also ==
- Tobe Hooper's unrealized projects

== Bibliography ==
- Hooper, Tobe; Goldsher, Alan (2011). Midnight Movie: A Novel. Three Rivers Press. ISBN 9780307717016.
