= Spiders (film) =

- Directed by: Gary Jones
- Screenplay by: Stephen David Brooks; Jace Anderson; Adam Gierasch
- Produced by: Boaz Davidson; Danny Lerner
- Starring: Lana Parrilla; Josh Green; Oliver Macready
- Cinematography: Jack Cooperman
- Edited by: Christopher Holmes
- Production company: Cobwebster Corporation Millennium Films
- Distributed by: Millennium Films
- Release date: December 27, 2000
- Running time: 95 minutes
- Country: United States
- Language: English

Spiders is a 2000 American science fiction horror film directed by Gary Jones and written by Adam Gierasch and Jace Anderson. The film stars Lana Parrilla as a newspaper journalist who is investigating a top secret government facility. The film was released by Millennium Films on December 27, 2000.

A sequel titled Spiders II: Breeding Ground and starring Richard Moll, Stephanie Niznik and Greg Cromer was released direct-to-video on September 24, 2002.

== Cast ==
- Lana Parrilla as Marci Eyre
- Josh Green as John Murphy
- Oliver Macready as Slick
- Nick Swarts as Jake
- Mark Phelan as Agent Gray
- Leslie Zemeckis as Emma
- Jonathan Breck as Jacobs
- Mark Totty as Commander Hooters
- David Carpenter as Technician
- Andrew Stoddard as Doctor Ellis
- Steven Sullivan as Max
- Billy Maddox as Colonel Dixon
- Corey Klemow as Joe Martindale
- Simona Williams as Loretta Martindale
- Nicole Tocantins as Moira
- Timothy Di Pri as Flight Controller
- Stephen David Brooks as Lead Cop

== Critical response ==
On review aggregator Rotten Tomatoes, the film holds an approval rating of 33% based on 6 reviews.
