= Peter Katz (film producer) =

American film producer

- Occupation: Film producer
- Website: www.story-driven.com

Peter Katz is an American film producer. His work includes Pop Skull, Home Sick and Mortuary.

== Career ==
Katz has produced genre films that have screened at the AFI Fest, Rome Film Festival, as well as the New Zealand International Film Festival. He was one of the producers on Mortuary, which was helmed by director Tobe Hooper. His newest feature, Pop Skull, has received positive reviews from such press as Variety, San Francisco Bay Guardian, and Fangoria. Pop Skull was the subject an experiment in neurocinema that mapped audiences reactions to individual scenes in the film. Katz said that the information would be used to make more effective films that were properly marketed to audience desires.

In addition to making feature films, Peter has organized multimedia panels at Comic Con and he is the host of the Hollywood 2.0 podcast where he interviews innovators in the entertainment industry. They discuss where storytelling, business, and tech intersect.

Katz is the founder of the management and production company, Story Driven.

== Awards ==
Pop Skull

- 2008 Best Feature Film, Indianapolis International Film Festival
- 2008 Jury Award, Boston Underground Film Festival

== Filmography (as producer) ==
- Mortuary (2005)
- Home Sick (2007)
- Pop Skull (2007)
