= Djinn (2013 film) =

2013 Emirati horror film

- Theatrical release poster
- Directed by: Tobe Hooper
- Written by: David Tully
- Produced by: Daniela Tully; Tim Smythe
- Starring: Khalid Laith; Razane Jammal
- Cinematography: Joel Ransom
- Edited by: Andrew Cohen; Mark Stevens
- Music by: BC Smith
- Production companies: Image Nation; FilmWorks
- Release date: 25 October 2013 (Abu Dhabi Film Festival)
- Running time: 85 minutes
- Country: United Arab Emirates
- Languages: Arabic; English
- Budget: US$5 million

Djinn is a 2013 Emirati supernatural horror film directed by Tobe Hooper and written by David Tully. It is set in the United Arab Emirates and features the djinn. The film, produced by Image Nation, is in both Arabic and English languages. The film's theatrical release has been delayed since 2011. Djinn premiered at the Abu Dhabi Film Festival on 25 October 2013.

The film was Hooper's final directorial effort before his death in 2017.

== Plot ==
In the near future, a young Emirati couple returns to their home country and moves into a high-rise apartment in Ras al-Khaimah. They discover that their neighbors may not be human. The film also flashes back to an abandoned fishing village, where the apartment was eventually built. In the area of the village, an American backpacker learns about djinn from local Emiratis.

== Cast ==
- Khalid Laith
- Razane Jammal
- May Calamawy as Ayisha
- Aiysha Hart
- Carole Abboud
- Paul Luebke as Bobby (backpacker)
- Ahmed Abdullah
- Abdullah Al Junaibi
- Saoud Al Kaabi

== Production ==
Djinn is directed by Tobe Hooper based on a screenplay by David Tully. The project was set up by Imagenation Abu Dhabi (now Image Nation) in February 2011. Emirati director Nayla Al Khaja joined the project as a cultural consultant. The film is the first supernatural thriller film in both English and Arabic languages. Tully said films about the djinn were very uncommon, only recalling Wishmaster (1997). He said Djinn had minimal gore, similar to Hooper's previous films The Texas Chain Saw Massacre (1974) and Poltergeist (1982). Tully came up with the premise for Djinn when an Emirati friend brought him to a village similar to the one in the film. The screenwriter learned about local stories told in the region.

With a production budget of US$5 million, filming began in the United Arab Emirates in late March 2011 and took place at several locations throughout Dubai. The subject matter was treated with caution so it would not offend local values in the different towns where filming took place. In Al Jazira Al Hamra, the cast and crew avoided using the word "djinn" and also taped over the film's title on the director's chair. By late August 2011, the film was in post-production.

== Release ==
In February 2011 Fortissimo Films acquired the right to represent international sales for Image Nation's films, including Djinn. The film had a test screening in December 2011 in London, which 300 moviegoers attended. It was offered "a red-carpet premiere" at the 2011 Dubai International Film Festival but was not screened at the festival. The studio promised a theatrical release in early 2012 then in mid-2012; neither release transpired. The National reported in January 2012 that a website said that Image Nation turned down two distribution offers, but Image Nation denied this and said the film took longer than expected in post-production. In December 2012, The Guardian covered the film's delay and cited multiple reasons. The paper reported that unofficial reasons included people related to Abu Dhabi's royal family finding the film "to be politically subversive", horror films being "seen as totally foreign, culturally speaking" in the United Arab Emirates, and local pride that led to "rewrites and restructuring". Image Nation's CEO Michael Garin denied these reasons and blamed the delay on meeting the Directors Guild of America's requirements.

Sales for Djinn were launched at the 63rd Berlin International Film Festival in February 2013 and continued at the 2013 Cannes Film Festival the following May. The film premiered at the Abu Dhabi Film Festival on October 25, 2013.

== Critical reception ==
Jay Weissberg at Variety said Djinn looked "outright bad" for a film by Hooper. The critic wrote, "This limp attempt at local horror takes elements from Rosemary's Baby, The Grudge, and others, thrown together into a cheesy, ham-fisted ghost story... Hooper's lack of engagement isn't helped by unimaginative f/x and leaden dialogue." Weissberg did not find the film scary due to its recycling of the elements and thought that characterization was nonexistent. He also said that Djinn was not redeemed by either its cinematography or editing.

Ronan Doyle at Indiewire also panned the film, "From its very first frame, expounding exposition over a shoddily-shot desert sequence, this is an unmitigated disaster of a movie, every bit as horrible as the events it attempts to portray." Doyle wrote the film was a disappointment "tonally as well as technically". He found Tully's script to be "insistently uninventive" in reusing common horror elements. Doyle concluded, "Djinn represents, in the end, a fundamental failure to capitalize on the chance for a particularly culturally-rooted new breed of horror film."

Marwa Hamad, reviewing for Gulf News, wrote that the film's use of djinns was a welcome change from traditional horror narratives. Hamad wrote, "The gimmicky nature of the film is undeniable, relying on the jump-in-your-seat sort of shockers rather than really messing with its viewers’ psyches ... But that doesn't mean that Djinn failed to break ground." Hamad commended the portrayal of the Westernized Arab couple, "The characters' crisis of nationality and lack of belonging underlies the entirety of the plot." She noted, "In that sense, the movie was able to resonate with—and subsequently instill terror into—a certain segment of viewers who usually benefit from feeling a sense of detachment from horror film victims who look and talk nothing like them."

The website Culture Crypt said: " 'Djinn' is an 'almost there' movie. It possesses building blocks for original terror, though not the courage to double down on its DNA, opting instead to hedge bets with watered-down drama and routine frights. Acting is on point when scenes are spoken in Arabic, but deadened dialogue delivery in English chills chemistry between characters. Like its namesake, 'Djinn' wanders between two worlds, committed to neither and unable to form any fuller than a shadow of what it once was, or what it could have been."
