= Crocodile 2: Death Swamp =

- DVD cover
- Directed by: Gary Jones
- Written by: Jace Anderson; Adam Gierasch
- Story by: Boaz Davidson
- Produced by: Boaz Davidson; Frank DeMartini; Danny Dimbort; Avi Lerner; Trevor Short
- Starring: Heidi Lenhart; Chuck Walczak; Jon Sklaroff; David Valcin; Martin Kove; Darryl Theirse
- Cinematography: Rasool Ellore; K. Prasad
- Edited by: Alison Learned Wolf
- Music by: Bill Wandel
- Production company: Lionsgate Home Entertainment
- Distributed by: Nu Image Films
- Release date: August 1, 2002
- Running time: 89 minutes
- Country: United States
- Language: English
- Budget: $2,200,000

Crocodile 2: Death Swamp, titled Crocodile 2: Death Roll when broadcast on TV, is a 2002 American action horror film directed by Gary Jones and released directly to DVD on August 1, 2002. The film is a loose sequel to the 2000 film Crocodile. Featuring the two surviving crocodiles from the first film. The plotline is about a group of bank robbers who hijack a commercial plane, only to crash into a remote Mexican swamp terrorized by a man-eating crocodile.

== Plot ==
After a bank robbery, four criminals try to escape to the village of Santo Cristo in Acapulco, but they hijack the plane when a storm requires the pilot to start to turn around. They force the pilot to continue flying. After the copilot struggles with one of the hijackers, the plane's instrument panel is destroyed and it crashes. Most of the passengers and one of the hijackers die in the crash. The criminals gather the remaining passengers, killing those too injured to be of use, and force the rest to haul their loot through the swamp to the town they need to reach to finish their escape. While they gather the loot, a crocodile suddenly emerges from the water and eats the pilot. The criminals empty three guns into it, killing it.

As they travel through the swamp, they start falling prey to the dead crocodile's furious 40-foot mother (Flat Dog, the crocodile from the first film). As the passengers struggle to survive against Flat Dog, the only hope for rescue is in the hands of Zach, the boyfriend of one of the stewardesses and a tracker he runs into a bar that he hires to search for the crashed plane. Max (leader of the terrorists) forces the tracker to leave Mia (the stewardess) and Zach behind. But during the flight, Roland (the tracker) grabs Max's gun and shoots Max in the chest, killing him. When Roland tries to turn back, his chopper is grabbed by Flat Dog. She leaves Roland to die in an explosion. Mia and Zach become the only survivors and kill Flat Dog by using a life boat's gasoline and lighting it with her lighter, resulting in Flat Dog blowing up.

At the end of the film, Mia and Zach are at a resort swimming. As Mia jumps in the water Flat Dog appears, she then wakes up with Zach, realizing that it was just a dream. A loud roar is heard as the camera zooms out the swamp, indicating either Flat Dog survived or there is another crocodile in the swamp.

== Cast ==
- Heidi Lenhart as Mia Bozeman
- Chuck Walczak as Zach Thowler
- Jon Sklaroff as Sol
- Darryl Theirse as Max
- David Valcin as Justin Reynolds
- James Parks as Squid
- Martin Kove as Roland
- Steve Moreno as Brian Bigham
- Billy Rieck as Pete
- Anna Cranage as Julie Landon
- Dan Martin as Pilot
- Sean Euro as Sean

== Production ==
It was filmed in Ramoji Film City in Hyderabad, India.

== See also ==
- List of killer crocodile films
