= Autopsy (2008 film) =

- DVD cover
- Directed by: Adam Gierasch
- Written by: Adam Gierasch, Jace Anderson, E. L. Katz
- Produced by: Seven Arts Pictures; Warren Zide; Michael Arata
- Starring: Michael Bowen; Jessica Lowndes; Ashley Schneider; Robert Patrick; Jenette Goldstein; Ross McCall
- Cinematography: Anthony B. Richmond
- Edited by: Andrew Cohen
- Music by: Joseph Bishara
- Distributed by: High Fliers Films
- Release dates: August 24, 2008 (London FrightFest Film Festival); March 31, 2009 (United States)
- Running time: 80 minutes
- Country: United States
- Language: English
- Budget: $2 million
- Box office: $115,800

Autopsy is a 2008 American horror film directed by Adam Gierasch. It premiered on August 24, 2008, in the United Kingdom at the London FrightFest Film Festival and was selected as one of After Dark Horrorfest's "Eight Films to Die For". The films stars Michael Bowen, Jessica Lowndes, Ashley Schneider, Robert Patrick and Jenette Goldstein. Filming took place in Louisiana. The film received a mostly positive critical reception.

== Premise ==
Five friends go to New Orleans Mardi Gras. On their way home, they get into a car accident and realize they have hit a man. Before anyone can call for help, an ambulance arrives. They are taken to a strange hospital where their injuries can be examined. Upon arrival, the five friends begin disappearing one by one.

== Cast ==
- Jessica Lowndes as Emily
- Ross Kohn as Bobby
- Ross McCall as Jude
- Ashley Schneider as Clare
- Arcadiy Golubovich as Dimitrly
- Robert LaSardo as Scott
- Michael Bowen as Travis
- Jenette Goldstein as Nurse Marian
- Robert Patrick as Dr. Benway
- Elijah Hardy as Gregory
- Tatyana Kanavka as Gretchen
- Eric Adams as Officer Jacobs
- Janine Venable as Lisette

== Production ==
The production companies are Lion Share Productions, FlipZide Pictures, Parallel Zide, Seven Arts Pictures, Voodoo Production Services, Project 8 films, A-Mark Entertainment, and Autopsythemovie.

The writers include Jace Anderson, Adam Gierasch and E.L. Katz. The director of photography was Anthony B. Richmond. The editor was Andrew Cohen. The sound effects editor was Paul Timothy Carden. The music throughout the film was created by Joseph Bishara.

The distributors are Lionsgate Home Entertainment, Seven Arts Pictures, After Dark Films, Mirovision, Shaw Organisation, Excesso Entertainment, I-On New Media, Icon Film Distribution, Parallel Media and Syfy.

The filming took place in Jackson, Louisiana, New Orleans, Louisiana and Hollywood, California.

== Reception ==
Critical reception for Autopsy has been mostly positive. Fearnet commented that the film took a while to get started, but that "once Autopsy gets moving with its strange sense of humor and its admirable devotion to old-fashioned, over-the-top, Fango-friendly gore-gasms ... I have no problem calling it a weekend rental for the horror fans who've seen it all." Dread Central and HorrorNews.net both gave mostly positive reviews, and Dread Central stated that although the film "does have its fair share of pitfalls" it was overall "a living, breathing nightmare of a movie that's as sadistic as it is surreal." In contrast, DVD Talk gave a more mixed review, writing that "Director Adam Gierasch shows some talent with a few sick set pieces and bursts of aggression, but some comatose performances, predictable jumps and a slightly aimless final third keep this in stable condition." Feast On This states that they are "still unsure" about the movie and if it was good. They do cannot decide if it was "good? Bad? Cheesy? Impressive?". Feast On This then talks about the plot of the movie and states, "this movie obviously borrowed from a lot of other horror film plots to fill in some subplots". They go into the production side of things and do not agree with the budget, " If made with a bigger (or well-maintined) budget, this movie would have been exceptional". Although Feast On This is unsure of the movie, they "admit, there were actually quite a few parts that made me jump and feel scared, mostly because I was not expecting them". Feast On This does not agree with the budget of this movie because it was the "production quality that very nearly made me turn off the movie: the sound". Different from Feast On This, Gorepress.com enjoys the movie a lot. In fact, they give the movie an 8 out of 10 and they say it "presents interesting directional choices and flat out sickness scene after scene in such a rapid-fire fashion it is impossible to get bored". Although the "acting is hit and miss as is often the case with these genre flicks", this doesn't take away their comparison, "Like it was lifted straight out of 42nd street in its prime". Moriareviews.com agrees that the budget was too low, "How do four people manage to run a multi-storey hospital with so many patients? Did those posing as the staff just come across the hospital abandoned and fully equipped (most hospitals sell/auction off their used equipment, let alone the absurdity of leaving behind a fully stocked pharmacy)?".
