= Spontaneous Combustion (film) =

1990 film by Tobe Hooper

- Theatrical release poster
- Directed by: Tobe Hooper
- Screenplay by: Tobe Hooper; Howard Goldberg
- Story by: Tobe Hooper
- Produced by: Jim Rogers
- Starring: Brad Dourif; Cynthia Bain; Jon Cypher; William Prince; Melinda Dillon
- Cinematography: Levie Isaacks
- Edited by: David Kern
- Music by: Graeme Revell
- Production companies: Black Owl Productions; Project Samson; VOSC
- Distributed by: Taurus Entertainment
- Release date: February 23, 1990 (U.S.)
- Running time: 97 min.
- Country: United States
- Language: English

Spontaneous Combustion is a 1990 American science fiction horror film directed by Tobe Hooper. It was written by Tobe Hooper and Howard Goldberg, based on a story by Hooper, and is a co-production between Henry Bushkin, Sanford Hampton, Jerrold W. Lambert, Jim Rogers and Arthur M. Sarkissian.

It was nominated for best film in the 1991 Fantasporto International Fantasy Film Awards.

== Plot ==
In 1955, deep inside a hidden bunker in the Nevada desert, Brian and Peggy Bell volunteer for a secret experiment known as Operation Samson. They are exposed to the full shock of a nuclear detonation in an attempt to test new methods of radiation immunity. Against all logic and several annoyed physicists, the couple survives and is briefly hailed as proof that science can do anything if you ignore ethics long enough. That celebration ends the moment the military learns Peggy is pregnant. Terminating the pregnancy is debated and promptly avoided, so the child is born under heavy scrutiny. The infant, David Bell, arrives healthy except for a persistent fever. Within hours, his parents die in agony, consumed by a mysterious phenomenon dubbed Fire Syndrome, a grisly case of spontaneous human combustion that raises more questions than it answers.

David grows up under the name Sam Kramer, now a thirty four-year-old instructor living in California. He occasionally bursts into flames whenever emotions run high. Sam begins to manifest pyrokinesis along with the unnerving ability to influence electricity. His efforts to stay grounded lead him to Lisa Wilcox, a woman whose parents fell victim to similar fiery misfortunes. Together they search for answers, although every clue seems to point toward a conspiracy that refuses to stay buried.

Sam discovers the ugly truth during a visit to his doctor Cagney, who reveals that Sam has been a lifelong test subject for the same organization that created him. The revelation comes packaged with an attempted murder, which Sam survives by unleashing the very power they conditioned into him. Rage and fear fuel his abilities but the more he fights back, the more unstable he becomes, turning him into a danger for everyone, innocent people included.

Lisa begins to show signs of the same condition, which makes her the next target on the organization’s list. In his final moments of clarity, Sam gathers the last of his strength to rescue her and sever her connection to the experiment entirely. The effort costs him everything. His body cannot contain the power any longer and he disintegrates, leaving Lisa alive, free from the cycle that destroyed him.

== Cast ==
- Brad Dourif as Sam Kramer / David Bell
- Cynthia Bain as Lisa Wilcox
- Jon Cypher as Dr. Marsh
- William Prince as Lew Orlander
- Melinda Dillon as Nina
- Dey Young as Rachel
- Stacy Edwards as Peggy Bell
- Brian Bremer as Brian Bell
- Barbara Leary as Amy Whitaker
- Michael Keys Hall as Dr. Cagney
- Joe Mays as Dr. Persons
- John Landis as Radio Technician
- Mark Roberts as Dr. Simpson
- Dick Warlock as Mr. Fitzpatrick
- Paul Barresi as Hospital Security Guard
- Tegan West as Springer

== Production ==
Spontaneus Combustion was produced by Henry Bushkin, a former manager and partner of Johnny Carson.

== Critical reception ==
Spin magazine, while writing, "no one makes bad movies as deliriously entertaining as Tobe Hooper, whose career continues its spectacular downward slide with Spontaneous Combustion", gave the film an overall favorable review. John Kenneth Muir, in his book Horror Films of the 1980s, wrote, "Spontaneous Combustion commences on a high note of creativity and wit, but then promptly goes down in flames." Writing for DVD Talk, critic Kurt Dahlke described the film as "a weird bit of burn injury pornography (so to speak) that otherwise comes off as an oddball Cable TV drama," noting a "lack of attachment to the characters, little in the way of dynamic tension, a needless and off-putting cameo by director John Landis [...] Spontaneous Combustion is, to put it mildly, painfully stupid." Critic Loron Hays wrote in movie review site Reel Reviews that the film's story "is all Hooper. So, too, are the faults in the film," and noted that Brad Dourif's performance was "unhinged" and "watching Dourif completely spiral out of control as he flexes power over electricity is one enjoyment of the film." Writing in RogerEbert.com, Simon Abrams described Dourif's performance as "unhinged in a way that makes this otherwise stillborn 1990 post-atomic-age creature feature fitfully compelling."
