= Round Rock Cemetery =

Cemetery in Round Rock, Texas, U.S.

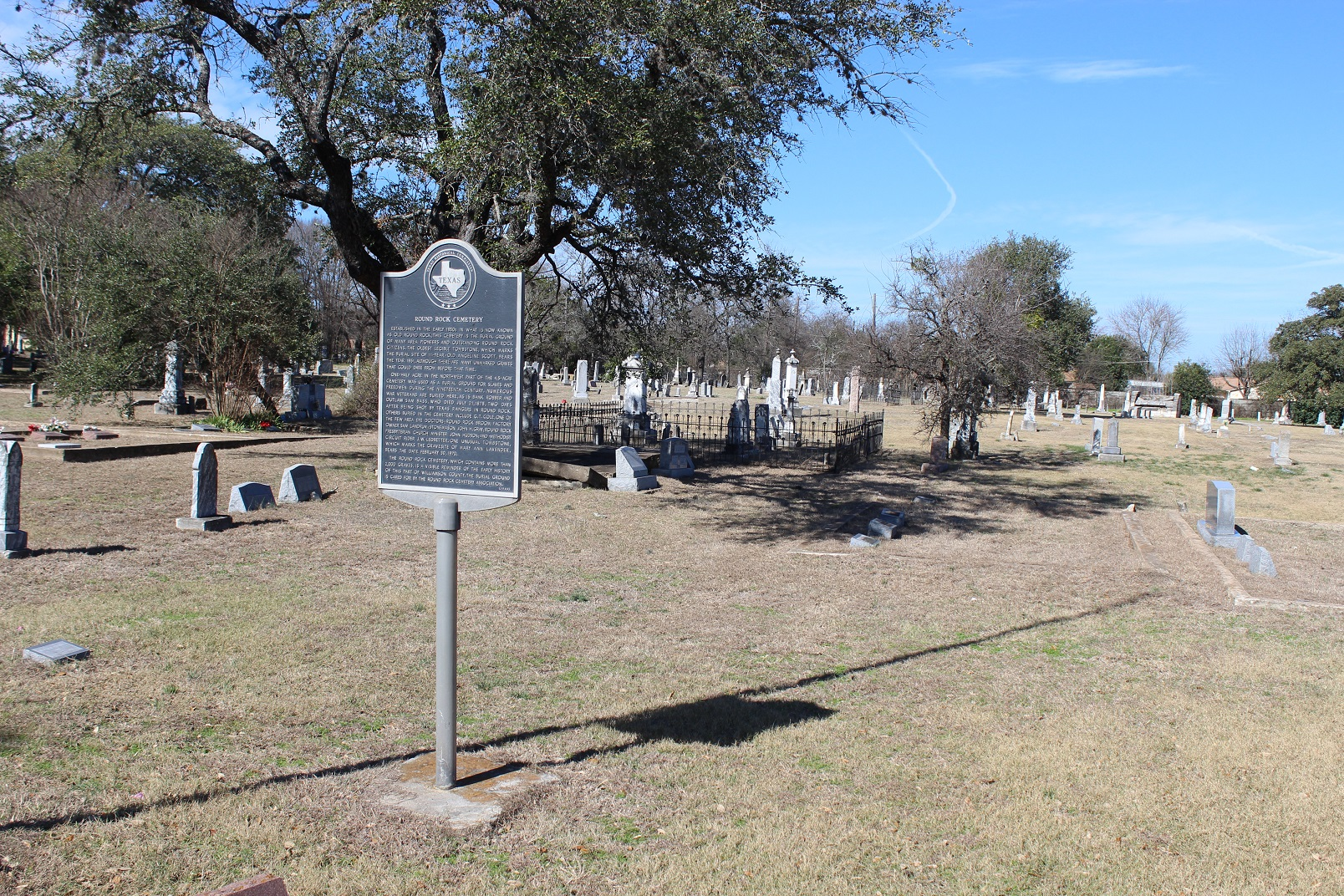
- Part of the cemetery in 2017

Details
- Location: Round Rock, Texas
- Country: United States
- Coordinates: 30°31′3″N 97°41′46″W

Round Rock Cemetery is a cemetery in Round Rock, Williamson County, Texas, United States.

== Notable burials ==
- Barbette (performer) (1899–1973), actor, trapeze artist, female impersonator
- Samuel “Sam” Bass – (1851–1878), American Old West outlaw
