= Union Pacific Big Springs robbery =

Largest single robbery in the history of the USA Union Pacific Railroad

The Union Pacific Big Springs Robbery was a robbery of a Union Pacific train near present-day Big Springs, Nebraska on September 18, 1877. The robbery was perpetrated by a gang of six outlaws led by Sam Bass. Though there were no fatalities, the bandits reportedly stole $60,000 in newly minted $20 gold pieces that was being shipped from the San Francisco Mint to a bank in the eastern United States, among other valuables. Contemporary press coverage of the sensational heist made Bass and his gang of "Black Hills Bandits" instantly famous. It remains the largest single robbery in the history of the Union Pacific Railroad. Several of the gang members were killed in the days following the robbery, but Bass escaped.

== Robbery ==
Late in the evening of Tuesday, September 18, 1877, Union Pacific express train No. 4, carrying passengers and cargo from San Francisco, stopped at a remote water station in what is now the village of Big Springs, in Deuel County, Nebraska. Under cover of night, an outlaw gang known as the "Black Hills Bandits" – including leader Sam Bass, Joel Collins, Jack Davis, Tom Nixon, Bill Heffridge, and Jim Berry – boarded the train at 10:48 PM and proceeded to rob it.

The bandits found $450 in the way safe, used for storing passenger's valuables. After interrogating an attendant as to why the main safe would not open, one of the bandits pistol-whipped the man. While the accomplices did not believe the lock was on a timer, making it impossible to open the safe before the train reached its destination, Bass realized the attendant was not lying and called off his rowdy comrade.

As the gang was walking toward the door—all but empty-handed and ready to flee the scene of the crime—something caught the eye of one: three wooden boxes stacked by the main safe. Opening the boxes, the gang discovered a fortune in "$20 gold pieces headed from the San Francisco Mint to an Eastern bank". Overall, the outlaws made off with "$60,000 [equivalent to $1,814,063 in 2025] in newly minted twenty-dollar gold pieces from the express car and $1,300 plus four gold watches from the passengers", accounting for the "first and greatest robbery of a Union Pacific train" and placing Bass in the midst of a crucial turning point in his life. The bandits were said to have divided their shares of the earnings, split six ways, under an old, prominent cottonwood tree that stood alone on the prairie near the town.

The robbery resulted in no fatalities, but there was one capture — John Barnhart, station-master. Though he made it out alive, others among the gang were not so lucky. Eight days after the robbery, Collins and Heffridge were killed by Sheriff Bardsley and a group of "ten United States Soldiers". Berry, having been wounded during a conflict with law enforcement, died a short distance from his home in Mexico, Missouri; $2,840 in cash was recovered from his person. Nixon presumably escaped home to Canada, while Bass and Davis reportedly drove southbound with their money hidden under the seat of their escape buggy.

== Legacy ==
The Big Springs robbery earned substantial notoriety for the gang; for Bass in particular, it marks his succession to fame. Before the job, the fatherless outlaw had worked as "farmer, teamster, gambler, cowboy, saloon owner, [and later as a] miner" in order to support himself. However, his continual losses on the race track and in the saloons led Bass to criminal activity. After a brief stint of trying to operate a freight line "in the black", Bass turned to stagecoaches. Not turning a profit, Bass rounded up a gang for the train robbery.

Following his Big Springs heist, Bass spent money prolifically, gaining him the title of "Robin Hood". He paid handsomely for services rendered: "payments of twenty dollars for a dozen eggs or a pan of warm biscuits were reported from many directions". Later, owing to his success, a ballad was written about Bass, in which the following lines appear:

On their way back to Texas they robbed the U.P. train,
And then split up in couples and started out again;
Joe Collins and his partner were overtaken soon,
With all their hard-earned money they had to meet their doom.

Only after the Union Pacific job did the law — in the form of freelancers hoping to cash in on a reward — come after the gang. Even with all of that money in his possession, Bass returned to crime a mere four months later. As expressed on the City of Round Rock's website, "Many people have believed that there was no way that he could have spent the money." People began to think that in his stagecoach-robbing years and up until his robbery of the Union Pacific, Bass robbed for profit. However, after Big Springs, "since it is hard to imagine that Sam could have used up all of his gold before he started train robbing again, it lends credence to the story that Sam robbed for sport more than for profit". With the robbery of the Union Pacific, Bass transformed into a bona fide outlaw, from for-profit to for-pleasure robbery.
