= Chisholm Trail Crossing Park =

Park in Round Rock, Texas, U.S.

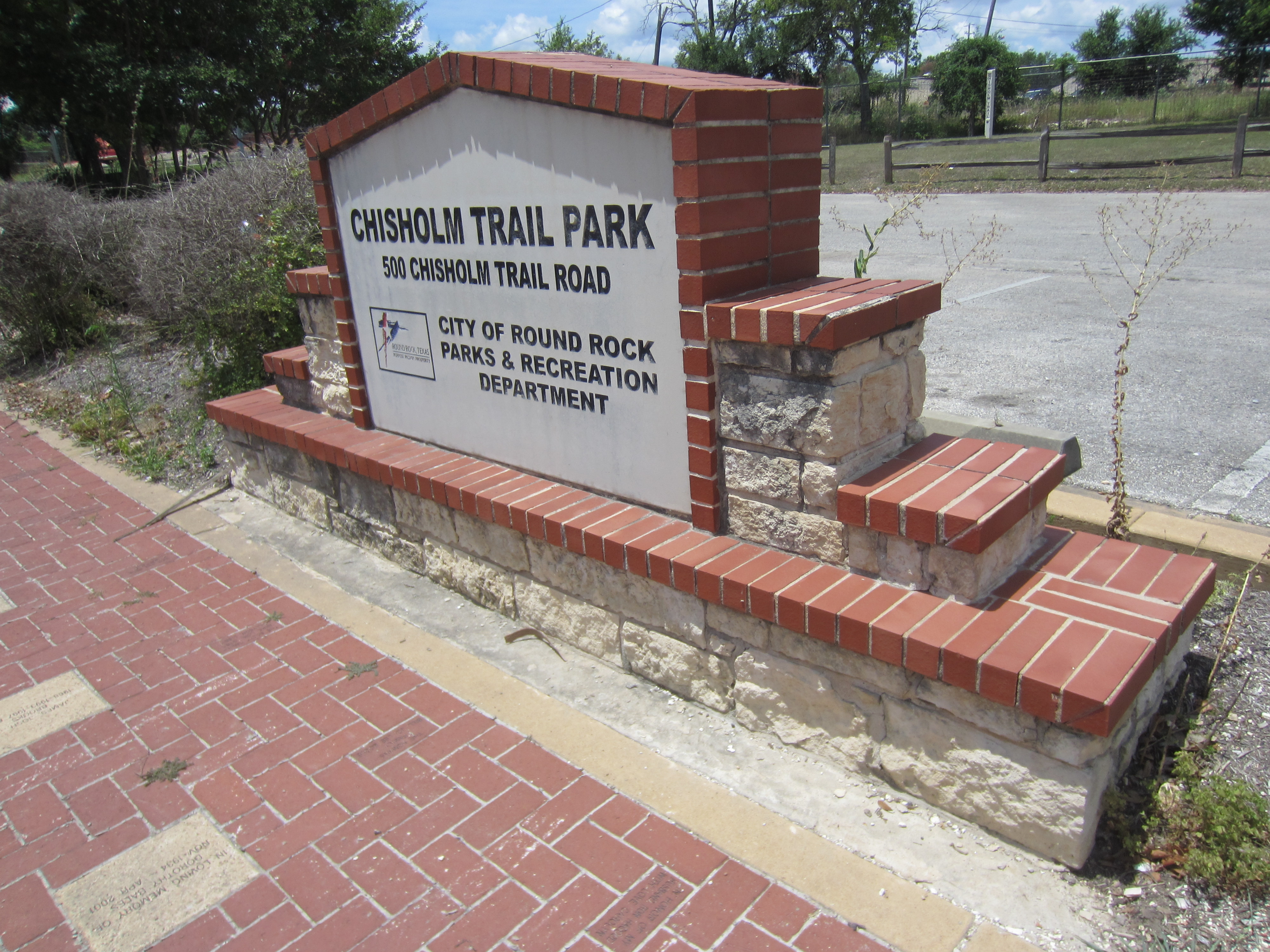
- Park sign, 2021

- Location within Texas
- Interactive map of Chisholm Trail Crossing Park
- Location: Round Rock, Texas, United States
- Coordinates: 30.5119°N 97.6894°W
- Created: 2003

Chisholm Trail Crossing Park, or simply Chisholm Trail Park, is a park in Round Rock, Texas, United States. The park was dedicated in 2003.

Texas artist Jim Thomas has been commissioned to complete a series of bronze sculptures for the park, including one depicting a resting longhorn as well as The Pioneer Woman, The Pioneer Boy, The Bell Steer, and Goin' to Water.

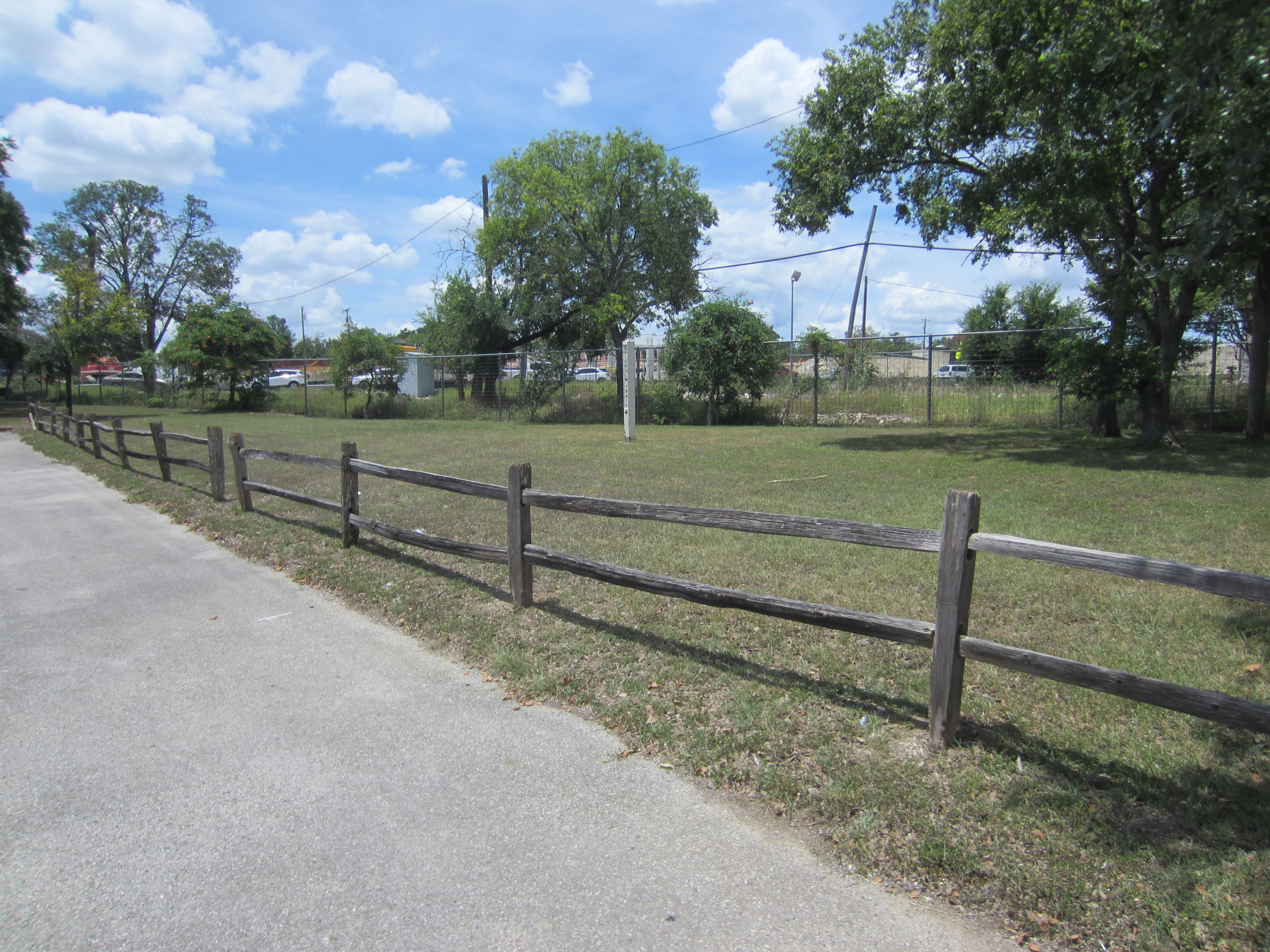
Part of the park

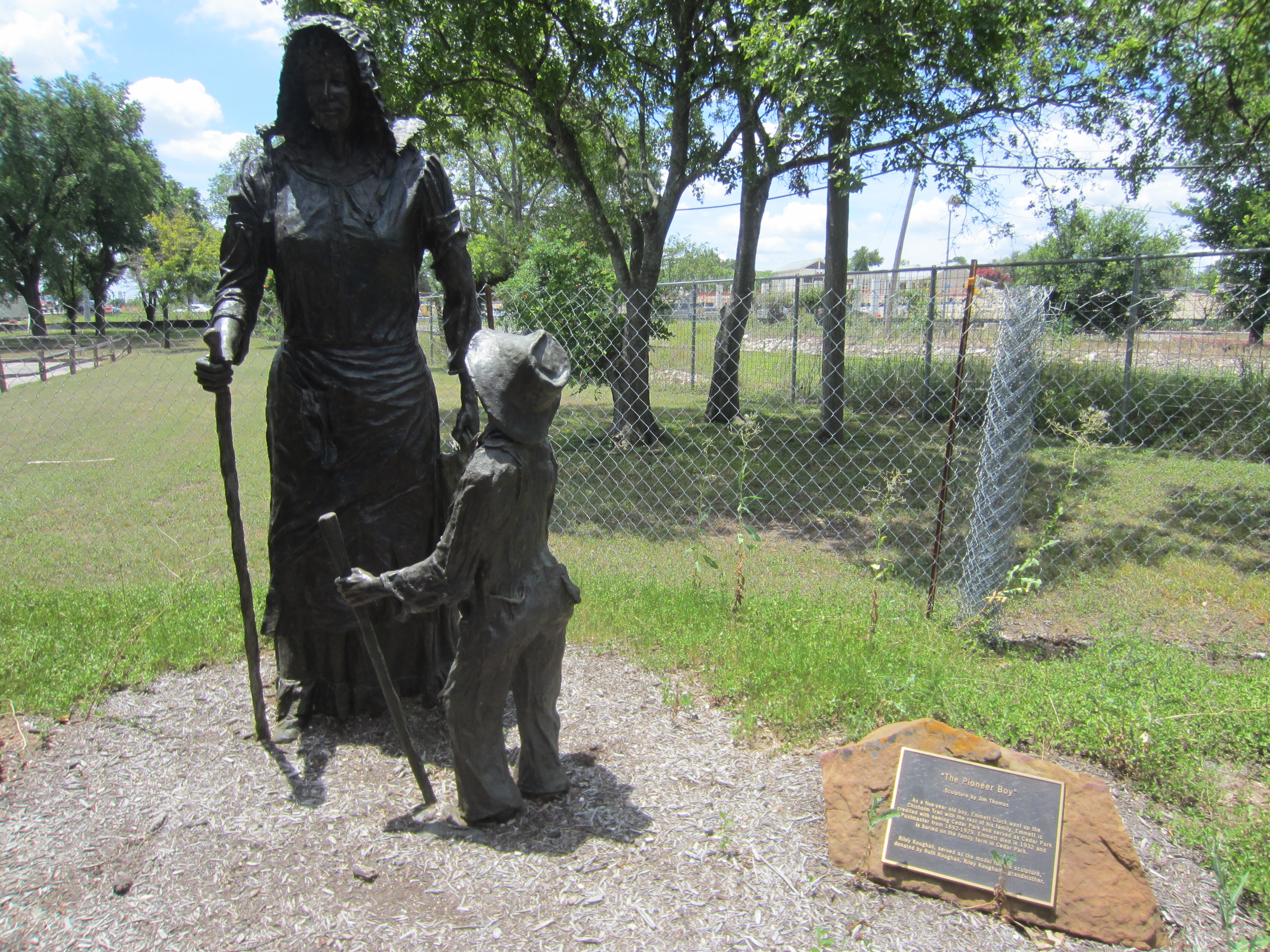
The Pioneer Boy
