= Barbette (performer) =

American entertainer (1899–1973)

- Vander Clyde transforms into Barbette, 1926. Photograph by Man Ray made on commission for Jean Cocteau
- Born: Vander Clyde Broadway; December 19, 1899; Round Rock, Texas
- Died: August 5, 1973 (aged 73); Round Rock, Texas
- Occupations: Trapeze artist, Female impersonator

Vander Clyde Broadway (December 19, 1899 – August 5, 1973), stage name Barbette, was an American female impersonator, high-wire performer, and trapeze artist born in Texas. Barbette attained great popularity throughout the United States but his greatest fame came in Europe and especially Paris, in the 1920s and 1930s.

Barbette began performing as an aerialist at around the age of 14 as one-half of a circus act called The Alfaretta Sisters. After a few years of circus work, Barbette went solo and adopted his exotic-sounding pseudonym. He performed in full drag, revealing himself as male only at the end of his act.

Following a career-ending illness or injury (the sources disagree on the cause), which left him in constant pain, Barbette returned to Texas but continued to work as a consultant for motion pictures as well as training and choreographing aerial acts for a number of circuses. After years of dealing with chronic pain, Barbette took his own life on August 5, 1973. Both in life and following his death, Barbette served as an inspiration to a number of artists, including Jean Cocteau and Man Ray.

== Early life and career ==
Barbette (birth name cited as Vander Clyde and Vander Clyde Broadway) was born on December 19, 1899, (although it is sometimes cited as 1904) in Texas. Most sources indicate he was born in Round Rock, although Barbette stated that his birthplace was Trickham. His Draft Registration Card, dated 7 September 1918, states that his birthday was 19 December 1898.

Some confusion surrounds the name of Barbette's father. On a 1923 passport application, Barbette lists his father's name as "Henry Broadway" and notes him as deceased. However, Barbette's death certificate gives his father's first name as "Jeff." The death certificate lists his mother's name as "Hattie Wilson;" Barbette listed her name as "Mrs. E. S. Loving" on his passport application, as well as his 1918 Draft Registration form.

In the United States Census of 1900, Barbette and his mother, Hattie Broadway (née Martin, 1879–1949), were living in Llano, Texas, in the household of his maternal great-grandparents, Florence E. and William Paschall, a farmer. Hattie, then aged 21, was listed as a widow on the census, while her son's birthdate is given as December 1897. Also living in the household was Hattie Broadway's younger brother, Malcolm Wilson.

Hattie Broadway married, as her second husband, in 1906, Samuel E. Loving (1868–1953), who worked in a broom factory, and had five more children, sons Eugene Loving (1908–1971) and Sam Paschall Loving (1917–1996), and daughters Hugo Loving (1910–1912), Bonsilene Loving (born 1914), and Mary Martin Loving (1915–1997); after his mother's second marriage, Barbette was known as "Vander Loving".

Barbette's mother took him to the circus at an early age in Austin and he was fascinated by the wire act. "The first time she took me to the circus in Austin, I knew I would be a performer, and from then on I'd work in the fields during the cotton-picking season to earn money in order to go to the circus as often as possible." Barbette practiced for hours by walking along his mother's steel clothes line. He graduated from high school at the age of 14.

After high school, Barbette began his circus career as one-half of the aerialist team The Alfaretta Sisters. One of the sisters had died unexpectedly and Barbette answered the surviving sister's ad for a replacement, auditioning in San Antonio. Together the pair decided that it was more dramatic for a woman to perform the acrobatic stunts. "She told me that women's clothes always make a wire act more impressive...and she asked me if I'd mind dressing as a girl. I didn't; and that's how it began." Following his time as an Alfaretta, Barbette next joined an act called Erford's Whirling Sensation. This act included three people who hung from a spinning apparatus by their teeth.

He then developed a solo act and moved to the vaudeville stage. He took on the name "Barbette", believing that it had an exotic French sound and because it could conceivably be either a first or a last name. His solo debut was at the Harlem Opera House in 1919. Barbette performed trapeze and wire stunts in full drag, maintaining the illusion of femininity until the end of his act, when he would pull off his wig and strike exaggerated masculine poses. For the next several years he toured the Keith Vaudeville Circuit, advertised as a "versatile specialty."

== The toast of Europe ==
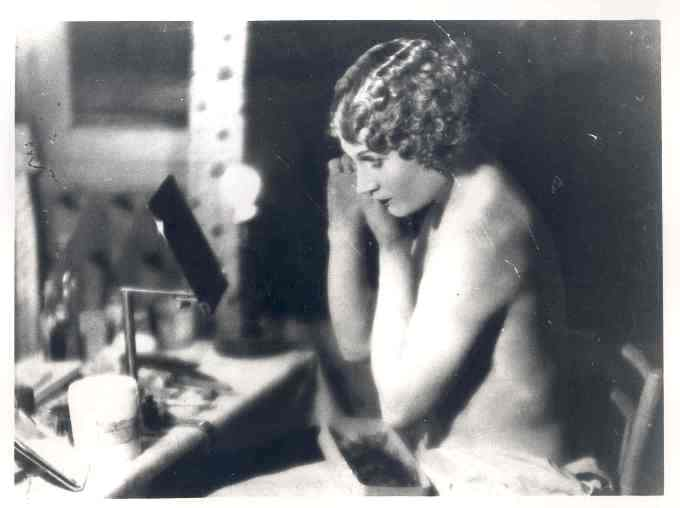
Barbette in 1923

Barbette made his European debut in 1923, having been sent by the William Morris Agency first to England and then to Paris. He appeared in such venues as the Casino de Paris, the Moulin Rouge, the Empire, the Médrano Circus, the Alhambra Theater and the Folies Bergère.

He returned to America in 1924 to appear in The Passing Show of 1924 which ran for four months beginning in September. Also in this timeframe he became a featured attraction with Ringling Bros. and Barnum & Bailey Circus and toured London, Brussels and Berlin. It was during an engagement at the London Palladium that Barbette was found engaged in sexual activity with another man. His contract was cancelled and he was never able to obtain a work permit for England again.

Barbette was championed by avant garde artist Jean Cocteau. Cocteau wrote in 1923 to Belgian friend and critic Paul Collaer:

Next week in Brussels, you'll see a music-hall act called 'Barbette' that has been keeping me enthralled for a fortnight. The young American who does this wire and trapeze act is a great actor, an angel, and he has become the friend to all of us. Go and see him ... and tell everybody that he is no mere acrobat in women's clothes, nor just a graceful daredevil, but one of the most beautiful things in the theatre. Stravinsky, Auric, poets, painters, and I myself have seen no comparable display of artistry on the stage since Nijinsky.

To other friends he wrote "Your great loss for 1923 was Barbette – a terrific act at the Casino de Paris...Ten unforgettable minutes. A theatrical masterpiece. An angel, a flower, a bird."

In 1926 Cocteau wrote an influential essay on the nature and artifice of the theatre called "Le Numéro Barbette" that was published in Nouvelle Revue Française. In this essay, Cocteau celebrates Barbette as an exemplar of theatrical artifice.

"Barbette," writes Cocteau,

transforms effortlessly back and forth between man and woman. His female glamour and elegance Cocteau likens to a cloud of dust thrown into the eyes of the audience, blinding it to the masculinity of the movements he needs to perform his acrobatics. That blindness is so complete that at the end of his act, Barbette does not simply remove his wig but instead plays the part of a man. He rolls his shoulders, stretches his hands, swells his muscles...And after the fifteenth or so curtain call, he gives a mischievous wink, shifts from foot to foot, mimes a bit of an apology, and does a shuffling little street urchin dance – all of it to erase the fabulous, dying-swan impression left by the act.

Cocteau calls upon his fellow artists to incorporate deliberately this effect that he believes for Barbette is instinctive.

Cocteau commissioned a series of photographs of Barbette by the Surrealist artist Man Ray, which captured not only aspects of Barbette's performance but also his process of transformation into his female persona. He also cast Barbette in his experimental first film Le sang d'un poète (The Blood of a Poet) (1930). Barbette appears in a scene in a theatre box with several extras, dressed in Chanel gowns, who burst into applause at the sight of a card game that ends in suicide. He replaced the Vicomtesse de Noailles, who along with her husband had originally shot the scene but were appalled upon seeing the finished film, as the card game/suicide had been shot separately.

Speaking of his preparation for the scene, Barbette, who knew he was replacing the Vicomtesse, said,

I tried to imagine myself a descendant of the Marquis de Sade, of the Comtesse de Chevigné...and a long line of rich bankers – all of which the Vicomtesse was. For a boy from Round Rock, Texas, that demanded a lot of concentration – at least as much as working on the wire.

Cocteau fell in love with the Barbette persona but their affair was short-lived. Others in Barbette's European circle included Josephine Baker, Anton Dolin, Mistinguett and Sergei Diaghilev.

Barbette is credited with having returned to the United States in 1935 to star on Broadway in the Billy Rose circus musical Jumbo. Extremely rare film footage of Barbette appearing in Jumbo at the Hippodrome in New York City, 1935, exists and was shot as part of a publicity newsreel to advertise the show. There is also footage from the premiere showing famous first-nighters arriving at the Hippodrome. Barbette is filmed performing part of his acrobatic act during Jumbo.

== End of performing career and later life ==
Barbette continued to perform until the mid-to-late 1930s. Most sources report the year as 1938, while others as early as 1936 and as late as 1942. The end of Barbette's performing career is attributed to a number of causes including a fall, pneumonia, polio, or some combination of the three. All generally agree that whatever the cause, Barbette was left in extreme pain and in need of surgery and extensive rehabilitation to allow him to walk again.

He became the artistic director and aerialist trainer for a number of circuses, including Ringling Bros. and the Shrine Circus. His work with Ringling Bros. has been described as "reinvent[ing] the aerial ballet". The Bird Cage Girls, The Swing High Girls, The Whirl Girls and the Cloud Swing Girls were among the female aerialist troupes whose routines were Barbette's specialty. He created the circus sequences for the Orson Welles-produced Broadway musical Around the World.

Barbette served as a consultant on a number of films, including the circus sequences for Till the Clouds Roll By (1946) and The Big Circus (1959), and was hired to coach Jack Lemmon and Tony Curtis on gender illusion for the film Some Like It Hot (1959) Cocteau biographer Francis Steegmuller wrote a profile of Barbette for The New Yorker in 1969 entitled "An Angel, A Flower, A Bird". Barbette has a brief cameo in the jazz club scene which opens Curtis Harrington's film Night Tide (1961). Barbette created the aerial ballet for Disney on Parade and toured with it in Australia from 1969 through 1972.

Barbette spent his last months in Texas, living in Round Rock and Austin with his sister, Mary Cahill, often in severe pain. He died by suicide aged 73, taking an overdose on August 5, 1973. He was survived by his sister Mary and a half-brother, Sam Loving. Barbette was cremated and his ashes were buried in Round Rock Cemetery.

== Cultural legacy ==
In addition to Cocteau's essay Le Numéro Barbette and his appearance in Le Sang d'un Poete, Barbette also inspired the characterization of "Death" in Cocteau's play Orphée. The book Barbette, collecting Cocteau's essay, the New Yorker profile by Steegmuller, Man Ray's photographs and other material, was published in 1989.

Barbette may have been the inspiration for the 1933 German film, Viktor und Viktoria, which features a plot about a woman pretending to be a female impersonator, whose gimmick of removing her wig at the end of her act is "inspired by [Barbette's] signature gesture." Viktor und Viktoria was remade in 1935 (First a Girl), 1957 (Viktor und Viktoria) and 1982 (Victor/Victoria, which inspired a 1995 Broadway musical of the same name).

Alfred Hitchcock based a character in the 1930 film Murder! on Barbette. Different Fleshes is a book-length poem about Barbette written by Albert Goldbarth. It won the Voertman Poetry Award from the Texas Institute of Letters. In 1993, performance artist John Kelly, under commission from the Brooklyn Academy of Music, based his piece Light Shall Lift Them on him. Barbette's story is also told in the play, Barbette, written by Bill Lengfelder and David Goodwin and first presented in Dallas, Texas, in 2003. A French restaurant in Minneapolis is named Barbette after the aerialist.

Barbette appears on the cover of the 2022 edition of Goodbye to Berlin, by Christopher Isherwood. This edition was released as part of a series called 'Art Deco' which featured "nine blazing, daring novels to celebrate the 1920s – 100 years on" released by the imprint Vintage Classics of publisher Penguin Random House. Goodbye to Berlin is a notable work, and the inspiration the 1951 Broadway play I Am a Camera, the 1966 musical Cabaret, and the 1972 film of the same name.

In June 2026, a Texas Historical Marker was installed at Round Rock Cemetery to honor Barbette's life and legacy. The plaque is one of only a handful of state markers recognizing LGBTQ+ history.
