= Ryan Goins =

American baseball player (born 1988)

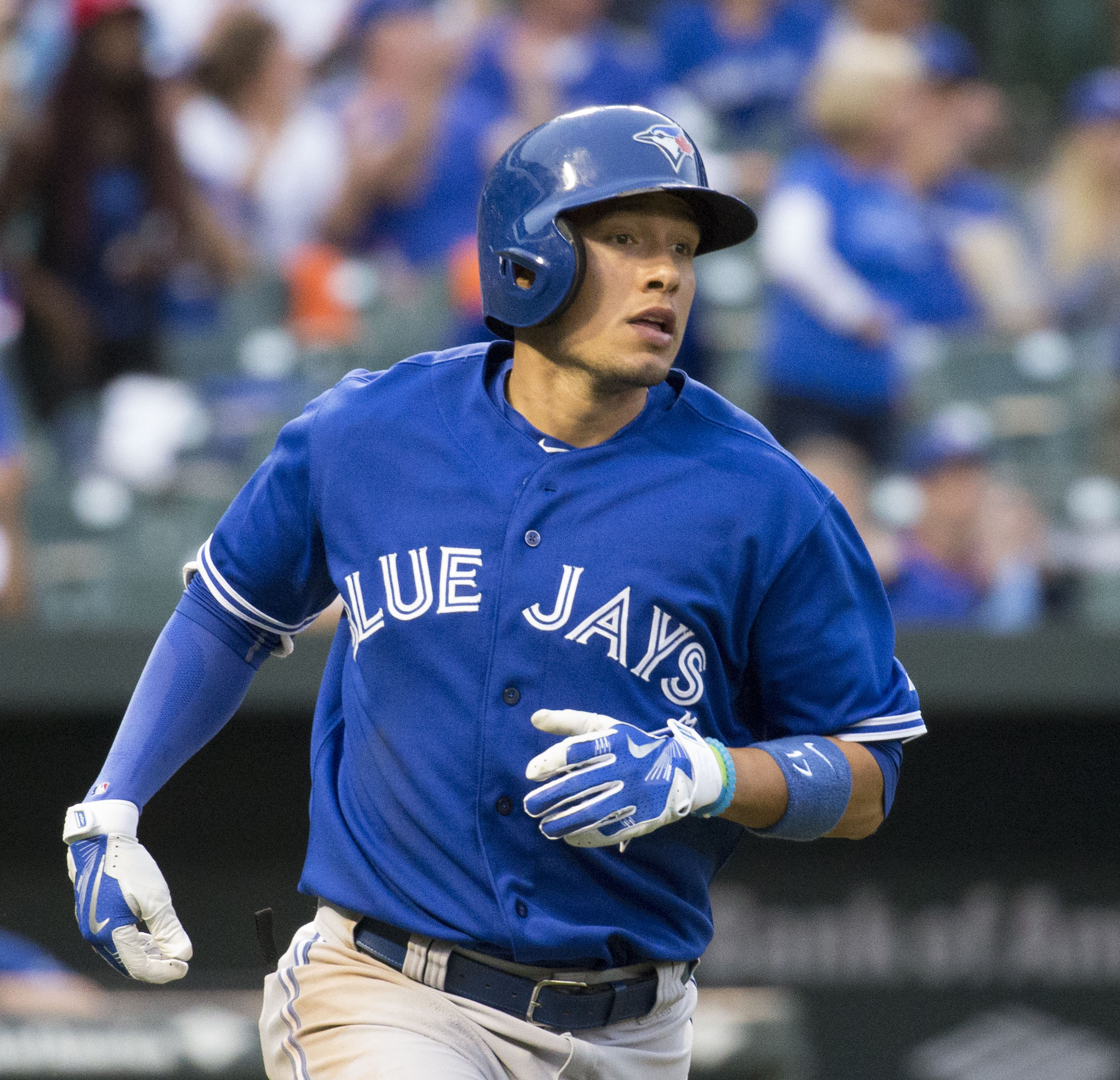
- Goins with the Toronto Blue Jays in 2015

San Diego Padres – No. 81
- Second baseman / Shortstop / Coach
- Born: February 13, 1988 (age 38); Temple, Texas, U.S.
- Batted: Left Threw: Right

MLB debut
- August 23, 2013, for the Toronto Blue Jays

Last MLB appearance
- August 29, 2020, for the Chicago White Sox

MLB statistics
- Batting average: .228
- Home runs: 22
- Runs batted in: 158
- Stats at Baseball Reference

Teams
- As player: Toronto Blue Jays (2013–2017); Kansas City Royals (2018); Chicago White Sox (2019–2020); As coach: Los Angeles Angels (2024–2025); San Diego Padres (2026–present)

Ryan Matthew Goins (born February 13, 1988) is an American former professional baseball second baseman and shortstop who currently serves as an infield instructor for the San Diego Padres of Major League Baseball (MLB). He played in MLB for the Toronto Blue Jays, Kansas City Royals, and Chicago White Sox.

== Amateur career ==
Goins attended Stony Point High School in Round Rock, Texas, where he played on his school's baseball team as a shortstop. He then enrolled at Dallas Baptist University, where he played college baseball for the Dallas Baptist Patriots from 2007 to 2009. In three seasons, Goins hit 32 home runs and recorded 117 runs batted in (RBIs). In 2009, he set the Patriots record for home runs in a single season with 22. In 2008, Goins played for the Waterloo Bucks in the Northwoods League during the offseason.

== Professional career ==
=== Minor league career ===
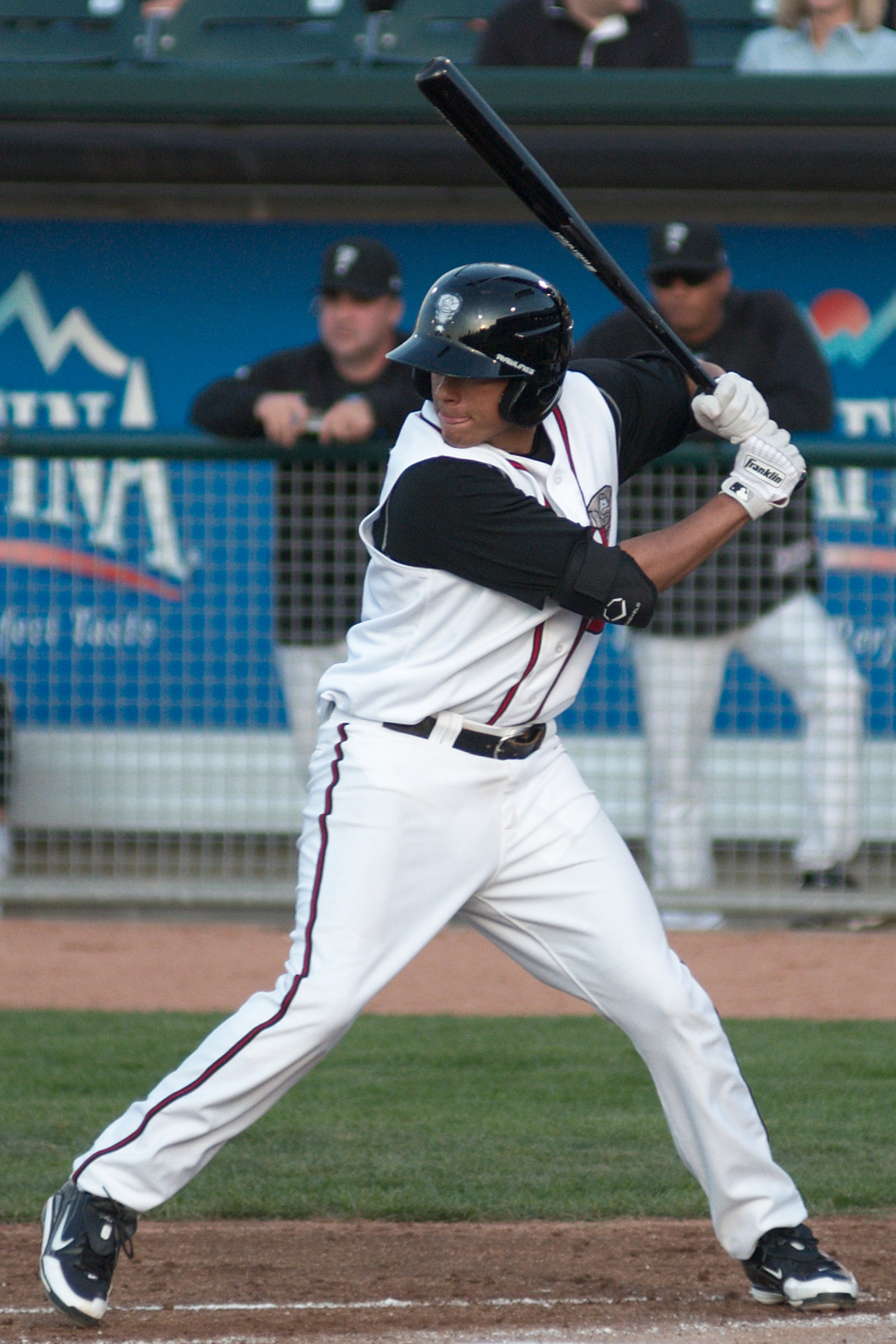
Goins with the Lansing Lugnuts in 2010

The Blue Jays drafted Goins in the fourth round of the 2009 MLB draft. He was assigned to the Rookie Gulf Coast League Blue Jays, and also played for the Short Season Auburn Doubledays and Class-A Lansing Lugnuts in 2009, collectively batting .246 with 17 RBIs. In 2010, Goins played 77 games with the Lugnuts and batted .308 before he was promoted to the Advanced-A Dunedin Blue Jays. In 124 total games in 2010, Goins batted .271 with 3 home runs and 53 RBIs. Apart from 1 rehab game in the Gulf Coast, Goins played the entire 2011 season in Dunedin, and batted .284 with 3 home runs and 52 RBIs.

Goins played for the Double-A New Hampshire Fisher Cats in 2012, batting .289 with 7 home runs and 61 RBIs in a career-high 136 games played. After the season ended Goins played 13 games with the Salt River Rafters of the Arizona Fall League, and hit .133 with 5 RBIs. The Blue Jays added him to their 40-man roster after the 2012 season. For most of the 2013 season, Goins played for the Triple-A Buffalo Bisons. He was batting .257 with 6 home runs and 46 RBIs for the Bisons before his promotion.

=== Toronto Blue Jays ===
==== 2013–2014 ====
Goins was called up by the Blue Jays on August 22, 2013, when Maicer Izturis was placed on the 15-day disabled list. He made his MLB debut on August 23, batting ninth and playing second base against the Houston Astros. Goins would later move to shortstop and finished the game 2–4 with a double. He recorded his first career RBI on August 25 when he grounded out in the ninth inning. On August 31, 2013, Goins tied a Blue Jays franchise record by hitting in his 8th consecutive game to begin his major league career, tying Jesse Barfield's streak from 1981. Goins's hit streak ended on September 1 against the Kansas City Royals, when he went 0–4 with 2 strikeouts. He hit his first big league home run on September 18, off David Huff of the New York Yankees, finishing the season with a .252 average, 2 home runs, and 8 RBIs.

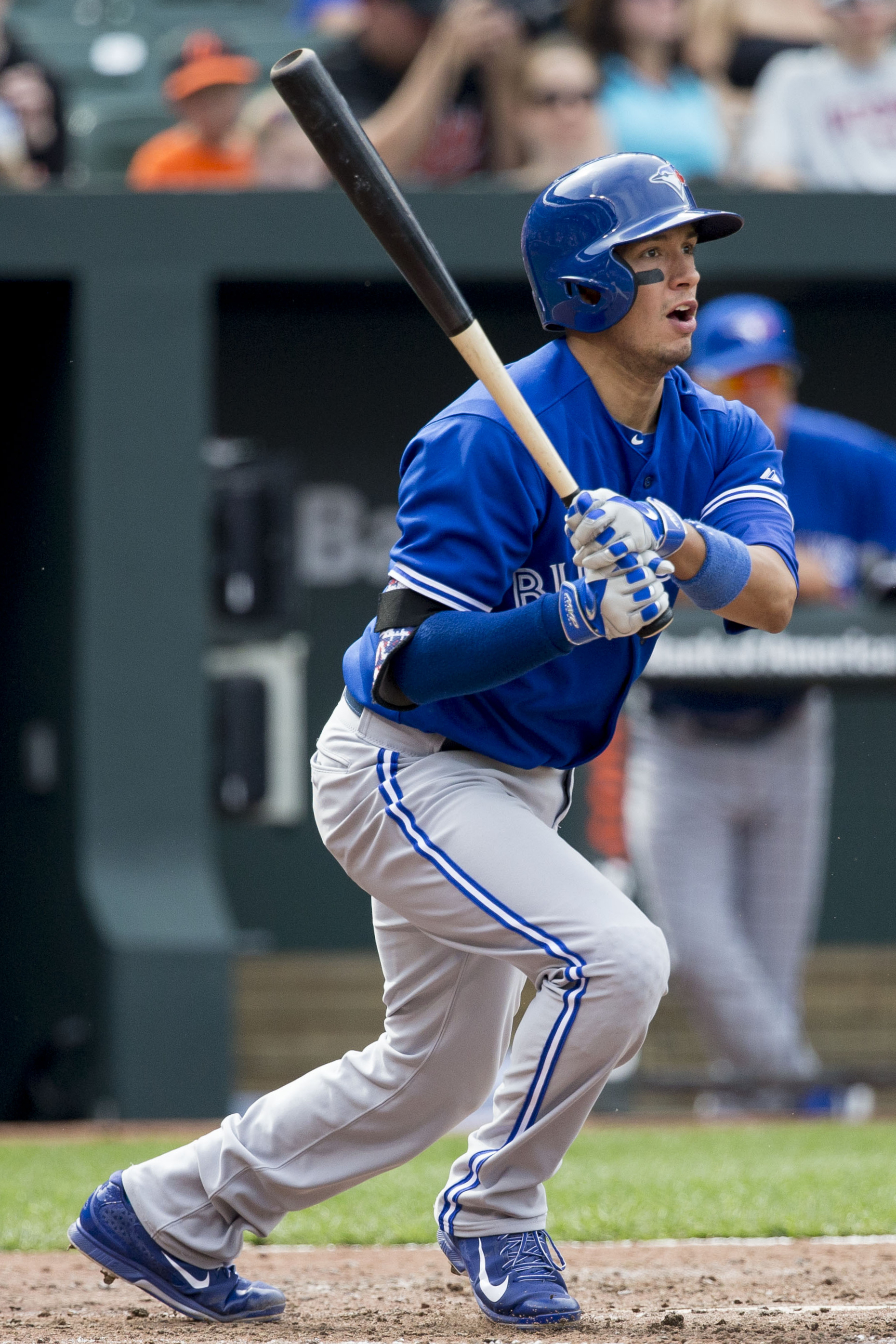
Goins batting in 2014

Goins attended 2014 spring training, seeing regular playing time at second base. He was announced as the starting second baseman for the Blue Jays on March 24, after posting a batting average of just .176. He was optioned to Triple-A Buffalo on April 28. On July 22, Goins was recalled from Buffalo. He set career-highs in both hits and RBI, with 4 each, in a 14–1 win over the Boston Red Sox on July 28. He was sent down once again, before being called up on September 1. In 67 games for the Blue Jays in 2014, Goins batted .188 with 1 home run and 15 RBI.

==== 2015–2017 ====
Goins did not make the 2015 Opening Day roster out of spring training, with Toronto opting to open the season with an eight-man bullpen. On April 16, he was recalled from Buffalo after Todd Redmond was designated for assignment. Goins became the starting shortstop on April 28, as José Reyes was placed on the disabled list with a cracked rib. After Reyes returned from the disabled list on May 25, Goins remained with the Blue Jays as a utility infielder. On July 26, he became the starting second baseman due to an injury to Devon Travis. It was at this time that Blue Jays' hitting coach, Brook Jacoby, made a change to Goins' batting stance. Rather than hold the bat above his shoulder while awaiting a pitch, Jacoby had Goins lower the bat and rest it on his shoulder before swinging. The change paid immediate dividends, as Goins experienced the most productive month of his career, batting .314 with two home runs, 16 walks, and an .885 on-base plus slugging (OPS) in August. On September 1, Goins hit a two-run walk-off home run in the 10th inning to defeat the Cleveland Indians 5–3. Goins would record the first five-hit game for a shortstop in franchise history on September 30, as the Blue Jays cruised to a division-clinching 15–2 victory over the Baltimore Orioles. Goins played in a career-high 128 games in the 2015 regular season, batting .250 with five home runs and 45 RBI. He played in all five games of the 2015 American League Division Series, and went hitless in 17 at-bats. In game 3 of the 2015 American League Championship Series against the Kansas City Royals, Goins hit his first postseason home run, drove in three runs and scored twice to help Toronto to an 11–8 win.

Goins began the 2016 season as the team's primary second baseman, with Devon Travis still recovering from offseason shoulder surgery. On July 1, 2016, Goins made his professional pitching debut, being pressed into service in the 18th inning of a 19 inning marathon game against the Cleveland Indians. Goins was placed on the 15-day disabled list the following day with forearm tightness. He was activated on August 1, and optioned to Buffalo on August 2. On August 19, Goins was recalled from Triple-A. He finished the 2016 regular season with a .186 batting average, three home runs, and 12 RBI. Goins was on the Wild Card roster but did not play in the game. He was not on the Division Series roster. During the Division Series, Devon Travis suffered a knee injury that kept him out of the lineup for two games. With team management unsure of Travis's health, Goins was added to the Championship Series roster. In the Jays' loss to the Cleveland Indians in that series, Goins batted .200 with an OBP of .333, with one hit and one walk in five at bats (six plate appearances).

Goins recorded the first grand slam of his career in the Blue Jays 8–4 win over the Milwaukee Brewers on May 24, 2017. He led MLB in 2017 with 10 bases-loaded hits. On December 1, 2017, Goins was non-tendered by the Blue Jays, making him a free agent.

=== Kansas City Royals ===
On January 24, 2018, Goins signed a minor league contract with the Kansas City Royals that included an invitation to spring training. Goins earned a spot on the Royals' Opening Day Roster. He was designated for assignment on June 28. On July 2 he was assigned outright to the Omaha Storm Chasers, and elected free agency.

=== Philadelphia Phillies ===
On July 3, 2018, Goins signed a minor league contract with the Philadelphia Phillies. He played in 42 games for the Triple-A Lehigh Valley IronPigs, for whom he batted .220/.291/.315 with two home runs, eight RBI, and four stolen bases. Goins elected free agency following the season on November 2.

=== Chicago White Sox ===
On December 10, 2018, Goins signed a minor league contract with the Chicago White Sox that included an invitation to spring training. On March 26, 2019, he was sent to minor league camp to play for the Triple-A Charlotte Knights. On July 17, Goins was called up, and made his White Sox debut that same day. Goins had 2 hits with a 2-run home run in his first game with the club. On October 28, the White Sox outrighted Goins off of the roster. Goins elected free agency on October 31.

=== Oakland Athletics ===
On November 25, 2019, Goins signed a minor league contract with the Oakland Athletics organization that included an invitation to major league spring training. He did not play in a game for the Athletics organization due to the cancellation of the minor league season because of the COVID-19 pandemic. Goins was released on July 19, 2020.

=== Second stint with the White Sox ===
On July 23, 2020, Goins signed a minor league contract with the Chicago White Sox. On July 27, his contract was purchased and he was called up to the major leagues. On August 31, Goins was designated for assignment by the White Sox. He elected free agency on September 28.

=== Atlanta Braves ===
On February 26, 2021, Goins signed a minor league contract with the Atlanta Braves organization. Goins spent the year with the Triple-A Gwinnett Stripers, slashing .233/.305/.330 with 6 home runs and 35 RBI in 91 games with the team. He elected minor league free agency following the season on November 7.

On March 13, 2022, Goins re-signed with the Braves organization on a new minor league deal. On August 16, 2022, Goins' contract was selected from Triple-A Gwinnett. He didn't appear in a game and was designated for assignment on August 22, later clearing waivers and being sent outright to Gwinnett on August 28. On the year, he played in 90 games for Triple-A Gwinnett, slashing .217/.244/.257 with no home runs and 25 RBI. On October 17, Goins elected free agency.

=== Kansas City Royals (second stint) ===
On January 31, 2023, Goins signed a minor league contract with the Kansas City Royals organization. On October 4, Goins was released by the Royals without making any appearances for the organization.

On October 9, 2023, Goins announced on Twitter that he was retiring from professional baseball.

== Post-playing career ==
=== Los Angeles Angels ===
On November 8, 2023, it was reported that Goins would make his coaching debut as an infield coach for the Los Angeles Angels, under their newly hired manager, Ron Washington.

On June 27, 2025, Goins was named the Angels' interim bench coach for the remainder of the 2025 season after Ray Montgomery assumed managerial duties following a medical leave of absence by Washington.

=== San Diego Padres ===
On December 9, 2025, the San Diego Padres hired Goins to serve as an infield instructor under new manager Craig Stammen.
