= Round Rock Public Library =

Library in Round Rock, Texas, U.S.

Coordinates: 30.5102°N 97.6779°W

- Location: Round Rock, Texas
- Established: 1962

Collection
- Items collected: 170,000 volumes

Other information
- Website: http://www.roundrocktexas.gov/library

Round Rock Public Library (RRPL) is a public library located in Round Rock, Texas

== History ==
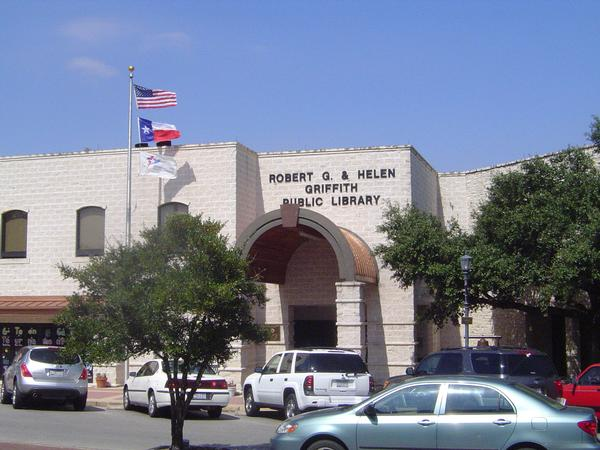
Old Round Rock Public Library building

The original library building stands on a corner lot on the Main Street in downtown Round Rock, the site of the Sam Bass shootout of 1878. The library's plot of land has been used by a variety of business and by the City of Round Rock.

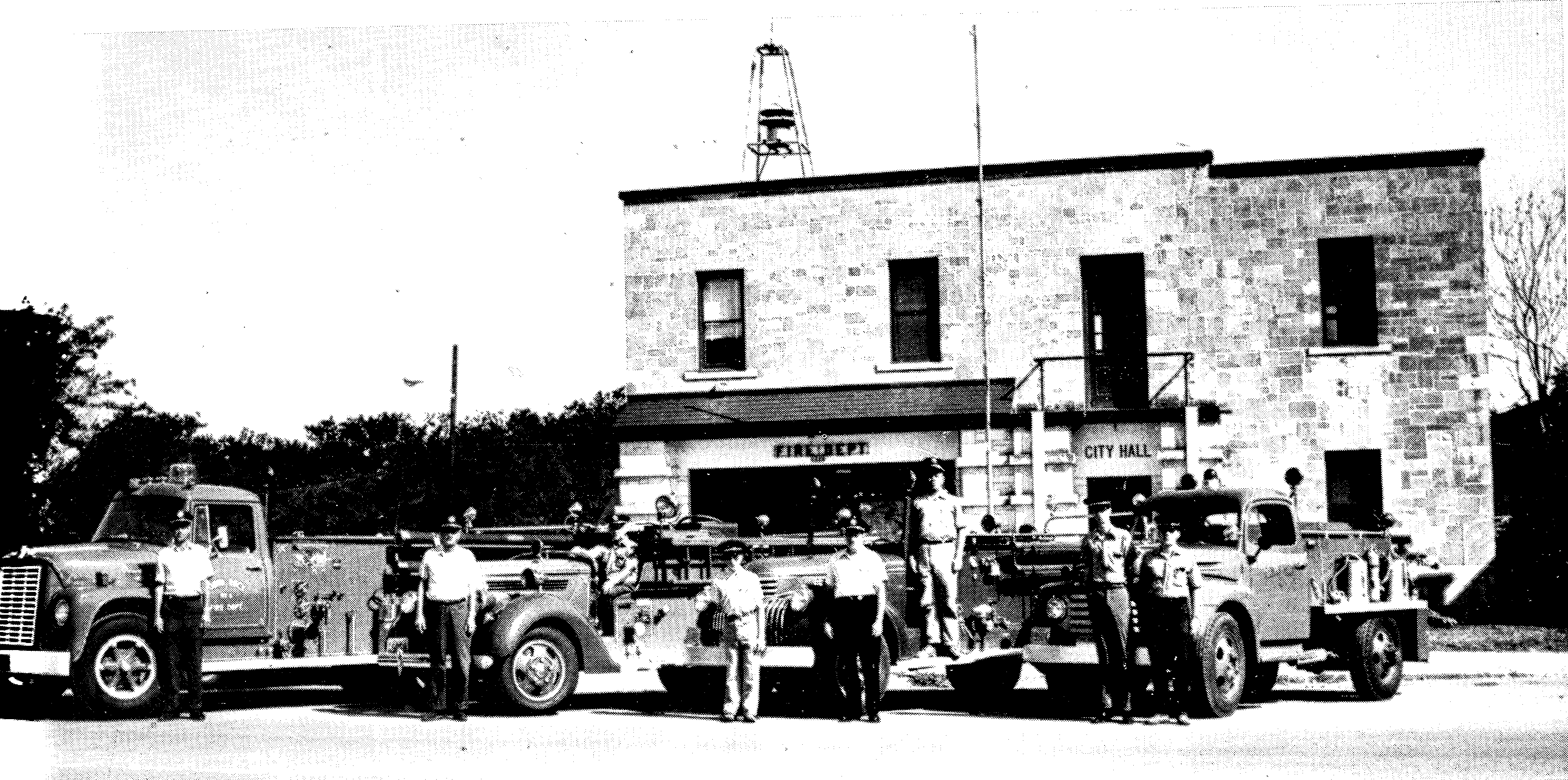
Former occupants of the library's corner: Round Rock, TX City Hall and Fire Dept.

The library's land has had various uses. In 1885, a sash, door, and blind warehouse occupied the east half of the corner lot, but by 1902 the lot was empty. By 1925, when automobile use became widespread, a 30-car garage took over the corner. By 1937, the garage became a Ford sales and service dealership, and a combination City Hall and volunteer Fire Department was built on the western half of the lot.

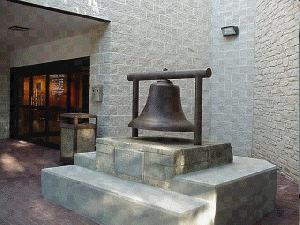
Volunteer Fire Department bell, housed at the main entrance to the old Round Rock Public Library building

The library appeared on the corner lot in the early 1960s. In 1962 the Round Rock Ladies Home Demonstration Club decided that the city needed a library. They organized a group of private citizens into the first Round Rock Public Library Board. Then they bought the old Ford Motor Company building on the corner of East Main Street at Sheppard, where the present library stands. The old showroom provided space but it needed to be remodeled, which took 20 months. The work on the showroom was done by a Round Rock High School building and trade class and by local craftsmen.

At first the state-chartered, nonprofit, Round Rock Public Library Association administered the library. Then the City of Round Rock assumed ownership of the library in 1977.

In September, 1978, structural damage forced the library to close. During the spring of 1979, the library relocated to a temporary building on Liberty Street. Volunteers and community members helped move the books and equipment to the temporary facility. The library served the community there until 1980.

On July 20, 1980, a $0.5 million two story structure was dedicated on the original site. The library used the first floor and the city council chamber took up the second floor. Ray Gill designed the building to retain the historical Texas flavor evident in other buildings on Main Street and to blend in with the existing city hall building.

Need for more space mandated that the entire building be renovated in May 1988. At that time, the library retired its card catalog and installed an automated library system. In 1992, a Library Foundation was formed, incorporated, and granted a 501(c)(3) non-profit classification, allowing it to supersede the Library Board.

In January, 1996, Round Rock citizens voted for and passed a $3.5 million bond issue to expand the library from 11,000 square feet (1,000 m^{2}) to approximately 43,000 square feet (4,000 m^{2}). Construction on the new addition began in March 1998 and was finished July 1999. Remodeling of the old building began right away and was completed December 1999. A grand opening ceremony was held on November 20, 1999, and the library building was named in honor of Robert G. and Helen Griffith, long time library supporters.

== New Library ==
In May 2013 voters approved a $23.2 million bond for the construction of a new three story library building. Ground broke on the new building in June 2021 and the grand opening was held on January 28, 2023. The new building is 66,000 sqft and the final cost came to $37.4 million.

Prior to the city's $4.2 million purchase of the property that the new library would be built on, a bar, Cozy Corner, had operated for several decades.

== Services ==
The Library and the Williamson County Genealogical Society (WCGS) work jointly to make the history of the city, county, and central Texas more accessible to researchers and genealogists. WCGS owns a collection of local genealogical and historical materials that are housed and cataloged by the Library. Both organizations contribute to the upkeep and expansion of the collection, and both provide educational research seminars at the Library.

RRPL has a teen program that features gaming tournaments, a blog, and a book club. The library also offers services for children in the downstairs area of the library, including story time, toddler time, and summer reading programs.

RRPL also offers an online reference service, "Ask a Librarian", which allows patrons to submit questions to reference librarians online and have answers emailed to them within 48 hours.
