= Stony Point High School =

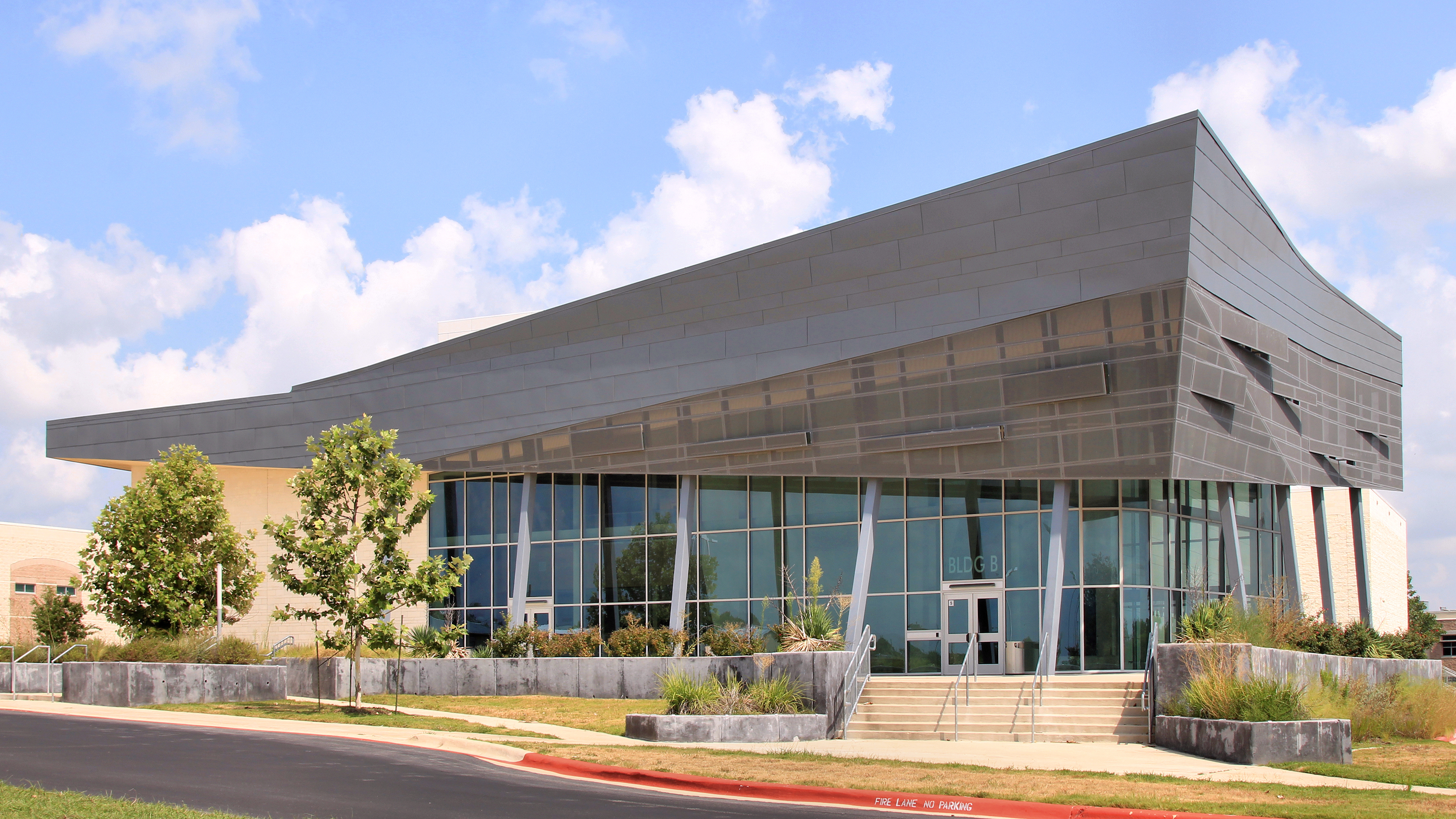
- Stony Point High School Auditorium

Location
- 1801 Tiger Trail; Round Rock, Texas 78664; United States; 30.53014°N 97.66162°W

Information
- Type: Public
- Motto: Preparing students to excel in a global society
- Established: 1999
- School district: Round Rock Independent School District
- Principal: Anthony Watson
- Staff: 156.76 (on an FTE basis)
- Grades: 9–12
- Enrollment: 2,419 (2025–2026)
- Student to teacher ratio: 16.21
- Colors: Navy; Gold
- Athletics conference: UIL Class 6A
- Nickname: Tigers
- Website: stonypoint.roundrockisd.org

Stony Point High School is an International Baccalaureate (IB) high school in the Round Rock Independent School District (RRISD) in Round Rock, Texas, United States. The school received an overall rating of "A” from the Texas Education Agency for the 2025-2026 school year.

== Demographics ==
The demographic breakdown of the 2,419 students enrolled for the 2025-2026 school year was:

- Male - 54%
- Female - 46%
- White - 42.5%
- Hispanic - 29.7%
- Black - 15.3%
- Asian - 6.9%
- Two or More Races - 4.8%
- American Indian/Alaska Native - 0.4%
- Native Hawaiian/Pacific Islander - 0.4%

== Stony Point JROTC ==
Stony Point High School has a Navy Junior Reserve Officer Training Corps shared with Cedar Ridge.

The Stony Point NJROTC is an elective and not everyone that selects the class will enlist or go into ROTC in college.

Stony Point at the beginning of the year hosts:

- Brain Brawl (A contest on NJROTC curriculum and other topics)
- Tiger Challenge (Fitness contest that has the following: Obstacle course, Dodgeball, Running, Curl ups, Push ups, ext)

== Notable alumni ==
- Cam Cook, college football player
- Ryan Goins, professional baseball player
- That Mexican OT, American rapper
- Chris Mudge, college basketball coach
- Trevin Wade, professional football player
