= Round Rock, Texas =

- City
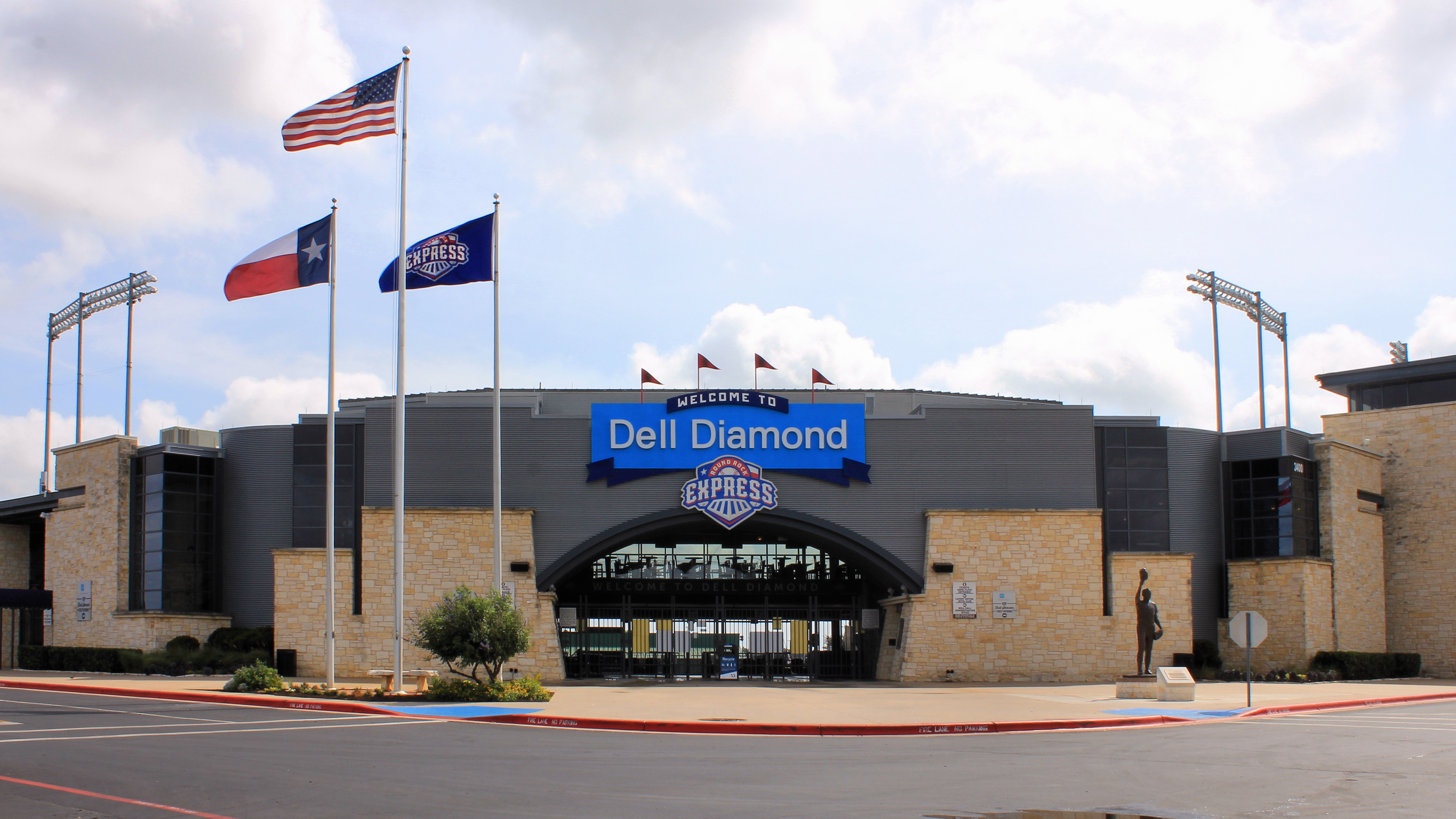
- Dell Diamond baseball stadium in Round Rock
- Motto: "Sports Capital of Texas"
- Interactive map of Round Rock, Texas
- Location within Texas Location within the United States
- Coordinates: 30°30′31″N 97°40′44″W
- Country: United States
- State: Texas
- Counties: Williamson, Travis
- Incorporated: 1913

Government
  - Type: Council–manager
  - City council: Craig Morgan, mayor
  - City manager: Brooks Bennett

Area
  - Total: 38.00 sq mi (98.41 km^{2})
  - Land: 37.64 sq mi (97.48 km^{2})
  - Water: 0.36 sq mi (0.93 km^{2})
- Elevation: 735 ft (224 m)

Population (2020)
  - Total: 119,468
  - Estimate (2021): 123,876
  - Rank: US: 212th TX: 28th
  - Density: 3,174/sq mi (1,225.6/km^{2})
- Time zone: UTC−6 (Central (CST))
  - Summer (DST): UTC−5 (CDT)
- ZIP Codes: 78664, 78665, 78680–78683
- Area code(s): 512 and 737
- FIPS code: 48-63500
- GNIS feature ID: 2411005
- Website: www.roundrocktexas.gov

Round Rock is a city in Williamson and Travis counties in the U.S. state of Texas. The population was 119,468 at the 2020 census. It is part of the Greater Austin metropolitan area.

The city straddles the Balcones Escarpment, a fault line in which the areas roughly east of I-35 are flat and characterized by having black, fertile soils of the Blackland Prairie, and the west side of the Escarpment, which consists mostly of hilly, karst-like terrain with little topsoil and higher elevations and which is part of the Texas Hill Country. Located about 15 miles (24 km) north of Austin, Round Rock shares a common border with Austin near State Highway 45.

Round Rock is the international headquarters of Dell, which employs about 16,000 people at its Round Rock facilities. Retailers in Round Rock include IKEA, Premium Outlets, and the mixed-use La Frontera center.

== History ==
As the area developed into a rural Anglo community, some of the modern paved roads followed the original Native-American pathways. One famous immigration route passed through Round Rock and is called the "Double File Trail" because the path was wide enough for two horsemen to ride side-by-side. It is part of a longer trail from North Texas that crossed the San Gabriel River in Georgetown, Brushy Creek in Round Rock, and the Colorado River in Austin.

=== 19th-century history ===
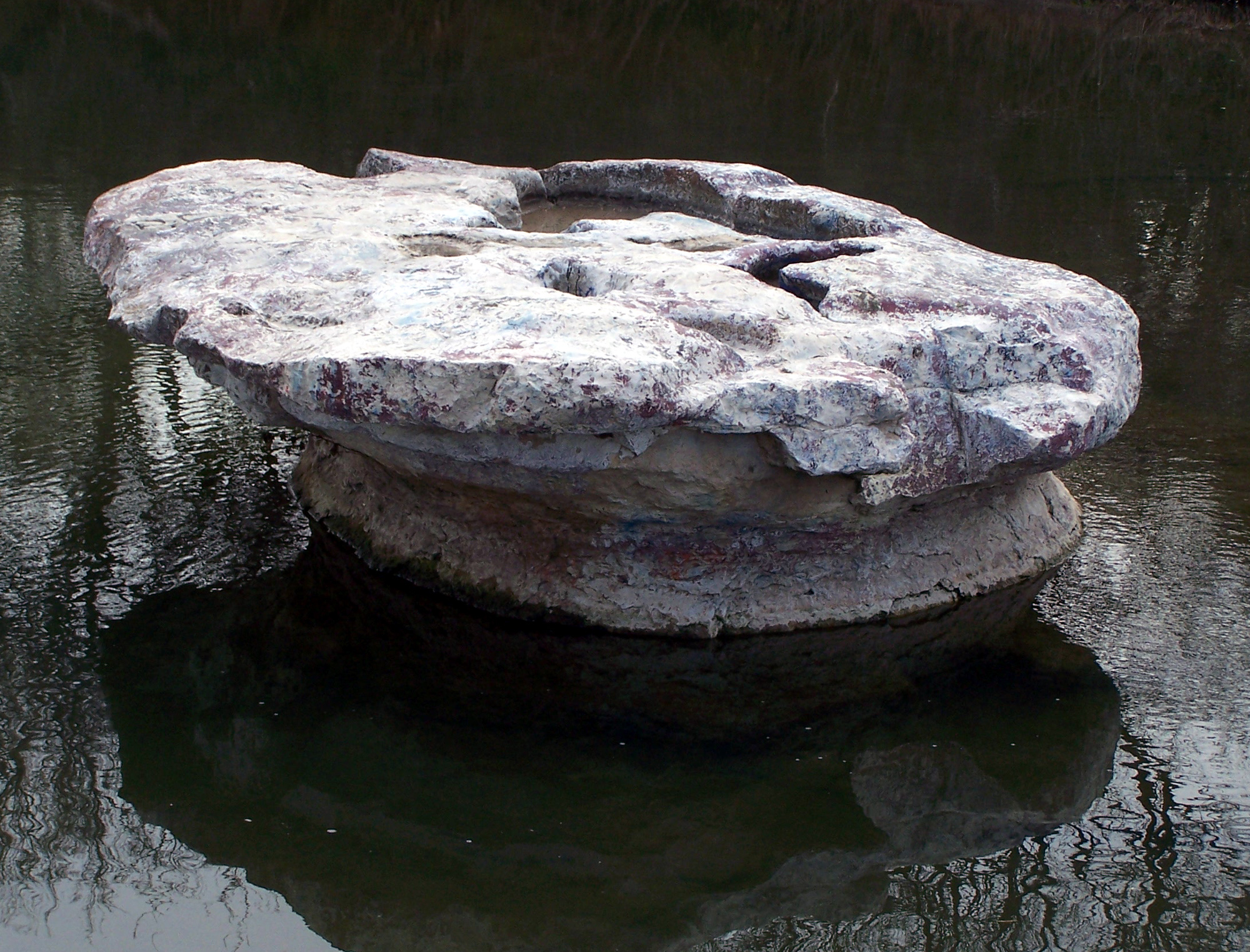
The "round rock" of Round Rock, Texas, in Brushy Creek along the historic Chisholm Trail

In 1851, a small community was formed on the banks of Brushy Creek, near a large round and anvil-shaped rock in the middle of the creek. This round rock marked a convenient low-water crossing for wagons, horses, and cattle. The first postmaster called the community "Brushy", and the creek was called "Brushy Creek", but in 1854, at the suggestion of the postmaster, the small settlement was renamed Round Rock in honor of this now famous rock. After the Civil War, Jesse Chisholm began moving cattle from South Texas through Round Rock on the way to Abilene, Kansas. The route he established, which crossed Brushy Creek at the round rock, became known as the Chisholm Trail. Most of the old buildings, including the old Saint Charles Hotel, have been preserved. This historic area is now called "Old Town".

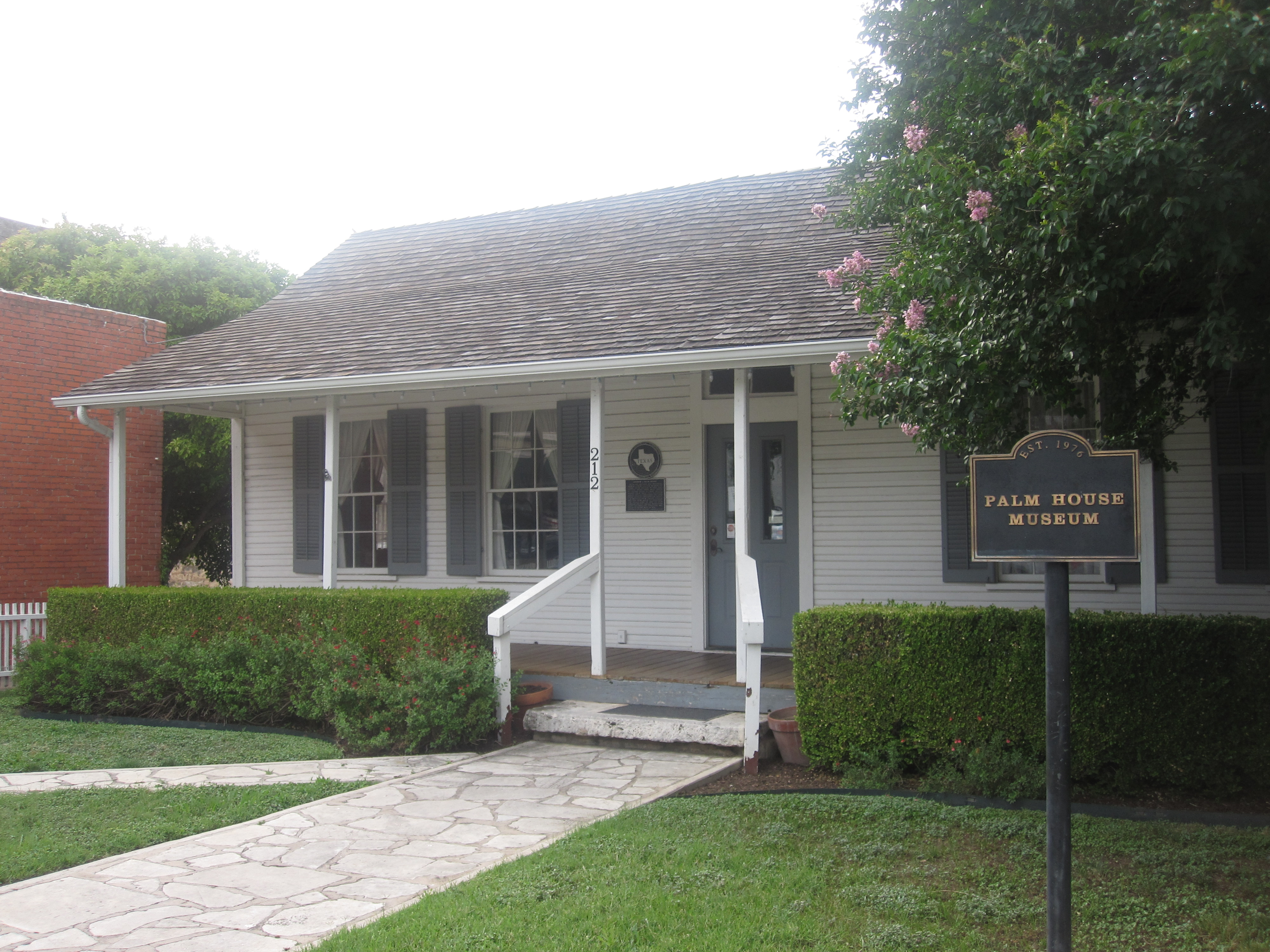
The Palm House Museum in Round Rock

Downtown Round Rock was the site of a historic gunfight and subsequent capture (and death) of the 19th-century American train robber Sam Bass, by the Texas Ranger Division on July 19, 1878. The Rangers followed Bass and his gang after they robbed the Fort Worth-to-Cleburne train. Bass was tracked to Round Rock, and as he attempted to flee, Bass was shot and killed in a gun battle by Ranger George Herold and Ranger Sergeant Richard Ware. Sheriff's Deputy A.W. Grimes was killed in the shootout. Near Ware was Soapy Smith, a noted con man, and his cousin Edwin, who witnessed Ware's shot. Soapy exclaimed, "I think you got him." The event is known locally as the "Sam Bass Shootout". This shootout is recreated each year at the July 4 Frontier Days Celebration in Old Settlers Park. Bass is buried in Round Rock Cemetery, northwest of "Old Town" on Sam Bass Road. His original headstone can be found on display at the Round Rock Public Library.

=== 20th-century history ===
==== Cotton ====
In the first half of the 20th century, the county's wealth came from the cotton fields. Cotton, row crops, grapes, and truck farming were the predominant subsistence east of Interstate 35. West of the Balcones divide, ranchers raised cattle, sheep, and to a lesser extent, goats. Due to Round Rock's favorable geographic location over the rich, fertile "blackland prairie" soils also known locally as the "black waxy" (due to the soil's high clay content), cotton was the largest economic driver at that time. Because of the soil and climate, this ecoregion is ideally suited to crop agriculture. Nearby Taylor, Texas, east of Round Rock, was the primary cotton center where the crop was hauled for ginning (its seeds mechanically removed) at the cotton gin, compressed into bales, and shipped by train. Austin was also a cotton center for a time once the railroad arrived there in the 1870s. Cotton production and cattle raising, on a much smaller scale, continues today, although primarily east of Round Rock.

==== Chisholm Trail Crossing Park ====
To preserve the heritage of the famous crossing, a Chisholm Trail Crossing Park was developed to provide visitors with a simulated scene of Round Rock's historical role in the Chisholm cattle drive. Commemorative plaques in the park tell of the history of Round Rock. The bronze sculptures of four steers with pioneer woman Hattie Cluck and her son, Emmitt, were commissioned by the city through donations from Round Rock residents. The sculptures depict Round Rock's history as a crossing location along the Chisholm Trail. The project plans include 18 to 20 additional bronze statues over time.

==== Old Settlers Association ====
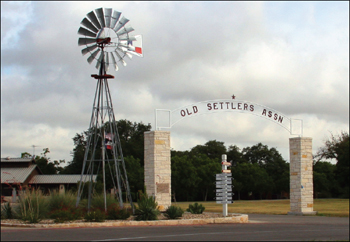
The entrance to the Old Settlers Association facilities in Round Rock, Texas

Following the end of the American Civil War, a group of Confederate veterans held a reunion in Georgetown on August 27, 1904, for the old settlers of Williamson County and their descendants. The invitation promised "good music, plenty to eat, and above all a warm welcome." The event was well-attended, and reunions—now called Old Settlers Association (OSA) reunions—have been held annually ever since. After the initial one, the event was moved to Round Rock and eventually a structure was built (along with three restored log cabins) in the Palm Valley area of Round Rock, in front of Old Settlers Park, just off Highway 79 in east Round Rock. All members of the organization are descendants of Williamson County residents prior to 1904. OSA has about 50 active members and 300 members in all. The Old Settlers Association today is a social and educational group, with the purpose of facilitating social activities, as well as collecting and preserving important historical information and facts. The facilities are rented for meetings, arts and craft and collectable shows, events, parties, weddings and rehearsal dinners.

==== Economic impact of Interstate 35 ====
In the 1950s, planners of the new Interstate Highway System proposed to route Interstate 35 through Taylor, whose population and cotton industry made it the county's economic powerhouse. Highway Commissioner DeWitt Greer called for the "interregional" highway to go through Taylor on its way from Dallas to Austin, but some Taylor leaders and other citizens fought the idea, worried about the possibility of cutting farmers off from all or part of their fields, traffic noise, damage to country life, loss of farmland, and unwanted right-of-way acquisition—it was proposed to be an astounding 300 feet (90 m) wide, unheard of before this time. No one even knew what an "Interregional Highway" would look like, unless they had traveled to Germany to see the Autobahn or the Merritt Parkway in Connecticut. Instead, they wanted improvements to the farm-to-market roads and a straight route to Austin.

Meanwhile, Round Rock leaders sought the highway and its potential economic benefits. Mayor Louis Henna lobbied the Highway Commission. In June 1956, the 15-year debate over the form, funding, and route of the Interstate was resolved. Due to the heavy lobbying, and not wanting to antagonize Taylor, the highway was built along the edge of the Balcones Fault line, running through Round Rock. The precise route was not without opposition, however, as the new road cut off "Old Town" to the west from what had become the more recent "downtown" area east of Interstate 35. The Interstate eventually made Round Rock into a viable and vibrant commercial center, while Taylor withered with the decline of the cotton industry. Today, it is a minor, modest town with a smaller population, while Round Rock has thrived and rapidly grown into the largest city in the county, attracting Dell Computer and major retail centers. The transformation of Round Rock is detailed in a book by Linda Scarborough (publisher of the Williamson County Sun newspaper) titled Road, River and Ol' Boy Politics: A Texas County's Path from Farm to Supersuburb published by Texas State Historical Press.

==== Life as a suburb community ====
By the 1990s, Round Rock was primarily a suburb, with the majority of its employed residents working in Austin and then returning home after work to places such as Round Rock and Georgetown, where housing and land were less expensive. In the 1990s, Round Rock had few major employers and jobs other than local retail and other services, or ranching and farming. In the late 1990s, though, that began to change as economic development became a major focus of the city and the Chamber of Commerce. Dell Corporation moved its headquarters to Round Rock, which has provided a significant number of jobs with 16,000 employees at its Round Rock headquarters.(See also the Business and economic development section in this article.)

== Geography ==
Round Rock is 17 miles (27 kilometers) north of downtown Austin, and 10 mi (16 km) south of Georgetown. Its elevation is 709 ft (216 m). According to the US Census Bureau, the city has an area of 26.3 square miles (68 km^{2}), of which 26.1 square miles (68 km^{2}) are land and 0.1 square miles (0.26 km^{2}) (0.50%) is covered by water. Prior to the 2010 census, the city annexed part of the Brushy Creek CDP, increasing its area to 35.9 square miles (93 km^{2}), of which 35.6 square miles (92 km^{2}) of it is land and 0.3 square miles (0.78 km^{2}) is water.

=== Climate ===
The climate in this area is characterized by generally hot, humid summers and mild, cool winters. According to the Köppen climate classification, Round Rock has a humid subtropical climate, Cfa on climate maps.

Climate data for Round Rock, Texas
Month	Jan	Feb	Mar	Apr	May	Jun	Jul	Aug	Sep	Oct	Nov	Dec	Year
Record high °F (°C)	88 (31)	100 (38)	96 (36)	96 (36)	102 (39)	109 (43)	105 (41)	107 (42)	109 (43)	99 (37)	92 (33)	88 (31)	109 (43)
Mean daily maximum °F (°C)	60 (16)	65 (18)	73 (23)	79 (26)	85 (29)	91 (33)	95 (35)	96 (36)	90 (32)	82 (28)	70 (21)	62 (17)	79 (26)
Mean daily minimum °F (°C)	35 (2)	39 (4)	46 (8)	54 (12)	62 (17)	69 (21)	71 (22)	70 (21)	64 (18)	55 (13)	45 (7)	37 (3)	54 (12)
Record low °F (°C)	8 (−13)	9 (−13)	18 (−8)	22 (−6)	34 (1)	50 (10)	55 (13)	50 (10)	36 (2)	19 (−7)	10 (−12)	−3 (−19)	−3 (−19)
Average precipitation inches (mm)	2.39 (61)	2.45 (62)	2.18 (55)	3.31 (84)	5.00 (127)	3.66 (93)	1.68 (43)	2.30 (58)	3.27 (83)	4.38 (111)	3.34 (85)	2.58 (66)	36.54 (928)
Average snowfall inches (cm)	0.1 (0.25)	0 (0)	0 (0)	0 (0)	0 (0)	0 (0)	0 (0)	0 (0)	0 (0)	0 (0)	0 (0)	0 (0)	0.1 (0.25)

The city was heavily damaged by a high-end EF2 tornado on March 21, 2022. The tornado continued well northeast of the city afterwards, causing additional damage before dissipating. Sixteen people were injured.

== Demographics ==
Historical population
Census	Pop.	Note	%±
1880	628		—
1890	1,438		129.0%
1900	1,138		−20.9%
1910	1,245		9.4%
1920	900		−27.7%
1930	1,005		11.7%
1940	1,173		16.7%
1950	1,683		43.5%
1960	2,458		46.0%
1970	2,811		14.4%
1980	12,740		353.2%
1990	30,923		142.7%
2000	61,136		97.7%
2010	99,887		63.4%
2020	119,468		19.6%
2025 (est.)	141,282		18.3%

Round Rock, with a population of more than 130,000, is located 15 miles north of Austin in the Central Texas Hill Country. It is the 28th most populous city in Texas, according to Texas Demographic Center.

=== Racial and ethnic composition ===
Round Rock city, Texas – Racial and ethnic composition Note: the US Census treats Hispanic/Latino as an ethnic category. This table excludes Latinos from the racial categories and assigns them to a separate category. Hispanics/Latinos may be of any race.
Race / Ethnicity (NH = Non-Hispanic)	Pop 2000	Pop 2010	Pop 2020	% 2000	% 2010	% 2020
White alone (NH)	40,113	53,924	56,027	65.61%	53.99%	46.90%
Black or African American alone (NH)	4,560	9,254	11,552	7.46%	9.26%	9.67%
Native American or Alaska Native alone (NH)	210	288	312	0.34%	0.29%	0.26%
Asian alone (NH)	1,727	5,056	9,668	2.82%	5.06%	8.09%
Pacific Islander alone (NH)	5	105	177	0.09%	0.11%	0.15%
Some Other Race alone (NH)	69	167	714	0.11%	0.17%	0.60%
Mixed race or multiracial (NH)	891	2,135	5,274	1.46%	2.14%	4.41%
Hispanic or Latino (any race)	13,511	28,958	35,744	22.10%	28.99%	29.92%
Total	61,136	99,887	119,468	100.00%	100.00%	100.00%

=== 2020 census ===
As of the 2020 census, Round Rock had a population of 119,468. The median age was 35.0 years. 26.1% of residents were under the age of 18 and 10.1% of residents were 65 years of age or older. For every 100 females there were 96.4 males, and for every 100 females age 18 and over there were 93.7 males age 18 and over.

99.9% of residents lived in urban areas, while 0.1% lived in rural areas.

There were 43,536 households in Round Rock, of which 38.7% had children under the age of 18 living in them. Of all households, 50.4% were married-couple households, 17.7% were households with a male householder and no spouse or partner present, and 25.1% were households with a female householder and no spouse or partner present. About 23.0% of all households were made up of individuals and 6.3% had someone living alone who was 65 years of age or older.

There were 45,844 housing units, of which 5.0% were vacant. The homeowner vacancy rate was 1.1% and the rental vacancy rate was 6.7%.

Racial composition as of the 2020 census
Race	Number	Percent
White	64,290	53.8%
Black or African American	12,145	10.2%
American Indian and Alaska Native	1,014	0.8%
Asian	9,814	8.2%
Native Hawaiian and Other Pacific Islander	206	0.2%
Some other race	11,512	9.6%
Two or more races	20,487	17.1%
Hispanic or Latino (of any race)	35,744	29.9%

== Economy ==
The Texas Guaranteed Student Loan Corporation headquarters in Round Rock

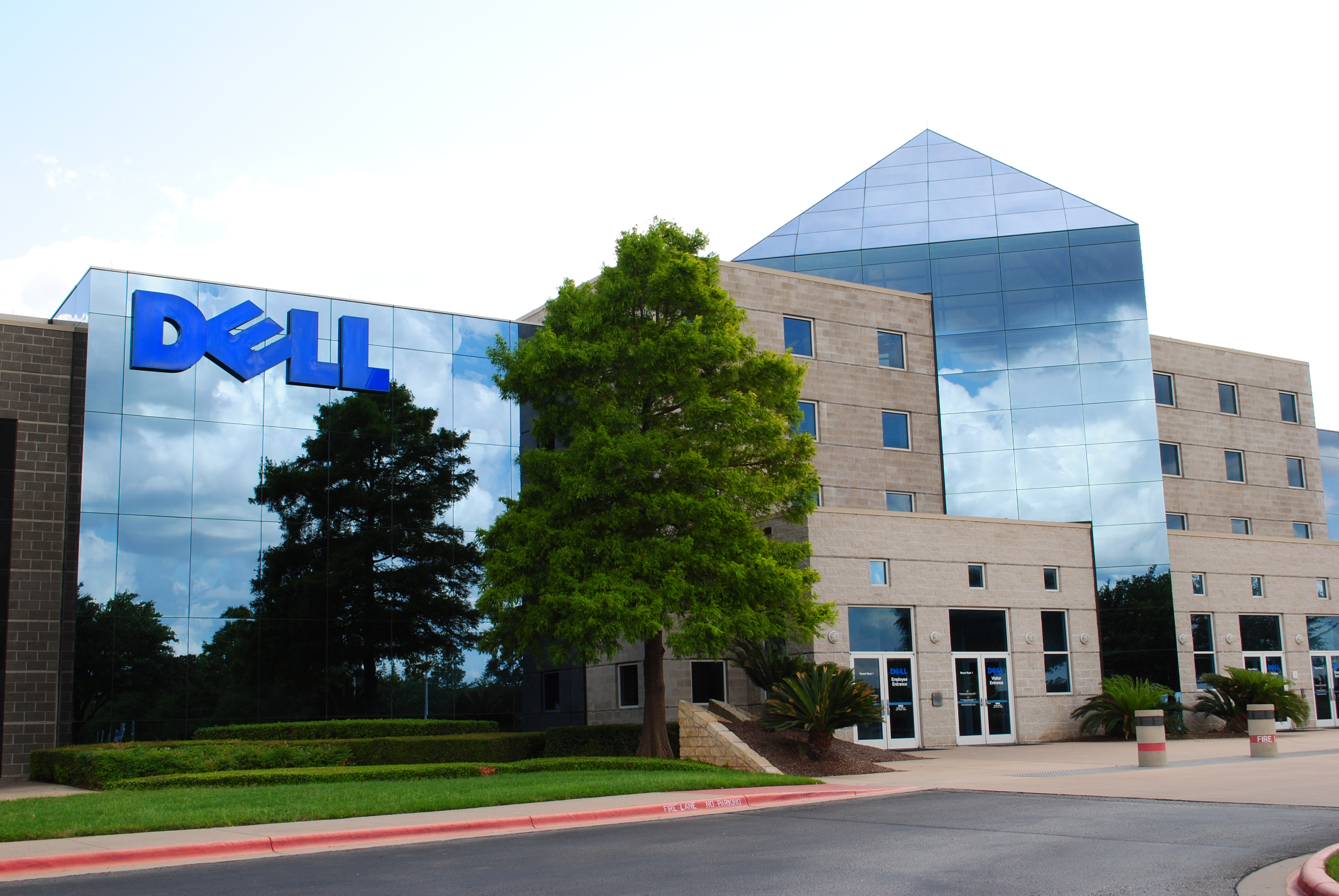
Dell headquarters in Round Rock

The City of Round Rock has maintained a high quality of life while becoming a major center for economic growth in Central Texas, with industry clusters in clean energy, advanced manufacturing, life sciences, and computer/software development.

Round Rock has more than 20 major employers including: Cerilliant Corporation, Cintas, Dell, Dresser, Emerson Process Management, Hospira, IKEA, KoMiCo Technology Inc., Round Rock Premium Outlets, Prudential Overall Supply, Sears Customer Care, Texas Guaranteed Student Loan Corp, Tekscend Photomask, and TECO-Westinghouse.

=== Dell corporate headquarters ===
Dell, a multinational computer and information technology corporation based in Round Rock, develops, sells and supports computers and related products and services. The company employs about 11,500 people in the Round Rock facilities, and as of 2017, about 138,000 people worldwide. Dell was originally based in Austin after its formation in 1984 as PC's Limited by UT college student Michael Dell. With the need for significant space as it expanded, the City of Round Rock in 1996 offered Dell a "Chapter 380" agreement by offering to split sales tax revenue from in-state sales 50/50 between Dell and the city. (A "Chapter 380" agreement is named for the chapter in Vernon's Statues that permits sales tax revenue sharing for economic development purposes.) It was the first time such an agreement had been used in Central Texas and among the first in the state. As of 1999, approximately half of the general fund of the City of Round Rock originates from sales taxes generated from the Dell headquarters. Today, the company is one of the largest technology companies in the world, listed as number 38 on the Fortune 500 (2010). Fortune also lists Dell as the #5 most admired company in its industry. As part of its clean energy program in 2008, Dell switched the power sources of the Round Rock headquarters to more environmentally friendly ones, with 60% of the power coming from TXU Energy wind farms and 40% coming from the Austin Community Landfill gas-to-energy plant operated by Waste Management, Inc.

=== Commercial and retail ===
Round Rock's largest commercial and office business center is La Frontera, at the intersection of Loop 1, SH 45, and IH-35. La Frontera combines multi-tenant offices, company headquarters facilities, 1,000,000 square feet (90,000 m^{2}) of retail, and several apartment complexes and other smaller retail and housing centers. The project also includes Williamson County's largest hotel, the Austin North Marriott, which provides space for large conferences, meetings, and banquets — a first for the county and an important component of Round Rock's economic efforts. The center is also home to the Texas Guaranteed Student Loan Corporation, and Emerson Process Management. The retail portion is the second-largest outdoor commercial project in the Austin-Round Rock metro area. La Frontera was developed by Bill Smalling and Don Martin, with Fort Worth financier Ed Bass as financial partner.

In 2006, a retail-only hub opened in Round Rock at the corner of IH-35 and Highway 1431 (now renamed "University Boulevard"), across the street from IKEA. The major-retailer center includes the Simon Property Group's Premium Outlets Mall, as well as numerous other retail stores and restaurants. The project was developed by Simon Property Group, with other portions by Barshop and Oles of Austin.

Round Rock is also the home of the 'World Famous' Round Rock Donuts, which was founded in 1926.

== Sports ==
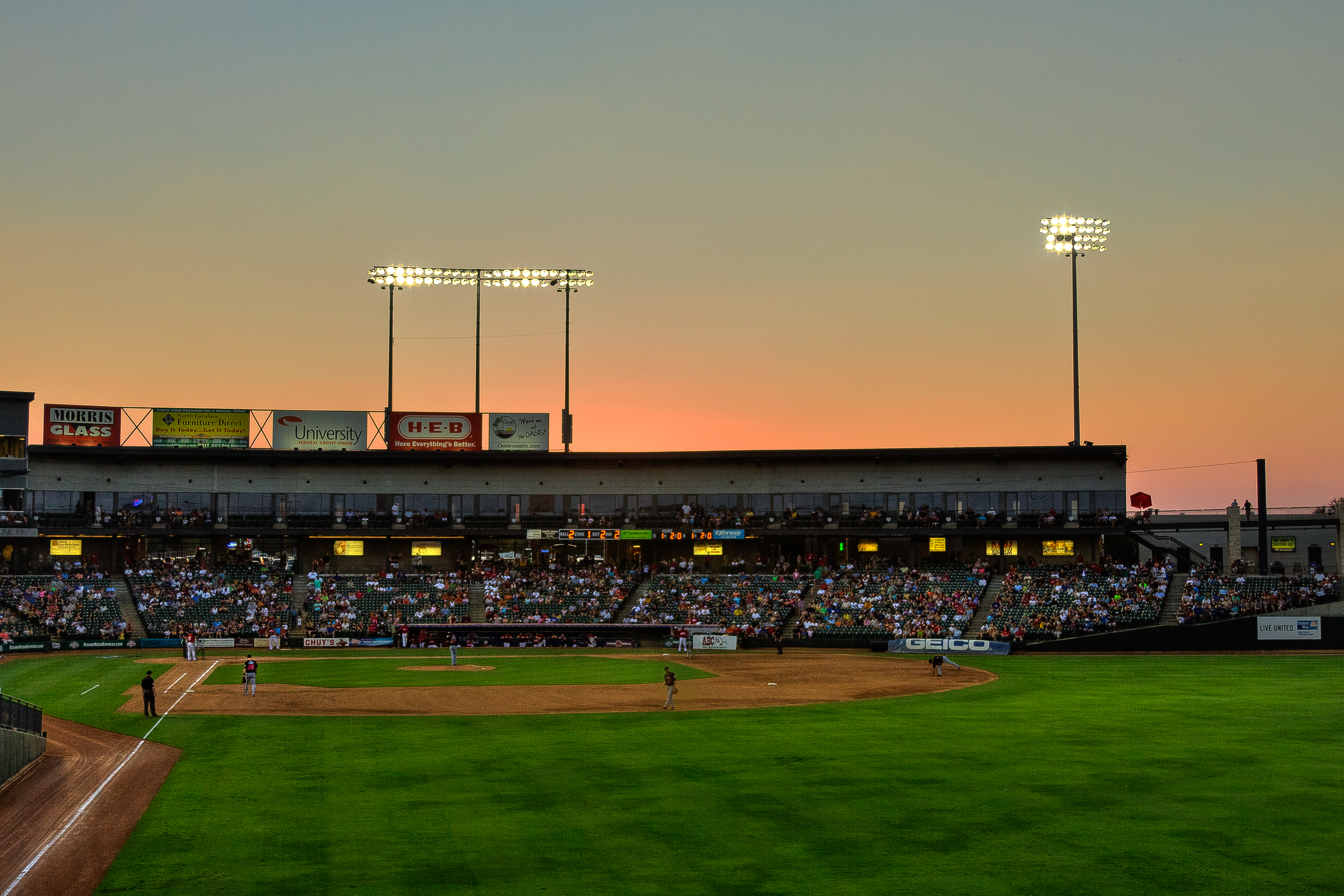
A view of the third-base stands of the Dell Diamond, home of the Round Rock Express

Round Rock is home to the Round Rock Express, a Triple-A Minor League Baseball team of the Pacific Coast League, owned by RSR Sports (Nolan Ryan, Don Sanders, Reid Ryan) and was founded by Reid Ryan, son of Baseball Hall of Famer Nolan Ryan. As of August 2010, Nolan Ryan is also the new owner of the major league Texas Rangers ball club. Home games for the Express are played at the Dell Diamond, a facility that is owned by the City of Round Rock and leased long-term to RSR Sports, which runs and maintains the facility.

Round Rock opened a free public skate park in 2007 behind the Clay Madsen Recreation Center on Gattis School Road.

Round Rock is the self-proclaimed "Sports Capital of Texas". The city's Old Settlers Park offers a professionally designed disc golf course, cricket, cross country running, twenty-field baseball complex, five-field softball complex, and seven soccer facilities in addition to the Rockin' River Family Aquatic Center.

The 11th annual US Quidditch Cup championship quidditch tournament was hosted in Round Rock in April 2018.

== Government ==
=== City government ===
The city of Round Rock is managed through a council-manager form of government. The city council is composed of six city council members and the mayor. The mayor and all council members are elected at large and serve the entire city, not by geographic precincts. The mayor pro tem is appointed annually by council members. City Council positions are not full-time jobs. The council appoints a full-time city manager, who manages the daily affairs of the city, and all council meetings are held at 221 E. Main Street, in downtown Round Rock, on the second and fourth Thursdays of each month at 7 pm, unless indicated otherwise. Council meetings are televised.

=== County government ===
The Commissioners Court is the overall governing and management body of Williamson County, consisting of five members. The county judge presides as chairman over the court, and is elected every four years by all voters in the county. Four commissioners are elected by single-member precincts every four years. While the majority of Round Rock is within Precinct 1, all four precincts include some portions of the city.

=== State and national representation ===
- Texas House of Representatives: State Representative District 52: Caroline Harris (R)
- Texas Senate District 5: Charles Schwertner (R)
- US Congress – Congressman John R. Carter (R), Congressional District 31
- US Congress – Congressman Michael McCaul (R), Congressional District 10

=== Other political subdivisions ===
Municipal utility districts, commonly referred to as "MUDs", play a significant role in Round Rock. Each is a special-purpose district that provides public utilities such as water, wastewater, storm water, and sometimes roads, parks, solid waste, and other infrastructure and services to the residents of each district. MUDs are typically formed by a residential developer as a means to install utilities and roads to a project when a city is not ready or able to provide them. The developer gets reimbursed over time from the fees levied by the MUD, and at some point the area may be annexed by the city to bring the development into the city's tax base once the basic infrastructure costs are paid off. The MUD is represented by its own board of directors, who are voted on by the residents of the district, and it has the authority to condemn land, add additional land area, and levy fees in lieu of property taxes to maintain the utilities and other facilities.

Ten MUDs are in Round Rock: Brushy Creek, Fern Bluff, Highlands at Mayfield Ranch, Meadows at Chandler Creek, Paloma Lake, Parkside at Mayfield Ranch, Siena, Teravista, Vista Oaks, and Walsh Ranch. Total population living within these MUDs is 47,648 (2010 city estimate).

Round Rock's largest district is Brushy Creek Municipal Utility District. Brushy Creek MUD was formed as Williamson County Municipal Utility District No. 2 in October 1977 with 725 acres (2.9 km^{2}) of land. An annexation in 1983 increased the District to 2,210 acres (8.9 km^{2}). The district name was changed to Brushy Creek Municipal Utility District in August 1990. The MUD provides a wide range of city-like services including parks and recreation, full utilities, road maintenance and a Home Owner's Association. Services a MUD can offer, however are also limited by law (for example they cannot offer library services).

Another similar but somewhat smaller MUD in Round Rock's is Fern Bluff Municipal Utility District in the Wyoming Springs area of town. Both MUDs play a significant role in local governance and maintenance of basic utilities.

From time to time, elections to the boards were contentious and heated debates arose regarding other MUD issues. Round Rock does not often annex a MUD to avoiding having to take on the aging infrastructure replacement and upkeep costs.

== Education ==
=== Public education ===
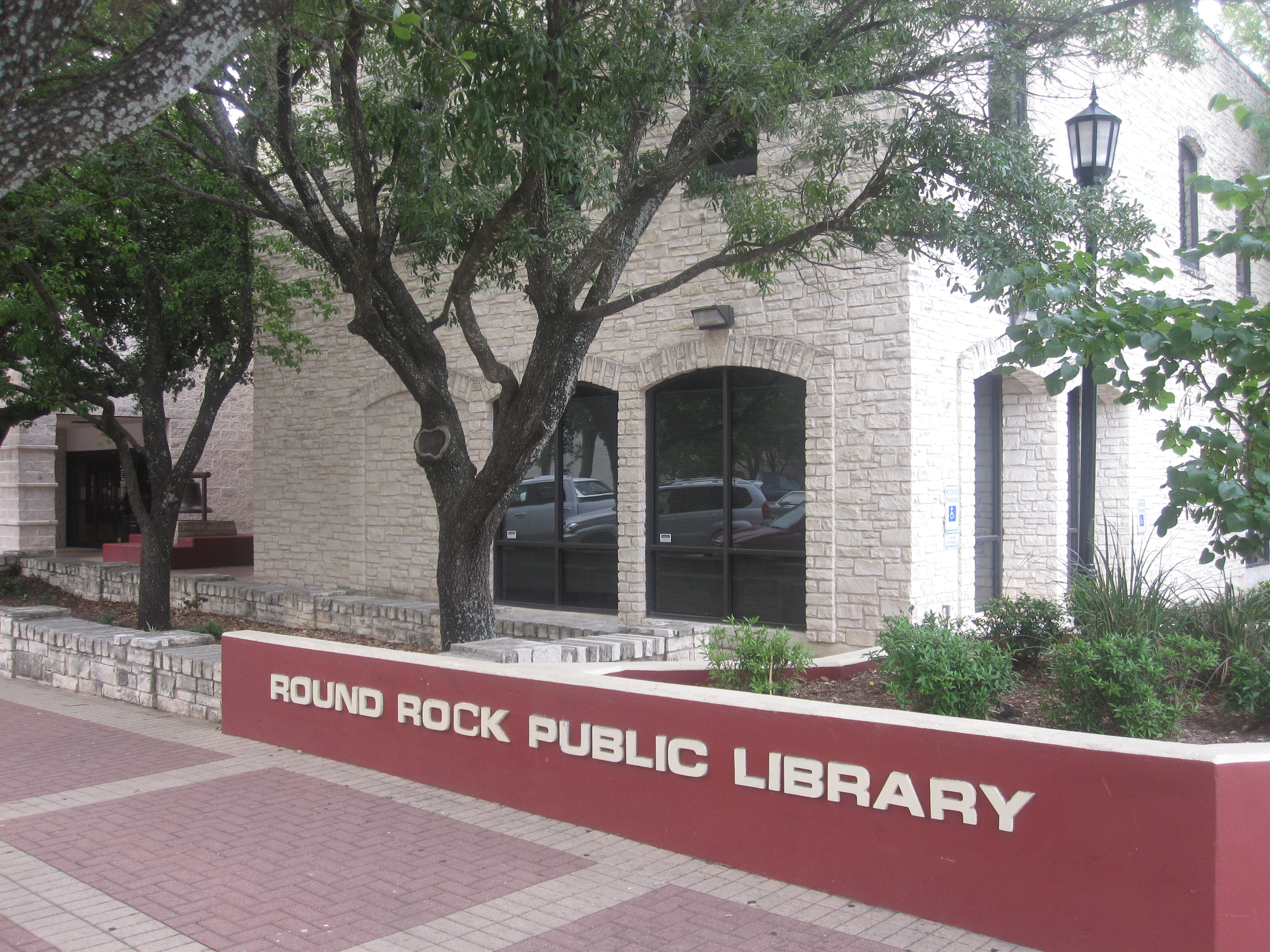
Round Rock's main public library branch on Main Street in the city's historic downtown area

Public education is administered by the Round Rock Independent School District. The district includes southern Williamson County and northwest Travis County, and portions of Austin and Cedar Park.

Elementary Schools in Round Rock:

- Berkman Arts Integration Academy
- Blackland Prairie Leadership Academy
- Bluebonnet Elementary School
- Brushy Creek Elementary School
- Cactus Ranch Elementary School
- Caldwell Heights Elementary IB World School
- Callison Elementary School
- Chandler Oaks IB World School
- Deep Wood Elementary School
- Double File Trail Elementary Leadership Academy
- Fern Bluff Elementary School
- Forest Creek Elementary School
- Gattis Elementary School
- Great Oaks Elementary Leadership Academy
- Herrington Elementary School
- Old Town Elementary School
- Redbud Elementary School
- Robertson Elementary School
- Teravista Elementary Leadership Academy
- Union Hill Elementary School
- Voigt Arts Integration Academy

Middle and high schools in Round Rock:

- C.D. Fulkes Middle School
- Canyon Vista Middle School
- Cedar Ridge High School
- Cedar Valley Middle School
- Chisholm Trail Middle School
- Deerpark Middle School
- Early College High School
- Grisham Middle School
- Hernandez Middle School
- Hopewell Middle School
- Pearson Ranch Middle School
- Ridgeview Middle School
- Round Rock High School
- Stony Point High IB World School
- Success High School
- Walsh Middle School

=== Higher education ===
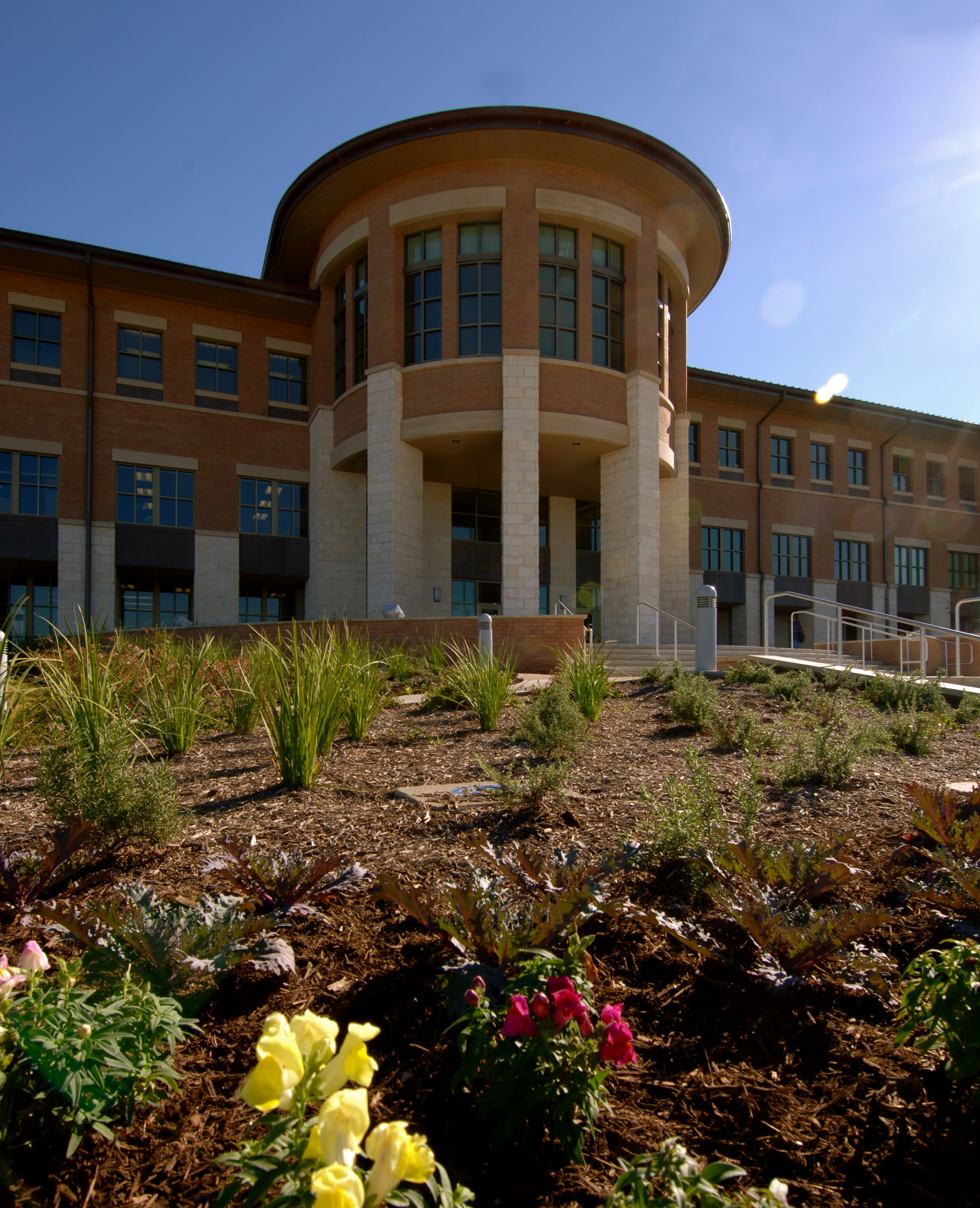
The Avery Building on the Round Campus of Texas State University

Texas State University Round Rock Campus provides training program for work at local companies, such as Dell. In 2009, 1,700 students were enrolled.

A campus of Texas A&M Health Science Center opened in Round Rock in 2010.

A campus of Austin Community College opened in 2010.

The School of Nursing at Texas State University in Round Rock offers programs in health information management, health services research, and physical therapy.

== Media ==
=== Filming location ===
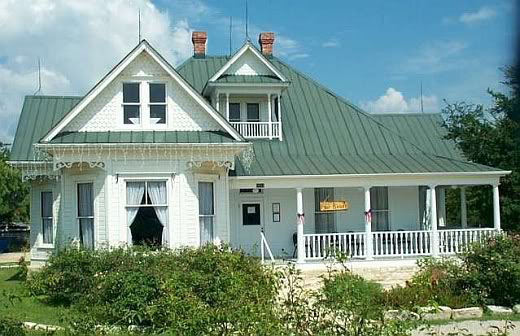
In 1998, the Texas Chainsaw House featured in the 1974 horror movie, The Texas Chain Saw Massacre, was moved from Round Rock to Kingsland, Texas, where it was fully restored.

- The 1974 horror movie The Texas Chain Saw Massacre was filmed at various central Texas locations with a majority shot at two houses in Round Rock. Tours of local sites are available.
- A majority of the 2002 film The Rookie was shot at and around the minor-league baseball stadium in Round Rock known as Dell Diamond.

== Infrastructure ==
=== Transportation ===
==== Major highways ====
- I-35
- US 79 (the southern terminus)
- State Highway 45
- State Highway 45 Toll Rd
- State Highway 130 Toll Rd

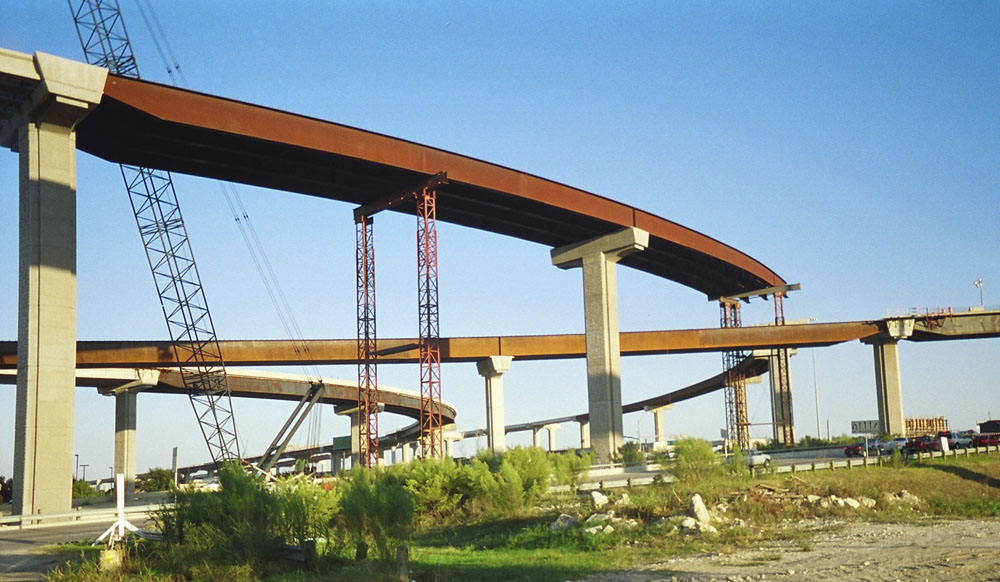
The interchange of Interstate 35 and State Highway 45 under construction in 2004

=== Health care ===
Seton Williamson opened in 2008

Hospitals and health care services serve not only Round Rock and the greater Williamson County area, as well as North Austin. These include:

- Saint David's Round Rock Medical Center, opened in 1984. It is a for-profit hospital with a Level II Trauma center.
- Scott & White Memorial Hospital, opened in 2007. The facility has full hospital services, and transfers some patients to its primary Temple campus.
- Ascension Seton Williamson, opened in 2009. A level II trauma center next to the Texas State University campus.

== Notable people ==
- Barbette, female impersonator
- John Carter, U.S. representative
- Juanita Craft, politician and civil rights activist
- Ryan Goins, professional baseball player
- Colleen LaRose, alleged terrorist
- Donnie Little, football player
- Soapy Smith, confidence man and gangster
- Billie Lee Turner, botanist
- Anike, formerly known as Wande, rapper and A&R administrator
- Jarrett Allen, professional basketball player
- James Lynch, professional football player
- James Talarico, politician
- Mason Thompson, professional baseball player
- Deuce Vaughn, professional football player

== Sister cities ==
- City of Lake Macquarie, became a sister city in 1985.
- Sabinas Hidalgo, Nuevo León, became a sister city in 1991.

== See also ==
- Handbook of Texas
- Round Rock Public Library
