= Sam Bass (outlaw) =

American Old West outlaw

- Born: July 21, 1851; Mitchell, Indiana, U.S.
- Died: July 21, 1878 (aged 27); Round Rock, Texas, U.S.
- Cause of death: Gunshot wounds
- Occupation: Outlaw

Samuel Bass (July 21, 1851 – July 21, 1878) was a 19th-century American train robber, outlaw, and outlaw gang leader. Notably, he led a gang of six that robbed a Union Pacific train in Nebraska in September 1877, stealing $60,000 ($1.81 million in 2025) worth of gold. To date, this is the biggest train robbery to have been committed in the USA. He died as a result of wounds sustained in a gun battle with law enforcement officers.

== Early life ==
Sam Bass was born in Mitchell, Indiana, on July 21, 1851; the son of Daniel and Elizabeth Jane (Sheeks) Bass. He was orphaned before his fourteenth birthday, and afterwards was raised by an abusive uncle. Bass left home due to this abuse at the age of 19.

Bass worked for about a year at a sawmill in Rosedale, Mississippi, but eventually drifted west to north Texas; where he worked for a time for Sheriff Egan of Denton. He tried his hand at wrangling cattle, but was unfulfilled by the hard work and low pay. Bass eventually bought a horse and raced it, living on the proceeds for some years. After the horse became too old to race, Bass and a partner, Joel Collins, formed a cattle drive for several ranchers in the San Antonio, Texas area, including Luther Bounds, who later financed operations for the infamous Fannie Porter. In 1876, they drove the cattle to Nebraska, but squandered their (and the ranchers') proceeds by gambling it away in the gold rush town of Deadwood in the Black Hills area.

== Life of crime ==
Now broke, Bass and Collins attempted to work as freighters, but were unable to make a living. The duo then formed an outlaw gang, preying primarily on stage coaches. They notably robbed the Union Pacific Railroad gold train from San Francisco on September 18, 1877, intercepting the train at Big Springs, Nebraska and robbing over $60,000 (equivalent to about $1.97 million in 2025). The gang split up following this heist.

Bass returned to Texas and formed a new gang responsible for a string of stagecoach robberies. In 1878, the gang held up two stagecoaches and four trains within 25 miles (40 km) of Dallas. Although the robberies netted them little money, they became the object of a manhunt by Pinkerton National Detective Agency agents and a special company of the Texas Rangers headed by Captain Junius Peak.

== A trap is set ==
Bass was able to elude the Texas Rangers until a member of his gang, Jim Murphy, turned informant. Mr. Murphy's father, who was very ill at the time, had been taken into custody and held for questioning. He was not allowed to be seen by a doctor and was prevented from receiving medical treatment, which caused his condition to rapidly worsen. Lawmen sent a message to Murphy informing him that they had his father in custody, and that if Murphy did not agree to meet with them, they would continue to withhold medical treatment from the father. Knowing how sick his father was, Murphy agreed to the meeting. There, he reluctantly agreed to turn informant. John B. Jones was subsequently notified of Bass's movements and set up an ambush at Round Rock, Texas, where Bass and the gang planned to rob the Williamson County Bank.

== Final shootout ==
On July 19, 1878, Bass and his gang were scouting the area before the robbery. When they bought some tobacco at a store, they were noticed by Williamson County Deputy Sheriff A. W. Grimes. When Grimes approached the men to request that they surrender their sidearms, he was shot and killed. A gunfight ensued. As Bass attempted to flee, he was shot by Texas Rangers agents George Herold and Sergeant Richard Ware. Soapy Smith and his cousin, Edwin, witnessed Ware's shot. Soapy exclaimed, "I think you got him!" No one residing in Round Rock, and none of the visiting Texas Rangers (except Jim Murphy), knew what any of the Bass gang looked like. In fact, after Seaborne Barnes was killed and lay on the street, Ware had to have Murphy identify the body, as no one else knew who the man was. Ware himself stated that he had seen the same three men earlier in town crossing the street to enter the dry goods store, but in fact did not recognize them as the Bass gang.

== Death ==
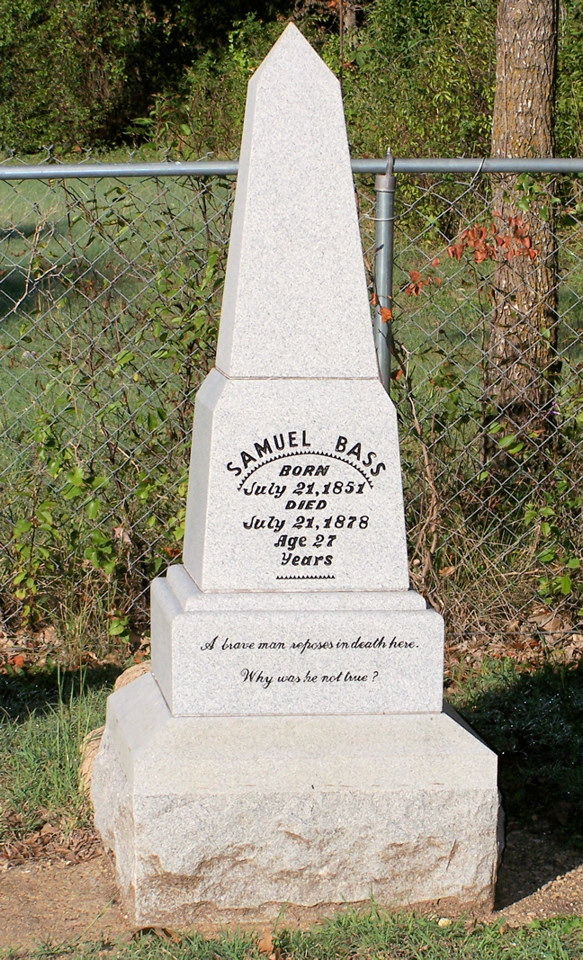
Tombstone marking the grave of Sam Bass, Round Rock Cemetery, Round Rock, Texas

Bass was later found lying in a pasture west of Round Rock by Williamson County Deputy James Milton Tucker. More specifically, Bass had to call out to the posse as they were about to ride by him, shouting, "Hey I'm over here. I'm Sam Bass, the one you are looking for." He was taken into custody and died the next day on July 21, 1878, his 27th birthday. No photograph was taken of Bass either while he was dying in town under a doctor's care or after he died, even though the Texas Rangers were under tremendous pressure from Austin politicians to capture or kill him. To this day no known photo has ever been confirmed to be of Bass, and when his sister visited Round Rock a year after his death to place a better headstone, she indicated that the photo on the wanted poster shown to her by the Williamson County Sheriff was not of her brother. Bass was buried in Round Rock in what is now known as Round Rock Cemetery. His grave is now marked with a replacement headstone; the original suffered at the hands of souvenir collectors over the years. What remains of the original stone is on display at the Round Rock Public Library.

== Legacy ==
There are roads named after Bass in Round Rock, Texas, Denton, Texas, Colorado Springs, Colorado and west of Sanger, Texas. During Round Rock's annual Frontier Days celebration, performers re-enact the shootout in the old downtown.

Rosston, Texas celebrates Sam Bass Day annually on the third Saturday in July.

There is also the Sam Bass Fire Department of Brushy Creek in Round Rock, TX Williamson County.

== Dramatic representations ==
Bass has since been portrayed in several books, radio programs, television shows, and movies.

- In a 1936 episode on the syndicated radio drama Death Valley Days, Bass's last days are portrayed.
- A Lone Ranger episode about Sam Bass was broadcast on April 24, 1944, taking great liberties with the facts.
- Calamity Jane and Sam Bass is a 1949 American Western film directed by George Sherman and starring Yvonne De Carlo, Howard Duff and Dorothy Hart.
- In a 1951 Western movie The Texas Rangers, Sam Bass is played by William Bishop.
- In a 1952 Western movie Outlaw Women, Sam Bass is played by Leonard Penn.
- In 1953, Sam Bass was the antagonist in a newspaper daily strip story about Laredo Crockett by Bob Schoenke.
- 1957 Tales of Wells Fargo Season 1 Episode 10; Main Character Jim Hardie is ordered to infiltrate Sam Bass' gang so that he can learn where they hole up between raids. Sam Bass is played by Chuck Connors. Michael Landon plays a young man in this episode.
- "End of an Outlaw," aired on 29 November 1957 as the ninth episode of the CBS series Trackdown, starring Robert Culp as Texas Ranger Hoby Gilman, dramatizes the foiling of the bank robbery in Round Rock, and the death of Bass during the ensuing gun battle. Gilman was substituted for the real-life Rangers involved. Bass was portrayed by John Anderson.
- In 1959, Alan Hale Jr. played Bass in the episode "The Saga of Sam Bass", on the ABC/Warner Bros. western television series Colt .45.
- The 2015 Western movie Kill or Be Killed was loosely inspired by outlaw Sam Bass and his gang.
