= Frontera =

Frontera (Spanish "border") may refer to:

== Geography ==
=== Argentina ===
- Frontera, Santa Fe, a town in Castellanos Department, Santa Fe province

=== Chile ===
- La Frontera (Chile), a geographical region in Chile, bordering on Araucanía

=== Mexico ===
- Fronteras, Sonora
- Frontera Municipality, a municipality in Coahuila state
- Ciudad Frontera, a town in Coahuila state
- Frontera, Tabasco, a town in Centla Municipality, Tabasco state

=== Spain ===
- La Frontera, the Border of Granada, a region in southern Spain
- La Frontera, Cuenca, a municipality in province of Cuenca, Castile-La Mancha, Spain
- La Frontera, Santa Cruz de Tenerife, a municipality in province of Santa Cruz de Tenerife, Canary Islands, Spain
- Arcos de la Frontera, a municipality in province of Cádiz, Andalusia, Spain
- Jerez de la Frontera, a municipality in province of Cádiz, Andalusia, Spain
- Vejer de la Frontera, a municipality in province of Cádiz, Andalusia, Spain

=== United States ===
- La Frontera (Round Rock, Texas), a development in Texas, USA

== Books and publications ==
- Frontera (Tijuana), a newspaper
- Editorial Frontera, Argentine comics publisher
- Frontera, a 1984 science fiction novel by Lewis Shiner
- La Frontera (newspaper), a former newspaper in South Texas, United States
- Borderlands/La Frontera: The New Mestiza, a 1987 Gloria E. Anzaldúa book
- La Frontera, a newsletter of Association for Borderlands Studies

== Film and television ==
- Frontera (1980 film), a Mexican film
- Frontera (2014 film), an American film
- The Frontier (1991 film) (La Frontera), a Chilean film
- The Crossing (2020 film) (La Frontera), a documentary film
- La frontera (TV series), Mexican telenovela

== Music ==
- La Frontera (band), a Spanish rock band, played at 1994 Caribana Festival
- Frontera, a 2021 album by Fly Pan Am

== Other ==
- Opel/Vauxhall/Holden/Chevrolet Frontera, an early body-on-frame SUV developed by Isuzu
- Opel/Vauxhall Frontera, a rebadged Citroën C3 Aircross
- Frontera Grill, a restaurant in Chicago, Illinois, US

== See also ==
- Frontera Sur (disambiguation)
- Fronteras
