= Antlers Hotel (Kingsland, Texas) =

Railroad-themed resort in Texas, U.S.

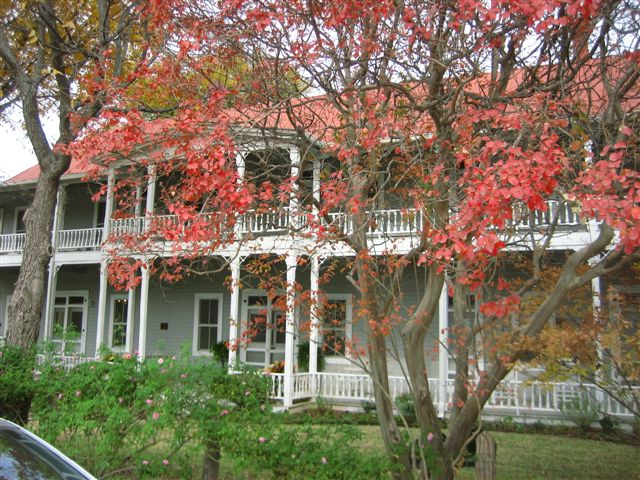
- Antlers Hotel front porch, c. 2008
- Interactive map of the Antlers Hotel area

General information
- Location: Kingsland, Texas, 1001 King Street
- Coordinates: 30°39′37″N 98°26′11″W
- Opening: September 1, 1996

Technical details
- Floor count: 2

Other information
- Number of rooms: 26
- Number of suites: 25
- Number of restaurants: 1

Website
- www.theantlers.com
- Antlers Hotel
- U.S. Historic district – Contributing property
- Location within Texas Location within the United States
- Part of: Austin and Northwestern Railroad Historic District-Fairland to Llano (ID97001161)
- Designated CP: October 6, 1997
- Constructed in 1901, restored in 1993-1996

The Antlers Hotel is a hotel and resort built in 1901 by the Austin and Northwestern Railroad on the Colorado River in Kingsland in Llano County in Central Texas. After a brief heyday, The Antlers closed in 1923 and fell into disrepair. It was eventually resurrected by a couple from Austin and reopened in 1996. It was listed on the National Register of Historic Places in 1997 as part of the Austin and Northwestern Railroad Historic District-Fairland to Llano historic district.

The Victorian structure is the centerpiece of what has become an historic railway district. Other railroad buildings have been added, among them a depot and three brightly painted cabooses setting on actual rails which have also been modified to serve as guest accommodations. The transformation continues whenever additional authentic old railroad structures are occasionally found, renovated and added to the resort. In 2002, The Antlers was designated a Recorded Texas Historic Landmark, Marker No. 15150.

== History of Kingsland and construction of the hotel ==
In 1892, the Austin and Northwestern Railroad constructed a bridge across the Colorado River and a depot in Kingsland south of the point where the Colorado River meets the Llano River. The Antlers Hotel was begun in 1900 and opened on May 1, 1901. Framed newspapers hanging around the hotel show events on that date including the cross-country trip by U.S. President William McKinley, who toured Austin by train on May 3, 1901. He was assassinated in Buffalo, New York, a few months later on September 5.

== The Antlers Hotel ==
The Antlers Hotel was named in part for the Antlers Hotel in Colorado Springs, Colorado, a new and fashionable railroad resort that opened a few years earlier. The Antlers is also named because Llano County was and remains a deer hunting area.

The hotel had all the modern conveniences of the day, including gas lights and a telephone in the lobby. The owners thought that electricity was a passing fad. All the camps had telephones so that guests could call in orders to the hotel kitchen. The hotel had eleven rooms with expansion capability for additional guests by placing hammocks on the wide porches. The hotel was in the center of a campground known as Campa Pajama that stretched down to Crescent Lake, formed by a 1,000 foot lock across the Colorado River. The lock was later destroyed in a flood. The since-renamed Lake LBJ was created in 1951 with the construction of the Wirtz Dam.

== Historic district ==
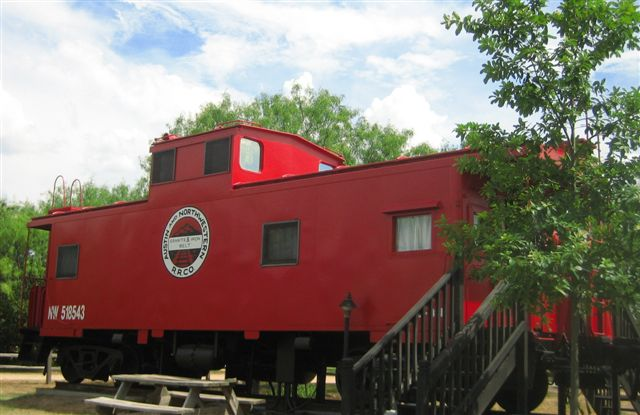
Three cabooses were restored for special guest accommodations

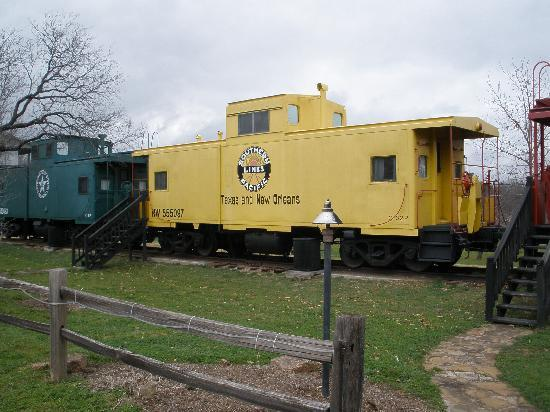
Each caboose was restored to become a hotel suite.

The hotel and adjacent area is part of Austin and Northwestern Railroad Historic District-Fairland to Llano, which was listed on the National Register of Historic Places in 1997. The historic district is generally a linear 30-mile (48 km) strip along the railroad; the hotel is one of three exceptions where the district extends beyond a 100 ft (30 m) width of the right-of-way the tracks.

The two-story hotel, built in 1901 to encourage tourism, is a contributing building. To the west of the hotel is a bunkhouse or hotel annex that was used to house peak-season guests, hotel staff and train crews. Just north of the bunkhouse is a small three-room cabin (worker's building) that was typical of several cabins spaced around the property. A small tool storage shed behind the hotel is the fourth contributing building in the district. The architectural details of the hotel, bunkhouse, and cabin indicate that all were built around the same time.

Further Antlers-associated items are a water tower foundation, a pump house, and a cistern which are contributing structures. The final listed element, in the field in front of the hotel, which is now the parking lot of the Grand Central Cafe and Club Car Bar, is the site of a large wooden pavilion used for dances and community gatherings, designated a contributing site in the National Register listing.

The Kingsland Depot, built c. 1892 was directly in front of the hotel between the main line and the sidetrack that still exist. The depot site is also a contributing site of the historic district.

Across the road from the bunkhouse is the house of the Section Master who presided over a section of the railroad. This house was bought from the Southern Pacific Railroad in the 1940s. This structure is not within the district boundary and therefore is not listed as contributing or non-contributing.

== Early 1900s history ==
1900 and 1901 were a time of consolidations in the railroad industry. The Austin and Northwestern Railroad had begun construction of the hotel and by the time it opened in 1901, the railroad and its hotel had been acquired by the Houston and Texas Central Railroad. The cast iron pot-belly stove in the dining room carries the H&TCR logo for the Houston and Texas Central Railroad, which was itself acquired by the Texas and New Orleans Railroad and then the Southern Pacific Railroad.

The hotel was a fashionable resort and on weekends the railroad ran an excursion train out from Austin for a $1.50 round trip fare. The hotel also served traveling salesmen or "drummers" and cattlemen. The hotel operated successfully until the 1920s when automobile travel eroded the reliance on train excursions. The novelty of the lake by the rails faded as a vacation destination and the hotel closed in 1923.

== Restoration ==
A fire destroyed much of Kingsland in 1922, and the town fell into decline. The property was purchased in 1923 by the Barrow family of Austin, who used it as a private family retreat for seventy years until 1993, at which time the hotel itself had fallen into disrepair.

The hotel was purchased in 1993 by an Austin couple who worked for more than two years in its restoration. It reopened on September 1, 1996, with Lori and Anthony Mayfield, the master carpenter on the restoration, as the managers. In addition to the restored hotel, there are several renovated cabins, a depot, and three colored cabooses (formerly of the Norfolk and Western Railroad) which are also used as guest accommodations. There is also a conference room, and other turn-of-the-century buildings. The hotel has become a center of restoration and growth for the area. The Antlers is located on fifteen acres of land.

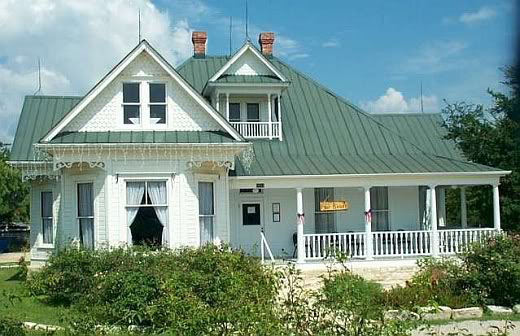
The Chainsaw Massacre House was moved from the La Frontera site in Round Rock to the Antlers Hotel in 1993 and restored for use as a restaurant.

== The former "Texas Chainsaw" House ==
The Texas Chainsaw House (now the "Grand Central Cafe and Club Car Bar" restaurant) is a Victorian house now located on the grounds of the Antlers Hotel and was used in the filming of The Texas Chain Saw Massacre during 1973, when it was still in its original location. The house then sat vacant and fell into disrepair. In 1993 it was moved from the La Frontera development in Williamson County by the owners of the hotel. Once on site it was extensively renovated and converted into a restaurant.
