= Austin and Northwestern Railroad Historic District-Fairland to Llano =

Historic district in Texas, United States

- Austin and Northwestern Railroad Historic District--Fairland to Llano
- U.S. National Register of Historic Places
- U.S. Historic district
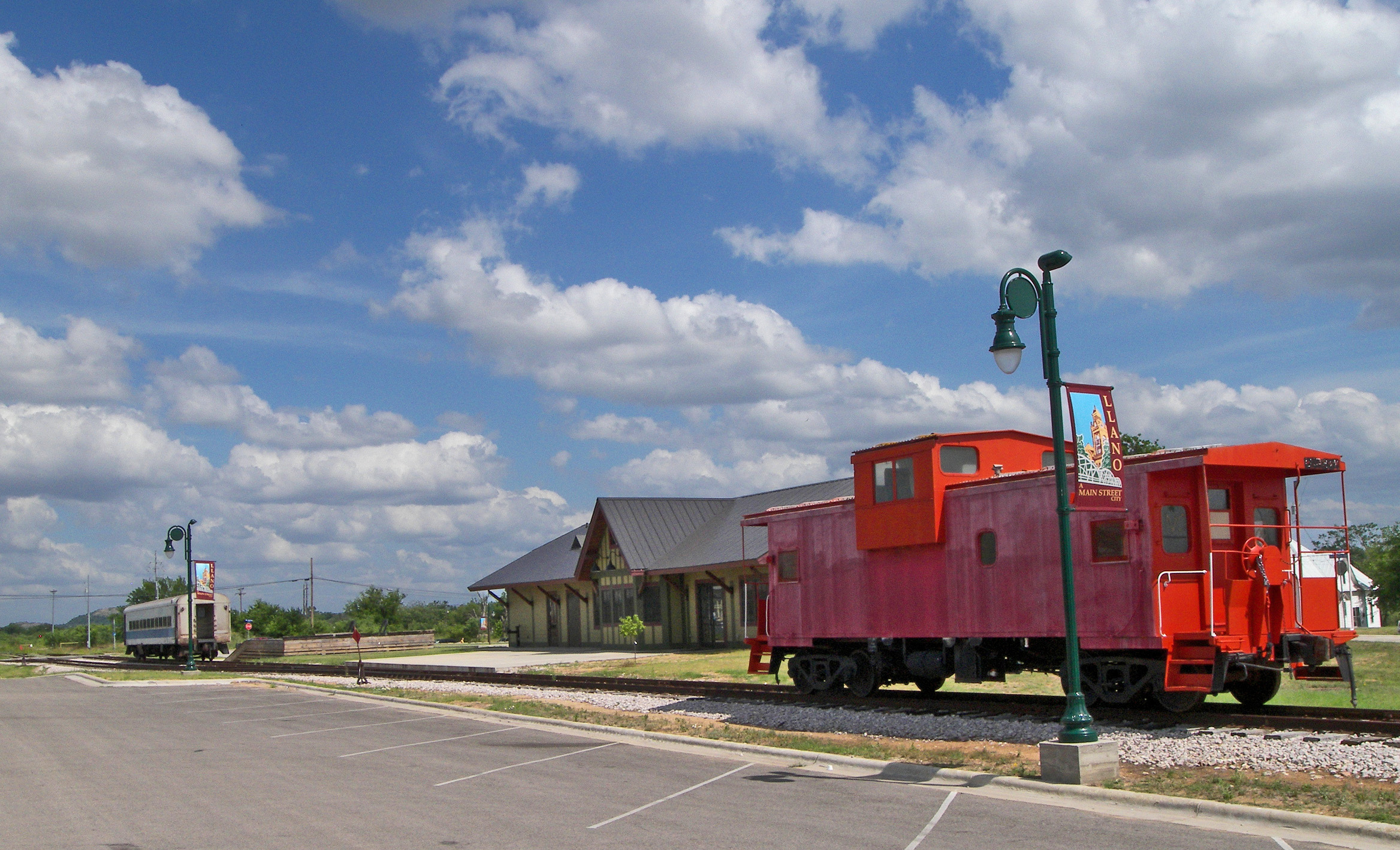

- Location within Texas
- Nearest city: Kingsland, Texas
- Coordinates: 30°39′38″N 98°26′12″W
- Area: 380 acres (1.5 km^{2})
- Built: 1891
- NRHP reference No.: 97001161
- Added to NRHP: October 6, 1997

The Austin and Northwestern Railroad Historic District-Fairland to Llano is a 380-acre (1.5 km^{2}) historic district in Burnet County and Llano County, Texas, United States. It was listed on the National Register of Historic Places in 1997. The listing included four contributing buildings, 43 contributing structures, and three contributing sites.

It is located near Kingsland, Texas and runs roughly along railroad tracks from Fairland to Llano. It also was known as Southern Pacific Railroad—Fairland to Llano branch.

The historic district is generally a linear 30-mile (48 km) strip along the railroad with a 100 ft (30 m) width of the right-of-way for the tracks. The three exceptions to this are the Fairland wye, the Antlers Hotel in Kingsland and the original depot in Llano, Texas.

== See also ==
- Austin and Northwestern Railroad
