= Film analysis =

Analyzing film in terms of cinematography, sound and editing

Film analysis is the process by which a film is analyzed in terms of mise-en-scène, cinematography, sound, and editing. One way of analyzing films is by shot-by-shot analysis, though that is typically used only for small clips or scenes. Film analysis is closely connected to film theory.

Authors suggest various approaches to film analysis. Jacques Aumont and Michel Marie in their publication Analysis of Film propose key points regarding film analysis. (1) There is a general method of film analysis, (2) film analysis can never be concluded, as there will always be something more to explore and (3) it is necessary for one to have knowledge about film history to perform a film analysis. They recognize various types of approach: (1) Text-based film analysis (structural approach), (2) topic-based analysis (narrative approach), (3) picture and sound approach (iconic analysis), (4) psychoanalytical and (5) historical approach.

Another methodology is suggested by Thomas and Vivian Sobchack in their publication Introduction to film. They suggest a viewer can observe the following elements: (1) analysis of film space, (2) analysis of film time and (3) film sound. As they focus mainly on iconic aspects of film, they further propose additional elements: the image, tone, composition and movement.

== Iconic analysis ==
Iconic analysis deals with image or picture, and sometimes also film sound. In iconic analysis we try to understand how different pictorial elements convey the meaning of film. There are several examples in film history where image was even more than just a key element of film (i.e. pre WWII avant-garde films, Italian neorealism, film noir, etc.). However, today, in most narrative films (Fictional film) we try to hide pictorial elements from audience and mask them behind the story. In such films it is usually difficult to analyze image as such. We therefore more often tend to observe various other elements like light, camera movement (see Cinematography), composition etc. and try to understand how these elements influence or cross-reference other elements of film, like story, mood etc. As iconic analysis derives from single images and is closely related to techniques of film production thus demanding at least a brief understanding of these technical elements of film, it is mostly a useful method of research for film schools and other educational institutions. Film critics tend not use this method as a "stand alone" approach, but rather use it as a part of other analysis methods.

== Semiotic analysis ==
Semiotics (also called semiotic studies and in the Saussurean tradition called semiology) is the study of meaning-making, the philosophical theory of signs and symbols. This includes the study of signs and sign processes (semiosis), indication, designation, likeness, analogy, metaphor, symbolism, signification, and communication. Semiotics is closely related to the field of linguistics, which, for its part, studies the structure and meaning of language more specifically. As different from linguistics, however, semiotics also studies non-linguistic sign systems. Semiotics is often divided into three branches: semantics, syntactics and pragmatics. Semantic are the relations between signs and the things to which they refer, their denotata or meaning. Syntactics are the relations among signs in formal structures. Pragmatics are the relations between signs and sign-using agents.

== Psychoanalytical approach ==
Ancient Greek philosophy's "overturning of mythology" is a definition for understanding the heightened aesthetic. For Plato, Eros takes an almost transcendent manifestation when the subject seeks to go beyond itself and form a communion with the objectival other: "the true order of going...to the things of love, is to use the beauties of earth as steps...to all fair forms, and from fair forms to fair actions, and from fair actions to fair notions, until from fair notions he arrives at the notion of absolute beauty".

== Shot by shot analysis ==
This is a written description of a given sequence in a film in order of the shots. According to Michael Ryan and Melissa Lenos, when doing shot-by-shot analysis, we start with describing the techniques used in the shots or images we are analyzing. After that, we also need to elaborate what effects these techniques can produce when viewing the movie; for example, camera leads what we see in the film so the changes in camera angles have impact on audience's interpretations of the meanings the movie tries to convey. Some of the techniques used in film producing could be composition (foreground/background, frame/raming, etc.), cinematography (close-up, medium shot and long shot, pan shot, tilt shot, etc.), editing (montage, eyeline match, etc.), and so on.

== Recent developments from internet-based film analysts ==
A number of varied film analysis approaches have emerged and gained popularity on the internet such as those by Red Letter Media and Rob Ager. In Room 237, a 2012 documentary showcasing a variety of such interpretations of Stanley Kubrick's 1980 horror film The Shining, was screened at the Cannes Film Festival and generated wide media coverage followed by a distribution deal. The film has since generated considerable comment and debate from film critics and film communities.

== See also ==
- 3D LUT
- 1951 USAF resolution test chart
- Color Lookup Table
- Computer display
- Digital Picture Exchange
- Glossary of video terms
- Grayscale
- Indexed color
- List of film topics (extensive alphabetical listing)
- List of monochrome and RGB color formats
- Optical resolution
- SMPTE color bars
- SMPTE Universal Leader
- Snellen chart
- Test card
- Test film
