= Texas Chainsaw House =

House in Kingsland, Texas, US

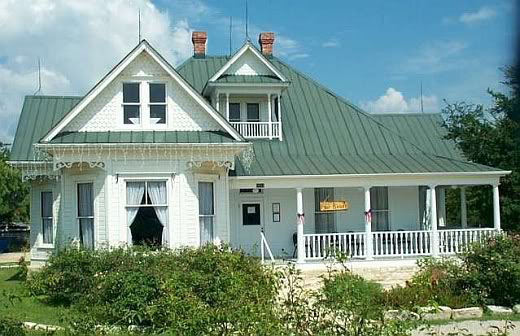
The so-called Chainsaw House was moved from the La Frontera site to Kingsland in 1998 and restored for use as a restaurant as part of a hotel and railroad district.

The Texas Chainsaw House is located in Kingsland, Texas, on the grounds of The Antlers Hotel. This late 1900s Edwardian farmhouse was featured prominently in Tobe Hooper's horror film The Texas Chain Saw Massacre as the home of Leatherface and his cannibalistic family, before it was moved to this location from Williamson County in 1998. The then-dilapidated farmhouse originally sat on Quick Hill Road during the July–August 1973 filming of the movie. The original site is where La Frontera is now located, in Round Rock. (Note: Location of The Texas Chain Saw Massacre farmhouse at Quick Hill – landmark&title=Site+of+%27The+Texas+Chain+Saw+Massacre%27+farmhouse+at+Quick+Hill 30.480277°N 97.692522°W)

In 1998, the house was cut into six or seven pieces to be moved, then reassembled and restored to its original condition by master carpenter Anthony Mayfield on behalf of an investor couple in Austin, Texas. The house was a "pattern book" house, designed possibly by A.W. Selure (a French-American immigrant who designed other architecturally similar houses). Or Carl Carlson (the reported builder of the three houses). Ordered from a catalog (likely A.E. Belford lumber, who sold Selures designs in their catalogs. One of the two houses supposedly contains lumber and other hardware from Nalle Lumber Company. The house in the 1974 film was assembled on site from a package of materials brought by wagon or train. The house featured in the film was one of three identical houses, built within walking distance of each other. One house is known today as the 'Burkland-Frisk house', built for and owned by Leonard Rueben Frisk and his family. This house was later moved as well, to Georgetown, overlooking the San Gabriel River. The third house has little known history; It was sold in 1969 for the construction of the new CR 172, where it sat abandoned with its sisters. This house later burned down and was lost forever. Research indicates the house in the film was likely built between 1908/1909 and 1910, along with its sister home and a no longer existing triplet.

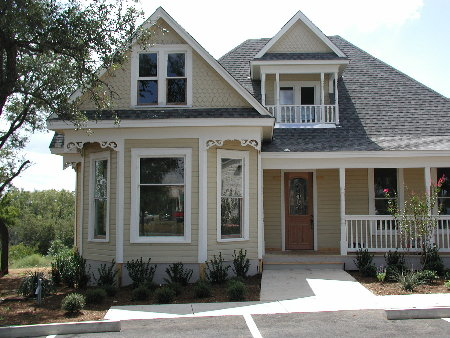
An identical twin house was later discovered nearby and was also renovated and is now located in Georgetown, Texas

== Identical twin ==
A densely overgrown identical twin of the house was later found at La Frontera as well, and it too was cut into pieces and moved, but to nearby Georgetown and restored. It is known locally as the Burkland-Frisk house, as it was built by an early settler in Williamson County, Leonard Frisk, and was later owned by Tony Burkland, a relative of the Frisk family. The house originally sat across the street from the Texas Chainsaw House on Quick Hill Road, but it was later moved to another location within La Frontera and was not originally recognized as a twin because of the dilapidated condition of the house and its being completely overgrown with plants and trees. It was moved in 2006 and restored by the developers of La Frontera, Don Martin and Bill Smalling (1953–2008). It sits on San Gabriel Village Blvd prominently overlooking South San Gabriel River and is used as an office.

=== Film sets ===
Replicas of the original house were built as sets for the 2013–2017 film series, appearing in Texas Chainsaw 3D and its 2017 prequel Leatherface respectively.

A duplicate of the house was also featured in a post-credits scene in Texas Chainsaw Massacre, a 2022 sequel picking up several decades after the original film.

== See also ==
- Antlers Hotel (Kingsland, Texas)
- Kingsland, Texas
- Georgetown, Texas
