= La Frontera (Round Rock, Texas) =

Mixed-use development

Coordinates: 30°28′58″N 97°41′02″W

A fountain at La Frontera

La Frontera is a mixed-use development in Round Rock, Texas. It consists of retail, residential and office properties. The name "La Frontera" means "the border" or "frontier" in Spanish, referring to the development's location on the border of Travis and Williamson counties.

== Summary ==
The 330-acre project combines offices and company headquarters, more than 1,000,000 square feet (90,000 m^{2}) of retail including La Frontera Village, three apartment complexes and specialized retail, banking and a medical rehabilitation hospital. The project also includes Williamson County's only full-service hotel, the Austin North Marriott which provides space for large conferences, meetings and banquets - a first for the county and an important component of Round Rock's and Williamson County's economic development efforts. The center is also home to the 200,000-square-foot (19,000 m^{2}) corporate headquarters of Texas Guaranteed Student Loan Corporation (TGSL).

The developers included stringent design guidelines, architectural controls, landscape requirements, and other codes and restrictions. Primary internal roadways were built and dedicated to the City of Round Rock as public roads (versus using private roads as is typical) prior to individual sites being developed or sold. Significant portions of land were given to the Texas Department of Transportation for construction of the tolled portion of State Highway 45.

A unique combined "bundled utility" concept was installed by TXU (now Energy Future Holdings). The installation was one of the first instances of "bundled utilities" in Texas: gas, electric, data, cable and telecom.

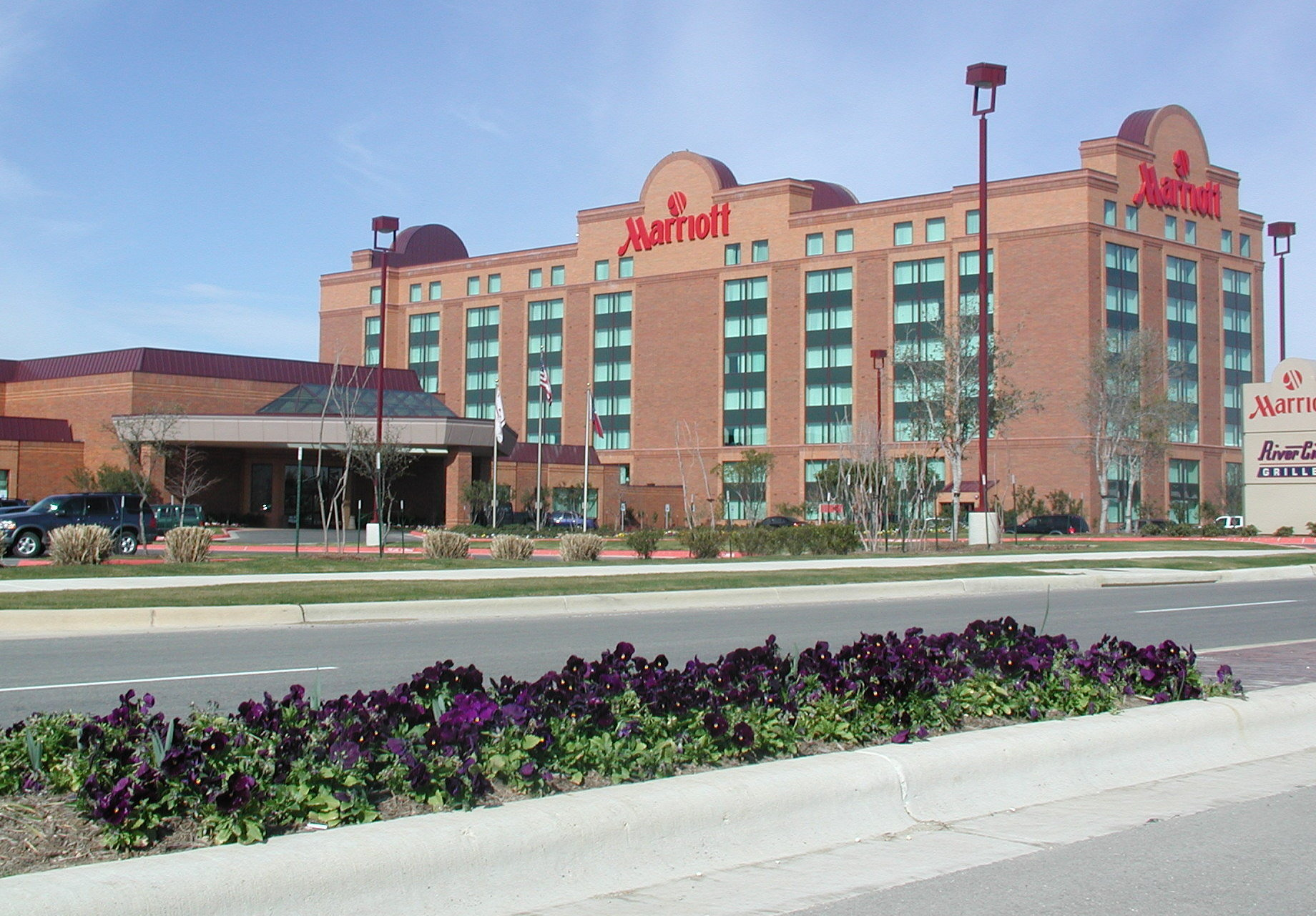
Williamson County's only full-service hotel at the time of its development is the Austin North Marriott, located in La Frontera.

== Phase I ==
=== La Frontera Village retail ===
Phase I of the project was La Frontera Village, which was the first retail portion of La Frontera to be built and was the largest outdoor commercial project in the greater Austin-Round Rock metropolitan area at the time. La Frontera Village was developed by David Berndt Interests of Dallas and Developers Diversified Realty Corporation. It consists of 880,000 square feet (80,000 m^{2}) of retail space.

A separate additional 50,000 square feet (5,000 m^{2}) retail center was developed by Waterstone Development (of Austin), as well as numerous restaurant and bank pad retail sites were sold by the development partnership.

=== Multitenant office buildings ===
Synermark Development also built the first office building, a 200,000-square-foot (19,000 m^{2}) multitenant building called 301 Sundance. Additional multi-tenant office buildings would be built by Koontz-McCombs of San Antonio, and Simmons Vedder of Austin. An additional six story building was built by Live Oak Development of Austin for occupancy by Harcourt in 2018.

=== Marriott Hotel ===
One of the first commercial users to build on-site was the Austin North Marriott hotel, a 298-room full-service hotel with restaurant, ballrooms, executive meeting rooms and concierge services. It is the only full-service hotel in Williamson County. The hotel benefits from the proximity of Dell among other corporate clients. The hotel was built by and is owned and operated by Winegardner and Hammonds, Inc. of Cincinnati, Ohio, a hotel operating company.

Winegardner and Hammonds in 1998 also purchased the final 2-acre (0.81 ha) site out of the original 330 acres, for a future additional hotel.

=== Multifamily units ===
Martin Fein Interests of Houston built three major multifamily complexes within La Frontera: The Enclave; Lakeside: and Frontera Square.

== Phases II and III ==
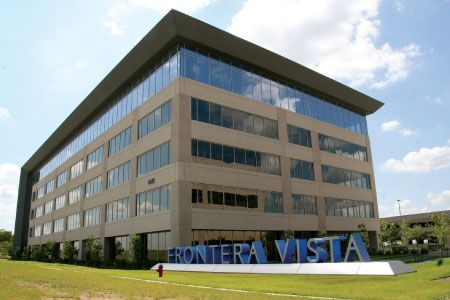
Emerson Process Management purchased the two Fontera Vista buildings for their world headquarters in 2011.

Phase II within La Frontera was purchased in 2007 by the Simmons-Vedder Company of Houston and Austin and is planned for up to 2,000,000 square feet (200,000 m^{2}) of office development. Emerson Process Management purchased the first two office buildings, called Frontera Vista I and II, in July 2011, moving their world headquarters to Round Rock and occupying 200,000 square feet (19,000 m^{2}) of office space with approximately 875 jobs, and a projected 10,000 room nights in area hotels.

Phase III was purchased by Cousins Properties of Atlanta in 1998 for future development.

== Developers ==
Austin development partners Don Martin and William S. "Bill" Smalling (1952-2009) along with William V. "Bill" Boecker were the developers of La Frontera. Fort Worth real estate financier Ed Bass provided the equity financing with Boecker of Fort Worth representing Bass on the development team. The land was originally a cattle ranch and was purchased by Martin and Smalling from Austinite Tom Kouri (1924-2007), who raised cattle on the land and was an astute real estate investor, and for whom Kouri Avenue in the development was named in his honor."

=== Status ===
The project groundbreaking was in 1998 and all land within the development was entirely sold out by 2008.

== Movie site ==
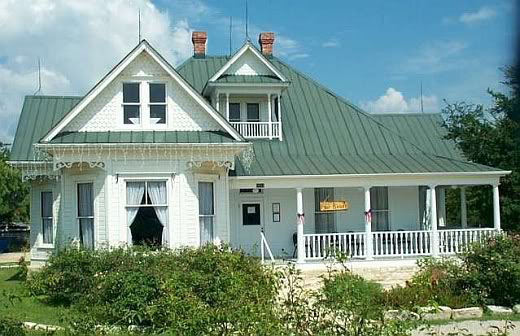
In 1998 The Chainsaw House was moved from La Frontera to the Antlers Hotel in Kingsland, Texas

The portion of the land where La Frontera now sits was the site of the primary filming of the 1974 cult movie classic The Texas Chain Saw Massacre which was filmed in July and August 1973 in a dilapidated farm house on the La Frontera property (located on what was originally Quick Hill Road). Twenty-five years later, in 1998, the house was cut into seven pieces and moved to Kingsland, Texas, reassembled, and meticulously restored as a restaurant for the Antlers Hotel and historic railway district. In Kingsland it is sometimes known as the Texas Chainsaw House. The house was a "pattern book" house, ordered from a catalog and assembled on site from a package of materials brought by wagon from a local lumber company. Research indicates it was likely built between 1908 and 1910. A second "twin" house was later discovered at La Frontera and was moved to Georgetown, Texas. by Martin and Smalling and restored as part of San Gabriel Village development, overlooking the South San Gabriel River.
