= La Frontera, Cuenca =

- Municipality
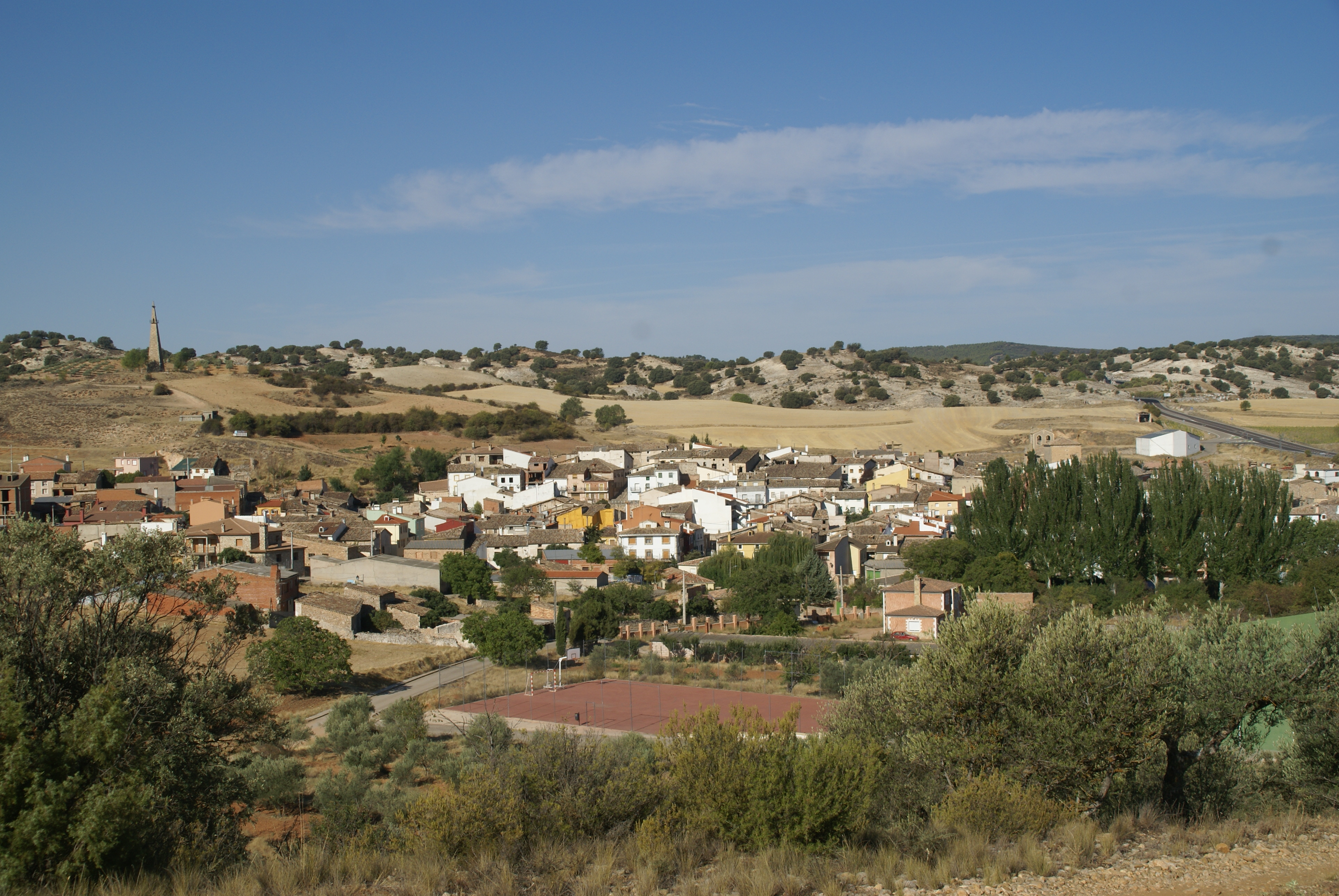
- Aerial view of La Frontera (Cuenca) in 2012

- Flag Coat of arms

- Location within Spain Location within Castilla-La Mancha
- Coordinates: 40.4000°N 2.2167°W
- Country: Spain
- Autonomous community: Castile-La Mancha
- Province: Cuenca

Population (2025-01-01)
  - Total: 155
- Time zone: UTC+1 (CET)
  - Summer (DST): UTC+2 (CEST)

La Frontera is a municipality in Cuenca, Castile-La Mancha, Spain. It has a population of 203.
