= Austin and Northwestern Railroad =

Overview
- Headquarters: Austin, Tx
- Locale: Austin, TX
- Dates of operation: 1881–1986

Technical
- Track gauge: 4 ft 8 1/2 in (1,435 mm) standard gauge
- Previous gauge: originally 3 ft (914 mm) gauge

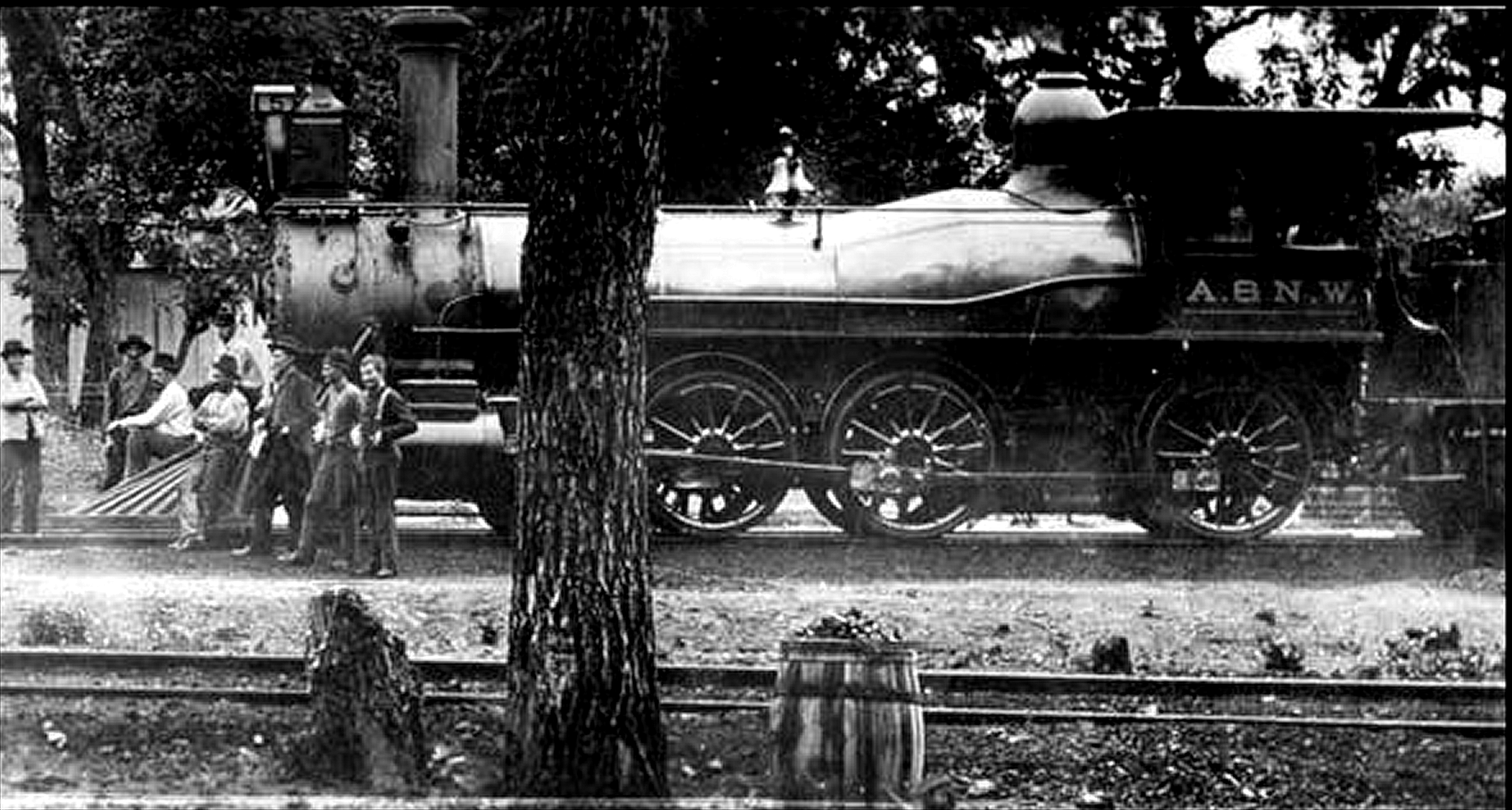
Austin & Northwestern Railroad locomotive in Austin, Texas, early 1880s.

The Austin and Northwestern Railroad began construction on a rail line west of Austin, Texas, USA, toward Llano on April 20, 1881. The railroad was originally built as a 3 ft (914 mm) narrow gauge line with plans to connect to the Texas and Pacific Railway at Abilene. Construction reached Burnet, Texas, by 1882 and the line was later extended to Granite Mountain by 1885 - when the railroad was contracted to haul pink granite for the new Texas State Capitol building in Austin. The company later extended its line 2.3 miles (3.7 km) to Marble Falls by using the charter of the Granite Mountain and Marble Falls City Railroad. Due to a bend in the tracks, trains would occasionally derail, accidentally dumping some of the pink granite. The rocks which remain are a local point of interest.

The line was converted to 4 ft 8 1/2 in (1,435 mm) standard gauge and by 1892 the railroad was extended to Llano. In 1901 the Texas legislature approved the merger of the Austin and Northwestern and the Houston and Texas Central Railroad. As a condition of the merger, a new passenger terminal was constructed at Austin, and the line was extended from Burnet to Lampasas in 1903. The Texas and New Orleans Railroad absorbed the line in 1934, and it was later absorbed into the Southern Pacific Company.

In 1986, Southern Pacific elected to abandon the entire 163-mile (262 km) Giddings to Llano line. The City of Austin and Capital Metro purchased the railroad for $9.3 million, with the intent of using the right-of-way as a mass transit corridor. Capital Metro commenced Capital MetroRail commuter rail service in 2010 on 32 miles of track, running from Leander, Texas to Austin.

The operating history of the Austin and Northwestern Railroad, subsequent to Capital Metro's acquisition of the railroad, is as follows:

- RailTex A&NW (AUNW): August 15, 1986 to May 6, 1996
- Longhorn Railroad (LHRR), operated by Central Tennessee: May 6, 1996 to April 2000
- Austin Area Terminal Railroad (AUAR), operated by Trans-Global Solutions, Inc: April 2000 to October 1, 2007
- Austin Western Railroad (AWRR), operated by Watco: October 1, 2007 to present

In 1997 a 30 mi stretch of the track running from Llano to the unincorporated community of Fairland, Texas was added to the National Register of Historic Places as the Austin and Northwestern Railroad Historic District-Fairland to Llano.

== Cities named after A&NW officials ==
- Cedar Park, Texas was previously named Bruggerhoff, after a A&NW railroad official
- Leander, Texas is named after a A&NW railroad official
- Bertram, Texas is named after the largest shareholder of the A&NW railroad
- Manor, Texas is named after someone who donated land to the H&TC railroad in the area now known as Manor
- Elgin, Texas is named after the H&TC's land commissioner
- Giddings, Texas is named after someone who was instrumental in bringing the H&TC railroad to Giddings
