= Rob Ager =

British internet film critic and analyst

- Born: 1973 (age 52–53); Liverpool, England
- Years active: 2007–present

YouTube information
- Channels: Collative Learning; Rob Ager
- Subscribers: 261 thousand (main channel); 367 thousand (combined)
- Views: 37.5 million (main channel); 52.6 million (combined)
- Website: www.collativelearning.com

Rob Ager (born 1973) is a British internet film critic and analyst. He has published in-depth analyses of a variety of films, including the horror genre and the works of Stanley Kubrick in particular. He has a YouTube channel, Collative Learning and a website of the same name.

== Early life ==
Ager is from Liverpool. Ager did not attend college. He worked on designing video game graphics before working for 15 years as a social worker.

== Film analysis ==
According to the New York Film Academy, Ager was one of the earliest internet movie critics and pioneered the video movie critique. He posted his first reviews in 2007. Ager has published popular analyses on films such as The Thing (1982), and various Stanley Kubrick films, including The Shining, A Clockwork Orange, Eyes Wide Shut, and 2001: A Space Odyssey. In a 2021 article, Esquire credited him with first developing the theory regarding suggestions of child sexual abuse in The Shining.

In a 2015 video series, Ager discussed possible vegan messages in The Texas Chain Saw Massacre. He has also reviewed puzzle game The Witness. He runs the website Collative Learning.
