= Frontera Sur =

Frontera Sur may refer to:

- Frontera Sur (1943 film), an Argentine film directed by Belisario García Villar
- Frontera Sur (1993 film), a Mexican film directed by Ernesto García Cabral and Hugo Stiglitz
- Frontera Sur (1998 film), an Argentine film directed by Gerardo Herrero
