= Kingsland, Texas =

- Census-designated place
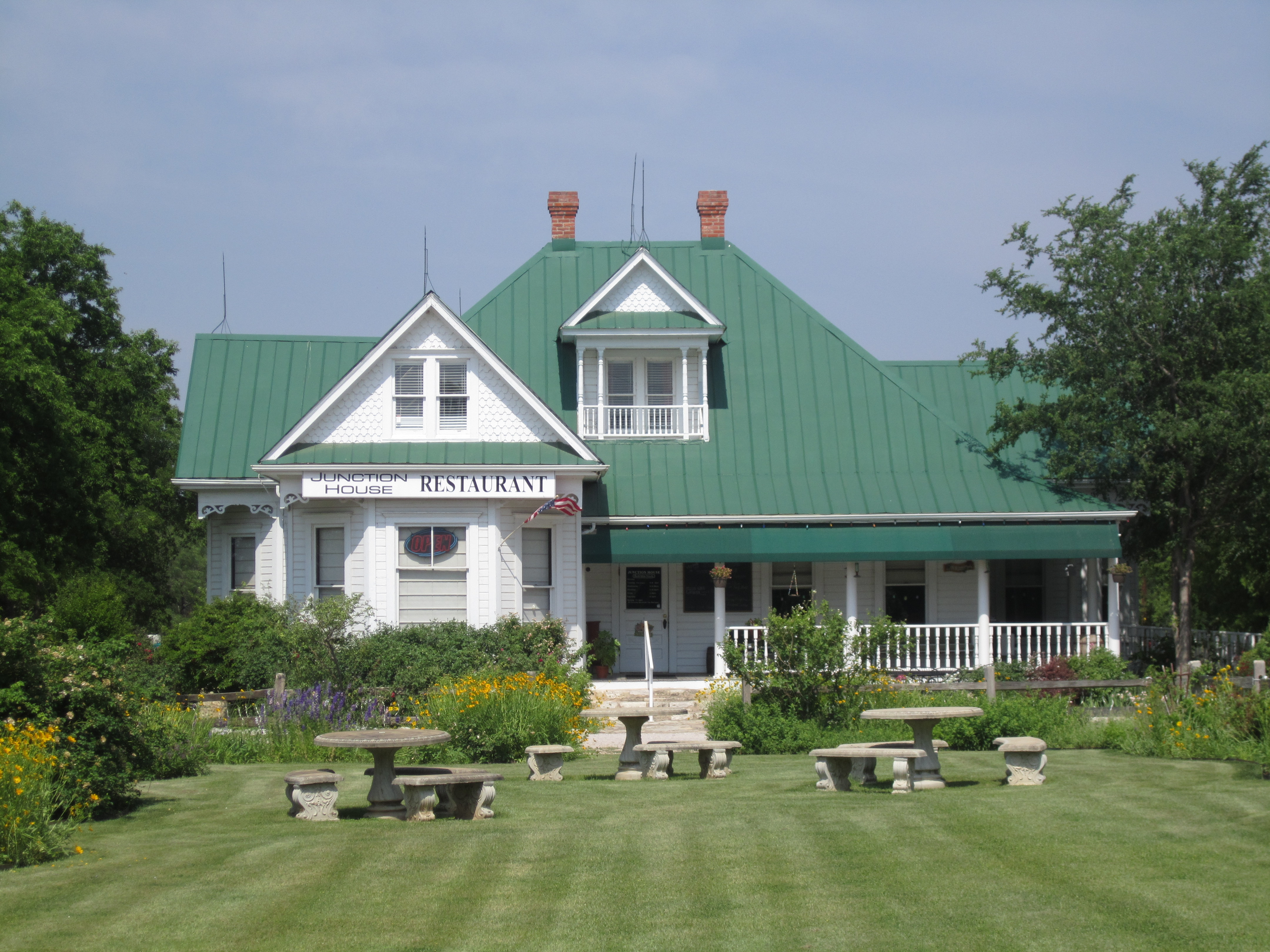
- Hooper's Cafe and Club Car Bar

- Location in Texas Location in the United States
- Coordinates: 30°39′54″N 98°27′16″W
- Country: United States
- State: Texas
- County: Llano

Area
  - Total: 9.83 sq mi (25.45 km^{2})
  - Land: 9.04 sq mi (23.42 km^{2})
  - Water: 0.78 sq mi (2.03 km^{2})
- Elevation: 863 ft (263 m)

Population (2020)
  - Total: 7,028
  - Density: 777.2/sq mi (300.1/km^{2})
- Time zone: UTC-6 (Central (CST))
  - Summer (DST): UTC-5 (CDT)
- ZIP code: 78639
- Area code: 325
- FIPS code: 48-39304
- GNIS feature ID: 2408486

Kingsland is a census-designated place (CDP) in Llano County, Texas, United States. As of the 2020 census, Kingsland had a population of 7,028. Texas Ranch to Market Road 1431 runs through the community.

== Geography ==
Kingsland is located in eastern Llano County at the confluence of the Colorado and the Llano rivers, which combine to form Lake Lyndon B. Johnson.

According to the United States Census Bureau, the CDP has a total area of 9.8 square miles (25.4 km^{2}), of which 9.0 square miles (23.4 km^{2}) are land and 0.8 square miles (2.0 km^{2}), or 7.96%, are water.

== Demographics ==
Historical population
Census	Pop.	Note	%±
1980	2,241		—
1990	2,725		21.6%
2000	4,584		68.2%
2010	6,030		31.5%
2020	7,028		16.6%
U.S. Decennial Census; 1850–1900 1910; 1920 1930 1940; 1950 1960 1970; 1980 1990 2000; 2010 2020

Kingsland was first listed as a census-designated place in the 1980 United States census.

=== 2020 census ===
Kingsland CDP, Texas – Racial and ethnic composition Note: the US Census treats Hispanic/Latino as an ethnic category. This table excludes Latinos from the racial categories and assigns them to a separate category. Hispanics/Latinos may be of any race.
Race / Ethnicity (NH = Non-Hispanic)	Pop 2000	Pop 2010	Pop 2020	% 2000	% 2010	% 2020
White alone (NH)	4,230	5,239	5,228	92.28%	86.88%	74.39%
Black or African American alone (NH)	6	61	62	0.13%	1.01%	0.88%
Native American or Alaska Native alone (NH)	12	20	37	0.26%	0.33%	0.53%
Asian alone (NH)	20	17	28	0.44%	0.28%	0.40%
Native Hawaiian or Pacific Islander alone (NH)	1	2	4	0.02%	0.03%	0.06%
Other race alone (NH)	4	1	13	0.09%	0.02%	0.18%
Mixed race or Multiracial (NH)	41	80	284	0.89%	1.33%	4.04%
Hispanic or Latino (any race)	270	610	1,372	5.89%	10.12%	19.52%
Total	4,584	6,030	7,028	100.00%	100.00%	100.00%

As of the 2020 United States census, there were 7,028 people, 2,854 households, and 1,656 families residing in the CDP.

=== 2000 census ===
As of the census of 2000, 4,584 people, 2,103 households, and 1,343 families resided in the CDP. The population density was 509.4 inhabitants per square mile (196.7/km^{2}). There were 2,803 housing units at an average density of 311.5 per square mile (120.3/km^{2}). The racial makeup of the CDP was 95.66% White, 0.13% African American, 0.31% Native American, 0.52% Asian, 0.02% Pacific Islander, 2.31% from other races, and 1.05% from two or more races. Hispanics or Latinos of any race were 5.89% of the population.

Of the 2,103 households, 18.2% had children under the age of 18 living with them, 55.3% were married couples living together, 6.0% had a female householder with no husband present, and 36.1% were not families. About 32.4% of all households were made up of individuals, and 20.8% had someone living alone who was 65 years of age or older. The average household size was 2.13 and the average family size was 2.64.

In the CDP, the population was distributed as 17.4% under the age of 18, 5.3% from 18 to 24, 19.6% from 25 to 44, 24.9% from 45 to 64, and 32.9% who were 65 years of age or older. The median age was 51 years. For every 100 females, there were 91.0 males. For every 100 females age 18 and over, there were 87.4 males.

The median income for a household in the CDP was $29,615, and for a family was $33,679. Males had a median income of $27,264 versus $19,255 for females. The per capita income for the CDP was $18,220. About 6.8% of families and 12.2% of the population were below the poverty line, including 21.5% of those under age 18 and 9.6% of those age 65 or over.

== Arts and culture ==
Among Kingsland's notable places is the 1901 Victorian-style Antlers Hotel, a railroad resort in Kingsland that fell into disrepair in the early 1900s, but was purchased and restored in the 1990s and reopened as the Antlers Hotel, with the Grand Central Cafe Restaurant in Queen Anne architecture and an historic railroad district. The house where The Texas Chain Saw Massacre was filmed (the Texas Chainsaw House) is located here and has been restored as a restaurant. It was moved here from Round Rock, Texas, from the site of what is now the La Frontera development in Williamson County in the 1998 by the owners of the hotel, and completely renovated to become an on-site restaurant.

Also a favorite location is "The Slab", where the road traverses the clear Llano River as it crosses over granite slabs and boulders. Both residents and tourists come to the slab to bask in the warm sun and swim or wade in the clear water running over the granite.

Librarian Suzette Baker was fired in 2021 after she refused to remove books about transgender teens, sex education, and race, including Between the World and Me by Ta-Nehisi Coates, from the Kingsland library shelves.

== Education ==
Kingsland is served by the Llano Independent School District, and is the location of Packsaddle Elementary School. Jr. High and High-school aged youth are bussed to Llano Jr. High and Llano High School, 18 miles away in Llano, TX.

== 2018 flooding ==
Kingsland experienced heavy rainfall catastrophic flooding following Hurricane Sergio in October 2018. The sea level of Llano River rose about 25 feet (7.6 m) in 12 hours, which flooded hundreds of homes and caused the RM2900 bridge to collapse.

== Gallery ==
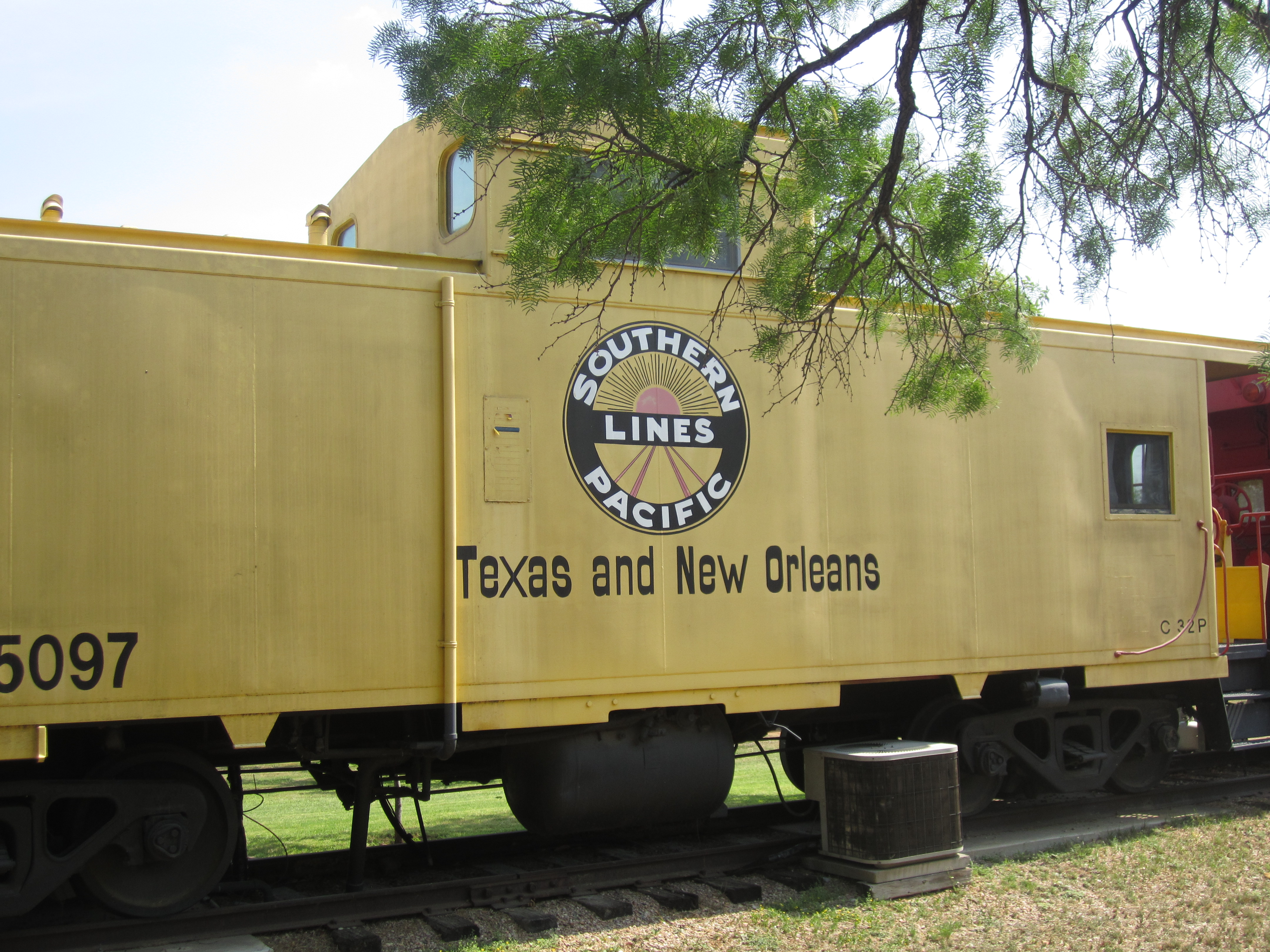
Southern Pacific Railroad

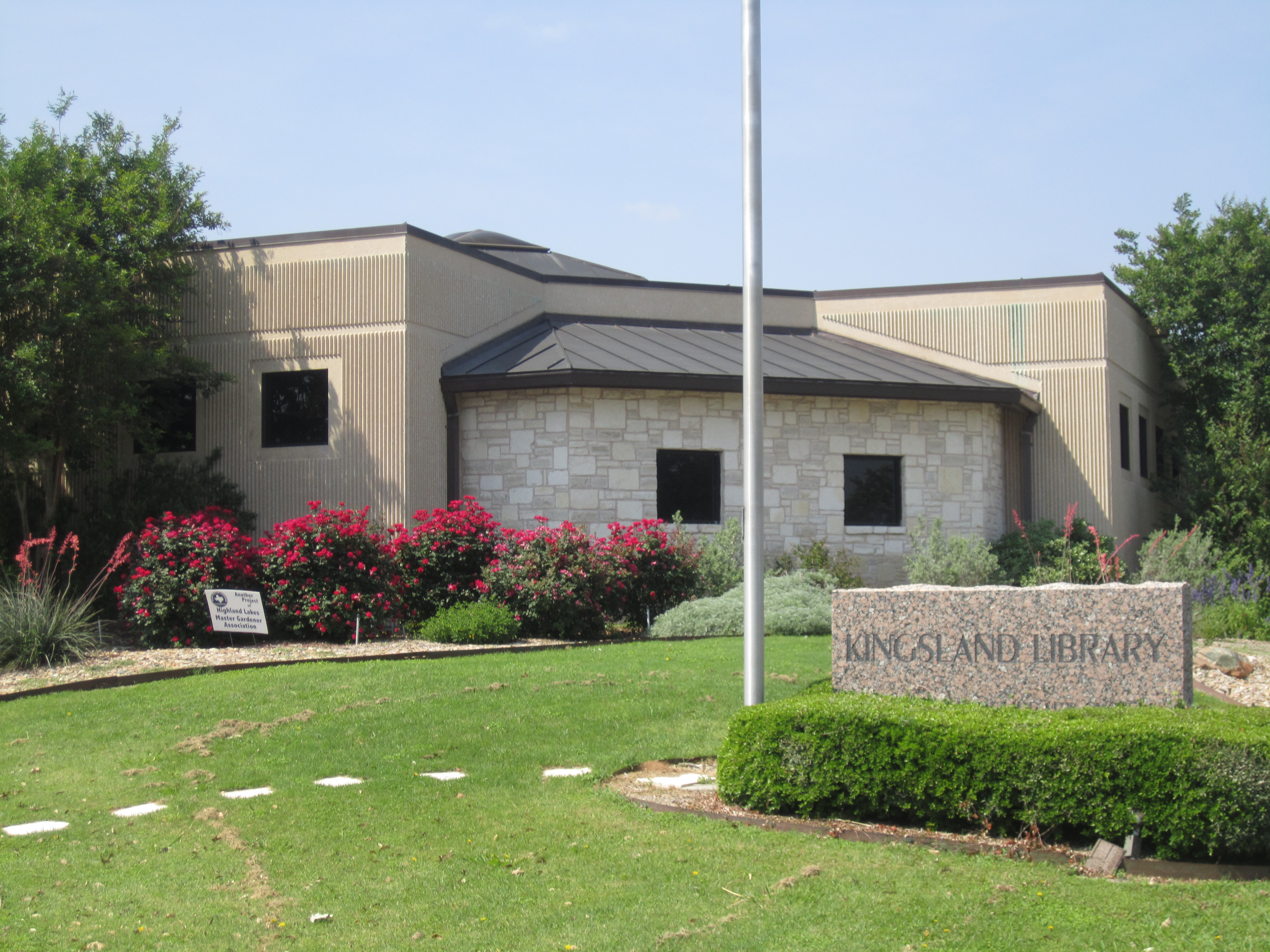
Kingsland Library

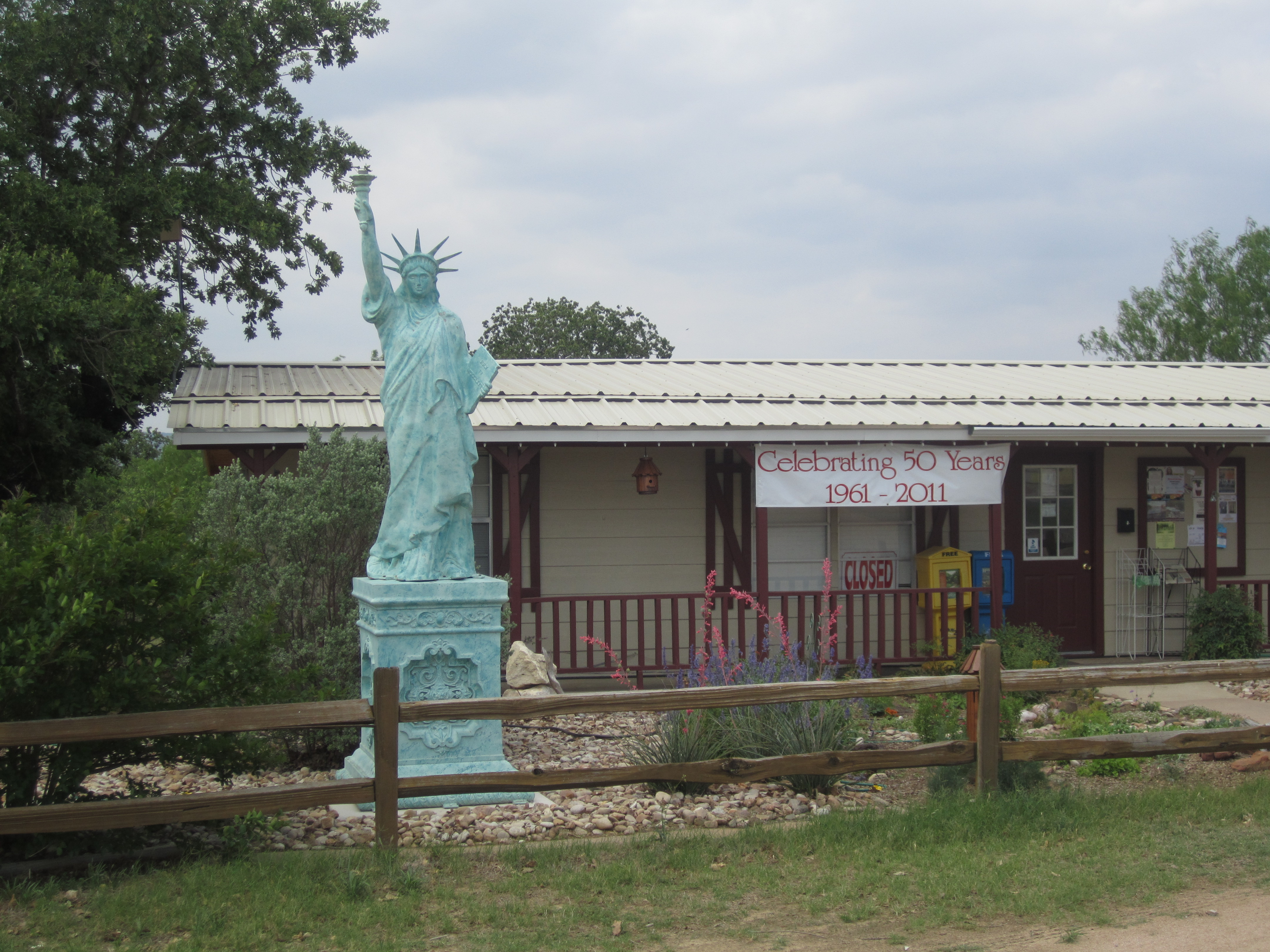
Tourist information office

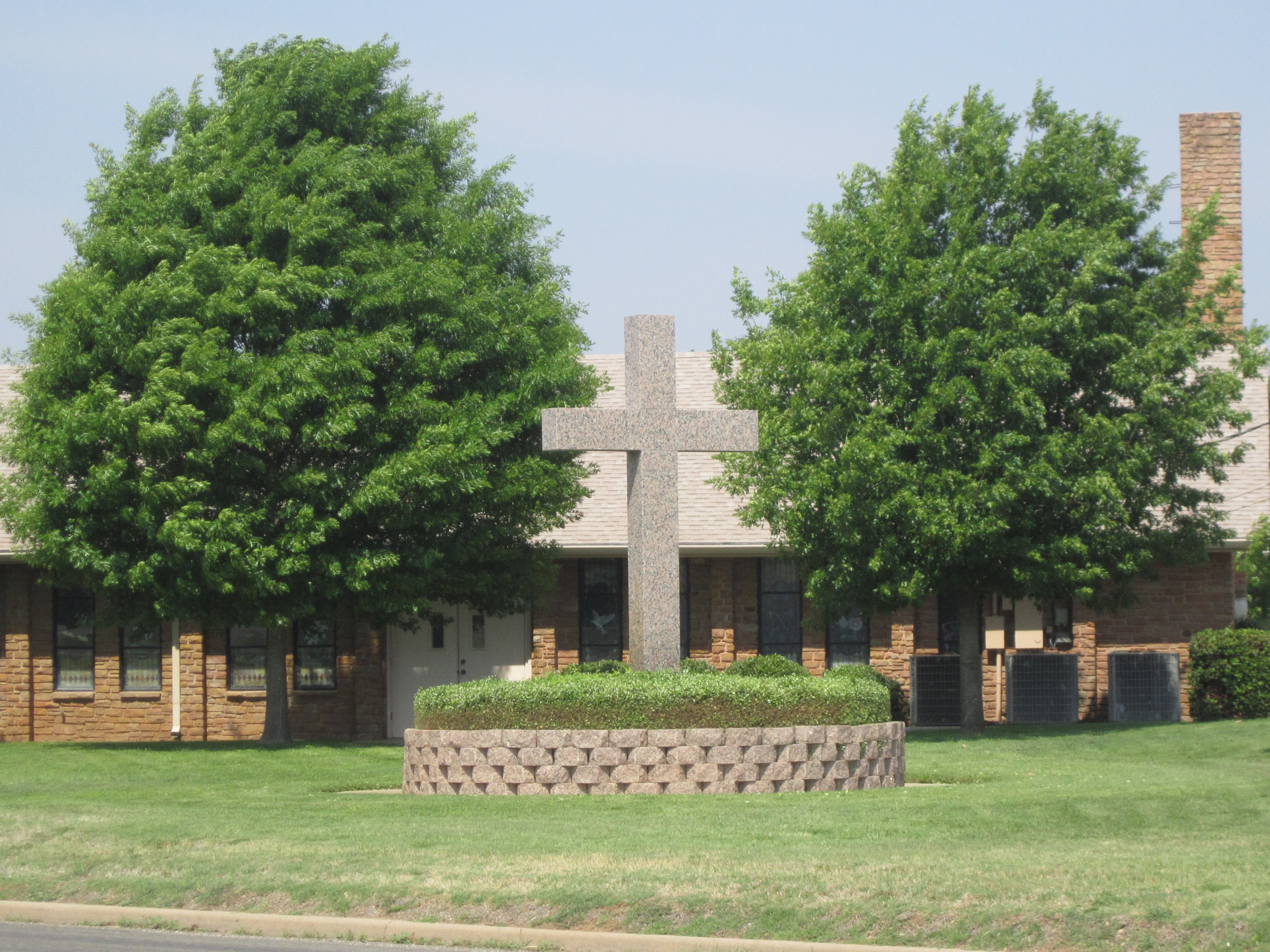
Kingsland Community Church

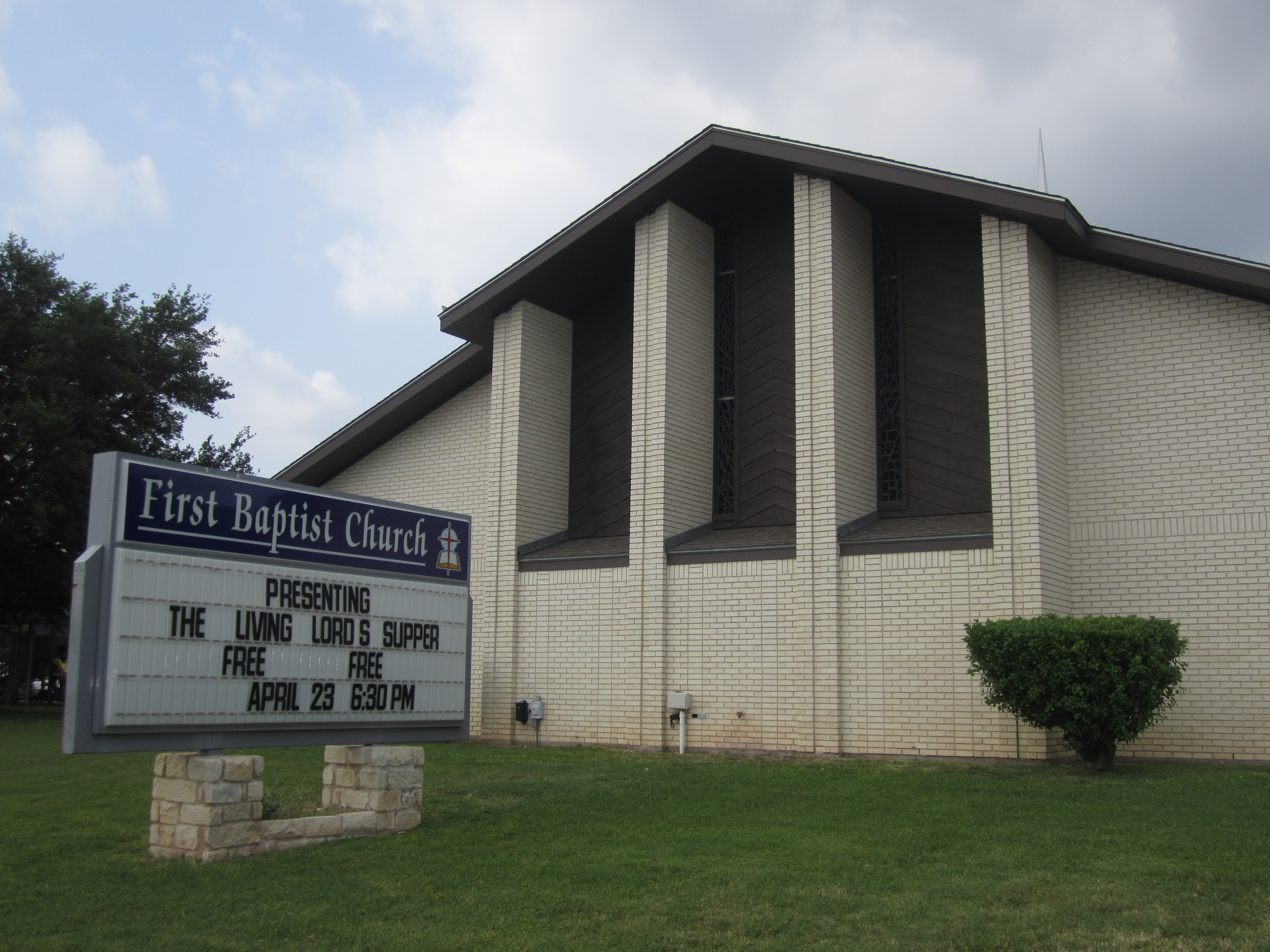
First Baptist Church

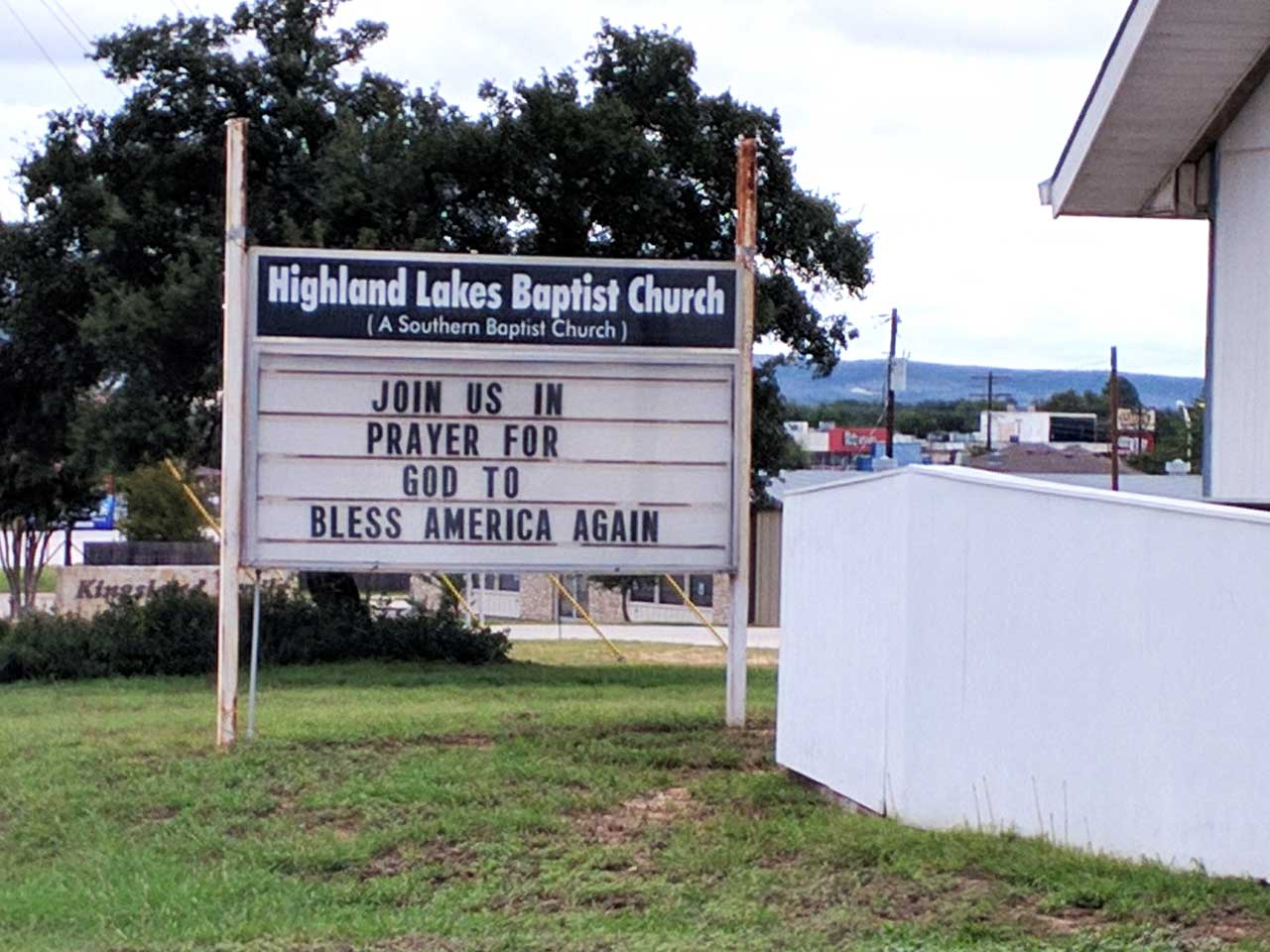
Highland Lakes Baptist Church

== See also ==
- Central Texas Electric Cooperative
