= The Texas Chain Saw Massacre =

1974 film by Tobe Hooper

- Theatrical release poster
- Directed by: Tobe Hooper
- Written by: Kim Henkel; Tobe Hooper
- Produced by: Tobe Hooper
- Starring: Marilyn Burns; Paul A. Partain; Edwin Neal; Jim Siedow; Gunnar Hansen
- Narrated by: John Larroquette
- Cinematography: Daniel Pearl
- Edited by: Sallye Richardson; Larry Carroll
- Music by: Tobe Hooper; Wayne Bell
- Production company: Vortex Inc.
- Distributed by: Bryanston Distributing Company
- Release date: October 11, 1974
- Running time: 83 minutes
- Country: United States
- Language: English
- Budget: $80,000–140,000
- Box office: $30.9 million

The Texas Chain Saw Massacre (Note: While the original theatrical release poster and many references to the film render its title as The Texas Chainsaw Massacre, the official spelling is The Texas Chain Saw Massacre, per the film's opening credits. This is also the title under which the film is registered with the U.S. Copyright Office.) is a 1974 American slasher film produced, co-composed, and directed by Tobe Hooper, who co-wrote it with Kim Henkel. The film stars Marilyn Burns, Paul A. Partain, Edwin Neal, Jim Siedow, and Gunnar Hansen. The plot follows a group of friends who fall victim to a family of cannibals while on their way to visit an old homestead. The independent film was marketed as being based on true events to attract a wider audience and to act as a subtle commentary on the era's political climate. Although the character of Leatherface and minor story details were inspired by the crimes of murderer Ed Gein, its plot is largely fictional.

Hooper produced the film for less than $140,000 ($700,000 adjusted for inflation) and used a cast of relatively unknown actors drawn mainly from central Texas, where the film was shot. Due to the film's violent content, Hooper struggled to find a distributor, but it was eventually acquired by the Bryanston Distributing Company. Hooper limited the quantity of onscreen gore in hopes of securing a PG rating, but the Motion Picture Association of America (MPAA) rated it R. The film faced similar difficulties internationally, being banned in several countries, and numerous theaters stopped showing the film in response to complaints about its violence.

The Texas Chain Saw Massacre was released in the United States on October 11, 1974. While the film initially received mixed reception from critics, it was highly profitable, grossing over $30 million at the domestic box office, equivalent with roughly over $205 million as of 2026, selling over 16.5 million tickets in 1974. It has since become widely regarded as one of the best and most influential horror films. It is credited with originating several elements common in the slasher genre: the use of power tools as murder weapons; the characterization of the killer as a large, hulking, masked figure; and the final girl. It led to a franchise that continued the story of Leatherface and his family through sequels, prequels, a remake, comic books, and video games. In 2024, the film was selected for preservation in the United States National Film Registry by the Library of Congress as being "culturally, historically, or aesthetically significant".

== Plot ==
In the early hours of August 18, 1973, a grave robber steals several corpses from a cemetery near the fictional town of Newt, Muerto County, Texas. The robber ties a rotting corpse and other body parts onto a monument, creating a grisly display that is discovered by a local resident as the sun rises.

Five teenagers — Sally Hardesty, Jerry, Pam, Kirk, and Sally's paraplegic brother Franklin — take a road trip through the area in a van. They stop at the cemetery to check on the grave of Sally and Franklin's grandfather, which appears undisturbed. As the group drives past a slaughterhouse, Franklin recounts the Hardesty family's history with animal slaughter. They soon pick up an eccentric hitchhiker, who mentions his family worked at the old slaughterhouse. The hitchhiker borrows Franklin's pocket knife and cuts himself, then takes a single Polaroid picture of the group, for which he demands money. When they refuse to pay, the hitchhiker sets the photo on fire and suddenly attacks Franklin with a straight razor. The group forces the hitchhiker out of the van, who smears his blood on the side as they drive off. Low on gasoline, the group stops at a gas station, but its proprietor says that he does not have any fuel. The group explores a nearby abandoned house, owned by the Hardesty family.

Kirk and Pam leave the others behind, planning to visit a nearby swimming hole mentioned by Franklin. On their way there, they discover another house, surrounded by run-down cars, and run by gas-powered generators. Hoping to barter with the residents for gasoline, Kirk enters the house through the unlocked front door, while Pam waits outside. As Kirk searches inside the house, a large man wearing a mask made of skin suddenly appears and murders him with a hammer. When Pam enters the house to search for Kirk, she stumbles into a room strewn with decaying remains and furniture made from human and animal bones. She attempts to flee but is caught by the man and impaled on a meat hook. The man then starts up a chainsaw, dismembering Kirk as Pam watches. In the evening, Jerry searches for Pam and Kirk. When he enters the other house, he finds Pam's nearly-dead, spasming body in a chest freezer and is killed by the masked man.

With darkness falling, Sally and Franklin set out to find their friends. En route, the masked man ambushes them, killing Franklin with the chainsaw. The man chases Sally into the house, where she finds a very old, seemingly dead man and a woman's rotting corpse. She escapes from the man by jumping through a second-floor window and flees to the gas station. With the man in pursuit, Sally arrives at the gas station when he seems to disappear. The station's proprietor comforts Sally with the offer of help, after which he beats and subdues her, loading her into his pickup truck. The proprietor drives to the other house, and the hitchhiker appears. The proprietor scolds him for his actions at the cemetery, identifying the hitchhiker as the grave robber. As they enter the house, the masked man reappears, dressed in women's clothing. The proprietor identifies the masked man and the hitchhiker as brothers, and the hitchhiker refers to the masked man as "Leatherface". The two brothers bring the old man—"Grandpa"—down the stairs and cut Sally's finger so that Grandpa can suck her blood; Sally faints from the ordeal.

The next morning, Sally regains consciousness. The men taunt her and bicker with each other, resolving to kill her with a hammer. They try to include Grandpa in the activity, but this repeatedly fails as he is too weak. Sally breaks free and runs onto a road in front of the house, pursued by the brothers. An oncoming truck accidentally runs over the hitchhiker, killing him. The truck driver attacks Leatherface with a large wrench, causing Leatherface to fall and injure his leg with the chainsaw. The truck driver flees, and Sally, covered in blood, flags down a passing pickup truck and climbs into the bed, narrowly escaping Leatherface. As the pickup drives away, Sally laughs hysterically while Leatherface swings his chainsaw in frustration as the sun rises.

== Cast ==
- Marilyn Burns as Sally Hardesty
- Allen Danziger as Jerry
- Paul A. Partain as Franklin Hardesty
- William Vail as Kirk
- Teri McMinn as Pam
- Edwin Neal as The Hitchhiker
- Jim Siedow as Drayton Sawyer
- Gunnar Hansen as Leatherface
- John Dugan as Grandpa Sawyer
- Robert Courtin as window washer
- William Creamer as bearded man
- John Henry Faulk as storyteller
- Jerry Green as cowboy
- Ed Guinn as cattle truck driver
- Joe Bill Hogan as drunk
- Perry Lorenz as pick up driver
- John Larroquette as narrator

== Production ==
=== Development ===
The concept for The Texas Chain Saw Massacre arose in the early 1970s while Tobe Hooper was working as an assistant film director at the University of Texas at Austin and as a documentary cameraman. He had already developed a story involving the elements of isolation, the woods, and darkness. He credited the graphic coverage of violence by San Antonio news outlets as one inspiration for the film and based elements of the plot on murderer Ed Gein, who committed his crimes in 1950s Wisconsin; Gein inspired other horror films such as Psycho (1960) and The Silence of the Lambs (1991). During development, several names for the film were considered, including Saturn in Retrograde, Head Cheese, Stalking Leatherface, and Leatherface.

I definitely studied Gein ... but I also noticed a murder case in Houston at the time, a serial murderer you probably remember named Elmer Wayne Henley. He was a young man who recruited victims for an older homosexual man. I saw some news report where Elmer Wayne ... said, "I did these crimes, and I'm gonna stand up and take it like a man." Well, that struck me as interesting, that he had this conventional morality at that point. He wanted it known that, now that he was caught, he would do the right thing. So this kind of moral schizophrenia is something I tried to build into the characters.

— Kim Henkel

Hooper has cited changes in the cultural and political landscape as central influences on the film. His intentional misinformation, that the "film you are about to see is true", was a response to being "lied to by the government about things that were going on all over the world". It reflected the skepticism against the Richard Nixon administration in the wake of the Watergate, the 1973 oil crisis, the 1973 economic recession, and "the massacres and atrocities in the Vietnam War". The "lack of sentimentality and the brutality of things" that Hooper noticed while watching the local news, whose graphic coverage was epitomized by "showing brains spilled all over the road", led to his belief that "man was the real monster here, just wearing a different face, so I put a literal mask on the monster in my film". The idea of using a chainsaw as the murder weapon came to Hooper while he was in the hardware section of a busy store, contemplating how to speed his way through the crowd.

Hooper and Kim Henkel cowrote the screenplay and formed Vortex, Inc. with Henkel as president and Hooper as vice president. They asked Bill Parsley, a friend of Hooper, to provide funding. Parsley formed a company named MAB, Inc. through which he invested $60,000 in the production. In return, MAB owned 50% of the film and its profits. Production manager Ron Bozman told most of the cast and crew that he would have to defer part of their salaries until after it was sold to a distributor. Vortex made the idea more attractive by awarding them a share of its potential profits, ranging from 0.25 to 6%, similar to mortgage points. The cast and crew were not informed that Vortex owned only 50%, which meant their points were worth half of the assumed value.

=== Casting ===
Many of the cast members at the time were relatively unknown actors—Texans who had played roles in commercials, television, and stage shows, as well as performers whom Hooper knew personally, such as Allen Danziger and Jim Siedow. Involvement in the film propelled some of them into the motion picture industry. The lead role of Sally was given to Marilyn Burns, who had appeared previously on stage and served on the film commission board at UT Austin while studying there. Teri McMinn was a student who worked with local theater companies, including the Dallas Theater Center. Henkel called McMinn to come in for a reading after he spotted her picture in the Austin American-Statesman. For her last call-back he requested that she wear short shorts, which proved to be the most comfortable of all the cast members' costumes.

Icelandic-American actor Gunnar Hansen was selected for the role of Leatherface. He regarded Leatherface as having an intellectual disability and having never learned to speak properly. To research his character in preparation for his role, Hansen visited a special needs school and watched how the students moved and spoke. John Larroquette performed the narration in the opening credits, for which he was paid in marijuana.

=== Filming ===
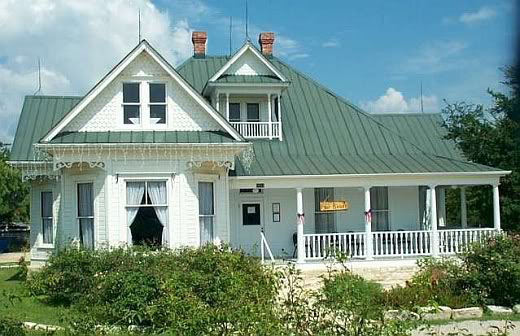
The farmhouse used for The Texas Chain Saw Massacre was moved from La Frontera to Kingsland, Texas, and restored as a restaurant.

The primary filming location was an early 1900s farmhouse located on Quick Hill Road near Round Rock, Texas, where the La Frontera development is now located. The crew filmed seven days a week, up to 16 hours a day. The environment was hot and the cast and crew found conditions tough; temperatures peaked at 110°F (43 °C) on July 26. Hansen later recalled, "It was 95, 100 degrees every day during filming. They wouldn't wash my costume because they were worried that the laundry might lose it, or that it would change color. They didn't have enough money for a second costume. So I wore that [mask] 12 to 16 hours a day, seven days a week, for a month."

The Texas Chain Saw Massacre was mainly shot using an Eclair NPR 16mm camera with fine-grain, low-speed Ektachrome Commercial film that required considerably more light than modern digital cameras and even most filmstocks of the day. This allowed more mobility and cost savings over shooting on the standard theatrical 35mm format of the time, without significant sacrifices to image quality. Most of the filming took place in the farmhouse, which was filled with furniture constructed from animal bones and a latex material used as upholstery to give the appearance of human skin. The house was not cooled, and there was little ventilation. The crew covered its walls with drops of animal blood obtained from a local slaughterhouse. Art director Robert A. Burns drove around the countryside and collected the remains of cattle and other animals in various stages of decomposition, with which he littered the floors of the house.

The special effects were simple and limited by the budget. The on-screen blood was real in some cases, such as the scene in which Leatherface feeds "Grandpa". The crew had difficulty getting the stage blood to come out of its tube, and Gunnar Hansen later admitted in his book Chain Saw Confidential that after several failed attempts, he secretly removed the protective tape from the knife and cut Burns' finger for real. Burns's costume was so drenched with stage blood that it was "virtually solid" by the last day of shooting. The scene in which Leatherface dismembers Kirk with a chainsaw worried actor William Vail (Kirk). After telling Vail to stay still lest he really be killed, Hansen brought the running chainsaw to within 3 inches (8 cm) of Vail's face. A real hammer was used for the climactic scene at the end, with some takes also featuring a mock-up. However, the actor playing Grandpa was aiming for the floor rather than his victim's head. Still, the shoot was quite dangerous, with Hooper noting at the wrap party that all cast members had obtained some level of injury. He stated that "everyone hated me by the end of the production" and that "it just took years for them to kind of cool off."

The gas station featured in several scenes of the film is located in Bastrop, Texas. It now operates as a horror-themed attraction, Texas barbecue restaurant, and motel. To maintain its resemblance to the film, the owners preserved various antiques, including the vintage sign that reads "We Slaughter Barbecue".

=== Post-production ===
The production exceeded its original $60,000 (about $304,000 adjusted for inflation) budget during editing. Sources differ on the film's final cost, offering figures between $93,000 (about $472,000 inflation-adjusted) and $300,000 (about $1,500,000 inflation-adjusted). A film production group, Pie in the Sky, partially led by future President of the Texas State Bar Joe K. Longley provided $23,532 (about $119,000 inflation-adjusted) in exchange for 19% of Vortex. This left Henkel, Hooper and the rest of the cast and crew with a 40.5% stake. Warren Skaaren, then head of the Texas Film Commission, helped secure the distribution deal with Bryanston Distributing Company. David Foster, who would later produce the 1982 horror film The Thing, arranged for a private screening for some of Bryanston's West Coast executives, and received 1.5% of Vortex's profits and a deferred fee of $500 (about $2,500 inflation-adjusted).

On August 28, 1974, Louis Peraino of Bryanston agreed to distribute the film worldwide, from which Bozman and Skaaren would receive $225,000 (about $1,100,000 inflation-adjusted) and 35% of the profits. Years later Bozman stated, "We made a deal with the devil, [sigh], and I guess that, in a way, we got what we deserved." They signed the contract with Bryanston and, after the investors recouped their money (with interest),—and after Skaaren, the lawyers, and the accountants were paid—only $8,100 (about $41,100 inflation-adjusted) was left to be divided among the 20 cast and crew members. Eventually the producers sued Bryanston for failing to pay them their full percentage of the box office profits. A court judgment instructed Bryanston to pay the filmmakers $500,000 (about $2,500,000 inflation-adjusted), but by then the company had declared bankruptcy. In 1983, New Line Cinema acquired the distribution rights from Bryanston and gave the producers a larger share of the profits.

== Release ==
The Texas Chain Saw Massacre premiered in Austin, Texas, on October 11, 1974, almost a year after filming concluded. It screened nationally in the United States as a Saturday afternoon matinée and its false marketing as a "true story" helped it attract a broad audience. For eight years after 1976, it was annually reissued to first-run theaters, promoted by full-page ads. The film eventually grossed more than $30 million in the United States and Canada ($14.4 million in rentals), making it the 12th-highest-grossing film initially released in 1974, despite its minuscule budget.

The film which you are about to see is an account of the tragedy which befell a group of five youths, in particular Sally Hardesty and her invalid brother, Franklin. [...]

— The opening crawl falsely suggests that the film is based on true events, a conceit that contributed to its success.

Hooper reportedly hoped that the Motion Picture Association of America (MPAA) would give the complete, uncut release print a "PG" rating due to its minimal amount of visible gore. Instead, it was originally rated "X". After several minutes were cut, it was resubmitted to the MPAA and received an "R" rating. A distributor restored the offending material, and at least one theater presented the full version under an "R". In San Francisco, cinema-goers walked out of theaters in disgust and in February 1976, two theaters in Ottawa, Canada, were advised by local police to withdraw the film lest they face morality charges.

After its initial British release, including a one-year theatrical run in London, The Texas Chain Saw Massacre was initially banned on the advice of British Board of Film Censors (BBFC) Secretary Stephen Murphy, and subsequently by his successor, James Ferman. While the British ban was in force the word "chainsaw" itself was barred from movie titles, forcing imitators to rename their films. In 1998, despite the BBFC ban, Camden London Borough Council granted the film a license. The following year the BBFC passed The Texas Chain Saw Massacre uncut for release with an 18 certificate, and it was broadcast a year later on Channel 4.

When the 83-minute version of the film was submitted to the Australian Classification Board by distributor Seven Keys in June 1975, the Board denied the film a classification, and similarly refused classification of a 77-minute print in December that year. In 1981, the 83-minute version submitted by Greater Union Film Distributors was again refused registration. It was later submitted by Filmways Australasian Distributors and approved for an "R" rating in 1984. It was banned for periods in many other countries, including Brazil, Chile, Finland, France, Iceland, Ireland, Norway, Singapore, Sweden and West Germany. In France, it was X-rated for "incitement to violence." In Sweden, it would also symbolize a video nasty, a discussed topic at the time.

The film was released in 2021 in Australia and 2024 in Russia, grossing $36,879 at the international box office. In 2025, a 4K remaster was released in Poland — the first time ever it was shown in movie theaters. It grossed $2.5 million in Blu-Ray home sales.

== Reception ==
The Texas Chain Saw Massacre received a mixed reaction upon its initial release. Linda Gross of the Los Angeles Times called it "despicable" and described Henkel and Hooper as more concerned with creating a realistic atmosphere than with its "plastic script". Roger Ebert of the Chicago Sun-Times said it was "as violent and gruesome and blood-soaked as the title promises", yet praised its acting and technical execution. Donald B. Berrigan of The Cincinnati Enquirer praised the lead performance of Burns: "Marilyn Burns, as Sally, deserves a special Academy Award for one of the most sustained and believable acting achievements in movie history." Patrick Taggart of the Austin American-Statesman hailed it as the most important horror film since George A. Romero's Night of the Living Dead (1968). Variety found the picture to be well-made, despite what it called the "heavy doses of gore". John McCarty of Cinefantastique stated that the house featured in the film made the Bates motel "look positively pleasant by comparison". Revisiting the film in his 1976 article "Fashions in Pornography" for Harper's Magazine, Stephen Koch found its sadistic violence to be extreme and unimaginative.

Horror and exploitation films almost always turn a profit if they're brought in at the right price. So they provide a good starting place for ambitious would-be filmmakers who can't get more conventional projects off the ground. The Texas Chainsaw Massacre belongs in a select company (with Night of the Living Dead and Last House on the Left) of films that are really a lot better than the genre requires. Not, however, that you'd necessarily enjoy seeing it.

— Roger Ebert, writing for the Chicago Sun-Times

Critics later frequently praised both the film's aesthetic quality and its power. Observing that it managed to be "horrifying without being a bloodbath (you'll see more gore in a Steven Seagal film)", Bruce Westbrook of the Houston Chronicle called it "a backwoods masterpiece of fear and loathing". TV Guide thought it was "intelligent" in its "bloodless depiction of violence", while Anton Bitel felt the fact that it was banned in the United Kingdom was a tribute to its artistry. He pointed out how the quiet sense of foreboding at the beginning of the film grows, until the viewer experiences "a punishing assault on the senses". In Hick Flicks: The Rise and Fall of Redneck Cinema, Scott Von Doviak commended its effective use of daylight shots, unusual among horror films, such as the sight of a corpse draped over a tombstone in the opening sequence. Mike Emery of The Austin Chronicle praised the film's "subtle touches"—such as radio broadcasts heard in the background describing grisly murders around Texas—and said that what made it so dreadful was that it never strayed too far from potential reality.

It has often been described as one of the scariest films of all time. Rex Reed called it the most terrifying film he had ever seen. Empire described it as "the most purely horrifying horror movie ever made" and called it "never less than totally committed to scaring you witless". Reminiscing about his first viewing of the film, horror director Wes Craven recalled wondering "what kind of Mansonite crazoid" could have created such a thing. It is a work of "cataclysmic terror", in the words of horror novelist Stephen King, who declared, "I would happily testify to its redeeming social merit in any court in the country." Critic Robin Wood found it one of the few horror films to possess "the authentic quality of nightmare". Quentin Tarantino called it "one of the few perfect movies ever made."

Based on 92 reviews published since 2000, the review aggregate website Rotten Tomatoes reports that 85% of critics gave it a positive review, with an average score of 8.20/10. The site's critical consensus states, "Thanks to a smart script and documentary-style camerawork, The Texas Chainsaw Massacre achieves start-to-finish suspense, making it a classic in low-budget exploitation cinema." On Metacritic, the film has a weighted average score of 92 out of 100 based on 18 critics, indicating "universal acclaim".

== Analysis ==
=== Contemporary American life ===
Hooper's apocalyptic landscape is ... a desert wasteland of dissolution where once vibrant myth is desiccated. The ideas and iconography of Cooper, Bret Harte and Francis Parkman are now transmogrified into yards of dying cattle, abandoned gasoline stations, defiled graveyards, crumbling mansions, and a ramshackle farmhouse of psychotic killers. The Texas Chainsaw Massacre [is] ... recognizable as a statement about the dead end of American experience.

— Christopher Sharrett

Critic Christopher Sharrett argues that since Alfred Hitchcock's Psycho (1960) and The Birds (1963), the American horror film has been defined by the questions it poses "about the fundamental validity of the American civilizing process", concerns amplified during the 1970s by the "delegitimation of authority in the wake of Vietnam and Watergate". "If Psycho began an exploration of a new sense of absurdity in contemporary life, of the collapse of causality and the diseased underbelly of American Gothic", he writes, The Texas Chain Saw Massacre "carries this exploration to a logical conclusion, addressing many of the issues of Hitchcock's film while refusing comforting closure".

Robin Wood characterizes Leatherface and his family as victims of industrial capitalism, their jobs as slaughterhouse workers having been rendered obsolete by technological advances. He states that the picture "brings to focus a spirit of negativity ... that seems to lie not far below the surface of the modern collective consciousness". Naomi Merritt explores the film's representation of "cannibalistic capitalism" in relation to Georges Bataille's theory of taboo and transgression. She elaborates on Wood's analysis, stating that the Sawyer family's values "reflect, or correspond to, established and interdependent American institutions ... but their embodiment of these social units is perverted and transgressive."

In Kim Newman's view, Hooper's presentation of the Sawyer family during the dinner scene parodies a typical American sitcom family: the gas station owner is the bread-winning father figure; the killer Leatherface is depicted as a bourgeois housewife; the hitchhiker acts as the rebellious teenager. Isabel Cristina Pinedo, author of Recreational Terror: Women and the Pleasures of Horror Film Viewing, states, "The horror genre must keep terror and comedy in tension if it is to successfully tread the thin line that separates it from terrorism and parody ... this delicate balance is struck in The Texas Chainsaw Massacre in which the decaying corpse of Grandpa not only incorporates horrific and humorous effects, but actually uses one to exacerbate the other."

=== Violence against women ===
The underlying themes of the film have been the subject of extensive critical discussion; critics and scholars have interpreted it as a paradigmatic exploitation film in which female protagonists are subjected to brutal, sadistic violence. Stephen Prince comments that the horror is "born of the torment of the young woman subjected to imprisonment and abuse amid decaying arms ... and mobiles made of human bones and teeth." As with many slasher films, it incorporates the "final girl" trope—the heroine and inevitable lone survivor who somehow escapes the horror that befalls the other characters: Sally Hardesty is wounded and tortured, yet manages to survive with the help of a male truck driver. Critics argue that even in exploitation films in which the ratio of male and female deaths is roughly equal, the images that linger will be of the violence committed against the female characters. The specific case of The Texas Chain Saw Massacre provides support for this argument: three men are killed in quick fashion, but one woman is brutally slaughtered—hung on a meathook—and the surviving woman endures physical and mental torture. In 1977, critic Mary Mackey described the meathook scene as probably the most brutal onscreen female death in any commercially distributed film. She placed it in a lineage of violent films that depict women as weak and incapable of protecting themselves.

In one study, a group of men were shown five films depicting differing levels of violence against women. On first viewing The Texas Chain Saw Massacre they experienced symptoms of depression and anxiety; however, upon subsequent viewing they found the violence against women less offensive and more enjoyable. Another study, investigating gender-specific perceptions of slasher films, involved 30 male and 30 female university students. One male participant described the screaming, especially Sally's, as the "most freaky thing" in the film.

According to Jesse Stommel of Bright Lights Film Journal, the lack of explicit violence in the film forces viewers to question their own fascination with violence that they play a central role in imagining. Nonetheless—citing its feverish camera moves, repeated bursts of light, and auditory pandemonium—Stommel asserts that it involves the audience primarily on a sensory rather than an intellectual level.

=== Vegetarianism ===
The Texas Chain Saw Massacre has been described as "the ultimate pro-vegetarian film" due to its animal rights themes. In a video essay, film critic Rob Ager describes the irony in humans being slaughtered for meat, putting humans in the position of being treated like farm animals. Hooper has confirmed that "it's a film about meat" and even gave up meat while making the film, saying, "In a way I thought the heart of the film was about meat; it's about the chain of life and killing sentient beings." Writer-director Guillermo del Toro became a vegetarian for a time after seeing the film.

== Legacy ==
=== Influence ===
The Texas Chain Saw Massacre is widely considered one of the greatest—and most controversial—horror films of all time and a major influence on the genre. In 1999, Richard Zoglin of Time commented that it had "set a new standard for slasher films". The Times listed it as one of the 50 most controversial films of all time. Tony Magistrale believes the film paved the way for horror to be used as a vehicle for social commentary. Describing it as "cheap, grubby and out of control", Mark Olsen of the Los Angeles Times declared that it "both defines and entirely supersedes the very notion of the exploitation picture". In his book Dark Romance: Sexuality in the Horror Film, David Hogan called it "the most affecting gore thriller of all and, in a broader view, among the most effective horror films ever made ... the driving force of The Texas Chainsaw Massacre is something far more horrible than aberrant sexuality: total insanity." According to Bill Nichols, it "achieves the force of authentic art, profoundly disturbing, intensely personal, yet at the same time far more than personal". Leonard Wolf praised the film as "an exquisite work of art" and compared it to a Greek tragedy, noting the lack of onscreen violence.

Leatherface has gained a reputation as a significant character in the horror genre. Christopher Null of Filmcritic.com said, "In our collective consciousness, Leatherface and his chainsaw have become as iconic as Freddy and his razors or Jason and his hockey mask." Don Sumner called The Texas Chain Saw Massacre a classic that not only introduced a new villain to the horror pantheon but also influenced an entire generation of filmmakers. According to Rebecca Ascher-Walsh of Entertainment Weekly, it laid the foundations for the Halloween, Evil Dead, and Blair Witch horror franchises. Wes Craven crafted his 1977 film The Hills Have Eyes as an homage to Massacre, while Ridley Scott cited Hooper's film as an inspiration for his 1979 film Alien. French director Alexandre Aja credited it as an early influence on his career. Horror filmmaker and heavy metal musician Rob Zombie sees it as a major influence on his work, including his films House of 1000 Corpses (2003) and The Devil's Rejects (2005). It also inspired the Ramones' 1976 song "Chain Saw."

The Texas Chain Saw Massacre was selected for the 1975 Cannes Film Festival Directors' Fortnight, BFI London Film Festival, and Locarno Film Festival. In 1976, it won the Special Jury Prize at the Avoriaz Fantastic Film Festival in France. Entertainment Weekly ranked the film sixth on its 2003 list of "The Top 50 Cult Films". In a 2005 Total Film poll, it was selected as the greatest horror film of all time. It was named among Time's top 25 horror films in 2007. In 2008 the film ranked number 199 on Empire magazine's list of "The 500 Greatest Movies of All Time". Empire also ranked it 46th in its list of the 50 greatest independent films. In a 2010 Total Film poll, it was again selected as the greatest horror film; the judging panel included veteran horror directors such as John Carpenter, Wes Craven, and George A. Romero. In 2010, as well, The Guardian ranked it number 14 on its list of the top 25 horror films. It was also voted the greatest horror film of all time in Slant Magazine's 2013 list of the greatest horror films of all time. It was also voted the scariest movie of all time in a 2017 list by Complex and voted the best horror movie of all time in a 2017 list by Thrillist. It was also voted the scariest movie of all time in a 2018 list by Consequence of Sound and voted the best horror movie of all time in a 2018 list by Esquire. In 2024, Variety selected it as the greatest horror movie of all time.

The Texas Chain Saw Massacre was inducted into the Horror Hall of Fame in 1990, with Hooper accepting the award, and it is part of the permanent collection of New York City's Museum of Modern Art. In 2012, the film was named by critics in the British Film Institute's Sight & Sound magazine as one of the 250 greatest films. The Academy Film Archive houses the Texas Chain Saw Massacre Collection, which contains over fifty items, including many original elements for the film.

=== Post-release ===
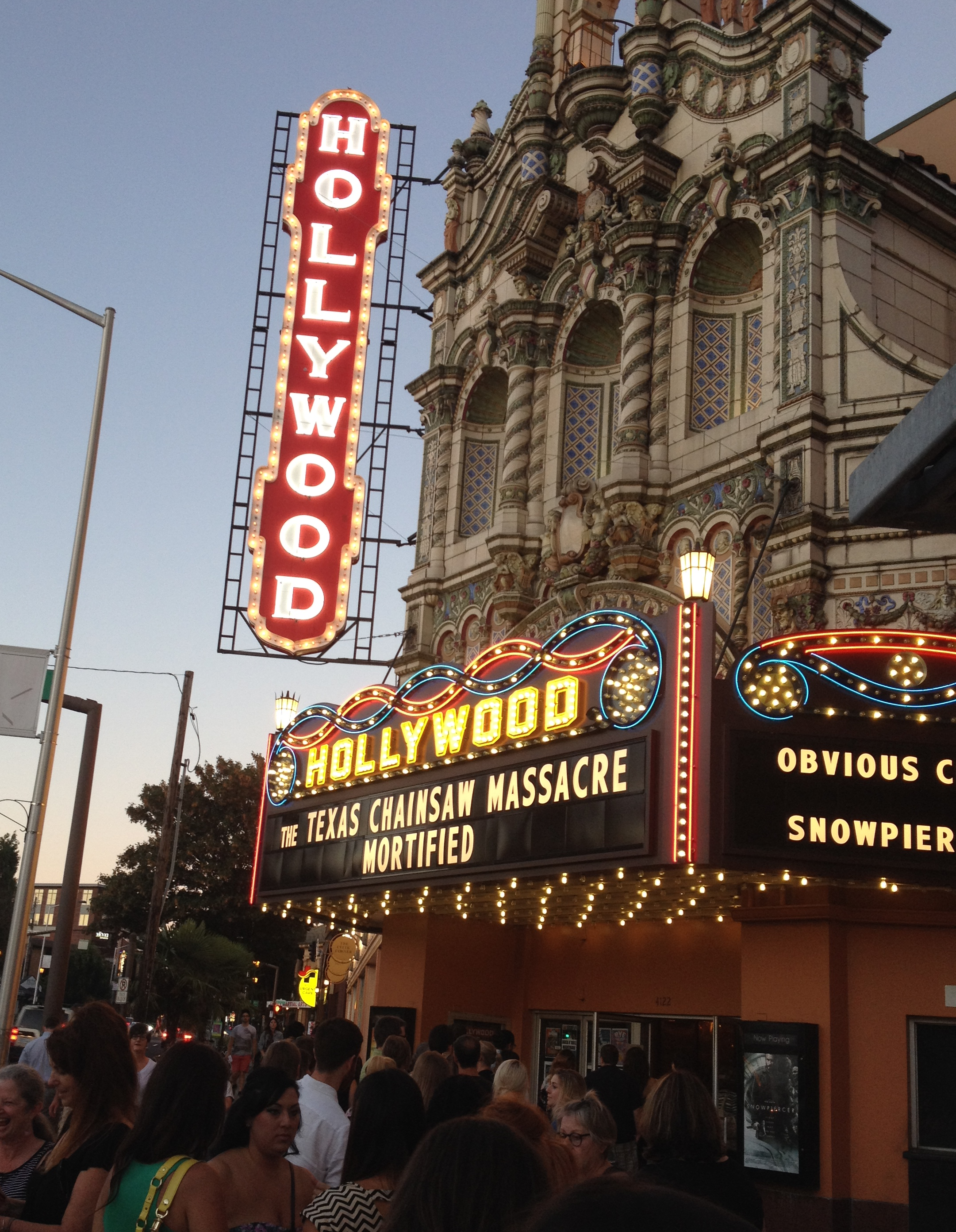
The Texas Chain Saw Massacre screening at the Hollywood Theatre in Portland, Oregon, in July 2014

The Texas Chain Saw Massacre has appeared on various home video formats. In the US, it was first released on videotape and CED in the early 1980s by Wizard Video and Vestron Video. The British Board of Film Classification had long since refused a certification for the uncut theatrical version and in 1984 they also refused to certify it for home video, amid a moral panic surrounding "video nasties". After the retirement of BBFC Director James Ferman in 1999, the board passed the film uncut for theatrical and video distribution with an 18 certificate, almost 25 years after the original release. The Texas Chain Saw Massacre was released on LaserDisc in the United States in November 1993. It was initially released on DVD in October 1998 in the United States, May 2000 in the United Kingdom and 2001 in Australia.

In 2005 the film received a 2K scan and full restoration from the original 16mm A/B rolls, which was subsequently released on DVD and Blu-ray. In 2014, a more extensive 4K restoration, supervised by Hooper, using the original 16mm A/B reversal rolls, was carried out. After a screening in the Directors' Fortnight section of the 2014 Cannes Film Festival, this was also released on DVD and Blu-ray worldwide. Dark Sky Films' US 40th Anniversary Edition was nominated for Best DVD/BD Special Edition Release at the 2015 Saturn Awards. In 2024, for the film's 50th anniversary, the film was released to Ultra HD Blu-ray and re-released to VHS in a collector's edition.

In 1982, shortly after The Texas Chain Saw Massacre established itself as a success on US home video, Wizard Video released a mass-market video game adaptation for the Atari 2600. In the game, the player assumes the role of Leatherface and attempts to murder trespassers while avoiding obstacles such as fences and cow skulls. As one of the first horror-themed video games, The Texas Chainsaw Massacre caused controversy when it was first released due to its violent nature; it sold poorly as a result, because many game stores refused to stock it.

The film has been followed by eight other films to date, including sequels, prequels and remakes. The first sequel, The Texas Chainsaw Massacre 2 (1986), was considerably more graphic and violent than the original and was banned in Australia for 20 years before it was released on DVD in a revised special edition in October 2006. Leatherface: The Texas Chainsaw Massacre III (1990) was the second sequel to appear, though Hooper did not return to direct due to scheduling conflicts with another film, Spontaneous Combustion. Texas Chainsaw Massacre: The Next Generation, starring Renée Zellweger and Matthew McConaughey, was released in 1995. While briefly acknowledging the events of the preceding two sequels, its plot makes it a virtual remake of the 1974 original. A straight remake, The Texas Chainsaw Massacre, was released by Platinum Dunes and New Line Cinema in 2003. It was followed by a prequel, The Texas Chainsaw Massacre: The Beginning, in 2006. A seventh film, Texas Chainsaw 3D, was released on January 4, 2013. It is a direct sequel to the original 1974 film, with no relation to the previous sequels, or the 2003 remake. Another prequel, Leatherface, was released exclusively to DirecTV on September 21, 2017, before receiving a wider release on video on demand and in limited theaters, simultaneously, in North America on October 20, 2017. Another sequel, Texas Chainsaw Massacre, was released exclusively on Netflix on February 18, 2022.

In 2023, both a tabletop game and a pinball machine based on the film were released. In 2025, a haunted house attraction called Universal Horror Unleashed features characters from the film.

== See also ==
- Cannibalism in popular culture
- List of American films of 1974
- List of cult films
- List of films voted the best
- List of films featuring psychopaths and sociopaths

== Sources ==
- Allon, Yoram; Patterson, Hannah (2002). Contemporary North American Film Directors: A Wallflower Critical Guide. Wallflower Press. ISBN 978-1-903364-52-9.
- Bloom, John (November 2004). "They Came. They Sawed". Texas Monthly. Vol. 32. Archived from the original on July 8, 2011.
- Bowen, John W. (November 2004). "Return of the Power Tool Killer". Rue Morgue. No. 42. Marrs Media. pp. 16–22. ISSN 1481-1103.
- Chibnall, Steve; Petley, Julian (2002). British Horror Cinema. Routledge. ISBN 978-0-415-23004-9.
- Clover, Carol J. (1993). Men, Women, and Chainsaws: Gender in the Modern Horror Film. Princeton University Press. ISBN 978-0-691-00620-8.
- Cook, David A. (2000). Lost Illusions: American Cinema in the Shadow of Watergate and Vietnam, 1970–1979. University of California Press. ISBN 978-0-520-23265-5.
- Freeland, Cynthia A. (2002). The Naked and the Undead: Evil and the Appeal of Horror. Westview Press. ISBN 978-0-8133-6563-3.
- Haines, Richard W. (2003). The Moviegoing Experience, 1968–2001. McFarland & Company. ISBN 978-0-7864-1361-4.
- Hansen, Gunnar (2013). Chain Saw Confidential: How We Made the World's Most Notorious Horror Movie. Chronicle Books. ISBN 978-1452114491.
- Jaworzyn, Stefan (2004). The Texas Chain Saw Massacre Companion. Titan Books. ISBN 978-1-84023-660-6.
- Macor, Alison (2010). Chainsaws, Slackers, and Spy Kids: Thirty Years of Filmmaking in Austin, Texas. University of Texas Press. ISBN 978-0-292-72243-9.
- Merritt, Naomi (2010). "Cannibalistic Capitalism and other American Delicacies: A Bataillean Taste of The Texas Chain Saw Massacre". Film-Philosophy. 14 (1): 202–231. doi:10.3366/film.2010.0007. ISSN 1466-4615.
- Muir, John Kenneth (2002). Eaten Alive at a Chainsaw Massacre: The Films of Tobe Hooper. McFarland & Company. ISBN 978-0-7864-1282-2.
- Rockoff, Adam (2002). Going to Pieces: The Rise and Fall of the Slasher Film, 1978–1986. McFarland & Company. ISBN 978-0-7864-1227-3.
- Sharrett, Christopher (2004). "The Idea of Apocalypse in The Texas Chain Saw Massacre". In Grant, Barry Keith; Sharrett, Christopher (eds.). Planks of Reason: Essays on the Horror Film. Scarecrow Press. ISBN 978-0-8108-5013-2.
- Worland, Rick (2006). The Horror Film: An Introduction. Blackwell. ISBN 978-1-4051-3902-1.
- Dika, Vera (2003). Recycled Culture in Contemporary Art and Film: The Uses of Nostalgia. United Kingdom: Cambridge University Press. ISBN 978-0-521-01631-5.
- Donaldson, Lucy Fife (2010). "Access and Excess in The Texas Chain Saw Massacre" (PDF). Movie: A Journal of Film Criticism (1).
- Greenberg, Harvey Roy (1994). Screen Memories: Hollywood Cinema on the Psychoanalytic Couch. Columbia University Press. ISBN 978-0-231-07287-8.
- Hand, Stephen (2004). The Texas Chainsaw Massacre. Games Workshop. ISBN 978-1-84416-060-0.
- Phillips, Kendall R. (2005). "The Exorcist (1973) and The Texas Chainsaw Massacre (1974)". Projected Fears: Horror Films and American Culture. Greenwood Publishing Group. ISBN 978-0-275-98353-6.
